= Person of Interest season 2 =

Season of television series

Person of Interest
- Season 2
- Home media cover art
- Starring: Jim Caviezel; Taraji P. Henson; Kevin Chapman; Michael Emerson
- No. of episodes: 22

Release
- Original network: CBS
- Original release: September 27, 2012 – May 9, 2013

Season chronology
- ← Previous; Season 1 Next → Season 3

The second season of the American television series Person of Interest premiered on September 27, 2012, on CBS and ended on May 9, 2013. The season is produced by Kilter Films, Bad Robot, and Warner Bros. Television, with Jonathan Nolan, Greg Plageman, J. J. Abrams, and Bryan Burk serving as executive producers and Plageman serving as showrunner.

The series was renewed for a second season in March 2012 and stars Jim Caviezel, Taraji P. Henson, Kevin Chapman and Michael Emerson. The series revolves around a mysterious reclusive billionaire computer programmer, Harold Finch, who has developed a computer program for the federal government known as "the Machine" that is capable of collating all sources of information to predict terrorist acts and to identify people planning them. The Machine also identifies perpetrators and victims of other premeditated deadly crimes; however, because the government considers these "irrelevant", Finch programs the Machine to delete this information each night and programs the Machine to notify him secretly of the "irrelevant" numbers. Finch recruits John Reese, a former Green Beret and CIA agent, now presumed dead – to investigate the people identified by the numbers the Machine has provided, and to act accordingly.

Viewership for the season increased from the first season, with an average of 16.07 million viewers, ranking as the 5th most watched series of the 2012–13 television season. The season received positive reviews from critics, with many deeming it an improvement over the previous season, praising its performances, writing and subject matter. In March 2013, CBS renewed the series for a third season.

== Season summary ==
The season starts with Reese rescuing Finch after he is kidnapped by Root. During the second season, Decima Technologies, a powerful, and secretive international private intelligence agency, run by ex-MI6 spy and idealist John Greer, is revealed to be attempting to gain access to the Machine. Carter vows vengeance against HR after they have her boyfriend, Detective Cal Beecher, murdered. Reese and Finch encounter Sameen Shaw, a U.S. Army ISA assassin, on the run after being betrayed by her employers. Shaw learns about the Machine in the season two finale and subsequently becomes a member of Reese and Finch's team. The Machine is revealed to have developed sentience and covertly arranged for itself to be moved to an undisclosed location to protect itself from interference.

== Cast and characters ==
=== Main ===
- Jim Caviezel as John Reese
- Taraji P. Henson as Detective Jocelyn "Joss" Carter
- Kevin Chapman as Detective Lionel Fusco
- Michael Emerson as Harold Finch

=== Recurring ===
- Jay O. Sanders as Special Counsel
- Boris McGiver as Hersh
- Amy Acker as Samantha Groves/Root
- Robert John Burke as Officer Patrick Simmons
- Clarke Peters as Alonzo Quinn
- Sterling K. Brown as Detective Calvin "Cal" Beecher
- Brett Cullen as Nathan Ingram
- Brennan Brown as FBI Agent Nicholas Donnelly
- Al Sapienza as Detective Raymond Terney
- Enrico Colantoni as Carl Elias
- Ken Leung as Leon Tao
- Carrie Preston as Grace Hendricks
- Sarah Shahi as Sameen Shaw
- Brendan Griffin as Charles Macavoy
- Brian Hutchison as FBI Agent Brian Moss
- Creighton James as Wayne Packer
- Michael Kelly as CIA Agent Mark Snow
- James Knight as Brian Kelly
- John Nolan as John Greer
- Annie Parisse as CIA Agent Kara Stanton
- Paige Turco as Zoe Morgan
- Michael McGlone as Detective Bill Szymanski
- Cotter Smith as Denton Weeks
- Morgan Spector as Peter Yogorov
- David Valcin as Anthony S. Marconi/Scarface

=== Notable guests ===
- Margo Martindale as Barbara Russell ("Bad Code")
- Jonathan Tucker as Riley Cavanaugh ("Triggerman")
- Gloria Votsis as Maxine Angelis ("Bury the Lede")
- John Ventimiglia as Christopher Zambrano ("Bury the Lede")
- Alicia Witt as Connie Wyler ("The High Road")
- David Denman as Graham Wyler ("The High Road")
- Sharon Leal as Dr. Madeleine Enright ("Critical")
- Julian Sands as Alistair Wesley ("Critical")
- Mark Pellegrino as Daniel Drake ("Til Death")
- Francie Swift as Sabrina Drake ("Til Death")
- Michael Irby as Fermin Ordoñez ("C.O.D.")
- Reiko Aylesworth as Regina Vickers ("C.O.D.")
- Brian J. Smith as Shayn Coleman ("Shadow Box")
- Luke Kirby as Chris Beckner ("2πR")
- Luke Kleintank as Caleb Phipps ("2πR")
- Jimmi Simpson as Logan Pierce ("One Percent")
- Paul Sparks as Wilson ("Relevance")
- Ebon Moss-Bachrach as Michael Cole ("Relevance")
- Luke Macfarlane as Alan Fahey ("Proteus")
- Becky Ann Baker as Erica Schmidt ("Proteus")
- Dan Lauria as Stanley Amis ("Proteus")
- Michael Rispoli as Darien Makris ("All In")
- Dennis Boutsikaris as Dr. Richard Nelson ("In Extremis")
- James Hanlon as Jimmy Stills ("In Extremis")

== Episodes ==
No. overall	No. in season	Title	Directed by	Written by	Original release date	Prod. code	U.S. viewers (millions)
24	1	"The Contingency"	Richard J. Lewis	Denise Thé & Jonathan Nolan	September 27, 2012	2J7201	14.28
The Machine provides Reese a code that translates to the SSN of accountant Leon Tao, who is being targeted for stealing money from the Aryan Brotherhood. Reese saves Tao from the gang and adopts their dog, which he names Bear. The government sabotages Carter's investigation into Corwin's death to prevent her from learning about the Machine. Root takes Finch to a cabin in Maryland and kidnaps NSA operative Denton Weeks. She explains that she sees the Machine as a "perfect intelligence" and wants to "set it free." Reese threatens to quit his operations unless the Machine helps him find Finch, and receives the SSN of a girl in Texas who has been missing since 1991 when she was 14. Flashbacks to the early days of the Machine's development depict it saving Finch from a distracted driver who dies in a crash. Finch rebukes the Machine and states that it should be protecting everyone, not only him.
25	2	"Bad Code"	Jon Cassar	Greg Plageman & Patrick Harbinson	October 4, 2012	2J7202	14.58
Root interrogates Denton Weeks for the Machine's location and kills him after he discloses it. Reese identifies the missing girl provided to him by the Machine as Hanna Frey, who was abducted and never found twenty years prior. Reese suspects the missing Hanna to be Root, especially as her abductor was set up to be murdered in a manner matching Root's MO. Reese and Carter's investigation leads them to Hanna's friend Samantha Groves, the sole witness to the abduction. Sam informed the local librarian of what she saw, only for the librarian -- the perpetrator's wife -- to accuse Sam of lying and intimidate her into silence about the abductor's identity. Sam later adopted the alias "Root" and left home after the death of her mother. With the help of the remorseful librarian, Carter finds Hanna's body and ensures that she gets a proper burial. While investigating Corwin's murder, Fusco finds a taped conversation regarding the government's search for Weeks, which, combined with a clue found in Hanna's killer's house, allows Reese to locate the cabin and retrieve Finch. Root escapes but calls Reese to thank him for finding her friend, but warns that she will come back for Finch.
26	3	"Masquerade"	Jeffrey Hunt	Melissa Scrivner Love	October 18, 2012	2J7203	13.93
As Finch tries to readjust to life after his kidnapping, establishing a bond with Reese's attack dog Bear, Reese poses as a bodyguard to get close to Sophia Campos, the spoiled daughter of the Brazilian consul in New York. Sophia has become the target of the leader of a drug smuggling operation, who believes that she and a friend witnessed their operations. Reese saves her from the gang. Meanwhile, Fusco hands the Alicia Corwin case on to Carter. While at the morgue, Carter encounters Mark Snow, who claims that he has been reassigned, but is in fact being held hostage by Kara Stanton.
27	4	"Triggerman"	James Whitmore, Jr.	Erik Mountain	October 25, 2012	2J7204	14.03
Riley Cavanaugh, an enforcer for an Irish mobster, becomes the next number when he betrays his boss and goes on the run with his lover, Annie, whom he was ordered to kill. Reese and Finch debate the morality of trying to save a ruthless killer, but they soon need Riley's help when Annie is captured by bounty hunters hired by the mob. To keep Annie safe, Finch is forced to make a deal with Elias, who continues to run his criminal organization from behind bars, in exchange for a game of chess. Elias uses his influence to order the hit called off, but the mobster continues to personally pursue the couple. Riley sacrifices his life in order to save Annie, an act Reese encourages her to interpret as proof of his love and a sign of his redemption. Reese later tracks down the hitman who killed Riley and presumably kills him in retaliation.
28	5	"Bury the Lede"	Jeffrey Hunt	David Slack	November 1, 2012	2J7205	13.66
In the midst of New York's mayoral elections, the FBI are closing the net around the HR; 75 dirty cops are arrested, but their elusive leader remains unknown. Investigative reporter Maxine Angelis is trying to beat them to the story and becomes the next number, but Reese finds it difficult to openly protect Maxine when Finch discovers she is also researching an exposé on the mysterious "man in the suit". HR runs a gambit to trick Maxine into imprudently naming an FBI informant as HR's leader, causing HR's criminal enemies to murder the innocent man and discrediting all her work, including an exposé of a mayoral candidate. Finch uses an online dating website to get Reese close to Maxine without exposing his true identity. While Reese helps Maxine hunt for the dead informant's ledger containing the names of everyone in HR, he must also protect her from repeated HR kill teams. Reese, Carter and Fusco track down the ledger, and Fusco secretly removes the pages that would incriminate himself and Simmons. The ledger names one of the mayoral candidates as the big boss, causing his opponent to win the race, but in reality, both candidates are on the payroll of Alonzo Quinn, HR's true leader.
29	6	"The High Road"	Félix Alcalá	Nic Van Zeebroeck & Michael Sopczynski	November 8, 2012	2J7206	14.87
Reese ventures into suburbia to locate the next person of interest, Graham Wyler, whose past returns to haunt him. Reese "proposes" to Zoe Morgan for the mission to help blend into suburban life. They move to the suburbs to investigate Wyler. Wyler is forced to help with a robbery led by his former partners, as he is a master safecracker. He cracks the safe as Reese and the NYPD show up. Carter buys some extra time with the police by leading them up the wrong staircase to give Reese and Wyler time to escape down the other, but Wyler decides he does not want to continue running from his past and turns himself in. He turns state's evidence against the gang and is then placed on house arrest, as the court deems him no threat to society due to his help in getting convictions on his crew. Flashbacks show Finch greeting Grace (his future fiancé) for the first time.
30	7	"Critical"	Frederick E. O. Toye	Sean Hennen	November 15, 2012	2J7207	14.57
Reese and Finch work to save both the life of a CEO undergoing secret surgery and the wife of the surgeon from a former MI6 agent and a team of ex-SAS operatives. Leon Tao, once again in danger, assists while under protective detention. Carter handles the case of a murdered man with her business card in his pocket, discovering that Agent Snow is the murderer. Snow reveals to her that he has been strapped to a bomb suit and says that 'she', referring to Stanton, is planning something big. Detective Carter informs Reese of her meeting with Agent Snow, and he warns her to stay out of the case.
31	8	"'Til Death"	Helen Shaver	Amanda Segel	November 29, 2012	2J7208	14.43
The Machine produces two numbers belonging to a married couple who own a publishing house. Reese and Finch work together and soon discover that each has ordered a hit on the other to settle a proposed sellout deal for their company. Reese kidnaps the couple with Carter's reluctant help, and defends them from a group of armed thugs while Finch plays marriage counselor. Eventually the hitmen are taken down while the couple are arrested but work out their marital problems. Finch suggests that the two will not spend much time in jail due to skilled lawyers, as well as their refusal to testify against each other. Meanwhile, Carter begins a relationship with narcotics detective Cal Beecher.
32	9	"C.O.D."	Clark Johnson	Ray Utarnachitt	December 6, 2012	2J7209	14.18
Reese works to save the life of a local taxi driver who is put in danger when a passenger leaves behind a laptop that is wanted by the Estonian mafia. Reese and Finch eventually realize the laptop contains valuable information that could enable terrorists to enter the country undetected. As a result, the Estonian mafia is killing anyone who has even seen the laptop. Finch is able to locate the laptop and the Estonians are defeated by Reese. Finch and Reese then have the cab driver use the laptop to negotiate a deal with the Secret Service to bring his family over from Cuba in exchange for the laptop. At the same time, HR decides to reestablish ties with Elias and blackmail Fusco into helping. After walking into an ambush, Fusco tells HR member Simmons that Elias has cut all ties, and Fusco does the same. Unwilling to accept Fusco bowing out, Simmons leaves Carter with an anonymous tip that a cop murdered Detective Ian Davidson ("Blue Code").
33	10	"Shadow Box"	Stephen Surjik	Patrick Harbinson	December 13, 2012	2J7210	14.08
Reese must protect the sister of a soldier who died in Afghanistan and her boyfriend, an ex-Marine who lost his right arm. The two are trying to expose an executive stealing from a charity for wounded veterans. Carter is offered a temporary assignment to the FBI when Special Agent Donnelly returns with new clues he believes will lead to Reese. The situation gets complicated when Reese, for whom the wounded veterans charity case has become personal, puts himself at risk as the FBI closes in on him while Finch is unable to stop him. The FBI ultimately arrests Reese and three mercenaries under suspicion of being "the Man in the Suit," but the financial information recovered from a safe deposit box will allow Finch to redistribute the stolen money to reputable military charities; Finch promises to help the couple to escape to safety. Fusco, meanwhile, grows increasingly suspicious of Carter's boyfriend Cal Beecher, who is revealed to be the godson of HR leader Alonzo Quinn.
34	11	"2πR"	Richard J. Lewis	Dan Dietz	January 3, 2013	2J7211	16.23
With Reese in FBI custody, Finch poses as a high school teacher to protect the next number, a teenager named Caleb Phipps who is deliberately underperforming at school to hide his intelligence. Finch discovers that Caleb is a master coder and, with Fusco's help, learns the boy is also a drug lord. Finch accuses Caleb's tech teacher of stealing Caleb's code, but the truth is that the teacher is trying to promote Caleb's work so investors can help Caleb profit from it. Finch learns Caleb plans to give his valuable code and drug money to his drunk mother and commit suicide at the train station where his brother was killed in a train accident. Finch is able to talk Caleb out of it. The next day, Caleb thanks Finch as he prepares for school, as Finch hints about his own past as a legendary hacker. Meanwhile, Reese and three other men are held captive by the FBI, who prepare to interrogate each one until they reveal the identity of the "Man in the Suit". In order to help prevent this, Carter removes Reese's fingerprints from the system and tampers with the DNA evidence.
35	12	"Prisoner's Dilemma"	Chris Fisher	David Slack	January 10, 2013	2J7212	15.67
Fusco is assigned to the new number, supermodel Karolina Kurkova. Meanwhile, Carter is asked to interrogate the four suspects in jail. Elias offers to help Reese, but Reese refuses, to avoid the attention of the FBI. Finch bribes a suspect to blame one of the other men, but after another suspect is killed by a government assassin named Hersh, Agent Donnelly suspects the real man is Reese. Donnelly incites a brawl involving Reese to get him to reveal himself, but Elias breaks it up, saving Reese and preserving his identity. Carter questions the last suspect to provoke him, falsely identifying him as the man in the suit and securing Reese's release. Later, Reese visits Carter and thanks her, but Donnelly arrests Carter for conspiracy and Reese for murder, having deduced the truth from Carter's defense of Reese. The Machine informs Finch the next number is Donnelly and he tries to warn him as a truck hits Donnelly's car. Kara Stanton walks out, killing Donnelly and sedating Reese.
36	13	"Dead Reckoning"	John Dahl	Erik Mountain	January 31, 2013	2J7213	15.71
Carter survives the crash while Reese is taken by Kara Stanton. Reese, with a bomb strapped to his vest like Mark Snow, is forced into doing fieldwork alongside him. The two steal a hard drive and are assigned to install it. A flashback shows Stanton was visited in the hospital by a man named Greer after surviving the Ordos airstrike. Stanton agrees to help Greer if he reveals who tried to kill her in China. Back in the present, Stanton activates the bomb vests and activates the cyberweapon stored on the hard drive; Reese and Snow escape, but Snow attacks Reese and runs off to get Stanton. Carter and Fusco try to help Reese, but he refuses. Finch meets Reese and deactivates the bomb vest. Having completed her mission, Stanton is met by Greer, who gives her the name of the person who sold the laptop. Snow shows up in her car and his vest explodes, killing Snow and seemingly Stanton as well. The FBI later names Snow "The Man in the Suit" and closes the case. A flashback before the car explosion shows the name Stanton received: Harold Finch.
37	14	"One Percent"	Chris Fisher	Denise Thé & Melissa Scrivner Love	February 7, 2013	2J7214	14.88
Reese protects eccentric Internet billionaire Logan Pierce (Jimmi Simpson), who is dragging the reputation of his company FriendCzar through the mud with his bad behavior. After several attempts on Pierce's life, it is revealed that his partner, Justin Ogilvay, has been trying to kill him. Pierce flies himself and Reese to St. Petersburg, Russia, to escape the killer, but he invites several friends to join him and party, causing Reese to walk away. Pierce runs into Justin and his goons outside who are just about to throw him off a bridge when Reese appears and saves him. Justin is arrested, and it is revealed that Pierce was in cahoots with Emily Morton, who has developed a superior technology. By being removed from FriendCzar, Pierce's non-compete agreement is void, allowing him to assist Emily in a new venture which will crush FriendCzar. When Reese shows Finch the $2 million watch that Pierce gave him, Finch stomps on it, revealing a tiny GPS tracker inside. Pierce was trying to track them and learn who they are. In a flashback to 2009, Finch's old partner Ingram is shown about to try to save one of the "irrelevant" numbers identified by the Machine.
38	15	"Booked Solid"	Frederick E. O. Toye	Nic Van Zeebroeck & Michael Sopczynski	February 14, 2013	2J7215	14.87
Reese and Finch work undercover in a hotel to protect a maid named Mira (Mia Maestro) who escaped the war in Kosovo. Mira, who is hiding her true identity, is being followed by a hit squad. She refuses to cooperate with a reporter investigating a Serbian general's war crimes. When the reporter is murdered, she decides to give a DVD with evidence to the authorities. Fusco escorts Mira to the station, where one final hit man attempts to kill her; he is shot by Carter. Meanwhile, Carter is invited to join the FBI. She passes the polygraph but is rejected because Cal Beecher, her friend and love interest, has a record of Internal Affairs investigations. Acting on orders from the Special Counsel, Hersh follows Reese to the hotel, intending to interrogate and kill him. Reese stabs Hersh, and gives him a choice: Seek medical attention or attack Reese. Hersh chooses the hospital. While in recovery, he is ordered back to D.C. Finch purchases the hotel and promotes Mira to manager. Meanwhile, the Special Counsel's assistant, Miss May, is shown to be Root.
39	16	"Relevance"	Jonathan Nolan	Amanda Segel & Jonathan Nolan	February 21, 2013	2J7216	14.22
The Machine gives the numbers of Sameen Shaw (Sarah Shahi), a government assassin, and Michael Cole (Ebon Moss-Bachrach), a computer specialist working for Special Counsel (Jay O. Sanders). Special Counsel has sent a hit team to eliminate Shaw and Cole because Cole may have obtained information on the Machine. They kill Cole but Shaw escapes, shooting Reese, who she believes is another assassin. Root captures and interrogates Shaw but leaves abruptly to avoid another hit team from Special Counsel. Reese saves her and Finch explains her "Research" does not actually exist, implying it is the Machine, and offers his aid to her, which she refuses. She confronts Special Counsel, and returns the flash drive with the information Cole had recovered, then kills the subordinate who had ordered her and Cole's death. Special Counsel allows her to leave, but Hersh finds her and injects her with poison. Leon Tao (disguised as a paramedic), Carter, and Fusco take charge of the apparently dead body and drive away. Tao, as directed by Reese, injects her with an antidote. Shaw, fully recovered, meets with Reese and Finch in a graveyard and accepts Finch's card.
40	17	"Proteus"	Kenneth Fink	Sean Hennen	March 7, 2013	2J7217	14.57
After being silent for three days, when the Machine generates numbers of six missing people, Reese, Finch, and Detective Carter realize that they are hunting a serial killer who assumes the identity of his victims. Reese encounters FBI agent Alan Fahey (Luke Macfarlane) at Owen Island during his search for the same killer. Due to a severe storm, residents of the island take shelter in the police station. Finch arrives at the island and assists Fahey interrogate the people in the station. Carter, having researched the six victims, goes to help Finch and Reese. Meanwhile, Finch and Reese discover that the killer is actually masquerading as Agent Fahey, whom he had killed before Reese arrived on the island. The killer captures Finch before Carter arrives and saves him before Beecher shoots the killer dead. Finch and Reese later ponder why the Machine was silent for three days, with Finch suspecting that the virus Kara Stanton uploaded to the Department of Defense has infected the Machine and slowed its abilities. He tells Reese that he believes this is the beginning of a coming storm.
41	18	"All In"	Tricia Brock	Lucas O'Connor	March 14, 2013	2J7218	14.34
The Machine generates the number of watch repairman Lou Mitchell (Ron McLarty), who is consistently losing large sums of money at a casino. He and many other elderly gamblers are actually victims of a drug-money laundering operation headed by the casino's owner Dario Makris (Michael Rispoli). Finch breaks into the casino server room and gathers the needed evidence, but is caught and taken hostage along with Reese, Leon, and Lou. They are forced to play a game of Russian roulette, but Reese gets them out alive after Lou sneaks the bullet out before it enters the gun. Meanwhile, HR incriminates Detective Szymanski (Michael McGlone) so the head of the Russian mob can be exonerated and give financial support to HR. Cal Beecher was the one who told IAB that Szymanski was corrupt, acting on information from one of Beecher's CIs. Carter succeeds in clearing Szymanski, but he is later killed along with the ADA by HR boss Alonzo Quinn, who makes it look like an assassination by an outside figure. Detective Terney (Al Sapienza) of the homicide task force is revealed to be an HR operative, potentially watching Fusco and Carter.
42	19	"Trojan Horse"	Jeffrey Hunt	Dan Dietz & Erik Mountain	April 4, 2013	2J7219	14.57
Reese monitors Michael Cole's family where Shaw finds him. Finch calls with a new number, that of Monica Jacobs (Tracie Thoms), a high-ranking employee of a technology company called Rylatech. Jacobs is being hunted and framed for industrial espionage by other employees who are secretly working as spies for China and Greer's shadowy company Decima Technologies. Meanwhile, Shaw tracks Finch to the library, where she grabs a list of Root's aliases from the wall, telling Finch she has a new project. While monitoring Beecher, Fusco discovers that he's innocent of any wrongdoing. Meanwhile, Quinn realizes that Beecher knows too much about his role in HR, and arranges to have him killed. The Machine gives Finch his number, but too late for Carter and Fusco to save him. The next morning, Finch is taking a walk around town with Reese, telling him that he has identified Decima Technologies, the company which employed Kara Stanton to upload a virus onto the Machine. Unknowingly behind them, Greer is on the phone, and when he hangs up, he looks at his phone, which has a countdown ticking on it, and smiles.
43	20	"In Extremis"	Chris Fisher	Greg Plageman & Tony Camerino	April 25, 2013	2J7220	13.22
When a highly decorated doctor named Richard Nelson (Dennis Boutsikaris) is poisoned with a fatal dose of radiation, Reese is forced to partner with Nelson to track down the killer after they both realize that the radiation has no antidote. Unable to save Nelson, the two poison the killer with the same toxin. Flashbacks explore how Detective Fusco became involved with HR and the development of his friendship with Detective Stills. Meanwhile, HR has an informant give the Internal Affairs Bureau the location of Stills' body so that they can send Fusco to prison in retaliation for him quitting. Fusco confesses his past to Carter who is forced to evaluate her partnership with Fusco and how she might help him with the problems he is facing. With the help of Bear, Carter finds and moves Stills' body while Finch has Elias get the informant to recant. The Machine displays the coded blue screens with increasing frequency as it becomes apparent to Finch and Reese that the numbers are coming too late, leading to Dr. Nelson's death. As the episode ends, the Machine sends a series of alerts before beginning the process of shutting down its primary functions.
44	21	"Zero Day"	Jeffrey Hunt	Amanda Segel & David Slack	May 2, 2013	2J7221	12.96
Special Counsel discovers that there is a threat to the Machine, which Finch and Reese are attempting to stop. The Machine gives a number belonging to Ernest Thornhill, a CEO who is buying several payphone companies in New York. Decima Technologies, Finch, Root, Shaw and Reese all attempt to reach Thornhill, but Finch discovers that Thornhill is an alias created by the Machine. Root and Finch enter Thornhill Enterprises and discover that the Machine will reboot to defend against the virus, once complete giving Admin access to who ever receives a call. Reese and Shaw follow and encounter Greer and his men. Greer tells Reese that the laptop Reese had to recover with Kara Stanton from China was sent there by Finch. Finch knows which payphone the Machine is going to call and goes with Root to answer, followed by Shaw and Reese, where they encounter Greer's men. When the call comes, Root answers the phone, but Finch splices the call to a payphone near Reese so he too can answer the phone.
45	22	"God Mode"	Richard J. Lewis	Patrick Harbinson & Jonathan Nolan	May 9, 2013	2J7222	13.16
The Machine grants both Reese and Root full administrative access and saves Reese (with Shaw) and Root (with Finch) from several potential threats. Root and Finch arrive at the Hanford nuclear facility where the Machine is kept, followed shortly by Reese and Shaw, the latter being slowed as the Machine directs them to rescue people from the irrelevant list. They find that the Machine has moved. Finch explains that he planted hidden code inside the Machine that would grant it the freedom to protect itself if it was at risk, code triggered by the virus from the Ordos laptop. For failing to protect the machine, an unknown woman orders Hersh to kill Special Counsel. Meanwhile, Raymond Terney (HR) and Peter Yogorov attempt to kill Carl Elias. They are stopped by a masked Detective Carter, who wounds Terney and Yogorov and frees Elias. A payphone later calls Reese and Finch. Hersh talks with the unknown woman confirming that they received a relevant number. The Machine then calls Root. In flashbacks, Ingram plans to tell the press about the Machine, but Hersh manipulates a suicide bomber into detonating a bomb on a ferry where Ingram and Finch are meeting. Ingram is killed while Finch is injured. Grace believes Harold to have died in the explosion.

== Development ==
=== Production ===
The series was renewed for a second season in March 2012.

=== Writing ===
Nolan said that even though they would continue developing the characters and season-long story arcs, the season would remain a procedural. He compared it to The X-Files, which he deemed a major influence on the show. Showrunner and executive producer Greg Plageman added, "We hate it when we watch a show that has a serialized content, there's a cliffhanger where somebody is placed in jeopardy, and then you come back the next episode and it's like nothing happened. We don't want to do that." Plageman also said, "the nice thing about working with [Jonah] is you never want to feel like you totally nailed it; you want to keep changing and evolving the show. There's always the danger of falling into a rut and feeling formulaic, and we've tried to shy away from that. What we have found is a nice chemistry between our characters that works, but we always reserve the right to surprise the viewers with a twist or a killing."

Michael Emerson teased, "The arc of the show is a contract between writers and the audience. I'm just the one who solves the little problems in the scenes themselves." The writers said that the first episode, "The Contingency", served as a way to get Reese to act on his own while searching for Finch and it would also answer an important question raised by the series: "Who does the Machine turn to?"

The writers also explained that they had plans for Amy Acker in the series, following her character's debut on "Firewall". Nolan explained, "Root is stone-cold but it's considered. We don't think of her as a psychopath but someone who is in her own way sympathetic. And the case she is trying to make is, in many ways, something Finch can relate to. You have all these people who want to manipulate the Machine, and Root wants to set it free. What that means, and how her plan ultimately plays out, is something that we're going to see through the course of the season." After the first two episodes, Acker stated that she would return to the series eventually at some point in the season, saying "I think he [Finch] misses me too much." She further added, "And when I do, it's a roller coaster of lots of trouble. A lot of stuff escalates."

The writers explained that among concepts explored the season include: the origins of the Machine and more character development for the main characters. A pivotal moment was Fusco, with star Kevin Chapman saying, "at some point Fusco is going to have to answer for his past.' Chapman said that the season would delve into the question, "is he a good guy doing bad things, or a bad guy doing good things?" Nolan also teased, "the thing we're trying to do with this show, as much as we can, is to keep it dangerous and alive, and keep the narrative unexpected."

=== Casting ===
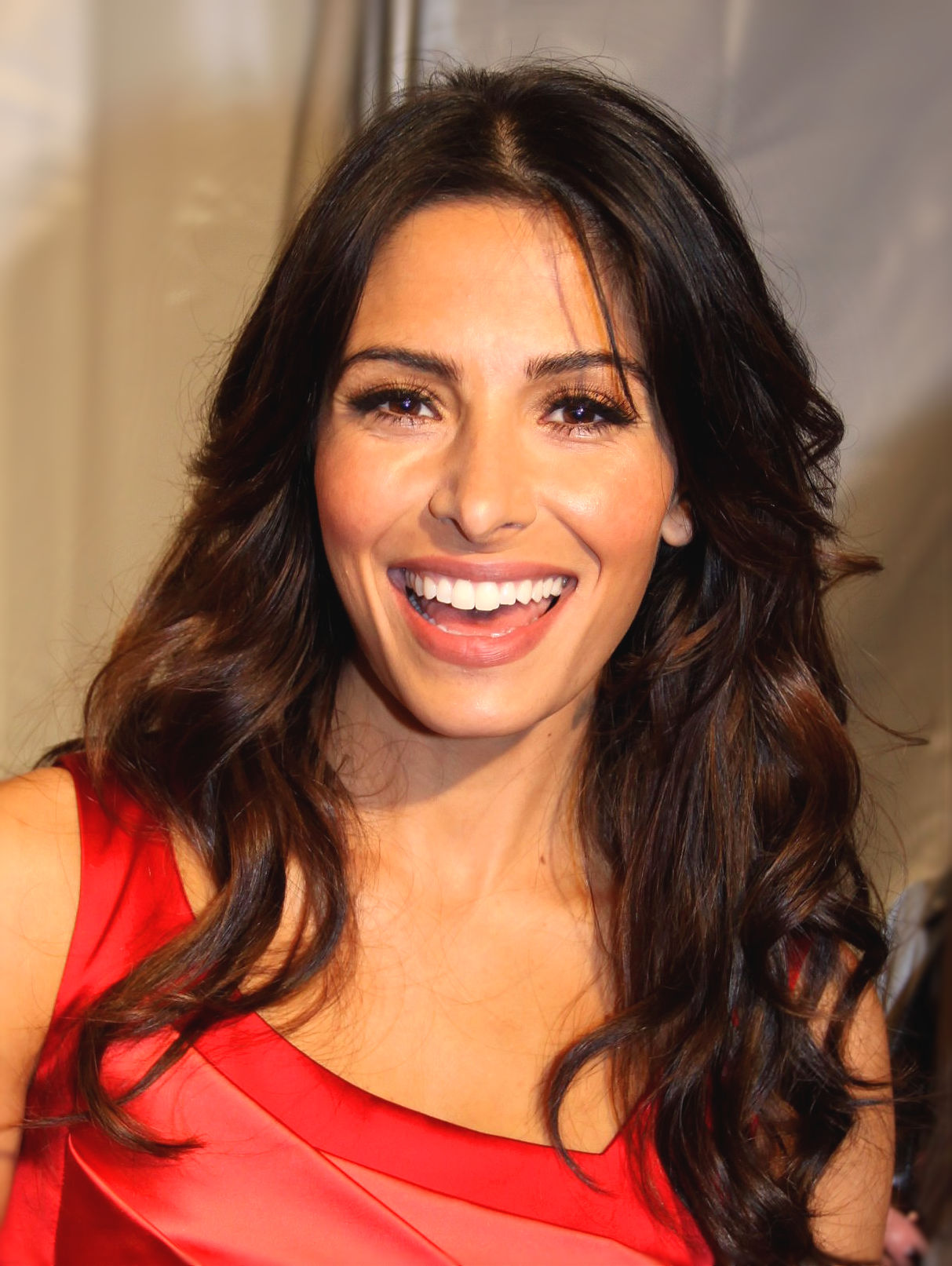
The season marked the introduction of Sameen Shaw, portrayed by Sarah Shahi. Shahi would later be upgraded to series regular in the third season.

Caviezel, Henson, Chapman and Emerson reprised their roles from the first season as series regulars. Among many characters that were confirmed to return at the beginning of the season included Jay O. Sanders as Special Counsel, Robert John Burke as Patrick Simmons, Annie Parisse as Kara Stanton and Michael Kelly as Mark Snow. The fifth episode, "Bury the Lede" also brought back Paige Turco as Zoe Morgan. Nolan commented, "Paige is spectacular, and sometimes you get that rare alchemy of a piece of casting and a character that just connects. So she'll come back to further complicate things."

Among the many guest stars for the season include Ken Leung and Margo Martindale, who were announced to join the season's first two episodes in July 2012. In August 2012, Paloma Guzmán and Gloria Votsis were announced to get guest star roles in the season. In October 2012, it was reported that Mark Pellegrino would also guest star as "an edgy and charming head of a popular publishing empire." Pellegrino reunited with Emerson, having starred with him on Lost. In the same month, Sterling K. Brown joined in the recurring role of Cal Beecher, "a no-nonsense narcotics detective who will evolve into a potential love interest for Taraji P. Henson's Detective Carter." This was partly done by the writers in order to explore "a little more about Carter's personal life, what makes her tick. We're hoping to explore who she is and how she became who she is."

Model Karolína Kurková was reported to guest star on an episode as herself. She appeared on "Prisoner's Dilemma" in a subplot where Fusco protects Kurková from Armenian gangsters. The subplot, which is interspersed throughout the episode, takes up less than two minutes of screen time and is played for comic relief.

In January 2013, Sarah Shahi joined the series in a recurring role as Sameen Shaw, "a fearless, sexy and witty operative in a secret paramilitary organization that tracks and eliminates terrorists before they can act." Shaw, who debuted in "Relevance", was deemed an important part of the second season and the writers were open to having her in the third season even before it was officially announced. Nolan described her role as "if James Bond and Sarah Connor had a kid, Shaw would kick its ass." The role, which required Shahi to undergo thorough training for 7 days in order to fight and use weapons, was important for Shahi, who wanted to work with Nolan. She deemed it a role she had never played before. She further said, "I'm used to a lot of love scenes. I'm used to something that requires me to kick up my heels and wink-wink, flirt-flirt with a twirl of my skirt. But this is dark. It's a bit stylized. It's a heightened sense of drama, all the time. The tomboyishness that came out of me doing this was kind of amazing, and I hope just people buy the end result, because it felt really good and quite natural to just kick somebody's ass." Shortly after the series was renewed for a third season, Shahi would be promoted to series regular.

The season also marked the first appearance of two pivotal villains of the series. The first was Clarke Peters as Alonzo Quinn, the head of HR, first appearing on "Bury the Lede". The second was John Nolan as John Greer, first appearing on "Dead Reckoning" and who would serve as the main antagonist of the series until the end of the series. John Nolan was series creator Jonathan Nolan's uncle, with Nolan commenting, "Look, the best bad guys are always English. That's just kind of a rule. And so my uncle came on board in exactly the same fashion as all of these actors, as a memorable turn that became a longer story arc." The season also introduced Control, who would play a pivotal role in the third and fourth season. The producers teased her character before the finale, naming her Mrs. Penn, "a powerful, intelligent and wry 50something femme who never flinches in the face of danger." Control only appears in the season finale by an unseen actress. Camryn Manheim would later appear as the character in the third season.

=== Filming ===
Filming in New York City in October was shut down for a few days due to Hurricane Sandy. Production resumed shortly afterward around early November. In February 2013, a major blizzard hit the area but production continued without interruption.

== Release ==
=== Broadcast ===
In May 2012, CBS announced that the series would maintain its timeslot, airing episodes on Thursdays at 9:00 p.m. In July 2012, CBS announced that the series would premiere on September 27, 2012.

=== Marketing ===
On July 14, 2012, the cast and crew attended the 2012 San Diego Comic-Con to discuss and promote the season and show a sneak peek. Jonathan Nolan, Michael Emerson, Taraji P. Henson, and Kevin Chapman also attended the 2012 New York Comic Con on October 13, 2012, for a Q&A session as well as interviews. The panel also included a surprise appearance by Amy Acker.

=== Home media release ===
The second season was released on Blu-ray and DVD in region 1 on September 3, 2013, in region 2 on June 16, 2014, and in region 4 on October 16, 2013.

In 2014, Warner Bros. Television Studios announced that it sold the off-network SVOD of the series to Netflix. On September 1, 2015, the season became available to stream on Netflix. On September 22, 2020, the series left the service and was added to HBO Max on January 23, 2021.

== Reception ==
=== Ratings ===
Viewership and ratings per episode of Person of Interest season 2
No.	Title	Air date	Rating/share (18–49)	Viewers (millions)	DVR (18–49)	DVR viewers (millions)	Total (18–49)	Total viewers (millions)
1	"The Contingency"	September 27, 2012	2.9/8	14.28	1.2	3.56	4.1	17.83
2	"Bad Code"	October 4, 2012	3.0/8	14.58	0.9	3.03	3.9	17.62
3	"Masquerade"	October 18, 2012	2.8/7	13.93	1.1	3.49	3.9	17.42
4	"Triggerman"	October 25, 2012	2.9/8	14.03	1.1	3.37	4.0	17.40
5	"Bury the Lede"	November 1, 2012	2.9/7	13.66	0.9	3.15	3.8	16.81
6	"The High Road"	November 8, 2012	2.9/8	14.87	1.0	3.24	3.9	18.11
7	"Critical"	November 15, 2012	3.1/8	14.57	1.0	3.40	4.1	17.97
8	"'Til Death"	November 29, 2012	2.9/7	14.43	1.2	3.52	4.1	17.95
9	"C.O.D."	December 6, 2012	2.9/8	14.18	1.1	3.42	4.0	17.60
10	"Shadow Box"	December 13, 2012	2.9/8	14.08	1.1	3.36	4.0	17.44
11	"2$\pi$R"	January 3, 2013	3.4/9	16.23	1.1	3.53	4.5	19.76
12	"Prisoner's Dilemma"	January 10, 2013	3.3/9	15.67	1.0	3.37	4.3	19.04
13	"Dead Reckoning"	January 31, 2013	3.2/9	15.71	1.1	3.62	4.3	19.33
14	"One Percent"	February 7, 2013	3.1/8	14.88	1.0	3.50	4.1	18.38
15	"Booked Solid"	February 14, 2013	3.0/8	14.87	1.0	3.47	4.0	18.34
16	"Relevance"	February 21, 2013	2.9/7	14.22	1.1	3.63	4.0	17.84
17	"Proteus"	March 7, 2013	2.8/8	14.57	1.1	3.76	3.9	18.33
18	"All In"	March 14, 2013	2.9/8	14.34	0.9	3.21	3.8	17.55
19	"Trojan Horse"	April 4, 2013	2.7/8	14.57	1.0	3.48	3.7	18.05
20	"In Extremis"	April 25, 2013	2.4/7	13.22	1.0	3.22	3.4	16.44
21	"Zero Day"	May 2, 2013	2.4/7	12.96	0.9	3.36	3.3	16.32
22	"God Mode"	May 9, 2013	2.4/7	13.16	0.9	3.33	3.3	16.49

=== Critical reception ===
The second season received positive reviews. On Rotten Tomatoes, the season has an approval rating of 100% and average rating of 8 out of 10 based on 8 reviews. The site's critical consensus is, "Smartly plotted and consistently thrilling, Person of Interest's second season delivers dazzlingly dramatic episodes that skillfully develop the show's overarching narrative."

Tim Surette praised the premiere episode as "vintage Person of Interest amplified, showing off its trademark combination of complex intrigue, creative action, and clever innovation in bigger ways than ever before." He praised guest star Ken Leung's character as "one of the greatest POIs the series has had" and praised the episode's overall narrative, as well as the flashbacks. "Prisoner's Dilemma" and "Relevance" were the two highest-rated episodes of the season, with Surette calling the former "as complete an episode of Person of Interest as there's ever been" and The A.V. Club's Phil Dyess-Nugent praising Jonathan Nolan's directorial work in the latter. The season finale "God Mode" also attracted positive reactions. Nugent called it an "unapologetically kick-ass episode" with some "terrific action set-pieces".
