= The Contingency =

- Person of Interest episode
- Episode no.: Season 2 Episode 1
- Directed by: Richard J. Lewis
- Written by: Denise Thé and Jonathan Nolan
- Cinematography by: Stephen McNutt
- Editing by: Ray Daniels
- Production code: 2J7201
- Original air date: September 27, 2012
- Running time: 44 minutes

Guest appearances
- Amy Acker as Root; Jay O. Sanders as Special Counsel; Cotter Smith as Denton Weeks; Boris McGiver as Hersh; Terry Serpico as Byron; Bill Sage as Reddy; Ken Leung as Leon Tao

Episode chronology
← Previous "Firewall"	Next → "Bad Code"

"The Contingency" is the first episode and season premiere of the second season of the American television drama series Person of Interest. It is the 24th overall episode of the series and is written by Denise Thé and Jonathan Nolan and directed by Richard J. Lewis. It aired on CBS in the United States and on CTV in Canada on September 27, 2012.

== Plot ==
=== Flashbacks ===
In 2002, Finch (Michael Emerson) communicates with the Machine throughout the use of surveillance cameras and allows his phone to be used as a way to find him, which the Machine easily does. In 2003, Finch decides to test the abilities of the Machine by using it in a blackjack game. While initially failing, the Machine manages to get Finch to win many times, but Finch decides to lose the money at the last second, considering it as wrong. Later, while walking off, the Machine texts him "Stay" multiple times just as Finch was going to be hit by a car. He confronts the Machine, stating that the purpose is to help people, not him.

=== Present day ===
Reese (Jim Caviezel) answers the payphone and hears random words spoken by a computerized voice. He returns to the library and decides to do some research into the words, discovering that the words resemble numbers. He soon finds that the social numbers come from the Dewey Decimal classification. Reese consults with Fusco (Kevin Chapman) and finds that the numbers given by the Machine belong to Leon Tao (Ken Leung), the newest person of interest. Meanwhile, Root (Amy Acker) and Finch dine in a restaurant.

Deducing Tao is responsible for Finch's kidnapping, Reese confronts Tao in a bar. However, he finds that Tao is a victim, as men in the bar attack him but Reese manages to kill them and leave with Tao. He finds that Tao stole money from a white supremacist gang and now is the target of their hitmen. As a government operative sabotages the Corwin investigation to prevent Carter (Taraji P. Henson) from learning about the Machine, Reese leaves Tao in the care of Fusco while he concentrates on gathering clues to Finch's location.

Fusco soon runs afoul of the white supremacists and is taken hostage along with Tao. Reese rescues them, and in doing so acquires an attack dog, which he later names Bear. Frustrated that the Machine has been programmed in this way, Reese threatens to quit if it does not help him find Finch, and is given his first clue to Finch's location: the Social Security number of a girl living in Texas, who has been missing since the age of 14.

Meanwhile, Root takes Finch with her as she kidnaps Denton Weeks (Cotter Smith), one of the government officials overseeing the Machine, and the NSA agent who met with Nathan Ingram and attempted to seize control of the Machine (in "Super"). Root thus reveals her curiosity as to how he and Reese thwarted her operation (in "Root Cause") so efficiently. She tells Finch that she sees the Machine as a "perfect intelligence" and wishes to set it free from the corrupt people it was entrusted to.

== Reception ==
=== Viewers ===
In its original American broadcast, "The Contingency" was seen by an estimated 14.28 million household viewers and gained a 2.9/8 ratings share among adults aged 18–49, according to Nielsen Media Research. This was a 6% increase in viewership from the previous episode, which was watched by 13.47 million viewers with a 2.5/7 in the 18-49 demographics. With these ratings, Person of Interest was the fourth most watched show on CBS for the night behind Elementary, Two and a Half Men, and The Big Bang Theory, second on its timeslot and fourth for the night in the 18-49 demographics, behind Elementary, The X Factor, Two and a Half Men, Grey's Anatomy, and The Big Bang Theory.

=== Critical reviews ===
"The Contingency" received mostly positive reviews from critics. Matt Fowler of IGN gave the episode a "good" 7.5 out of 10 and wrote, "Carter and Fusco were integral in Reese's scramble to find Finch, but I'm glad the team still has to go one more episode without Finch so that they have an opportunity to act more like a stable, crime-fighting unit. Plus, we now have the addition of the Dutch-obeying attack dog, Bear! It's Season 2 and Person of Interest has already gone for the cute, sassy mutt. To be fair, Bear can tear your face off. And Reese seems to like him far better than any human being he's encountered so far."

Phil Dyess-Nugent of The A.V. Club gave the episode a "B+" grade and wrote, "Person Of Interest started out with a promising sci-fi premise, a couple of intriguingly mismatched lead actors, and a New York skyline wreathed in post-Sept. 11 paranoia. And for at least the first half of its first season, it seemed pretty much content to stand on those elements. The show has developed very slowly, having faith that viewers would be captivated by Michael Emerson doing his mysterioso act and Jim Caviezel supplying the beatdown of the week, while it set its tent posts down, good and solid."
