= Firewall (Person of Interest) =

- Person of Interest episode
- Episode no.: Season 1 Episode 23
- Directed by: Richard J. Lewis
- Written by: Greg Plageman & Jonathan Nolan
- Cinematography by: Teodoro Maniaci
- Editing by: Ray Daniels
- Production code: 2J6223
- Original air date: May 17, 2012
- Running time: 44 minutes

Guest appearances
- Paige Turco as Zoe Morgan; Robert John Burke as Patrick Simmons; Amy Acker as Catherine Turing; Brennan Brown as Nicholas Donnelly; Elizabeth Marvel as Alicia Corwin; Anthony DeSando as Hans Friedrickson; Aaron Lazar as Terrance Baxter; Wayne Duvall as Seth Larsson; Jason Kolotouros as Jablonski; Johnny Wu as Tech

Episode chronology
← Previous "No Good Deed"	Next → "The Contingency"

"Firewall" is the twenty-third episode and season finale of the first season of the American television drama series Person of Interest. It is the 23rd overall episode of the series and is written by Greg Plageman & Jonathan Nolan and directed by Richard J. Lewis. It aired on CBS in the United States and on CTV in Canada on May 17, 2012.

== Plot ==
Finch (Michael Emerson) calls Carter (Taraji P. Henson), asking her to help Reese (Jim Caviezel). However, she is debriefed by Agent Donnelly (Brennan Brown) on their newest information: they've managed to locate Reese, who is seen escorting a woman in the streets.

A day ago, Reese and Finch received a new number: Caroline Turing (Amy Acker), a psychologist. Reese begins surveillance on her by posing as a patient. Meanwhile, Fusco (Kevin Chapman) is summoned by HR and meets with councilman Larsson (Wayne Duvall) and Officer Patrick Simmons (Robert John Burke), who state that they have taken on a murder for hire. An anonymous client assigned them to kill Turing and Fusco is notified to obstruct any investigation from the NYPD.

Reese gets in contact with Zoe Morgan (Paige Turco), who manages to get him information regarding any threat against Turing. Reese saves Turing from being killed by assailants in the street and takes her to a hotel for safety. His face is detected by the cameras and the FBI conduct an investigation, and send a strike team to catch Reese. The hotel is surrounded by FBI operatives looking for Reese as well as HR members looking for Turing. With the help from Carter (Taraji P. Henson), Reese and Turing manage to evade the police. While Finch assists in hacking the system, Alicia Corwin (Elizabeth Marvel) breaks into the Library.

Zoe interrogates one of the threats and finds that the person was blackmailed to act as a threat to Turing by an unknown benefactor. Reese manages to help Turing to escape the hotel through a water plant to reach Finch, while he holds back the HR shooters. Carter and Fusco arrive and help him chase HR in a high speed chase but Reese uses a detonator he hid earlier to explode HR's car. Finch waits for Turing in his car where he is confronted at gunpoint by Corwin, who demands he shut down the Machine.

Suddenly, Corwin is shot in the head by Turing. Just as Zoe sneaks into Turing's office, her records are getting deleted, discovering that Turing is in fact "Root". Root was the person who hired HR to plan her own murder, which would make her a person of interest - the real target was Finch. Reese arrives at Finch's location only to find Corwin's corpse. Fusco manages to send evidence to the NYPD about HR, facilitating the arrest of the mole inside the corp. Reese goes to a public surveillance camera, talking directly to the Machine, asking it to help him find Finch. A payphone rings nearby and Reese answers it.

== Production ==
=== Writing ===
Co-writer and executive producer Greg Plageman deemed the scene where Root psychoanalyzes Reese as the toughest scene he ever wrote, saying "Both characters are lying about their true identity while trying to elicit personal information about the other. The fact that Root manages to hit so close to home about Reese's true nature is as fun as it is unsettling for him. And it's even more fun to watch in hindsight when you realize who she really is."

== Reception ==
=== Viewers ===
In its original American broadcast, "Firewall" was seen by an estimated 13.47 million household viewers and gained a 2.5/7 ratings share among adults aged 18–49, according to Nielsen Media Research. This was a 4% increase in viewership from the previous episode, which was watched by 12.96 million viewers with a 2.6/7 in the 18-49 demographics. With these ratings, Person of Interest was the most watched show on CBS for the night beating The Mentalist, and Rules of Engagement, second on its timeslot and fourth for the night in the 18-49 demographics, behind Grey's Anatomy, a rerun of The Big Bang Theory, and American Idol.

=== Critical reviews ===
"Firewall" received mostly positive reviews from critics. Matt Fowler of IGN gave the episode a "great" 8.5 out of 10 and wrote, "'Firewall' was exciting, sure. And it felt like a lot of things were converging/culminating on an FBI hunt/HR level. But I think the biggest thing it had going for it, aside from the 'Root' reveal at the end, was Fusco and Carter finally finding out that they're both on the same side. In many respects, this first season was an exercise in team-building; creating a full pre-crime fighting support system while also enriching the bond between Reese and Finch. Now they can head into Season 2 as more of a force."

Phil Dyess-Nugent of The A.V. Club gave the episode a "B+" grade and wrote, "Person Of Interest has devoted some of its recent episodes to humanizing Reese and Finch by revealing what shame they keep bottled up inside and what losses they've suffered, and while some of this has been effective, the show might be bloodless and ice-cold if it weren't for the characters on the margins, who aren't as free of doubt and technical perfection as its heroes. Few series characters have been introduced in as imperfect form as Kevin Chapman's Fusco, but over the course of the season, he's grown from a singularly charmless, one-dimensional corrupt cop into a man relearning how good it feels to do good, and in the process, turned into the heart of the show."
