= Relevance (Person of Interest) =

- Person of Interest episode
- Episode no.: Season 2 Episode 16
- Directed by: Jonathan Nolan
- Written by: Amanda Segel; Jonathan Nolan
- Cinematography by: Manuel Billeter
- Editing by: Ray Daniels
- Production code: 2J7216
- Original air date: February 21, 2013
- Running time: 43 minutes

Guest appearances
- Sarah Shahi as Sameen Shaw; Ebon Moss-Bachrach as Michael Cole; Amy Acker as Root; Jay O. Sanders as Special Counsel; Boris McGiver as Hersh; Ken Leung as Leon Tao; Paul Sparks as Wilson

Episode chronology
← Previous "Booked Solid"	Next → "Proteus"

"Relevance" is the sixteenth episode of the second season of the American television drama series Person of Interest. It is the 39th overall episode of the series and is written by Amanda Segel and series creator Jonathan Nolan and directed by Nolan. It aired on CBS in the United States and on CTV in Canada on February 21, 2013.

The plot finds government operative Sameen Shaw (Sarah Shahi) who tracks and stops terrorist threats before they occur on the run and the focus of Finch and Reese's attention. Their pursuit proves to be formidable when they discover that her skill set rivals their own.

Upon airing, the episode received ratings of 14.22 million in the United States, including 2.9 million adults aged 18–49. It received very positive reviews from critics, praising its writing, Nolan's direction and Shahi's performance.

== Plot ==
Sameen Shaw, a government assassin, and Michael Cole, a computer specialist/operative working for Special Counsel, neutralize a terrorist plot, acting on information from a Pentagon group called "Research". Cole suspects that Research may sometimes be wrong, having found out from the Social Security number belonging to an electrical engineer they had previously killed that he was hired by the US government, not by terrorists. The Machine meanwhile gives their numbers to Reese and Finch, since their lives are now in danger. A hit team is sent by Special Counsel to eliminate Shaw and Cole, because Cole may have obtained information on the Machine. They kill Cole. Shaw escapes with help from Reese, whom she shoots, believing him to be another assassin.

While on the run, Shaw is captured and tied up by Root, who believes she may hold the key to the Machine's location and plans to interrogate her. Root leaves abruptly to avoid another hit team sent by Special Counsel. Just as the new hit team are about to kill Shaw, Reese saves her. He brings her to meet Finch, who explains that "Research" does not actually exist (implying it is, in fact, the Machine), and offers his aid to her. She refuses, so he offers her his card, which she looks at, but politely declines. She goes to confront who she believes to be Control (head of the ISA's operations using the Machine) but ends up meeting Special Counsel, and surprisingly returns the flash drive to him with the information Cole had recovered. She then kills the subordinate who had ordered her and Cole's death.

Special Counsel allows Shaw to leave, but later her old mentor Hersh surprises her on a crowded street, injecting her with poison. Former POI Leon Tao—disguised as a paramedic—Carter, and Fusco take charge of the apparently dead body and drive away. On Reese's orders, Tao saves Shaw using atropine, leaving the ISA believing her to be dead. Shaw, fully recovered after a sedative Tao had to give her, meets with Reese and Finch in a graveyard. Although again refusing their aid, this time she accepts Finch's card.

== Reception ==
=== Ratings ===
"Relevance" received ratings of 14.22 million in the United States, including 2.9 million adults aged 18–49.

=== Critical reception ===
Upon airing, the episode received nearly universal critical acclaim, with critics regarding that this had been the best episode of "Person of Interest" thus far. In his review of "Relevance," Phil Dyess-Nugent of The A.V. Club gave the episode an A rating, and said that, with the directing debut of series creator Jonathan Nolan, "his work here has the confidence and verve of someone who understands the world he’s created, and the rules of the game his show plays with viewers, well enough that he can mess around with the formula a little" and "illuminate and expand on Person Of Interest’s series mythology." Annale Newitz at io9 also praised the episode, saying that it "delivers one of the best hours of TV you'll ever see."
