= Person of Interest season 1 =

Season of television series

Person of Interest
- Season 1
- Home media cover art
- Starring: Jim Caviezel; Taraji P. Henson; Kevin Chapman; Michael Emerson
- No. of episodes: 23

Release
- Original network: CBS
- Original release: September 22, 2011 – May 17, 2012

Season chronology
- Next → Season 2

The first season of the American television series Person of Interest premiered on September 22, 2011, and ended on May 17, 2012. The season is produced by Kilter Films, Bad Robot, and Warner Bros. Television, with Jonathan Nolan, Greg Plageman, J. J. Abrams, and Bryan Burk serving as executive producers and Plageman serving as showrunner.

The series was ordered to series in May 2011 and stars Jim Caviezel, Taraji P. Henson, Kevin Chapman, and Michael Emerson. The series revolves around a mysterious reclusive billionaire computer programmer, Harold Finch, who has developed a computer program for the federal government known as "the Machine" that is capable of collating all sources of information to predict terrorist acts and to identify people planning them. The Machine also identifies perpetrators and victims of other premeditated deadly crimes; however, because the government considers these "irrelevant", Finch programs the Machine to delete this information each night and programs the Machine to notify him secretly of the "irrelevant" numbers. Finch recruits John Reese, a former Green Beret and CIA agent, now presumed dead – to investigate the people identified by the numbers the Machine has provided, and to act accordingly.

The season premiered with a 13-episode order before being given a 9-episode back-order in October 2011. In March 2012, one more episode was ordered, bringing its total to 23 episodes. The series premiere garnered 13.33 million viewers with a 3.1/8 ratings share in the 18–49 demographics, winning its time slot. The season ended with an average of 14.34 million viewers, ranking as the 13th most watched series of the season. The season initially received generally positive reviews from critics, who praised its potential while some criticized its characterization and lack of character development. Reception grew more positive as the season went on, with critics highlighting the exploration of mass surveillance and repercussions of its actions, with the season finale particularly receiving acclaim. In March 2012, CBS renewed the series for a second season.

== Season summary ==
John Reese (Jim Caviezel), a former Special Forces soldier and CIA operative, is burnt out and presumed dead, living as a vagrant in New York City. He is approached by Harold Finch (Michael Emerson), a reclusive billionaire software genius who built a computer system for the U.S. government after September 11, 2001 which monitors all electronic communications and surveillance video feeds, in order to predict future terrorist activities. The computer – known informally as "the Machine", and funded under the codename "Northern Lights" – also predicts other lethal crimes as well, but being irrelevant to national security these were deleted daily.

To prevent abuse of its capabilities, Finch had programmed the Machine to only provide an identity of a person predicted to be involved in an imminent lethal crime, in the form of a Social Security number, but no details of the crime or whether the person of interest is a perpetrator or victim. Those involved in creating Northern Lights, such as Finch's best friend and business partner Nathan Ingram, have largely been killed by the authorities to hide the project's existence. Finch realises that knowledge of the victims deemed "irrelevant" would have saved his partner, and decides to act covertly on the non-terrorism predictions. He hires Reese to conduct surveillance and intervene in these cases. Finch and Reese attempt to understand the threat to, or by, people whose numbers the Machine provides, and try to stop the crime from occurring. They are helped by NYPD Detectives Lionel Fusco (Kevin Chapman), a formerly-corrupt officer whom Reese coerces into helping them, and Joss Carter (Taraji P. Henson), who initially investigates Reese for his vigilante activities.

== Cast and characters ==
=== Main ===
- Jim Caviezel as John Reese
- Taraji P. Henson as Detective Jocelyn "Joss" Carter
- Kevin Chapman as Detective Lionel Fusco
- Michael Emerson as Harold Finch

=== Recurring ===
- Enrico Colantoni as Charlie Burton/Carl Elias
- Elizabeth Marvel as Alicia Corwin
- Susan Misner as Jessica Arndt
- Brennan Brown as FBI Agent Nicholas Donnelly
- Robert John Burke as Officer Patrick Simmons
- Michael Kelly as CIA Agent Mark Snow
- Anthony Mangano as Detective Kane
- Al Sapienza as Detective Raymond Terney
- David Valcin as Anthony S. Marconi/Scarface
- Brett Cullen as Nathan Ingram
- Mark Margolis as Don Gianni Moretti
- Michael Mulheren as Captain Artie Lynch
- John Fiore as Captain Womack
- Darien Sills-Evans as CIA Agent Tyrell Evans
- Annie Parisse as CIA Agent Kara Stanton
- Paige Turco as Zoe Morgan
- Sean McCarthy as Lee Fusco
- Kwoade Cross as Taylor Carter
- Michael McGlone as Detective Bill Szymanski
- Michael Stahl-David as Will Ingram

=== Notable guests ===
- Natalie Zea as ADA Diane Hansen ("Pilot")
- Chris Chalk as Lawrence Pope ("Pilot")
- James Hanlon as Detective James Stills ("Pilot")
- Brian d'Arcy James as ADA James Wheeler ("Pilot")
- James Carpinello as Joey Durban ("Mission Creep")
- Linda Cardellini as Dr. Megan Tillman ("Cura Te Ipsum")
- David Costabile as Judge Samuel Gates ("Judgment")
- Michael Cerveris as Jarek Koska ("Judgment")
- Enver Gjokaj as Laszlo Yogorov ("Witness")
- Alan Dale as Ulrich Kohl ("Foe")
- David Zayas as Ernest Trask ("Super")
- Cotter Smith as Denton Weeks ("Super")
- Astro as Darren McGrady ("Wolf and Cub")
- Malik Yoba as Andre Wilcox ("Wolf and Cub")
- José Zúñiga as Neil Vargas ("Blue Code")
- Reg E. Cathey as IAB Detective Ian Davidson ("Blue Code")
- Matt Lauria as Adam Saunders ("Risk")
- Sarah Wynter as Jordan Hester ("Identity Crisis")
- Rhys Coiro as Jordan Hester ("Identity Crisis")
- Seth Gilliam as Detective Desmond Franklin ("Identity Crisis")
- Vincent Curatola as Don Vittorio Zambrano ("Flesh and Blood")
- Pablo Schreiber as Tommy Clay ("Matsya Nyaya")
- Jacob Pitts as Henry Peck ("No Good Deed")
- Carrie Preston as Grace Hendricks ("No Good Deed")
- Jay O. Sanders as Special Counsel ("No Good Deed")
- Amy Acker as Dr. Caroline Turing ("Firewall")
- Austin Pendleton as Pilcher ("Foe")
- Dan Hedaya as Bernie Sullivan ("The Fix")
- Michael Murphy as Congressman Jim Hallen ("Number Crunch")

== Episodes ==
| No. overall | No. in season | Title | Directed by | Written by | Original release date | Prod. code | U.S. viewers (millions) |
|---|---|---|---|---|---|---|---|
| 1 | 1 | "Pilot" | David Semel | Jonathan Nolan | September 22, 2011 | 296807 | 13.33 |
John Reese, a former CIA agent and Army Special Forces soldier now a homeless alcoholic, is arrested for getting into a fight on a New York subway train. He is bailed out before homicide detective Joss Carter can question him regarding DNA evidence linking him to a string of killings. Reese is brought to mysterious billionaire Harold Finch, who explains that after the September 11 attacks, he designed an algorithm capable of predicting crimes by analyzing behavioral patterns in troves of surveillance data. The program ("the Machine") provides the social security number of a person it predicts to be involved in an impending crime, victim or perpetrator. Finch enlists Reese in helping him thwart the crimes, appealing to Reese's sense of guilt following the death of his girlfriend Jessica. Reese's first person of interest, ADA Diane Hansen, oversees a ring of corrupt police officers and plans to kill a fellow DA. He blackmails one of the corrupt officers, detective Lionel Fusco, into being his inside source at the NYPD. Reese then reveals Hansen's corruption to an open court, kills corrupt detective Stills, and links Fusco to the crime to ensure his future cooperation.
| 2 | 2 | "Ghosts" | Richard J. Lewis | Greg Plageman & Jonathan Nolan | September 29, 2011 | 2J6202 | 12.51 |
Reese takes the case of Theresa Whitaker, who supposedly died alongside her family years prior. He discovers that the crime was in fact an assassination staged to look like a murder-suicide, and that there is still a price on Theresa's head. He tracks down the original hitman, who admits he let Theresa live out of a refusal to kill children. Finch locates Theresa, only to be cornered by another hitman; Reese intervenes in time to save them, leaving Theresa in Carter's care. Carter attempts to access Reese's police file via his fingerprints, only to find it redacted. In flashbacks to the early days of the Machine's development, Finch expresses concerns to his since-deceased business partner Nathan Ingram that the Machine would have to be shut down should the public ever learn of its existence.
| 3 | 3 | "Mission Creep" | Steven DePaul | Patrick Harbinson | October 6, 2011 | 2J6203 | 11.57 |
The Machine produces the Social Security number of Joey Durban, a former soldier. On returning from Afghanistan, Joey joined a gang of former soldiers who have taken to robbing banks. Reese infiltrates the gang for their final robbery at an NYPD evidence lockup. They steal a file marked "Elias, M." before Latimer, the ringleader, begin killing off the gang members and escapes. Reese starts tracking him down, but discovers that Latimer has himself been murdered after handing the file over to Elias, his contact. The file is revealed to contain photos from the scene of a brutal murder.
| 4 | 4 | "Cura Te Ipsum" | Charles Beeson | Denise Thé | October 13, 2011 | 2J6204 | 12.04 |
Reese begins 24-hour surveillance of Dr. Megan Tillman, whom he and Finch believe to be targeted by serial rapist Andrew Benton. Reese discovers that Tillman is in fact stalking and planning to kill Benton for raping Tillman's sister, who killed herself after her assault. Tillman abducts Benton, but is talked out of killing him by Reese, who suggests she will not be able to forgive herself for taking a life after spending her career saving them. Reese then kidnaps Benton himself and contemplates killing him to avoid him committing further crimes. Carter finds surveillance footage of Finch and Reese at the robbery from their previous mission. Reese blackmails a police captain into transferring Fusco to Carter's precinct in hopes of sabotaging her investigation into him and Finch.
| 5 | 5 | "Judgment" | Colin Bucksey | David Slack | October 20, 2011 | 2J6205 | 12.42 |
A Polish street gang known as SP-9 kidnaps the son of Samuel Gates, a judge known to be tough on crime. In exchange for his son's safe return, the gang's leader demands that the judge release a banker who is key to their money laundering operation without punishment. Breaking with his preferred means of operation, Reese makes himself known to Gates in an attempt to stall the kidnappers while he uses Fusco to process evidence from the scene of the crime. He misleads SP-9 into believing that their demands have been met, securing the release of Gates' son, before delivering them to Detective Carter and the NYPD. Meanwhile, Reese makes overtures of friendship towards Finch, but is actually trying to find out more about his daily routine.
| 6 | 6 | "The Fix" | Dennis Smith | Nic Van Zeebroeck & Michael Sopczynski | October 27, 2011 | 2J6206 | 11.62 |
Reese takes the case of Zoe Morgan, a professional fixer who uses her high-profile connections to perform various services for her own clients. Zoe is hired to retrieve an incriminating recording of a pharmaceutical executive from a rival company, but comes under threat when she hears the contents of the recording itself and realizes that her employer is just as corrupt as his rival. Finch finds that Zoe's case is connected to that of Dana Miller, a POI whom he was unable to save before meeting Reese. With Zoe's help, Reese exposes the pharmaceutical's corruption and Finch short sells their stock to ensure their downfall, finally getting justice for Miller. Meanwhile, Carter takes a homicide case when the murder weapon is proven to be the same one used in the "Elias, M." case. She learns that the victim was killed with the same knife he used to murder Elias' mother Marlene years prior. Carter finds her friend, retired detective Bernie Sullivan, murdered in his apartment, with the killer fleeing the scene.
| 7 | 7 | "Witness" | Frederick E. O. Toye | Amanda Segel | November 3, 2011 | 2J6207 | 11.76 |
Reese must protect Charlie Burton, a schoolteacher who witnessed a Russian mobster shooting an Italian-American mob lieutenant in a Brighton Beach bodega. As Reese and Burton flee the Russian mob as well as the Five Families of New York's Italian mafia, they stumble into territory controlled by the Bulgarian mob. Meanwhile, Carter searches for Burton to place him in protective police custody, and in doing so, draws closer to finding Carl Elias, believed to be the illegitimate son of an aging mobster with a plan to unite the Five Families and reclaim the New York underworld from the Russians. Cut off from Finch as he tries to evade the Russians and Bulgarians, Reese comes to realize that Burton is Elias. Elias thanks Reese for saving him, but warns him not to interfere with his future goals, leaving Reese feeling guilty for endangering others by saving Elias' life.
| 8 | 8 | "Foe" | Milan Cheylov | Sean Hennen | November 17, 2011 | 2J6208 | 11.65 |
Reese and Finch track former Stasi agent Ulrich Kohl across New York City. Kohl, who recently escaped his 24-year captivity from Germany, is now hunting down his former Stasi colleagues who betrayed him to the American and German governments in exchange for new lives in the U.S., as he believes them to have murdered his wife Anja (who died while attempting to flee Germany with him). Kohl kills one ex-agent, while Reese saves the other from poisoning. Upon confronting his third former colleague, Kohl learns that Anja is alive and staged her own death to leave him, having bore their child Marie in the years since. Kohl locates Anja and takes Marie hostage to force Anja to explain her reasons for leaving him, then forces Reese to kill him. Kohl's situation prompts Reese to reflect on his own past as a spy: flashbacks reveal that "John Reese" is an alias given to him by his former CIA partner Kara Stanton.
| 9 | 9 | "Get Carter" | Alex Zakrzewski | Greg Plageman & Denise Thé | December 8, 2011 | 2J6209 | 12.66 |
In flashbacks, Detective Carter, while serving in the Army, convinces an Iraqi deliveryman to give intelligence on Al-Qaida. Carter is outraged when the American soldiers kill the man during the operation, causing one to warn Carter that she's on her own. In the present, Carter's investigation into the Elias case has earned her a place on Elias' hit list, making her the next POI. Reese faces the challenge of protecting her without revealing his identity. While Carter investigates the murder of a teenager during a drive-by shooting by an arms dealer, Reese continues following Carter, who meets with one of her confidential informants – whom Elias has turned against her. The informant reluctantly shoots Carter twice in the chest, but she is protected by a bulletproof vest; Reese kills the informant before he can finish the job. Reese parts ways with Carter accepting that she will still have to arrest him given the next chance, but promising that she is not alone. Reese threatens an HR higher-up in order to force him to get the hit called off.
| 10 | 10 | "Number Crunch" | Jeffrey Hunt | Patrick Harbinson | December 15, 2011 | 2J6210 | 12.93 |
The Machine produces four POIs: Reese finds one dead and fails to prevent the murder of the second. He learns that all four individuals were involved in robbing drug money from the scene of a car crash, and are now being targeted by the corrupt banker and Congressman implicated in the accident. Carter is approached by CIA operative Mark Snow, who requests her help in locating Reese; Snow explains that Reese was responsible for the death of his CIA partner Kara Stanton years ago, and disappeared thereafter until Carter's investigation put him back on the agency's radar. Reese is approached by Carter and Snow soon after he saves the remaining two POIs from being assassinated. While fleeing, he is shot by a CIA assassin and retrieved by Finch; Carter catches up with them, but allows them to escape.
| 11 | 11 | "Super" | Stephen Williams | David Slack | January 12, 2012 | 2J6211 | 14.86 |
Finch takes a wounded Reese to the morgue and pays an assistant to suture Reese's wounds while sending Fusco to misdirect the CIA. While Reese is in a wheelchair, Finch rents an apartment for him. The building's super, Ernest Trask, is the newest number; Reese and Finch believe him to stalking one of his tenants, Lily Thornton, and targeting her boyfriend Rick. However, Trask reveals that Rick is the one stalking Lily and he is only trying to protect her. Reese rushes to Lily's apartment to save her from Rick and ends up throwing him out of a window during the confrontation, leaving Rick severely injured. Finch later discovers that Trask's wild claims about his previous life are actually true and he is in the Witness Protection Program. Having recognized him from the evidence lockup robbery, Carter attempts to contact Finch, who gives her information that helps her stop a homicide; Finch later calls and explains that his purpose is to prevent crimes. In flashbacks, Finch and Ingram come at odds with the NSA, whose employee Denton Weeks is attempting to seize control of the Machine over concerns regarding its constitutionality.
| 12 | 12 | "Legacy" | Brad Anderson | Amanda Segel | January 19, 2012 | 2J6212 | 14.40 |
Reese decides to finally meet Carter, who helps Finch and him in their next case to glean insight into their methods. Their POI, Andrea Gutierrez, is a self-made attorney who specializes in suing the state of New York on behalf of convicts who believe they were wrongfully imprisoned. They learn that the parole officer of Andrea's latest client is setting up convicts for imprisonment and profiting off of placing their children in foster care, and manage to save Andrea's life. Reese follows Finch to a meeting with Ingram's son Will, who inquires about his father's death and the nature of his work with Finch.
| 13 | 13 | "Root Cause" | Richard J. Lewis | Erik Mountain | February 2, 2012 | 2J6213 | 15.10 |
Reese and Finch take the case of construction manager Scott Powell, who was laid off due to budget cuts advanced by Congressman Michael Delancey, whom Powell is planning to assassinate in revenge. However, as Reese tries to intercept Powell, Finch realizes that he has been framed, and he and Reese are unable to stop the real assassin from killing Delancey. Powell is arrested by the FBI in the face of mounting evidence. Reese helps him escape and enlists Zoe Morgan's help in identifying Delancey's chief of staff Matheson as the real culprit, having hired both an assassin and a hacker to kill Delancey and frame Powell to cover up his own corruption. Finch exonerates Powell after acquiring an incriminating recording between Matheson and the hacker. Matheson is later found dead; the hacker, who goes by alias "Root", admits to having him killed to tie up loose ends, and acknowledges Finch, by name, as a worthy adversary.
| 14 | 14 | "Wolf and Cub" | Chris Fisher | Nic Van Zeebroeck & Michael Sopczynski | February 9, 2012 | 2J6214 | 15.14 |
The latest POI, teenager Darren McGrady, is attempting to avenge the death of his older brother Travis at the hands of a drug gang. Reese stops him from killing the gang's leader and later tracks down both the murder weapon and the perpetrators, who are arrested while Darren is taken to a new foster home. Finch is visited by Will Ingram, who found a reference to the Machine in his father's belongings; Finch later observes Will as he meets ex NSA employee Alicia Corwin, who flees when Will mentions his father's best friend. Reese has Fusco investigate Finch and learns he went to MIT; the Machine deems Reese and Fusco potential threats and begins monitoring them.
| 15 | 15 | "Blue Code" | David Von Ancken | Denise Thé | February 16, 2012 | 2J6215 | 13.16 |
Reese and Finch discover their latest POI, Michael Cahill, to be secretly involved in a ruthless smuggling ring led by a man named Vargas. Reese infiltrates the ring and learns that Cahill is in fact an undercover cop formerly named Daniel Tully, and has held off on arresting Vargas in hopes of apprehending his superior. Reese learns that Vargas may have a connection inside the NYPD; Fusco attempts to locate the connection via his friend, corrupt police officer Patrick Simmons, but is later taken hostage by Vargas' corrupt informant, whom Reese kills in time. Reese tasks Fusco with going undercover in "HR" – a secretive network of corrupt NYPD officers – to learn more about their operations. Flashbacks show Reese and Kara in New York, illegally operating on U.S. soil. Reese meets his girlfriend Jessica's husband Peter Arndt at a bar, but leaves before Arndt can "introduce" him to Jessica.
| 16 | 16 | "Risk" | Jeff T. Thomas | Sean Hennen | February 23, 2012 | 2J6216 | 14.56 |
Reese goes undercover as Finch's asset manager at a Wall Street investment firm to monitor their latest number, trader Adam Saunders. Adam had advised his adoptive uncle to invest heavily in a firm known as Tritak, but has since noticed suspicious activity, putting his life in danger. Reese learns that Adam's co-worker, along with an SEC employee monitoring him, are engaged in insider trading, hoping to short the soon-to-fail Tritak and defraud thousands of people out of millions of dollars. Reese saves Adam from being assassinated while Finch uses his unlimited funds to keep Tritak financially afloat. Carter deduces that the true mastermind behind the plot is Carl Elias while Reese gains possession of a burner phone that he can use to contact Elias in the future.
| 17 | 17 | "Baby Blue" | Larry Teng | Patrick Harbinson | March 8, 2012 | 2J6217 | 15.67 |
Carter places crime lord Don Gianni Moretti in witness protection ahead of his anticipated testimony against Elias. Reese and Finch are surprised when the Machine names a six-month old child, Leila Smith, as the latest POI. They learn that Leila is the illegitimate child of a construction magnate whose wife ordered the hit to protect the family's reputation and is now unable to call off the contract. Leila is kidnapped; a desperate Reese goes to Elias for help. Elias helps Reese to retrieve Leila but then traps them both in a refrigerated truck until Reese gives up Moretti's location. Elias kidnaps Moretti, who is revealed to be his father. In the process, Carter's friend Bill Szymanski is seriously wounded and Carter distances herself from Reese and Finch.
| 18 | 18 | "Identity Crisis" | Charles Beeson | Amy Berg | March 29, 2012 | 2J6218 | 14.59 |
Reese and Finch are given the number of Jordan Hester, whose identity matches both a male and a female individual. Finch believes the female Hester to be in danger, but learns that she is an identity thief named Mary, while the real Hester is the man. Mary drugs Finch and leaves him to die in a fire, but Fusco rescues him. Mary goes to kill Hester, but Reese gets her arrested, exposing her real identity as con artist Tara Verlander. Carter, keeping her distance from Reese and Finch, is approached by FBI agent Donnelly, who is also pursuing Reese. Donnelly explains that Reese was illegally involved in CIA operations on U.S. soil, and the FBI believe him to be working for Elias.
| 19 | 19 | "Flesh and Blood" | Stephen Semel | Amanda Segel | April 5, 2012 | 2J6219 | 13.69 |
The Machine yields five numbers belonging to the respective heads of New York's major Italian crime families. Reese and Finch suspect Elias is planning to eliminate his competition, and Carter has the dons placed in protective custody. One of the dons is killed in a car explosion while another is killed in witness protection. Carter takes the remaining dons to a safe house, but is tracked down by HR cops. Elias has Carter's son kidnapped to force her to turn the dons over to him; Reese rescues Carter's son alongside Elias' father Gianni Moretti, against whom Elias wants revenge for ordering the murder of his mother Marlene. HR cuts ties with Elias after Finch shows Simmons that Elias is targeting his and other corrupt officers' families. After Fusco calls for backup from honest cops, Elias surrenders to Carter and is finally arrested for his crimes. On his way to his prison cell, Elias places a call to his father and half-brother before having the two killed in a car bomb executed by his lieutenant Scarface.
| 20 | 20 | "Matsya Nyaya" | Kevin Bray | Ray Utarnachitt | April 26, 2012 | 2J6220 | 12.73 |
The latest POI, armored-car driver Tommy Clay, is working with a team Finch believes will be robbed. Reese infiltrates the team, but the vehicle explodes during a platinum robbery and Clay shoots Reese, who is rescued by Carter and hospitalized. Finch tracks Clay to a motel where his two partners have been killed, while Fusco realizes HR is connected to the robbery. Finch tracks down Clay's girlfriend Ashley, a waitress, but she kills Clay and attempts to escape with the platinum before being killed by Captain Lynch of HR who is in turn killed by Fusco to save Reese. In flashbacks, Reese receives a panicked phone call from his girlfriend Jessica before traveling with Kara to Ordos, China, to retrieve a stolen computer. Snow separately orders Kara and Reese to kill the other. In Ordos, Reese realizes the CIA wants the computer destroyed and anyone who had access to it killed, right as a CIA missile destroys the site, seemingly killing Kara. Kara is later revealed to be alive in the present day when she kidnaps Snow and kills his partner.
| 21 | 21 | "Many Happy Returns" | Frederick E. O. Toye | Story by : Erik Mountain & Jonathan Nolan; Teleplay by : Erik Mountain | May 3, 2012 | 2J6221 | 13.27 |
Flashbacks reveal that Reese's girlfriend Jessica was killed by her abusive husband Peter Arndt, who covered up the death as a car crash. Finch spots Reese in the hospital as the latter learns of Jessica's death, suggesting she was a POI Finch was unable to save. Reese later finds evidence of Arndt's abuse and apparently kills him in his home. In the present, Reese is given the day off, ostensibly for his birthday. Finch urges Carter to accompany agent Donnelly to New Rochelle, where Donnelly suspects Reese in Arndt's disappearance. Finch and Fusco track POI Karen Garner, who is being pursued by U.S. Marshals for identity theft, but realize she is fleeing her abusive husband Brad, a marshal who framed her to trigger a manhunt. Reese realizes Finch kept him away from the case to protect him from the reminder of Jessica's death, and manages to find and subdue Brad as he attempts to kidnap his wife. Reese makes Brad disappear by arranging for him to be imprisoned in a Mexican penitentiary for drug smuggling. It is implied that Reese has done the same thing several times before as a way of making people disappear without actually killing them, possibly including to Arndt. During these events, Carter finds out Reese's true identity through his military record, but decides to keep it a secret; Finch gifts Reese his own apartment.
| 22 | 22 | "No Good Deed" | Stephen Williams | David Slack | May 10, 2012 | 2J6222 | 12.96 |
Flashbacks to 2009 show Alicia Corwin warning Ingram that the Machine will "flag" anyone who discovers its existence, leading Ingram to realize the government will use the Machine to spy on its own citizens. He asks Finch to create a contingency to avoid such an abuse of power; when Finch refuses, Ingram creates one himself. In the present, NSA security analyst Henry Peck, the latest POI, is being targeted for unwittingly discovering the Machine's existence in a security report. Though Peck is initially incredulous, he realizes the Machine does indeed exist after being repeatedly saved by Reese, and decides to contact the press. Finch intercepts Peck and gives him a new identity while admitting to creating the Machine, unaware that Corwin is listening in. Reese tracks down Finch's fiancée Grace, who believes him dead; Finch admits he faked his death to protect her.
| 23 | 23 | "Firewall" | Richard J. Lewis | Greg Plageman & Jonathan Nolan | May 17, 2012 | 2J6223 | 13.47 |
Fusco is hired by HR leadership to obstruct any investigation into a planned murder, with the target being the latest POI: Dr. Caroline Turing, a therapist with a powerful client list. Reese poses as one of her clients and saves her from an assassination attempt. HR and FBI later converge on the hotel where Reese is hiding Turing; Carter and Fusco help them escape and fend off HR – discovering in the process that they are on the same side – while Finch waits in a car to collect Turing. However, he is met by Corwin, who demands his help in shutting down the Machine. Corwin is suddenly shot dead by Turing, who reveals herself as "Root," the mysterious hacker Finch previously encountered. Root anonymously hired HR to target her, thereby putting her on the Machine's radar and allowing her to learn more about it. She abducts Finch before Reese can arrive. Fusco sends evidence to the FBI allowing them to arrest an HR mole and exposing HR's Inner Council, the first step towards bringing the organization down. Reese asks the Machine via a surveillance camera to help him find Finch. A payphone rings nearby and Reese answers.

== Development ==
=== Production ===
The project started in September 2010 when NBC ordered a put pilot for a series called Odd Jobs after winning a bidding war with ABC. The project had Josh Appelbaum and André Nemec as writers, J. J. Abrams and Bryan Burk as executive producer through their production company Bad Robot and would star Michael Emerson and Terry O'Quinn, both previously worked with Abrams and Burk on Lost. Around this time, Jonathan Nolan was also working on an undisclosed series for CBS with Bad Robot serving as executive producer. In January 2011, NBC announced that Odd Jobs would roll on the next season after delays in the production of the series.

In February 2011, CBS picked up Nolan's series, now titled Person of Interest, ordering a pilot order. A few days later, David Semel was announced to direct the pilot for the series. In April 2011, Greg Plageman joined the series as executive producer and would also serve as showrunner. By May 2011, Deadline Hollywood reported that the pilot was "gaining momentum" compared to other drama series on CBS. A week later, the site reported that it was in a "frontrunner status" to be picked up. On May 13, 2011, CBS officially picked up the pilot to series, ordering a 13-episode season.

=== Casting ===
Michael Emerson was the first actor to join the series in February 2011, starring as a "mysterious billionaire who hires a special ops agent". Emerson dropped out of Odd Jobs and was also offered a role in Once Upon a Time. Emerson took the role to avoid being "typecast" as his previous role on Lost as Ben Linus. In March 2011, Jim Caviezel and Taraji P. Henson joined as series regulars, with Caviezel playing the lead character, John Reese, while Henson was set to play a homicide detective Joss Carter. Caviezel took the role as his character was "searching for a purpose. I think, like it hit me, it's going to hit other people there's something besides all the technology in the story." By April 2011, Kevin Chapman also joined the series.

== Release ==
=== Broadcast ===
On May 18, 2011, CBS announced that the series would take over the Thursday at 9:00 p.m. slot on the 2011–12 fall schedule, replacing CSI: Crime Scene Investigation, which had the slot since 2001. The decision to take over CSI: Crime Scene Investigation's time slot was questioned by many industry analysts. Kelly Kahl, CBS Vice President, Scheduling, said, "To do that you have to have the big guns, and we do. Now we have stability at 8 and 10 PM and a great upside in the middle." The season ended on May 17, 2012.

=== Home media release ===
The first season was released on Blu-ray and DVD in region 1 on September 4, 2012, in region 2 on March 18, 2013, and in region 4 on November 7, 2012.

In 2014, Warner Bros. Television Studios announced that it sold the off-network SVOD of the series to Netflix. On September 1, 2015, the season became available to stream on Netflix. On September 22, 2020, the series left the service and was added to HBO Max on January 23, 2021.

== Reception ==
=== Ratings ===
According to CBS, Person of Interest received the highest test ratings of any drama pilot in 15 years, what one CBS executive called "crazy broad appeal you don't usually see", prompting CBS to move CSI, which was broadcast on Thursday for over 10 years, to Wednesday, opening up a slot for Person of Interest. The pilot episode won its time slot, drawing 13.2 million viewers.

Viewership and ratings per episode of Person of Interest season 1
| No. | Title | Air date | Rating/share (18–49) | Viewers (millions) | DVR (18–49) | DVR viewers (millions) | Total (18–49) | Total viewers (millions) |
|---|---|---|---|---|---|---|---|---|
| 1 | "Pilot" | September 22, 2011 | 3.1/8 | 13.33 | 0.9 | 2.75 | 4.0 | 16.08 |
| 2 | "Ghosts" | September 29, 2011 | 2.7/7 | 12.51 | 0.8 | 2.56 | 3.5 | 15.08 |
| 3 | "Mission Creep" | October 6, 2011 | 2.6/6 | 11.57 | 0.8 | 2.64 | 3.4 | 14.21 |
| 4 | "Cura Te Ipsum" | October 13, 2011 | 2.8/7 | 12.04 | 0.8 | 2.47 | 3.6 | 14.51 |
| 5 | "Judgment" | October 20, 2011 | 2.7/7 | 12.42 | 0.9 | 2.64 | 3.6 | 15.06 |
| 6 | "The Fix" | October 27, 2011 | 2.7/6 | 11.62 | 0.9 | 2.48 | 3.6 | 14.10 |
| 7 | "Witness" | November 3, 2011 | 2.7/7 | 11.76 | 0.9 | 2.83 | 3.6 | 14.59 |
| 8 | "Foe" | November 17, 2011 | 2.6/7 | 11.65 | 1.0 | 2.96 | 3.6 | 14.61 |
| 9 | "Get Carter" | December 8, 2011 | 2.8/7 | 12.66 | 1.1 | 3.22 | 3.9 | 15.88 |
| 10 | "Number Crunch" | December 15, 2011 | 2.8/8 | 12.93 | 1.0 | 2.91 | 3.8 | 15.84 |
| 11 | "Super" | January 12, 2012 | 3.2/8 | 14.86 | 1.1 | 3.12 | 4.3 | 17.98 |
| 12 | "Legacy" | January 19, 2012 | 3.2/8 | 14.40 | 1.0 | 3.26 | 4.3 | 17.75 |
| 13 | "Root Cause" | February 2, 2012 | 3.3/9 | 15.10 | 1.2 | 3.21 | 4.5 | 18.31 |
| 14 | "Wolf and Cub" | February 9, 2012 | 3.3/8 | 15.14 | 1.1 | 3.28 | 4.4 | 18.42 |
| 15 | "Blue Code" | February 16, 2012 | 2.8/7 | 13.16 | 1.2 | 3.55 | 4.0 | 16.71 |
| 16 | "Risk" | February 23, 2012 | 3.1/8 | 14.56 | 1.1 | 3.19 | 4.2 | 17.74 |
| 17 | "Baby Blue" | March 8, 2012 | 3.4/9 | 15.67 | 1.0 | 3.05 | 4.4 | 18.87 |
| 18 | "Identity Crisis" | March 29, 2012 | 3.3/9 | 14.59 | 1.1 | 3.19 | 4.4 | 17.78 |
| 19 | "Flesh and Blood" | April 5, 2012 | 3.0/8 | 13.69 | 0.9 | 2.80 | 3.9 | 16.49 |
| 20 | "Matsya Nyaya" | April 26, 2012 | 2.4/6 | 12.73 | 1.0 | 3.13 | 3.4 | 15.85 |
| 21 | "Many Happy Returns" | May 3, 2012 | 2.5/7 | 13.27 | 1.0 | 3.10 | 3.5 | 16.37 |
| 22 | "No Good Deed" | May 10, 2012 | 2.6/7 | 12.96 | 1.0 | 2.87 | 3.6 | 15.83 |
| 23 | "Firewall" | May 17, 2012 | 2.5/7 | 13.47 | 1.0 | 2.79 | 3.5 | 16.26 |

=== Critical reception ===
The first season of Person of Interest received generally positive reviews, with the pilot episode drawing a favorable response from critics and later episodes receiving higher praise. On Rotten Tomatoes, the season has an approval rating of 63% and average rating of 6.7 out of 10 based on 38 reviews. The site's critical consensus is, "Person of Interest is a well made and well acted espionage procedural, though its characters aren't terribly well developed and its intriguing premise yields mixed results." On Metacritic, the season scored 66 out of 100 based on 26 reviews.

Of the pilot, David Wiegand of the San Francisco Chronicle said "Person of Interest separates itself from the gimmick pack, not only because of superbly nuanced characterization and writing but also because of how it engages a post-9/11 sense of paranoia in its viewers." David Hinckley of the New York Daily News gave the pilot four stars out of five, commenting on Caviezel's and Emerson's performances, saying Caviezel "brings the right stuff to this role" and Emerson "is fascinating as Mr. Finch." Mary McNamara of the Los Angeles Times stated that in regard to the pilot, "the notion of preventing crimes rather than solving them is an appealing twist... The surveillance graphics are very cool." The episodes "Many Happy Returns" and the finale "Firewall" were particularly acclaimed. Tim Surette of TV.com called the former one of the series' "best episodes", commending Caviezel's performance and the episode's character exploration, while the latter was called "exactly what a season finale should be", with Surette concluding his review by saying "'Firewall' was a spectacular finish to what has been an incredibly surprising first season of Person of Interest."

=== Accolades ===
| Year | Association | Category | Nominee(s) / episode | Result | Ref. |
|---|---|---|---|---|---|
| 2012 | Golden Reel Awards | Best Sound Editing – Short Form Dialogue and ADR in Television | Thomas DeGorter, H. Jay Levine, Maciek Malish, Matt Sawelson / "Witness" | Nominated | |
| 2012 | Hollywood Post Alliance | Outstanding Sound – Television | Thomas DeGorter, Keith Rogers, Matt Sawelson, Scott Weber / "Matsya Nyaya" | Nominated | |
| 2012 | IGN | Best TV Action Series | Person of Interest | Nominated | |
| 2012 | NAACP Image Awards | Outstanding Actress in a Drama Series | Taraji P. Henson | Nominated | |
| 2012 | People's Choice Awards | Favorite New TV Drama | Person of Interest | Won | |
| 2012 | Primetime Creative Arts Emmy Awards | Outstanding Sound Mixing for a Comedy or Drama Series (One Hour) | Noah Timan, Keith Rogers, Frank Morrone, Scott Weber / "Pilot" | Nominated | |
