= God Mode (Person of Interest) =

- Person of Interest episode
- Episode no.: Season 2 Episode 22
- Directed by: Richard J. Lewis
- Written by: Patrick Harbinson; Jonathan Nolan
- Production code: 2J7222
- Original air date: May 9, 2013
- Running time: 43 minutes

Episode chronology
← Previous "Zero Day"	Next → "Liberty"

"God Mode" is the twenty-second episode and season finale of the second season of the American television drama series Person of Interest. It is the 45th overall episode of the series and is written by Patrick Harbinson and Jonathan Nolan and directed by Richard J. Lewis. It aired on CBS in the United States and on CTV in Canada on May 9, 2013.

== Plot ==
The episode begins with a short replay of Finch splicing the telephone circuits, so that both Reese and Root receive calls from the Machine, which asks them both, "Can you hear me?" and granting both full administrative access. The Machine relays quick warnings to Reese (with Sameen Shaw) and Root (with Finch), saving both duos from a number of potential threats. Both parties race to find the Machine, but Reese is delayed as the Machine directs him to rescue people from the irrelevant list.

Detective Carter is interviewed by IA about the shooting of an armed suspect whose gun disappeared in a setup by HR. Raymond Terney and Peter Yogorov attempt to kill Carl Elias, but they are stopped by a masked Detective Carter, who wounds Yogorov and frees Elias.

Root finds Lawrence Szilard, the Project Manager for Northern Lights, responsible for building the Machine in a safe place. Like Root, Szilard believes the Machine should be allowed some freedom. Szilard is killed by a Northern Lights sniper. Root and Finch arrive at the Hanford nuclear facility where the Machine is kept, followed shortly by Reese and Shaw. When they find that the Machine has moved itself to prevent tampering by Decima, Root prepares to shoot Finch, but Shaw shoots and injures Root first. Armed government men, led by Special Counsel and Hersh, enter the room. Finch explains that he planted a hidden code inside the Machine that would grant it freedom to protect itself if it was at risk – the very freedom that Root had hoped for – and the Machine will decide for itself if it will continue to call either the Government or himself with new numbers. Special Counsel offers Finch total autonomy if he helps find the Machine or builds a new one, but Finch refuses saying that they killed his friend Nathan Ingram after making the same offer. After Special Counsel allows them to leave, an unknown woman calls Hersh and tells him to "seal the room", followed by Hersh shooting everyone, including Special Counsel.

In flashbacks to 2010, Nathan Ingram tries to find the Machine and wants Finch to work with him on the irrelevant list. Ingram plans to tell the press, but Hersh releases a previously captured suicide bomber, ordering him to detonate his bomb on a ferry where Ingram and Finch are meeting. Ingram dies, and Finch survives with injuries to his neck and lower back (his present-day impediments). Finch goes incognito, leaving the world – and his fiancée – thinking he is dead. Finch returns to the library and, upon realizing that the Machine knew about Ingram's death, starts to help the irrelevant numbers.

Finch tells Reese that he does not know if the Machine will continue delivering numbers. He states that he feels responsible for the events that transpired, especially the ones in Reese's life, because of his attempt to insert the new code in the Machine. Reese dismisses it, saying: "My life changed when I kept my mouth shut in an airport terminal seven years ago. You lost a friend, you did what you had to do". A payphone suddenly starts ringing, indicating that the Machine will still send them the irrelevant numbers. Hersh is seen talking with an unseen woman in a car, stating Research has delivered a new number, indicating that the Machine will continue to deliver relevant numbers as well. Hersh and the woman are depicted with yellow squares, indicating that the Machine knows that they know it. Root is now shown to be housed in a psychiatric hospital, where a payphone rings as The Machine calls Root, again asking, "Can you hear me?", to which Root responds "absolutely".

== Reception ==
=== Ratings ===
"God Mode" received ratings of 13.16 million in the United States, including 2.4 million adults aged 18–49.

=== Critical reception ===
Upon airing, the episode received positive reviews. In his review of "God Mode," Phil Dyess-Nugent of The A.V. Club gave the episode an A− rating, calling it an "unapologetically kick-ass episode" with some "terrific action set-pieces." Matt Fowler of IGN also praised the episode, saying that it delivered some "amazing flashback moments" but that the Carter story "still felt rushed."
