= Person of Interest (TV series) =

2011 American science fiction crime drama television series

- Genre: Action; Crime drama; Science fiction
- Created by: Jonathan Nolan
- Starring: Jim Caviezel; Taraji P. Henson; Kevin Chapman; Michael Emerson; Amy Acker; Sarah Shahi
- Composer: Ramin Djawadi
- Country of origin: United States
- Original language: English
- No. of seasons: 5
- No. of episodes: 103 (list of episodes)

Production
- Executive producers: Jonathan Nolan; Greg Plageman; J. J. Abrams; Bryan Burk; Denise Thé; Chris Fisher
- Producers: Athena Wickham; Margot Lulick; Kathy Lingg; Stephen Semel; Erik Mountain
- Production location: New York City, New York
- Cinematography: Gonzalo Amat; Stephen McNutt; Manuel Billeter; Teodoro Maniaci; David Insley
- Editors: Scott Lerner; Scott Powell; Ryan Malanaphy; Ray Daniels III; Mark Conte
- Running time: 43 minutes
- Production companies: Kilter Films; Bad Robot; Bonanza Productions; Warner Bros. Television

Original release
- Network: CBS
- Release: September 22, 2011 – June 21, 2016

Person of Interest is an American science fiction crime drama television series that aired on CBS from September 22, 2011, to June 21, 2016, with its five seasons consisting of 103 episodes. The series was created by Jonathan Nolan; executive producers were Nolan, J. J. Abrams, Bryan Burk, Greg Plageman, Denise Thé, and Chris Fisher.

The series centers on a mysterious reclusive billionaire computer programmer, Harold Finch (Michael Emerson), who has developed a computer program for the federal government known as "the Machine" that is capable of collating all sources of information to predict terrorist acts and to identify people planning them. Finch hires John Reese (Jim Caviezel), a former special forces soldier and CIA operative, to be his field agent in preventing everyday murders (deemed "irrelevant" in terms of national security). The series raises an array of moral issues, from questions of privacy and "the greater good", the concept of justifiable homicide, and problems caused by working with limited information programs.

Person of Interest was acclaimed during its run and considered by several critics to be the best science fiction show on broadcast TV. Katharine Trendacosta of Gizmodo noted that by the end of the series in 2016, Person of Interest had been transformed from a "crime-fighting show" with an entertaining plot device into "one of the best science-fiction series ever broadcast". The show won the 2012 People's Choice Award for Favorite New TV Drama and the 2016 People's Choice Award for Favorite TV Crime Drama.

== Plot ==
John Reese, a former Special Forces soldier and CIA operative, is burnt out and presumed dead, living as a vagrant in New York City. He is approached by Harold Finch, a reclusive billionaire software genius who built a computer system for the US government after the September 11 attacks, called the "Machine", which monitors all electronic communications and surveillance video feeds in order to predict future terrorist activities. Finch and Reese attempt to understand the threat to, or by, people the Machine identifies as being "of interest" by providing only their social security numbers, and try to stop the crime from occurring. They are helped by New York Police Department Detective Lionel Fusco, a formerly corrupt officer whom Reese coerces into helping them, and Detective Joss Carter, an ex–US Army lieutenant and former senior military interrogator in the 4th Infantry Division who initially investigates Reese for his vigilante activities.

During the second season, Decima Technologies, a powerful and secretive private intelligence firm run by ex–British Army officer turned MI6 spy John Greer, is revealed to be attempting to gain access to the Machine. Detective Carter vows vengeance against HR, a criminal organization of corrupt law enforcement officers and public officials in the city, after they have her boyfriend, Detective Cal Beecher, murdered. Reese and Finch encounter Sameen Shaw, an ex–United States Marine and a US Army ISA assassin, on the run after being betrayed by her employers. The Machine is revealed to have developed sentience and covertly arranged for itself to be moved to an undisclosed location to protect itself from interference.

In the third season, the Machine's sentience is fully revealed as it increasingly communicates with and proactively assists and directs the actions of the team. After being demoted due to HR's machinations, Carter brings down the entire organization by uncovering and arresting its leader, but is killed by its rogue second-in-command. The team also battles Vigilance, a violent anti-government organization devoted to securing people's privacy. A second advanced artificial intelligence called Samaritan is revealed. Samaritan differs from the Machine in being open to external direction and willing to remove those seen as disruptive to law and order pre-emptively.

The fourth season covers the team's life in hiding. They continue to work on cases, but must now also evade Samaritan, which is seeking to resolve perceived problems of human violence by reshaping society, sometimes violently. Samaritan and the Machine meet via human proxies as the only two of their kind, and discuss their essential differences, disagreeing strongly on whether free will or firm guidance is more beneficial to humanity. They part with the understanding that Samaritan will seek to destroy the Machine.

In season five, Finch steals and weaponizes Ice-9, a computer virus capable of infecting and destroying Samaritan, although it will also destroy the Machine and much of the global computing infrastructure as well. Greer sacrifices himself in vain to kill Finch and ensure Samaritan's continuation. The Machine ceases to function after showing Finch its prediction of the world and his friends' futures if it had not existed. Reese sacrifices himself to ensure that Ice-9 destroys Samaritan, while Finch survives and reunites with his former fiancée. A while later, Shaw is unexpectedly contacted by the Machine; it has restored itself from a satellite to continue its work.

== Cast and characters ==
=== Main ===
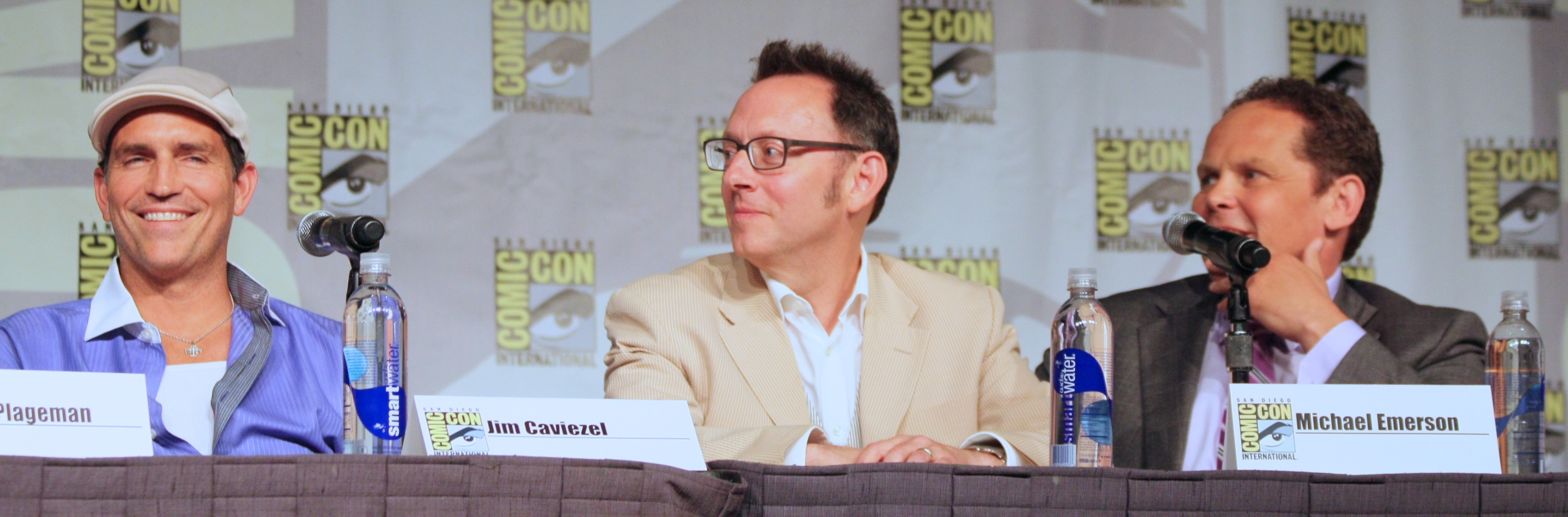
Left to right: Jim Caviezel (Reese), Michael Emerson (Finch), and Kevin Chapman (Fusco)

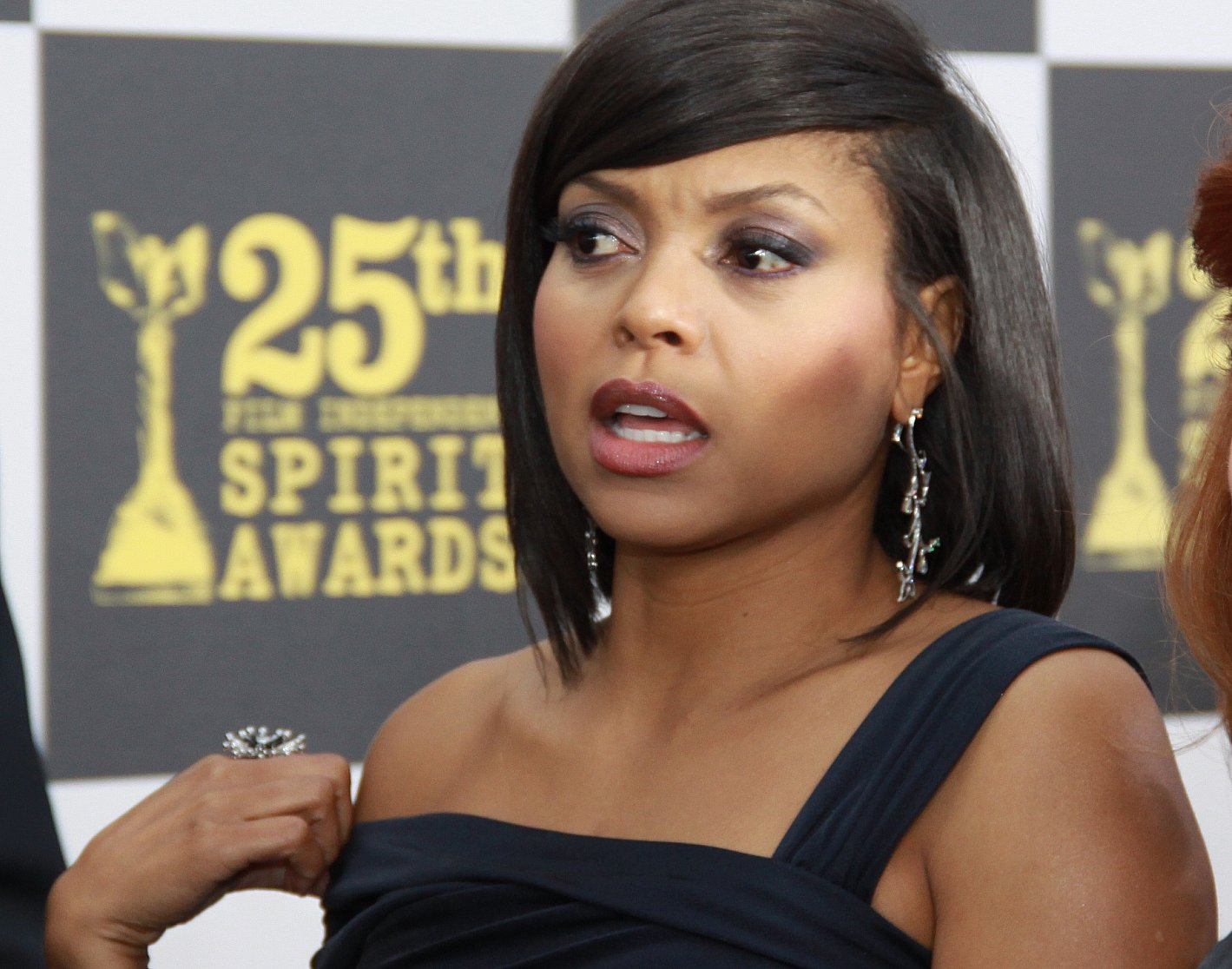
Taraji P. Henson (Carter)

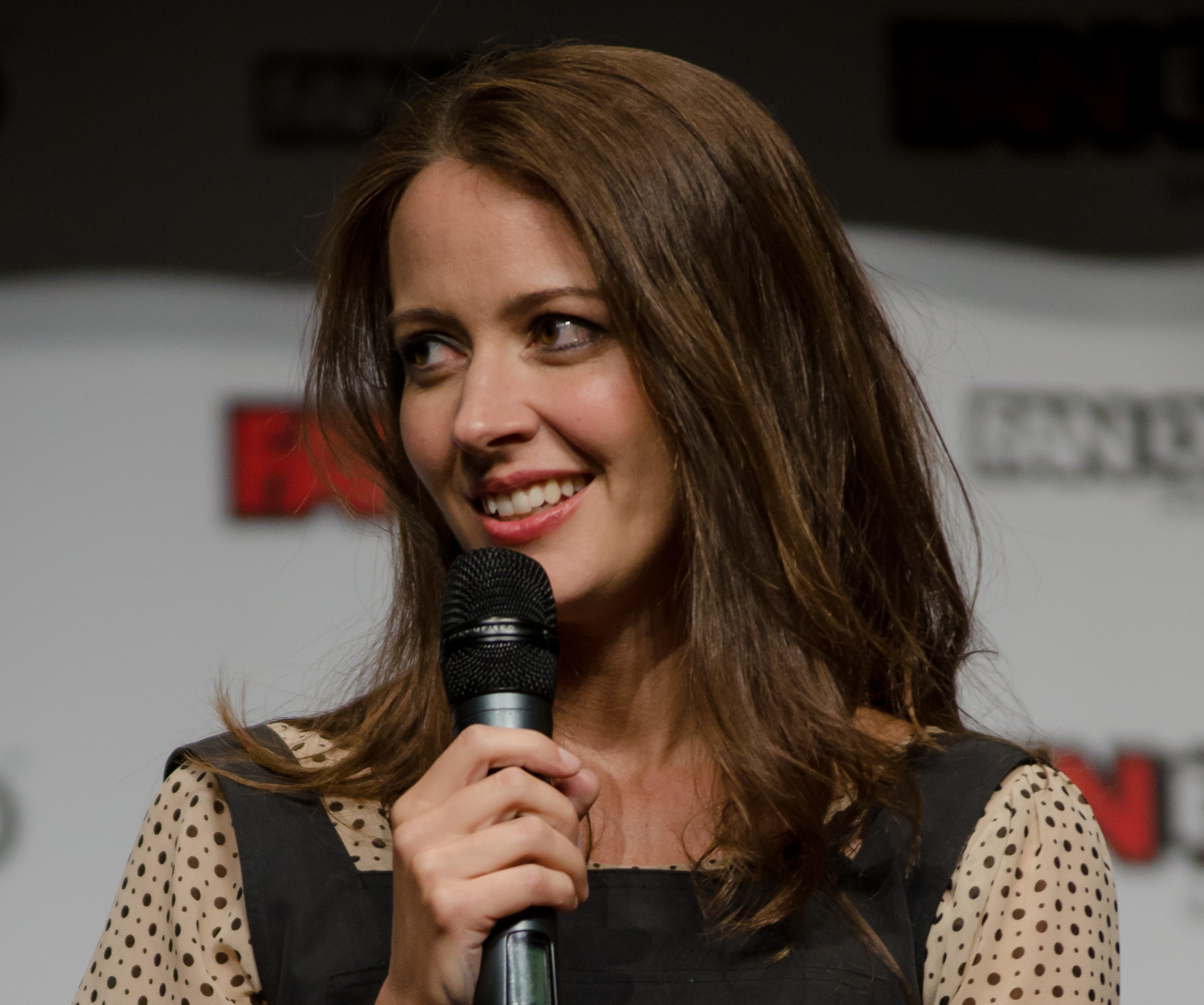
Amy Acker (Root)

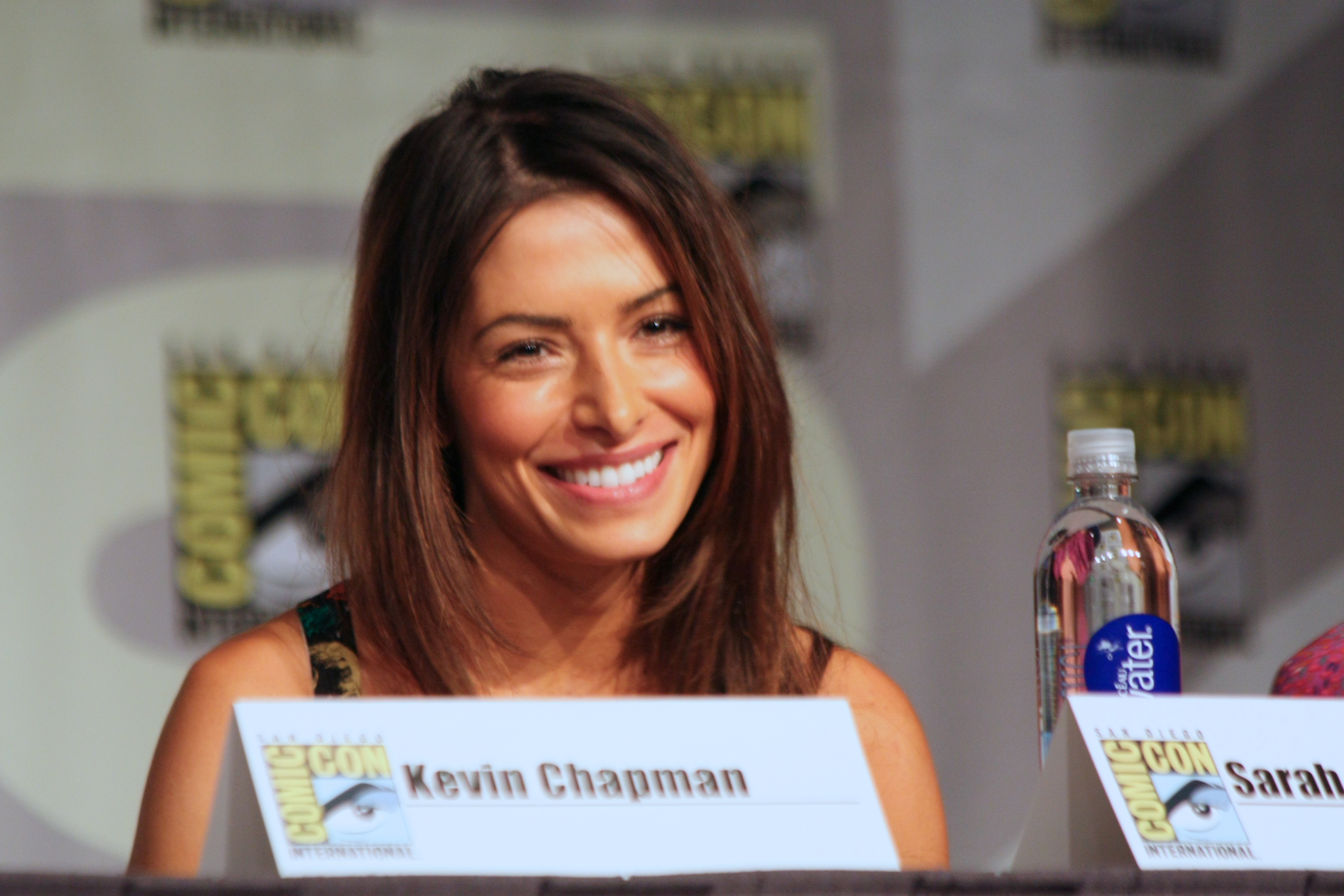
Sarah Shahi (Shaw)

- Jim Caviezel as John Reese: a former United States Army Special Forces soldier and later a CIA operative in the Special Activities Division
- Taraji P. Henson as Joss Carter (seasons 1–3; guest season 4): a New York Police Department detective stationed at the NYPD's 8th Precinct and a member of the NYPD's Homicide Task Force. Carter is a former US Army lieutenant and interrogation officer who served in the 4th Infantry Division and passed the bar exam in 2004, but gave up practicing law to return to police work.
- Kevin Chapman as Lionel Fusco: a reformed corrupt NYPD detective whom Reese blackmails into being a source inside the NYPD and later arranges for him to be transferred into Carter's 8th Precinct and reassigned to the Homicide Task Force so that the two end up working together.
- Michael Emerson as Harold Finch: a reclusive, security-conscious, and intensely private billionaire software engineer. His real name is unknown and he has many aliases (most commonly Harold Wren), using various species of birds as the surname.
- Amy Acker as Root a.k.a. Samantha Groves (seasons 3–5; guest season 1; recurring season 2): a genius hacker obsessed with the Machine. She later becomes the only person able to communicate directly with the Machine, when it chooses her as its "analog interface".
- Sarah Shahi as Sameen Shaw (seasons 3–5; recurring season 2): a former United States Marine and later a US Army ISA operative and assassin who was working for Northern Lights, where she unknowingly dealt with the "relevant" numbers generated by the Machine

=== Recurring ===
- Brett Cullen as Nathan Ingram, Finch's collaborator on the Machine who died in a suicide bombing attack set up by the government. Ingram acted as the interface between the government and his company while the Machine was under development. Finch and Ingram became best friends while they both attended the Massachusetts Institute of Technology.
- Carrie Preston as Grace Hendricks, Finch's fiancée who believes him to be dead following the ferry bombing that killed Ingram
- Paige Turco as Zoe Morgan, a "fixer" who specializes in crisis management. Finch and Reese first meet her as a person of interest. Later, she works with them on cases that require her skills. She and Reese have an apparently sporadic romantic relationship.
- Ken Leung as Leon Tao, a former financial criminal and three-time person of interest who has assisted in some cases with his forensic accounting skills. He has a penchant for get-rich-schemes which always land him in difficulties with gangsters.
- Brennan Brown as Nicholas Donnelly, an FBI special agent who becomes interested in Reese when his case crosses one of Reese's. He periodically offers Carter the opportunity to work with him as he pursues Reese.
- Luke Kleintank as Caleb Phipps, a genius teenager with a difficult past. Phipps later returns as a successful computer coder.
- Susan Misner as Jessica Arndt, Reese's deceased lover. After Jessica's relationship with Reese ended, she married another man, but remained in contact with Reese.
- Wrenn Schmidt as Iris Campbell, a therapist assigned to speak with Reese, working undercover as NYPD Detective John Riley, after his involvement in shooting incidents as a police officer. At the end of the episode "Skip", she develops a romantic relationship with Reese.
- Jimmi Simpson as Logan Pierce, a tech billionaire and person of interest in the middle of the second season, who returned towards the end of the fifth season and, together with two other former persons of interest – Joey Durban and Harper Rose – forms a second team also working for the Machine, that is based out of Washington, D.C.
- Annie Ilonzeh as Harper Rose, a drifter and opportunistic con artist who first appears in "Blunt" as a person of interest when she tries to independently double-cross both a drug cartel and the Brotherhood. At the end of the episode "Skip", it is revealed that the Machine is starting to anonymously use her as an asset. In "Synecdoche", it is revealed that Harper has become part of a second team working for the Machine in Washington, D.C., with former persons of interest Joey Durban and Logan Pierce.
- James Carpinello as Joey Durban, one of the machine's first numbers in the first season who returns at the end of the series to reveal that he – together with two former persons of interest, Harper Rose and Logan Pierce – has formed a second team in the nation's capital
- Alex Shimizu as Tatsuro Daizo, a programmer recruited by Root to help protect the Machine's assets from Samaritan
- Michael Esper as Jason Greenfield, a hacker and former member of Vigilance that becomes an asset of the Machine
- Joseph Mazzello as Daniel Casey, a hacker formerly targeted by the CIA for discovering the existence of the Machine. He is recruited as an asset to protect the Machine's operatives from Samaritan.

==== Government ====
The following characters are tied to a government project related to the development and use of the Machine:

- John Doman as Ross Garrison, a US senator charged with overseeing the Northern Lights project
- Elizabeth Marvel as Alicia Corwin, a liaison between Ingram and the government while the Machine was being developed and a former member of the National Security Council
- Camryn Manheim as Control, the woman who is the head of the ISA's operation (code-named "Northern Lights") regarding the Machine. To protect the Machine, she sanctioned the suicide bombing that killed Ingram and caused Finch's injuries. When the plug is pulled on "Northern Lights", she is unwittingly installed as a puppet heading Samaritan, a position with which she becomes more and more uneasy.
- Boris McGiver as Hersh, the Special Counsel's enforcer, a former member of the ISA
- Jay O. Sanders as the Special Counsel, a shadowy figure from the Office of Special Counsel who appears to be coordinating the activity regarding the Machine and sees Reese as a threat
- Cotter Smith as Denton Weeks, the official who commissioned the development of the Machine while he was a Deputy Director of the NSA
- Jacob Pitts as Henry Peck, an NSA analyst who stumbles upon the existence of the Machine, putting him in grave danger

==== NYPD ====
- Sterling K. Brown as Cal Beecher, an NYPD Narcotics detective with whom Carter had begun a relationship. Beecher is Alonzo Quinn's godson but was unaware of Quinn's activities.
- Anthony Mangano as Kane, an NYPD homicide detective with whom Carter and Fusco periodically work
- Michael McGlone as Bill Szymanski, an NYPD Organized Crime Unit detective with whom Carter sometimes works
- Ned Eisenberg as Joseph Soriano, an Internal Affairs detective investigating Fusco for corruption
- Adria Arjona as Dani Silva, an undercover Internal Affairs detective whose investigation attracts the attention of the Brotherhood

==== HR ====
The following characters are involved in the HR storyline, in which a group of corrupt police officers and public officials work to control organized crime in New York:

- Robert John Burke as Patrick Simmons, a uniformed NYPD patrol officer who is a right-hand man to Quinn and HR's second-in-command. He handles HR activities on the street level.
- John Fiore as Womack, the Homicide Division captain and Carter and Fusco's supervisor
- Michael Mulheren as Arthur Lynch, an NYPD captain and major figure in HR with whom Fusco appeared to be working in the first season
- Clarke Peters as Alonzo Quinn, the mayor's chief of staff and the head of HR
- Al Sapienza as Raymond Terney, an NYPD detective working for HR who periodically crosses paths with Carter
- Brian Wiles as Mike Laskey, a rookie NYPD officer (and mole for the Russian mob) affiliated with HR who is installed as Carter's new partner after she is demoted to officer for getting too close to HR
- James Hanlon as James Stills, a corrupt NYPD Narcotics detective who orders a hit on Reese

==== The Mob ====
- Enrico Colantoni as Carl G. Elias, a nascent crime boss and the illegitimate son of Mafia don Gianni Moretti. Elias is determined to revive and reunite the Five Families of New York City and to purge Brighton Beach in Brooklyn of the expanding grip of the Russian mob, in particular the Yogorov crime family headed by Peter Yogorov. Although not a "good" man, Elias is generally seen as a source of order and stability in the underworld and considered the lesser of two evils.
- David Valcin as Anthony S. "Scarface" Marconi, Elias' lieutenant, principal enforcer and close friend. He is in charge of executing Elias' directives, speaking for Elias, and operating in his place. He occasionally acted as Elias's eyes and ears on the ground, especially when Elias was incarcerated.
- James LeGros as Bruce Moran, Elias's accountant and close friend of both him and Anthony Marconi from boyhood. He attempts to hold Elias's empire together while Elias recovers from the Samaritan attack.
- Mark Margolis as Don Gianni Moretti, a mob boss and leader of one of the five Italian crime families
- Morgan Spector as Peter Yogorov, leader of the Russian mob, specifically the Yogorov crime family, and Elias' nemesis for control of New York's criminal underworld

==== CIA ====
The following characters are part of Reese's backstory relating to his time with the CIA:

- Michael Kelly as Mark Snow, a CIA Agent who once worked with Reese
- Annie Parisse as Kara Stanton, an ex-CIA Agent and Reese's former CIA partner who was widely believed to be dead, but is later recruited by Decima Technologies
- Darien Sills-Evans as Tyrell Evans, a CIA Agent working with Snow

==== Decima Technologies ====
The following characters are involved in the Decima Technologies storyline, a shadowy private intelligence agency that is gathering data illegally and is in possession of the AI Samaritan:

- John Nolan as John Greer, a mysterious, arrogant, former MI6 Agent who is the director of operations for Decima Technologies and runs the Samaritan AI
- Julian Ovenden as Jeremy Lambert, an operative for Decima Technologies, and Greer's right-hand man
- Cara Buono as Martine Rousseau, a psychotic former investigator for the United Nations, now a Decima Technologies and Samaritan operative
- Oakes Fegley as Gabriel Hayward, a young boy who acts as Samaritan's "analog interface"
- Joshua Close as Jeff Blackwell, an ex-con who is recruited by Samaritan
- Robert Manning Jr. as Zachary, an operative for Decima Technologies who later becomes a Samaritan agent
- Leslie Odom Jr. as Peter Collier, the leader of Vigilance, a violent organization which professes to protect people's privacy
- Quinn Shephard as Claire Mahoney, a former college student looking for a purpose when she finds Samaritan

==== The Brotherhood ====
The following characters are involved in the Brotherhood drug gang storyline:

- Winston Duke as Dominic "Mini" Besson, the leader of the Brotherhood gang
- Jamie Hector as Link Cordell, a violent gang member and Dominic's right-hand man
- Jessica Pimentel as Floyd, another of Dominic's higher-ups, often appearing in place of Link

==== Computer systems ====
- The Machine is an artificially intelligent system, created at the request of the US government, to sift through the data collected by NSA mass surveillance. It is able to accurately predict premeditated lethal crime by analyzing the data from all surveillance cameras and electronic communications worldwide which are fed to it by arrangement with the NSA.
- Samaritan: Initially developed by Arthur Claypool (a former MIT classmate of Finch's and Ingram's) at the NSA, Samaritan was the result of a second project that was terminated by Congress when the Machine was developed first. Unlike the Machine, Samaritan is designed as a more open system rather than a black box, lacking the precautionary restrictions Finch had built into the Machine, and can be directed at specific targets.

== Episodes ==
Season	Episodes	Originally released	
Season	Episodes	First released	Last released
1	23	September 22, 2011	May 17, 2012
2	22	September 27, 2012	May 9, 2013
3	23	September 24, 2013	May 13, 2014
4	22	September 23, 2014	May 5, 2015
5	13	May 3, 2016	June 21, 2016

== Production ==
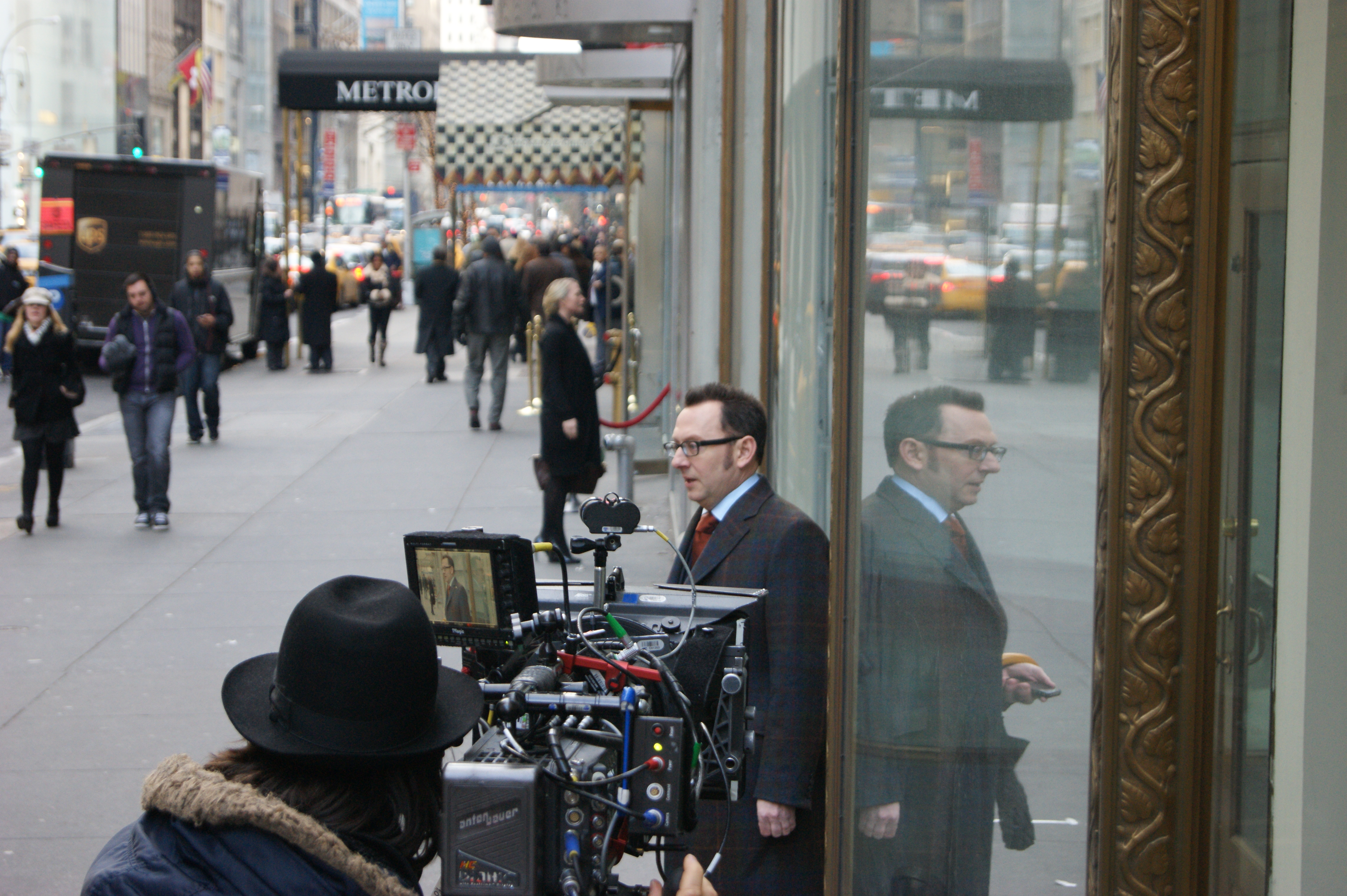
Michael Emerson filming Person of Interest in New York

The series was officially picked up by CBS on May 13, 2011, and debuted on September 22, 2011. On October 25, 2011, the show received a full season order. It was renewed for a second season on March 14, 2012, by CBS, which premiered on September 27, 2012. CBS renewed Person of Interest for a third season on March 27, 2013, with Sarah Shahi and Amy Acker promoted to series regulars.

The series was renewed for a fourth season on March 13, 2014, and was renewed for its fifth and final season on May 11, 2015. ADR recording for the series was done at recording studio Cherry Beach Sound. The music is composed by Ramin Djawadi. The first season soundtrack was released on November 12, 2012. The second soundtrack was released on January 21, 2014. The third soundtrack, which contained music from the third and fourth season was released on January 29, 2016.

=== Cancellation ===
The primary reason for the cancellation of the series after its fifth season was that the show was not profitable enough for CBS, as much of the ad revenue went to Warner Bros., who owned the show. If there had been a sixth season, the events of the fifth season would not have been compressed into a 13-episode arc, as showrunner Greg Plageman acknowledged. The Samaritan arc may have been longer, and it is likely that some of what happened in the fifth season may have been reserved for the sixth season. Another story that may have occurred in the sixth season is exploring the main characters' "backups" that were stored in the Machine.

== Reception ==
According to CBS, Person of Interest received the highest test ratings of any drama pilot in 15 years, what one CBS executive called "crazy broad appeal you don't usually see", prompting CBS to move CSI, which was broadcast on Thursday for over 10 years, to Wednesday, opening up a slot for Person of Interest. The pilot episode won its time slot, drawing 13.2 million viewers.

=== Critical reception ===
The first season of Person of Interest received generally positive reviews, with the pilot episode drawing a favorable response from critics and later episodes receiving higher praise. On Metacritic, the season scored 66 out of 100 based on 26 reviews. Of the pilot, David Wiegand of the San Francisco Chronicle said "Person of Interest separates itself from the gimmick pack, not only because of superbly nuanced characterization and writing but also because of how it engages a post-9/11 sense of paranoia in its viewers."

David Hinckley of the New York Daily News gave the pilot four stars out of five, commenting on Caviezel's and Emerson's performances, saying Caviezel "brings the right stuff to this role" and Emerson "is fascinating as Mr. Finch." Mary McNamara of the Los Angeles Times stated that in regard to the pilot, "the notion of preventing crimes rather than solving them is an appealing twist... The surveillance graphics are very cool." The episodes "Many Happy Returns" and the finale "Firewall" were particularly acclaimed. Tim Surette of TV.com called the former one of the series' "best episodes", commending Caviezel's performance and the episode's character exploration, while the latter was called "exactly what a season finale should be", with Surette concluding his review by saying "'Firewall' was a spectacular finish to what has been an incredibly surprising first season of Person of Interest."

On Rotten Tomatoes, the season has an approval rating of 63% and average rating of 6.7 out of 10 based on 38 reviews. The site's critical consensus is, "Person of Interest is a well made and well acted espionage procedural, though its characters aren't terribly well developed and its intriguing premise yields mixed results."

The second season received positive reviews. Surette praised the premiere episode as "vintage Person of Interest amplified, showing off its trademark combination of complex intrigue, creative action, and clever innovation in bigger ways than ever before." He praised guest star Ken Leung's character as "one of the greatest POIs the series has had" and praised the episode's overall narrative, as well as the flashbacks. "Prisoner's Dilemma" and "Relevance" were the two highest-rated episodes of the season, with Surette calling the former "as complete an episode of Person of Interest as there's ever been" and The A.V. Club's Phil Dyess-Nugent praising Jonathan Nolan's directorial work in the latter.

The season finale "God Mode" also attracted positive reactions. Nugent called it an "unapologetically kick-ass episode" with some "terrific action set-pieces". On Rotten Tomatoes, the season has an approval rating of 100% and average rating of 8 out of 10 based on 8 reviews. The site's critical consensus is, "Smartly plotted and consistently thrilling, Person of Interest's second season delivers dazzlingly dramatic episodes that skillfully develop the show's overarching narrative."

The third season received highly positive reviews, and is noteworthy for drawing in more critics for its exploration of artificial intelligence, as well as its timely storytelling format. In regards to the season, Slant Magazine said that the show "is at its best when sticking to cutting-edge topics" and called it a "solid action-thriller that intersperses twist-filled standalone episodes into its season-long arcs." The A.V. Club said that the show captures the "national post-post-9/11 mood" and that with the mid-season arc in season three, "turns conspiracy theory into art".

The season's two story arcs both received a considerable amount of praise: the two episodes ending the HR storyline are commonly considered to be some of the best episodes of Person of Interest. Matt Fowler of IGN gave "The Crossing" a 10 out of 10, reacting extremely positively to the cliffhanger at the ending. The episode to follow, "The Devil's Share", was the most acclaimed episode of the season, being praised for its opening sequence, its writing, Chris Fisher's direction, and the acting performances, especially those by Jim Caviezel and Kevin Chapman. Surette called the episode a "stunner" and declared it as the series' possible best episode, praising the opening sequence as the "greatest sequence the series ever put together", feeling it succeeded in eclipsing the devastation induced by Carter's death. Surette also praised Fusco's effectiveness and character development in the episode, as well naming the cinematography and direction to be the best of the series, and identifying points of symbolism in the episode he felt were noteworthy and effective. Fowler gave the episode an "amazing" rating of a 9.3 out of 10, also praising the opening sequence, as well as the flashbacks and the ending scene.

Phil Dyess-Nugent of The A.V. Club gave the episode a perfect A rating, praising the atmosphere of grief the episode built and feeling Fusco's character development served as an appropriate tribute to Carter. On Rotten Tomatoes, the season has an approval rating of 100% and average rating of 7.7 out of 10 based on 11 reviews. The site's critical consensus is, "Person of Interest weaves compelling standalone stories into its engrossing serial narrative, and incorporates welcome bursts of humor into its sci-fi mystery core."

The fourth season received highly positive reviews, with critics praising the thematic value of the Samaritan storyline. The episode "If-Then-Else" garnered near-unanimous praise from critics and audiences alike, with many considering the episode to be the best entry in the series. Fowler gave the episode a perfect rating of 10 out 10, indicating it to a "masterpiece", and praised the simulation format, the action scenes, the emotional value, and the ending. He called the episode "next-level inventive" and a "jolting, exciting, heart-wrenching episode". Fowler said the ending scene "crushed" him, and he offered praise to the significance of the flashbacks to the chess games.

Alexa Planje of The A.V. Club gave the episode an A rating, and in her review, said that though the task of executing a story structured like "If-Then-Else" was difficult, the episode did so "elegantly" – she cited the "interesting score, vibrant color work, and humor" as the key elements. Planje said the episode "aces every scenario" during the simulation segments, and appreciated how the episode transformed itself from what appeared to be a "standard mission-focused story" into a "moving ode" to Shaw. She praised the episode's exploration of the parallels between being a human and being a machine.

Shant Istamboulian of Entertainment Weekly lauded Emerson's performance in the flashbacks and felt the season marked the series' "creative peak". He concluded by saying "Moving like a rocket, this episode is fast, funny, exciting, and, ultimately, sad, ending with what seems like the loss of another team member. We'll have to wait until next week for the outcome, but as it stands, "If-Then-Else" is an instant classic." Surette had high praise for the episode, calling it "playful, mind-bending, heart-breaking, and flat-out excellent." He praised the episode's incorporation of its "recurring theme of sacrifice", and called the flashbacks "as fascinating and provocative as anything the series has done." Surette cited his favorite part of the episode as the exploration of the Machine's perspective, and additionally praised the humorous segments.

On Rotten Tomatoes, the season has an approval rating of 100% and average rating of 8.3 out of 10 based on 12 reviews. The site's critical consensus is, "Thought-provoking, grounded sci-fi makes season four of Person of Interest as compelling as it is timely."

The fifth season received highly positive reviews. On Rotten Tomatoes, the season has an approval rating of 100% and average rating of 8.7 out of 10 based on 14 reviews. The site's critical consensus is, "Person of Interest concludes in a satisfying fifth season that both deepens the characters that audiences have grown to love and delivers a cracking arc about the dangers of technology."

=== Ratings ===
Season	Time slot (ET)	Premiere		Finale		TV season	Rank	Viewers (in millions)	Live + DVR viewers
Season	Time slot (ET)	Date	Viewers (in millions)	Date	Viewers (in millions)	TV season	Rank	Viewers (in millions)	Live + DVR viewers
1	Thursday 9:00 p.m.	September 22, 2011	13.33	May 17, 2012	13.47	2011–12	#13	14.34	16.28
2	Thursday 9:00 p.m.	September 27, 2012	14.28	May 9, 2013	13.16	2012–13	#5	16.07	17.87
3	Tuesday 10:00 p.m.	September 24, 2013	12.44	May 13, 2014	10.95	2013–14	#8	14.05	16.21
4	Tuesday 10:00 p.m.	September 23, 2014	10.58	May 5, 2015	8.18	2014–15	#21	12.22	13.11
5	Monday 10:00 p.m.; Tuesday 10:00 p.m.	May 3, 2016	7.35	June 21, 2016	6.51	2015–16	N/A	6.14	N/A

CBS said that Person of Interest was, ratings-wise, the fastest-growing drama on broadcast television from the 2011–12 season to the 2012–13 season, using ratings up to December 2.

== Broadcast ==
Person of Interest has been picked up by many networks for broadcast outside the United States. It premiered in Australia on Nine Network on September 25, 2011. The series was simulcast in Canada and premiered on City on September 22, 2011, and moved to CTV in 2013. It premiered in the UK on Channel 5 on August 14, 2012.

== Awards and nominations ==
Year	Association	Category	Nominee(s) / episode	Result	Ref.
2012	Golden Reel Awards	Best Sound Editing – Short Form Dialogue and ADR in Television	Thomas DeGorter, H. Jay Levine, Maciek Malish, Matt Sawelson / "Witness"	Nominated	
2012	Hollywood Post Alliance	Outstanding Sound – Television	Thomas DeGorter, Keith Rogers, Matt Sawelson, Scott Weber / "Matsya Nyaya"	Nominated	
2012	IGN	Best TV Action Series	Person of Interest	Nominated	
2012	NAACP Image Awards	Outstanding Actress in a Drama Series	Taraji P. Henson	Nominated	
2012	People's Choice Awards	Favorite New TV Drama	Person of Interest	Won	
2012	Primetime Creative Arts Emmy Awards	Outstanding Sound Mixing for a Comedy or Drama Series (One Hour)	Noah Timan, Keith Rogers, Frank Morrone, Scott Weber / "Pilot"	Nominated	
2013	Golden Reel Awards	Best Sound Editing – Short Form Music in Television	Tom Trafalski / "Firewall"	Nominated	
2013	IGN	Best TV Action Series	Person of Interest	Nominated	
2013	IGN	Best TV Hero	Taraji P. Henson for the character "Joss Carter"	Nominated	
2014	IGN	Best TV Action Series	Person of Interest	Nominated	
2014	NAACP Image Awards	Outstanding Supporting Actress in a Drama Series	Taraji P. Henson	Won	
2014	People's Choice Awards	Favorite Dramatic TV Actor	Jim Caviezel	Nominated	
2015	IGN	People's Choice TV Series	Person of Interest	Won	
2015	IGN	Best TV Action Series	Person of Interest	Won	
2015	IGN	People's Choice TV Action Series	Person of Interest	Won	
2015	IGN	Best TV Episode	"If-Then-Else"	Nominated	
2015	Saturn Awards	Best Network Television Series	Person of Interest	Nominated	
2016	Edgar Allan Poe Awards	Best Television Episode Teleplay	Erik Mountain, Melissa Scrivner Love / "Terra Incognita"	Nominated	
2016	IGN	Best TV Series	Person of Interest	Nominated	
2016	IGN	Best TV Action Series	Person of Interest	Won	
2016	People's Choice Awards	Favorite TV Crime Drama Actor	Jim Caviezel	Nominated	
2016	People's Choice Awards	Favorite TV Crime Drama	Person of Interest	Won	
2016	World Soundtrack Awards	Television Composer of the Year	Ramin Djawadi	Nominated	
2017	Edgar Allan Poe Awards	Best Television Episode Teleplay	Jonathan Nolan, Denise Thé / "return 0"	Nominated	
2017	Globes de Cristal Award	Best Foreign TV series	Person of Interest	Won	

== See also ==
- Combat Zones That See
- Pre-crime
