= John Reese (Person of Interest) =

- Person of Interest character
- First appearance: "Pilot"
- Last appearance: "return 0"
- Portrayed by: Jim Caviezel

In-universe information
- Aliases: John Rooney ("Risk", "No Good Deed", "Firewall", "Critical", "Zero Day"); John Anderson ("Bury the Lede"); John Campbell ("The High Road"); John Hayes ("Super"); John Randall ("Masquerate"); John Warren ("Prisoner's Dilemma"); John Wiley ("One Percent", "Lady Killer", "4C"); Tony Miller ("Mission Creep"); Det. Stills ("Ghosts", "Wolf and Cub", "Many Happy Returns", "No Good Deed", "The Contingency", "Bad Code", "Endgame", "Beta"); Marshal Jennings ("Shadow Box", "Proteus"); Frank Mercer ("Most Likely To..."); Jeffery Abbot ("Death Benefit"); John Riley ("Panopticon", "Nautilus", "Wingman", "Brotherhood", "Prophets", "Pretenders")
- Nicknames: Mr. Reese; The Man in the Suit; Wonder Boy; Mr. Congeniality; Mr. Happy; The Big Lug
- Gender: Male
- Occupation: Green Beret (formerly); CIA officer (formerly); Freelance Private Investigator; NYPD Homicide Detective (Cover Identity)
- Family: Conor (father; deceased); Margaret (mother; deceased); Sophie (sister; presumably deceased)
- Significant others: Jessica Arndt (ex-girlfriend; deceased); Joss Carter (love interest; deceased); Dr. Iris Campbell (ex-girlfriend); Zoe Morgan (on-and-off girlfriend)
- Nationality: American
- Rank (DOR): Sergeant (SGT 19980915)

John Reese is a fictional character and the protagonist of the CBS crime drama television series Person of Interest. Reese is portrayed by actor Jim Caviezel. He works with billionaire Harold Finch to help residents of New York who are potentially involved in violent crime.

Reese is an intense, solitary man whose dry sense of humor emerges over time. He speaks in a low, calm, and confident voice. Extremely skilled with a range of weapons and combat techniques due to his military experience, Reese possesses a level of determination that drives him to work with Finch to protect potential victims of violent crime. Reese owns a dog named Bear (previously named Butcher), a Belgian Malinois who he rescued from white supremacists.

== Fictional character biography ==
=== Background ===
Born in Puyallup, Washington, Reese's real name is unknown, "John Reese" being a pseudonym he assumed at some time prior to late 2006, when he began service in the Central Intelligence Agency. According to his military records, John is, in fact, his first name, with a middle initial H, while his last name begins with the letters TAL and ends with an S. He was born on May 1. Little else is known about his early life. He describes himself as having no friends and no family. It is mentioned that his father served in the Army and died as a war hero after his fourth tour in Vietnam.

It is known that, in 1993, John joined the U.S. Army to avoid a jail sentence, and served as an infantryman, and Green Beret, before being discharged as a Sergeant after 12 years of service. While he was stationed at Fort Lewis, Washington in 2001, John met Jessica Arndt, a nurse with whom he fell in love. On a vacation to Mexico, he tells Jessica that he has left the Army just as they witnesses the Twin Towers fall on television and he decides his military career is far from over. Eventually, John breaks up with Jessica and is recruited by the CIA. Some time after that, they meet by chance in an airport, where a newly engaged Jessica gives John a final opportunity to save their relationship by asking him to ask her to wait for him; he is unable to do so.

John joins the CIA in 2005 and is recruited by the elite Special Activities Division of the CIA, by which time he is using the last name "Reese". Sometime in 2006 he is partnered with Kara Stanton, and they are assigned to black ops activities by their handler, Mark Snow. Although Reese demonstrates the skills necessary to conduct the missions to which he is assigned, he shows some hesitation to commit fully to them as he lacks the ruthlessness shown by Kara. He gradually lets go of his inhibitions, becoming a cold-blooded killer. Together, he and Kara participate in a number of successful missions, several of which illegally take place in the U.S., which Kara refers to as "enemy territory." During this period Reese begins a relationship with Kara after a successful assassination.

During a mission hiatus, intelligence officer Reese encounters Jessica's spouse, Peter Arndt, at a clandestine establishment. Maintaining operational discretion, Reese departs before introductions can be made. Years later, amidst a Middle Eastern deployment, Reese receives a voicemail from Jessica requesting urgent contact. Promising a swift return within 24 hours, Reese seeks leave. However, his superior, Snow, redirects him to a clandestine mission in China.

Upon arrival in China, Reese and Stanton are briefed by Snow and a member of the National Security Council, Alicia Corwin. Their mission is to enter an abandoned Chinese city and recover highly sensitive computer files on a laptop. Unknown to one another, Snow tells each agent that the other has been compromised and is to be killed at the end of their mission. Entering the city, Reese and Stanton find the workers where the laptop is believed to be kept newly dead of gunshot wounds, but they are able to safely recover the laptop.

Following successful mission completion, Agent Stanton initiated exfiltration protocols. However, Agent Reese detected a potential threat to his own safety. Before initiating counter-measures, he sustained critical injuries during a sudden engagement. Prior to extraction, Reese identified a possible shift in mission parameters; the retrieval of the data device may have been a secondary objective, with its eradication taking precedence. This suggests a potential compromise within the agency, with both operatives targeted for elimination to prevent unauthorized access to sensitive information. Evacuating the compromised location, Agent Reese observed its subsequent destruction via airstrike. The status of Agent Stanton remains unconfirmed at this time.

It's unclear how Reese found his way back to the U.S. but, in February 2011, while his bullet wound is still healing, Reese goes to the hospital where Jessica works, hoping to see her. Instead, he learns that she was killed in a car crash two months earlier. From there, he travels to her home in New York and breaks in. He sits quietly, watching videos of Jessica while waiting for Peter to return home. As he does, he deduces that Jessica and Peter's marriage had been physically abusive and that Peter may have killed her during a violent altercation, then staged the car crash. When Peter arrives, they argue briefly before Reese approaches the poker-wielding widower. Peter Arndt disappears that night and the FBI believes he was killed by Reese, but later events suggest that Reese took Peter to be incarcerated in a prison in Torreón, Mexico.

Reese then returns to New York City and drops off the grid entirely, living first in a homeless encampment and later a SRO until he is sought out by Harold Finch.

=== Activities with Harold Finch ===
"I offered you a job, Mr. Reese. I didn't say it would be easy."

— Harold Finch, Pilot

After Jessica's death, Reese begins living as an unkempt vagrant on the streets of New York, attempting to escape from his demons with alcohol and martial arts movies. One day in the spring of 2011, he confronts a group of young men harassing passengers on the subway, resulting in their arrest.

Reese is taken to the NYPD 8th Precinct, where he is questioned by Detective Joss Carter. Carter recognizes his skills as military in origin, but Reese avoids her questions, piquing her curiosity. A fingerprint check suggests Reese has been at several recent crime scenes, but before Carter can learn more, Reese leaves with an expensive attorney. They are met by a car and driver, who take him to a park under the Queensboro Bridge, where Reese first meets Harold Finch.

At first, Reese is suspicious of Finch and his claims to know "everything" about him. Finch recounts painful facts from Reese's recent history before telling Reese what he needs is a purpose and a job. They return to Manhattan, and walk through the streets as Finch describes the information he has about people in need of help, appealing to what he perceives as Reese's desire to help people. Finch explains that he has a list of people in need of help, pointing out a woman at a coffee cart who is on the top of the list. Finch offers Reese a chance to help the people on his list, explaining he wants Reese to follow the woman and do what needs to be done to help her, all expenses paid. Reese refuses, describing Finch as a "bored rich guy" who has probably staged the whole situation for his amusement.

Reese returns to his room, where he changes into clean clothing, cuts his hair and shaves off his beard in order to change his appearance. He was fast asleep drinking cheap whiskey while the television blares, but awakens cable-tied to the bed. The phone rings; it is Finch insisting his information is never wrong. Reese hears the sounds of a woman under attack nearby and quickly frees himself. Breaking into the next room, he finds Finch with a recording of a woman murdered three years earlier. Having made his point to Reese, Finch promises he will never lie to him, unlike the government who Reese left and that he believes that all Reese wants to do is protect people in need. The truth cuts close to the bone now certain that Finch is not government, Reese asks who Finch is, and is told he is a "concerned third party" who can offer Reese the chance to help people who otherwise have none.

Reese accepts Finch's offer and begins following Diane Hansen, an assistant district attorney. Finch takes Reese to his hidden workplace, a disused library Finch bought via a bank he controls. As they work together, Reese teaches Finch about his strategies and becomes increasingly curious about who Finch is fueled by his insistence he's a very private person. Equipped with six cover identities and funds, Reese sees Finch's lengthy list for the first time; social security numbers the origin of which Finch refuses to divulge. As Reese undertakes his investigation, he and Finch establish their working model: Reese in the field and Finch on the computer continuously connected by cell phone and ear bud as they report to each other.

Reese's curiosity about Finch grows and he makes little effort to hide the fact he is gathering information about Finch. As their first case progresses, Reese discovers corrupt police are involved, and realizes he's in a more complex situation than he expected. He presses Finch for more details about where he gets his information. They walk through a park and Reese listens as Finch tells him about a complex computer called "the Machine", his role in its development and how it creates the relevant and irrelevant lists to find potential criminals. With more information and a stolen identity based on a badge taken from NYPD Detective Stills, a corrupt cop whom he killed in action. Once the case is closed and having enlisted the reluctant assistance of Detective Lionel Fusco, Reese now fully commits to working with Finch.

Over time, Reese and Finch come to trust one another, and then gradually become friends. Finch generally refers to Reese as Mr. Reese, using his first name only when concerned. Reese continues to gather bits of information about Finch, eventually discovering, he, too has experienced a loss similar to Reese's own. While helping a doctor determined to avenge her sister, Reese begins to question his own life, and his relationship to violence, realizing he can make a choice to kill or not to kill. As he does, he grows increasingly grateful to Finch, both for saving his life, and for being his friend. Finch is more reserved, but spares no cost or effort to save Reese's life when he is shot by a CIA sniper. Later, Finch returns Reese's regard by giving him as a birthday gift a loft overlooking a park Reese visits. As their friendship evolves, Reese becomes increasingly protective of Finch, particularly following Finch's kidnapping by Root. He gives Finch his dog Bear as a companion, but also as a means to protect Finch when he's not around. Reese even refused to believe the worst of Finch when Shaw made aspersions against him. When Reese introduces Shaw to "the Machine", she deduces the complex computer is an AI, which Reese concludes is correct.

=== Death ===
In the series finale, "return 0", Reese sacrifices himself, to enable the AI called "the Machine" to destroy an AI called Samaritan, its opponent, by holding off Samaritan agents trying to intervene. While Finch intended to do the job himself, Reese had made a deal with "the Machine", the AI which guided Reese and Finch through the seasons, telling Finch he'd come to realize that saving one life is important depending on the life that is saved. Guided by direct contact with the Machine, Reese holds off the Samaritan agents but is gunned down moments before a cruise missile destroys the building. Reese's sacrifice allows the Machine to destroy Samaritan and Finch honors his sacrifice by returning to his fiancée and a normal life.

== "The Man in the Suit" ==
With the entry of Harold Finch into his life, Reese undergoes a series of wardrobe changes that help to earn him the moniker "The Man in the Suit." Possessed of some money despite his vagrant lifestyle, Reese is able to get a haircut and purchase clean clothes following his first encounter with Finch, first a tee-shirt and jeans, then a dark shirt and leather jacket he wears for his first day they work together. Later, when fully funded by Finch, he opts for simple dark suits, worn first with an open-collared colored shirt, and finally with his trademark white shirt, along with a black wool topcoat in cold weather. He also wears concealable white body armor under his shirt. When Reese's activities with Finch first attract the attention of law enforcement, notably that of Detective Joss Carter, the first description she hears of a mysterious man taking the law into his own hands is that of a "tall guy in a dark suit." That description soon morphs into "The Man in the Suit", her nickname for him, as she pursues him through the early episodes of the series. The nickname soon leads to Reese becoming something of an urban legend in New York. According to the legend, a tall, nicely dressed man in a suit often shows up unexpectedly and always in time to halt a violent crime from happening, saving innocents and injuring perpetrators, to varying degrees, in the process.

== Skills ==
As he works with Finch, Reese displays a range of skills he has learned in the Special Forces and the CIA. He is intelligent, resourceful, and hyper-vigilant. His quick-thinking often helps him deal with any sticky situation. He has highly developed hand-to-hand combat techniques, and can easily take on multiple opponents at once. He maintains a small arsenal in his home, and can use a variety of handguns and assault weapons efficiently. Able to shoot with a high level of control and accuracy, he will often choose to wound (typically kneecap) rather than kill his targets. He is also shown to be ambidextrous, often switching a gun between hands as conditions require, but this skill is never spoken of. He is also adept with a knife, and at improvising weapons from the various materials he finds at hand. Reese's training has also made him highly resistant to pain, and he is able to remain clear-headed even when enduring multiple gunshot wounds, as well as to resist brutal interrogation and torture techniques. He is also known for having good improvisational skills because whenever he is forced into an unnecessary conversation, he remains calm and talks his way out.
