= List of Person of Interest episodes =

Person of Interest is an American science fiction crime drama television series created by Jonathan Nolan, who serves as an executive producer alongside J. J. Abrams, Bryan Burk, Chris Fisher, Greg Plageman, and Denise Thé. The series premiered on CBS on September 22, 2011, and stars Jim Caviezel as John Reese, a former CIA agent who is presumed dead. He is approached by a mysterious billionaire named Harold Finch (Michael Emerson) who is trying to prevent violent crimes before they happen by using an advanced surveillance system dubbed "The Machine" that provides the Social Security number of a person of interest who will be involved in an imminent lethal crime as either a perpetrator or a victim. Their unique brand of vigilante justice attracts the attention of two NYPD officers, Joss Carter (Taraji P. Henson) and Lionel Fusco (Kevin Chapman), whom Reese uses to his advantage as he investigates the person of interest. Reese and Finch are later aided by Samantha "Root" Groves (Amy Acker), a highly intelligent computer hacker and contract killer whom the Machine later identifies as its "analog interface", and Sameen Shaw (Sarah Shahi), a former ISA assassin who unknowingly dealt with the "relevant" numbers found by the Machine.

During the course of the series, 103 episodes of Person of Interest aired over five seasons, between September 22, 2011, and June 21, 2016.

== Series overview ==
Season	Episodes	Originally released	
Season	Episodes	First released	Last released
1	23	September 22, 2011	May 17, 2012
2	22	September 27, 2012	May 9, 2013
3	23	September 24, 2013	May 13, 2014
4	22	September 23, 2014	May 5, 2015
5	13	May 3, 2016	June 21, 2016

== Episodes ==
=== Season 1 (2011–12) ===
No. overall	No. in season	Title	Directed by	Written by	Original release date	Prod. code	U.S. viewers (millions)
1	1	"Pilot"	David Semel	Jonathan Nolan	September 22, 2011	296807	13.33
2	2	"Ghosts"	Richard J. Lewis	Greg Plageman & Jonathan Nolan	September 29, 2011	2J6202	12.51
3	3	"Mission Creep"	Steven DePaul	Patrick Harbinson	October 6, 2011	2J6203	11.57
4	4	"Cura Te Ipsum"	Charles Beeson	Denise Thé	October 13, 2011	2J6204	12.04
5	5	"Judgment"	Colin Bucksey	David Slack	October 20, 2011	2J6205	12.42
6	6	"The Fix"	Dennis Smith	Nic Van Zeebroeck & Michael Sopczynski	October 27, 2011	2J6206	11.62
7	7	"Witness"	Frederick E. O. Toye	Amanda Segel	November 3, 2011	2J6207	11.76
8	8	"Foe"	Milan Cheylov	Sean Hennen	November 17, 2011	2J6208	11.65
9	9	"Get Carter"	Alex Zakrzewski	Greg Plageman & Denise Thé	December 8, 2011	2J6209	12.66
10	10	"Number Crunch"	Jeffrey Hunt	Patrick Harbinson	December 15, 2011	2J6210	12.93
11	11	"Super"	Stephen Williams	David Slack	January 12, 2012	2J6211	14.86
12	12	"Legacy"	Brad Anderson	Amanda Segel	January 19, 2012	2J6212	14.40
13	13	"Root Cause"	Richard J. Lewis	Erik Mountain	February 2, 2012	2J6213	15.10
14	14	"Wolf and Cub"	Chris Fisher	Nic Van Zeebroeck & Michael Sopczynski	February 9, 2012	2J6214	15.14
15	15	"Blue Code"	David Von Ancken	Denise Thé	February 16, 2012	2J6215	13.16
16	16	"Risk"	Jeff T. Thomas	Sean Hennen	February 23, 2012	2J6216	14.56
17	17	"Baby Blue"	Larry Teng	Patrick Harbinson	March 8, 2012	2J6217	15.67
18	18	"Identity Crisis"	Charles Beeson	Amy Berg	March 29, 2012	2J6218	14.59
19	19	"Flesh and Blood"	Stephen Semel	Amanda Segel	April 5, 2012	2J6219	13.69
20	20	"Matsya Nyaya"	Kevin Bray	Ray Utarnachitt	April 26, 2012	2J6220	12.73
21	21	"Many Happy Returns"	Frederick E. O. Toye	Story by : Erik Mountain & Jonathan Nolan; Teleplay by : Erik Mountain	May 3, 2012	2J6221	13.27
22	22	"No Good Deed"	Stephen Williams	David Slack	May 10, 2012	2J6222	12.96
23	23	"Firewall"	Richard J. Lewis	Greg Plageman & Jonathan Nolan	May 17, 2012	2J6223	13.47

=== Season 2 (2012–13) ===
No. overall	No. in season	Title	Directed by	Written by	Original release date	Prod. code	U.S. viewers (millions)
24	1	"The Contingency"	Richard J. Lewis	Denise Thé & Jonathan Nolan	September 27, 2012	2J7201	14.28
25	2	"Bad Code"	Jon Cassar	Greg Plageman & Patrick Harbinson	October 4, 2012	2J7202	14.58
26	3	"Masquerade"	Jeffrey Hunt	Melissa Scrivner Love	October 18, 2012	2J7203	13.93
27	4	"Triggerman"	James Whitmore, Jr.	Erik Mountain	October 25, 2012	2J7204	14.03
28	5	"Bury the Lede"	Jeffrey Hunt	David Slack	November 1, 2012	2J7205	13.66
29	6	"The High Road"	Félix Alcalá	Nic Van Zeebroeck & Michael Sopczynski	November 8, 2012	2J7206	14.87
30	7	"Critical"	Frederick E. O. Toye	Sean Hennen	November 15, 2012	2J7207	14.57
31	8	"'Til Death"	Helen Shaver	Amanda Segel	November 29, 2012	2J7208	14.43
32	9	"C.O.D."	Clark Johnson	Ray Utarnachitt	December 6, 2012	2J7209	14.18
33	10	"Shadow Box"	Stephen Surjik	Patrick Harbinson	December 13, 2012	2J7210	14.08
34	11	"2πR"	Richard J. Lewis	Dan Dietz	January 3, 2013	2J7211	16.23
35	12	"Prisoner's Dilemma"	Chris Fisher	David Slack	January 10, 2013	2J7212	15.67
36	13	"Dead Reckoning"	John Dahl	Erik Mountain	January 31, 2013	2J7213	15.71
37	14	"One Percent"	Chris Fisher	Denise Thé & Melissa Scrivner Love	February 7, 2013	2J7214	14.88
38	15	"Booked Solid"	Frederick E. O. Toye	Nic Van Zeebroeck & Michael Sopczynski	February 14, 2013	2J7215	14.87
39	16	"Relevance"	Jonathan Nolan	Amanda Segel & Jonathan Nolan	February 21, 2013	2J7216	14.22
40	17	"Proteus"	Kenneth Fink	Sean Hennen	March 7, 2013	2J7217	14.57
41	18	"All In"	Tricia Brock	Lucas O'Connor	March 14, 2013	2J7218	14.34
42	19	"Trojan Horse"	Jeffrey Hunt	Dan Dietz & Erik Mountain	April 4, 2013	2J7219	14.57
43	20	"In Extremis"	Chris Fisher	Greg Plageman & Tony Camerino	April 25, 2013	2J7220	13.22
44	21	"Zero Day"	Jeffrey Hunt	Amanda Segel & David Slack	May 2, 2013	2J7221	12.96
45	22	"God Mode"	Richard J. Lewis	Patrick Harbinson & Jonathan Nolan	May 9, 2013	2J7222	13.16

=== Season 3 (2013–14) ===
No. overall	No. in season	Title	Directed by	Written by	Original release date	Prod. code	U.S. viewers (millions)
46	1	"Liberty"	Chris Fisher	Greg Plageman & Denise Thé	September 24, 2013	2J7601	12.44
47	2	"Nothing to Hide"	Frederick E. O. Toye	Erik Mountain	October 1, 2013	2J7602	12.35
48	3	"Lady Killer"	Omar Madha	Amanda Segel	October 8, 2013	2J7603	11.65
49	4	"Reasonable Doubt"	Stephen Williams	Melissa Scrivner Love	October 15, 2013	2J7604	12.69
50	5	"Razgovor" "Разговор"	Kenneth Fink	David Slack	October 22, 2013	2J7605	13.17
51	6	"Mors Praematura"	Helen Shaver	Dan Dietz	October 29, 2013	2J7606	12.00
52	7	"The Perfect Mark"	Stephen Surjik	Sean Hennen	November 5, 2013	2J7607	11.79
53	8	"Endgame"	Sylvain White	Nic Van Zeebroeck & Michael Sopczynski	November 12, 2013	2J7608	12.60
54	9	"The Crossing"	Frederick E. O. Toye	Denise Thé	November 19, 2013	2J7609	12.28
55	10	"The Devil's Share"	Chris Fisher	Amanda Segel & Jonathan Nolan	November 26, 2013	2J7610	11.89
56	11	"Lethe"	Richard J. Lewis	Erik Mountain	December 17, 2013	2J7611	12.40
57	12	"Aletheia"	Richard J. Lewis	Lucas O'Connor	January 7, 2014	2J7612	12.10
58	13	"4C"	Stephen Williams	Melissa Scrivner Love & Greg Plageman	January 14, 2014	2J7613	12.54
59	14	"Provenance"	Jeffrey Hunt	Sean Hennen	February 4, 2014	2J7614	12.35
60	15	"Last Call"	Jeff T. Thomas	Dan Dietz	February 25, 2014	2J7615	11.00
61	16	"RAM"	Stephen Surjik	Nic Van Zeebroeck & Michael Sopczynski	March 4, 2014	2J7616	10.64
62	17	"/" "Root Path"	Jeffrey Lee Gibson	David Slack	March 18, 2014	2J7617	10.94
63	18	"Allegiance"	Jeffrey Hunt	Tony Camerino	March 25, 2014	2J7618	12.23
64	19	"Most Likely To..."	Kevin Hooks	Melissa Scrivner Love & Denise Thé	April 1, 2014	2J7619	11.45
65	20	"Death Benefit"	Richard J. Lewis	Erik Mountain & Lucas O'Connor	April 15, 2014	2J7620	10.74
66	21	"Beta"	Frederick E. O. Toye	Sean Hennen & Dan Dietz	April 29, 2014	2J7621	11.31
67	22	"A House Divided"	Chris Fisher	Amanda Segel	May 6, 2014	2J7622	10.50
68	23	"Deus Ex Machina"	Chris Fisher	Greg Plageman & David Slack	May 13, 2014	2J7623	10.95

=== Season 4 (2014–15) ===
No. overall	No. in season	Title	Directed by	Written by	Original release date	Prod. code	U.S. viewers (millions)
69	1	"Panopticon"	Richard J. Lewis	Erik Mountain & Greg Plageman	September 23, 2014	3J5401	10.58
70	2	"Nautilus"	Chris Fisher	Dan Dietz & Melissa Scrivner Love	September 30, 2014	3J5402	10.72
71	3	"Wingman"	Frederick E.O. Toye	Amanda Segel	October 7, 2014	3J5403	9.64
72	4	"Brotherhood"	Chris Fisher	Denise Thé	October 14, 2014	3J5404	9.72
73	5	"Prophets"	Kenneth Fink	Lucas O'Connor	October 21, 2014	3J5405	9.40
74	6	"Pretenders"	Stephen Surjik	Ashley Gable	October 28, 2014	3J5406	9.72
75	7	"Honor Among Thieves"	Sylvain White	David Slack	November 11, 2014	3J5407	9.11
76	8	"Point of Origin"	Richard J. Lewis	Tony Camerino	November 18, 2014	3J5408	9.87
77	9	"The Devil You Know"	Richard J. Lewis	Erik Mountain	November 25, 2014	3J5409	9.04
78	10	"The Cold War"	Michael Offer	Amanda Segel	December 16, 2014	3J5410	8.94
79	11	"If-Then-Else"	Chris Fisher	Denise Thé	January 6, 2015	3J5411	10.08
80	12	"Control-Alt-Delete"	Stephen Surjik	Andy Callahan	January 13, 2015	3J5412	10.16
81	13	"M.I.A."	Kevin Bray	Lucas O'Connor	February 3, 2015	3J5413	9.28
82	14	"Guilty"	Kate Woods	David Slack	February 10, 2015	3J5414	9.53
83	15	"Q&A"	Stephen Semel	Dan Dietz	February 17, 2015	3J5415	9.17
84	16	"Blunt"	Frederick E.O. Toye	Amanda Segel & Greg Plageman	February 24, 2015	3J5416	9.63
85	17	"Karma"	Chris Fisher	Hillary Benefiel & Sabir Pirzada	March 10, 2015	3J5417	8.67
86	18	"Skip"	Helen Shaver	Ashley Gable	March 24, 2015	3J5418	9.15
87	19	"Search and Destroy"	Stephen Surjik	Zak Schwartz	April 7, 2015	3J5419	8.67
88	20	"Terra Incognita"	Alrick Riley	Erik Mountain & Melissa Scrivner Love	April 14, 2015	3J5420	9.21
89	21	"Asylum"	Frederick E.O. Toye	Andy Callahan & Denise Thé	April 28, 2015	3J5421	8.45
90	22	"YHWH"	Chris Fisher	Dan Dietz & Greg Plageman	May 5, 2015	3J5422	8.18

=== Season 5 (2016) ===
No. overall	No. in season	Title	Directed by	Written by	Original release date	Prod. code	U.S. viewers (millions)
91	1	"B.S.O.D."	Chris Fisher	Greg Plageman & Tony Camerino	May 3, 2016	3J6001	7.35
92	2	"SNAFU"	Chris Fisher	Lucas O'Connor	May 9, 2016	3J6002	5.80
93	3	"Truth Be Told"	Stephen Surjik	Erik Mountain	May 10, 2016	3J6003	7.34
94	4	"6,741"	Chris Fisher	Lucas O'Connor & Denise Thé	May 16, 2016	3J6007	5.31
95	5	"ShotSeeker"	Maja Vrvilo	Andy Callahan	May 17, 2016	3J6004	6.97
96	6	"A More Perfect Union"	Alrick Riley	Melissa Scrivner Love	May 23, 2016	3J6005	5.49
97	7	"QSO"	Kate Woods	Hillary Benefiel	May 24, 2016	3J6006	5.33
98	8	"Reassortment"	Kenneth Fink	Tony Camerino	May 24, 2016	3J6008	4.92
99	9	"Sotto Voce"	Margot Lulick	Sabir Pirzada	May 30, 2016	3J6009	5.49
100	10	"The Day the World Went Away"	Frederick E.O. Toye	Andy Callahan & Melissa Scrivner Love	May 31, 2016	3J6010	6.66
101	11	"Synecdoche"	Tim Matheson	Jacey Heldrich & Joshua Brown	June 7, 2016	3J6011	6.36
102	12	".exe"	Greg Plageman	Greg Plageman & Erik Mountain	June 14, 2016	3J6012	6.27
103	13	"return 0"	Chris Fisher	Jonathan Nolan & Denise Thé	June 21, 2016	3J6013	6.51

== Ratings ==
Person of Interest : U.S. viewers per episode (millions)

Season	Episode number																							Average
Season	1	2	3	4	5	6	7	8	9	10	11	12	13	14	15	16	17	18	19	20	21	22	23	Average
1	13.33	12.51	11.57	12.04	12.42	11.62	11.76	11.65	12.66	12.93	14.86	14.40	15.10	15.14	13.16	14.56	15.67	14.59	13.69	12.73	13.27	12.96	13.47	13.31
2	14.28	14.58	13.93	14.03	13.66	14.87	14.57	14.43	14.18	14.08	16.23	15.67	15.71	14.88	14.87	14.22	14.57	14.34	14.57	13.22	12.96	13.16	–	14.41
3	12.44	12.35	11.65	12.69	13.17	12.00	11.79	12.60	12.28	11.89	12.40	12.10	12.54	12.35	11.00	10.64	10.94	12.23	11.45	10.74	11.31	10.50	10.95	11.83
4	10.58	10.72	9.64	9.72	9.40	9.72	9.11	9.87	9.04	8.94	10.08	10.16	9.28	9.53	9.17	9.63	8.67	9.15	8.67	9.21	8.45	8.18	–	9.42
5	7.35	5.80	7.34	5.31	6.97	5.49	5.33	4.92	5.49	6.66	6.36	6.27	6.51	–										6.14

Audience measurement performed by Nielsen Media Research

== Home media releases ==
Season	Episodes	DVD and Blu-ray release dates		
Season	Episodes	Region 1	Region 2	Region 4
1	23	September 4, 2012	March 18, 2013	November 7, 2012
2	22	September 3, 2013	June 16, 2014	October 16, 2013
3	23	September 2, 2014	September 21, 2015	October 8, 2014
4	22	August 11, 2015	September 5, 2016	September 2, 2015
5	13	July 19, 2016	September 11, 2017	February 1, 2017
Complete Series	103	July 19, 2016	September 11, 2017	February 1, 2017
