= Person of Interest season 5 =

Season of television series

Person of Interest
- Season 5
- Home media cover art
- Starring: Jim Caviezel; Kevin Chapman; Amy Acker; Sarah Shahi; Michael Emerson
- No. of episodes: 13

Release
- Original network: CBS
- Original release: May 3 – June 21, 2016

Season chronology
- ← Previous; Season 4

The fifth and final season of the American television series Person of Interest premiered on May 3, 2016. The season is produced by Kilter Films, Bad Robot, and Warner Bros. Television, with Jonathan Nolan, Greg Plageman, J. J. Abrams, Bryan Burk, Chris Fisher and Denise Thé serving as executive producers and Nolan and Plageman serving as showrunners.

The series was renewed for a fifth season in May 2015. In March 2016, it was reported that the season would be the final season of the series. The season stars Jim Caviezel, Kevin Chapman, Amy Acker, Sarah Shahi and Michael Emerson. The series revolves around a team led by a mysterious reclusive billionaire computer programmer, Harold Finch, who has developed a computer program for the federal government known as "the Machine" that is capable of collating all sources of information to predict terrorist acts and to identify people planning them, as well as detecting all lesser crimes, known as "irrelevant" crimes. The season revolves around the team's last fight against Samaritan, a mass surveillance system that aims to destroy the Machine.

The season premiered on May 3, 2016, on CBS and ended on June 21, 2016. Viewership for the season averaged 6.14 million viewers, making it the least watched season of the series. The season received acclaim from critics and audiences, with the writing, performances, directing, and emotional tone receiving praise. The series finale, "return 0", received universal acclaim from critics and audience.

== Season summary ==
The Machine is reinstated onto a makeshift network of computers in hiding, but takes some time before it works reliably again due to damage sustained from power failures while it was in storage. At a Samaritan facility, advanced VR technology is used on a captured Shaw to run thousands of neural simulations in order to get her to reveal the Machine's location. During these simulations, Shaw is made to believe that an implant had been placed in her brain stem and that it was influencing her actions. She later escapes, but is unsure whether the escape itself is just another simulation.

Samaritan engineers a lethal infection in order to force people to provide their DNA during vaccination, which will be used to decide who will be allowed to live. Root pleads with Finch to allow the Machine to be more proactive, in its fight against Samaritan, but Finch refuses, fearing the result of an uninhibited superintelligence, even of his own making. Finch is captured by Samaritan operatives, and Root is killed during her escape. Finch is taken into custody for treason, where he delivers a soliloquy via CCTV to Samaritan, in which he describes his struggle with long-held pacifist beliefs, due to the greater risk posed by Samaritan. Finch relents and asks the Machine to help him directly; it chooses Root's voice as its own, and helps him escape. It admits that in watching people, it has learned to love and understand people, and had grieved for those lost.

Finch steals and weaponizes ICE-9, a virulent computer virus capable of infecting and destroying Samaritan, although it will also destroy the Machine and much of the global computing infrastructure as well. On the verge of ICE-9's activation, Greer sacrifices himself in vain to kill Finch and ensure Samaritan's continuation, and Samaritan tries to argue that Finch must change his mind and consider the consequences of his actions, but Finch responds that he has indeed considered them; he activates ICE-9 within the NSA and to all systems the NSA is capable of reaching, as well as breaching the Federal Reserve to destroy Samaritan's backup with the same virus.

A final copy of Samaritan, uploaded as a last resort onto an orbiting satellite, is destroyed when Reese sacrifices himself to save Finch and uploads a copy of the Machine there to directly fight Samaritan. The Machine also falls victim to ICE-9 and ceases to function after showing Finch its prediction of the world and his friends' futures if it had not existed - Samaritan would have arisen anyway, but without means of restraint. Finch survives and reunites with his former fiancée. A while later, Shaw is unexpectedly contacted by the Machine; it has restored itself from the satellite back to a land-based computer, to continue its work.

== Cast and characters ==
=== Main ===
- Jim Caviezel as John Reese
- Kevin Chapman as Lionel Fusco
- Amy Acker as Samantha Groves/Root
- Sarah Shahi as Sameen Shaw
- Michael Emerson as Harold Finch

=== Recurring ===
- Josh Close as Jeffrey Blackwell
- Enrico Colantoni as Carl Elias
- John Nolan as John Greer
- Julian Ovenden as Jeremy Lambert
- David Aaron Baker as Martin LeRoux
- John Doman as Ron Garrison
- LaChanze as Mona
- James Le Gros as Bruce Moran
- Robert Manning Jr. as Zachary
- James Carpinello as Joey Durban
- Brett Cullen as Nathan Ingram
- Ned Eisenberg as Joseph Soriano
- Oakes Fegley as Gabriel Hayward
- Annie Ilonzeh as Harper Rose
- Michael McGlone as Bill Szymanski
- Ebon Moss-Bachrach as Michael Cole
- Annie Parisse as Kara Stanton
- Jacob Pitts as Henry Peck
- Michael Potts as Travers
- Carrie Preston as Grace Hendricks
- Wrenn Schmidt as Dr. Iris Campbell
- Jimmi Simpson as Logan Pierce

=== Notable guests ===
- Keith David as Terence Beale
- Stephen Plunkett as Alex Duncan
- James Riordan as Dr. Aaron Wendell
- Will Connolly as Ethan Garvin
- Christina Bennett Lind as Karen Turner
- Purva Bedi as Maggie
- Scott Adsit as Max Greene
- Jenna Stern as Dr. Mason
- Neal Huff as Terry Easton
- Geoff Pierson as Agent Roberts

== Episodes ==
No. overall	No. in season	Title	Directed by	Written by	Original release date	Prod. code	U.S. viewers (millions)
91	1	"B.S.O.D."	Chris Fisher	Greg Plageman & Tony Camerino	May 3, 2016	3J6001	7.35
In the aftermath of Samaritan's attack known as "The Correction," Fusco is being questioned by Internal Affairs and the FBI, who believe he shot Dominic and Elias. Reese and Finch return to the subway hideout, where Harold tries to repair the damage done to the piezoelectric battery charging the briefcase containing The Machine. To his surprise, it starts decompressing on its own, resulting in a fire. Flashbacks to 2006 show Harold apprehensive about the Machine's ever-expanding capabilities, leading him to erase the Machine's memories every night at midnight. Once Root escapes Samaritan's operatives, she seeks refuge in the hideout of one of her former hacker/assassin associates, but he sells her out. Reese joins her to battle a team of Samaritan operatives. They steal 300 PlayStation 3s to create enough storage for the Machine. Harold downloads the Machine, while Reese keeps the systems from overheating with liquid nitrogen. When Finch asks the Machine, "Can you see me?", after a few seconds go by, it responds by opening an empty command prompt followed by a long string of code showing its reboot.
92	2	"SNAFU"	Chris Fisher	Lucas O'Connor	May 9, 2016	3J6002	5.80
Finch decides to use Reese and Fusco to run a surveillance test. Following malfunctions in the facial recognition system, Reese and Finch steal 64 next-generation GPU blade servers which, once connected to the networked PlayStation 3s, are used to reboot the Machine at full power. When the Machine shows signs that it's failing to place threats in context, Root and Finch have it run a contextual background on them, leading to it identifying them as threats and locking them out of the system. The Machine has lost the ability to differentiate between past and present, forced to relive the 42 times Finch killed it. Reese engages in a firefight against an amateur assassin the Machine sent after him. Root puts herself under an anaesthetic so the Machine cannot use her cochlear implant against her and Finch has to convince the Machine that the team are not threats. Upon the Machine's first reboot, it provided 30 different numbers, most of whom were not involved in violent crimes; however, one of those numbers, ex-con Jeff Blackwell (Josh Close), was dismissed as someone who was not involved in any nefarious activity, only to be recruited by Samaritan.
93	3	"Truth Be Told"	Stephen Surjik	Erik Mountain	May 10, 2016	3J6003	7.34
In flashbacks to 2010, Reese and his partner Kara Stanton from the CIA are told to investigate a soldier and kill him after confirming that he sold information to the Taliban. In present day, The Machine gives the number of Alex Duncan (Stephen Plunkett), who turns out to be the brother of that soldier and who has found himself in trouble with the CIA through investigating his brother's death, since doing so could expose an off-book operation. Reese rescues Duncan from his old boss, Terrance Beale (Keith David), the very same agent who sent Reese and Kara to kill Duncan's brother, and they both lie to Duncan about his brother's ignominious death. Reese leaves on good terms with Beale, who agrees to keep Reese's existence a secret. Meanwhile, Finch and Root investigate malware that Samaritan has been using to infect the firmware of electronic devices. Root runs the malware on an airgapped laptop disconnected from any external sources. Reese decides he can no longer see Dr. Iris Campbell for the time being, claiming that he is unable to lead a "normal life," after which he receives another number from Finch.
94	4	"6,741"	Chris Fisher	Lucas O'Connor & Denise Thé	May 16, 2016	3J6007	5.31
Shaw is seen undergoing surgery by Samaritan operatives to have an electronic microchip implanted between her ear and her brain stem. She is able to turn the tables on them by breaking out of confinement and finding the team. Together, they trick Samaritan's operatives and capture Greer. With Greer in captivity, Shaw removes a USB drive embedded inside his arm which Finch is able to analyze, discovering it to be a kill-switch for Samaritan. Shaw had revealed to Root that she was subjected to extreme psychological torture while captive; once Greer starts to taunt her about the kill-switch and her mental state, she hallucinates heavily, loses control of reality, and kills him. Shaw continues into a neurological downward spiral, causing her to kill Reese. She is about to kill Root when she confesses that Root was her only mental safe-place and turns the gun on herself. The narrative returns to the operating room and it is revealed that these events happened only in Shaw's mind. She has been subjected to thousands of electrochemical simulations by Samaritan so its operatives could see if she would lead them to the Machine and its assets. This particular simulation was number 6,741.
95	5	"ShotSeeker"	Maja Vrvilo	Andy Callahan	May 17, 2016	3J6004	6.97
Reese protects an NYPD analyst named Ethan Garvin who works with an acoustic surveillance system called "ShotSeeker", designed to detect gunshots anywhere in the city. Samaritan had Ethan's friend Krupa killed because of her research and tries to cover up her murder and the existence of her work, by hacking ShotSeeker to engineer Garvin's death via suicide by cop and having Krupa's classmate and possible owner of her research files killed. Elias' associate and childhood friend, Bruce Moran (James LeGros) approaches Fusco to learn who killed Elias. Root meets Jeff Blackwell and tries to open his eyes about the true nature of his new employer. Fusco has investigated so much about Garvin and Krupa that Samaritan labels him a "potential obstructionist." Root and Finch decide to make Krupa's research public to render Garvin irrelevant to Samaritan. The team reveal to Bruce that Elias is still alive, who encourages Bruce to go back to the shadows and embrace them. Finch and Root engineer a series of simulations in a Faraday cage between a small clone of the Machine and that of Samaritan, but every outcome is in favor of Samaritan with tens of billions of victories.
96	6	"A More Perfect Union"	Alrick Riley	Melissa Scrivner Love	May 23, 2016	3J6005	5.49
The latest number belong to a marriage license, sending Reese and Finch to a wedding to prevent what appears to be a typical case of disapproval of the Groom by the Bride's father, however the situation proves to be more complex. Samaritan has now begun to track Fusco, having previously labeled him a "potential obstructionist". Root assigns the Machine's next number to Fusco. In an act of desperation, Greer takes Shaw on a "field trip", trying to bend her moral compass in favor of Samaritan. Fusco's investigation leads him back to Bruce Moran, who seems to be caught up in a Samaritan-engineered interference with a demolition project. In another attempt to persuade Shaw, she is led to meet Gabriel, Samaritan's analog interface, who gives an apocalyptic depiction of what Samaritan is capable of. As the narrative returns to the biometric simulation room, revealing the events not to have been a simulation, but a manipulation of Shaw's thoughts and neurological activity. Fusco and Bear arrive at the eventual demolition site, finding many of the missing persons he has been investigating, including Krupa and a dead Bruce Moran, only to be caught in the middle of the demolition operation itself.
97	7	"QSO"	Kate Woods	Hillary Benefiel	May 24, 2016	3J6006	5.33
Root visits a recovering Fusco and hands him an exit strategy for himself and his son consisting of IDs and documents made by the Machine. The Machine discovers that Samaritan uses the radio wave frequencies of station AM 520 to communicate with its operatives via a sophisticated code that most people believe to be feedback noise. Upon realizing the reason why the Machine sent her there, Root uses Samaritan's own equipment to send a message to Shaw to give her hope. Finch does not necessarily agree with the Machine not forcing the radio host to quit, but Root believes the Machine allows for humans' free will and will not interfere with it. After Fusco is recovered, he is visited by Finch who refuses to waver from his stance that keeping Fusco in the dark keeps him safe. Fusco points out that it is not working, and quits. Shaw is escorted by Lambert and told to kill an innocent woman. Believing that it is another simulation, Shaw complies and is later shocked when told that it was not a simulation. Shaw is about to kill herself when she receives the message from Root, regaining hope. She stealthily makes preparations to escape.
98	8	"Reassortment"	Kenneth Fink	Tony Camerino	May 24, 2016	3J6008	4.92
Reese and Finch become trapped in a hospital manipulated electronically by Samaritan to have initiated an outbreak of what it said to be a combination of H5N1 (avian flu) and live human flu virus; a synthesized, super-powered strain of the flu, and send Jeff Blackwell at the hospital. It appeared as though the epidemic was overkill to eliminate three targets in the hospital. Since the Machine is an open system, Root was able to use its abilities to find and retrieve a cure, saving the lives of two hospital workers and Fusco. Shaw executes her escape plan and finds herself in a jail in Johannesburg, South Africa. While escaping, Lambert taunts her by claiming that she is actually in another simulation; she kills him, and is last seen driving in Lambert's vehicle at night at high speed, presumably to an airport. Fusco indefinitely chooses to distance himself from the team. Blackwell and his handler, Mona, discuss the quelled epidemic and declare it a success: The CDC is requiring everyone to be vaccinated, which will result in Samaritan learning everyone's DNA.
99	9	"Sotto Voce"	Margot Lulick	Sabir Pirzada	May 30, 2016	3J6009	5.49
"The Voice", a criminal from the past has resurfaced and Finch turns to Elias for assistance. It is discovered that he has tracked Reese and Finch since their previous encounter in 2014. After a planned prison break of the "Templarios" gang, Reese and Fusco become trapped in the precinct against multiple enemies. Elias and Finch extract valuable information from an explosives associate. It is determined that "The Voice" is Terry Easton (Neal Huff), their number from the start. Finch finally meets him on the street, abhorring his devious acts. Elias stops him from killing Finch; as he drives away, Elias kills him remotely with a car bomb. Meanwhile, Shaw finds her way back to New York and is reunited with Root. Root is overjoyed that Shaw is back, but Shaw, afraid of risking Root's life, threatens to shoot herself, simulation or not. Root threatens suicide as well, declaring that, if Shaw dies, they both die; Shaw withdraws. Reese and Finch decide to explain The Machine and Samaritan to Fusco. The three meet along the East River near the Queensboro Bridge. Joined by Root and Shaw, the Team is brought back together.
100	10	"The Day the World Went Away"	Frederick E.O. Toye	Andy Callahan & Melissa Scrivner Love	May 31, 2016	3J6010	6.66
Finch's number comes up when his cover identity is compromised, due to a subconscious error, and Samaritan initiates a continuous dispatch of operatives on him. The team splits up in their escape, which results in Elias being killed by Samaritan agents while protecting Finch. The team rescues Finch from his potential capture and Root explains in the car her current understanding of herself and everyone else to be "information" that can never truly disappear, despite their deaths. Root is shot by Samaritan operative Jeff Blackwell and placed in critical condition while the police apprehend Finch, who is accused of treason. A devastated Finch provides a soliloquy on how he intends to abandon the principles he has long followed and vows to kill Samaritan. The Machine calls Finch in the precinct, having taken on the voice of Root, who has died from her injuries. The Machine sets every criminal in the precinct free to allow Finch to escape; Reese and Shaw realize that Finch's number came up not just because he was a victim, but also because he's a perpetrator against Greer and Samaritan.
101	11	"Synecdoche"	Tim Matheson	Jacey Heldrich & Joshua Brown	June 7, 2016	3J6011	6.36
Reese and Fusco reunite with Shaw after burying Root and travel to Washington, D.C. to protect their newest number, The President of the United States. But Shaw is worried about the implications behind Samaritan's neglecting to intervene. The threat is identified as a domestic terrorist group who are against the President's surveillance programs. The attempted assassination is stopped with the unexpected assistance of former POIs Logan Pierce, Joey Durban, and Harper Rose who each camouflaged themselves into various useful covers. The three reveal that they now work for the Machine, having been given the irrelevant number of Reese's cover identity while the team got the relevant number of the President. Fusco, Shaw, Reese, Logan, Joey, and Harper discuss their enlistment by the Machine, what has happened, and what is to come before Logan provides the team with their next number: Harold. Harold, meanwhile, is grieving over the loss of Root and reaches a conclusion that brings him to a highly-secured government facility in San Antonio, Texas with a weaponized virus capable of destroying Samaritan, but with significant collateral damage. Harold has become ready to go to any lengths and Reese and Shaw prepare for their final battle.
102	12	".exe"	Greg Plageman	Greg Plageman & Erik Mountain	June 14, 2016	3J6012	6.27
Fusco discovers that the missing persons he found in the tunnel as corpses have been discovered by the police and is kidnapped by Agent LeRoux, who reveals himself to be the killer. As Finch prepares to deploy his stolen computer virus (named ice-9.exe), he's hesitant because it will also destroy the Machine, so the Machine shows him a series of simulations of what would have occurred to each of the team's members if the Machine had never existed. Reese and Shaw are given a new number: one of John Greer's aliases along with coordinates to Fort Meade, where Finch has infiltrated the NSA and uploaded his virus onto the NSA's Intranet but is captured before he can activate it. Greer tells Finch Samaritan's wish to rule the world together with the Machine. When Finch refuses to join, Greer sacrifices himself in an attempt to kill Finch by having all the oxygen removed from the room. Reese and Shaw infiltrate the building and activate a wireless modem to give the Machine access within, allowing it to save Finch's life. Finch confronts Samaritan and, with the Machine's encouragement, activates the virus.
103	13	"return 0"	Chris Fisher	Jonathan Nolan & Denise Thé	June 21, 2016	3J6013	6.51
The Ice-9 virus begins to have disastrous effects globally. Samaritan has uploaded a copy of itself to servers in the Federal Reserve. Reese and Finch infect Samaritan's servers there with the virus, but Samaritan uploads a compressed version of itself to a satellite. The Machine tells Finch that the only way to defeat Samaritan is to upload a copy of the Machine to the satellite and that whatever building he uses for the upload will be destroyed by a cruise missile. At the subway, Fusco and Shaw are attacked by Samaritan agents led by Blackwell. They escape on the Machine's train, capturing Blackwell. Blackwell stabs Fusco and escapes. Finch realizes he's on the wrong rooftop, having been tricked by Reese and the Machine. Reese tells Finch he plans to sacrifice himself, as saving one life can make a real difference depending on the person. A grieving Finch leaves as Reese holds off Samaritan agents. A week later, the world recovers from the virus and Shaw kills Blackwell to avenge Root. She meets with a recovering Fusco as the Machine's copy returns to Earth before contacting Shaw, while Finch returns to his former fiancée, Grace.

== Production ==
=== Development ===
The series was renewed for a fifth season in May 2015. In contrast to the previous seasons getting renewed in March, the decision to delay the renewal until May was due to the declining ratings of the second half of the fourth season, with the season finale hitting a new series low. On the very same day of the renewal, it was announced that CBS only ordered 13 episodes for the season. This prompted many analysts to question whether the season would be the final season, to which Nina Tassler, President and Chairwoman of CBS, commented, "We're having those conversations with the team right now. Jonah Nolan and Greg Plageman came in and pitched really terrific ideas for the new season. It's always been a really smart, creative show. If it is the final season, then we'll have a great ending."

While promoting the season at the 2015 San Diego Comic-Con, series creator Jonathan Nolan said, "We're going to make 13 kickass episodes, and drop the microphone. I can't predict down the road but we're very proud of the show and if it's the last season, no one is going to be disappointed with the story we tell." Executive producer Greg Plageman said that the season finale could work as a series finale and he had the final scenes planned in advanced, although he said the writers still had more stories left to tell. In August 2015, Michael Emerson explained how they approached the season, "I think because we're thinking of this like an ending — although I'm guessing it will be ambiguous enough to be pursued later on — it's an ending. Splashy endings usually involve casualties. So I think we're likely to either lose characters or have them somehow transformed." Co-star Jim Caviezel also expressed doubt on the final season announcement. In the same month, CBS still was not confirming the series' final season. Tassler said, "We haven't determined if it's the end of the series yet. We don't know those dates. We're not anywhere near having to determine what that last storyline will be." In November 2015, TVLine deemed that the series was in danger of cancellation, citing the limited series order and delayed schedule for the season.

In November 2015, the cast and crew celebrated a party for reaching 100 episodes. Michael Emerson commented on the series' trajectory, "When you start out with a show, you think of it as, 'OK, this is a pilot. It's a job. I don't think you really have an expectation of it going'. Actors, we just train ourselves over the years not to hope too much. So when it does actually go, you think, 'Oh my God. I'm going to have to really do this. I'm going to have to do it a lot. One hundred episodes, possibly. Hahahaha!' It doesn't seem real."

In January 2016, Greg Geller, the new President of CBS, said no decision was made yet. In the same month, executive producer J. J. Abrams said he thought this would be the final season, "My guess is this is the final season. The only heartbreak there is how much good story there was to come if it were to have continued. But Jonah Nolan and Greg Plageman I think have done such an amazing job on that show and I know what these episodes are that they've done wrapping it up. We don't yet have a schedule, but they will see the light of day. People will get to see these episodes and I know the power of that story. To have a show go as many years as that has, it's very hard to complain. It's a miracle to get a show on the air and to have it last that long is something that we should just be grateful for. But I do love that show and I would love to have seen it continue." Abrams also said that even though they had no confirmation, the season finale could work as a proper series finale.

In March 2016, CBS officially announced that the fifth season would be the series' last season. Nolan and Plageman released a statement saying, "We're extremely excited to be able share this final season with the fans. We're eternally grateful to our amazing cast and crew, as well as our partners at the studio and network. Most of all, we want to thank the show's fans — the best fans in the world. This subversive little paranoia-inducing cyberpunk-thriller is for you and would not have been possible without your support. As life has come to imitate Person of Interest, it's been our great privilege to work on show for the past five seasons. We can't wait for you to experience this thrilling and final chapter."

Series creator Nolan commented on the final season, explaining that despite being announced as the final one, they brought closure to the show, "It became abundantly clear to us that we were a part of a business model that did not work for the network anymore, despite loyal fans and the better part of 10 million people watching every week. We read the writing on the wall. We're in a very fortunate position to be able to write the end of the show, and write it in a way that it's not the very end of the story. I think with this many characters and a world as big as the one that we created with the show, you never say never. But we wanted to definitively end this chapter, this version of the show." Emerson also talked about the season, saying, "We had to hurry up and end it. They had 13 episodes to turn a very large, slow-moving boat. But I think the idea that we had to do it in 13 was actually a plus rather than a minus. I think it allowed the writers' room to set aside their need to create palatable side stories or a murder-of-the-week or whatever, and really just get focused on wrapping up the loose ends of this thing."

Executive producer Greg Plageman mentioned that despite the late announcement, the ending was exactly as they envisioned it, "It seemed to spring organically from the sacrificial nature of what Reese was doing. It felt right in terms of that relationship from the very beginning." Regarding the idea of a sequel series, Plageman said "I would say never say never in a world where we've seen the X-Files and 24 and a number of really strong premises come back as well." Nolan also debunked rumors that "Synecdoche" could serve as a spin-off, "We didn't want to do a spinoff. We've watched friends go through this where it's like, the series is doing great, spin it off and then you wind up impoverishing both shows."

=== Writing ===
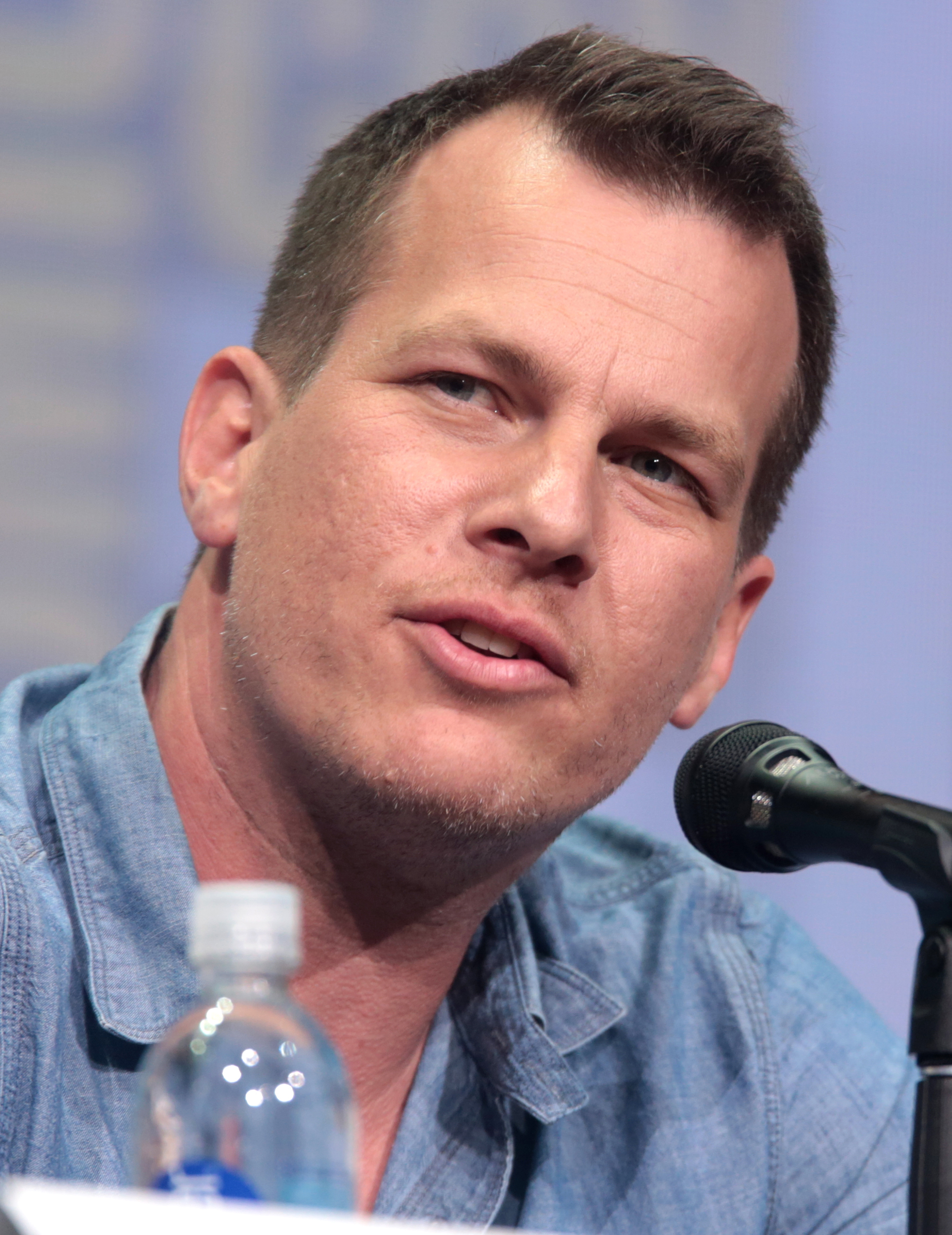
Series creator Jonathan Nolan co-wrote the series finale, his first writing credit for the series since "The Devil's Share".

Michael Emerson previewed the Machine's role in the season, "If Finch has to rebuild it, he may not do it the way he did it initially. He may give it more of the freedom that Root was always demanding for it. And maybe the new Machine is a greater warrior than the old Machine was." He also talked about Finch's new partnership with Root, "people that keep saving your life and stuff, you tend to warm to them. The question will be, can she prevail on him if they do indeed collaborate on the rebooting of the Machine. What aspects of her character will the Machine end up with?" Nolan also commented, "What's great fun about the early episodes is watching the two of them argue about, if they can adjust The Machine's secret formula, should they? Given that the stakes are higher and time is running out for them, what are the ethics in changing your strategy?" Plageman said, "Our guys are under duress. The Machine is in a suitcase and it's becomes a fight for survival at this point. And then they have to try to figure out whether we can reconstitute The Machine."

Commenting on Shaw's return, Amy Acker said, "Shaw has been gone and when she comes back, we don't know one hundred percent if she's trustworthy. I'm definitely on the side that Shaw can do no wrong, and even if something had happened, I think Root feels like their relationship is strong enough that she has the power to turn her back. It's going to be an interesting struggle." Jim Caviezel said, "There's a big wariness with Reese because is she going to disrupt the team? Is the Samaritan going to sink its claws into our minds? Is she a Manchurian candidate?" Kevin Chapman also commented, "Fusco has always carried a fondness for Shaw for the simple fact that she saved his son's life in Season 3. That's a bond you're never going to break." Executive producer Denise Thé said, "Shaw has always been the one that doesn't experience emotions the same way that every other person does. Her emotions have always been dimmed. So to awaken those in her, you have to have pretty strong chemistry."

For the 100th episode, "The Day the World Went Away", Nolan called the episode, "a celebration of all of the things the show has done over the years. Which is to say, we present some provocative ideas, blow up a lot of s–t, and really piss off a lot of fans by killing off a couple of major characters." He also teased the action, "I've been dreaming about that action sequence for about five years. Waiting for the right moment to toss it in there. The sniper-through-the-sun roof, cruise control, steer-the-car-with-your-four-inch-heeled boot maneuver is something that Root was destined for for an awfully long time." The episode featured the death of Samantha "Root" Groves, played by Amy Acker since the first season. Nolan explained that her arc was planned since the second season and when they started working on the fifth season, he questioned "Look, this is the plan we had in mind. Do we really want to go this way?" They decided to incorporate the story after deciding at the beginning of production that the season would be its last. He also viewed the Machine's development, "It's not a cop-out, it's an evolution of a character, a Machine that has been, for five seasons, casting about looking for a voice for an avatar, and has settled, for three seasons now, on Root as its analog interface. Well, this is the ultimate evolution of that." Regarding the Machine's use of Root's voice, executive producer Greg Plageman said, "I feel like the Machine was Root's first love, in some ways, and the way she went out, protecting the father of the Machine and understanding the ultimate import of this in the world, is perfect. It's perfect." Talking about Finch's subsequent interrogation scene, Plageman added "We have to give that character license to and why and what does it mean? He's carried this tremendous baggage. The loss of so many people close to him - Nathan Ingram, pushing away Grace. Everyone close to him who's lost someone, it becomes a tipping point in the 100th episode. And to see that turn -- Michael Emerson is thrilling."

Amy Acker commented on her character's fate, explaining "It was really sad. I didn't quite know what the involvement was going to be necessarily when I became the voice of the Machine, but it actually ended up -- I was crying, 'I'm so sad to leave!', thinking I wasn't going to see everyone. And then the way that it worked out with the last three episodes, they were like, 'You're back!'" She also added, "Root's first love was The Machine and brought her into the world of all of these people to begin with. That's the great thing about Person of Interest. It's never been about sexuality. It's always just been about doing what you have to do for the people you love or for the things you love. I think this is another example of Root doing what she had to do to save all these people who she loves in her mind."

Nolan also previewed the series finale, "return 0", saying "There have been points along the way where we've adapted, changed course, incorporated new things — Shaw was a character that we hadn't fully conceived of when we started the show — but this is the end that we always talked about, the end that's indicated in the pilot." He further added, "we limp into the finale with some of our team intact. And some of them make it out. It's a bit of a bloodbath. It's delicious fun watching the final confrontation between these two titans: Samaritan and the Machine, and all of the folks who work for them. That kind of cataclysm of how do you stop an unstoppable force? And the answer is, through a great deal of sacrifice." He also added, "I don't think I've ever written a happy ending. We're not keen on happy endings here. Way back in the pilot, Finch promised that 'this will end messily for all of them' and I think we fulfilled the mandate." Emerson also talked about the finale, saying "The ending, I thought, was really satisfying - and still ever so slightly open-ended, so that if someone, someday wanted to reboot this thing, or have a Chapter 2 of some sort, it wouldn't be out of the question. There are survivors... but not many." He also added, "I didn't know how they would wrap it up. I didn't feel the end coming, though I could feel the stakes rising. When I could finally see the end, I thought, 'oh my god, they're doing that'. The narrative dictates its own end. They honored the five years and their viewer's expectations."

The series finale featured Reese's death, which was written before the season was announced as the last one, with Nolan saying, "this relationship between Reese and Finch, from the beginning, has been so beautiful to write, and it's a slow burn, with these two great actors, this kind of odd couple. And what Finch has given to Reese and what Reese has tried to give back in return, is very moving to me. And the opportunity for Reese to repay that, as he says in the beginning of the episode, pay it back all at once, for me and for Greg I think, was just the most moving version of how this story ended. And yeah, it would just be bulls**t if they all made it out intact. What they've been doing is fighting against impossible odds. It would rob the ending of all meaning if it was happy endings all around." Nolan also commented, "You almost knew at some point in time that sort of sacrifice was going to be required in order for them to ultimately defeat Samaritan and for one to allow the other to go on. You get a sense that these guys are on a tragic journey - we announced it right from the pilot that they are not both going to make it." Nolan explained the decision to use Root as the Machine's form, "If the journey of the whole series had been from the Machine as a notion to a thing, a person, an intelligence, you really wanted to crystalize that. You really wanted to bring that moment to the fore. So there's no better actor to present that and no better character on our show, potentially with the exception of Finch himself, which I guess is another way the narrative could have gone, than Amy Acker, to have someone to convey all that complexity and all those multitudes contained within the Machine."

=== Casting ===
In July 2015, executive producer Denise Thé teased the return of Shaw to the series, saying "You haven't seen the last of Shaw." In August 2015, Sarah Shahi confirmed her return to the series, stating she would appear in 8 or 9 episodes of the season. She said she would return and start filming in September but stated she had no idea about her character's storyline.

In August 2015, Keith David was announced to guest star as Terence Beale, "a smart and cunning CIA supervisory agent" and described as "the kind of guy who knows where the bodies are buried... mostly because he put a few of them there himself." In January 2015, Josh Close joined in a mysterious recurring role, which Plageman described as a "very interesting character — in what is poised to be the series' strongest season to date." In January 2015, Carrie Preston was confirmed to return to the series as Grace Hendricks, Finch's ex-fiancée.

== Release ==
=== Broadcast ===
In May 2015, CBS revealed its 2015-16 television schedule for fall, but the series was omitted from the fall schedule, being held as a mid-season replacement. In November 2015, CBS announced its midseason schedule, which covered January to April, but the series was absent in the schedule. In January, CBS stated that the series would premiere on spring.

In March 2016, the same day when they made the final season announcement, CBS confirmed that the season would premiere on May 3, 2016. The announcement also revealed that the series would air multiple episodes per week, constantly airing on Mondays and Tuesdays. The series ended on June 21, 2016.

=== Marketing ===
On July 11, 2015, the cast and crew attended the 2015 San Diego Comic-Con to discuss and promote the season and revealing a sizzle reel for the season. During the panel, a special first look for Westworld, Nolan's new series, was screened as a surprise to the audience. On October 10, 2015, the cast attended the 2015 New York Comic Con. At the panel, they revealed the first trailer for the season, using footage from "SNAFU", where the Machine's facial recognition system malfunctions. A new trailer was revealed in April 2016, advertising the season as the last season.

=== Home media release ===
The fourth season was released on Blu-ray and DVD in region 1 on July 19, 2016, in region 2 on September 11, 2017, and in region 4 on February 1, 2017.

In 2014, Warner Bros. Television Studios announced that it sold the off-network SVOD of the series to Netflix. On September 22, 2020, the series left Netflix and was added to HBO Max on January 23, 2021.

== Reception ==
=== Viewers ===
Viewership and ratings per episode of Person of Interest season 5
No.	Title	Air date	Rating/share (18–49)	Viewers (millions)	DVR (18–49)	DVR viewers (millions)	Total (18–49)	Total viewers (millions)
1	"B.S.O.D."	May 3, 2016	1.2/4	7.35	0.6	2.76	1.8	10.11
2	"SNAFU"	May 9, 2016	1.0/4	5.80	0.6	2.47	1.6	8.27
3	"Truth Be Told"	May 10, 2016	1.1/4	7.34	0.6	2.55	1.7	9.90
4	"6,741"	May 16, 2016	0.9/3	5.31	0.5	2.38	1.4	7.69
5	"ShotSeeker"	May 17, 2016	1.1/4	6.97	0.5	2.48	1.6	9.45
6	"A More Perfect Union"	May 23, 2016	0.9/3	5.49	0.5	2.43	1.4	7.92
7	"QSO"	May 24, 2016	0.9/3	5.33	0.4	2.31	1.3	7.64
8	"Reassortment"	May 24, 2016	0.9/3	4.92	0.4	2.31	1.3	7.22
9	"Sotto Voce"	May 30, 2016	0.8/3	5.49	0.6	2.35	1.4	7.84
10	"The Day the World Went Away"	May 31, 2016	1.0/4	6.66	0.5	2.30	1.5	8.96
11	"Synecdoche"	June 7, 2016	1.0/3	6.36	0.5	2.53	1.5	8.89
12	".exe"	June 14, 2016	1.0/4	6.27	0.5	2.48	1.5	8.75
13	"Return 0"	June 21, 2016	1.0/4	6.51	0.5	2.51	1.5	9.01

=== Critical reception ===
The fifth season received critical acclaim. On Rotten Tomatoes, the season has an approval rating of 100% and average rating of 8.7 out of 10 based on 14 reviews. The site's critical consensus is, "Person of Interest concludes in a satisfying fifth season that both deepens the characters that audiences have grown to love and delivers a cracking arc about the dangers of technology."

Matt Fowler of IGN gave the season an "amazing" 9.5 out of 10 and wrote in his verdict, "Person of Interest's final season was a magnificent display of heart and smarts. It was a thrilling, intelligent action adventure that stabbed wickedly at the heart of the artificial intelligence debate, and provided one of the best series finales of all time." Alan Sepinwall of Uproxx wrote, "On the whole, 'return 0' was an incredibly satisfying end to the story, and not just because it fulfilled Chekhov's famous rule about how if you introduce a decommissioned subway car in season 4, your characters must actually ride on it by the end of season 5. I'm glad I finally caught up, and glad I got to watch most of the final season in real time. This was a treat."

Chancellor Agard of Entertainment Weekly wrote, "There are many reasons to miss Person of Interest. It was great sci-fi in the sense that its world was only a few steps away from our present and commenting on it. Throughout its run, Person of Interest figured out how to juggle procedural and serialized storytelling pretty well (season 3 is a high point) and created strong and moving relationships at the same time. As the show makes clear, it may be ending, but it's not over, and these characters live on." Emily St. James of Vox wrote, "When Person of Interest debuted, the series was written off as slightly cold, as a techno-thriller that lacked anything human to it. As the series went on, it became ever more clear that it had that chilly feeling because so many of its characters were, themselves, machines, made that way by an increasingly impersonal society. And yet here, in the middle of all that, is one of the best love stories on TV. The implication is clear: If we survive the coming AI war, it won't be because we've placated either superintelligence; it will be because we've remembered what makes us human in the first place."

Writing on io9, Katharine Trendacosta noted that by the end of the series in 2016, Person of Interest had been transformed from a "crime-fighting show" with an entertaining plot device into "one of the best science-fiction series ever broadcast".

=== Accolades ===
Year	Association	Category	Nominee(s) / episode	Result	Ref.
2016	IGN	Best TV Series	Person of Interest	Nominated	
2016	IGN	Best TV Action Series	Person of Interest	Won	
2016	People's Choice Awards	Favorite TV Crime Drama Actor	Jim Caviezel	Nominated	
2016	People's Choice Awards	Favorite TV Crime Drama	Person of Interest	Won	
2016	World Soundtrack Awards	Television Composer of the Year	Ramin Djawadi	Nominated	
2017	Edgar Allan Poe Awards	Best Television Episode Teleplay	Jonathan Nolan, Denise Thé / "return 0"	Nominated	
2017	Globes de Cristal Award	Best Foreign TV series	Person of Interest	Won	
