= 6,741 =

- Person of Interest episode
- Episode no.: Season 5 Episode 4
- Directed by: Chris Fisher
- Written by: Lucas O'Connor; Denise Thé
- Cinematography by: David Insley
- Editing by: Mark Conte
- Production code: 3J6007
- Original air date: May 16, 2016
- Running time: 43 minutes

Guest appearances
- John Nolan as John Greer; Julian Ovenden as Jeremy Lambert; James Riordan as Dr. Aaron Wendell

Episode chronology
← Previous "Truth Be Told"	Next → "ShotSeeker"

"6,741" is the 4th episode of the fifth season of the American television drama series Person of Interest. It is the 94th overall episode of the series and is written by Lucas O'Connor and executive producer Denise Thé and directed by executive producer Chris Fisher. It aired on CBS in the United States and on CTV in Canada on May 16, 2016.

The series revolves around a computer program for the federal government known as "The Machine" that is capable of collating all sources of information to predict terrorist acts and to identify people planning them. A team follows "irrelevant" crimes: lesser level of priority for the government. However, their security and safety is put in danger following the activation of a new program named Samaritan. In the episode, Shaw escapes from her captors in a hospital and reunites with the team. However, compulsions start to alter her perception of reality and the team sets to end Samaritan once and for all. Despite being credited, Kevin Chapman does not appear in the episode. Starting with this episode, Sarah Shahi is once again credited as main cast member.

According to Nielsen Media Research, the episode was seen by an estimated 5.31 million household viewers and gained a 0.9/3 ratings share among adults aged 18–49. The episode received universal acclaim from critics, who praised the writing, subverting tropes, acting (especially Sarah Shahi) and editing, and is considered one of the series' best episodes.

== Plot ==
Greer (John Nolan) watches as Shaw (Sarah Shahi) is undergoing a surgery where an electronic microchip is implanted between her ear and brain stem. However, Shaw resists the microchip's purpose and subdues her captors to escape the hospital. However, she realizes that the hospital is located on an island but manages to escape using a boat.

Arriving at New York, Shaw makes her way to a pharmacy and tries to remove the microchip, to no success and suffering convulsions. She then decides to fake a homicide attempt at the pharmacy so Samaritan can track her down. The agents arrive and Shaw subdues them until she runs out of bullets. The last Samaritan agent is then killed by Root (Amy Acker), who is astounded to see Shaw again. She and Reese (Jim Caviezel) take her to a subway train where they remove her microchip and then take her to Root's loft. After Reese and Finch (Michael Emerson) leave, Root and Shaw have sex. However, Shaw still suffers convulsions despite having the microchip removed although she doesn't tell Root.

Reese meets with Root at a diner and tells her that the microchip works as a placebo and starts questioning if Shaw could've been affected in any other way. Shaw overhears this as she planted a bug on Root and confronts them. She eventually decides to confront Samaritan at the diner and reveals her location on a phone. Samaritan sends two agents to retrieve her but they are subdued by Reese and Root. They then trace a phone call to Greer's location and capture him. Per Finch's instructions, they take Greer to a church to meet with Finch. Shaw tortures Greer and finds a USB flash drive in his body. Finch discovers that the drive works as a kill switch to Samaritan. Finch and Root leave to find a networked device while Reese stays with Shaw and Greer.

While Reese momentarily leaves to inspect the area, Shaw confronts Greer. Greer reveals that they allowed Shaw to escape as they "broke her" without the need of the microchip, allowed himself to be captured and it was her idea to use a drive, which will expose the team's location. Shaw suffers another convulsion and during this, she kills Greer by shooting him in the head. While going with Reese to warn Finch, Shaw has another compulsion and kills Reese. She meets with Root and confesses killing Reese. She is about to kill Root when she confesses that Root was her only mental safe-place and turns the gun on herself, killing herself.

However, it's revealed that all the events in the episode took place in Shaw's mind. She never escaped the hospital and has been subjected to thousands of electrochemical simulations by Samaritan so its operatives could see if she would lead them to the Machine and its assets. This particular simulation was number 6,741 and Greer gives the doctors orders to start the 6,742nd simulation.

== Production ==
=== Development ===
In October 2015, it was announced that the fourth episode of the season would be titled "6,741" and that it would be written by Lucas O'Connor and Denise Thé with Chris Fisher serving as director. Despite being the seventh episode produced for the season, it was the fourth to air.

=== Writing ===
Series creator Jonathan Nolan viewed the episode as a spiritual successor to "If-Then-Else", saying ""It was definitely meant to be a companion piece, in a sense, to 'If-Then-Else' thematically. In 'If-Then-Else,' you see the Machine's simulations of realities. And in '6,741,' you see Samaritan's take on that." Regarding Shaw's relationship with Root, executive producer Greg Plageman said ""We wanted something where we see that the attraction between these two characters has become undeniable this season. On both ends. And I think we deal with that in a really responsible manner. One that's very satisfying for our audience. We don't shy from it. Not just in this episode where she comes back, but in subsequent episodes was well."

== Reception ==
=== Viewers ===
In its original American broadcast, "6,741" was seen by an estimated 5.31 million household viewers and gained a 0.9/3 ratings share among adults aged 18–49, according to Nielsen Media Research. This means that 0.9 percent of all households with televisions watched the episode, while 3 percent of all households watching television at that time watched it. This was a 28% decrease in viewership from the previous episode, which was watched by 7.34 million viewers with a 1.1/4 in the 18-49 demographics. With these ratings, Person of Interest was the third most watched show on CBS for the night, behind The Odd Couple, a The Big Bang Theory rerun, and two Mike & Molly episodes, third on its timeslot and tenth for the night in the 18-49 demographics, behind Gotham, Blindspot, The Odd Couple, Castle, a The Big Bang Theory rerun, two Mike & Molly episodes, Dancing with the Stars, and The Voice.

With Live +7 DVR factored in, the episode was watched by 7.69 million viewers with a 1.4 in the 18-49 demographics.

=== Critical reviews ===
"6,741" received universal acclaim from critics. Matt Fowler of IGN gave the episode a perfect "masterpiece" 10 out of 10 rating and wrote in his verdict, "'6,741' was a steller, evolutionary example just how insanely touching and thought-provoking this series can be. With 'If-Then-Else' as its launching pad, this episode cleverly sucked us into a virtual world of love and sacrifice."

Alexa Planje of The A.V. Club gave the episode an "A" grade and wrote, "The storytelling is breathlessly efficient, moving, suspenseful, and twisty; the character of Shaw and Shahi's performance anchor the entire enterprise, ensuring that it stays grounded and on-target. If that weren't enough, this is one of the most well-executed episodes of a particularly well-executed show in regards to details. The direction is artful; the lighting is divine; the score is on point; the flashback montages are terrifying. In summary, this one should automatically go on everyone's highlight reel."

Emily VanDerWerff of Vox wrote, "Thus, as viewers become savvier, TV becomes more and more of a balancing act — schmuck bait rises up here and there, and the show has to find ways to subvert it, to let the viewers know it's two steps ahead of them. Such an episode is Person of Interest's '6,741.'"

Chancellor Agard of Entertainment Weekly wrote, "In general, I'm usually weary of 'It Was All A Dream' episodes because I think they can be very gimmicky. But I didn't feel that way here because the narrative device was very much in service of character. '6,741' packs such an emotional punch because it's all about Shaw's relationship with her teammates."

Sean McKenna of TV Fanatic gave the episode a 4.8 star rating out of 5 and wrote "'6,741' was a huge step up from 'Truth Be Told', diving back into the bigger story and revealing a tragic truth that Shaw is still captured. And to see what's she's had to endure this whole time? A powerful hour that thrust us right back into the dangerous and affecting war against Samaritan."
