= Skip (Person of Interest) =

- Person of Interest episode
- Episode no.: Season 4 Episode 18
- Directed by: Helen Shaver
- Written by: Ashley Gable
- Cinematography by: David Insley
- Editing by: Ryan Malanaphy
- Production code: 3J5418
- Original air date: March 24, 2015
- Running time: 43 minutes

Guest appearances
- Annie Ilonzeh as Harper Rose; Jessica Hecht as Beth Bridges; Wrenn Schmidt as Dr. Iris Campbell; Ato Essandoh as Ray Pratt; Jeff LaMarre as Carlton Worthy; Katheryn Winnick as Frankie Wells

Episode chronology
← Previous "Karma"	Next → "Search and Destroy"

"Skip" is the 18th episode of the fourth season of the American television drama series Person of Interest. It is the 86th overall episode of the series and is written by co-executive producer Ashley Gable and directed by Helen Shaver. It aired on CBS in the United States and on CTV in Canada on March 24, 2015.

The series revolves around a computer program for the federal government known as "The Machine" that is capable of collating all sources of information to predict terrorist acts and to identify people planning them. A team follows "irrelevant" crimes: lesser level of priority for the government. However, their security and safety is put in danger following the activation of a new program named Samaritan. In the episode, Reese follows a bounty hunter who goes after a criminal but Harper Rose gets involved in the conflict for her own benefit. Meanwhile, Finch asks Root for help in protecting Beth Bridges when he fears for her life.

According to Nielsen Media Research, the episode was seen by an estimated 9.15 million household viewers and gained a 1.5/5 ratings share among adults aged 18–49. The episode received very positive reviews, with critics praising Katheryn Winnick's guest performance and Finch's and Root's storyline.

== Plot ==
Reese (Jim Caviezel) infiltrates a card room to investigate their new number: Frankie Wells (Katheryn Winnick), who works as a hostess there. He catches Frankie trying to subdue her boss Ray (Ato Essandoh) and tries to stop her but she escapes, taking his badge with her.

At the precinct, Reese is told by Dr. Campbell (Wrenn Schmidt) that she will stop her therapy sessions with him and redirects him to another doctor, giving no explanation. Reese locates Frankie in a bar and realizes she is a bounty hunter whose new target was Ray. Ray sees them and escapes with the help of Harper Rose (Annie Ilonzeh), who works with him. Meanwhile, Finch (Michael Emerson) meets with Beth Bridges (Jessica Hecht) and realizes that she plans to meet with an investor that works for Samaritan in order to learn her new new algorithm. Concerned for her safety, Finch asks Root (Amy Acker) for help, which she accepts.

Reese and Frankie locate Harper at a club but she provides no information on her role. They follow her in a car chase but they are subdued by Carlton Worthy (Jeff LaMarre), who is also looking for Ray and Harper. They are captured and handcuffed in a shop but they break loose and overcome their captors. However, Frankie tricks Reese with a kiss so she can handcuff him and escape. Finch and Root follow Bridges and returning to Finch's college office, finding it was trashed after someone looked for something. Finch then explains to Root that he intends to activate a Trojan Horse he installed on her laptop via a special device. Root starts getting concerned about this.

Finch then discovers that a threat to Bridges' life is Root herself, revealed to be the person who trashed Finch's office. She excuses her actions, explaining that Samaritan will find a connection between Bridges and him and will probably result on his death. She also reveals that the Machine didn't assign the mission but she will carry with it in order to avoid more losses after what happened to Shaw. Finch, reluctant to let Bridges die for him, drinks the neurotoxin. Root reluctantly agrees to stop her plan in order to take Finch to the hospital. They leave the building just as Bridges arrives.

Reese follows Frankie to Atlantic Highlands, New Jersey to find her confronting Ray. It turns out that the bounty is personal for her as Ray is responsible for her brother's death. Ray's men arrive and start a gunfight with Reese and Frankie. Harper manages to negotiate a resolution to the conflict. However, Ray is reluctant to stick to the plan and tries to kill everyone but Reese shoots him. While the police arrest Ray, Harper tells Reese that Thornhill (The Machine) has been sending her texts. At the precinct, Campbell confesses to Reese that she stopped her sessions for developing feelings for him, which would be deemed unprofessional. She then kisses him, and he responds with another kiss.

Finch visits Bridges for a date but she angrily refuses. She shows him an e-mail where Finch discredits her research to a magazine, effectively ruining her reputation and she cuts ties with Finch. Finch confronts Root, who confesses to be responsible as well as destroying the Trojan Horse. A doubly devastated Finch tells her to leave the team for a while, unwilling to work with her.

== Reception ==
=== Viewers ===
In its original American broadcast, "Skip" was seen by an estimated 9.15 million household viewers and gained a 1.5/5 ratings share among adults aged 18–49, according to Nielsen Media Research. This means that 1.5 percent of all households with televisions watched the episode, while 5 percent of all households watching television at that time watched it. This was a 5% increase in viewership from the previous episode, which was watched by 8.67 million viewers with a 1.5/5 in the 18-49 demographics. With these ratings, Person of Interest was the third most watched show on CBS for the night, behind NCIS: New Orleans and NCIS, first on its timeslot and fourth for the night in the 18-49 demographics, behind NCIS: New Orleans, NCIS, and The Voice.

With Live +7 DVR factored in, the episode was watched by 12.58 million viewers with a 2.3 in the 18-49 demographics.

=== Critical reviews ===
"Skip" received very positive reviews from critics. Matt Fowler of IGN gave the episode a "great" 8.6 out of 10 rating and wrote in his verdict, "'Skip' was a nice balance between breezy and brutal. It brought back Finch's algorithm sabotage plan and used it to create some very powerful moments between Finch and Root. And Katheryn Winnick's beautiful bounty hunter is welcome back any day. As is Ilonzeh's Harper. Though, truthfully, her inclusion in this one made it a bit crowded."

Alexa Planje of The A.V. Club gave the episode an "A−" grade and wrote, "This episode explores agendas, the priorities that must be rigid enough to move humans to action but flexible enough to allow for evolution and negotiation."
