= Q&A (Person of Interest) =

- Person of Interest episode
- Episode no.: Season 4 Episode 15
- Directed by: Stephen Semel
- Written by: Dan Dietz
- Cinematography by: David Insley
- Editing by: Ryan Malanaphy
- Production code: 3J5415
- Original air date: February 17, 2015
- Running time: 43 minutes

Guest appearances
- Bella Dayne as Anna Mueller; Nick Westrate as Calvin Mazer; Quinn Shephard as Claire Mahoney; Heléne Yorke as Lauren Buchanan; John Nolan as John Greer; Omar Maskati as Naresh Presad

Episode chronology
← Previous "Guilty"	Next → "Blunt"

"Q&A" is the 15th episode of the fourth season of the American television drama series Person of Interest. It is the 83rd overall episode of the series and is written by Dan Dietz and directed by supervising producer Stephen Semel. It aired on CBS in the United States and on CTV in Canada on February 17, 2015.

The series revolves around a computer program for the federal government known as "The Machine" that is capable of collating all sources of information to predict terrorist acts and to identify people planning them. A team follows "irrelevant" crimes: lesser level of priority for the government. However, their security and safety is put in danger following the activation of a new program named Samaritan. In the episode, Reese and Finch work undercover to investigate a co-worker from a web development company and her own investigation in the company's shady practices. Finch is also contacted by Claire Mahoney for help in fighting Samaritan. The title is an abbreviation of the phrase "question and answer", and refers to a period of time or an occasion that follows a type of interview format.

According to Nielsen Media Research, the episode was seen by an estimated 9.17 million household viewers and gained a 1.6/5 ratings share among adults aged 18–49. The episode received very positive reviews, with critics praising the performances, action scenes and writing.

== Plot ==
Reese (Jim Caviezel) and Finch (Michael Emerson) work undercover in a new web development company called Fetch & Retrieve to closely monitor their new number: Anna Mueller (Bella Dayne). They are introduced to their algorithm VAL, which is supposed to help users. Reese follows Anna after finding evidence that she might be abused. However, he finds that Anna participates in an underground mixed martial arts tournament, which explains her injuries.

Finch discovers that a new Nautilus game started and by its instructions, it does not appear Samaritan is involved. He goes to a location to find Claire Mahoney (Quinn Shephard), who asks for his help when she is shot by a Samaritan sniper. Finch takes her to a mortuary, where Claire explains that after completing the game, she was recruited by Decima Technologies to program. When she realized their actions caused the death of civilians, she hacked their system and fled the organization. She also reveals she recovered some source code from Samaritan and wants him to use it on his laptop to stop Samaritan.

Reese breaks into Anna's house and finds that her sister Jill is undergoing chemotherapy. He later prevents her kidnapping from an undisclosed group and takes her to the precinct. She reveals that she found out that VAL gave pro-suicidal tips to a man named Paul Zimmerman, who committed suicide and there's evidence VAL gave the same advices to other people suffering from depression. Fusco (Kevin Chapman) talks with Finch and Finch starts getting suspicious of Claire's allegiance as her story of a death does not match up but she manages to convince him of the veracity of the story.

Anna and Fusco race to her house when they receive an emergency call from her sister but it turns out to be a trap, which ends with Fusco sedated and Anna kidnapped. But Anna releases herself and fights her captors until Reese saves her from the SUV. Fusco investigates further with the help of an intern and both express their concerns to CEO Lauren Buchanan (Heléne Yorke). However, the company's CTO, Calvin Mazer (Nick Westrate), is revealed to be behind VAL. He reveals that he altered VAL's source code to target people with depression, gambling problems and debt, for the sake of the advertisers. Reese rescues them, and Calvin is arrested. At the mortuary, Finch's fears are confirmed when Claire pulls out a gun and plans to take him to meet Samaritan.

Claire leads Finch at gunpoint to a school run by Samaritan to convince him to join by showing him the progress Samaritan made in order to educate children, but he refuses. Just as they are leaving the school escorted by Samaritan agents, Root (Amy Acker) arrives, kills the agents and wounds Claire before she flees. Finch recovers his phone but his laptop has been taken by Claire. Claire takes the laptop to Greer (John Nolan), who starts having it analyzed. He then leaves for a meeting with Fetch & Retrieve as an investor.

== Reception ==
=== Viewers ===
In its original American broadcast, "Q&A" was seen by an estimated 9.17 million household viewers and gained a 1.6/5 ratings share among adults aged 18–49, according to Nielsen Media Research. This means that 1.6 percent of all households with televisions watched the episode, while 5 percent of all households watching television at that time watched it. This was a 4% decrease in viewership from the previous episode, which was watched by 9.53 million viewers with a 1.6/5 in the 18-49 demographics. With these ratings, Person of Interest was the third most watched show on CBS for the night, behind NCIS: New Orleans and NCIS, first on its timeslot and fifth for the night in the 18-49 demographics, behind MasterChef Junior, Fresh Off the Boat, NCIS: New Orleans, and NCIS.

With Live +7 DVR factored in, the episode was watched by 12.72 million viewers with a 2.4 in the 18-49 demographics.

=== Critical reviews ===
"Q&A" received very positive reviews from critics. Matt Fowler of IGN gave the episode a "great" 8.8 out of 10 rating and wrote in his verdict, "The Claire/Finch showdown was great. Especially the part where she referenced it as being like a chess match. Because, as we know, that 'thinking it's all a game' element may ultimately be part of Samaritan's downfall. And Root coming back was as awesome as it was mysterious. We still don't know what's she's doing exactly nowadays. Or what her relationship is like with the Machine. The underground MMA stuff made Reese think Anna was in danger because of her fighting, but I think we'd already figured out that it was due to the abnormal algorithm she mentioned to Naresh."

Alexa Planje of The A.V. Club gave the episode a "B+" grade and wrote, "Instead of relying on overwrought cliffhangers and over-emphasized questions to retain its audience's interest, Person of Interest doles out answer after answer, confident that the cohesion of this season and the strength of its characters will bring back viewers week after week. It's clear that there's a plan in mind, but the real question of the season is whether or not all of the puzzle pieces will fit together at the end of the season."
