= Terra Incognita (Person of Interest) =

- Person of Interest episode
- Episode no.: Season 4 Episode 20
- Directed by: Alrick Riley
- Written by: Erik Mountain & Melissa Scrivner Love
- Cinematography by: David Insley
- Editing by: Mark Conte
- Production code: 3J5420
- Original air date: April 14, 2015
- Running time: 43 minutes

Guest appearances
- Taraji P. Henson as Detective Joss Carter; Al Sapienza as Detective Raymond Terney; Patch Darragh as Gil; Zachary Booth as Chase Patterson

Episode chronology
← Previous "Search and Destroy"	Next → "Asylum"

"Terra Incognita" is the 20th episode of the fourth season of the American television drama series Person of Interest. It is the 88th overall episode of the series and is written by producer Erik Mountain and supervising producer Melissa Scrivner Love and directed by Alrick Riley. It aired on CBS in the United States and on CTV in Canada on April 14, 2015.

The series revolves around a computer program for the federal government known as "The Machine" that is capable of collating all sources of information to predict terrorist acts and to identify people planning them. A team follows "irrelevant" crimes: lesser level of priority for the government. However, their security and safety is put in danger following the activation of a new program named Samaritan. In the episode, Reese decides to investigate one of Carter's unsolved cases to honor her memory. During the episode, there are scenes of flashbacks to contrast the present scenes. The title refers to "Terra incognita", which is Latin for "Unknown land", a term used in cartography for regions that have not been mapped or documented. The episode marked the return of Taraji P. Henson following her character's death in "The Crossing".

According to Nielsen Media Research, the episode was seen by an estimated 9.21 million household viewers and gained a 1.5/5 ratings share among adults aged 18–49. The episode received critical acclaim, with critics praising Henson's return and Caviezel's performance, writing, editing and directing, with many deeming it one of the series' best episodes.

== Plot ==
=== Flashbacks ===
In 2008, rookie Carter (Taraji P. Henson) is partnered with Detective Raymond Terney (Al Sapienza) to investigate Chase Patterson's (Zachary Booth) family's murder. All signs point to Chase being alienated from his family. She questions Chase but he states he is innocent. Terney is convinced he is guilty but Carter is hesitant. She inspects Chase's cabin and hears noise inside but finds nothing. She is then called by Terney, who tells her that Chase fled to Paris but they are dropping the case to work on a new one.

=== Present day ===
Reese (Jim Caviezel) is notified by Fusco (Kevin Chapman) of the death of two Brotherhood members at the hand of an Elias ally. Finch (Michael Emerson) interrupts to announce their new number: Chase Patterson, who has been suspected of murdering his family and only avoided charges when he hid in Paris. Finch and Fusco decide to interrogate Elias' ally with the help of Root (Amy Acker) while Reese decides to investigate Chase's case and discovers that Carter investigated the case. In the process, Reese finds the picture of his lost love Jessica which had been found and kept by Carter years earlier.

Reese starts by interrogating Chase, but he still affirms he is innocent. Reese then visits the cabin where he claims he was during the murders and finds drugs, although Chase claims that he does not own them. Reese is then shot by Chase's half-brother Gil (Patch Darragh), who was the doorman at their building and is the real killer, having targeted the family after his father's abandonment. Gil forces Chase to consume lethal drugs that will kill him in a few hours and drags Reese's body through the snow to bury him but Reese wakes up and shoots him, killing him, although Reese is wounded in return.

Throughout the episode, there are scenes of Reese, Finch and Carter watching over a former HR member. While Finch is away, Reese and Carter talk about their plans for the future, with Carter expressing interest in retiring after 20 years. Reese is unconvinced of both getting "happy endings" but Carter mentions his own transformation, showing that anyone can make a change. He brings up the subject of Jessica, revealing he left her because he didn't think he would survive in the army. At this point, it's revealed that their talk is part of hallucinations due to his blood loss.

As the team does not know his location and the area is off-limits to the Machine, Reese is forced to escape the area by retrieving a car's keys from Gil's corpse. However, the engine does not work and it's revealed that Reese is dying from hypothermia. He talks with Carter, who confronts him about his alienation of people, including Jessica and Carter herself, confirming that their talk in the car was just Reese's imagination of a talk that never happened. Reese admits taking Chase's case just so he could feel more connected with Carter again. Carter then concludes that Reese must let his loved ones stay close to him. After Reese finishes talking with Carter, she disappears from his hallucination, and a car pulls up, implied to be Fusco.

== Reception ==
=== Viewers ===
In its original American broadcast, "Terra Incognita" was seen by an estimated 9.21 million household viewers and gained a 1.5/5 ratings share among adults aged 18–49, according to Nielsen Media Research. This means that 1.5 percent of all households with televisions watched the episode, while 5 percent of all households watching television at that time watched it. This was a 6% increase in viewership from the previous episode, which was watched by 8.67 million viewers with a 1.3/4 in the 18–49 demographics. With these ratings, Person of Interest was the third most watched show on CBS for the night, behind NCIS: New Orleans and NCIS, first on its timeslot and fifth for the night in the 18–49 demographics, behind Agents of S.H.I.E.L.D., NCIS: New Orleans, NCIS, and The Voice.

With Live +7 DVR factored in, the episode was watched by 12.13 million viewers with a 2.2 in the 18–49 demographics.

=== Critical reviews ===
"Terra Incognita" received critical acclaim from critics. Matt Fowler of IGN gave the episode an "amazing" 9.6 out of 10 rating and wrote in his verdict, "I'm more than willing forgive the fact that the actual mystery behind the murder case was pure fluff because Henson and Caviezel were so good in this episode. Plus, the case was more or less incidental to the emotional ride. What a joy it was to see Henson back on the show. And not just for a moment or two. Not for a tease. This was Carter and Reese's episode. They started out separated by flashbacks, but as the chapter went along their moments were practically on top of one another. Until they finally combined and Reese began to see her in the present. And then, when he finally realized that he'd never shared himself with Carter, the scene switched back and forth in the car, from the past to the present. This was a triumph."

Alexa Planje of The A.V. Club gave the episode an "A" grade and wrote, "Reese's hallucinations of Carter are used to explore his psychology, a psychology that resembles that of a troubled superhero, a narrative that has been repeated time and time again, and is currently keeping The CW in business. 'Terra Incognita' recycles these conventions, but it does so with purpose."
