= Karma (Person of Interest) =

- Person of Interest episode
- Episode no.: Season 4 Episode 17
- Directed by: Chris Fisher
- Written by: Hillary Benefiel & Sabir Pirzada
- Cinematography by: Peter Hlinomaz
- Editing by: Mark Conte & L.B. Brodie
- Production code: 3J5417
- Original air date: March 10, 2015
- Running time: 43 minutes

Guest appearances
- Patrick Kennedy as Dr. Shane Edwards; Elizabeth Marvel as Alicia Corwin; Wrenn Schmidt as Dr. Iris Campbell; Daniel Sauli as Wyatt Morris; Marjan Neshat as Becca

Episode chronology
← Previous "Blunt"	Next → "Skip"

"Karma" is the 17th episode of the fourth season of the American television drama series Person of Interest. It is the 85th overall episode of the series and is written by Hillary Benefiel and Sabir Pirzada and directed by co-executive producer Chris Fisher. It aired on CBS in the United States and on CTV in Canada on March 10, 2015.

The series revolves around a computer program for the federal government known as "The Machine" that is capable of collating all sources of information to predict terrorist acts and to identify people planning them. A team follows "irrelevant" crimes: lesser level of priority for the government. However, their security and safety is put in danger following the activation of a new program named Samaritan. In the episode, the team investigates a psychiatrist who turns out to be a vigilante who frames criminals from his patients after his wife's murder. The title refers to "Karma", which refers to the spiritual principle of cause and effect, often descriptively called the principle of karma, wherein intent and actions of an individual influence the future of that individual. Despite being credited, Amy Acker does not appear in the episode.

According to Nielsen Media Research, the episode was seen by an estimated 8.67 million household viewers and gained a 1.5/5 ratings share among adults aged 18–49. The episode received generally positive reviews, with critics praising the moral dilemma established by the episode.

== Plot ==
=== Flashbacks ===
In 2010, after Ingram's death, Finch (Michael Emerson) uses a voice filter to call Alicia Corwin (Elizabeth Marvel), threatening her with knowledge of her role in Ingram's death. He overhears her phone call to Special Counsel and prepares to take action with an explosive when the Machine reveals a number: Finch himself. The next day, he intends to kill her by planting the explosive on her car but the Machine keeps pressuring him not go for it. Finch reiterates that he will do it because the Machine has no voice to tell him what to do.

He plants the bomb and sees as Corwin enters. With a device, he locks the car and starts taunting Corwin through the voice filter until the payphone rings. Corwin then talks through a microphone, stating that although she wasn't fully aware of the government's intentions for Ingram, she still takes the blame for his death. This prompts Finch not to go with his plan, and causing the payphone to stop ringing, no longer deeming him a threat.

=== Present day ===
Reese (Jim Caviezel) and Finch work on their new number: Dr. Shane Edwards (Patrick Kennedy), a psychiatrist whose wife was murdered eight years earlier, an event which continues to haunt him. The team determines that Edwards has been studying the people who traumatized his clients and got away with it, then carefully crafting frame-ups in order to punish them for their crimes.

During a charity event, the team realizes that Wyatt Morris (Daniel Sauli), the man who killed Edwards' wife, got released on parole and is in the building. He threatens Edwards before being escorted out by security. On his way to his car, Edwards is nearly killed when his car explodes and Morris flees. The team realizes that Edwards lied on his testimony at the time of witnessing his wife's death and also find him buying a gun on Morris' name. Despite Fusco (Kevin Chapman) insisting on letting Morris suffer consequences, Finch wants to find more about the case as it may appear Morris is innocent.

Edwards plants evidence to incriminate Morris in a soon-to-be crime. Morris then finds Edwards in a greenhouse, holding him at gunpoint and revealing his plan: to commit suicide and make it appear that Morris murdered him. Finch arrives and through his experience with Corwin, explains to Edwards that going with his plan will not bring him closure. Edwards then decides to drop his plan and moves on with his life. On his next session with Dr. Campbell (Wrenn Schmidt), Reese opens up about grief by talking about Jessica's death. Later, Reese and Finch question whether Morris killed Edwards' wife but Finch states that the truth will probably just remain with the Machine.

== Reception ==
=== Viewers ===
In its original American broadcast, "Karma" was seen by an estimated 8.67 million household viewers and gained a 1.5/5 ratings share among adults aged 18–49, according to Nielsen Media Research. This means that 1.5 percent of all households with televisions watched the episode, while 5 percent of all households watching television at that time watched it. This was a 10% decrease in viewership from the previous episode, which was watched by 9.63 million viewers with a 1.7/5 in the 18-49 demographics. With these ratings, Person of Interest was the third most watched show on CBS for the night, behind NCIS: New Orleans and NCIS, second on its timeslot and fifth for the night in the 18-49 demographics, behind NCIS: New Orleans, Chicago Fire, NCIS, and The Voice.

With Live +7 DVR factored in, the episode was watched by 12.12 million viewers with a 2.4 in the 18-49 demographics.

=== Critical reviews ===
"Karma" received generally positive reviews from critics. Matt Fowler of IGN gave the episode a "great" 8.2 out of 10 rating and wrote in his verdict, "Not everything clicked together completely in 'Karma,' but I liked how it took a weighty, non-shoot 'em up approach to some serious issues. Ones that were sort of left open ended. I mean, even if Finch talked Edwards out of framing Morris, Team Machine was more than okay with letting all the other people Edwards framed sit in prison. Even when he could have been wrong about them too."

Alexa Planje of The A.V. Club gave the episode a "B" grade and wrote, "At first glance, 'Karma' appears to be completely competent, aggressively inessential television. The episode is very focused, which is admirable, but too much of a good thing can be a problem."
