= Search and Destroy (Person of Interest) =

- Person of Interest episode
- Episode no.: Season 4 Episode 19
- Directed by: Stephen Surjik
- Written by: Zak Schwartz
- Cinematography by: Peter Hlinomaz
- Editing by: Scott A. Jacobs
- Production code: 3J5419
- Original air date: April 7, 2015
- Running time: 43 minutes

Guest appearances
- Aasif Mandvi as Sulaiman Khan; Paige Turco as Zoe Morgan; Cara Buono as Martine Rousseau; John Nolan as John Greer; Jessica Leccia as Linda Khan; Stephen Park as Mark; Jonathan Walker as Joseph Nicassio; Elia Monte-Brown as Kelly Brewer

Episode chronology
← Previous "Skip"	Next → "Terra Incognita"

"Search and Destroy" is the 19th episode of the fourth season of the American television drama series Person of Interest. It is the 87th overall episode of the series and is written by producer Zak Schwartz and directed by Stephen Surjik. It aired on CBS in the United States and on CTV in Canada on April 7, 2015.

The series revolves around a computer program for the federal government known as "The Machine" that is capable of collating all sources of information to predict terrorist acts and to identify people planning them. A team follows "irrelevant" crimes: lesser level of priority for the government. However, their security and safety is put in danger following the activation of a new program named Samaritan. In the episode, Reese and Finch must protect the CEO of a company following a leak that may lead to his downfall and possible death. The title refers to "Search and destroy", a military strategy where the idea was to insert ground forces into hostile territory, search out the enemy, destroy them, and withdraw immediately afterward.

According to Nielsen Media Research, the episode was seen by an estimated 8.67 million household viewers and gained a 1.3/4 ratings share among adults aged 18–49. The episode received highly positive reviews, with critics praising the writing, performances and action scenes.

== Plot ==
Reese (Jim Caviezel) and Finch (Michael Emerson) investigate their new number: Sulaiman Khan (Aasif Mandvi), CEO of Castellum, a company known for having the most widespread antivirus software, installed on most networked devices. Khan's company has been hacked and documents show that he has committed embezzlement. These leaks also reveal other information that causes those with relationships to Khan to cut ties.

Khan's company has a meeting to discuss whether they should fire Khan over the recent leaks. Due to Finch not wanting to work with Root (Amy Acker), Reese has Zoe Morgan (Paige Turco) infiltrate the company. The board of directors unanimously decide to fire Khan from his position and he is escorted out of the building. The team deduces that Samaritan is behind everything after realizing no human would have been able to gather and leak the data so fast. Despite Finch's insistence in not intervening due to the danger Samaritan poses to the team, Reese decides to continue with the mission. Khan breaks into the company's utility room to see the electrical meters, but the police arrive and arrest him. Khan is arrested and sent to Rikers Island after being in custody just 20 minutes. The team realizes Samaritan plans to kill Khan.

Meanwhile, Root uses another alias to go to a restaurant and uses an incapacitating agent to sedate everyone and leave with a briefcase. She is pursued by Decima agents but she subdues them. Her actions attract interest from Greer (John Nolan), who sends Rousseau (Cara Buono) to kill her.

Unable to release Khan, Reese is forced to help Khan escape from prison. During their escape, Samaritan activates automatic traffic bollards which causes a car crash, disabling the vehicle. Root arrives to save them and take them to a safehouse. Khan tells the team that when he saw the electrical meters, they revealed the company has been drawing more power than the servers should be using. Company funds were also used to buy large amounts of diesel fuel, despite the company not using a generator.

Data transmissions from the company HQ in the city lead to a seemingly undeveloped plot of forest, where the team finds an underground complex. They discover that this is where Samaritan is using a modified version of Khan's antivirus software on a massive scale, searching for something on every networked device that the program is installed on. They are ambushed by Decima agents and moments after realizing the real power of Samaritan, Khan disappears. Root fights Rousseau and nearly kills her, but Reese urges her to leave.

At the station, Root receives the code to open the briefcase from the Machine, revealing a Fabergé egg inside. Upon hearing from the Machine, she smashes it, but keeps the briefcase itself. Finch tells Reese that Samaritan is using Khan's software to find the Machine's location, as it is looking for code only the Machine has. Khan turns out to be captured and brought to Greer, who reveals they tried to find the Machine, but it's not connected to any network they could find. Khan asks to "look Samaritan in its eyes", to which Greer responds by shooting and letting him watch Samaritan's output while he dies.

== Reception ==
=== Viewers ===
In its original American broadcast, "Search and Destroy" was seen by an estimated 8.67 million household viewers and gained a 1.3/4 ratings share among adults aged 18–49, according to Nielsen Media Research. This means that 1.3 percent of all households with televisions watched the episode, while 4 percent of all households watching television at that time watched it. This was a 6% decrease in viewership from the previous episode, which was watched by 9.15 million viewers with a 1.5/5 in the 18-49 demographics. With these ratings, Person of Interest was the third most watched show on CBS for the night, behind NCIS: New Orleans and NCIS, second on its timeslot and sixth for the night in the 18-49 demographics, behind Fresh Off the Boat, Agents of S.H.I.E.L.D., NCIS: New Orleans, NCIS, and The Voice.

With Live +7 DVR factored in, the episode was watched by 11.99 million viewers with a 2.1 in the 18-49 demographics.

=== Critical reviews ===
"Search and Destroy" received highly positive reviews from critics. Matt Fowler of IGN gave the episode a "great" 8.8 out of 10 rating and wrote in his verdict, "In 'Search and Destroy,' Samaritan wasn't out to recruit, it was out to obliterate. Much like the 'terrorists' it helped destroy back in 'Control-Alt-Delete,' Khan found himself ruined and killed as part of Samaritan's plan to defeat its rivals and dominate humanity. The way it railroaded Khan into prison in order to kill him off was sort of terrifying, and the way it popped up those bollards to stop Reese on the road proved that it could be physically dangerous without human help. Also, Root and Martine's rivalry makes for fun TV. Their first gun fight was better, but this time Root got to throw out a cool 'places to go, people to kill' line."

Alexa Planje of The A.V. Club gave the episode an "A" grade and wrote, "'Search and Destroy' is not the most cerebral episode of Person of Interest, but that hardly matters when everything from the writing, to the performances, to the technical components are executed at such a high level. This episode is heavy on the action and thrills, not to mention the spare but effective comedy."
