= Blunt (Person of Interest) =

- Person of Interest episode
- Episode no.: Season 4 Episode 16
- Directed by: Frederick E. O. Toye
- Written by: Amanda Segel & Greg Plageman
- Cinematography by: David Insley
- Editing by: Scott A. Jacobs
- Production code: 3J5416
- Original air date: February 24, 2015
- Running time: 43 minutes

Guest appearances
- Annie Ilonzeh as Harper Rose; Connor Hines as Trey Wender; Winston Duke as Dominic Besson; Carlos Leon as Nico; Luke Kleintank as Caleb Phipps; William DeMeritt as Noah; Jessica Pimentel as Floyd

Episode chronology
← Previous "Q&A"	Next → "Karma"

"Blunt" is the 16th episode of the fourth season of the American television drama series Person of Interest. It is the 84th overall episode of the series and is written by co-executive producer Amanda Segel and executive producer Greg Plageman and directed by Frederick E. O. Toye. It aired on CBS in the United States and on CTV in Canada on February 24, 2015.

The series revolves around a computer program for the federal government known as "The Machine" that is capable of collating all sources of information to predict terrorist acts and to identify people planning them. A team follows "irrelevant" crimes: lesser level of priority for the government. However, their security and safety is put in danger following the activation of a new program named Samaritan. In the episode, the team must save a grifter who stole money from Dominic's crew and may face retaliation for her actions. Meanwhile, Root tries to sell an application she developed at The Machine's request, which she hopes will aid in trying to defeat Samaritan. The title refers to "blunt", a cigar that has been hollowed out and filled with cannabis.

According to Nielsen Media Research, the episode was seen by an estimated 9.63 million household viewers and gained a 1.7/5 ratings share among adults aged 18–49. The episode received generally positive reviews, although critics expressed frustration at the case and pace of the episode.

== Plot ==
Reese (Jim Caviezel) is following their new number: Harper Rose (Annie Ilonzeh), a college student. He sees as she covers for her boyfriend Trey (Connor Hines) at his job, which turns out to be a legalized marijuana dispensary. It turns out that the dispensary serves as a center of operations for Dominic (Winston Duke).

During a money transfer, The Brotherhood is intercepted by gang members, who take their money. Reese realizes that Harper cooperated with the gang to steal the money. Her actions result in two of Dominic's men guarding a money laundering operation killed by the Parral Cartel. She confesses that she stole the money to cover her debts but her actions also put pressure on other gangs to seek retaliation. For her actions, Dominic and his men kidnap Trey to question him about the money, despite Trey being unaware of Harper's actions.

To settle the debt, Reese meets with Dominic and offers to return the money stolen by Harper in exchange for Trey and the hit being called off on Harper, but he refuses. Harper decides to visit the Estonian mafia after suggesting the plan to Reese and Finch (Michael Emerson) and tells them about Dominic's money laundering operation, and lures them to Dominic's location while Reese rescues Trey. Fusco and the NYPD arrive and arrest the Parral Cartel, initially on possessing weapons illegally. Dominic and his crew are quickly released when he produces legal documents that show their guns are registered to his private security company.

Dominic attempts to recruit Harper, who refuses, but he leaves the door open if she changes her mind. Root (Amy Acker) meets with Caleb Phipps (Luke Kleintank), who now owns a software firm. She tries to sell an application she developed at The Machine's request, which she hopes will aid in trying to defeat Samaritan. Phipps accepts her in the firm.

== Reception ==
=== Viewers ===
In its original American broadcast, "Blunt" was seen by an estimated 9.63 million household viewers and gained a 1.7/5 ratings share among adults aged 18–49, according to Nielsen Media Research. This means that 1.7 percent of all households with televisions watched the episode, while 5 percent of all households watching television at that time watched it. This was a 5% increase in viewership from the previous episode, which was watched by 9.17 million viewers with a 1.6/5 in the 18-49 demographics. With these ratings, Person of Interest was the third most watched show on CBS for the night, behind NCIS: New Orleans and NCIS, first on its timeslot and fifth for the night in the 18-49 demographics, behind Fresh Off the Boat, NCIS: New Orleans, NCIS, and The Voice.

With Live +7 DVR factored in, the episode was watched by 13.30 million viewers with a 2.6 in the 18-49 demographics.

=== Critical reviews ===
"Blunt" received generally positive reviews from critics. Matt Fowler of IGN gave the episode a "great" 8 out of 10 rating and wrote in his verdict, "This was a more modest POI episode, in most every aspect. Lighter on action, suspense, and stuck with a middle-story dilemma that wasn't all that intriguing. Sure, I don't want innocent people to die, but everything hinging on Trey being rescued wasn't exactly going to suck me in. I never felt like he was in absolute peril. Especially when Dom started talking to him in depth about some of his virtual money laundering plans. Harper was a fun addition and Reese sitting down with Dom (along with the question 'Why does Elias get a pass?') was a cool moment. It just felt like something more could have come from it."

Alexa Planje of The A.V. Club gave the episode a "B−" grade and wrote, "On a dense show that operates with more than fifty shades of gray, a character like Harper and a crime plot need to achieve more than ethical complexity to stand out."
