= SNAFU (Person of Interest) =

- Person of Interest episode
- Episode no.: Season 5 Episode 2
- Directed by: Chris Fisher
- Written by: Lucas O'Connor
- Cinematography by: David Insley
- Editing by: Ryan Malanaphy
- Production code: 3J6002
- Original air date: May 9, 2016
- Running time: 44 minutes

Guest appearances
- Josh Close as Jeff Blackwell; LaChanze as Mona; Paige Patterson as Laurie Granger

Episode chronology
| ← Previous "B.S.O.D." | Next → "Truth Be Told" |

"SNAFU" is the 2nd episode of the fifth season of the American television drama series Person of Interest. It is the 92nd overall episode of the series and is written by Lucas O'Connor and directed by executive producer Chris Fisher. It aired on CBS in the United States and on CTV in Canada on May 9, 2016.

The series revolves around a computer program for the federal government known as "The Machine" that is capable of collating all sources of information to predict terrorist acts and to identify people planning them. A team follows "irrelevant" crimes: lesser level of priority for the government. However, their security and safety is put in danger following the activation of a new program named Samaritan. In the episode, the Machine is rebooted but it assigns numbers with no threat to the team. To complicate matters, it starts seeing the team as threats, because it can't come up with a timeline and tell how they changed. The title refers to "SNAFU", an acronym that is widely used to stand for the sarcastic expression "Situation Normal: All Fucked Up".

According to Nielsen Media Research, the episode was seen by an estimated 5.80 million household viewers and gained a 1.0/4 ratings share among adults aged 18–49. The episode received very positive reviews from critics, who praised the writing, humor and exploration of the Machine's themes.

== Plot ==
Two months after being decompressed, the Machine starts the process of rebooting, although it struggles in identifying its assets through facial recognition. Needing more resources to properly activate the Machine, Reese (Jim Caviezel) and Finch (Michael Emerson) steal 64 next-generation GPU blade servers while Root (Amy Acker) works to make the Machine recover its memories and database.

Once activated, the Machine properly works and Finch starts asking for the irrelevant numbers. The Machine ends up producing 30 numbers so the team works separately on each case. Reese pursues a bomb threat but finds that it was a call from a student to skip school while Fusco (Kevin Chapman) pursues a killer but finds that it's just a play. Finch and Root find that the Machine fails to differentiate threat with violence as it knows no context or background. They decide to run a contextual background on themselves. However, the Machine, after collecting all their actions, considers them a threat and locks Root and Finch in the train.

Root destroys the train's window to escape and cuts the Machine's access to the doors so they can open them. However, the Machine responds by overloading her cochlear implant. They realize that the Machine deems them threats and is protecting itself from them. In order to avoid the Machine from attacking her, Root knocks herself out with desflurane. Meanwhile, after discarding all the pointless numbers, Reese takes the case of Laurie Granger (Paige Patterson), who surprisingly shows up at the police precinct. He leaves to help Finch and Root, but Granger is revealed to be an assassin and both start a gunfight in the streets. Finch discovers that the Machine sent Granger after Reese.

Finch tries to convince the Machine of their real personas, but eventually discovers that the Machine is experiencing everything as "Day $\mathbb{R}$" (in reference to the real numbers), especially the 42 times that Finch "killed" the Machine. Finch then shows the Machine all of their numbers they've saved throughout the years in an attempt to create a timeline for the Machine. This enables the Machine to add context to their actions and she's apologizes for her actions, but is unable to call off the hit on Reese, as it was paid on advance. Nevertheless, John subdues Granger and saves himself. At the same time, Fusco saves a family targeted by Lithuanian gangsters due to the husband's gambling debts.

With the Machine back, Finch asks for Grace's status, finding her in Venice. Having recovered Root's aliases, the team has a picnic in Central Park. The episode ends with ex-con Jeff Blackwell (Josh Close), one of the 30 numbers who was dismissed as someone who was not involved in any nefarious activity, asking for employment and be recruited by a Samaritan agent named Mona (LaChanze).

== Reception ==
=== Viewers ===
In its original American broadcast, "SNAFU" was seen by an estimated 5.80 million household viewers and gained a 1.0/4 ratings share among adults aged 18–49, according to Nielsen Media Research. This means that 1 percent of all households with televisions watched the episode, while 4 percent of all households watching television at that time watched it. This was a 22% decrease in viewership from the previous episode, which was watched by 7.35 million viewers with a 1.2/4 in the 18-49 demographics. With these ratings, Person of Interest was the fifth most watched show on CBS for the night, behind The Odd Couple, a The Big Bang Theory rerun and two Mike & Molly, third on its timeslot and tenth for the night in the 18-49 demographics, behind Castle, Gotham, Blindspot, The Odd Couple, a The Big Bang Theory rerun, two Mike & Molly episodes, Dancing with the Stars, and The Voice.

With Live +7 DVR factored in, the episode was watched by 8.27 million viewers with a 1.6 in the 18-49 demographics.

=== Critical reviews ===
"SNAFU" received very positive reviews from critics. Matt Fowler of IGN gave the episode a "great" 8.6 out of 10 rating and wrote in his verdict, "'SNAFU' gleefully turned Person of Interest's premise upside-down with a clever, funny episode that lovingly put our heroes through the wringer. It was this show's funniest episode to date, though it wasn't without teeth. The glitch the Machine experienced, on its own, made the show analyze itself a little bit. While also allowing us to re-experience some of our heroes' transformative journeys over the years."

Alexa Planje of The A.V. Club gave the episode an "A−" grade and wrote, "'SNAFU' is one of the best types of Person of Interest episodes, where the writers have fun playing with the show's central conceit. This approach often results in a great blend of both humor and drama, and this episode is no different."

Chancellor Agard of Entertainment Weekly wrote, "While I liked what the show was doing with this episode, it definitely felt like it slowed down the season's momentum already. It's still not clear what this phase of the war against Samaritan looks like and it would've been great if the episode has pushed that a little bit more."

Sean McKenna of TV Fanatic gave the episode a 4 star rating out of 5 and wrote "This was a decent enough episode, but I'm looking forward to getting back into the action now that the Machine has worked out some of its kinks. And thank goodness we won't have to wait long with the next episode on tomorrow!"
