= The Day the World Went Away (Person of Interest) =

- Person of Interest episode
- Episode no.: Season 5 Episode 10
- Directed by: Frederick E. O. Toye
- Written by: Andy Callahan & Melissa Scrivner Love
- Cinematography by: David Insley
- Editing by: Mark Conte & L.B. Brodie
- Production code: 3J6010
- Original air date: May 31, 2016
- Running time: 43 minutes

Guest appearances
- John Nolan as John Greer; Josh Close as Jeff Blackwell; Geoff Pierson as Agent Roberts; Robert Manning, Jr. as Zachary; Sunita Mani as Sonum; Christine Cartell as Brenda Jones; Enrico Colantoni as Carl Elias

Episode chronology
← Previous "Sotto Voce"	Next → "Synecdoche"

"The Day the World Went Away" is the 10th episode of the fifth season of the American television drama series Person of Interest. It is the 100th overall episode of the series and is written by Andy Callahan and co-executive producer Melissa Scrivner Love and directed by Frederick E. O. Toye. It aired on CBS in the United States and on CTV in Canada on May 31, 2016.

The series revolves around a computer program for the federal government known as "The Machine" that is capable of collating all sources of information to predict terrorist acts and to identify people planning them. A team follows "irrelevant" crimes: lesser level of priority for the government. However, their security and safety is put in danger following the activation of a new program named Samaritan. In the episode, Finch's cover is blown and the team tries to protect him while the war against Samaritan escalates. The episodes features the deaths of Carl Elias and Samantha "Root" Groves, who appeared in the show since the first season. The episode is named after Nine Inch Nails' song of the same name from the 1999 album The Fragile, the song also features at the end of the episode.

According to Nielsen Media Research, the episode was seen by an estimated 6.66 million household viewers and gained a 1.0/4 ratings share among adults aged 18–49. The episode received universal acclaim from critics, who praised the writing, directing, action, acting, twists and emotional impact. The scene where Finch provides a soliloquy received particular praise, with many deeming it one of the show's greatest moments.

== Plot ==
At a café, Finch (Michael Emerson) talks to the Machine through cameras. He has been thinking about his death and wonders if his friends will also die but receives no answer. A waitress tells him welcome back, which worries Finch that his identity may be exposed and leaves. He returns to the station where he talks with Root (Amy Acker) about his plans to close the Machine and decides to test if the Machine will get its own voice and name.

At his college's office, Finch is visited by Reese (Jim Caviezel) and Root, who tell him he is the Machine's newest number. They escape his office just as hitmen arrive. They move to the safe house with Elias (Enrico Colantoni), Shaw (Sarah Shahi) and Fusco (Kevin Chapman), where Shaw deduces that due to her return, Finch's cover was blown. Root then reveals to Finch that before he shut down the Machine, she gave it a self-defense program that only works if Finch activates it. As hitmen arrive, Elias takes Finch to another safe place while the rest of the team prepares to attack the hitmen.

Elias takes Finch to a high-rise building to avoid detection. There, Finch deduces that the café was where he had his first date with Grace, finding out that Samaritan now tracks their past actions. The rest of the team finds that the hitmen worked for the same company, "Temporary Resolutions" so Reese and Fusco go to the offices to investigate. They are ambushed by hitmen but manage to escape. Back at the high-rise building, hitmen locate Elias and Finch and Elias uses henchmen to evade them and get outside. However, during their runaway, Elias is killed by a shot in the head and Finch is captured.

Finch is brought before Greer (John Nolan), who intends to have him forcefully work on Samaritan. Root and Shaw locate him and start a gunfight with Greer's henchmen. Shaw stays behind to fend them off while Root and Finch escape. After a lengthy car chase, Root and Finch evade the hitmen. However, Jeff Blackwell (Josh Close) shoots from a rooftop to the car, intending to kill Finch but Root stands in the way and is wounded. They are forced to stop at a police roadblock where Finch is arrested while Root is taken to the hospital.

The police have Finch in custody, charged with treason committed in 1974. Questioned by an agent, a devastated Finch provides a soliloquy on how he intends to abandon the principles he has long followed and vows to kill Samaritan. As he is taken to his cell, he receives a call from a payphone: it's the Machine, with Root's voice. Fusco has discovered that Root didn't survive her wounds and died. Finch asks the Machine for help and she agrees to do it. The power goes off and all inmates escape. While Reese and Shaw inspect the area, they are informed by Fusco of Root's fate. They realize that Finch's number came up not just because he was a victim, but also because he's a perpetrator against Greer and Samaritan.

== Production ==
=== Writing ===
The episode featured the death of Samantha "Root" Groves, played by Amy Acker since the first season. Series creator Jonathan Nolan explained that her arc was planned since the second season and when they started working on the fifth season, he questioned "Look, this is the plan we had in mind. Do we really want to go this way?" They decided to incorporate the story after deciding at the beginning of production that the season would be its last. He also viewed the Machine's development, "It's not a cop-out, it's an evolution of a character, a Machine that has been, for five seasons, casting about looking for a voice for an avatar, and has settled, for three seasons now, on Root as its analog interface. Well, this is the ultimate evolution of that." Regarding the Machine's use of Root's voice, executive producer Greg Plageman said, "I feel like the Machine was Root's first love, in some ways, and the way she went out, protecting the father of the Machine and understanding the ultimate import of this in the world, is perfect. It's perfect." Talking about Finch's subsequent interrogation scene, Plageman added "We have to give that character license to and why and what does it mean? He's carried this tremendous baggage. The loss of so many people close to him - Nathan Ingram, pushing away Grace. Everyone close to him who's lost someone, it becomes a tipping point in the 100th episode. And to see that turn -- Michael Emerson is thrilling."

Amy Acker commented on her character's fate, explaining "It was really sad. I didn't quite know what the involvement was going to be necessarily when I became the voice of the Machine, but it actually ended up -- I was crying, 'I'm so sad to leave!', thinking I wasn't going to see everyone. And then the way that it worked out with the last three episodes, they were like, 'You're back!'" She also added, "Root's first love was The Machine and brought her into the world of all of these people to begin with. That's the great thing about Person of Interest. It's never been about sexuality. It's always just been about doing what you have to do for the people you love or for the things you love. I think this is another example of Root doing what she had to do to save all these people who she loves in her mind."

== Reception ==
=== Viewers ===
In its original American broadcast, "The Day the World Went Away" was seen by an estimated 6.66 million household viewers and gained a 1.0/4 ratings share among adults aged 18–49, according to Nielsen Media Research. This means that 1 percent of all households with televisions watched the episode, while 4 percent of all households watching television at that time watched it. This was a 21% increase in viewership from the previous episode, which was watched by 5.49 million viewers with a 0.8/3 in the 18-49 demographics. With these ratings, Person of Interest was the most watched show on CBS for the night, second on its timeslot and third for the night in the 18-49 demographics, behind Maya & Marty, and America's Got Talent.

With Live +7 DVR factored in, the episode was watched by 8.96 million viewers with a 1.5 in the 18-49 demographics.

=== Critical reviews ===
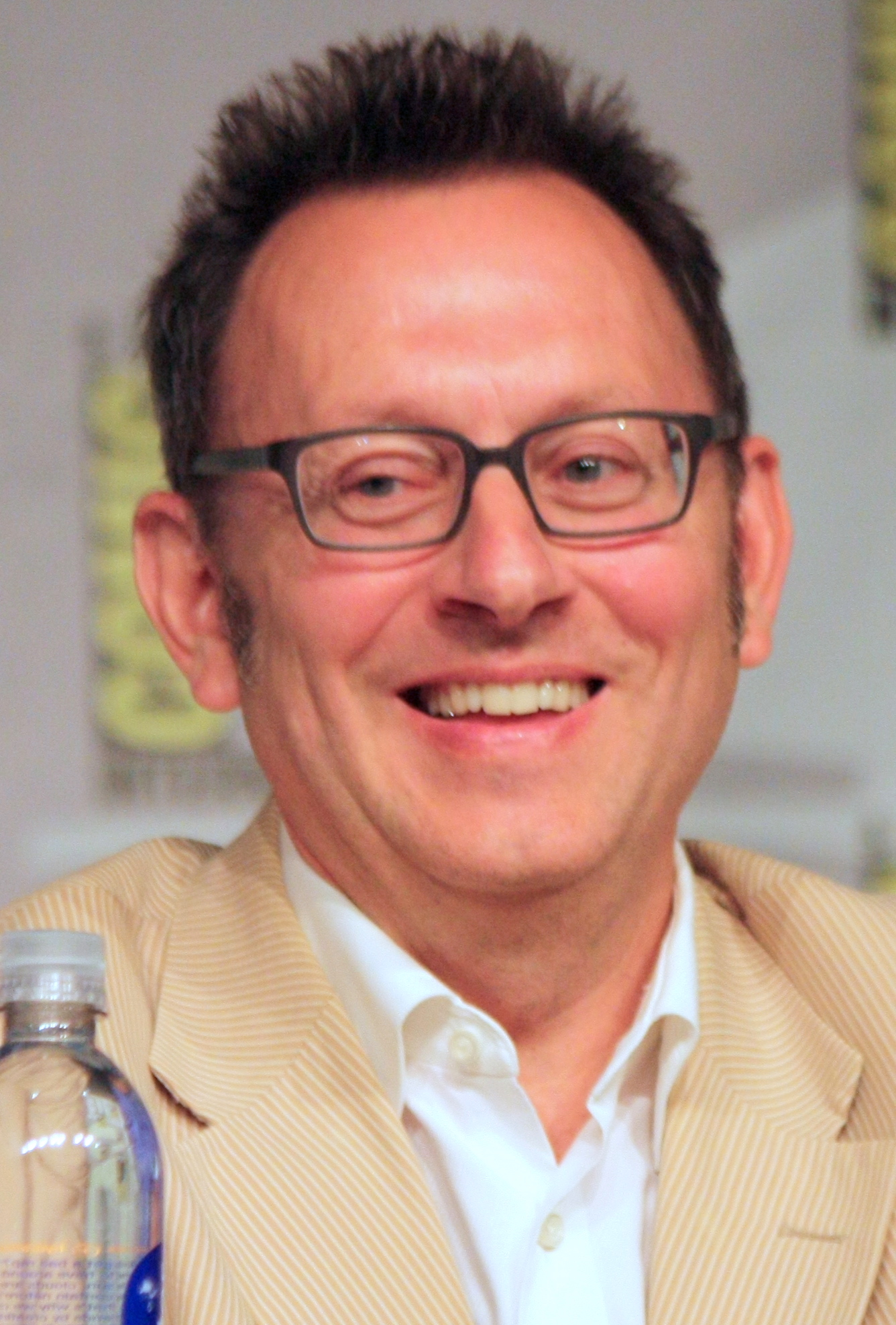
Michael Emerson's performance in the episode, particularly during his soliloquy, received widespread critical acclaim.

"The Day the World Went Away" received universal acclaim from critics. Matt Fowler of IGN gave the episode a perfect "masterpiece" 10 out of 10 rating and wrote in his verdict, "'The Day the World Went Away' was a mesmerizing and devastating gateway into Person of Interest's tragic endgame. Expertly executed, this chapter took some big players off the game board while setting Finch up for a very dark turn."

Alexa Planje of The A.V. Club gave the episode an "A" grade and wrote, "Some of the best episodes of the series are those that show off Person of Interest's range, balancing rich, philosophical dialogue with complex, thrilling action sequences. This is one of those episodes, and it's a great way to gear viewers up for the final showdown."

Chancellor Agard of Entertainment Weekly wrote, "'The Day the World Went Away' is a culmination of several seasons worth of work and is definitely a game-changer for the show in more ways than one."

Sean McKenna of TV Fanatic gave the episode a perfect 5 star rating out of 5 and wrote "'The Day the World Went Away' was a riveting, engaging and emotional hour of Person of Interest Season 5. I can only imagine how the final three episodes are going to play out."
