= Chris Fisher (director) =

American director, writer, and producer

- Occupations: Director, writer, producer
- Years active: 2002–present

Chris Fisher is an American director, writer, producer and attorney. He worked on the CBS television series Person of Interest as a director and executive producer.

== Career ==
Fisher began his career as a corporate lawyer in London before deciding to work in the entertainment industry. In 2001, Fisher established the production company Imperial Fish Company, which worked on his first film Nightstalker and the film Taboo.

Fisher has directed episodes of various TV series including Rampage: The Hillside Strangler Murders. On May 9, 2008, it was announced that he would direct S. Darko, the sequel to 2001's Donnie Darko, which was directed by Richard Kelly. Fisher received the script to S. Darko in full during the time of the 2007–2008 Writers Guild of America strike but was unable to work on it further as he was a WGA member himself. Ultimately, S. Darko proved to be a box office flop and was critically panned, receiving a score of 13% on Rotten Tomatoes based on negative reviews.

He wrote and directed mystery thriller Meeting Evil, which was released in 2012 and starred Luke Wilson and Samuel L. Jackson. It was adapted from Thomas Berger's 1992 novel of the same name. It received generally negative reviews, and it holds a 13% on Rotten Tomatoes.

== Filmography ==
=== Film ===
Year	Title	Director	Writer	Producer
2002	Taboo	No	Yes	Yes
2002	Spun	No	No	Associate
2002	Kiss the Bride	No	No	Co-Producer
2002	Nightstalker	Yes	Yes	Yes
2005	Dirty	Yes	Yes	No
2006	Rampage: The Hillside Strangler Murders	Yes	Yes	Yes
2009	S. Darko	Yes	No	No
2011	Street Kings 2: Motor City	Yes	No	No
2012	Meeting Evil	Yes	Yes	No

=== Television ===
Year	Title	Director	Writer	Producer	Directed Episodes
2007	Chuck	Yes	No	No	1.11 – "Chuck Versus the Crown Vic"
2007–2008	Moonlight	Yes	No	No	1.07 – "The Ringer"; 1.15 – "What's Left Behind"
2007–2010	Cold Case	Yes	No	No	4.18 – "A Dollar, A Dream"; 5.04 – "Devil Music"; 6.06 – "The Dealer"; 6.09 – "Pin Up Girl"; 7.02 – "Hood Rats"; 7.05 – "WASP"; 7.14 – "Metamorphosis"; 7.18 – "The Last Drive-In"
2009	The Cleaner	No	Yes	No	2.05 – "Split Ends"; 2.12 – "Crossing the Threshold"
2009–2010	Eureka	Yes	No	No	3.14 – "Ship Happens"; 4.08 – "The Ex-Files"
2010	Three Rivers	Yes	No	No	1.10 – "A Roll of the Dice"
2010–2011	Hawaii Five-O	Yes	No	No	1.12 – "Hana ʻaʻa Makehewa"; 1.14 – "He Kane Hewaʻole"
2010–2013	Warehouse 13	Yes	No	Supervising	2.05 – "13.1"; 3.05 – "3... 2... 1..."; 3.06 – "Don't Hate the Player"; 3.08 – "The 40th Floor"; 4.01 "A New Hope"; 4.06 – "Fractures"; 4.10 – "We All Fall Down"; 4.13 – "The Big Snag"; 4.17 – "What Matters Most"; 4.19 – "All the Time in the World"
2012–2016	Person of Interest	Yes	No	Executive	1.14 – "Wolf and Cub"; 2.12 – "Prisoner's Dilemma"; 2.14 – "One Percent"; 2.20 – "In Extremis"; 3.01 – "Liberty"; 3.10 – "The Devil's Share"; 3.22 – "A House Divided"; 3.23 – "Deus Ex Machina"; 4.02 – "Nautilus"; 4.08 – "Brotherhood"; 4.11 – "If-Then-Else"; 4.17 – "Karma"; 4.22 – "YHWH"; 5.01 – "B.S.O.D."; 5.02 – "SNAFU"; 5.04 – "6,741"; 5.13 – "return 0"
2013	The Bridge	Yes	No	No	1.07 – "Destino"
2016	Supergirl	Yes	No	No	1.17 – "Manhunter"
2017	Inhumans	Yes	No	No	1.03 – "Divide and Conquer"; 1.07 – "Havoc in the Hidden Land"
2017–2020	The Magicians	Yes	No	Executive	2.01 – "Knights of Crowns"; 2.02 – "Hotel Spa Potions"; 2.07 – "Plan B"; 2.12 – "Ramifications"; 2.13 – "We Have Brought You Little Cakes"; 3.01 – "The Tales of the Seven Keys"; 3.02 – "Heroes and Morons"; 3.13 – "Will You Play With Me?"; 4.01 – "A Flock of Lost Birds"; 4.02 – "Lost, Found, Fucked"; 4.13 – "No Better to be Safe Than Sorry"; 5.01 – "Do Something Crazy"; 5.02 – "The Wrath of the Times Bees"; 5.13 – "Fillory and Further"
2018	Taken	Yes	No	No	2.16 – "Viceroy"
2018	Runaways	Yes	No	No	2.02 – "Radio On"
2021	The Stand	Yes	No	No	1.05 – "Fear and Loathing in New Vegas"; 1.06 – "The Vigil"
2022–2025	The Equalizer	Yes	No	No	3.03 – "Gaslight"; 3.06 – "A Time to Kill"; 3.11 – "Never Again"; 5.02 – "Haunted Heights"; 5.07 – "Slay Ride"; 5.10 – "Dirty Sexy Money"
2022–2026	Star Trek: Strange New Worlds	Yes	No	Co-Executive	1.10 – "A Quality of Mercy"; 2.01 – "The Broken Circle"; 3.01 – "Hegemony, Part II"; 4.01 – "Valles Marineris"; 4.10 – "Tomorrow's Enterprise"
