= Sotto Voce (Person of Interest) =

- Person of Interest episode
- Episode no.: Season 5 Episode 9
- Directed by: Margot Lulick
- Written by: Sabir Pirzada
- Cinematography by: David Insley
- Editing by: Lola Popovac
- Production code: 3J6009
- Original air date: May 30, 2016
- Running time: 43 minutes

Guest appearances
- Neal Huff as Terry Easton; Rupak Ginn as Amir Siddiq; Teddy Canez as Raul; Marcus Ho as Officer Chen; Enrico Colantoni as Carl Elias

Episode chronology
← Previous "Reassortment"	Next → "The Day the World Went Away"

"Sotto Voce" is the 9th episode of the fifth season of the American television drama series Person of Interest. It is the 99th overall episode of the series and is written by Sabir Pirzada and directed by producer Margot Lulick. It aired on CBS in the United States and on CTV in Canada on May 30, 2016.

The series revolves around a computer program for the federal government known as "The Machine" that is capable of collating all sources of information to predict terrorist acts and to identify people planning them. A team follows "irrelevant" crimes: lesser level of priority for the government. However, their security and safety is put in danger following the activation of a new program named Samaritan. In the episode, the team must protect a locksmith who is extorted by a person to commit crimes. However, the team realizes that the person is none other than "The Voice" himself. The title refers to "Sotto voce", which is used to denote emphasis attained by lowering one's voice rather than raising it, similar to the effect provided by an aside.

According to Nielsen Media Research, the episode was seen by an estimated 5.49 million household viewers and gained a 0.8/3 ratings share among adults aged 18–49. The episode received very positive reviews from critics, who praised the writing, action scenes, character development and final scene.

== Plot ==
In Mexico, two men force a family to drop out of their truck in the desert after only getting paid a short amount of money. However, the men are subdued by Shaw (Sarah Shahi), who gives the keys to the truck to the family and leaves to walk on foot into the US.

Back in New York, Reese (Jim Caviezel) is following their new number: Terry Easton (Neal Huff), a locksmith. He sees Easton breaking into an investment firm, ready to detonate a bomb. Reese convinces him not do it and cuts the wires to the bomb. At the precinct, Easton explains that a person kidnapped his wife and he would only release her if he detonated the bomb. He then receives a call from the man, telling him he failed. Through the audio, Finch (Michael Emerson) discovers that the man is the same voice they already dealt with years ago.

Finch manages to find the wife's location and Reese leads a bomb squad to the building. However, he receives a call from The Voice, who is aware of his attempts and shows that it's a wrong location. But the location still had bombs, which injure the squad. Finch decides to ask Elias (Enrico Colantoni) for help, which he accepts and takes him to an elementary school to meet with one of his associates for information. Back at the precinct, Easton receives a phone and a knife from an unknown person and is instructed to open the cells with Templarios gang members but Reese stops him.

Due to bomb threats, Reese and Fusco (Kevin Chapman) are the only officers in the precinct as the Templarios start entering, looking for Amir Saddiq (Rupak Ginn), one of the criminals in Fusco's custody. Amir reveals that the Templarios were sent to kill him as he found out about The Voice's real identity. They lock Amir in a room while Reese and Fusco start a gunfight in the precinct with the Templarios. Meanwhile, Finch and Elias locate The Voice's center of operations and eventually find that Easton's wife does not exist. At the precinct, Easton is revealed to be The Voice and kills Amir before escaping. During their gunfight, Fusco saves Reese from being shot but receives a non-lethal injury.

Meanwhile, Shaw finds her way back to New York and is reunited with Root (Amy Acker). Root is overjoyed that Shaw is back, but Shaw, afraid of risking Root's life, threatens to shoot herself, simulation or not. Root threatens suicide as well, declaring that, if Shaw dies, they both die; Shaw withdraws.

Finch finally meets Easton on the street, abhorring his devious acts. Elias stops him from killing Finch and both call it a truce. However, as he drives away in his car, Elias kills him remotely with a car bomb. The next day, Reese and Fusco reconcile and Reese decides to tell him everything about Samaritan and the Machine. Reese and Fusco meet with Finch along the East River near the Queensboro Bridge. Root joins them, as well as Shaw, surprising the team, now fully back together again.

== Reception ==
=== Viewers ===
In its original American broadcast, "Sotto Voce" was seen by an estimated 5.49 million household viewers and gained a 0.8/3 ratings share among adults aged 18–49, according to Nielsen Media Research. This means that 0.8 percent of all households with televisions watched the episode, while 3 percent of all households watching television at that time watched it. This was an 11% increase in viewership from the previous episode, which was watched by 4.92 million viewers with a 0.9/3 in the 18-49 demographics. With these ratings, Person of Interest was the most watched show on CBS for the night, third on its timeslot and fourth for the night in the 18-49 demographics, behind So You Think You Can Dance, the Game 1 of the 2016 Stanley Cup Finals, The Bachelorette.

With Live +7 DVR factored in, the episode was watched by 7.84 million viewers with a 1.4 in the 18-49 demographics.

=== Critical reviews ===
"Sotto Voce" received very positive reviews from critics. Matt Fowler of IGN gave the episode a "great" 8.8 out of 10 rating and wrote in his verdict, "'Sotto Voce' wasn't an outright siege episode, but it was a cool action-packed labyrinthine puzzle. And a Samaritan-free one at that. By the end, Fusco knew the truth, Shaw returned (not quite right), and Finch made a 'deal with the devil' choice about how to handle this week's villain."

Alexa Planje of The A.V. Club gave the episode a "B+" grade and wrote, "Reunited and it feels so good. The climax of this episode has been a long time coming. The assembly of the entirety of Team Machine is very satisfying to see after such a long separation. Some elements of this reunion are more satisfying than others but overall, it's a welcome sight to behold. This isn't the only aspect of 'Sutto Voce' that feels nostalgic. In many ways, this episode is a reexamination of Person of Interest's central premise."

Chancellor Agard of Entertainment Weekly wrote, "Up to now, the final season has been pretty dark. Thankfully, 'Sotto Voce,' which is all about friendship and trust, lightens the mood a bit as we see two of our wayward Team Machine-mates work their way back into the fold."

Sean McKenna of TV Fanatic gave the episode a 4.6 star rating out of 5 and wrote "After all, while it's great we finally got the team all together, they may just need Elias one more time in their fight against Samaritan. It's not going to be an easy battle in this final episodes, but you can just feel things gearing up for the end, and I'm excited to see how it all goes down."
