= Truth Be Told (Person of Interest) =

- Person of Interest episode
- Episode no.: Season 5 Episode 3
- Directed by: Stephen Surjik
- Written by: Erik Mountain
- Cinematography by: David Insley
- Editing by: Lola Popovac
- Production code: 3J6003
- Original air date: May 10, 2016
- Running time: 44 minutes

Guest appearances
- Keith David as Agent Terence Beale; Annie Parisse as Agent Kara Stanton; Wrenn Schmidt as Dr. Iris Campbell; Stephen Plunkett as Alex Duncan; Darren Goldstein as Brent Tomlinson

Episode chronology
← Previous "SNAFU"	Next → "6,741"

"Truth Be Told" is the 3rd episode of the fifth season of the American television drama series Person of Interest. It is the 93rd overall episode of the series and is written by supervising producer Erik Mountain and directed by Stephen Surjik. It aired on CBS in the United States and on CTV in Canada on May 10, 2016.

The series revolves around a computer program for the federal government known as "The Machine" that is capable of collating all sources of information to predict terrorist acts and to identify people planning them. A team follows "irrelevant" crimes: lesser level of priority for the government. However, their security and safety is put in danger following the activation of a new program named Samaritan. In the episode, with the Machine now working properly, Reese must follow a man who tries to investigate his brother's death in the army. However, his brother is connected to Reese through a mission he was sent back in 2010.

According to Nielsen Media Research, the episode was seen by an estimated 7.34 million household viewers and gained a 1.1/4 ratings share among adults aged 18–49. The episode received generally positive reviews from critics, who praised Jim Caviezel's performance and character development although the closure to Beale's and Iris' storyline received more criticism.

== Plot ==
=== Flashbacks ===
In 2010, at the George Bush Center for Intelligence, Reese (Jim Caviezel) and Kara Stanton (Annie Parisse) are tasked by Supervising Agent Terence Beale (Keith David) to investigate about a soldier Brent Tomlinson (Darren Goldstein), who is suspected of having provided a FIM-92 Stinger to the Taliban. They confront him at his station and search through his belongings but find nothing. When Brent starts getting defensive, Reese kills him mid-sentence. Kara then finds money hidden beneath a briefcase and Reese explains he knew he was guilty due to his defensive manner. Kara then states that she knows why Beale picked him for the job: his absence of family and commitment.

=== Present day ===
After catching a criminal, Reese meets with Dr. Iris Campbell (Wrenn Schmidt) and her parents in a pirate-themed restaurant, where it seems everything ends well. Back at the station, he is briefed by Finch (Michael Emerson) on their newest number: Alex Duncan (Stephen Plunkett), who works at a firm called Anderson Rake Consulting.

Reese infiltrates ARC but due to Duncan's security position, is unable to clone his phone. He later sees Duncan breaking into his supervisor's office and steal files. Reese follows him in the streets and sees as Duncan is taken by CIA agents, including Beale. Reese tries to intervene but Finch tells him not do it or it will blow his cover. Reese uses a ski mask to save Duncan but Beale recognizes his eyes and skills, deducing his identity. Meanwhile, the Machine sends Root (Amy Acker) to pose as a delivery person and realizes that Samaritan has been using malware to infect the firmware of electronic devices. With Finch's help, Root runs the malware on an airgapped laptop disconnected from any external sources.

Reese takes Duncan to a hotel, where he says he was looking for information regarding his brother Paul's death in the army. Reese discovers that Paul was an agent for The Pentagon working undercover in the army and his real name was Brent Tomlinson, the man he killed. Unwilling to reveal his role in the assassination, Reese helps Duncan in finding more information on what his brother investigated. He uses Finch to act as a decoy and distract Beale while Reese and Duncan get more files from his office. They find that Paul was involved an illegal Pentagon-CIA operation named "Desert Rain" that could've exposed high ranking government officials. However, they are captured by Beale and his henchmen.

Beale reveals Reese's connection to Paul but Reese affirms he questioned and they left as they thought he was innocent. To protect his actions, Beale backs up Reese's claim. Reese then crashes the car and despite having Beale at gunpoint, he lets him live and parts with Duncan. The next day, Reese and Beale run into each other, where Reese says that Duncan was sent away and Beale won't pursue him or Reese will reveal "Desert Rain" to the public. Beale accepts, as well as deciding to keep Reese's status unchanged, admitting that he likes the idea that Reese is still out there. Feeling his past will never let go of him, Reese breaks up with Iris as the war with Samaritan will require him to be his past version of himself and he won't be able to have a normal life. After Iris leaves, Finch calls him to inform him of another number coming up and Reese heads there.

== Reception ==
=== Viewers ===
In its original American broadcast, "Truth Be Told" was seen by an estimated 7.34 million household viewers and gained a 1.1/4 ratings share among adults aged 18–49, according to Nielsen Media Research. This means that 1.1 percent of all households with televisions watched the episode, while 4 percent of all households watching television at that time watched it. This was a 26% increase in viewership from the previous episode, which was watched by 5.80 million viewers with a 1.0/4 in the 18-49 demographics. With these ratings, Person of Interest was the third most watched show on CBS for the night, behind NCIS: New Orleans, and NCIS, second on its timeslot and seventh for the night in the 18-49 demographics, behind The Flash, Chicago Fire, Chicago Med, NCIS: New Orleans, The Voice, and NCIS.

With Live +7 DVR factored in, the episode was watched by 9.90 million viewers with a 1.7 in the 18-49 demographics.

=== Critical reviews ===
"Truth Be Told" received generally positive reviews from critics. Matt Fowler of IGN gave the episode a "good" 7.8 out of 10 rating and wrote in his verdict, "'Truth Be Told,' despite only just now introducing a huge character from Reese's past, had some good thing going for it. The idea of the CIA learning that Reese was still alive felt really cool and I was all for an episode tackling Reese's dark past since the last episode, 'SNAFU,' also made use of it. But the payoff here, with both Beal and Iris, felt flat."

Alexa Planje of The A.V. Club gave the episode an "A−" grade and wrote, "These may not have been the riskiest episodes of Person of Interest, but they successfully furthered the plotting established in the premiere and expanded on the show's favorite themes. Not too shabby."

Chancellor Agard of Entertainment Weekly wrote, "While I find this exploration interesting, I just wish there was more urgency to the proceedings in this episode. There must have been a way to take us down this road in a way that moved the story of this shortened final season along a bit further. 'Truth Be Told' kind of feels like the show is stuck in a bit of a holding pattern. But that's not to say this wasn't an enjoyable episode."

Sean McKenna of TV Fanatic gave the episode a 3.5 star rating out of 5 and wrote "While I liked getting some flashbacks and the focus on Reese, this was just an OK episode. Though I'm sure, things are going to start picking up again real fast."
