= ShotSeeker =

- Person of Interest episode
- Episode no.: Season 5 Episode 5
- Directed by: Maja Vrvilo
- Written by: Andy Callahan
- Cinematography by: David Insley
- Editing by: Mark Conte
- Production code: 3J6004
- Original air date: May 17, 2016
- Running time: 43 minutes

Guest appearances
- James LeGros as Bruce Moran; Josh Close as Jeff Blackwell; Will Connolly as Ethan Garvin; Brit Whittle as Benjamin Haas; Peter Gray Lewis as J.D. Carrick

Episode chronology
← Previous "6,741"	Next → "A More Perfect Union"

"ShotSeeker" is the 5th episode of the fifth season of the American television drama series Person of Interest. It is the 95th overall episode of the series and is written by Andy Callahan and directed by Maja Vrvilo. It aired on CBS in the United States and on CTV in Canada on May 17, 2016.

The series revolves around a computer program for the federal government known as "The Machine" that is capable of collating all sources of information to predict terrorist acts and to identify people planning them. A team follows "irrelevant" crimes: lesser level of priority for the government. However, their security and safety is put in danger following the activation of a new program named Samaritan. In the episode, the team investigates a NYPD analyst who gets himself involved in a conflict with Samaritan after finding a secret project that a close friend worked at before her disappearance. Despite being credited, Sarah Shahi does not appear in the episode.

According to Nielsen Media Research, the episode was seen by an estimated 6.97 million household viewers and gained a 1.1/4 ratings share among adults aged 18–49. The episode received positive reviews from critics, who praised the acting (particularly Kevin Chapman) and writing. Critics specially reacted positively to Enrico Colantoni's return.

== Plot ==
Reese (Jim Caviezel) is following their new number: Ethan Garvin (Will Connolly), a NYPD analyst who works at the Real Time Crime Center. Garvin works at an acoustic surveillance system named "ShotSeeker", a program that detects gunshots in the city for the police. Meanwhile, Finch (Michael Emerson) and Root (Amy Acker) engineer a series of simulations in a Faraday cage between a small clone of the Machine and that of Samaritan to know any possible outcome of their fight.

Reese follows Garvin to an apartment, where he breaks in an apartment and shoots near a chimney. Reese confronts him and Garvin explains that the owner of the apartment, Krupa Naik, reported gunshots, which ShotSeeker deemed to be false. However, Garvin analyzed the gunshots and discovered they were real and Krupa has disappeared. At a park, Fusco (Kevin Chapman) is approached by Bruce Moran (James LeGros), Elias' associate. Moran demands to know the truth behind Elias' shooting and tells Fusco that he needs to talk with Reese, threatening Fusco's son's life. Fusco expresses his concern to Reese, who agrees to help with Moran while Fusco helps Garvin.

Fusco and Garvin interrogate Benjamin Haas (Brit Whittle), founder of a non-profit organization who reveals that Krupa worked with him on a project but the project's file was stolen on the night of her disappearance. As they leave, ShotSeeker reports that Garvin fired gunshots in the area and Fusco and Garvin are taken by the authorities, although they are immediately released. Meanwhile, Reese meets with Moran and threatens him to leave Fusco alone. He meets with Garvin to meet with Krupa's neighbor, Mary, who wants to talk. However, Mary has been killed and Reese fails to get to the hitman, who is working with Samaritan. Reese is then knocked out by hitmen and is captured.

As the Machine is unable to find Reese, Fusco decides to use all of the police resources to find him, despite knowing it would put him on Samaritan's radar. Root decides to investigate a hard drive that contains Krupa's project. She finds the hard drive at her apartment but fights with Samaritan operative Jeff Blackwell (Josh Close). However, Blackwell allows her to go as he is unaware of Samaritan's purpose and existence. With Garvin in police custody, Samaritan then starts sending hitmen to the precinct to eliminate him but Fusco holds them off. In order to protect Garvin, Finch and Root decide to leak Krupa's project to the public. Due to his behavior, Fusco is deemed a "potential obstructionist" by Samaritan.

Reese is taken to a barbershop to meet with his captor, Moran. Reese subdues his henchmen but offers Moran the chance to know the truth. Finch and Reese take Moran to a safe house where an alive but bed-ridden Elias (Enrico Colantoni) is staying. He encourages Moran to go back to the shadows and embrace them. Finch then tells Reese that the Machine has produced 10 billion possible outcomes and in each one of them, the Machine loses to Samaritan.

== Production ==
=== Development ===
In October 2015, it was announced that the fifth episode of the season would be titled "ShotSeeker" and that it would be written by Andy Callahan with Mara Vrvilo serving as director. Despite being the fourth episode produced for the season, it was the fifth to air.

== Reception ==
=== Viewers ===
In its original American broadcast, "ShotSeeker" was seen by an estimated 6.97 million household viewers and gained a 1.1/4 ratings share among adults aged 18–49, according to Nielsen Media Research. This means that 1.1 percent of all households with televisions watched the episode, while 4 percent of all households watching television at that time watched it. This was a 31% increase in viewership from the previous episode, which was watched by 5.31 million viewers with a 0.9/3 in the 18-49 demographics. With these ratings, Person of Interest was the third most watched show on CBS for the night, behind NCIS: New Orleans and NCIS, second on its timeslot and seventh for the night in the 18-49 demographics, behind The Flash, Chicago Med, Chicago Fire, The Voice, NCIS: New Orleans, and NCIS.

With Live +7 DVR factored in, the episode was watched by 9.45 million viewers with a 1.6 in the 18-49 demographics.

=== Critical reviews ===
"ShotSeeker" received positive reviews from critics. Matt Fowler of IGN gave the episode a "great" 8.5 out of 10 rating and wrote in his verdict, "At the heart of 'ShotSeeker' was Fusco's crusade to learn the truth and Finch's idea to pit mini-Samaritan against a mini-Machine (a decision that became depressing in retrospect). We never learned what Samaritan's overall issue with the frozen powered-produce idea, and I really liked that. Samaritan is going to be dealing with thousands of things at once that it doesn't like about the state of the world and the ambiguity there is fascinating. Because, while dangerous to our heroes (and 'irrelevants'), Samaritan supposedly does have humanity's greater interests in mind. AND YAY ELIAS!"

Alexa Planje of The A.V. Club gave the episode a "B+" grade and wrote, "After such a character-driven and thematically-rich episode, Person of Interest switches gears yet again. A number of the week episode doesn't just end up coinciding with the show's overarching story; it sets up a plethora of new factors that will figure into the upcoming war."

Chancellor Agard of Entertainment Weekly wrote, "Person of Interest had no problem following up on last night's outstanding outing, '6,741.' 'ShotSeeker' builds on some of the work done by the previous episode as it continues to push the show into darker territory."

Sean McKenna of TV Fanatic gave the episode a 4.3 star rating out of 5 and wrote "This was a solid episode that highlighted again the power of Samaritan and just how stacked the odds are against the POI team. Things are sure to keep heating up, and hopefully, the POI team can find some way to take down its biggest enemy."
