= Person of Interest season 4 =

Season of television series

Person of Interest
- Season 4
- Home media cover art
- Starring: Jim Caviezel; Kevin Chapman; Amy Acker; Sarah Shahi; Michael Emerson
- No. of episodes: 22

Release
- Original network: CBS
- Original release: September 23, 2014 – May 5, 2015

Season chronology
- ← Previous; Season 3 Next → Season 5

The fourth season of the American television series Person of Interest premiered on September 23, 2014. The season is produced by Kilter Films, Bad Robot, and Warner Bros. Television, with Jonathan Nolan, Greg Plageman, J. J. Abrams, and Bryan Burk serving as executive producers and Plageman serving as showrunner.

The series was renewed for a fourth season in March 2014 and stars Jim Caviezel, Kevin Chapman, Amy Acker, Sarah Shahi and Michael Emerson. The series revolves around a team led by a mysterious reclusive billionaire computer programmer, Harold Finch, who has developed a computer program for the federal government known as "the Machine" that is capable of collating all sources of information to predict terrorist acts and to identify people planning them, as well as detecting all lesser crimes, known as "irrelevant" crimes. The focus of the season involves the team's fight against Samaritan, a mass surveillance system that aims to destroy the Machine.

The season premiered on September 23, 2014, on CBS and ended on May 5, 2015. Viewership for the season averaged 12.22 million viewers, ranking as the 21st most watched series of the 2014–15 television season. The season received highly positive reviews from critics, with the writing, performances and Samaritan's thematic value garnering praise. One of its episodes, "If-Then-Else", received near-unanimous praise from critics and audience and was deemed one of the series' best episodes. In May 2015, CBS renewed the series for a fifth season, which would be later announced to be the final season.

== Season summary ==
After the events of the previous season, the team is living separately in hiding. They continue to work on cases, but must now also evade Samaritan, which lacks the restrictions and human-oriented perspective Finch built into the Machine, and which is seeking to resolve perceived problems of human violence by reshaping society, sometimes violently. Samaritan manipulates the NSA, fixes elections, triggers stock market crashes, kills those seen as threats, changes data to gain results perceived as beneficial, buys useful corporations, and continues building an organization to support its own goals.

Samaritan and the Machine meet via human proxies as the only two of their kind, and discuss their essential differences, disagreeing strongly on whether freewill or firm guidance is more beneficial to humanity. They part with the understanding that Samaritan will seek to destroy the Machine, and Samaritan engineers a general electrical failure across the entire United States to do so. Samaritan operatives capture Shaw, leading to a brief search by Reese and Root before the Machine instructs them to stop. As Finch finishes copying the Machine's core systems into a temporary portable storage system, it apologizes to Finch for its failure to prevent the present situation, expresses concern that it may have made poor choices under unforeseen circumstances and gratitude for its creation, and ceases to function. The team then leaves in order to face more Samaritan operatives, preparing for their last stand.

== Cast and characters ==
=== Main ===
- Jim Caviezel as John Reese
- Kevin Chapman as Detective Lionel Fusco
- Amy Acker as Samantha Groves/Root
- Sarah Shahi as Sameen Shaw
- Michael Emerson as Harold Finch

=== Recurring ===
- John Nolan as John Greer
- Cara Buono as Martine Rousseau
- Winston Duke as Dominic Besson
- Enrico Colantoni as Carl Elias
- Wrenn Schmidt as Dr. Iris Campbell
- Andreas Damm as Romeo
- Jamie Hector as Lincoln "Link" Cordell
- Annie Ilonzeh as Harper Rose
- Jessica Pimentel as Floyd
- John Doman as Ross Garrison
- Camryn Manheim as Control
- Nick Tarabay as Devon Grice
- David Valcin as Anthony S. Marconi/Scarface
- Adria Arjona as Dani Silva
- Oakes Fegley as Gabriel Hayward
- Jessica Hecht as Elizabeth Bridges
- Luke Kleintank as Caleb Phipps
- Julian Ovenden as Jeremy Lambert
- Quinn Shephard as Claire Mahoney
- Paige Turco as Zoe Morgan
- Theodora Woolley as Brooks
- Brett Cullen as Nathan Ingram
- Taraji P. Henson as Joss Carter
- Robert Manning, Jr. as Zachary
- Elizabeth Marvel as Alicia Corwin
- Al Sapienza as Detective Raymond Terney

=== Notable guests ===
- Navid Negahban as Ali Hasan
- Ryan O'Nan as Andre Cooper
- Jason Ritter as Simon Lee
- Adrian Bellani as Tomas Koroa
- James Le Gros as Bruce Moran
- Michael Gaston as Mike Richelli
- Michael Potts as Travers
- William Jackson Harper as Strobel
- Maddie Corman as Leslie Thompson
- Blair Brown as Emma Blake
- Bella Dayne as Anna Mueller
- Heléne Yorke as Lauren Buchanan
- Patrick Kennedy as Dr. Shane Edwards
- Katheryn Winnick as Frankie Wells
- Aasif Mandvi as Sulaiman Khan
- Zachary Booth as Chase Patterson

== Episodes ==
No. overall	No. in season	Title	Directed by	Written by	Original release date	Prod. code	U.S. viewers (millions)
69	1	"Panopticon"	Richard J. Lewis	Erik Mountain & Greg Plageman	September 23, 2014	3J5401	10.58
The team adopts cover identities in the wake of Samaritan's rise. The Machine provides Reese the number of Ali Hasan, who has built a communications network VHF television antennas across New York that cannot be traced by Samaritan. When a street gang known as "the Brotherhood" forces Hasan to set up a network for them, Hasan attempts to assassinate one of the leaders via a bomb placed in a burner phone. In retaliation, the Brotherhood kidnaps Hasan's son; Reese hires Elias to recover him. Finch gives Reese a phone belonging to Hasan's invisible network. A Samaritan agent named Martine Rousseau arrives in New York to eliminate threats to Samaritan. The Machine leads Finch to a new hideout inside an abandoned Interborough Rapid Transit Company station. Reese, via his cover identity as an NYPD detective, is placed on the 8th precinct's homicide task force.
70	2	"Nautilus"	Chris Fisher	Dan Dietz & Melissa Scrivner Love	September 30, 2014	3J5402	10.72
Reese and Finch work to save the life of Claire Mahoney, a talented young mathematician who is heavily involved in solving a nautilus-themed cryptographic puzzle, a recruitment tool used to find gifted minds. Claire is unaware that Silverpool, a private military firm is targeting her for stealing files associated with the game. Finch learns that Samaritan is running the game and attempts to warn Claire against continuing. Claire ignores him and completes the game; she is held at gunpoint by Silverpool operatives who force her to hand over the stolen documents, only to be shot dead by snipers. Samaritan recognizes Claire as an asset, while Claire's documents expose Silverpool's atrocities, thereby eliminating a potential competitor to Samaritan. Finch shows Reese and Shaw the team's new hideout.
71	3	"Wingman"	Frederick E.O. Toye	Amanda Segel	October 7, 2014	3J5403	9.64
The Machine's next number, wingman Andre Cooper, is discovered by Fusco to be preparing to testify against former mob associates who are now targeting him. Reese and Shaw rescue Fusco and Cooper from the mobsters' captivity. Finch and Root infiltrate a black market for weapons sales. Root subdues a group of Latvian gang members buying an AT4 anti-tank weapon; she and Finch uncover the mob's stash of money and weaponry, which they decide to use for their own work.
72	4	"Brotherhood"	Chris Fisher	Denise Thé	October 14, 2014	3J5404	9.72
Reese is assigned to the case of a drug deal gone bad between a gang of Armenians and "The Brotherhood", who were introduced in "Panopticon". The team's latest numbers belong to siblings Malcolm and Tracie Booker, who stole the drug money from the scene to bail their imprisoned mother out of jail. While Reese works with a DEA agent to protect the kids, Finch consults Elias about the Brotherhood's elusive leader Dominic. Shaw abducts an injured Brotherhood soldier, nicknamed "Mini" (Winston Duke), from the scene of the drug deal. The DEA agent is revealed to be a mole working for Dominic, who leaves Reese and the kids to face a Brotherhood assault. Fusco saves Reese, but Malcolm tries to make a deal with Dominic's right-hand man, Link (Jamie Hector), to protect his sister. Reese saves Malcolm, while Shaw forces Link to free Reese under the threat of burning the gang's heroin stash that Mini led her to. Shaw agrees to let Mini go, and he is picked up by Link. Mini reveals himself to in fact be Dominic and kills the DEA agent, ordering The Brotherhood to release the kids' mother as part of a campaign to induce gratitude.
73	5	"Prophets"	Kenneth Fink	Lucas O'Connor	October 21, 2014	3J5405	9.40
The Machine produces the number of Simon Lee (Jason Ritter), a brilliant political pollster and member of New York Governor James Murray's reelection campaign. Despite Lee's prediction, Murray loses, leaving Lee suspicious of the election result. The team discovers that the election upset is the result of vote rigging by Samaritan and that it wants Lee dead to tidy up loose ends. A series of flashbacks show the process Finch and Ingram went through to create The Machine. Reese is scheduled to attend therapy sessions because of his tendency to shoot people on the job. Root reveals to Finch that since Samaritan's activation, The Machine ceased talking, leaving her without guidance and afraid. Samaritan operatives led by Martine find the hotel where Lee is hiding. Despite being shot by Martine, Root manages to divert Samaritan's focus from Lee. Finch and Shaw produce fake data to convince Lee that his prediction was incorrect, causing Samaritan to disregard him. Reese tells his therapist why he feels compelled to save people, referring to his failure to save Carter. Greer and Martine discuss Samaritan's plans to gain political control. Finch indicates to The Machine his desire to communicate with it.
74	6	"Pretenders"	Stephen Surjik	Ashley Gable	October 28, 2014	3J5406	9.72
The team receive the number of Walter Dang (Erik Jensen), a worker at an insurance company. Finch has to travel to Hong Kong to present a paper at a conference. Walter is investigating the death of truck driver Abel Mindler, who apparently committed suicide. He gets dragged into a gang war between Elias and the unknown adversaries. It is later shown that Abel was smuggling high explosive weapons to the same gang. The gang abducts Walter for the location of the truck which Abel drove and then ditched, once he realized what he was smuggling; but the team intervenes. Elias meets with Dominic, and it is shown that Dominic was the mastermind behind the guns as he wanted to shift the balance of power. At the conference, Finch meets Elizabeth Bridges (Jessica Hecht), a small tech company owner, and the two bond. They are mugged on the way to the hotel. Discovering the thief's workplace, they go there, where Finch incapacitates him. As the conference ends, Finch pays him, revealing that he staged it to place a software on Bridges's laptop. As Bridges leaves, she calls a potential investor, who is revealed to be a Samaritan operative.
75	7	"Honor Among Thieves"	Sylvain White	David Slack	November 11, 2014	3J5407	9.11
The latest number is Tomas Koroa (Gerardo Celasco), a wine dealer who is also an international thief. Shaw joins his gang. They rob a safe, which unexpectedly contains a deadly virus (Marburg, or "MARV"). The other members try to kill Tomas. Shaw intervenes, but they take the vials. Shaw tracks the virus to a secure storage facility and realizes that two government operatives are doing the same thing. One of them is her former apprentice, Devon Grice (Nick E. Tarabay). Shaw and Tomas break into the storage facility, but are confronted by one of Tomas' teammates, who was behind the virus theft in the first place. They escape with the vials, but Grice apprehends them. He lets them go, deleting the CCTV video. Samaritan retrieves the video and starts repairing it. Root and Finch investigate software engineer Jared Wilkins, founder of new nonprofit OTPS, who received a $12 million grant from Governor Dawson (from "Prophets"). OTPS is an effort to give every New York student a tablet for educational use. Believing the tablets to be powered by Samaritan software, they plant a virus which ultimately destroys the building.
76	8	"Point of Origin"	Richard J. Lewis	Tony Camerino	November 18, 2014	3J5408	9.87
The latest number is NYPD recruit Dani Silva (Adria Arjona). She is spying on her fellow recruits, though further analysis proves that Silva is not hunting them, but is instead already a cop from Internal Affairs, working undercover in the academy trying to expose a suspected mole. The mole is Silva's fellow recruit and friend, Alex Ortiz, who is acting on orders of the Brotherhood. Ortiz steals Silva's files from her handler and then murders him, framing Silva for the crime. Ortiz also steals files from the academy's commandant for Dominic. The group retrieves Ortiz from a local drug cartel in Spanish Harlem and escapes while Dominic has the cartel leader executed. Ortiz's confession exonerates Silva and improves Reese's standing in front of Internal Affairs. Elsewhere, Samaritan has processed the retrieved security footage (from "Honor Among Thieves"), producing a somewhat blurry picture of a person (Shaw), but identifies Tomas instead. In response, Martine is sent to identify the person, who interrogates Katya, Tomas' last remaining associate; and tortures Romeo for information on Shaw. The two make eye contact at the department store where Shaw works and recognize each other as agents of the opposing AI.
77	9	"The Devil You Know"	Richard J. Lewis	Erik Mountain	November 25, 2014	3J5409	9.04
Martine engages in a gunfight with Shaw, who ultimately escapes thanks to Root. Martine learns that Fusco had stopped the truck that Root and Shaw used to escape, on a suspicion of Narcotics possession. Pretending to be a DEA agent, Martine questions Fusco about it, but he sees through the ruse and gives her a false lead. Reese and Finch deal with their latest number, Elias. Dominic gets many of Elias's people to turn on him in exchange for promises of expanded territory and power under The Brotherhood. Reese steps in to defend Elias and, during the process of evading Dominic, Anthony is captured and later killed in a suicide bombing. Greer and Martine deduce that Samaritan has a "blind spot" somehow caused by The Machine. Martine is given command of a group of Decima agents to hunt down Shaw. Meanwhile, Dominic has deduced that there is an extra-legal team helping Elias—he has two of the players figured out (Shaw and Reese), with the bankroller's place (Harold) still a large question mark. Elias vows revenge for the death of Anthony, and warns Reese to stay out of the way once that day comes.
78	10	"The Cold War"	Michael Offer	Amanda Segel	December 16, 2014	3J5410	8.94
To bring The Machine out of hiding, Samaritan showcases its strength by eliminating crime in New York City for a whole day. John finds out that Samaritan has learned how to deal with irrelevant numbers and has managed to prevent a series of crimes which would otherwise be taken care of by The Machine. Samaritan's actions leave Harold and his team with a difficult choice. When The Machine decides not to communicate with Samaritan, Samaritan changes course, bringing New York City to a halt by allowing crime to dramatically increase. When The Machine agrees, Root (acting as The Machine's voice) meets with Samaritan's representative, a young boy. It becomes clear that The Machine will not back down, while Samaritan is set on destroying it. Shaw leaves the Subway to help Root and the others while Samaritan engineers a stock market crash on Wall Street. A series of flashbacks show Greer's past as an MI6 agent. When Greer is assigned to kill a KGB agent, he discovers that the KGB agent is also an MI6 agent and that his deputy director, Blackwood, is a double agent. Overcome with anger, Greer kills Blackwood and severs his ties with MI6.
79	11	"If-Then-Else"	Chris Fisher	Denise Thé	January 6, 2015	3J5411	10.08
The team go to install software at the stock exchange that will stabilize the market. However, they are almost immediately intercepted by Samaritan operatives, who corner them in a room. Out of options, the team turns to The Machine, who in a matter of seconds provides a multitude of projections and outcomes in each. While doing so, it reflects on multiple chess matches it played and the lessons it learned with Finch in 2003. In a final simulation, The Machine projects a roughly 2% chance of survival and instructs the team to follow it. Shaw is stuck on a subway train with a stock market exchange manager with a security code to the exchange's server room. However, she is interrupted by a would-be suicide bomber who she kills in the first two simulations (and thus gets herself arrested) but talks down in the final and ultimate outcome. After sending the code to Root, she arrives as the two teams clash, opting to hold the Samaritan operatives off as Finch, Reese, Fusco, and Root escape. She traps them in the elevator, but Martine shoots Shaw multiple times before approaching her as the elevator doors slam to a close.
80	12	"Control-Alt-Delete"	Stephen Surjik	Andy Callahan	January 13, 2015	3J5412	10.16
During a mission to eliminate four suspected terrorists, ISA operatives (including Brooks and Grice from "Honor Among Thieves") eliminate three while the fourth, Yasin Said, escapes with his laptop. When Control requests access to the laptop's contents, Samaritan denies the request. Suspicious of Samaritan's actions, Control orders Brooks and Grice to make recovering the laptop their highest priority. But when they do so, Said escapes and the laptop self-destructs. Reese and Root, who have been hunting for Shaw, kidnaps Control. Root tortures Control for information on Shaw, but Control denies having any knowledge. Harold realizes that Control herself has been kept out of Samaritan's plans. Harold uploads a worm to one of the cellphones of the ISA operatives who came to rescue Control. Control tracks Yasin to Canada. He reveals that he won the Nautilus puzzle (from "Nautilus") and he wrote some software for an anonymous corporation. Control kills Yasin, but her actions leave a hint of doubt in her mind. The young boy acting as Samaritan's representative approaches White House and demands for a meeting with the President. Control visits the site of the shootout between Harold's team and the Samaritan operatives at the New York Stock Exchange.
81	13	"M.I.A."	Kevin Bray	Lucas O'Connor	February 3, 2015	3J5413	9.28
Root and Reese travel to the remote (and fictional) upstate town of Maple in search of Shaw. The two find a truck with a stretcher and medical equipment inside, leading them to a doctor; who was anonymously consulted for the job, but did not call the police since Maple has a history of job losses for those who ask too many questions. Root and Reese realize that Samaritan is experimenting with Maple as an "ant farm" to study human nature. After kidnapping and interrogating Maple's mayor Leslie Thompson, she leads them to the factory where Shaw was last seen, but Reese and Root instead find a secretary from the stock exchange, one of many innocent people who Samaritan is experimenting on with neural implants. Fusco and Dani Silva (from "Point of Origin") investigate The Machine's next number, one Arthur Weiss, a seemingly unsuspecting citizen revealed as a freelance assassin. They lure him into Silva's home and engage in a fight, with Silva shooting him to save Fusco, thus making her first kill. The Machine sends the team a coded message telling them to stop looking for Shaw. Elsewhere, Shaw is revealed to be alive and in Greer's captivity.
82	14	"Guilty"	Kate Woods	David Slack	February 10, 2015	3J5414	9.53
Harold is summoned for jury duty in the trial of a man charged with murdering his wife, the former CEO of a cellphone development company. Harold provokes the judge to get rejected from the panel, but is brought into it anyway. He is seated next to a former schoolteacher named Emma (Blair Brown), who turns out to be The Machine's next number. The team initially concludes that she is a perpetrator, being coerced to "fix" the trial; but later realizes she is supposed to convince the jury to vote "guilty". Harold stalls to get a "not guilty" verdict while Reese and Zoe Morgan try to deduce the real story. The jury is sequestered in a hotel, and one of the jurors attempts to kill Harold, but Reese intervenes. The man is actually a plant by the real perpetrator, the new CEO of the company. The murder was to prevent the dead CEO from withdrawing an expensive product which was deemed to be unsafe. The new developments lead to dismissal of charges, and the real perpetrator is arrested. Fusco tells Reese to stop shutting him out. Zoe realizes there's a growing attraction between Reese and his counselor.
83	15	"Q&A"	Stephen Semel	Dan Dietz	February 17, 2015	3J5415	9.17
Reese and Finch work to save the life of Anna Mueller, a software programmer at Fetch and Retrieve. She is being targeted because she expressed concern over the results VAL, a mobile app designed to aid users, is giving to people with depression that has resulted in suicides. Finch discovers a nautilus during the investigation and is contacted by Claire Mahoney (from "Nautilus") who tells him that she had recovered some source code from Samaritan and wants him to use it on his laptop, but he's suspicious. Later, Claire reveals herself to be a Samaritan agent and leads Finch at gunpoint to a school run by Samaritan to convince him to join, but he refuses. Root rescues him from the agents and shoots Claire, who escapes and hands Finch's laptop to Greer. Back at Fetch and Retrieve, Calvin Mazer, the CTO, holds Fusco and the CEO Lauren Buchanan at gunpoint and reveals that he altered VAL's source code to target people with depression, gambling problems and debt, for the sake of the advertisers. Reese rescues them, and Calvin is arrested. The next day, Greer attends a board meeting at Fetch and Retrieve.
84	16	"Blunt"	Frederick E.O. Toye	Amanda Segel & Greg Plageman	February 24, 2015	3J5416	9.63
Reese works to save the life of grifter Harper Rose (Annie Ilonzeh), whom Dominic targets after she steals a large amount of money from a legalized marijuana dispensary. Her actions result in the Parral Cartel killing two of Dominic's men guarding a money laundering operation. Dominic tracks down and interrogates her boyfriend Trey. Reese reaches out to Dominic and offers to return the money stolen by Harper in exchange for Trey and the hit being called off on Harper, but he refuses. After suggesting the plan to Reese and Finch, Harper decides to visit the Estonian mafia, mentions Dominic's money laundering operation, and lures them to Dominic's location while Reese rescues Trey. Fusco and the NYPD arrive and arrest the Parral Cartel, initially on possessing weapons illegally. Dominic and his crew are quickly released when he produces legal documents that show their guns are registered to his private security company. Dominic attempts to recruit Harper, who refuses, but he leaves the door open if she changes her mind. Root tries to sell an application she developed at The Machine's request to former POI Caleb Phipps, which she hopes will aid in trying to defeat Samaritan.
85	17	"Karma"	Chris Fisher	Hillary Benefiel & Sabir Pirzada	March 10, 2015	3J5417	8.67
The Machine's next number is a psychologist named Dr. Shane Edwards (Patrick Kennedy), whose wife was murdered eight years earlier, an event which continues to haunt him. The team determines that Edwards has been studying the people who traumatized his clients and got away with it, then carefully crafting frame-ups in order to punish them for their crimes. When Wyatt Morris (Daniel Sauli), the man convicted of murdering Edwards' wife is released from prison, Edwards stages his most elaborate frame: to commit suicide and make it appear that Morris murdered him. In flashbacks to 2010, Harold is shown plotting revenge on Alicia Corwin, whom he believes is responsible for killing his collaborator, Nathan Ingram. As he is about to kill Corwin with a car bomb, he has an epiphany thanks to the intervention of The Machine. He uses that experience to persuade Edwards not to go through with his plan. Additionally, the team uncovers evidence that suggests Morris probably did not commit the crime. Harold and Reese discuss the fact that they may never know the full truth. In a session with his own therapist (Iris), Reese begins to open up about Jessica, the love of his life.
86	18	"Skip"	Helen Shaver	Ashley Gable	March 24, 2015	3J5418	9.15
Reese and Fusco follow a bounty hunter named Frankie Wells (Katheryn Winnick) whose number has come up. She is trying to track down the man (Ato Essandoh) that killed her brother. Harper Rose ("Blunt") interjects herself into the cat-and-mouse case and manages to negotiate a resolution to a gunfight standoff between Reese and several other parties. Later, Harper tells Reese that Thornhill (The Machine) has been sending her texts. Finch resumes meeting with Elizabeth Bridges, whose number also came up. She is nearly ready to turn over a software package that contains the Trojan Horse which Finch had installed previously. He intends to activate it via a special device. Root, fearing that this will result in Finch being exposed and killed by Samaritan agents, foils the plan, at the cost of Finch and Elizabeth's growing mutual attraction. A doubly devastated Finch tells her to leave the team for a while. Iris confesses to Reese that she has fallen for him.
87	19	"Search and Destroy"	Stephen Surjik	Zak Schwartz	April 7, 2015	3J5419	8.67
The Machine's next number is a brilliant developer and CEO named Sulaiman Khan (Aasif Mandvi), whose antivirus software is hijacked and he is framed for embezzlement. Samaritan and its operatives spend the episode trying to find and kill Khan, while the team tries to save him and determine what Samaritan is doing. They arrive at one of Decima's underground lairs in a forest, and discover that Samaritan is using Khan's antivirus software; Martine and her men arrive, resulting in Khan being captured and meeting Greer. He asks to "look Samaritan in its eyes", to which Greer responds by shooting him dead. Finch tells Reese that since The Machine's code cannot be searched for, Samaritan is employing Khan's software to attempt to locate The Machine.
88	20	"Terra Incognita"	Alrick Riley	Erik Mountain & Melissa Scrivner Love	April 14, 2015	3J5420	9.21
The new number is a man named Chase Patterson (Zachary Booth). Finch, Root and Fusco are then to work on a case between the two gangs of Elias and Dominic while Reese works on Chase's case regarding the death of Chase's whole family. When Reese asks about the file regarding Chase Patterson, he finds out it was a case of Carter's (Taraji P. Henson). As Reese dives into the case, different flashbacks are shown with Carter doing similar investigation to what Reese is doing. As Reese reaches the final destination to the case, he discovers that Chase did not kill his parents and sisters. It was Gil, the doorman at their building, as well as Chase's half-brother. Gil then shoots Reese but Reese manages to shoot him back, killing him. In the process, Reese is trying to escape, the slow process of death is shown with Carter. Reese, now hallucinating and succumbing to hypothermia, talks to Carter about things that he wished he could have talked to her when she was alive. After Reese finishes talking with Carter, she disappears from his hallucination, and a car pulls up.
89	21	"Asylum"	Frederick E.O. Toye	Andy Callahan & Denise Thé	April 28, 2015	3J5421	8.45
Reese and Fusco race to find the next number, Carl Elias. They reach his hideout in a bank in Manhattan, but The Brotherhood arrive and capture them all. It turns out that Harper now works for Dominic. The Brotherhood tortures Elias for his intel, and Reese and Fusco for information on Harold. Elias tricks Dominic to kill his right-hand man, Link, to avenge the death of Anthony. In Washington, D.C., Control is interrogating a female Samaritan handler posing as a teacher, for a Samaritan's strategy called "The correction". Root receives a call from Shaw for help. Surprised, she and Finch follow The Machine's instructions to try to find Shaw, driving to a mental hospital, which is also Samaritan's base. Samaritan's operatives capture Finch and Root and give a choice to The Machine: to reveal its location, or both Root and Finch dies. Root kills Martine by breaking her neck. The Machine exchanges its location for Finch and Root's life. Greer takes a group to go in search for The Machine's location. Root tells Finch to reach that location before Samaritan in order to save The Machine. Shaw is last seen being driven away in a van.
90	22	"YHWH"	Chris Fisher	Dan Dietz & Greg Plageman	May 5, 2015	3J5422	8.18
Samaritan begins a series of power outages throughout the country. Having been sent by the Machine, Harper releases Fusco, but is caught by Dominic. The Machine allows Root and Reese access to its God Mode (from "Zero Day" and "God Mode"). Fusco and the NYPD arrest Dominic and Elias. Control believes "the Correction" is Greer's plan for a terrorist attack on the Supreme Court, but it's actually a list, created by Samaritan, of people who need to be eliminated for the betterment of society, including Control. Dominic and Agent Grice are killed by Samaritan snipers. Elias is also shot. Root and Finch infiltrate Caleb Phipps' (from "2πR" and "Blunt") company to steal his compression algorithm and some high-capacity RAM chips, but Caleb willingly gives them to Finch. Reese regroups with Finch and Root at an electrical substation. They discover that the Machine spread itself over the power grid in boxes attached to electrical poles, and that Samaritan has been causing the power surges to destroy the boxes. Finch and Root starts downloading The Machine's core code to a briefcase contained with the compression algorithm and RAM chips. The team walk out with the briefcase to face more Samaritan operatives.

== Production ==
=== Development ===
The series was renewed for a fourth season in March 2014. Executive producer and showrunner Greg Plageman previewed the season, "there are actually two wars going on: there's rise of the Brotherhood, led by Dominic, that's the municipal war. And then there's the larger war between the Machine and Samaritan"

=== Writing ===
Amy Acker commented on her character's feelings for Shaw, "Well... There's definitely a lot of flirtation with Shaw. They're not shying away from that, so that seems to suggest that she definitely likes her. It seems like she's not tied to one gender or the other, but I think her No. 1 crush is definitely Shaw." Sarah Shahi also commented on the same topic, "I think Shaw is starting to agree with that. But because Shaw's country presumed her dead and she kind of had to escape her own 'death', I never pictured it as, 'OK, she's part of a team' but 'She needs extra eyes, ears and hands working to help keep her safe.' She's a lone wolf. Does she have some attachments after all this time? I think the dog, Bear, has become an attachment for her. With Root, even though I agree with Amy and I think that Shaw probably does feel the same, is that anything that would ever keep her there? I don't think so. Even that is something Shaw can walk away from at any time."

Kevin Chapman also commented on his character now sharing his job with Reese, "I think that Reese is something that Fusco needs in his life at this point. Of course he's putting a real cramp in Fusco's style — here's a guy that for three seasons has kind of tortured Fusco from the shadows and now all of a sudden he's sitting across the desk from him. It's really funny to see how the relationship is going to evolve because, as you know, Reese is not a guy always plays by the rules, so how is he going to handle working a very real job with a very real detective while needing to play by these rules?" Enrico Colantoni explained more about Elias and his new role in the season, "We really spent a lot of time on Elias, which is always fun. And the more time I get to spend with Michael Emerson and Jim Caviezel, I'm a happy guy. Elias is such a cool character to play – he's sardonic, he's ironic, he's vicious, he's so unlike other villains on TV. Spending all those days on a real, larger arc hasn’t happened since he was 'Charlie Burton' in the first season. We find out so much more about him and Scarface and their lives. It's rare that TV shows take the time to develop characters like that."

The eleventh episode of the season, "If-Then-Else", saw a significant shift in the series' course. The majority of the episode consisted of simulations, by the Machine, of various scenarios resulting in different outcomes, which allowed the series to explore humor and outlandish elements that wouldn't be typically included in the series. The episode also featured the supposed death of Sameen Shaw, a decision which Greg Plageman said was due to the actress' pregnancy. Shahi reinstated that it wasn't a permanent exit, claiming that the point of the episodes were to give more priority to the team in their fight against Samaritan. Following the episode's airing, Shahi's name was removed from the opening credits. "M.I.A." would later confirm that Shaw was still alive.

For the final episode, "YHWH", Jonathan Nolan teased the episode by saying, "It's going to be a very bumpy ride. It's going to go badly for our guys, and it's going to be a giant mess, which is how we usually like to construct the end of every season." He also warned that it would have a cliffhanger, saying "I don't think it would be the end of the season for us without having some kind of big-ass twist or surprise. That's kind of our hallmark thing, and we aim to please this year, as with every year." The episode featured the shooting of Dominic Besson and Carl Elias, with the latter playing a very important role on the series since the first season. Plageman said about writing their deaths, "It's just terrible — I can't stand it. Because they've been on the show for such extended periods of time, they start to believe that they can cheat death, and when the reaper finally comes — they give you a hug, but they always wonder, 'Well, am I going to come back in flashback?'" The episode's use of "Welcome to the Machine" by Pink Floyd was planned by the producers for a long time but deemed that the episode felt the right place to add the song.

=== Casting ===
All lead actors returned to the season, with the exception of Taraji P. Henson as her character was killed off. In April 2015, Henson was announced to return for a guest appearance on "Terra Incognita" through the use of flashbacks. The episode revealed that her appearance wasn't the result of flashbacks, but hallucinations, with Greg Plageman saying that they deemed the episode "a truly psychological episode." The producers wanted Henson to return at some point and they managed to get her for a guest appearance, although due to her commitment to Empire and film career, her appearance had to be done until the 20th episode.

In July 2014, Cara Buono joined the series in a recurring role as Martine Rousseau, "a femme fatale who's uniquely qualified to navigate the new world order of Season 4 of the procedural drama." Plageman said of her character, "she's extremely capable, she's versatile and, like Root in many ways, a chameleon." In August 2014, Monique Gabriela Curnen joined the series in a recurring role as Captain Felicia Moreno, "Fusco’s latest (and hopefully not corrupt!) boss at the 8th precinct." Despite being deemed a recurring role, she only appears in "Wingman". Winston Duke also joined the series as Dominic Besson, one of the main antagonists of the season.

In August 2014, it was announced that Jason Ritter would guest star as Simon Lee, "a whip-smart, political Wunderkind with an incredible gift of foresight." In November 2014, Blair Brown joined in a guest role as Emma Blake, "an elegant and warm former public school teacher." In February 2015, Aasif Mandvi was reported to guest star as Sulaiman Khan, "a bright but demanding tech tycoon." In the same month, Katheryn Winnick was announced to guest star as Frankie Wells, "a resourceful, relentless bounty hunter who enjoys her job of chasing down bad guys perhaps a bit too much."

== Release ==
=== Broadcast ===
In May 2014, CBS announced that the series would keep its time slot, airing Tuesdays at 10 p.m., airing after NCIS and NCIS: New Orleans. In June 2014, CBS reported that the third season would premiere on September 23, 2014. The season ended on May 5, 2015.

=== Marketing ===
On July 26, 2014, the cast and crew attended the 2014 San Diego Comic-Con to discuss and promote the season and revealing a trailer for the season. On October 12, 2014, the cast attended the 2014 New York Comic Con to promote the series and showing a preview of "Prophets".

Similar to the previous season, the midpoint of the season was advertised as part of a trilogy, consisting of "The Cold War", "If-Then-Else", and "Control-Alt-Delete". Plageman previewed the episodes, especially "If-Then-Else", deeming it a "massive, cool, time-shifting episode that's going to blow some people's mind. Something totally shocking happens." Nolan talked about "Control-Alt-Delete", saying "Right when you get to a really really juicy part of the story where the audience can't wait to find out exactly what happens next, you switch gears and do something different."

=== Home media release ===
The fourth season was released on Blu-ray and DVD in region 1 on August 11, 2015, in region 2 on September 5, 2016, and in region 4 on September 2, 2015.

In 2014, Warner Bros. Television Studios announced that it sold the off-network SVOD of the series to Netflix. On December 30, 2015, the season became available to stream on Netflix. On September 22, 2020, the series left the service and was added to HBO Max on January 23, 2021.

== Reception ==
=== Viewers ===
Viewership and ratings per episode of Person of Interest season 4
No.	Title	Air date	Rating/share (18–49)	Viewers (millions)	DVR (18–49)	DVR viewers (millions)	Total (18–49)	Total viewers (millions)
1	"Panopticon"	September 23, 2014	1.7/5	10.58	1.1	4.74	2.9	15.44
2	"Nautilus"	September 30, 2014	1.8/6	10.72	1.0	4.00	2.8	14.87
3	"Wingman"	October 7, 2014	1.6/5	9.64	1.1	4.12	2.7	13.75
4	"Brotherhood"	October 14, 2014	1.5/5	9.72	1.0	3.88	2.5	13.60
5	"Prophets"	October 21, 2014	1.5/5	9.40	0.9	3.88	2.4	13.27
6	"Pretenders"	October 28, 2014	1.7/5	9.72	0.8	3.63	2.5	13.35
7	"Honor Among Thieves"	November 11, 2014	1.3/4	9.11	1.0	3.97	2.3	13.07
8	"Point of Origin"	November 18, 2014	1.6/5	9.87	0.9	3.83	2.5	13.70
9	"The Devil You Know"	November 25, 2014	1.7/5	9.04	0.9	3.88	2.6	12.92
10	"The Cold War"	December 16, 2014	1.3/4	8.94	1.1	4.05	2.4	12.99
11	"If-Then-Else"	January 6, 2015	1.7/5	10.08	0.9	4.00	2.6	14.08
12	"Control-Alt-Delete"	January 13, 2015	1.7/5	10.16	0.9	3.66	2.6	13.82
13	"M.I.A."	February 3, 2015	1.4/5	9.28	0.9	3.66	2.3	12.92
14	"Guilty"	February 10, 2015	1.6/5	9.53	0.8	3.84	2.4	13.37
15	"Q&A"	February 17, 2015	1.6/5	9.17	0.8	3.55	2.4	12.72
16	"Blunt"	February 24, 2015	1.7/5	9.63	0.9	3.67	2.6	13.30
17	"Karma"	March 10, 2015	1.5/5	8.67	0.9	3.45	2.4	12.12
18	"Skip"	March 24, 2015	1.5/5	9.15	0.8	3.43	2.3	12.58
19	"Search and Destroy"	April 7, 2015	1.3/4	8.67	0.9	3.34	2.1	11.99
20	"Terra Incognita"	April 14, 2015	1.5/5	9.21	0.7	2.92	2.2	12.13
21	"Asylum"	April 28, 2015	1.4/4	8.45	0.7	2.77	2.1	11.22
22	"YHWH"	May 5, 2015	1.1/4	8.18	0.7	2.93	1.8	11.10

=== Critical reception ===
The fourth season received highly positive reviews, with critics praising the thematic value of the Samaritan storyline. On Rotten Tomatoes, the season has an approval rating of 100% and average rating of 8.3 out of 10 based on 12 reviews. The site's critical consensus is, "Thought-provoking, grounded sci-fi makes season four of Person of Interest as compelling as it is timely."

Mike Hale of The New York Times wrote, "The Season 4 premiere... is a decent demonstration of the show's charms: some action, some humor, some dystopian high-tech intrigue and an ensemble of actors who seem to be having fun and whose characters actually seem to care for one another." Emily St. James of Vox wrote positively about the season, deeming the series as "the second coming of The X-Files", writing, "Over its four seasons, Person of Interest has slowly but surely built a mythology around its central Machine. The series blows up its central conceit as often as it possibly can, to reveal newer, bigger depths in its mythology. In that respect, it's a much more disciplined show than The X-Files, which only returned to its ongoing alien colonization storyline for a handful of episodes each season and very quickly ran out of anywhere to go with it. But Person of Interest has a couple of decades of TV serialization post-X-Files to draw upon, time that has been spent in figuring out how best to unspool these stories so they can keep going and going and going." After the season ended, Matt Fowler of IGN gave the season an "amazing" 9.3 out of 10 rating and wrote in his verdict, "Person of Interest delivered another twisting, tragic season of sinister surveillance while keeping the debate about privacy and security alive and meaningful. It's a stupendous, action-packed series that deserves a larger share of the online conversation."

The episode "If-Then-Else" garnered near-unanimous praise from critics and audiences alike, with many considering the episode to be the best entry in the series. Fowler gave the episode a perfect rating of 10 out 10, indicating it to a "masterpiece", and praised the simulation format, the action scenes, the emotional value, and the ending. He called the episode "next-level inventive" and a "jolting, exciting, heart-wrenching episode". Fowler said the ending scene "crushed" him, and he also offered praise to the significance of the flashbacks to the chess games. Alexa Planje of The A.V. Club gave the episode an A rating, and in her review, said that though the task of executing a story structured like "If-Then-Else" was difficult, the episode did so "elegantly" – she cited the "interesting score, vibrant color work, and humor" as the key elements. Planje said the episode "aces every scenario" during the simulation segments, and appreciated how the episode transformed itself from what appeared to be a "standard mission-focused story" into a "moving ode" to Shaw. She also praised the episode's exploration of the parallels between being a human and being a machine. Shant Istamboulian of Entertainment Weekly lauded Emerson's performance in the flashbacks and felt the season marked the series' "creative peak". He concluded by saying "Moving like a rocket, this episode is fast, funny, exciting, and, ultimately, sad, ending with what seems like the loss of another team member. We'll have to wait until next week for the outcome, but as it stands, "If-Then-Else" is an instant classic." Surette also had high praise for the episode, calling it "playful, mind-bending, heart-breaking, and flat-out excellent." He praised the episode's incorporation of its "recurring theme of sacrifice", and called the flashbacks "as fascinating and provocative as anything the series has done." Surette cited his favorite part of the episode as the exploration of the Machine's perspective, and additionally praised the humorous segments.
