= Panopticon (Person of Interest) =

- Person of Interest episode
- Episode no.: Season 4 Episode 1
- Directed by: Richard J. Lewis
- Written by: Erik Mountain & Greg Plageman
- Cinematography by: David Insley
- Editing by: Mark Conte
- Production code: 3J5401
- Original air date: September 23, 2014
- Running time: 43 minutes

Guest appearances
- Enrico Colantoni as Carl Elias; John Doman as Senator Ross Garrison; Cara Buono as Martine Rousseau; John Nolan as John Greer; Jamie Hector as Lincoln "Link" Cordell; Frederick Weller as Novak; David Valcin as Scarface; Andrew Polk as University Department Chair; Michael Burg as Department Store Floor Manager; Navid Negahban as Ali Hasan

Episode chronology
← Previous "Deus Ex Machina"	Next → "Nautilus"

"Panopticon" is the 1st episode and season premiere of the fourth season of the American television drama series Person of Interest. It is the 69th overall episode of the series and is written by producer Erik Mountain and executive producer Greg Plageman and directed by Richard J. Lewis. It aired on CBS in the United States and on CTV in Canada on September 23, 2014.

The series revolves around a computer program for the federal government known as "The Machine" that is capable of collating all sources of information to predict terrorist acts and to identify people planning them. A team, consisting of John Reese, Harold Finch and Sameen Shaw follow "irrelevant" crimes: lesser level of priority for the government. However, their security and safety is put in danger following the activation of a new program named Samaritan. In the episode, with Samaritan's activation, the team has gone their separate ways to avoid being detected. However, Reese is forced to save a new number that could impact their covers. The title refers to "Panopticon", a type of institutional building and a system of control which allows all prisoners of an institution to be observed by a single security guard, without the inmates being able to tell whether they are being watched.

According to Nielsen Media Research, the episode was seen by an estimated 10.58 million household viewers and gained a 1.7/5 ratings share among adults aged 18–49. The episode received positive reviews, although some noted the pace and tone in comparison to the previous season, others welcomed the new angle on the characters and storylines.

== Plot ==
In Budapest, a woman named Martine Rousseau (Cara Buono) kills a journalist that may have known about the Samaritan program. Samaritan has successfully prevented many threats for the United States. However, Senator Garrison (John Doman) expresses his concerns to Greer (John Nolan) as Decima Technologies has been defunct and is unsure of where the information is held. This worries Greer, who considers eliminating him but Samaritan tells him not do it yet.

The team has been living new lives since Samaritan's activation. Shaw (Sarah Shahi) now works at the cosmetics counter of a department store, Reese (Jim Caviezel) works as a NYPD Narcotics Detective, and Finch (Michael Emerson) works as a part-time college professor. After a talk with Root (Amy Acker), Shaw goes to a self-esteem seminar where she runs into Reese, who was given the same address at the exact time. They leave the seminar but a payphone rings. Reese answers and is given a new number.

Reese meets with Finch in a park and reveals the number belongs to Ali Hasan (Navid Negahban). Finch refuses to cooperate with the Machine after its order to kill McCourt and tells Reese to avoid the numbers as Samaritan will find them. Reese still decides to follow Hasan, who owns an electronics shop. He sees that Hasan is connected to a gang named "The Brotherhood", who asked Hasan to set up a network between them. After meeting with a representative of the Brotherhood named Lincoln "Link" Cordell (Jamie Hector) and giving him a burner phone, Hasan is revealed to have sent a bomb detonation code to Link's cellphone. Reese hijacks Link's car and takes out his cellphone before it explodes.

Reese and Fusco (Kevin Chapman) question Hasan when he realizes that his plan failed. They return to the shop to find it trashed and his son Ben missing. The Brotherhood contacts Hasan and tells him to get the network set up by midnight or they will kill Ben. Reese confronts some of The Brotherhood's dealers but is knocked out by Shaw, who tells him that they can't get involved in this. Reese then decides to visit Elias (Enrico Colantoni) for help in intercepting a shipment of heroin from The Brotherhood.

Finch decides to help Hasan in setting up the network and finds that Hasan has developed a covert communications network using old VHF television antennas laced throughout the five boroughs of New York, making it invisible to Samaritan. He then gives Reese one of the phones that uses Hasan's network. Elias' henchman, Scarface (David Valcin) rams one of The Brotherhood's SUVs. Reese enters the house where the heroin and Ben are held while Shaw eliminates many of The Brotherhood from a different house. Link tries to escape with Ben but Reese subdues him just as the police arrives but Reese covers everything as part of an operation. Rousseau arrives at the scene posing as a DHS agent and does not believe in the reported story of the police.

Finch meets with Reese and gives him Hasan's network so they can avoid Samaritan. For his actions, Reese is promoted to Homicide and partnered with Fusco, being assigned to Carter's old desk. Shaw decides to accept a date with someone who constantly sent her notifications on an app. At a café, she finds that the man, Romeo, wants her to work with him on a gang operation, which she accepts. Finch reviews his corrected thesis and finds that the letters marked are from a code. The codes lead him to a library for a specific book and finally arriving at an underground hideout, using a forgotten Interborough Rapid Transit Company station.

== Reception ==
=== Viewers ===
In its original American broadcast, "Panopticon" was seen by an estimated 10.58 million household viewers and gained a 1.7/5 ratings share among adults aged 18–49, according to Nielsen Media Research. This means that 1.7 percent of all households with televisions watched the episode, while 5 percent of all households watching television at that time watched it. This was a 4% decrease in viewership from the previous episode, which was watched by 10.95 million viewers with a 1.9/6 in the 18-49 demographics. It was also a 15% decrease in viewership from the previous season premiere, which was watched by 12.44 million viewers with a 2.3/6 in the 18-49 demographics. With these ratings, Person of Interest was the third most watched show on CBS for the night, behind NCIS: New Orleans and NCIS, third on its timeslot and seventh for the night in the 18-49 demographics, behind Forever, Agents of S.H.I.E.L.D., NCIS: New Orleans, Chicago Fire, NCIS, and The Voice.

With Live +7 DVR factored in, the episode was watched by 15.44 million viewers with a 2.9 in the 18-49 demographics.

=== Critical reviews ===
"Panopticon" received positive reviews from critics. Matt Fowler of IGN gave the episode a "great" 8.3 out of 10 rating and wrote in his verdict, "'Panopticon' lifted our heroes up out of their 'secret identity' ashes in order to get them to a place where they could secretly save lives again. With odes to both Batman and Lost, the premiere provided plenty of action, humor, and intrigue while turning Reese into the mission's default cheerleader. There's still a 'comedown' effect in place given the way last season wrapped up, and it might take a while for the danger to grow again, but it's off to a good start. Again, our vigilantes aren't in any position to take on Samaritan, just save 'numbers.'"

Alexa Planje of The A.V. Club gave the episode a "B+" grade and wrote, "An ambitious season finale is a tough act to follow, and 'Panopticon' seems safer and more tepid in comparison. While Person of Interest should never try to be something it isn't, it could use a little of the audacity demonstrated by the season premiere of Sleepy Hollow, a young and hungry show at this stage in the game."

Sean McKenna of TV Fanatic gave the episode a 4.4 star rating out of 5 and wrote "Person of Interest is moving itself right along on its new chapter, providing a thrilling, action packed premiere that reiterates why the series is 'can't miss TV'. Glad to see the show still has plenty of charm, intrigue, drama and is just plain fun to watch."
