= The Devil You Know (Person of Interest) =

- Person of Interest episode
- Episode no.: Season 4 Episode 9
- Directed by: Richard J. Lewis
- Written by: Erik Mountain
- Cinematography by: Gonzalo Amat
- Editing by: Scott Powell
- Production code: 3J5409
- Original air date: November 25, 2014
- Running time: 43 minutes

Guest appearances
- David Valcin as Scarface; James LeGros as Bruce Moran; Cara Buono as Martine Rousseau; Winston Duke as Dominic Besson; John Nolan as John Greer; Jamie Hector as Lincoln "Link" Cordell; Salvatore Inzerillo as Gino; Michael J. Burg as Department Store Floor Manager; Enrico Colantoni as Carl Elias

Episode chronology
← Previous "Point of Origin"	Next → "The Cold War"

"The Devil You Know" is the ninth episode of the fourth season of the American television drama series Person of Interest. It is the 77th overall episode of the series and is written by producer Erik Mountain and directed by Richard J. Lewis. It aired on CBS in the United States and on CTV in Canada on November 25, 2014.

The series revolves around a computer program for the federal government known as "The Machine" that is capable of collating all sources of information to predict terrorist acts and to identify people planning them. A team, consisting of John Reese, Harold Finch and Sameen Shaw follow "irrelevant" crimes: lesser level of priority for the government. However, their security and safety is put in danger following the activation of a new program named Samaritan. In the episode, the team receives Elias' number and must protect him from a war with The Brotherhood. Shaw's cover is blown and she must hide to avoid being detected by Samaritan. The title refers to the phrase "The devil you know", which is a reference to the proverb "better the devil you know than the devil you don't", describing ambiguity aversion.

According to Nielsen Media Research, the episode was seen by an estimated 9.04 million household viewers and gained a 1.7/5 ratings share among adults aged 18–49. The episode received highly positive reviews, with critics praising Enrico Colantoni's performance, action scenes and new set-up for the next episodes.

== Plot ==
Shaw (Sarah Shahi) and Rousseau (Cara Buono) start a gunfight at the department store although neither is wounded. Shaw escapes with the help of Root (Amy Acker) and taken to a moving truck. With her cover blown, Shaw is transported with Root to a safe location where Fusco (Kevin Chapman) picks them up.

Reese (Jim Caviezel) has been assigned to protect Elias (Enrico Colantoni) after realizing he is the next number and noticing members of The Brotherhood are following him. Reese reveals his mission to Elias but he remains calm at the situation. After a failed assassination attempt, Reese takes Elias and Scarface (David Valcin) to another location. Elias seeks shelter with Gino (Salvatore Inzerillo) but they realize Gino is in association with The Brotherhood and it is very likely that The Brotherhood convinced other allies of Elias to betray him. They decide to search for Elias' accountant, Bruce Moran (James LeGros), who may be his only trustworthy ally.

Rousseau then finds leads on who picked up Shaw from the truck and poses as a DEA agent to question Fusco. Fusco, with help from Finch (Michael Emerson) overhearing, do not fall for. Finch informs Shaw about Reese's situation and she decides to stop hiding and go help. Root, despite protesting, agrees to help her in getting to his location. However, Root leads her to a fake location and injects her with a sedative in order to protect her.

Reese, Elias and Scarface arrive at an empty building owned by Elias to retrieve money from his vault. However, The Brotherhood arrives and take Scarface after wounding him while Reese and Elias hide in a secret room. Dominic (Winston Duke) and his men try to open the vault while also torturing Scarface to reveal the numbers. Reese and Elias escape but Elias locks Reese out of the building, intending to exchange himself for Scarface. They talk over the phone and Elias gives the numbers to open the vault. However, the numbers are actually for a bomb detonator in the vault, which ends with Scarface and many members of The Brotherhood dead. Reese breaks in again and rescues Elias, but Dominic escapes.

Root has taken Shaw to the train station, intending to keep her safe. Greer (John Nolan) assigns a group of hitmen to aid Rousseau in her quest to find Shaw. Dominic and a wounded Link (Jamie Hector) discuss Elias and the people who are protecting him, intending to find who is their financer. Elias meets with Moran to notify him of his office and allies. He then calls Reese to say he will take action against The Brotherhood for Scarface's death, and warns the team to stay out of the way once that day comes.

== Reception ==
=== Viewers ===
In its original American broadcast, "The Devil You Know" was seen by an estimated 9.04 million household viewers and gained a 1.7/5 ratings share among adults aged 18–49, according to Nielsen Media Research. This means that 1.7 percent of all households with televisions watched the episode, while 5 percent of all households watching television at that time watched it. This was a 9% decrease in viewership from the previous episode, which was watched by 9.87 million viewers with a 1.6/5 in the 18-49 demographics. With these ratings, Person of Interest was the third most watched show on CBS for the night, behind NCIS: New Orleans and NCIS, second on its timeslot and sixth for the night in the 18-49 demographics, behind a Dancing with the Stars clip show, The Voice, NCIS: New Orleans, NCIS, and Dancing with the Stars.

With Live +7 DVR factored in, the episode was watched by 12.92 million viewers with a 2.6 in the 18-49 demographics.

=== Critical reviews ===
"The Devil You Know" received highly positive reviews from critics. Matt Fowler of IGN gave the episode a "great" 8.7 out of 10 rating and wrote in his verdict, "'The Devil You Know' may have not been the huge episode I was predicting it to be, but it still provided a hefty load of violence and intrigue - choosing to set up a formal war between Elias and Dominic rather than just have the new upstart steamroll the old guard. It kept Elias' character, and genius, intact while setting up a ton of future complications for our heroes."

Alexa Planje of The A.V. Club gave the episode an "A−" grade and wrote, "'The Devil You Know' is an episode that has a lot going for it. The hour focuses on one of the series' best arcs, the escalation of the war between Elias and Dominic. The episode also leans on some of Person of Interest's most reliable, signature moves."
