= Control-Alt-Delete (Person of Interest) =

- Person of Interest episode
- Episode no.: Season 4 Episode 12
- Directed by: Stephen Surjik
- Written by: Andy Callahan
- Cinematography by: David Insley
- Editing by: Ryan Malanaphy
- Production code: 3J5412
- Original air date: January 13, 2015
- Running time: 43 minutes

Guest appearances
- John Doman as Senator Ross Garrison; Michael Gaston as Mike Richelli; Michael Potts as Travers; John Nolan as John Greer; Nick E. Tarabay as Devon Grice; Oakes Fegley as Gabriel Hayward; Ryan Shams as Yasin Said; Theodora Woolley as Brooks; Suzy Jane Hunt as Shiffman; William Jackson Harper as Strobel; Camryn Manheim as Control

Episode chronology
← Previous "If-Then-Else"	Next → "M.I.A."

"Control-Alt-Delete" is the 12th episode of the fourth season of the American television drama series Person of Interest. It is the 80th overall episode of the series and is written by Andy Callahan and directed by Stephen Surjik. It aired on CBS in the United States and on CTV in Canada on January 13, 2015.

The series revolves around a computer program for the federal government known as "The Machine" that is capable of collating all sources of information to predict terrorist acts and to identify people planning them. A team follows "irrelevant" crimes: lesser level of priority for the government. However, their security and safety is put in danger following the activation of a new program named Samaritan. In the episode, Control starts working on a new terrorist threat in Washington, D.C., but her discovery makes her question her loyalty when she realizes Samaritan may keep secrets from her. The title refers to "Control-Alt-Delete", computer keyboard command which generally interrupts or facilitates interrupting a function.

According to Nielsen Media Research, the episode was seen by an estimated 10.16 million household viewers and gained a 1.7 out of 5 ratings share among adults aged 18–49. The episode received highly positive reviews, with critics praising the writing, performances and momentum from the previous episodes.

== Plot ==
In Washington, D.C., Control (Camryn Manheim) is ordered to go to the White House. In the Operations Room, she is briefed that they discovered four terrorists on Detroit and watch as a group of operatives, including Devon Grice (Nick E. Tarabay) eliminate the terrorists. However, the fourth terrorist, Yasin Said, escaped and when Control demands access to his hard drive, Samaritan denies access. Samaritan has also sent Gabriel (Oakes Fegley) to talk with the Chief of Staff Mike Richelli (Michael Gaston) and warn him about an incoming financial crash.

Senator Garrison (John Doman) orders Greer (John Nolan) to let them access the hard drive but Greer refuses, threatening to cut contact with Samaritan. Control then sends Grice and Brooks to find Said's laptop, threatening Grice with her knowledge of surveillance seeing him letting Shaw and Tomas go during their mission. Grice and Brooks intercept Said with the laptop but just as Grice contacts Control about the content, the laptop overheats and bursts into flames. Said escapes and Samaritan sends a message to Control to stop investigating.

Control sends them again to pursue Said but realizes that Samaritan, through its spokesperson Travers (Michael Potts), has already reassigned them to another mission to stop the investigation. Control is forced to ambush Said herself by pursuing him on car while he boards a train. However, her car is ambushed by another car, who crashes it using a Rocket-propelled grenade. The assailants are revealed to be Reese (Jim Caviezel) and Root (Amy Acker), who demand to know Shaw's location.

They take her to a hideout where Root starts torturing her to get information until Finch (Michael Emerson) stops her. They tell her about the events on the New York Stock Exchange, which she seemed to be unaware of. ISA operatives arrive to save her and Reese and Grice fight until they realize their connections to Shaw and both let each other go. Finch and Fusco (Kevin Chapman) then enter into a van to plant a worm on Samaritan's private network which will alert them of anything related to Shaw before the team escapes. Using the worm, they have a lead on a possible location and Reese and Root head there to see if they'll find a clue about Shaw.

Control tracks Said down outside Toronto and confronts him at his cabin. Said reveals that he participated in the Nautilus game and his friends were hired to program for an unknown benefactor and has no idea of the content on the hard drive. Nevertheless, Control kills him. Richelli is once again visited by Samaritan through Gabriel, who shows its power at predictions and demands meeting with the President. Control visits the Stock Exchange and finds evidence of cleaning up the scene, making her believe more in Finch's statements.

== Reception ==
=== Viewers ===
In its original American broadcast, "Control-Alt-Delete" was seen by an estimated 10.16 million household viewers and gained a 1.7 out of 5 ratings share among adults aged 18–49, according to Nielsen Media Research. This means that 1.7 percent of all households with televisions watched the episode, while 5 percent of all households watching television at that time watched it. This was a slight increase in viewership from the previous episode, which was watched by 10.08 million viewers with a 1.7 out of 5 in the 18-49 demographics. With these ratings, Person of Interest was the third most watched show on CBS for the night, behind NCIS: New Orleans and NCIS, first on its timeslot and fourth for the night in the 18-49 demographics, behind Shark Tank, NCIS: New Orleans, and NCIS.

With Live +7 DVR factored in, the episode was watched by 13.82 million viewers with a 2.6 in the 18-49 demographics.

=== Critical reviews ===
"Control-Alt-Delete" received highly positive reviews from critics. Matt Fowler of IGN gave the episode an "amazing" 9.2 out of 10 rating and wrote in his verdict, "'Control-Alt-Delete' was an incredible episode, packed with sharp turns and surprises. Knowing it was best not to tread over 2013's trilogy closer, POI went a completely different route. And it worked. Plus, we got an awesome use of Moby's 'The Violent Bear It Away' during the closing montage."

Alexa Planje of The A.V. Club gave the episode a "B+" grade and wrote, "Given that this trilogy has been concerned with the rise of Samaritan and the loss of Shaw, it's somewhat surprising to see its conclusion shift focus to Control. At the same time, the choice to delve further into Control's headspace makes some sense at this juncture, since there's no Samaritan or Shaw as we know them without her."
