= Pretenders (Person of Interest) =

- Person of Interest episode
- Episode no.: Season 4 Episode 6
- Directed by: Stephen Surjik
- Written by: Ashley Gable
- Cinematography by: Gonzalo Amat
- Editing by: Scott Powell
- Production code: 3J5406
- Original air date: October 28, 2014
- Running time: 43 minutes

Guest appearances
- Enrico Colantoni as Carl Elias; Jessica Hecht as Beth Bridges; Erik Jensen as Walter Dang; John Nolan as John Greer; David Valcin as Scarface; Winston Duke as Dominic Besson; Michaela Walters as Elena Mindler; Ohene Cornelius as Armorer

Episode chronology
| ← Previous "Prophets" | Next → "Honor Among Thieves" |

"Pretenders" is the 6th episode of the fourth season of the American television drama series Person of Interest. It is the 74th overall episode of the series and is written by co-executive producer Ashley Gable and directed by Stephen Surjik. It aired on CBS in the United States and on CTV in Canada on October 28, 2014.

The series revolves around a computer program for the federal government known as "The Machine" that is capable of collating all sources of information to predict terrorist acts and to identify people planning them. A team, consisting of John Reese, Harold Finch and Sameen Shaw follow "irrelevant" crimes: lesser level of priority for the government. However, their security and safety is put in danger following the activation of a new program named Samaritan. In the episode, the team follows a worker at an insurance company who tries to investigate the suicide of a worker's brother, indicating the person didn't commit suicide. Meanwhile, Finch is at Hong Kong for a conference and runs into a small tech company owner. Despite being credited, Amy Acker does not appear in the episode.

According to Nielsen Media Research, the episode was seen by an estimated 9.72 million household viewers and gained a 1.7/5 ratings share among adults aged 18–49. The episode received positive reviews, with critics praising the action scenes and plot development although the pace and main storyline received more criticism.

== Plot ==
After saving a number, Reese (Jim Caviezel) is assigned a new one: Walter Dang (Erik Jensen), a worker at an insurance company. Shaw (Sarah Shahi) is already infiltrated at the company as a new temporary employee. Shaw overhears a conversation of Dang saying he is investigating the death of Abel Mindler, who apparently committed suicide.

Due to academic pressure, Finch (Michael Emerson) must go to a conference in Kowloon, Hong Kong so he leaves Shaw in charge of his computer. There, he runs into Elizabeth Bridges (Jessica Hecht), a small tech company owner, and the two bond. They are mugged on the way to the hotel and are forced to give the thief their laptops. Reese follows Dang to the same building where Mindler committed suicide and after discovering that he has Mindler's SIM card on his burner phone, they wonder if Dang was involved in his death, which now appears to be a homicide. He then follows Dang to an airport to talk to Mindler's supervisor only to find him tied to a chair and with criminals. The criminals kill the supervisor and Mindler escapes although Reese knocks him out.

Despite knowing he is pretending to be a detective, Reese fakes falling for Dang's role in order to get more information. Despite being cooperative, Dang escapes the precinct in fear. He is later kidnapped by on his job but is saved by Reese and Shaw. Dang gets dragged into a gang war between Elias (Enrico Colantoni) and the unknown adversaries. It is later shown that Abel was smuggling high explosive weapons to the same gang.

The gang abducts Dang for the location of the truck which Abel drove and then ditched, once he realized what he was smuggling; but the team intervenes. Elias meets with Dominic (Winston Duke), and it is shown that Dominic was the mastermind behind the guns as he wanted to shift the balance of power. Back in Hong Kong, Finch and Bridges find the thief's workplace and Finch subdues him. Bridges thanks him and both part ways, promising to meet again in New York. However, it's revealed that Finch paid the thief to steal it and plant a malware on Bridges' laptop. Bridges calls a potential investor, who is revealed to be a Samaritan operative. The operative meets with Greer (John Nolan), revealing that Samaritan is acquiring more shares on many companies in the world.

== Reception ==
=== Viewers ===
In its original American broadcast, "Pretenders" was seen by an estimated 9.72 million household viewers and gained a 1.7/5 ratings share among adults aged 18–49, according to Nielsen Media Research. This means that 1.7 percent of all households with televisions watched the episode, while 5 percent of all households watching television at that time watched it. This was a 3% increase in viewership from the previous episode, which was watched by 9.40 million viewers with a 1.5/5 in the 18-49 demographics. With these ratings, Person of Interest was the third most watched show on CBS for the night, behind NCIS: New Orleans and NCIS, first on its timeslot and fifth for the night in the 18-49 demographics, behind NCIS: New Orleans, NCIS, The Voice, and the sixth game of the 2014 World Series.

With Live +7 DVR factored in, the episode was watched by 13.35 million viewers with a 2.5 in the 18-49 demographics.

=== Critical reviews ===
"Pretenders" received positive reviews from critics. Matt Fowler of IGN gave the episode a "great" 8.6 out of 10 rating and wrote in his verdict, "'Pretenders' was solid POI. And while Walter may have seemed like a hapless hindrance at times, he was still there to help remind Reese that his 'Main in the Suit' vigilante work had not only made a difference, but had also inspired others into action. And there were reciprocal benefits too since Walter got to learn that his hero hadn't vanished after all and that he could chuck his fake badge in the trash. Also, other great moments, like Shaw trying to get Bear to eat, Scarface showing up with that giant limo-piercing gun, and Finch taking out the mugger with an umbrella shot to the face, helped give this episode a boost."

Alexa Planje of The A.V. Club gave the episode a "B−" grade and wrote, "The episode moves several plots forward, but it would take a much more efficient script to deliver a case of the week and this much setup elegantly."

Sean McKenna of TV Fanatic gave the episode a 4.3 star rating out of 5 and wrote "While the case of the week did take a more front seat, Person of Interest never fails to kick it up a notch and incorporate the larger story as well. And it continues to be obvious that this series is not going to let up in providing that entertaining hour of television. This was definitely another fun episode for sure."
