= If-Then-Else =

- Person of Interest episode
- Episode no.: Season 4 Episode 11
- Directed by: Chris Fisher
- Written by: Denise Thé
- Production code: 3J5411
- Original air date: January 6, 2015

Guest appearances
- Cara Buono as Martine Rousseau; John Nolan as John Greer; Julian Ovenden as Lambert; Mark Gessner as Gary; Christopher LaPanta as Kenneth

Episode chronology
← Previous "The Cold War"	Next → "Control-Alt-Delete"

"If-Then-Else" is the eleventh episode of the fourth season of the Person of Interest television series. It originally aired on January 6, 2015, on CBS. It is the seventy-ninth overall episode for the series.

"If-Then-Else" was written by Denise Thé and directed by Chris Fisher. The episode continues the series' long-running Samaritan storyline. It centers on the Machine evaluating a list of possible strategies to allow the team to succeed in a mission to recover New York City's stock market after Samaritan attacks the stock exchange and cripples the city's financial system.

According to Nielsen Media Research, the episode was watched by 10.08 million viewers with a 1.7/5 ratings share in the 18 to 49 age demographic upon airing. The episode was highly acclaimed by critics and audiences alike, with reviewers praising the originality and execution of the premise, the thematic value, and the shocking ending, with many calling it one of the series' best episodes.

== Plot ==
Following the events of "The Cold War," Samaritan cripples New York City's financial system after attacking the stock exchange. Amidst the turmoil of the plummeting stocks, Finch (Michael Emerson), "Root" (Amy Acker), Reese (Jim Caviezel) and Fusco (Kevin Chapman) head to the New York stock exchange to revitalize it. Decima Technologies operatives ambush the team, prompting them to take cover inside an office break room. Meanwhile, Shaw (Sarah Shahi) is in a subway train spying on a man with access to the stock exchange's security codes. Matters are complicated when a suicidal man unveils a bomb vest he threatens to detonate. Root consults the Machine for help, and the Machine in turn evaluates the possible strategies to help them succeed.

The episode periodically flashes back to 2003, where Finch is in a park playing chess with the Machine and using the games as analogies to various concepts he teaches it. Several games later, as the Machine is appearing triumphant on many occasions, Finch tells it that he doesn't enjoy chess since it was created during a time of cynicism and societal imbalance. Finch believes people should not be assigned "values" and sacrificed; those who treat life as game of chess deserve to lose.

In the present day, the Machine uses its knowledge of chess as a basis to narrow down its options and run simulations. In the first, Finch and Root go to the security room, while Fusco and Reese take over elevator controls. This results in Decima forces overpowering both teams and killing Finch. The second option swaps the destinations of the two groups, which ends up with a wounded Reese detonating a grenade, killing himself and everyone in the security room, while Root professes her love to Shaw before dying. Both of these scenarios also show Shaw shooting the suicidal bomber and being immediately arrested by SWAT teams.

In the last simulation shown, the whole group non-violently takes over the security room and stabilizes the market while Shaw talks the suicidal man out of bombing the train. Left with little time, the Machine deploys this option even though it only has a 2.07% chance of the team's survival in taking over the elevator. These odds increase to 22.48% when Shaw arrives with explosives to fend off the attackers. The elevator, however, stops functioning right as they are about to escape. Shaw decides to sacrifice her safety and leave the elevator to press an override button on the other side of the hallway, passionately kissing a concerned Root to distract her before shutting the elevator door behind her. But before she can return to the elevator, Martine (Cara Buono) catches up and shoots Shaw multiple times as the elevator doors close, while Root and the team watch in horror.

== Production ==
"If-Then-Else" was written by longtime Person of Interest writer Denise Thé and directed by Chris Fisher, also a veteran crew member. This is Thé's tenth episode written for the series and Fisher's eleventh directing credit.

The episode's narrative structure is significantly different from other episodes in that the majority of the episode is made of simulations, by the Machine, of various scenarios resulting in different outcomes. The execution of this tactic was praised by several commentators due to its opportunity to include humor and more outlandish elements than what is typically allowed. Series showrunner Greg Plageman also voiced his initial skepticism over the idea until he realized the value of it, and went forth with it.

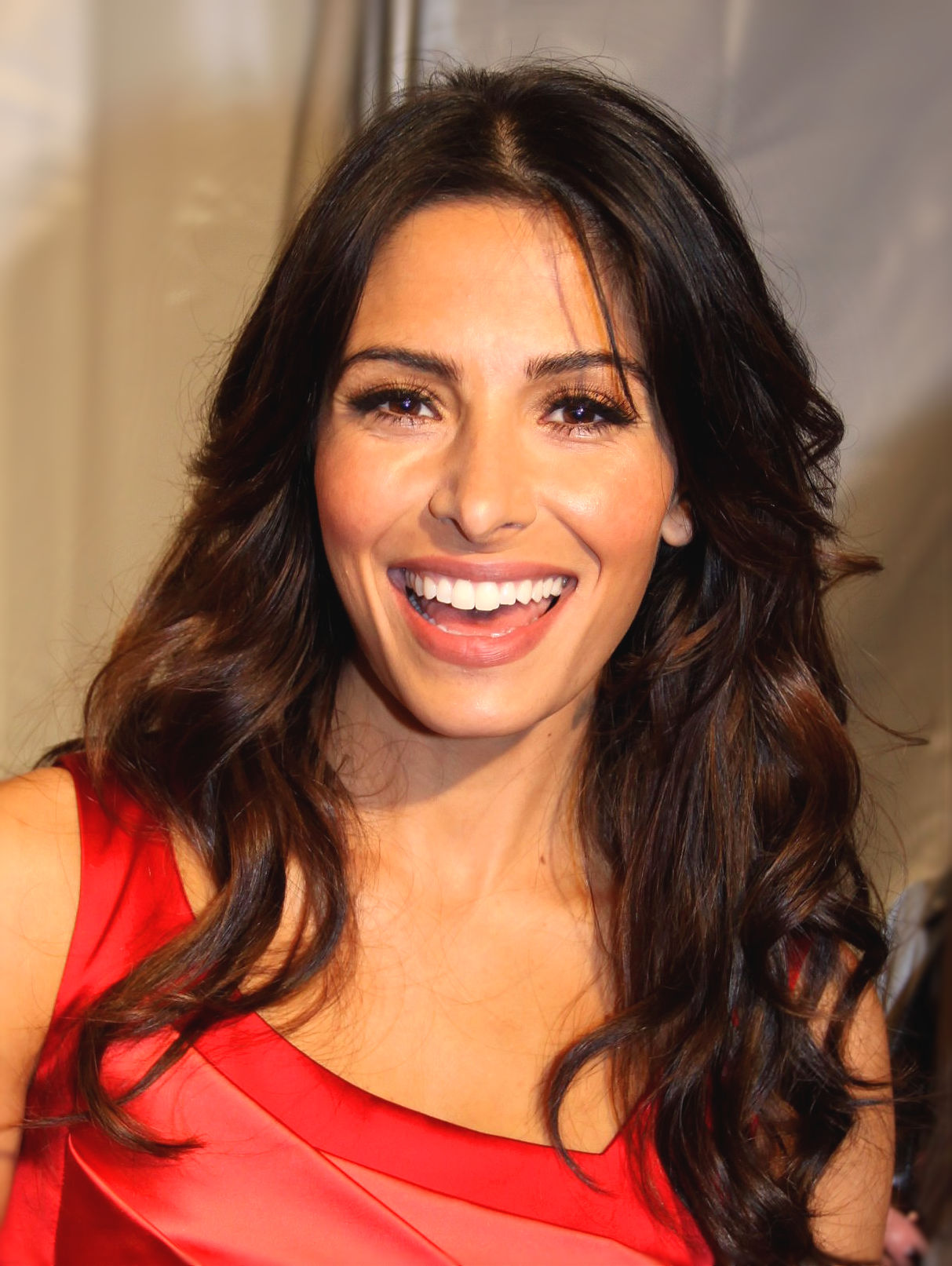
The episode marks the temporary departure of Shaw (Sarah Shahi, pictured), due to the actress's pregnancy.

The episode's most notable development is the supposed death of the character of Shaw - the event sparked rampant discussion and response from the cast and crew. Series executive producer Greg Plageman stated that the reason for Shaw's sacrifice was mainly due to actress Sarah Shahi's pregnancy with twins. In an interview with Entertainment Weekly, Shahi said about the decision, "When you become a parent, that task takes priority over everything. It would be impossible for me. At the end of the day, nothing is more important than the health and the comfort of my children... ...But I've so enjoyed this character. She’s so dynamic. I get to pretend to be a superhero every week on TV, so that’s definitely the bitter part of the ‘bittersweet.’" Plageman said that the main goal of the ending scene was to convey it "heroic" and a "self-sacrifice." Actress Amy Acker stated in an interview that she felt this episode was the "climax" of the season, and that it embodied the true "war" between the Machines, feeling that the episode finally managed to deviate from a sense of buildup that the rest of the season always seemed to bear. When asked about Root's relationship with Shaw, Acker referenced a quote hinting at a romantic development from the season's fifth episode and followed by saying, "I feel like even if it's not a romantic relationship -- even though the writers have hinted to us that it is -- that whatever it is they do care about each other. And they have each other."

However, it has been hinted that Shaw may not have been killed off entirely; Shahi stated that her leave is temporary and, pointing out that the episode is the second in a three-part episode series, said about Shaw's death: "That is what the team is going to have to figure out. Is she alive? Did Samaritan capture her? Where is she? The rule in TV is if you don’t see a body, then they’re not dead." Actor Michael Emerson also voiced various theories over Shaw's fate. Nonetheless, the cast still offered praise to Shahi and said their goodbyes to her. Later, the closing scene of episode thirteen confirmed that Shaw is alive.

The music used during the simulation segments is "Fortune Days" by American electronic music group The Glitch Mob.

The episode title is a reference to the computer programming syntax, "if-then-else".

== Reception ==
=== Ratings ===
"If-Then-Else" aired on Tuesday, January 6, 2015 and, according to Nielsen Media Research, was watched by 9.97 million viewers with a 1.7/5 ratings share in the 18 to 49 age demographic.

=== Reviews ===
"If-Then-Else" attracted near universal praise from critics, with many regarding it as one of the series' best episodes. Matt Fowler of IGN gave the episode a perfect rating of 10 out 10, indicating it is a "masterpiece" and praising the simulation format, the action scenes, the emotional value, and the ending. He called the episode "next-level inventive" and a "jolting, exciting, heart-wrenching episode." Fowler said the ending scene "crushed" him, and he also offered praise to the significance of the flashbacks to the chess games. Alexa Planje of The A.V. Club gave the episode an A rating, saying in her review that though the task of executing a story structured like "If-Then-Else" was difficult, the episode did so "elegantly," citing the "interesting score, vibrant color work, and humor" as key elements. Planje said the episode "aces every scenario" during the simulation segments, appreciating how the episode transformed itself from what appeared to be a "standard mission-focused story" into a "moving ode" to Shaw. She also praised the episode's exploration of the parallels between being a human and being a machine.
