= M.I.A. (Person of Interest) =

- Person of Interest episode
- Episode no.: Season 4 Episode 13
- Directed by: Kevin Bray
- Written by: Lucas O'Connor
- Cinematography by: Gonzalo Amat
- Editing by: Scott Powell
- Production code: 3J5413
- Original air date: February 3, 2015
- Running time: 43 minutes

Guest appearances
- Maddie Corman as Leslie Thompson; Adria Arjona as Dani Silva; Mason Pettit as Albert Weiss; John Leonard Thompson as Dr. Victor Haskell; Brian Russell as Chief Wicker

Episode chronology
← Previous "Control-Alt-Delete"	Next → "Guilty"

"M.I.A." is the 13th episode of the fourth season of the American television drama series Person of Interest. It is the 81st overall episode of the series and is written by Lucas O'Connor and directed by Kevin Bray. It aired on CBS in the United States and on CTV in Canada on February 3, 2015.

The series revolves around a computer program for the federal government known as "The Machine" that is capable of collating all sources of information to predict terrorist acts and to identify people planning them. A team follows "irrelevant" crimes: lesser level of priority for the government. However, their security and safety is put in danger following the activation of a new program named Samaritan. In the episode, Reese and Root head to a small town where Shaw may have been seen but realize that the town is part of a big experiment by Samaritan. Meanwhile, Fusco handles a new number with Officer Silva. The title refers to "Missing in action", a casualty classification assigned to combatants, military chaplains, combat medics, and prisoners of war who are reported missing during wartime or ceasefire.

According to Nielsen Media Research, the episode was seen by an estimated 9.28 million household viewers and gained 1.4/5 ratings share among adults aged 18–49. The episode received highly positive reviews, with critics praising the performances (particularly Amy Acker) and ending.

== Plot ==
Reese (Jim Caviezel) and Root (Amy Acker) go to Maple, New York to find a possible lead on Shaw's location. After a talk with Chief Wicker, they kidnap him after he sexually harasses Root and to get information on a truck that may have transported Shaw but Wicker reveals nothing.

Finch (Michael Emerson) visits Fusco (Kevin Chapman) at the precinct to ask for help in their new number: Albert Weiss (Mason Pettit). While watching him, Officer Dani Silva (Adria Arjona) spots Fusco and joins him, as Weiss is the prime suspect behind reported missing people. Fusco catches Weiss before he tries to kill a gang member named Marcus Young on a restaurant but Weiss knocks himself to falsely claim police brutality and is released from jail while Fusco can't come close to him or he will face suspension. Fusco and Silva realize that Young is no longer a gang member and has crucial information on the gang but refuses to testify, so the gang sent Weiss to kill him. They lure him into Silva's home and engage in a fight, with Silva shooting him to save Fusco, thus making her first kill.

Reese and Root find the truck in a backyard but only discover a stretcher and medical equipment, indicating that operatives tried to save Shaw from her blood loss. They question the town's doctor, who explains he didn't operate on anything but received a call from an anonymous person who asked for his advice while making a craniotomy. He also explains that he did not call the police since Maple has a history of job losses for those who ask too many questions and pose a threat to Carrow, a powerful company in the town. Reese and Root deduce that Samaritan is running the company.

Without many options, Reese and Root kidnap Mapple's Mayor Leslie Thompson (Maddie Corman), who is connected to Carrow. They interrogate her and she reveals that she only follows instructions from e-mails under death threats. She also reveals she supposedly died in Pittsburgh only to wake up with a pacemaker on Maple. Unsatisfied, Root tortures Thompson by drilling a hole in her hand and they discover that Shaw was seen alive in the factory. Finch deduces that Samaritan is experimenting with Maple as an "ant farm" to study human nature by giving them happiness and then altering its state.

They sneak in Carrow, finding that Samaritan is working on transponders to keep track of the town's citizens. They also find a secretary from the stock exchange, Delia Jones, one of many innocent people who Samaritan is experimenting on with neural implants. This confirms that Shaw was not seen and her whereabouts are unknown. Amidst gunfire, Reese and Root escape with Delia. Delia is given a new ID but Samaritan abandons Maple, which will inevitably lead to its collapse. Finch meets with Root, who demands the Machine to reveal anything to her about Shaw. A payphone rings but the Machine only says, "Stop", infuriating Root and causing her to leave. The episode ends with John Greer (John Nolan) talking with someone in a hospital bed, revealed to be Shaw (Sarah Shahi), who is alive.

== Reception ==
=== Viewers ===
In its original American broadcast, "M.I.A." was seen by an estimated 9.28 million household viewers and gained .1.4/5 ratings share among adults aged 18–49, according to Nielsen Media Research. This means that 1.4 percent of all households with televisions watched the episode, while 5 percent of all households watching television at that time watched it. This was a 9% decrease in viewership from the previous episode, which was watched by 10.16 million viewers with a 1.7/5 in the 18-49 demographics. With these ratings, Person of Interest was the third most watched show on CBS for the night, behind NCIS: New Orleans and NCIS, second on its timeslot and sixth for the night in the 18-49 demographics, behind MasterChef Junior, Chicago Fire, Shark Tank, NCIS: New Orleans, and NCIS.

With Live +7 DVR factored in, the episode was watched by 12.92 million viewers with a 2.3 in the 18-49 demographics.

=== Critical reviews ===
"M.I.A." received highly positive reviews from critics. Matt Fowler of IGN gave the episode a "great" 8.8 out of 10 rating and wrote in his verdict, "Though I was morbidly enjoying the heartache of not knowing Shaw's fate, 'M.I.A.' effectively acted like the final chapter of this particular arc. Even though it was an advertised trilogy, the fact that we got a concrete answer regarding her made this installment the true bookend. It also returned Samaritan to the state of being an ethereal cyber-ghoul - which is when its truly at its most frightening. A chilling tale with a gripping end."

Alexa Planje of The A.V. Club gave the episode an "A−" grade and wrote, "Samaritan may be causing mayhem in Smalltown USA instead of the Big Apple this week, but that doesn't mean that its ambitions have been reduced in any way."
