= The Cold War (Person of Interest) =

- Person of Interest episode
- Episode no.: Season 4 Episode 10
- Directed by: Michael Offer
- Written by: Amanda Segel
- Cinematography by: David Insley
- Editing by: Scott A. Jacobs
- Production code: 3J5410
- Original air date: December 16, 2014
- Running time: 43 minutes

Guest appearances
- Julian Ovenden as Jeremy Lambert; Cara Buono as Martine Rousseau; John Nolan as John Greer; Emrhys Cooper as Young John Greer; Michael Siberry as Blackwood; Alexie Gilmore as Rachel Farrow; Oakes Fegley as Gabriel Hayward

Episode chronology
← Previous "The Devil You Know"	Next → "If-Then-Else"

"The Cold War" is the 10th episode of the fourth season of the American television drama series Person of Interest. It is the 78th overall episode of the series and is written by co-executive producer Amanda Segel and directed by Michael Offer. It aired on CBS in the United States and on CTV in Canada on December 16, 2014.

The series revolves around a computer program for the federal government known as "The Machine" that is capable of collating all sources of information to predict terrorist acts and to identify people planning them. A team, consisting of John Reese, Harold Finch and Sameen Shaw follow "irrelevant" crimes: lesser level of priority for the government. However, their security and safety is put in danger following the activation of a new program named Samaritan. In the episode, Samaritan starts going after irrelevant numbers in order to lure the Machine out of hiding. After the Machine refuses to reveal itself, Samaritan decides to amplify the crime in the city. The title refers to the phrase "Cold war", a state of conflict between nations that does not involve direct military action but is pursued primarily through economic and political actions, propaganda, acts of espionage or proxy wars waged by surrogates.

According to Nielsen Media Research, the episode was seen by an estimated 8.94 million household viewers and gained a 1.3/4 ratings share among adults aged 18–49. The episode received highly positive reviews, with critics praising Amy Acker's performance, the writing, ending, and the talk between the Machine and Samaritan.

== Plot ==
=== Flashbacks ===
In 1973, in London, a young John Greer (Emrhys Cooper) works as an MI6 agent. He is assigned to eliminate Oleg Luski, an undercover KGB agent living in London. That night, Greer and another agent pursue Luski on the streets. Greer shoots Luski but Luski kills the other agent. He interrogates Luski, who confesses that he works for MI6 and that his employer was Greer's Deputy Chief Blackwood (Michael Siberry), a KGB member. Greer decides to let Luski live and exits MI6. Greer then confronts Blackwood for his actions and kills him in his office. He then takes his file and burns it down.

=== Present day ===
Finch (Michael Emerson) and Root (Amy Acker) convince Shaw (Sarah Shahi) to stay in the train station until Samaritan stops pursuing her. Reese (Jim Caviezel), meanwhile, has been following the new number: Rachel Farrow (Alexie Gilmore), a victim of abuse by her husband. However, a Samaritan operative, Jeremy Lambert (Julian Ovenden) arrives and convinces Rachel not to kill her husband. Rachel's husband then dies in the street, having been poisoned by Lambert.

The team wonders what are the intentions of Samaritan as it doesn't follow irrelevant numbers. Looking for information, they find that Samaritan is taking cases from The Machine in order to lure it out of hiding. The team attempts to continue saving numbers but Samaritan proves to be many steps ahead of them. Root intercepts Lambert in an alley, who explains that Samaritan wants to talk with the Machine. When the Machine refuses to talk, Samaritan continues expanding its detection of threats, causing Fusco (Kevin Chapman) and the rest of the precinct to exhaustively pursue criminals. It's also starting to cause chaos in the city, with huge amounts of traffic and a rise in crime. Root receives a message from the Machine, who intends to talk with Samaritan.

Root then goes to New Rochelle, New York to meet at a school. To her surprise, she finds a young boy named Gabriel Hayward (Oakes Fegley), who acts as a speaker for Samaritan. The Machine and Samaritan then start talking through them, where both defend their ideologies and beliefs in their systems. Samaritan reaffirms that it will destroy the Machine and only questions if the Machine plans to let its agents die with her.

Greer (John Nolan) talks with Lambert about the new progress on Samaritan and its new intentions on "fixing" the wrongs of the world. With the rising crime wave, Shaw decides to leave the station to help. Finch discovers this and calls Root to let her know about the situation. Greer then sees as Samaritan starts his new phase: accessing the New York Stock Exchange, intending to crash the stock market.

== Reception ==
=== Viewers ===
In its original American broadcast, "The Cold War" was seen by an estimated 8.94 million household viewers and gained a 1.3/4 ratings share among adults aged 18–49, according to Nielsen Media Research. This means that 1.3 percent of all households with televisions watched the episode, while 4 percent of all households watching television at that time watched it. This was a 2% decrease in viewership from the previous episode, which was watched by 9.04 million viewers with a 1.7/5 in the 18-49 demographics. With these ratings, Person of Interest was the third most watched show on CBS for the night, behind NCIS: New Orleans and NCIS, second on its timeslot and sixth for the night in the 18-49 demographics, behind MasterChef Junior, A Charlie Brown Christmas, NCIS: New Orleans, NCIS, and The Voice.

With Live +7 DVR factored in, the episode was watched by 12.99 million viewers with a 2.4 in the 18-49 demographics.

=== Critical reviews ===
"The Cold War" received highly positive reviews from critics. Matt Fowler of IGN gave the episode a "great" 8.6 out of 10 rating and wrote in his verdict, "'The Cold War' set up the pieces for what looks to be a catastrophic middle chapter of this trilogy. There was a lot of great build here, even though it sort of left us hanging at the end in a true 'to be continued' sense. Samaritan appeared to be crashing the stock market in an attempt to finally reveal itself to the world as something to heed-slash-worship, and Shaw's decision to help could spell out doom for everyone involved. So there's certainly a lot of tension mounted in place."

Alexa Planje of The A.V. Club gave the episode an "A" grade and wrote, "'The Cold War' is a great episode for many reasons, but chief among them is because it's a master class in well-paced escalation. This is the kind of episode that aspiring television writers should break down and analyze more closely."
