= Siberry =

Siberry is a surname. Notable people with the surname include:

- Jane Siberry (born 1955), Canadian singer-songwriter
- Michael Siberry (born 1956), Australian actor
