= Prophets (Person of Interest) =

- Person of Interest episode
- Episode no.: Season 4 Episode 5
- Directed by: Kenneth Fink
- Written by: Lucas O'Connor
- Cinematography by: David Insley
- Editing by: Ryan Malanaphy
- Production code: 3J5405
- Original air date: October 21, 2014
- Running time: 43 minutes

Guest appearances
- Brett Cullen as Nathan Ingram; Cara Buono as Martine Rousseau; Wrenn Schmidt as Dr. Iris Campbell; John Nolan as John Greer; Kevin Kilner as Nick Dawson; Anthony Arkin as Mike Fisher; Caris Vujcec as Michelle Perez; Michael Bryan French as Governor James Murray; Ned Van Zandt as Kevin Hatch; Jason Ritter as Simon Lee

Episode chronology
← Previous "Brotherhood"	Next → "Pretenders"

"Prophets" is the 5th episode of the fourth season of the American television drama series Person of Interest. It is the 73rd overall episode of the series and is written by Lucas O'Connor and directed by Kenneth Fink. It aired on CBS in the United States and on CTV in Canada on October 21, 2014.

The series revolves around a computer program for the federal government known as "The Machine" that is capable of collating all sources of information to predict terrorist acts and to identify people planning them. A team, consisting of John Reese, Harold Finch and Sameen Shaw follow "irrelevant" crimes: lesser level of priority for the government. However, their security and safety is put in danger following the activation of a new program named Samaritan. In the episode, the team must save a political pollster as it appears he intends to commit a crime after his forecast is proven to be false. However, they realize that Samaritan is behind all the events and plans to kill the man.

According to Nielsen Media Research, the episode was seen by an estimated 9.40 million household viewers and gained a 1.5/5 ratings share among adults aged 18–49. The episode received near critical acclaim, with critics praising character development, action scenes and Amy Acker's performance, particularly during her talk with Michael Emerson's character.

== Plot ==
=== Flashbacks ===
On October 13, 2001, the Machine's first day, Finch (Michael Emerson) starts teaching the Machine about a survival scenario. Nathan Ingram (Brett Cullen) arrives to see the progress and both find that the Machine has an additional code on its data. The Machine claims Finch himself added it but Finch is certain the Machine was the one who added it and shuts it down to reprogram it.

On November 29, 2001, The Machine's new "first day", Ingram is denied access to the Machine despite being Admin. He attempts to log in through his computer but Finch realizes that the Machine is hacking Ingram's computer and even ignores Finch's reprogramming commands. This forces Finch to unplug the Machine to shut it down.

On December 31, 2001, another "first day" for the Machine, the Machine burns a server after being refused to go out, planning to kill Finch by removing the oxygen. Finch extingues the fires and expresses his concerns to Ingram, wanting to show the Machine "how to care".

=== Present day ===
After shooting a scam artist who tried to commit suicide by cop, Reese (Jim Caviezel) is forced by Internal Affairs to attend therapy with Dr. Iris Campbell (Wrenn Schmidt).

Finch assigns Shaw (Sarah Shahi) to investigate their new number, Simon Lee (Jason Ritter), political pollster and member of New York Governor James Murray's reelection campaign. Simon is confident in Murray's victory, predicting a 52–48 lead. However, the results turn out to be inversed and Michelle Perez is elected Governor. This causes Murray's campaign manager to punch Simon and Finch sees that anyone of their campaign team could attack Simon. While his campaign team and Murray himself accept their loss, Simon is convinced that the elections were rigged. Meanwhile, Reese starts his therapy sessions with Dr. Campbell. His attempts to build trust and fake interest are soon discovered by Campbell, who asks for more cooperation on his behalf.

Shaw follows Simon to the New York State Board of Elections where she is joined by Root (Amy Acker), who is there due to the Machine. An employee who was fired shows up with a gun, intent to kill the Election Commissioner but Shaw stops him by shooting him in the knees. However, this gives Root a realization: Samaritan itself rigged the elections by erasing data and intends to kill Simon to tie up loose ends. Finch concludes that Samaritan intends to use newly elected Michelle Perez for its purposes and asks for Root's help in convincing Perez to resign. They find vital information that she worked as an escort 20 years ago and attempt to blackmail her to resign. At a conference, Finch, Root and Shaw spot Simon intending to confront Perez and notice an assassin, Martine Rousseau (Cara Buono) appearing to kill Simon. However, Perez faints and dies at the ceremony and team realizes the assassin wasn't for Simon but for her.

Simon now becomes the new target of Samaritan and it orders Rousseau to kill him. The team then works to guide Simon (without him knowing) and avoid cameras so Samaritan can't find him. A paranoid Simon then books a hotel room to hide while Finch shuts down surveillance cameras and cuts Internet access on Simon's room. However, Simon is identified after asking for a maid's phone, which gives Samaritan and Rousseau his location. In order to distract her and help Simon, Root begins a shootout with Rousseau, both ending up wounded. Reese and Shaw then intercept Simon and take him to a safe place.

At his campaign office, Simon is visited by Finch using an alias. Finch convinces Simon that his numbers were incorrect and that nothing important is happening. This causes Samaritan to stop deeming Simon "threat". Finch finds Root, who is recuperating while going under another alias. She defends their actions in changing Simon's personality, as he was in danger and Root reiterates that the difference between the Machine and Samaritan is Finch himself. In his next therapy session, Reese opens up about his personality, admitting to feeling affected by Carter's death. Greer (John Nolan) visits Nick Dawson (Kevin Kilner), Perez's Lieutenant Governor and officially the new Governor, planning to be involved with him. As they watch Dawson giving a speech on television, Greer and Martine discuss Samaritan's plans to gain political control. Finch is walking through the streets when he turns to a camera and tells the Machine that it's time they have a talk.

== Reception ==
=== Viewers ===
In its original American broadcast, "Prophets" was seen by an estimated 9.40 million household viewers and gained a 1.5/5 ratings share among adults aged 18–49, according to Nielsen Media Research. This means that 1.5 percent of all households with televisions watched the episode, while 5 percent of all households watching television at that time watched it. This was a 4% decrease in viewership from the previous episode, which was watched by 9.72 million viewers with a 1.5/5 in the 18-49 demographics. With these ratings, Person of Interest was the third most watched show on CBS for the night, behind NCIS: New Orleans and NCIS, second on its timeslot and eighth for the night in the 18-49 demographics, behind Agents of S.H.I.E.L.D., Marry Me, Chicago Fire, NCIS: New Orleans, NCIS, The Voice, and the first game of the 2014 World Series.

With Live +7 DVR factored in, the episode was watched by 13.27 million viewers with a 2.4 in the 18-49 demographics.

=== Critical reviews ===
"Prophets" received near critical acclaim from critics. Matt Fowler of IGN gave the episode an "amazing" 9.2 out of 10 rating and wrote in his verdict, "'Prophets' was dangerous and thrilling. The only way it really could have been better was if Root had died. And I say that knowing that she's my favorite character. I'm just a huge fan of raised stakes, large losses, and pyrrhic victories. And I love feeling crappy. What can I say? Either way though, not only was this episode inventive and action-packed, but it gave us a glimpse of some of Samaritan's larger steps toward full domination - involving controllable politicians. And while we still focus in on Greer, villain-wise, because he's human and reachable, he wasn't kidding when he said he was going to take orders from Samaritan."

Alexa Planje of The A.V. Club gave the episode an "A" grade and wrote, "The fact that one episode can deliver great character work, philosophy, and action demonstrates the high level that Person of Interest is capable of achieving."

Sean McKenna of TV Fanatic gave the episode a 4.5 star rating out of 5 and wrote "There really is so much going on in the hour that manages to bring about that suspense, mystery, humor, drama and focus on characters, all while mixing the big stories with the small. It makes me enthusiastically want to know what's next as the hour finds a way to cap things off at the same time it opens the doors to something more."
