= Point of Origin (Person of Interest) =

- Person of Interest episode
- Episode no.: Season 4 Episode 8
- Directed by: Richard J. Lewis
- Written by: Tony Camerino
- Cinematography by: Gonzalo Amat
- Editing by: Ryan Malanaphy
- Production code: 3J5408
- Original air date: November 18, 2014
- Running time: 43 minutes

Guest appearances
- Adria Arjona as Dani Silva; Cara Buono as Martine Rousseau; Wrenn Schmidt as Dr. Iris Campbell; Winston Duke as Dominic Besson; John Nolan as John Greer; Mike Figueroa as Alex Ortiz; Jessica Pimentel as Floyd; Andreas Damm as Romeo; Luis Da Silva as Garcia; Jake Silbermann as Phil Cain

Episode chronology
← Previous "Honor Among Thieves"	Next → "The Devil You Know"

"Point of Origin" is the 8th episode of the fourth season of the American television drama series Person of Interest. It is the 76th overall episode of the series and is written by Tony Camerino and directed by Richard J. Lewis. It aired on CBS in the United States and on CTV in Canada on November 18, 2014.

The series revolves around a computer program for the federal government known as "The Machine" that is capable of collating all sources of information to predict terrorist acts and to identify people planning them. A team, consisting of John Reese, Harold Finch and Sameen Shaw follow "irrelevant" crimes: lesser level of priority for the government. However, their security and safety is put in danger following the activation of a new program named Samaritan. In the episode, the team investigates a NYPD recruit in the academy training with Reese serving as her instructor. However, evidence points that the recruit is not what it seems to be and there's a possible mole in the squad. Despite being credited, Amy Acker does not appear in the episode.

According to Nielsen Media Research, the episode was seen by an estimated 9.87 million household viewers and gained a 1.6/5 ratings share among adults aged 18–49. The episode received positive reviews, although critics felt the main case was "weak".

== Plot ==
The new number is from Dani Silva (Adria Arjona), a NYPD recruit. Using his detective position, Reese (Jim Caviezel) serves as her field instructor. Despite being pressured by Dr. Campbell (Wrenn Schmidt) to attend therapy, Reese continues delaying it or just not showing up.

Greer (John Nolan) assigns Martine Rousseau (Cara Buono) to find more information on the virus robbery and find those responsible. She visits Katya, who was arrested and forced out of the team, and receives the information that she worked for Romeo (Andreas Damm) after she threatens the life of a young girl, presumably Katya's daughter. She then visits Romeo at his bar, where she subdues him and his henchman and forces him to reveal an address.

The team discovers that Silva is already a cop, having been assigned by Internal Affairs to infiltrate training and find a possible mole in her squad. Reese then saves Silva from a drive-by shooting and confesses her real role. Fusco (Kevin Chapman) and Shaw (Sarah Shahi) follow the shooter to a gym where he meets with members of The Brotherhood. Through cues, Finch (Michael Emerson) eventually realizes that "Mini" is actually Dominic (Winston Duke), leader of the gang. Later that night, Dominic meets with the mole, Officer Ortiz (Mike Figueroa). Ortiz is ordered to Silva's files from her supervisor as well as stealing files from the academy's commandant for Dominic.

Reese and Silva find that her supervisor has been killed at his home and evidence points to Silva. Gathering evidence with Reese and Fusco, Silva deduces that Ortiz is the mole. They locate him in Spanish Harlem and save Ortiz from being killed by Cartel members. They flee when a Cartel member activates an alarm, taking Ortiz with them. Pursued by hitmen, they escape through a pool to the sewers and Ortiz is arrested. Dominic then meets with the cartel leader and kills him.

Ortiz's confession exonerates Silva and improves Reese's standing in front of Internal Affairs. Reese then talks with Finch about the connections with Dominic and is informed of their new number: Carl Elias. Samaritan has seemingly located Shaw at her job and sends Rousseau there. She tries contacting Shaw with the same app that Romeo used but she keeps declining calls. She receives a slightly more corrected picture of Shaw and recognizes her. Shaw immediately sees Rousseau as she draws her weapon out.

== Reception ==
=== Viewers ===
In its original American broadcast, "Point of Origin" was seen by an estimated 9.87 million household viewers and gained a 1.6/5 ratings share among adults aged 18–49, according to Nielsen Media Research. This means that 1.6 percent of all households with televisions watched the episode, while 5 percent of all households watching television at that time watched it. This was a 8% increase in viewership from the previous episode, which was watched by 9.11 million viewers with a 1.3/4 in the 18-49 demographics. With these ratings, Person of Interest was the third most watched show on CBS for the night, behind NCIS: New Orleans and NCIS, second on its timeslot and fifth for the night in the 18-49 demographics, behind Chicago Fire, NCIS: New Orleans, NCIS, and The Voice.

With Live +7 DVR factored in, the episode was watched by 13.70 million viewers with a 2.5 in the 18-49 demographics.

=== Critical reviews ===
"Point of Origin" received positive reviews from critics. Matt Fowler of IGN gave the episode a "great" 8 out of 10 rating and wrote in his verdict, "'Point of Origin' was good, but we all know the heights POI can reach. The 'number of the week' tied into Dominic and his plot to take out Elias, so nothing here was disposable. Not at all. But this also wasn't POI firing on all cylinders. Though it sure looks like next week's chapter will be."

Alexa Planje of The A.V. Club gave the episode an "A−" grade and wrote, "Person of Interest is so compelling partly because of its interest in psychology and human behavior, but also because it takes the time to reveal characters' specific thought processes. Sometimes telling can be just as effective as showing. At this juncture, the combination of both makes anticipation for the inevitable showdowns all the more thrilling."
