= Honor Among Thieves (Person of Interest) =

- Person of Interest episode
- Episode no.: Season 4 Episode 7
- Directed by: Sylvain White
- Written by: David Slack
- Cinematography by: David Insley
- Editing by: Mark Conte
- Production code: 3J5407
- Original air date: November 11, 2014
- Running time: 43 minutes

Guest appearances
- Adrian Bellani as Tomas Koroa; David Vadim as Marko Jevtic; Johnny Sparks as Jared Wilkins; Nick E. Tarabay as Devon Grice; Drew Hildebrand as Henrik Lengfelder

Episode chronology
← Previous "Pretenders"	Next → "Point of Origin"

"Honor Among Thieves" is the 7th episode of the fourth season of the American television drama series Person of Interest. It is the 75th overall episode of the series and is written by co-executive producer David Slack and directed by Sylvain White. It aired on CBS in the United States and on CTV in Canada on November 11, 2014.

The series revolves around a computer program for the federal government known as "The Machine" that is capable of collating all sources of information to predict terrorist acts and to identify people planning them. A team, consisting of John Reese, Harold Finch and Sameen Shaw follow "irrelevant" crimes: lesser level of priority for the government. However, their security and safety is put in danger following the activation of a new program named Samaritan. In the episode, the team follows a wine dealer who is also a thief. Shaw joins his crew to find more information and the team realizes they're facing a virus threat. Meanwhile, Finch helps Root in following a man with close ties to Samaritan.

According to Nielsen Media Research, the episode was seen by an estimated 9.11 million household viewers and gained a 1.3/4 ratings share among adults aged 18–49. The episode received positive reviews, with critics mostly praising Sarah Shahi's performance and Shaw's character development.

== Plot ==
After Shaw (Sarah Shahi) breaks contact with her heist team, she joins Reese (Jim Caviezel) in following their new number: Tomas Koroa (Adrian Bellani), an international wine dealer. Shaw follows Tomas and finds him meeting with thieves and his team robs a jewelry store.

The team plants cocaine on one of the heist members, forcing Fusco (Kevin Chapman) to arrest her. With a vacant spot, Shaw is allowed to join Tomas' team. She helps them in infiltrating at a hotel safe and steal the vault during Veterans Day. Tomas opens the vault but instead of money, it's a box containing vials with "MARV" written on it. Suddenly, Tomas' team betrays him and try to kill him but he escapes with the help of Shaw. Reese inspects the hideout to find the vials and Tomas' team gone. Finch (Michael Emerson) discovers that the vials contained the Marburg virus, an extremely dangerous virus.

Meanwhile, Root (Amy Acker) is working on another alias and her new target is Jared Wilkins (Johnny Sparks), a man directly related to newly elected Governor Dawson and founder of new nonprofit OTPS. She poses as a nanny for his son and with Finch's help, finds that Wilkins' company is not a threat to them. However, Root's phone starts being hacked, possibly by Samaritan, and she drops it on a tank and flees the apartment. They deduce that OTPS is giving every student a tablet for educational use, which seems to be powered by Samaritan software. Samaritan plants more cameras on Wilkins' company, it gets more complicated to learn more about it. Root then steals the identity of a woman to gain access and shut down the cameras, which allows Finch to infiltrate as a janitor and destroy the system due to concerns about it spreading Samaritan's influence.

Reese discovers the corpses of Tomas' team, having been killed by their client, and no sign of the vials. Finch tracks the location of the vials to a storage unit. There, Tomas recognizes Marko Jevtic (David Vadim), a member of his team who supposedly died years ago. To complicate matters, Shaw also recognizes two government agents, one of which includes Devon Grice (Nick E. Tarabay), her former apprentice, who have been given Marko as a relevant number due to the danger of his possession of the virus. They receive orders to destroy the virus and kill anyone involved which is later changed to securing the virus for Samaritan.

Shaw and Tomas infiltrate to find the vials but are intercepted by Marko, who plans to inject them with the virus, revealing that his employer intends to start a global pandemic. As Grice and his partner arrive, they are ambushed by Reese and Fusco. This allows Shaw and Tomas to escape from Marko after subduing his team. Grice finds Shaw and allows her to escape with the virus while his partner kills Marko. Tomas leaves for Barcelona and Shaw declines his offer to join him. Finch is left concerned by the collateral damage of their war with Samaritan and he questions what he is capable of doing for the greater good. Before parting for his next mission, Grice deletes security surveillance where he allowed Shaw to go. Samaritan retrieves the video and starts repairing it, eventually finding a trace of Shaw's face although she is still unrecognizable.

== Reception ==
=== Viewers ===
In its original American broadcast, "Honor Among Thieves" was seen by an estimated 9.11 million household viewers and gained a 1.3/4 ratings share among adults aged 18–49, according to Nielsen Media Research. This means that 1.3 percent of all households with televisions watched the episode, while 4 percent of all households watching television at that time watched it. This was a 7% decrease in viewership from the previous episode, which was watched by 9.72 million viewers with a 1.7/5 in the 18-49 demographics. With these ratings, Person of Interest was the third most watched show on CBS for the night, behind NCIS: New Orleans and NCIS, second on its timeslot and eighth for the night in the 18-49 demographics, behind The Flash, Agents of S.H.I.E.L.D., MasterChef Junior, NCIS: New Orleans, Chicago Fire, NCIS, and The Voice.

With Live +7 DVR factored in, the episode was watched by 13.07 million viewers with a 2.3 in the 18-49 demographics.

=== Critical reviews ===
"Honor Among Thieves" received positive reviews from critics. Matt Fowler of IGN gave the episode a "great" 8.5 out of 10 rating and wrote in his verdict, "'Honor Among Thieves' was a great Shaw episode, an even greater Shaw/Root episode (even though things still remain unsaid), and it ended on a game-changing moment that may force Team Machine's hand in the near future."

Alexa Planje of The A.V. Club gave the episode a "B" grade and wrote, "Even when it falters, Person of Interest remains relevant because of its ability to focus in on the specific while keeping an eye on the big picture. Society is a tangled web and this show maintains its curiosity, searching for storytelling opportunities in every strand."
