= Michael Siberry =

Australian stage and screen actor (born 1956)

- Born: 1956 (age 69–70); Hobart, Tasmania, Australia
- Education: National Institute of Dramatic Art (BFA)
- Occupation: Actor

Michael Siberry (born 1956) is an Australian stage and screen actor.

== Life and career ==
Siberry was born in Hobart, Tasmania, Australia. He graduated from the National Institute of Dramatic Art in Sydney, Australia and began his career in Adelaide at the State Theatre Company of South Australia before moving to England to perform for the Royal Shakespeare Company.

On Broadway, Siberry has performed the likes of Nicholas Nickleby in The Life and Adventures of Nicholas Nickleby, Gratiano in The Merchant of Venice, Captain Georg von Trapp in The Sound of Music and Shakespeare in The Frogs (Lincoln Center).

Other theatre credits include Morrell in Candida and Astrov in Uncle Vanya at the McCarter Theatre in Princeton, New Jersey and Osbourne in Journey's End, Oberon in A Midsummer Night's Dream and Billy Flynn in Chicago at London's West end theatre.

He portrayed King Arthur in the U.S. National Tour of Monty Python's Spamalot for two years before reprising it on Broadway in 2008.

In 2017, he performed as Leo Tresler in the Tony-nominated Broadway drama Junk at the Lincoln Center.

His notable television appearances include Strangers and Brothers, Sherlock Holmes; Jeeves and Wooster; Highlander; The Grand; Silent Witness; Victoria & Albert; House of Cards; Boardwalk Empire; The Blacklist; Jessica Jones; Madam Secretary; The Last Tycoon; Severance; and The Society. He had supporting roles in the films Boundaries of the Heart, Teen Agent, and Birdman.

== Filmography ==
Key
†	Denotes works that have not yet been released

=== Film ===
Year	Title	Role	Notes
1986	Biggles	Algy	
1988	Boundaries of the Heart	Arthur Pearson	
1991	Teen Agent	Richardson	
2014	Birdman	Larry	
2015	Experimenter	George Bellak	
2015	Coming Through the Rye	Mr. Dewitt	
2023	The Cab	The Cabbie	Short
2023	The Featherweight	Bill Lee	

=== Television ===
Year	Title	Role	Notes
1984	The Adventures of Sherlock Holmes	Woodley	Episode: "The Solitary Cyclist"
1984	Hay Fever	Simon Bliss	TV play
1986	Strike It Rich!	Stafford	8 episodes
1988	Noble House	Linbar Struan	4 episodes
1989	After the War	David Lucas	4 episodes
1990–1991	Jeeves and Wooster	Bingo Little	3 episodes
1991	Sherlock Holmes and the Leading Lady	Franz Winterhauser	TV film
1992	The Witches of Eastwick	Darryl Van Horne	TV film
1994	Under the Hammer	Nick Roper	5 episodes
1994	Highlander: The Series	Martin Hyde	Episode: "Prodigal Son"
1997–1998	The Grand	John Bannerman	12 episodes
1998	Silent Witness	Dr. James Reynolds	4 episodes
1999	Highlander: The Raven	Frank Brennan	Episode: "The Rogue"
2001	Beast	Dr. Beecham	2 episodes
2001	Victoria & Albert	Lord Uxbridge	TV film
2003	Rosemary & Thyme	Hugo Dainty	Episode: "A Simple Plot"
2011	Law & Order: Special Victims Unit	David Watson	Episode: "Bully"
2013–2017	House of Cards	David Rasmussen	3 episodes
2014	Unforgettable	Sen. Thomas Carlyle	Episode: "D.O.A."
2014	Boardwalk Empire	Sen. Wendell Lloyd	2 episodes
2014	Person of Interest	Blackwood	Episode: "The Cold War"
2015	The Good Wife	Richard Dawkins	Episode: "Mind's Eye"
2015	The Blacklist	Agent Kilpatrick	Episode: "Karakurt (No. 55)"
2015	Madam Secretary	British Ambassador Graham Shenton	Episode: "The Long Shot"
2015	Jessica Jones	Albert Thompson	5 episodes
2015	Scream Queens	Butler	Episode: "Dorkus"
2016–2017	The Last Tycoon	Dr. George Gyssling	3 episodes
2019	The Society	Rogers Eliot	Episode: "What Happened?"
2019	Elementary	Carson Mayfield	Episode: "On the Scent"
2022-2025	Severance	Jame Eagan	5 episodes

Preceded by Jonathan Hadary	Actor playing King Arthur on Spamalot; 16 September 2008 - 11 January 2009 (close)	Succeeded by Incumbent
