= Nautilus (Person of Interest) =

- Person of Interest episode
- Episode no.: Season 4 Episode 2
- Directed by: Chris Fisher
- Written by: Dan Dietz & Melissa Scrivner Love
- Cinematography by: Gonzalo Amat
- Editing by: Ryan Malanaphy
- Production code: 3J5402
- Original air date: September 30, 2014
- Running time: 43 minutes

Guest appearances
- Quinn Shephard as Claire Mahoney; David Starzyk as David; Andreas Damm as Romeo

Episode chronology
← Previous "Panopticon"	Next → "Wingman"

"Nautilus" is the 2nd episode of the fourth season of the American television drama series Person of Interest. It is the 70th overall episode of the series and is written by Dan Dietz and Melissa Scrivner Love and directed by co-executive producer Chris Fisher. It aired on CBS in the United States and on CTV in Canada on September 30, 2014.

The series revolves around a computer program for the federal government known as "The Machine" that is capable of collating all sources of information to predict terrorist acts and to identify people planning them. A team, consisting of John Reese, Harold Finch and Sameen Shaw follow "irrelevant" crimes: lesser level of priority for the government. However, their security and safety is put in danger following the activation of a new program named Samaritan. In the episode, the team must follow a girl who is trying to finish a puzzle game that proves to be far more dangerous than expected. The title refers to "Nautilus", a pelagic marine mollusc of the cephalopod family Nautilidae.

According to Nielsen Media Research, the episode was seen by an estimated 10.72 million household viewers and gained a 1.8/6 ratings share among adults aged 18–49. The episode received very positive reviews, with critics praising the writing, questions and ending, although some expressed dissatisfaction with the episode's pace.

== Plot ==
Reese (Jim Caviezel) sets up a dinner with Finch (Michael Emerson) at a restaurant. However, Reese reveals that he is not attending and he only sent Finch so he could check their new number: Claire Mahoney (Quinn Shephard), a very intelligent young mathematician. Finch starts following Claire and finds that she is following locations and clues related to a Nautilus. Claire confronts him, asking if he is part of "the game".

Finch finds a pattern in multiple graffitis and finds that Claire participates in a Bongard problem puzzle. They locate the next puzzle at a bridge where Claire is nearly hit by cars until Reese saves her. A man arrives claiming to be her father but Finch finds that Claire lost her parents the year before so Reese tells her to run while he fights the man. Finch deduces that the purpose of the game puzzle is to locate a coded file. Shaw (Sarah Shahi) helps him in catching the source of the clues but the person affirms that he only puts out the clues' location for money and that the source is anonymous. Finch attempts to track the source but his computer malfunctions and he realizes the source is trying to track him. He destroys his computer and realizes that the creator of the game is Samaritan. Finch later visits Root (Amy Acker) for advice on whether or not to rejoin the fight, but Root simply reminds Finch of his lesson to the Machine that people make their own choices and he has to figure out what to do himself. Root is shown to be continuing her missions for the Machine.

Reese continues following Claire and subdues many hitmen who try to kill her, although she is unaware of this. He interrogates the hitmen, who are actually military, and finds that Claire stole files from Silverpool, a private military organization. The team follows Claire to the next clue, located at the observation deck on 30 Rockefeller Plaza. Finch fails to convince her to drop her quest and she sets out to find the next clue at The Octagon. Finch then tells Reese and Shaw that he no longer will try to protect Claire.

Claire goes to The Octagon's rooftop where she is instructed to turn on a switch. However, she finds that it's unplugged and she is cornered by Silverpool military men. However, they are killed by gunshots and Claire finds a cellphone, through which Samaritan tells her that it will protect her, recognizing her as an asset. The next day, Claire has gone missing and Silverpool comes under investigation for war crimes after the files that Claire stole are leaked to the press by Samaritan. Finch tells Reese that Silverpool worked on a network to detect threats, but the project is now dead after the leak. Samaritan had used Claire to get the files and kill a potential rival system by exposing Silverpool. He then shows Reese his new progress: a new base of operations at the Interborough Rapid Transit Company station. Shaw joins them and Finch decides to continue working with them.

== Reception ==
=== Viewers ===
In its original American broadcast, "Nautilus" was seen by an estimated 10.72 million household viewers and gained a 1.8/6 ratings share among adults aged 18–49, according to Nielsen Media Research. This means that 1.8 percent of all households with televisions watched the episode, while 6 percent of all households watching television at that time watched it. This was a slight increase in viewership from the previous episode, which was watched by 10.58 million viewers with a 1.7/5 in the 18-49 demographics. With these ratings, Person of Interest was the third most watched show on CBS for the night, behind NCIS: New Orleans and NCIS.

With Live +7 DVR factored in, the episode was watched by 14.87 million viewers with a 2.8 in the 18-49 demographics.

=== Critical reviews ===
"Nautilus" received very positive reviews from critics. Matt Fowler of IGN gave the episode an "amazing" 9 out of 10 rating and wrote in his verdict, "'Nautilus' was smart, fun, and strikingly ominous. It provided a haunting reminder of how dangerously ahead-of-the-curve Samaritan is while showing Finch that things will only get worse if he remained on the sidelines. And that the skilled people out there who could be recruited for good are now ripe for the plucking."

Alexa Planje of The A.V. Club gave the episode an "A−" grade and wrote, "'Nautilus' starts off slowly, but like any good puzzle, it finishes satisfactorily once all of the pieces have been put into their proper places."

Sean McKenna of TV Fanatic gave the episode a 4.3 star rating out of 5 and wrote "Only the second episode of Person of Interest Season 4, and with some fantastic scenic shots of New York, of course, the great cast and intriguing new direction for the story, things are already off to a positive start."
