= Guilty (Person of Interest) =

- Person of Interest episode
- Episode no.: Season 4 Episode 14
- Directed by: Kate Woods
- Written by: David Slack
- Cinematography by: David Insley
- Editing by: Mark Conte
- Production code: 3J5414
- Original air date: February 10, 2015
- Running time: 43 minutes

Guest appearances
- Blair Brown as Emma Blake; Paige Turco as Zoe Morgan; Wrenn Schmidt as Dr. Iris Campbell; Tina Benko as Cobb; Lillias White as Judge Reginald; Rich Topol as Phillip Ward; Bryan Terrell Clark as Tim Rollins

Episode chronology
← Previous "M.I.A."	Next → "Q&A"

"Guilty" is the 14th episode of the fourth season of the American television drama series Person of Interest. It is the 82nd overall episode of the series and is written by co-executive producer David Slack and directed by Kate Woods. It aired on CBS in the United States and on CTV in Canada on February 10, 2015.

The series revolves around a computer program for the federal government known as "The Machine" that is capable of collating all sources of information to predict terrorist acts and to identify people planning them. A team follows "irrelevant" crimes: lesser level of priority for the government. However, their security and safety is put in danger following the activation of a new program named Samaritan. In the episode, Reese and Finch decide to return to the numbers after having lost many lives in their fight against Samaritan. Finch is summoned to jury duty and his new colleague turns out to be their newest number, who is trying to go for a "guilty" verdict. Despite being credited, Amy Acker does not appear.

According to Nielsen Media Research, the episode was seen by an estimated 9.53 million household viewers and gained a 1.6/5 ratings share among adults aged 18–49. The episode received generally positive reviews, although critics criticized the lack of plot development.

== Plot ==
Reese (Jim Caviezel) and Finch (Michael Emerson) decide to work on the numbers, having missed a lot of cases for their fight against Samaritan. To avoid more losses, they decide to omit Fusco (Kevin Chapman) from their missions, returning to their old days. However, Finch is summoned to jury duty, leaving Reese in charge of the numbers.

Finch's duty involves the trial of a man charged with murdering his wife, the former CEO of a cellphone development company. Finch provokes the judge by appearing to be a conspiracy theorist and is dismissed. However, when another juror is dismissed for a phone call, Finch is called back, to his disappointment. He is seated next to a former schoolteacher named Emma Blake (Blair Brown). Despite her kindness, Finch prefers to avoid her.

Meanwhile, Reese attends his last obligatory therapy session with Dr. Iris Campbell (Wrenn Schmidt) and excuses his absence due to a tragedy in his family (Shaw's disappearance). Despite this, he still asks for regular sessions with Campbell. He then meets with Fusco and discovers that they received a new number: Emma. After talking with Finch, they start wondering if she is a perpetrator or a victim. After a juror suffers a anaphylactic shock, they conclude that someone is trying to fix the trial. With the help of Zoe Morgan (Paige Turco), the team gets a method of deduction and believe the jurors are pressured to give a "not guilty" verdict.

At court, Finch decides to go for a "guilty" vote but it turns out that Emma is actually going for a "guilty" verdict and the rest of the jurors are joining her. Finch stalls to get a "not guilty" verdict while Reese and Zoe try to deduce the real story. The jury is sequestered in a hotel, and one of the jurors attempts to kill Finch, but Reese intervenes. The man is actually a plant by the real perpetrator, the new CEO of the company. The murder was to prevent the dead CEO from withdrawing an expensive product which was deemed to be unsafe.

The new developments lead to dismissal of charges, and the real perpetrator is arrested. Fusco approaches Reese, acknowledging that he and Finch decided to omit him to protect him but intends to continue working with them. Zoe realizes Reese feels attracted to Campbell and despite her claims that it wouldn't last, Reese decides to open up more during his sessions. Reese and Finch then start working on 3 numbers which may be connected to Elias and The Brotherhood.

== Reception ==
=== Viewers ===
In its original American broadcast, "Guilty" was seen by an estimated 9.53 million household viewers and gained a 1.6/5 ratings share among adults aged 18–49, according to Nielsen Media Research. This means that 1.6 percent of all households with televisions watched the episode, while 5 percent of all households watching television at that time watched it. This was a 3% increase in viewership from the previous episode, which was watched by 9.28 million viewers with a 1.4/5 in the 18-49 demographics. With these ratings, Person of Interest was the third most watched show on CBS for the night, behind NCIS: New Orleans and NCIS, first on its timeslot and fifth for the night in the 18-49 demographics, behind two Fresh Off the Boat episodes, NCIS: New Orleans, and NCIS.

With Live +7 DVR factored in, the episode was watched by 13.37 million viewers with a 2.4 in the 18-49 demographics.

=== Critical reviews ===
"Guilty" received generally positive reviews from critics. Matt Fowler of IGN gave the episode a "great" 8.2 out of 10 rating and wrote in his verdict, "'Guilty' was a nice way to come down after all the heavy Root/Shaw business. A case-of-the-week episode that was made a bit more poignant by the fact that Finch and Reese were back to saving people as a two-man team (well, with Zoe) and by Reese's private sessions with Iris. It was also cool seeing Blair Brown pop up on something post-Fringe."

Alexa Planje of The A.V. Club gave the episode a "B+" grade and wrote, "Thanks to the signature Person of Interest wit and charm, this episode isn't wholly derivative of the typical law procedural episode, but the story's tidiness is at odds with the psychological undercurrents that the show wants to explore."
