= Gerardo Celasco =

American actor (born 1982)

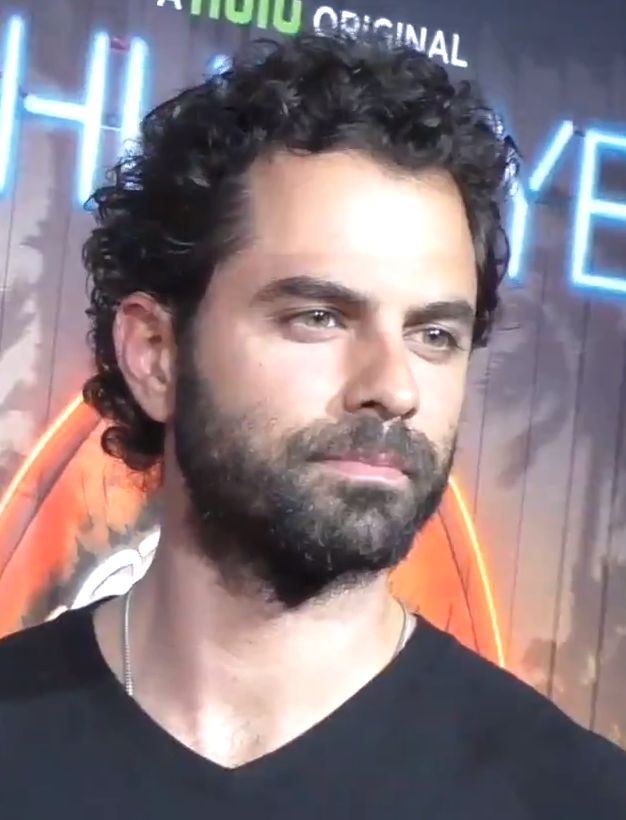
- Celasco in 2016
- Born: April 8, 1982 (age 44); Miami, Florida, U.S.
- Education: Southern Methodist University (BS)
- Occupation: Actor
- Years active: 2000–present
- Partner: Jennifer Morrison (2019–present)
- Children: 1

Gerardo Roberto Celasco (born April 8, 1982), also known as Adrian Bellani, is an American actor.

== Early life and education ==
Born in Miami, Celasco moved to his parents' home country El Salvador with his family as a child. He is the middle child and has two siblings - an older brother Sergio and a younger sister Sofia. He received his schooling at the Escuela Americana El Salvador, where he competed in international horse jumping competitions and competed in the AASCA Central America Games representing his country. Celasco also became an accomplished volleyball player and was again invited to partake in the Central America Games.

Celasco later returned to the United States to earn a Bachelor of Science degree in finance from Southern Methodist University.

== Career ==
After graduating from college, Salvadoran fashion photographer Roberto Aguilar asked Celasco to be the face of the Toni & Guy Bed Head campaign. He also appeared in Frankie J's music video for his song "And I Had You There".

People en Español magazine voted him as one of the 25 hottest Latin bachelors in the world in 2006. Celasco played Miguel Lopez-Fitzgerald on the NBC daytime drama Passions from 2006 to 2007. In 2007, he appeared with Passions co-star Heidi Mueller on The Tyra Banks Show to help host Tyra through "soap opera school".

In 2019, Celasco appeared as Xavier Castillo in the ABC series How to Get Away with Murder.

== Personal life ==
Celasco resides in Los Angeles but remains close with his family and visits them in San Salvador. As of 2019, Celasco was in a relationship with Jennifer Morrison. The couple announced their marriage in April 2022. In April 2024, Morrison revealed that the two had welcomed their first child by calling Celasco "the best dad".

== Filmography ==
=== Film ===
Year	Title	Role	Notes
2010	Las Angeles	Freddy	
2011	Moneyball	Carlos Peña	
2011	Pimp Bullies	Daniel	
2012	Battleship	Ensign Chavez	
2013	Greencard Warriors	Rigo	
2014	White Dwarf	Adrian	

=== Television ===
Year	Title	Role	Notes
2007	Heroes	Gilberto	Episode: "Four Months Ago..."
2011	RPM Miami	Alejandro 'Alex' Hernandez	13 episodes
2011	Rizzoli & Isles	Manny Vega	Episode: "Don't Hate the Player"
2013	Westside	Alex Deanne	Television film
2014	Cleaners	Joshua	2 episodes
2014	Person of Interest	Tomas Koroa	Episode: "Honor Among Thieves"
2014–2015	The Haves and the Have Nots	Carlos	9 episodes
2015	The Player	Suarez	Episode: "L.A. Takedown"
2017	Bones	Mark Kovac	2 episodes
2018	StartUp	Fernan	2 episodes
2019	S.W.A.T.	David Arias	Episode: "Los Huesos"
2019–2020	How to Get Away with Murder	Xavier Castillo	7 episodes
2020	Next	Ty Salazar	10 episodes
2022	Swimming with Sharks	Miles	6 episodes
2022	Good Sam	Dr. Nick Vega	3 episodes
2022	Devil in Ohio	Detective Lopez	8 episodes
2023	The Idol	Andres	Episode: "Daybreak"
2025	Pulse	Cam Fuentes	Episode: "Nothing Personal"
2025	The Waterfront	DEA Agent Marcus Sanchez	5 episodes
