= David Valcin =

American actor

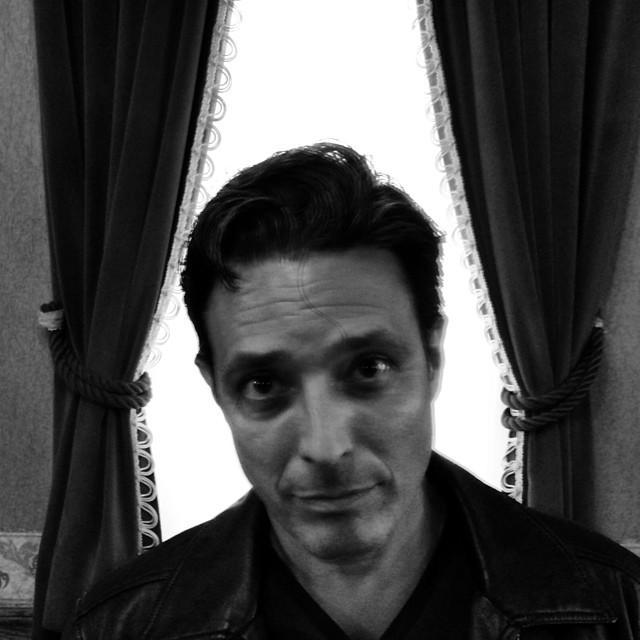
- David Valcin
- Born: David Neil DeMasi; Staten Island, NY
- Occupation: Actor
- Years active: 1992–present
- Spouse: Diane Murphy
- Children: 3

David Valcin is an American actor. He was born in Staten Island, and raised in Brooklyn and Quebec. He began acting in High School in a community theater called The Jubilee Players. Valcin studied at Earlham College in Richmond, Indiana and later studied acting at The Atlantic Theater Company in New York City and Vermont. He is best known for his recurring role as Anthony Marconi also known as Scarface, on the action drama Person of Interest.

Some of his other television acting credits include Just Shoot Me!, The Practice, The Guardian, Law & Order, Law & Order: Criminal Intent, Rescue Me, Third Watch, The Good Wife and Monk as well as having a recurring role as Eddie Fairbanks on the sitcom Two of a Kind (1998–1999), starring Mary-Kate and Ashley Olsen. He appeared in thirteen out of the twenty-two episodes of that series.

He has also appeared in the films Crocodile 2: Death Swamp (2002) and New Year's Eve (2011).

He currently lives in Manhattan, New York.
