= John Nolan (British actor) =

English actor (1938–2026)

- Born: 22 May 1938; Kent, England
- Died: 11 April 2026 (aged 87)
- Occupation: Actor
- Years active: 1965–2026
- Spouse: Kim Hartman (m. 1975)
- Children: 2
- Relatives: Christopher Nolan (nephew); Jonathan Nolan (nephew)

John Francis Nolan (22 May 1938 – 11 April 2026) was an English actor known for his roles as John Greer in Person of Interest, Nick Faunt in Shabby Tiger, and Wayne Enterprises board member Douglas Fredericks in Batman Begins and The Dark Knight Rises.

== Life and career ==
Nolan was born in London, England, on 22 May 1938. He was married to Kim Hartman from 1975 until his death; he had a son and a daughter. He was the paternal uncle of brothers Christopher and Jonathan Nolan.

He had a recurring role in his nephew Jonathan's television series Person of Interest as John Greer, a mysterious British figure connected with Decima Technologies and the main villain from seasons three to five of the show.

Nolan died on 11 April 2026, at the age of 87.

== Filmography ==
Year	Title	Role	Notes
1965	ITV Playhouse	Ray	TV series, Episode: "Lucky for Some"
1967	The Prisoner	Young Guest	TV series, Episode: "Do Not Forsake Me, Oh My Darling"
1969	Hadleigh	Mick	TV series, Episode: "Patron of the Arts"
1969	Strange Report	Cliff Hunt	TV series, Episode: "Report 8319: Grenade - What Price Change?"
1970	Daniel Deronda	Daniel Deronda	TV mini-series, all 6 Episodes
1970–1971	Doomwatch	Geoff Hardcastle	TV series, Series 2, 10 episodes
1973	Bequest to the Nation	Capt. Blackwood	Released in the US as The Nelson Affair
1973	Shabby Tiger	Nick Faunt	TV mini-series, all 7 Episodes
1974	Thriller	Marty Fuller	TV series, Episode: "In the Steps of a Dead Man"
1974	Marked Personal	Sean Carter	TV series, 2 Episodes: #1.51 and #1.52
1975	The Sweeney	Bernie Conway	TV series, Episode: "Golden Boy"
1975	Six Days of Justice	Dr. Bryant	TV series, Episode: "Belonging"
1976	Dickens of London	Willis	TV mini-series, Episode: "Success"
1977	Crown Court	Insp. Fleming	TV series, Episode: "A Sheep in Wolf's Clothing: Part 1"
1977	ITV Sunday Night Drama	Milos	TV series, Episode: "A Superstition"
1978	Terror	James Garrick	
1978	1990	Tomson	TV series, Episode: "Pentagons"
1978	Target	Scott Taylor	TV series, Episode: "The Trouble with Charlie"
1979	Return of the Saint	Corey	TV series, Episode: "Hot Run"
1979	The World Is Full of Married Men	Joe	
1980	Enemy at the Door	Paddy Burke	TV series, Episode: "The Education of Nils Borg"
1980	ITV Playhouse	Doctor	TV series, Episode: "A Rod of Iron"
1998	Following	The Policeman	
2001	Masterpiece Theatre	Balthazar	TV series, Episode: "The Merchant of Venice"
2003	Silent Witness	Mr. O'Gara	TV series, Episode: "Answering Fire: Part 1"
2005	Batman Begins	Fredericks	
2012	The Dark Knight Rises	Fredericks	
2013–2016	Person of Interest	John Greer	TV series, Seasons 2–5, 27 episodes
2017	Dunkirk	Blind Man	
2024	Dune: Prophecy	Speaker of the High Council	
