= Sarah Shahi =

American actress (born 1980)

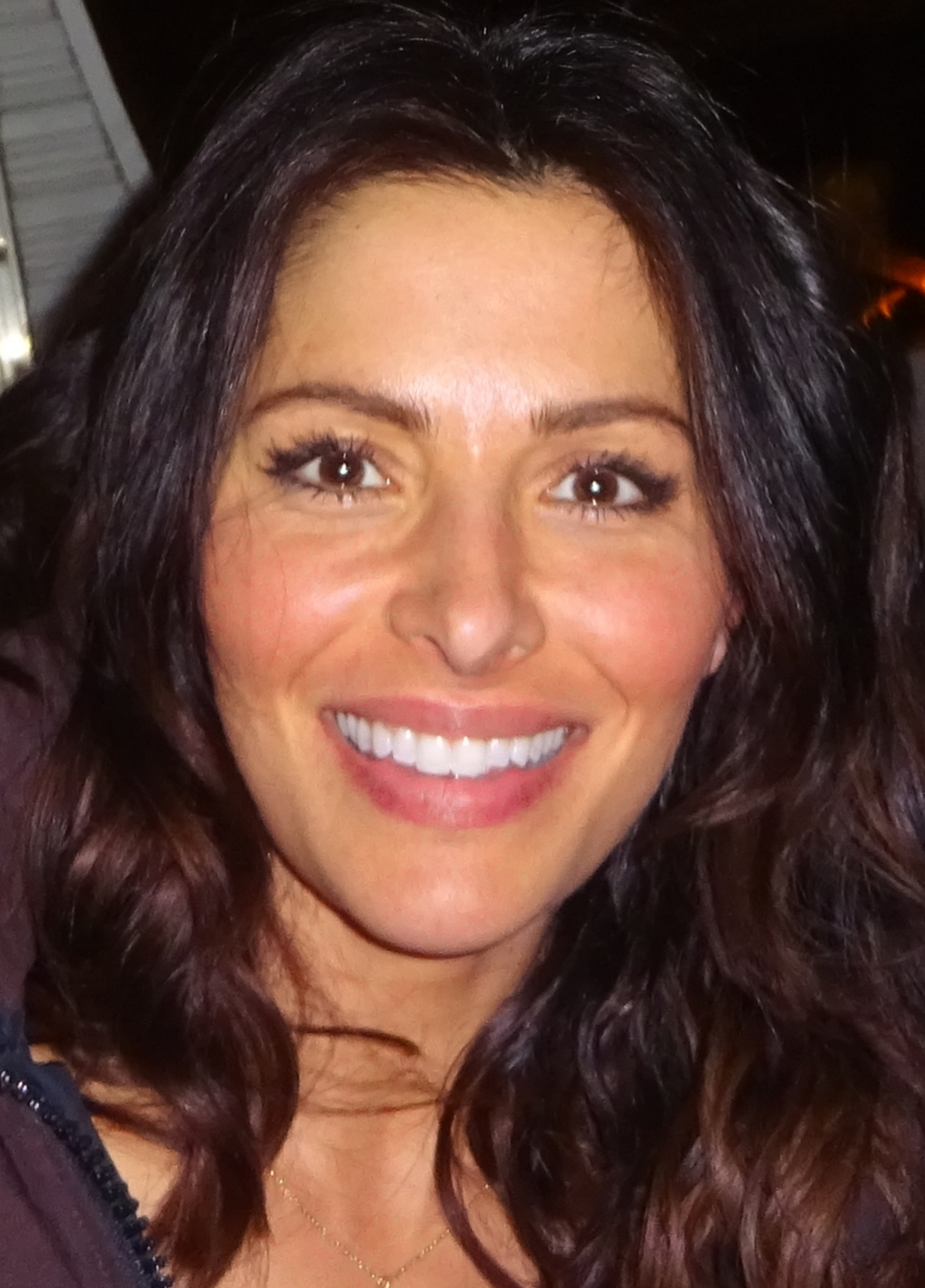
- Shahi in 2016
- Born: Aahoo Jahansouzshahi; January 10, 1980 (age 46); Euless, Texas, U.S.
- Education: Southern Methodist University
- Occupation: Actress
- Years active: 1997–present
- Spouse: Steve Howey (m. 2009; div. 2021)
- Children: 3

Aahoo Jahansouzshahi (born January 10, 1980), known professionally as Sarah Shahi, is an American actress. She played Carmen on The L Word in 2005, Kate Reed in the USA Network legal drama Fairly Legal (2011–2012), Sameen Shaw on the CBS crime drama Person of Interest (2012–2016), Billie on the Netflix series Sex/Life (2021–2023), and Dr. Gabriela Torabi in Hulu thriller series Paradise (2025–present). She portrayed the major character Det. Dani Reese in Life and had a supporting role in Alias. In 2018, she starred in the series Reverie. In 2019, she appeared in a recurring role in City on a Hill on Showtime, co-stars in the 2022 film Black Adam as Adrianna Tomaz, and appeared in seven episodes of the series The Rookie as hostage rescue specialist Jessica Russo. In 2023, she received praise for her role as White House Deputy Chief of Staff Zahra Bankston in Red, White & Royal Blue.

== Early life ==
Sarah Shahi was born Aahoo Jahansouzshahi on January 10, 1980 and raised in Euless, Texas. Her father, Abbas Jahansouzshahi, and her mother, Mahmonir Soroushazar, an interior designer, divorced when she was ten years old. Her mother is of Iranian and Spanish descent. Her father is from Iran. Her father's family left Iran two years before the Iranian Revolution. Her father, who was working at the American embassy in Iran, was slated for execution when the last Shah's regime collapsed in 1979, but was able to flee the country. Shahi has an older brother, Cyrus, and a younger sister, Samantha, who is a production assistant.

Her birth name, Aahoo (Persian: آهو), means 'gazelle' in Persian. Shahi adopted Sarah as her name in second grade after hearing the Starship song "Sara" because she was "tormented" by other children about her birth name, Aahoo. At her father's behest, she grew up speaking Persian in addition to English. Shahi's parents began entering her in beauty pageants at the age of eight. Shahi attended Trinity High School, and Southern Methodist University. She was a member of Alpha Chi Omega during her time at SMU. Shahi won the Miss Fort Worth pageant in 1997. Hoping to become an actress, she joined the Dallas Cowboys Cheerleaders (1999–2000) squad, despite not having cheered before. Later, she moved to Los Angeles.

== Career ==
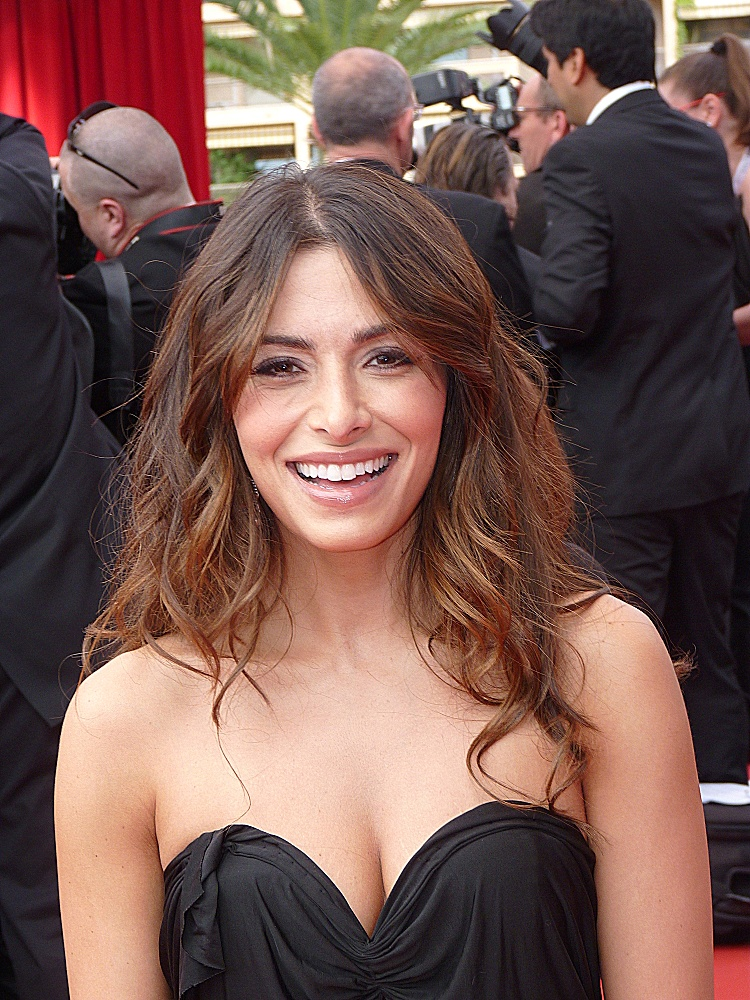
Shahi at the 2012 Monte-Carlo Television Festival

While working as an extra on the set of Dr. T and the Women in Texas, Shahi met director Robert Altman, who encouraged her to move to Hollywood, where she received roles in several series, including Alias, Dawson's Creek, Reba and Supernatural. In 2005, she appeared in the supporting character role of DJ Carmen de la Pica Morales on The L Word, which she joined in its second season. Shahi's two-year contract was not renewed after the end of the fourth season, and her character was written out. Also that same year, Shahi appeared in the pilot episode of Supernatural as Constance Welch, AKA The Woman in White, the first ghost that Dean Winchester (Jensen Ackles) and Sam Winchester (Jared Padalecki) encounter.

Shahi was named number 90 on the Maxim "Hot 100 of 2005" list, moving up to number 66 in 2006 and 36 in 2012. She appeared on the cover of Maxim's 2012 'TV's Hottest Girls' Issue in October 2012. She ranked number 5 on the AfterEllen.com hot list in 2007.

She played Farah in the second season of Sleeper Cell, and also appeared in HBO's The Sopranos in 2007, in the Season 6b episode "Kennedy and Heidi" as Sonya Aragon, a stripper and college student who spends a weekend with Tony after a death in his family. In 2007, she secured a small role in Rush Hour 3 as Zoe, a scantily clad rich girl who is pursued by Chris Tucker's character, Detective Carter.

In 2007, she took on her first permanent leading role on a TV series, co-starring with Damian Lewis in the NBC series Life as homicide detective Dani Reese. The series ran for two seasons.

In October 2009, Shahi landed the lead role in the USA Network pilot, Facing Kate. Shahi began filming in November 2009. The show followed the life of Kate Reed, a legal mediator who is frustrated with the bureaucracy and injustice she witnesses in the legal system. The series title was later changed to Fairly Legal. The show was cancelled after two seasons in November 2012.

Shahi was cast as a recurring love interest for Taylor Kinney's character Lt. Kelly Severide on NBC's show Chicago Fire in October 2012. She was cast in the recurring role of Sameen Shaw on Person of Interest, making her first appearance in the second-season episode "Relevance", which aired in February 2013. In May 2013, CBS president Nina Tassler announced that Shahi would be added as a series regular for its third season. She played the daughter of Sylvester Stallone's character in the 2012 action film Bullet to the Head. Her co-star on this film was Jason Momoa, who she worked with again in the 2014 film Road to Paloma. Following the January 7, 2015, episode of Person of Interest, Shahi and the show's producers announced she would be going on maternity leave.

In February 2016, she was cast as iconic detective Nancy Drew in a planned TV series based on the books. In May 2016, CBS passed on the series. Also in May, Shahi resumed her appearances as Shaw on Person of Interest, until June 21, 2016, when the show ended. She starred in the new TV series Reverie in 2018, but it was cancelled after one season.

In 2018, Shahi played a recurring role on The Rookie as Jessica Russo, a private security consultant and former FBI hostage rescue specialist, who becomes John Nolan's girlfriend. In 2019, Shahi joined the cast of Showtime's City on a Hill as recurring character Rachel Behnam, an investigator for the district attorney.

In August 2020, Shahi started filming Sex/Life, a Netflix series inspired by BB Easton's book "44 Chapters About 4 Men", in Toronto, Canada. She played Billie, a housewife struggling to remain a devoted wife and mother when tempted by an old flame and the freer days of her youth. In October, she was cast as Adrianna Tomaz in the 2022 DCEU film Black Adam opposite Dwayne Johnson and Pierce Brosnan.

== Personal life ==
Shahi married actor Steve Howey on February 7, 2009, in Las Vegas. In July 2009, she gave birth to their first child, a son, during an at-home water birth. In January 2015, she announced that she was pregnant with twins. In March, a daughter and son were born during another home birth. Shahi and Howey filed for divorce in May 2020. Their divorce was finalized in January 2021.

In 2021, Shahi revealed that she was in a relationship with Australian actor Adam Demos, whom she met on the set of Sex/Life. It was reported in April 2025 that Shahi had ended her relationship with Demos.

Shahi studied karate in her youth becoming a 1st dan black belt in Shorin-Ryu karate.

=== Lawsuit ===
In 2016, Shahi and Howey were sued by a former nanny of their children for sexual harassment and religious discrimination. The lawsuit claimed Shahi mocked her Islamic customs of dress and fasting. The lawsuit also alleged sexual harassment, with Shahi sharing a lewd photograph with the nanny, and grabbing her backside and commenting, "You have a perfect little butt." In 2017, the nanny asked for the case to be dismissed.

== Filmography ==
=== Film ===
Sarah Shahi in films
Year	Title	Role	Other notes
2000	Dr. T and the Women	Cheerleader	Uncredited
2003	Old School	Erica	
2003	Legally Blonde 2: Red, White & Blonde	Becky, Delta Nu Sister	Uncredited
2005	A Lot Like Love	Starlet	
2006	For Your Consideration	Sanchez	
2006	The Dog Problem	Candy	
2007	Rush Hour 3	Zoe	Uncredited
2008	Shades of Ray	Sana Khaliq	
2008	AmericanEast	Salwah Marzoke	
2009	Crossing Over	Pooneh Baraheri	
2011	East Fifth Bliss	Hattie Skunk / Hattie Rockworth	
2011	I Don't Know How She Does It	Janine LoPietro	
2012	Static	Adele Dade	
2012	Bullet to the Head	Lisa Bonomo	
2013	The Congress	Michelle	
2014	Road to Paloma	Eva Murphy	
2015	Divine Access	Marian	
2015	The Adventures of Beatle	Carla	
2017	Hangman	Captain Lisa Watson	
2020	Bad Therapy	Annabelle	
2020	American 11	Aliyah Ali	
2022	Black Adam	Adrianna Tomaz	
2023	Red, White & Royal Blue	Zahra Bankston	
TBA	Red, White & Royal Wedding	Zahra Bankston	Post-production

=== Television ===
Sarah Shahi in television
Year	Title	Role	Other notes
2000	City Guys	Cheerleader	Episode: "Shock Treatment"
2000	Spin City	Bachelorette	Episode: "Blind Faith"
2001	Boston Public	Laura	Episode: "Chapter Eleven"
2001	Off Centre	Angelica	Episode: "A Cute Triangle"
2001	Maybe It's Me	Rosa	Episode: "The Exchange-Student Episode"
2001	18 Wheels of Justice	Christina	Episode: "Old Wives' Tale "
2001–2002	Alias	Jenny	7 episodes
2002	Class of '06	Megan "Meg"	Unsold NBC pilot
2002	My Adventures in Television	TV Diva	Episode: "The Chinese Baby"
2003	Frasier	Reservationist	Episode: "Door Jam"
2003	Dawson's Creek	Sadia Shaw / Mystery Girl	Episodes: "Catch-22", "Sex and Violence", and "All the Right Moves"
2003	ER	Tara King	Episode: "The Greater Good"
2004	Century City	Ms. Morris	Episode: "Sweet Child of Mine"
2004, 2007	Reba	Kate; Bridget	Episode: "To Tell You the Truth"; Episode: "Cheyenne's Rival"
2005	Plan B	Bronwyn	Unsold CMT pilot
2005	Supernatural	Constance Welch / The Woman in White	Episode: "Pilot"
2005	The Drop	Herself	Episode: "2.49"
2005–2009	The L Word	Carmen de la Pica Morales	26 episodes
2006	Teachers	Tina Torres	Main role
2006	Sleeper Cell	Farrah	Episodes: "Faith" and "Torture"
2007	The Sopranos	Sonya Aragon	Episode: "Kennedy and Heidi"
2007–2009	Life	Dani Reese	Main character, 32 episodes
2010	Psych	Ruby	Episode: "Thrill Seekers and Hell Raisers"
2011–2012	Fairly Legal	Kate Reed	Lead character, 23 episodes
2011	Young Justice	Killer Frost / Crystal Frost (voice)	Episode: "Terrors"
2012–2013, 2018	Chicago Fire	Renee Royce	10 episodes
2013–2016	Person of Interest	Sameen Shaw	Recurring role (season 2); main role (seasons 3–5)
2015	Ray Donovan	Hasmig	Episode: "One Night in Yerevan"
2016	Pitch	Natalie Luongo	Episodes: "Unstoppable Forces & Immovable Objects" and "Scratched"
2016	Drew	Nancy Drew	Unsold CBS pilot
2017	Michael Bolton's Big, Sexy Valentine's Day Special	Carmela	Netflix variety special
2018	Reverie	Mara Kint	Main role, 10 episodes
2018	Halfway There	Carrie Claussen	Television film
2018	Hell's Kitchen	Herself	Blue guest diner; Episode: "Fish Out of Water"
2018–2019	The Rookie	Jessica Russo	Recurring role, 7 episodes
2019	Heartstrings	Lucy Jane	Episode: "Cracker Jack"
2019	City on a Hill	Rachel Behnam	Recurring role
2021–2023	Sex/Life	Billie Connelly	Main role
2025–present	Paradise	Dr. Gabriela Torabi	Main role

== See also ==
- List of Iranian women
