= Person of Interest season 3 =

Season of television series

Person of Interest
- Season 3
- Home media cover art
- Starring: Jim Caviezel; Taraji P. Henson; Kevin Chapman; Amy Acker; Sarah Shahi; Michael Emerson
- No. of episodes: 23

Release
- Original network: CBS
- Original release: September 24, 2013 – May 13, 2014

Season chronology
- ← Previous; Season 2 Next → Season 4

The third season of the American television series Person of Interest premiered on September 24, 2013. The season is produced by Kilter Films, Bad Robot, and Warner Bros. Television, with Jonathan Nolan, Greg Plageman, J. J. Abrams, and Bryan Burk serving as executive producers and Plageman serving as showrunner.

The series was renewed for a third season in March 2013 and stars Jim Caviezel, Taraji P. Henson, Kevin Chapman, Amy Acker, Sarah Shahi and Michael Emerson. The series revolves around a team led by a mysterious reclusive billionaire computer programmer, Harold Finch, who has developed a computer program for the federal government known as "the Machine" that is capable of collating all sources of information to predict terrorist acts and to identify people planning them. The Machine also identifies perpetrators and victims of other premeditated deadly crimes; however, because the government considers these "irrelevant", Finch programs the Machine to delete this information each night and programs the Machine to notify him secretly of the "irrelevant" numbers.

The season premiered on September 24, 2013, on CBS and ended on May 13, 2014. Viewership for the season averaged 14.05 million viewers, ranking as the 8th most watched series of the 2013–14 television season. The season received highly positive reviews from critics, its focus on artificial intelligence was singled out for praise and the surprise twists on the season also received acclaim. The season, which aired shortly after events associated with Edward Snowden, attracted more attention due to its similarities. In March 2014, CBS renewed the series for a fourth season.

== Season summary ==
The Machine's sentience is fully revealed as it increasingly communicates with and proactively assists and directs the actions of the team. After being demoted due to HR's machinations, Carter delves deeper into her investigation of the organization and eventually uncovers and arrests its leader, thus bringing down the entire organization, but she is then killed by its rogue second-in-command. In his grief over her death, Reese briefly leaves the team. The team also battles Vigilance, a violent anti-government hacktivist organization devoted to securing people's privacy.

During the second half of the third season, the existence of code to create another artificial intelligence – called Samaritan – is revealed, which has fallen into Decima's hands. Samaritan differs from the Machine in being open to external direction and willing to remove those seen as disruptive to law and order pre-emptively, and is a more advanced design, but as seen by the Machine, should never have existed as it lacks a moral code – an attribute that Samaritan sees as a flaw. In the season three finale, it is revealed that Greer, who sees Samaritan as a means to fix humanity's problems, had covertly built Vigilance as a domestic terrorist threat, and created a terrorist event of mass destruction in their name, to manipulate the authorities into ordering Samaritan's activation and providing direct access to the NSA feeds required for full operation. Unable to prevent Samaritan's activation, the Machine creates new identities for the Team while Root and Shaw modify Samaritan to always treat the new identities as unsuspicious.

== Cast and characters ==
=== Main ===
- Jim Caviezel as John Reese
- Taraji P. Henson as Detective Jocelyn "Joss" Carter
- Kevin Chapman as Detective Lionel Fusco
- Amy Acker as Samantha Groves/Root
- Sarah Shahi as Sameen Shaw
- Michael Emerson as Harold Finch

=== Recurring ===
- John Nolan as John Greer
- Leslie Odom Jr. as Peter Collier
- Robert John Burke as Officer Patrick Simmons
- Camryn Manheim as Control
- Boris McGiver as George Hersh
- John Doman as Ross Garrison
- Clarke Peters as Alonzo Quinn
- Brian Wiles as Officer Mike Laskey
- Enrico Colantoni as Carl Elias
- Al Sapienza as Detective Raymond Terney
- David Valcin as Anthony S. Marconi/Scarface
- Laz Alonso as Paul Carter
- Bruce Altman as Dr. Ronald Carmichael
- Kwoade Cross as Taylor Carter
- Michael Esper as Jason Greenfield
- Joe Mazzello as Daniel Casey
- Saul Rubinek as Arthur Claypool
- Alex Shimizu as Tatsuro Daizo
- Morgan Spector as Peter Yogorov
- Julian Ovenden as Jeremy Lambert
- Sean McCarthy as Lee Fusco
- Annie Parisse as CIA Agent Kara Stanton
- Carrie Preston as Grace Hendricks
- Jay O. Sanders as Special Counsel
- Paige Turco as Zoe Morgan

=== Notable guests ===
- Rey Valentin as Jack Salazar ("Liberty")
- Max Martini as RIP ("Liberty")
- David Alan Basche as Wayne Kruger ("Nothing to Hide")
- Warren Kole as Ian Murphy ("Lady Killer")
- Paul Ben-Victor as Detective Gary Cameron ("Reasonable Doubt")
- Daniel Cosgrove as Jeremy Watkins ("Reasonable Doubt")
- Kirk Acevedo as Timothy Sloan ("Mors Praematura")
- Aaron Staton as Hayden Price ("The Perfect Mark")
- Lee Tergesen as Detective William Petersen ("The Crossing")
- Sally Pressman as Holly ("4C")
- Samm Levine as Owen Matthews ("4C")
- Neil Jackson as Rick Dillinger ("RAM")
- Yul Vazquez as Cyrus Wells ("/")
- Colin Donnell as Billy Parsons ("/")
- Nazneen Contractor as Maria Martinez ("Allegiance")
- Haaz Sleiman as Omar Risha ("Allegiance")
- Michel Gill as Rene Lapointe ("Allegiance")
- Nestor Carbonell as Matthew Reed ("Most Likely To...")
- John Heard as Roger McCourt ("Death Benefit")

== Episodes ==
No. overall	No. in season	Title	Directed by	Written by	Original release date	Prod. code	U.S. viewers (millions)
46	1	"Liberty"	Chris Fisher	Greg Plageman & Denise Thé	September 24, 2013	2J7601	12.44
Reese, Finch, and Shaw work to save the life of a sailor named Jack Salazar (Rey Valentin) who is inadvertently caught up in a diamond smuggling operation run by a team of Force Recon Marines. Shaw gets used to being a member of the team, although her propensity for violent solutions worries Finch. Meanwhile, Carter adapts to life as a uniformed police officer after being demoted. It is revealed she is conducting a secret investigation into HR, and has identified several of its high-ranking members. A troubled Root continues to receive counseling, and later reveals that she is still in contact with the Machine when she uses it to learn the unhealthy habits of her psychiatrist, Dr. Carmichael (Bruce Altman).
47	2	"Nothing to Hide"	Frederick E. O. Toye	Erik Mountain	October 1, 2013	2J7602	12.35
Wayne Kruger (David Alan Basche) is the owner of a company known as Lifetrace, which specializes in revealing members' privacy on their profile pages and selling it to various organizations. Reese, Finch, and Shaw monitor Kruger's activities in the company, which is currently making a deal with another large retail company called Riverton. Though the site is deemed harmless by Kruger, Finch discovers that there is a class-action suit against Kruger involving various victims of the site whose privacy has been eliminated. Members of the suit receive anonymous packages containing information on how to humiliate and attack Kruger in revenge for their lives being destroyed thanks to Lifetrace. One of these people is Stu Sommers, a man whose daughter was stalked and killed by her ex-boyfriend after he used Lifetrace to follow her. Reese convinces Sommers not to kill Kruger before being shot at by Collier, a man supposedly working for Riverton. Collier also kills Kruger before fleeing the scene. He was the one who sent the anonymous packages.
48	3	"Lady Killer"	Omar Madha	Amanda Segel	October 8, 2013	2J7603	11.65
When the Machine gives the number of Ian Murphy (Warren Kole), a man suspected of being a stalker, Reese along with Shaw recruits Carter, Fusco and Zoe to investigate further into his background. But when they discover that Murphy has a son from a former lover who is now dead, they work to reunite the boy with his father and right the wrong set in motion by the boy's grandfather, who wanted Murphy dead after he did not approve of him and saw him at his daughter's funeral. Meanwhile, Root sets her escape plan in motion with the help of the Machine when government operative Hersh tracks her down. Finch arrives at the hospital and finds to his horror the hospital staff incapacitated and Root gone.
49	4	"Reasonable Doubt"	Stephen Williams	Melissa Scrivner Love	October 15, 2013	2J7604	12.69
Reese and Finch's next number is that of Vanessa Watkins (Kathleen Rose Perkins), a prominent New York prosecutor who is accused of killing her defense attorney husband, Jeremy. The police find a gun with her DNA on it and arrest her. Vanessa escapes police custody. Finch investigates Jeremy's murder and learns that he owed money to a gangster. Reese, Finch and Carter question Watkins to decide if she is guilty or innocent. Her testimony eventually convinces them that Vanessa is innocent, but they also discover that Jeremy, who turns out to be alive, has emptied his bank accounts. They then conclude that Jeremy framed her and Reese drops Vanessa at a bus station to flee as Jeremy may try to kill her. But the team discovers that Vanessa lied in the testimony, had a fake passport for herself and did not leave town, intending to kill Jeremy. On his yacht, Jeremy is held at gunpoint by Vanessa. Reese arrives, leaves his gun next to Jeremy and leaves. Reese then has Finch call the authorities as gunshots are heard from the yacht, not revealing who survived or died.
50	5	"Razgovor" "Разговор"	Kenneth Fink	David Slack	October 22, 2013	2J7605	13.17
In a series of flashbacks to Shaw's childhood it is revealed she was in a car with her father when he was killed in a wreck, but that she showed a lack of emotion over it. In the present, Shaw saves another number. The team's next number turns out to be a Russian immigrant girl named Genrika Zhirova (Danielle Kotch), who is deeply interested in espionage and is living with an older cousin in a run-down apartment. Shaw ends up watching Genrika when men come to attack her. Genrika had been bugging the phones in her apartment building and overheard information she should not have. Meanwhile, Carter is continuing her investigation of HR. She is eventually asked to meet her partner Laskey at a bar, where he confronts her about her work with Reese. Knowing that Laskey is corrupt, she blackmails him into working for her. Root later arrives at Shaw's loft and abducts her.
51	6	"Mors Praematura"	Helen Shaver	Dan Dietz	October 29, 2013	2J7606	12.00
While Shaw is abducted by Root, Finch and Reese get the number of Timothy Sloan (Kirk Acevedo), an estate investigator. Finch goes undercover as Sloan's assistant while Reese continues investigating Shaw's whereabouts. Sloan investigates the case of his foster brother, a man named Jason Greenfield (Michael Esper), who apparently died of a heroin overdose. Finch soon learns that Greenfield used to be a member of the organization Vigilance, which includes Peter Collier (Leslie Odom, Jr.) (from the episode "Nothing to Hide"). Meanwhile, Shaw reluctantly agrees to help Root get into a CIA black site. Jason, who is alive, is one of the people held there, awaiting transfer. The transfer is intercepted by Vigilance, leading to a shootout. Root helps Jason escape and tells him to go to a location in South America. Reese and Shaw eventually save Sloan and recapture Root, but Collier gets away. Finch locks up Root in the Library.
52	7	"The Perfect Mark"	Stephen Surjik	Sean Hennen	November 5, 2013	2J7607	11.79
Reese and Finch get the number of Hayden Price (Aaron Staton), a hypnotherapist. Finch, who poses as Hayden's patient, learns that Hayden is a con man who hypnotizes his patients into giving him their security information, which allows him to enter their bank accounts and steal from them. One of his patients, Sven Vanger (Carsten Norgaard), is in fact a money launderer for HR who bids fake items at auctions. One of the items he purchased is a baseball signed by the 1922 New York Yankees team, which is worth $4,000,000. Sven sells it for $5, believing it to be a fake. That night, Laskey shows Carter the pictures he has taken of Simmons' activities, when Terney comes in with his gun drawn. Terney shoots Laskey dead, and Carter responds by shooting Terney almost immediately after. She begs a dying Terney to tell her if the head of HR is in one of Laskey's pictures, and Terney places his bloodstained finger on the picture of Alonzo Quinn.
53	8	"Endgame"	Sylvain White	Nic Van Zeebroeck & Michael Sopczynski	November 12, 2013	2J7608	12.60
Finch receives 38 numbers, all members of HR. Carter intercepts a drug delivery of the Russian mob, causing leader Peter Yogorov to suspect HR. Carter starts a war between HR and the Russians by firing sniper shots at HR leader Alonzo Quinn, who blames the Russians. Quinn orders his right-hand man, Simmons, to have his men round up the Russians. Reese learns about Carter's plan, and Finch deduces Quinn's identity as the head of HR. The Russians' numbers come up as they are now threatened by HR, but both groups are arrested by the FBI when Carter tips them off. Carter takes Yogorov into protective custody and has him sign a statement that can earn an arrest warrant for Quinn, but the judge she approaches is member of HR. Quinn, Simmons, and two other HR cops wait for Carter at the judge's house, where Carter reveals that she called Reese and Finch, recording HR's incriminating conversation. Reese breaks in, a shootout ensues, and Carter apprehends Quinn. Simmons later accesses a dashcam that has a picture of Reese.
54	9	"The Crossing"	Frederick E. O. Toye	Denise Thé	November 19, 2013	2J7609	12.28
Reese and Carter are crossing town to deliver Alonzo Quinn to the FBI. Simmons alerts HR and several criminal groups of Reese's identity, limiting their means of movement. The two fight their way to, and break into, the city morgue. Simmons and Detective William Petersen (Lee Tergesen) capture and torture Fusco for the location of Carter's safe deposit box, which contains evidence against HR. To break Fusco, Simmons sends Lin (Khalil Kain) to kill his son Lee (Sean McCarthy); but Lin is killed by Shaw. Fusco breaks his own thumb to get free of the handcuffs, and kills Petersen. Reese distracts the HR cops by killing or disabling all but one, leading him onto the street. Finch arranges for two honest policemen to arrest Reese to evade HR. Carter and Quinn reach FBI Headquarters. Quinn is charged with multiple offenses and HR gets disbanded, with the exception of a few rogue officers, including the now-fugitive Simmons. Carter, re-promoted to detective, releases Reese from police custody. Simmons fires on both Reese and Carter down the street. Carter shoots Simmons back, but he escapes, merely wounded. Severely injured, Reese holds a dying Carter in his arms as she loses consciousness.
55	10	"The Devil's Share"	Chris Fisher	Amanda Segel & Jonathan Nolan	November 26, 2013	2J7610	11.89
Flashbacks illuminate Finch's dealing with survivor's guilt, Reese's time doing wetwork, Shaw's former life as a technically excellent surgeon but completely indifferent to the people she helped, and Fusco's recounting of exacting vigilante justice to a crook that slipped through the system (the devil's share). Reese starts sliding into his old, dark ways to get Simmons while also sliding towards death. Finch, Fusco, and Shaw go to an HR attorney to know Quinn's whereabouts to question him for Simmons' plan, but the Russians have killed him, shortly after Reese got the information. The team turns to Root in desperation. Reese gets Simmons' location and is just about to kill Quinn when Finch reminds him that killing Quinn now would destroy Carter's legacy of bringing him down legally, and he collapses. Fusco finds the note that Reese dropped, and goes after Simmons. After a brutal fistfight, Fusco emotionally refuses to kill Simmons and takes him into custody, citing Carter's influence for turning his life around. Root, despite having opportunity to flee, returns to her cell, and Finch thanks her for helping him in saving Reese. Finally, Elias watches as Marconi murders Simmons in his hospital bed in retaliation for Carter.
56	11	"Lethe"	Richard J. Lewis	Erik Mountain	December 17, 2013	2J7611	12.40
Reese leaves the team and heads for Colorado, where his father had lived. The Machine provides a new number to Harold, who at first is reluctant, but eventually accepts it on Root's insistence. The number belongs to Arthur Claypool (Saul Rubinek), Harold's close friend during his days at MIT. Claypool has been diagnosed with a brain tumor and is being monitored at the hospital, being kept under Secret Service guard. Arthur's wife, Diane (Camryn Manheim) tells the disguised Doctor Shaw that Arthur works for the NSA, and Collier's group Vigilance tries to abduct him. They escape to a hotel, where Harold talks to Arthur to get more information about Samaritan: a project which sought to build an AI, like the later Machine, but was shut down just as it achieved consciousness. As Arthur talks with Finch, he remembers that his wife is dead, prompting the woman pretending to be Diane to reveal herself as Control. She threatens to kill either Arthur or Harold unless one of them gives up their respective AI. The Machine starts analyzing threats to its assets and itself, changing Samaritan's status from "Deactivated" to "Unknown".
57	12	"Aletheia"	Richard J. Lewis	Lucas O'Connor	January 7, 2014	2J7612	12.10
Control holds Harold, Shaw and Arthur captive. She orders Shaw killed, but Root enters, guns blazing, and frees the trio. Root herself is shot and captured by Control, who tortures her, demanding access to the Machine. Control destroys the hearing in Root's right ear and threatens to make her completely deaf and blind. Meanwhile, Arthur reveals that he has a copy of the Samaritan AI in a safe-deposit box. They go to retrieve it, and Vigilance militants attack the bank. Harold locks himself, Arthur, and the bank manager in the vault. While Shaw readies a bomb to break out of the vault, Harold tells Arthur about the Machine and convinces him to destroy Samaritan to keep it from falling into the wrong hands. Vigilance breaks into the vault and captures everyone, including Shaw, but Reese and Lionel save them. Meanwhile, the Machine helps Root to escape from Control. Root calls Harold to tell him that the Samaritan drives were not destroyed: The bank manager was an imposter who swapped the disks with replicas. The impostor is shown handing the drives to Decima Technologies head Greer, who shoots her to cover his tracks. He has great plans for Samaritan.
58	13	"4C"	Stephen Williams	Melissa Scrivner Love & Greg Plageman	January 14, 2014	2J7613	12.54
Reese boards an international flight to get away from his former life, but the Machine makes changes to his itinerary causing him to take another one. Initially Reese is angry at Harold thinking he has made the changes, but Harold convinces him otherwise. It turns out that Owen Matthews (Samm Levine), a passenger on the plane is a witness being escorted by U.S. Marshals, and he is the intended target of multiple assassins including the ISA. After Reese foils several assassination attempts, Finch learns that one of the assassins plans to crash the aircraft and kill everyone onboard just to ensure the witness is eliminated. Reese and Harold safely land the plane and save everyone, and all ends well. Reese goes on a date with Holly (Sally Pressman), the flight attendant who helped him and later tells Harold he wants a new suit and to come back and work again.
59	14	"Provenance"	Jeffrey Hunt	Sean Hennen	February 4, 2014	2J7614	12.35
The team's next case is that of Kelli Lin (Elaine Tan), a former silver medal-winning Olympic gymnast who is later revealed to be an antiquities thief long pursued by Interpol. Shaw investigates Kelli's house, learning that her next operation is to steal a Gutenberg Bible that is being shipped out that night. Shaw foils the plan but is confronted by Kelli, whose boss Cyril (Gene Farber) is an extortionist revealed to be forcing Kelli to commit robberies while her daughter is held captive. Finch takes Interpol agent Alain Bouchard (Henri Lubatti), the man in charge of the investigation against Kelli, to listen in on Kelli's conversation with Cyril so Bouchard can learn the truth. Cyril refuses to free Kelli's daughter, but sees Reese take down the thugs guarding her on the surveillance feed. Shaw stops Cyril from killing Kelli and both Kelli and Cyril are apprehended. In an interrogation room at the NYPD, Bouchard places a key on a desk, allowing her to leave. The next day, Kelli and her daughter happily reunite. That night, the team celebrates their victory and Reese honors Carter by pouring a glass for their "missing member".
60	15	"Last Call"	Jeff T. Thomas	Dan Dietz	February 25, 2014	2J7615	11.00
When the number of Sandra (Melissa Sagemiller), a 911 operator, comes up, Harold goes undercover at the 911 call-center. Later, a child is kidnapped and the call is routed specifically to Sandra. She is ordered to delete an earlier day's 911 call logs, in return for the child's life. Meanwhile, the case overlaps with one of the murder cases with which Fusco was helping a rookie detective. It turns out that a woman was killed by her married ex-boyfriend and boss, and the family hired a cleaner to erase the final 911 call she made. When Fusco 'convinces' the family to terminate the contract, the cleaner decides to kill both the child and Sandra. Reese and Shaw save the child from kidnappers and a bomb, while Harold traps the assassin who comes after Sandra. The team is never able to find the real cleaner, who later calls Finch to threaten him. The criminal becomes known as "The Voice".
61	16	"RAM"	Stephen Surjik	Nic Van Zeebroeck & Michael Sopczynski	March 4, 2014	2J7616	10.64
In 2010, Harold works with Dillinger (Neil Jackson), an ex-Blackwater mercenary who performs the same duties later performed by Reese. Their current number is Daniel Casey (Joseph Mazzello), a hacker who tests computer security systems. Multiple parties attempt to eliminate Casey, including Reese and Stanton (secretly arranged by Control) and agents of Decima Technologies. Dillinger saves Casey and brings him to Harold, who realizes Casey's last job was to find a way to access the Machine. Although Casey failed, he learned enough to warrant Control to want him dead and his laptop destroyed. Dillinger turns on Finch and steals the laptop from him to sell on the black market, but not before Finch modifies the laptop's code. The sale is busted by a Special Counsel agent (Shaw) who kills Dillinger, but one of the buyers escapes with the laptop. Casey is captured by Reese, who decides to let him live against his orders, providing him with safe passage to Canada, an act of mercy that Harold observes unseen. Control traces the laptop to China, and orders that Reese and Stanton to be sent after the laptop and destroyed along with it. In the present day, Root finds Casey in Alaska and tells him to go to Cartagena, Colombia and seek out Jason Greenfield. (Note: Her number from "Mors Praematura".)
62	17	"/" "Root Path"	Jeffrey Lee Gibson	David Slack	March 18, 2014	2J7617	10.94
The Machine orders Root on several tasks such as helping a convict escape and using him to impersonate a Department of Defense employee in order to obtain a secret note. Afterward, she and Harold's team coincidentally reach the same person, a janitor. It later turns out that NSA has been testing an advanced supercomputing chip and the janitor was one of the 15 people who had access to the development lab. This makes both Decima and Vigilance come after him. While Harold and his team's assignment was to protect the janitor, Root had to stop the chip from falling into Decima's hands. They are able to save the janitor, but Decima gets the chip.
63	18	"Allegiance"	Jeffrey Hunt	Tony Camerino	March 25, 2014	2J7618	12.23
The team receives the number of Maria Martinez (Nazneen Contractor), an engineer working for the international energy company HydralCorp. Maria is working to clear the name of Omar Risha (Haaz Sleiman), a man from Iraq suspected of being a terrorist. Shaw, Fusco and Reese save Maria from an assassination attempt and learn that Omar was her translator in Iraq and saved her from a terrorist ambush during the shipment of six generators. The generators went missing and Omar learned about their disappearance, being targeted for it. Finch learns that the generators were shipped elsewhere and that HydralCorp's corrupt CEO Ken Davis (Casey Biggs) is responsible. Maria and Shaw discover that Davis has created a false report of Omar's terrorist accusations, and that French United Nations diplomat Rene Lapointe (Michel Gill) has the papers approving Omar's asylum in the US in his office. Reese, Fusco and Omar break into the UN building and stop Greek diplomat Christos Sevon (William Abadie) from killing Maria. Root takes Bear to spy on Decima head Greer, where it is revealed that Davis had the generators shipped to the US so Greer can power Samaritan. Greer has Davis killed and leaves, and Root follows him.
64	19	"Most Likely To..."	Kevin Hooks	Melissa Scrivner Love & Denise Thé	April 1, 2014	2J7619	11.45
The team witness Leona Wainwright being killed by a suicide bomber. She worked for the government, managing security clearances; Finch deduces from cell phone information that Vigilance killed her. Their next number, prosecutor Matthew Reed (Nestor Carbonell), sends Reese and Shaw to a high school reunion in Westchester. They manage to prevent a planned murder, while fending off an ambush by Vigilance. Meanwhile, Finch and Fusco go to Washington, D.C. to find out why Leona was targeted, but Vigilance beats them to it. Collier obtains classified documents about the Machine and disseminates them world wide. Senator Ross Garrison (John Doman) publicly denies the existence of the Machine and orders Control to shut it down. She gives the command, and shreds Collier's eyes-only file. With its Primary Operations compromised, the Machine restructures, transferring massive amounts of red-flagged data to Tertiary Operations: Root.
65	20	"Death Benefit"	Richard J. Lewis	Erik Mountain & Lucas O'Connor	April 15, 2014	2J7620	10.74
The new number is Congressman Roger McCourt (John Heard), who serves on the powerful Rules Committee. The team is initially baffled: He has no obvious enemies. They eventually discover a connection to Decima: McCourt admits to agreeing to help Decima with favorable legislation (granting Decima access to government surveillance feeds), in exchange for insider stock-trading tips. Reese concludes that the team is the “danger”, because the Machine wants them to kill McCourt in order to prevent future killings by Decima. Harold is deeply disturbed at this idea, and he leaves the team, not wishing to participate in an assassination. In the end, McCourt is left alive and proceeds with Decima's plan. Greer also approaches a skeptical Senator Garrison, offering him a 24-hour beta test of their machine. Garrison agrees, and Greer immediately deploys Samaritan to track down Finch. Meanwhile, Root is travelling across the country, dealing with various relevant threats.
66	21	"Beta"	Frederick E. O. Toye	Sean Hennen & Dan Dietz	April 29, 2014	2J7621	11.31
With Finch having disappeared, Decima initiates their plan with Samaritan, and when unable to find Finch, they look for his closest connection and the number received is that of Finch's fiancee Grace. The Machine also provides Grace's number as a result, and Reese, Shaw and Root work to protect her while evading Decima, who use Samaritan to spy on them within the range of New York. Grace is eventually kidnapped and interviewed by Greer, who reveals his extensive knowledge of her and begins asking about her life with Finch. When he implies that Finch lied to her, Grace snaps and firmly tells Greer that Finch would never lie as Grace gave him her unbreakable trust. When the team manages to locate Decima's current HQ, Greer takes Grace and tells Reese and Shaw that they can get Grace back in exchange for giving them Finch. Finch agrees to the deal, and at Jefferson Bridge, Grace is blindfolded and brought to Reese and crew while Finch is taken by Decima. Reese later gives Grace an envelope, saying that she has been accepted for a job in Italy. Greer, meanwhile, finally meets Finch in person and sits down with him to talk.
67	22	"A House Divided"	Chris Fisher	Amanda Segel	May 6, 2014	2J7622	10.50
In a series of flashbacks to 2010, the narrative reveals the backstory on Collier, the face of Vigilance. His brother had been falsely accused of terrorist activities, held without trial, and had committed suicide as a result. The Machine's latest numbers include Control, Senator Garrison, a presidential assistant, and a seemingly unconcerned Greer. Vigilance kidnaps them, along with Finch, and the episode ends with Vigilance about to conduct a private trial of their detainees, while Reese and Shaw, along with Hersh (joining forces after a tense confrontation) watch from a closed-circuit TV screen set up for their benefit. Meanwhile, Root has discovered the location of the Samaritan system.
68	23	"Deus Ex Machina"	Chris Fisher	Greg Plageman & David Slack	May 13, 2014	2J7623	10.95
The trial continues. Reese, Hersh and Fusco search for the courtroom. Shaw helps Root smuggle seven servers into the Samaritan array. Hersh finds a bomb, wired to go off when the power comes on. Control is found guilty. To save her life, Finch confesses to building the Machine. When a command post is compromised, Collier moves the trial to the roof, where Decima attacks. Greer reveals that he himself created Vigilance. He wanted an atrocity—the bomb—to justify Samaritan. The bomb explodes, Greer's lieutenant kills Collier, and Reese rescues Harold. Because of Samaritan, Vigilance members are identified, targeted and eliminated, but Harold's team is identified as “irrelevant” by the program. Finch, Reese, Shaw, Root and the programmers have new identities. The seven servers hard-wire Samaritan to ignore them. Samaritan asks for instructions. Greer replies, “What, my dear Samaritan, are your commands for us?” The answer: “Calculating response... ".

== Production ==
=== Development ===
The series was renewed for a third season in March 2013. Jonathan Nolan stated that he viewed the season as two halves: the first half focusing on Carter's journey and the second half focusing more on the Machine storyline. Nolan commented on the 22-episode season order, "It's very difficult. The number of episodes is probably calibrated not to the length of the season but to the exact point a showrunner will have a nervous breakdown."

=== Writing ===
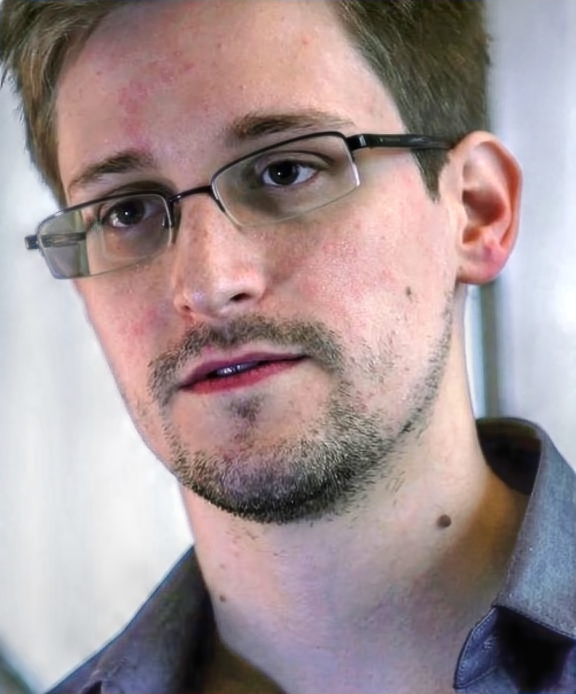
During the season, many critics and analysts noticed parallelisms between the series' premise and Edward Snowden.

Greg Plageman said that the Machine's location is not the central theme of the season, but what its intentions are, "What is it up to? What sort of organism is it becoming? And is it expanding beyond the parameters of what even Finch designed?"

Amy Acker teased her role in the season, "The Machine and Root have a very special connection — at least in her mind. So it's either perpetuating her fantasies by calling her or something else." She also addressed more scenes with Shaw, saying, "She's so great, I would love to torture her again any day." Plageman added that the season would explore mostly Carter and Shaw's pasts. On Shaw's role, Plageman deemed her part of the "Groucho Marx School", explaining that she would not work for anyone following her government's betrayal but she would help the team "when she feels like it." Sarah Shahi commented on her character's past on "Razgovor", "as we were shooting it, I felt like it was a complete and total disaster and I had no idea how it was going to turn out. But then after watching it I was very pleased with it."

Many analysts noticed similarities between the season's airing and Edward Snowden, whose actions drew parallelisms to the series' premise, particularly to an episode in the first season, "No Good Deed". Nolan commented, "Occasionally, we've been accused of writing a show that's sort of an apologia for the surveillance state. I totally reject that. If there's a cynicism to the show, it's in the premise not just that this is inevitable but that it's already happened. The science-fiction part of the show is that the Machine is accurate, but the invasion of civil liberties is not imaginary. If the legacy of the Second World War was the atomic age, then what might emerge from the war on terror would be artificial intelligence." Plageman said, "What's interesting about the revelations coming from Snowden is that there are other characters, other figures — some who work for the FBI or the NSA — who indicated years ago that this was something that was going on. Certainly Shane Harris outlined all this in his book The Watchers, going back as far as Admiral Poindexter, so what we'd like to do this year is inform people how long this has actually been going on, through drama and through fiction, but in a way that is actually quite real." Actor Kevin Chapman said, "Look at the NSA — they're making us look like a reality show! We've been talking about that for three seasons, and it's now just coming to light."

=== Casting ===
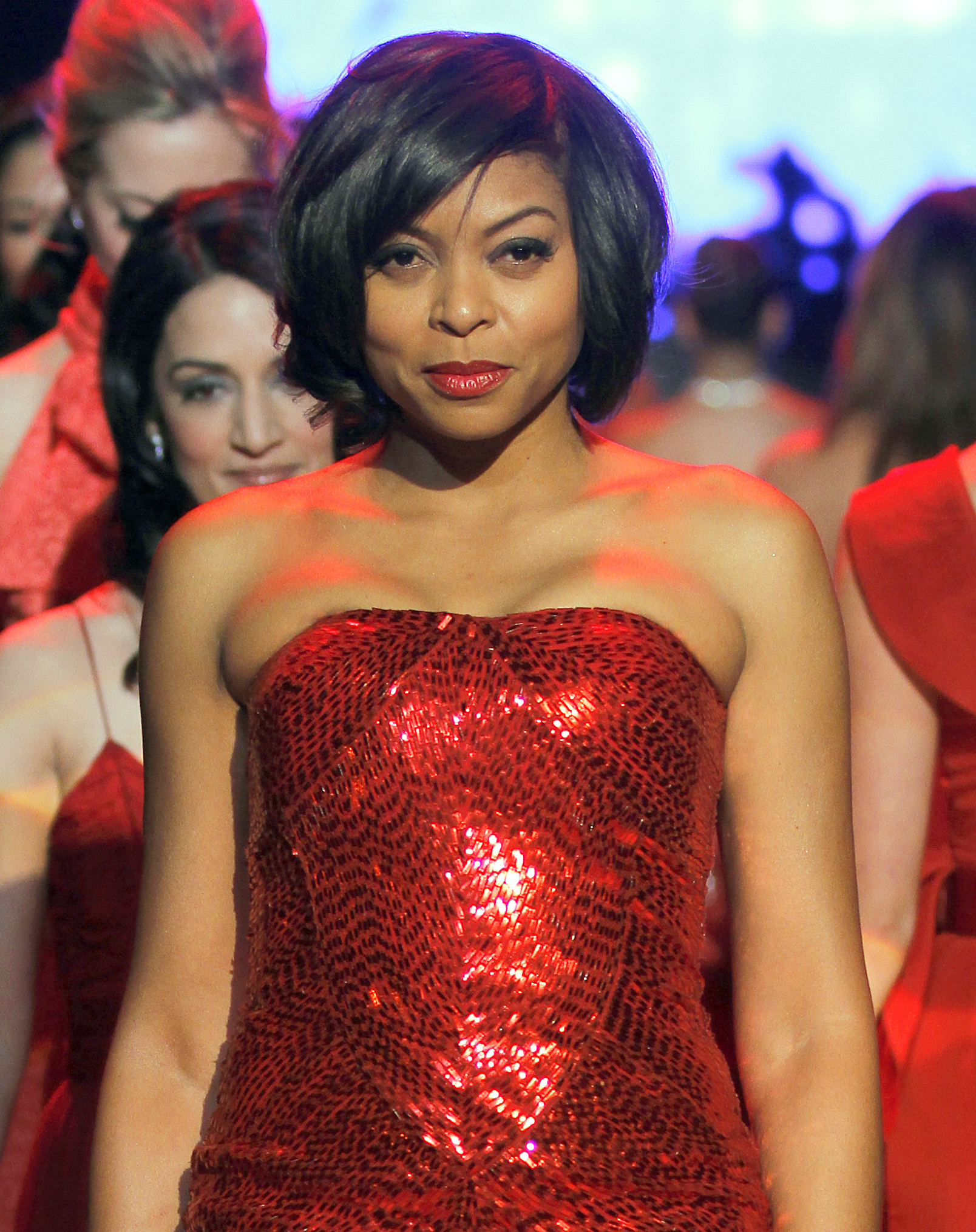
This was the last season with Taraji P. Henson as series regular due to her character's death. She would return for a guest performance in the fourth season.

A few days after the second season ended, it was announced that Sarah Shahi, who played Sameen Shaw, would be upgraded to series regular starting with this season. In July 2013, it was reported that Amy Acker was also upgraded to series regular for the season. Nolan commented on the decision to upgrade both stars, "when you add a few new characters, that actually winds up adding five or six new relationships. It gives us that much more of a challenge, which is great fun."

The season brought back many actors from the series, including Paige Turco as Zoe Morgan, who reprised her role on "Lady Killer".

"The Crossing" features the death of Joss Carter, played by Taraji P. Henson. During rumors of a main character death, recurring cast member Carrie Preston teased the death, "It's going to be sad for everybody — not just the fans but also the cast. But I think the way [the show] is handling it is quite remarkable." Nolan told Henson about her death at the beginning of 2013, indicating, "It was a bittersweet conversation, because we love working with her and vice versa. It's been a great creative collaboration. As sad as we were to see her go, I think we were all excited [Taraji, us and the writers] to get into a juicy piece of material, to tell a tragedy." He went on to explain the decision, "For this story [HR, police corruption] it was a natural boiling point that would put her first and foremost into focus. And frankly, as writers, we've long said that Carter was the heart of the show, and your perverse impulse as a writer is to do as much damage to the audience as possible. There's nothing more dastardly than — if Carter's the heart of the show — breaking that heart for the audience in the middle of the season." Executive producer Greg Plageman also commented on the decision, "What felt natural to us was with HR being with us from the pilot, their diabolical no-goodness, it felt like they had it in for Carter... it got to a point where you think if this person is going to hold her head up and walk into a precinct ever again she's going to have to take them on and in the conversations she had with her son, it was kind of understood what she had to do and it felt like the time was right." The kiss scene between Reese and Carter was unscripted, with Nolan commenting, "It was just a swapping scars moment. So when the actors went there, it was all of their own volition, because in that moment they both felt it. And when you removed that element, the scene didn't feel quite the same."

Among the many guest stars in the season include Warren Kole as Ian Murphy, "a POI whom Detective Carter, Agent Shaw and Zoe Morgan each try to catch the eye of — by any dressed-to-kill means necessary." For the first episode, Rey Valentin was cast as Jack Salazar, "a sailor on shore leave — during Fleet Week in New York City." The fourth episode guest starred Kathleen Rose Perkins as Vanessa Watkins, "a former ADA who is captured by the police for murdering her defense attorney ex-husband." In November 2013, Saul Rubinek joined for a two-episode guest performance as Arthur Claypool, a character only described as "slowly losing his mind."

In July 2013, Leslie Odom Jr. joined the series in a recurring role as Peter Collier, "an educated, even-tempered tech executive. Highly analytical, he plays his cards close to the vest." In November 2013, Camryn Manheim joined the series as Diane, Arthur Claypool's wife. She debuted on "Lethe", where her character was revealed to be Control. The character was teased on "God Mode", where she was played unseen by an uncredited actress.

== Release ==
=== Broadcast ===
In May 2013, CBS announced that the series would move from its Thursday time slot to Tuesdays at 10 p.m. Many deemed the move favorable for the series, as CBS wanted to create a second comedy block on Thursday night and considered that pairing the series with NCIS and NCIS: Los Angeles would work on its favor. In June 2013, CBS announced that the season would premiere on September 24, 2013. The season ended on May 13, 2014.

=== Marketing ===
On July 20, 2013, the cast and crew attended the 2013 San Diego Comic-Con to discuss and promote the season and show a sneak peek. The panel, which revealed that Amy Acker was upgraded to series regular, also included a short reel which included Finch commenting on the PRISM disclosure. In October 2013, the cast attended the 2013 Paley Fest and New York Comic Con for a Q&A session and show a sneak peek of an upcoming episode.

As part of a stunt for the November sweeps, CBS promoted "Endgame", "The Crossing" and "The Devil's Share" as part of a "three-episode event", which was deemed as pivotal and would change the direction of the series. Nolan and Plageman teased the episodes, "We promised our actors and our audience that these characters wouldn't be static, stuck in an endless loop — that they would have a journey. And, of course, every journey comes to an end."

=== Home media release ===
The third season was released on Blu-ray and DVD in region 1 on September 2, 2014, in region 2 on September 21, 2015, and in region 4 on October 8, 2014.

In 2014, Warner Bros. Television Studios announced that it sold the off-network SVOD of the series to Netflix. On September 1, 2015, the season became available to stream on Netflix. On September 22, 2020, the series left the service and was added to HBO Max on January 23, 2021.

== Reception ==
=== Viewers ===
Viewership and ratings per episode of Person of Interest season 3
No.	Title	Air date	Rating/share (18–49)	Viewers (millions)	DVR (18–49)	DVR viewers (millions)	Total (18–49)	Total viewers (millions)
1	"Liberty"	September 24, 2013	2.3/6	12.44	1.0	4.32	3.3	16.76
2	"Nothing to Hide"	October 1, 2013	2.1/6	12.35	0.9	4.08	3.0	16.43
3	"Lady Killer"	October 8, 2013	2.0/6	11.65	1.1	4.39	3.1	16.04
4	"Reasonable Doubt"	October 15, 2013	2.2/6	12.69	1.1	4.29	3.3	16.98
5	"Razgovor"	October 22, 2013	2.2/6	13.17	1.1	4.16	3.3	17.33
6	"Mors Praematura"	October 29, 2013	1.9/5	12.00	1.0	4.24	2.9	16.24
7	"The Perfect Mark"	November 5, 2013	1.9/6	11.79	1.1	4.32	3.0	16.11
8	"Endgame"	November 12, 2013	2.0/6	12.60	1.1	4.49	3.1	17.09
9	"The Crossing"	November 19, 2013	2.0/6	12.28	1.2	4.77	3.2	17.05
10	"The Devil's Share"	November 26, 2013	2.2/6	11.89	1.2	5.27	3.4	17.16
11	"Lethe"	December 17, 2013	2.0/6	12.40	1.0	4.28	3.0	16.68
12	"Aletheia"	January 7, 2014	2.0/6	12.10	1.0	4.52	3.0	16.62
13	"4C"	January 14, 2014	2.0/6	12.54	1.2	4.81	3.2	17.35
14	"Provenance"	February 4, 2014	2.1/6	12.35	1.1	4.80	3.2	17.15
15	"Last Call"	February 25, 2014	1.8/5	11.00	1.1	4.75	2.9	15.75
16	"RAM"	March 4, 2014	1.7/5	10.64	1.0	4.68	2.7	15.32
17	"/"	March 18, 2014	1.7/5	10.94	1.1	4.36	2.8	15.30
18	"Allegiance"	March 25, 2014	2.0/6	12.23	1.2	4.41	3.2	16.64
19	"Most Likely To..."	April 1, 2014	1.9/6	11.45	0.9	3.97	2.8	15.42
20	"Death Benefit"	April 15, 2014	1.8/5	10.74	1.0	4.38	2.8	15.12
21	"Beta"	April 29, 2014	1.9/6	11.31	0.9	3.82	2.8	15.13
22	"A House Divided"	May 6, 2014	1.7/5	10.50	1.0	3.98	2.7	14.48
23	"Deus Ex Machina"	May 13, 2014	1.9/6	10.95	0.9	3.68	2.8	14.63

=== Critical reception ===
The third season received highly positive reviews, and is noteworthy for drawing in more critics for its exploration of artificial intelligence, as well as its timely storytelling format. On Rotten Tomatoes, the season has an approval rating of 100% and average rating of 7.7 out of 10 based on 11 reviews. The site's critical consensus is, "Person of Interest weaves compelling standalone stories into its engrossing serial narrative, and incorporates welcome bursts of humor into its sci-fi mystery core."

In regards to the season, Slant Magazine said that the show "is at its best when sticking to cutting-edge topics" and called it a "solid action-thriller that intersperses twist-filled standalone episodes into its season-long arcs." The A.V. Club said that the show captures the "national post-post-9/11 mood" and that with the mid-season arc in season three, "turns conspiracy theory into art".

The season's two story arcs both received a considerable amount of praise: the two episodes ending the HR storyline are commonly considered to be some of the best episodes of Person of Interest. Matt Fowler of IGN gave "The Crossing" a 10 out of 10, reacting extremely positively to the cliffhanger at the ending. The episode to follow, "The Devil's Share", was the most acclaimed episode of the season, being praised for its opening sequence, its writing, Chris Fisher's direction, and the acting performances, especially those by Jim Caviezel and Kevin Chapman. Surette called the episode a "stunner" and declared it as the series' possible best episode, praising the opening sequence as the "greatest sequence the series ever put together", feeling it succeeded in eclipsing the devastation induced by Carter's death. Surette also praised Fusco's effectiveness and character development in the episode, as well naming the cinematography and direction to be the best of the series, and identifying points of symbolism in the episode he felt were noteworthy and effective. Fowler gave the episode an "amazing" rating of a 9.3 out of 10, also praising the opening sequence, as well as the flashbacks and the ending scene. Phil Dyess-Nugent of The A.V. Club gave the episode a perfect A rating, praising the atmosphere of grief the episode built and feeling Fusco's character development served as an appropriate tribute to Carter. Sean McKenna of TV Fanatic called the opening sequence "brilliant", while Courtney Vaudreuil of TV Equals praised the ending.
