= Razgovor =

- Person of Interest episode
- Episode no.: Season 3 Episode 5
- Directed by: Kenneth Fink
- Written by: David Slack
- Cinematography by: Manuel Billeter
- Editing by: Mark Conte
- Production code: 2J7605
- Original air date: October 22, 2013
- Running time: 44 minutes

Guest appearances
- Danielle Kotch as Genrika Zhirova; Morgan Spector as Peter Yogorov; Brian Wiles as Officer Mike Laskey; Al Sapienza as Detective Raymond Terney; Patrick Murney as Tremors; Stephen Tyrone Williams as Joseph Kent; Joseph Parks as Vadim Loginov; Robert John Burke as Officer Patrick Simmons

Episode chronology
← Previous "Reasonable Doubt"	Next → "Mors Praematura"

"'Razgovor" (Russian: "Разговор", IPA: [rəzɡɐˈvor]; "Conversation") is the 5th episode of the third season of the American television drama series Person of Interest. It is the 50th overall episode of the series and is written by co-executive producer David Slack and directed by Kenneth Fink. It aired on CBS in the United States and on CTV in Canada on October 22, 2013.

The series revolves around a computer program for the federal government known as "the Machine" that is capable of collating all sources of information to predict terrorist acts and to identify people planning them. A team, consisting of John Reese, Harold Finch and Sameen Shaw follow "irrelevant" crimes: lesser level of priority for the government. In the episode, the team receives the number of a young girl who may be involved in a Russian drug traffic case. Flashbacks delve more into Shaw's childhood and distant persona. Despite being credited, Kevin Chapman does not appear.

According to Nielsen Media Research, the episode was seen by an estimated 13.17 million household viewers and gained a 2.2/6 ratings share among adults aged 18–49. The episode received near critical acclaim, with critics praising Sarah Shahi's performance, character development and ending.

== Plot ==
=== Flashbacks ===
In 1993, paramedics arrive at a car crash where the driver has died. One of the paramedics saves the driver's young daughter, a young Shaw. Shaw asks for her father but the paramedic states that he died. Shaw shows a lack of emotion over the news, just asking for a sandwich. This worries the paramedics, who question if there is something wrong with her.

=== Present day ===
Carter (Taraji P. Henson) watches a meeting between HR members, including Terney (Al Sapienza), Simmons (Robert John Burke) and Yogorov (Morgan Spector). She then meets with Reese (Jim Caviezel), telling him she has enough evidence to take down part of HR although she wants to bring the whole organization down.

Finch (Michael Emerson) receives a new number but surprisingly, it does not match with a social security number, but with a USCIS Green card number. The number belongs to a Russian woman named Genrika Zhirova (Danielle Kotch), with no recorded fingerprints or photos. When Shaw (Sarah Shahi) visits her address, she finds that Genrika is a young girl living with her drug-addicted third cousin. While following her, Reese and Shaw save Genrika from a kidnapping attempt and take her to her building.

While Reese inspects the area, Shaw stays with Genrika and they start bonding. After fleeing from the kidnappers again, they find themselves in a secret room where Shaw discovers Genrika records on tape all the illegal activities in the building, which may be why she is being targeted. The kidnappers throw chlorodifluoromethane in the room and take Genrika while Shaw is shot in the shoulder and knocked unconscious. Shaw is taken by a thug to be killed but she manages to free herself. Shaw ignores Finch's suggestion to go to a doctor and forces Genrika's cousin to reveal everything he knows. He states that he traded her for drugs that were given by the Bratva because they wanted to find the incriminating tapes.

Carter continues following Terney and finds him delivering money to a driver. He intercepts the seller just as Reese is following the client, connecting their cases. They interrogate the client, who reveals that HR wants to associate with the Russians to start distributing bath salts. Genrika is brought before Simmons. Shaw heals herself after getting blood from Yegorov and threatens Simmons into letting Genrika leave, promising to deliver the tapes to him.

Carter is confronted by her partner, Officer Mike Laskey (Brian Wiles) but she reveals she met with Terney and knows he is involved in HR. After she kills one of HR's members in a bar, she blackmails Laskey into working for her as the gun is registered in his name. Simmons is given a false lead and is brutally attacked by Reese before the police arrives. Shaw kills several kidnappers and retrieves Genrika before blowing up the hospital. Genrika enrols in a private school with Finch paying her fees and Shaw apologizes to Finch for not following orders, although Finch is not cross. That night, Shaw wakes up to discover Root (Amy Acker) standing next to her, and then Root tasers her.

== Reception ==
=== Viewers ===
In its original American broadcast, "Razgovor" was seen by an estimated 13.17 million household viewers and gained a 2.2/6 ratings share among adults aged 18–49, according to Nielsen Media Research. This means that 2.2 percent of all households with televisions watched the episode, while 6 percent of all households watching television at that time watched it. This was a 4% increase in viewership from the previous episode, which was watched by 12.69 million viewers with a 2.2/6 in the 18-49 demographics. With these ratings, Person of Interest was the third most watched show on CBS for the night, behind NCIS: Los Angeles and NCIS (TV series), first on its timeslot and fifth for the night in the 18-49 demographics, behind NCIS: Los Angeles, Agents of S.H.I.E.L.D., NCIS, and The Voice.

With Live +7 DVR factored in, the episode was watched by 17.33 million viewers with a 3.3 in the 18-49 demographics.

=== Critical reviews ===
"Razgovor" received near critical acclaim from critics. Matt Fowler of IGN gave the episode an "amazing" 9.0 out of 10 and wrote in his verdict, "'Разговор' was a hell of an episode, deepening both Shaw's story and the HR menace. With a little Root thrown in at the end for good measure. Fun, exciting, surprising and, ultimately, touching."

Phil Dyess-Nugent of The A.V. Club gave the episode a "B+" grade and wrote, "Part of me feels a little disappointed in myself for how much I enjoyed this episode. It's built on some very corny tropes, such as the hard-ass warrior woman Shaw encountering a resourceful but imperiled little girl who enables her to get in touch with her maternal side, and Reese slowly putting his gun away when he and the crooked cop Simmons are alone together, so the two of them can slug it out in the empty street, like men, dammit! In terms of narrative complexity, it was a game of checkers compared to last week’s episode, which was closer to atomic pinball, at the very least."
