= Lady Killer (Person of Interest) =

- Person of Interest episode
- Episode no.: Season 3 Episode 3
- Directed by: Omar Madha
- Written by: Amanda Segel
- Cinematography by: Manuel Billeter
- Editing by: Scott Powell
- Production code: 2J7603
- Original air date: October 8, 2013
- Running time: 44 minutes

Guest appearances
- Paige Turco as Zoe Morgan; Warren Kole as Ian Murphy; Bruce Altman as Dr. Ronald Carmichael; Ron Raines as Bruce Wellington; Boris McGiver as Hersh

Episode chronology
← Previous "Nothing to Hide"	Next → "Reasonable Doubt"

"'Lady Killer" is the 3rd episode of the third season of the American television drama series Person of Interest. It is the 48th overall episode of the series and is written by co-executive producer Amanda Segel and directed by Omar Madha. It aired on CBS in the United States and on CTV in Canada on October 8, 2013.

The series revolves around a computer program for the federal government known as "the Machine" that is capable of collating all sources of information to predict terrorist acts and to identify people planning them. A team, consisting of John Reese, Harold Finch and Sameen Shaw follow "irrelevant" crimes: lesser level of priority for the government. In the episode, the team follows a man who seemingly stalks women and is presumed to be a serial killer. Meanwhile, Root starts her escape attempt at the hospital with the help of the Machine.

According to Nielsen Media Research, the episode was seen by an estimated 11.65 million household viewers and gained a 2.0/6 ratings share among adults aged 18–49. Critical reception was positive, with critics praising the culmination of Root's arc in the hospital, with the case receiving more criticism for being "undercooked" and lack of proper payoff.

== Plot ==
Reese (Jim Caviezel) and Shaw follow the new number: Ian Murphy (Warren Kole), a man who has been dating many women in a very short period of time. Checking his apartment, Reese discovers evidence of Murphy stalking women and more information leads the team to believe that Murphy is a serial killer.

Using an app that Murphy frequents, Shaw, Carter (Taraji P. Henson) and Zoe Morgan (Paige Turco) go to a nightclub to try to get close to Murphy with Reese and Fusco (Kevin Chapman) watching over them. Murphy arrives and invites Carter for dinner at his house the next day, which she reluctantly accepts, making her the new target of Murphy. Carter has dinner with Murphy at his house and the evening turns out to be calm, ending with a kiss. Outside, two hitmen approach Murphy and Carter and Shaw shoot them to defend him.

Meanwhile, Hersh (Boris McGiver) begins looking for Root (Amy Acker) in many psychiatric hospitals. In her session with Dr. Carmichael (Bruce Altman), Root states that the Machine has a plan for her, which includes being held at that hospital. That night, Root uses the Machine to steal prescriptions from the hospital. Finch (Michael Emerson) calls the hospital, and finds that someone else asked about Root.

Fusco discovers that the hitmen that tried to kill Murphy were sent by Bruce Wellington (Ron Raines), a philanthropist whose daughter Dana was killed. Dana was also one of Murphy's ex-girlfriends. The team questions Murphy and he explains that while he admits to stalking the women, he only sees it as "research" and that he never hurt anyone, as their relationships aren't supposed to last long. He also explains that he dated Dana in college, she got pregnant but he was paid by Wellington's men to leave town, threatening to kill him if he returned and being told that Dana had an abortion. He never contacted the family and only recently attended Dana's funeral, where Wellington screamed at him. Finch later discovers that, contrary to what Wellington said, Dana didn't have an abortion as Wellington never liked Murphy and didn't want him anywhere close to him. His son, Alex, has been living with his aunt.

Reese, Shaw and Zoe confront Wellington about keeping the child and knock him out. Murphy, on the other hand, poses as Alex's driver, and takes him to a park to talk with him. Carter then helps Murphy get Alex's birth certificate, which will grant him custody of his son. At the hospital, Root uses the prescriptions to incapacitate guards in the hospital through the ventilation system. Hersh arrives and starts a shootout, but Root manages to shoot him in the shoulder, although the Machine tells her to not kill him. Root escapes just as Finch arrives to the hospital and gazes in horror at the scene.

== Reception ==
=== Viewers ===
In its original American broadcast, "Lady Killer" was seen by an estimated 11.65 million household viewers and gained a 2.0/6 ratings share among adults aged 18–49, according to Nielsen Media Research. This means that 2.0 percent of all households with televisions watched the episode, while 6 percent of all households watching television at that time watched it. This was a 6% decrease in viewership from the previous episode, which was watched by 12.35 million viewers with a 2.1/6 in the 18-49 demographics. With these ratings, Person of Interest was the third most watched show on CBS for the night, behind NCIS: Los Angeles and NCIS (TV series), second on its timeslot and seventh for the night in the 18-49 demographics, behind New Girl, Chicago Fire, NCIS: Los Angeles, NCIS, Agents of S.H.I.E.L.D., and The Voice.

With Live +7 DVR factored in, the episode was watched by 16.04 million viewers with a 3.1 in the 18-49 demographics.

=== Critical reviews ===
"Lady Killer" received positive reviews from critics. Matt Fowler of IGN gave the episode a "good" 7.5 out of 10 and wrote in his verdict, "Overall, 'Lady Killer' was fine, but the 'A-Story' felt a bit undercooked. The light-hearted bonding scenes were fun, but here wasn't much of a payoff in the end. Root's escape from the mental hospital on the other hand was freakin' awesome."

Phil Dyess-Nugent of The A.V. Club gave the episode a "B−" grade and wrote, "'Lady Killer' is an episode that's clearly trying to subvert audience expectations and do something different with the storytelling. On a few memorable occasions, the most notable probably being the first-season episode that introduced Elias, the show has used the viewers' preconceived notions of what a bad guy looks like to lay a trap, and let a sympathetic-seeming villain gain the upper hand. 'Lady Killer' goes the other way, setting up a character whose behavior, viewed from a distance, seems so smarmy and creepy that he must be a stalker, and is probably a serial killer. Then it turns out that he's a fine fellow, someone to be protected and helped out and even granted passionate-looking smoochies by Carter, no less. Given how much ink I've spilled arguing that this is a complicated show that has the capacity to reach for something more than the easy, kneejerk satisfactions of a formulaic violent procedural, I should be thrilled by this, and I do appreciate it, in the abstract."
