= Lethe (Person of Interest) =

- Person of Interest episode
- Episode no.: Season 3 Episode 11
- Directed by: Richard J. Lewis
- Written by: Erik Mountain
- Cinematography by: Manuel Billeter
- Editing by: Mark Conte
- Production code: 2J7611
- Original air date: December 17, 2013
- Running time: 44 minutes

Guest appearances
- Saul Rubinek as Arthur Claypool; Boris McGiver as Hersh; Leslie Odom Jr. as Peter Collier; Tom Degnan as Agent Easton; Tuck Milligan as Harold Finch's father; Chris Bert as Young Harold Finch; Camryn Manheim as Diane Claypool

Episode chronology
← Previous "The Devil's Share"	Next → "Aletheia"

"Lethe" is the 11th episode of the third season of the American television drama series Person of Interest. It is the 56th overall episode of the series and is written by co-producer Erik Mountain and directed by Richard J. Lewis. It aired on CBS in the United States and on CTV in Canada on December 17, 2013.

The series revolves around a computer program for the federal government known as "The Machine" that is capable of collating all sources of information to predict terrorist acts and to identify people planning them. A team, consisting of John Reese, Harold Finch and Sameen Shaw follow "irrelevant" crimes: lesser level of priority for the government. In the episode, with Reese leaving for Colorado, Finch reluctantly starts working on their new number, which belongs to an old MIT friend. However, the case proves to be even bigger than anticipated when his friend reveals he worked on a very important project. The title refers to "Lethe", one of the five rivers of the underworld of Hades in Greek mythology.

According to Nielsen Media Research, the episode was seen by an estimated 12.4 million household viewers and gained a 2.0/6 ratings share among adults aged 18–49. The episode received highly positive reviews, with critics praising the new focus on the "Samaritan" storyline, twists and performances, but Reese's storyline received a less favorable response.

== Plot ==
=== Flashbacks ===
In 1969, a young Finch (Parker Brightman) helps his father (Tuck Milligan) fix his truck engine. Finch's father leaves for a moment and when he returns, he finds Finch removed part of the engine. When his father mentions he shouldn't remove everything, Finch states that someone should've built the engine to resist being taken apart.

In 1971, Finch's father has started to suffer from memory loss. Finch then works a homemade system that could help him remember things and even intends to build a machine with his father's memories. But his father tells him that not everything can be fixed and even if he built a machine with his memories, it still wouldn't be himself.

In 1979, a teenager Finch (Chris Bert) shows his friends a technique where he can make a phone call from Iowa to Paris. They are then interrupted by a police officer arriving in his cruiser with Finch's father in the backseat, who was walking disoriented in the streets. Finch's father does not want his son to stop his future by taking care of him but Finch states his intention to get all information needed from every single university to himself.

=== Present day ===
Having regained consciousness, Reese (Jim Caviezel) has left the team without giving any answers. Despite Finch's (Michael Emerson) insistence that he has not received any numbers from the Machine, he is actually ignoring its calls to avoid receiving the numbers.

After a talk with Root (Amy Acker), Finch decides to work on the next number: Arthur Claypool (Saul Rubinek), an IT consultant whom Finch seems to recognize. Claypool has been admitted into the hospital after being diagnosed with glioblastoma, a type of brain tumor, and his memory often fails to remember certain things. Shaw (Sarah Shahi) poses as a doctor in the hospital and discovers that Claypool has a Secret Service security detail. She later overhears a conversation of Claypool with his wife (Camryn Manheim), in which he states that he needs to fix something called "Samaritan". Shaw and Finch find that Claypool worked for the National Security Agency and that "Samaritan" was one of its cancelled projects.

Shaw infiltrates one of Claypool's MRI scans and finds that he was injected with sodium thiopental for the purpose of questioning. Shaw is detained by Agent Easton (Tom Degnan) and questioned regarding her interest in Claypool. However, Easton is poisoned while eating and falls unconscious. Shaw and Finch then discover that the people questioning Claypool are from Vigilance. A team led by Peter Collier (Leslie Odom Jr.) soon arrives at the hospital and forces Shaw and Claypool's wife to extricate him from his room. Claypool resists as his memory fails to recognize them, until Finch arrives and Claypool recognizes him as a friend from the MIT.

After evading Vigilance's hitmen, Finch and Shaw take Claypool and his wife to a safe house. Claypool explains he worked for the NSA on "Samaritan", a program that detects acts of terrorism through an extensive database and suggest countermeasures. Samaritan works autonomously and is able to upgrades and adapt by itself, basically becoming an artificial intelligence. However, Claypool claims that Samaritan was destroyed in 2005 for fear of violating civil liberties.

Meanwhile, Reese has made it to Colorado and frequently attends a bar. One day, he finds Fusco (Kevin Chapman), who wants to talk with him. Reese confesses that the bar belongs to his late father, a Vietnam War veteran who died in a refinery accident a few months after returning. When Reese mentions that bad things happen regardless of their actions, Fusco takes him outside and they brutally fight until they are arrested by the local police.

At the safe house, Claypool remembers something crucial: his wife died years ago, which explains why he is unable to remember her. The woman identifies herself as Control, Shaw's former ISA employer. A group of hitmen led by Hersh (Boris McGiver) enter the room and subdue the team. Control then demands Finch reveal the location of the Machine or Claypool reveals Samaritan's, threatening to kill either Finch or Claypool unless one of them talks. The episode ends as the Machine starts analyzing threats to its assets and itself, changing Samaritan's status from "Deactivated" to "Unknown".

== Reception ==
=== Viewers ===
In its original American broadcast, "Lethe" was seen by an estimated 12.40 million household viewers and gained a 2.0/6 ratings share among adults aged 18–49, according to Nielsen Media Research. This means that 2.0 percent of all households with televisions watched the episode, while 6 percent of all households watching television at that time watched it. This was a 4% increase in viewership from the previous episode, which was watched by 11.89 million viewers with a 2.2/6 in the 18-49 demographics. With these ratings, Person of Interest was the third most watched show on CBS for the night, behind NCIS: Los Angeles and NCIS, second on its timeslot and fourth for the night in the 18-49 demographics, behind NCIS: Los Angeles, NCIS, and The Voice.

With Live +7 DVR factored in, the episode was watched by 16.68 million viewers with a 3.0 in the 18-49 demographics.

=== Critical reviews ===
"Lethe" received highly positive reviews from critics. Matt Fowler of IGN gave the episode a "great" 8.4 out of 10 rating and wrote in his verdict, "With 'Lethe,' Person of Interest continued its Season 3 pattern of sticking to larger seasonal arcs. They could, at any point, fall back into 'case of the week' mode, but they refuse and keep on truckin'. The numbers that pop up these days are almost always integral to the main series villains, making for more exciting, suspenseful episodes. This week's number connected directly to Harold and, in turn, Vigilance and Control. Reese's glowering excursion could have been better, but the main plot was great."

Phil Dyess-Nugent of The A.V. Club gave the episode an "A−" grade and wrote, "I've learned a lot about anticipating plot twists by watching TV for 75 percent of all the waking hours of my life, and I was sure as hell surprised. Cliffhanger accomplished. The show returns a week into January, at which point everyone who was watching tonight will suddenly exhale."
