= The Crossing (Person of Interest) =

- Person of Interest episode
- Episode no.: Season 3 Episode 9
- Directed by: Frederick E. O. Toye
- Written by: Denise Thé
- Cinematography by: Manuel Billeter
- Editing by: Scott Powell
- Production code: 2J7609
- Original air date: November 19, 2013
- Running time: 44 minutes

Guest appearances
- Clarke Peters as Alonzo Quinn; Lee Tergesen as William Petersen; Khalil Kain as Officer Lin; Paul O'Brien as Judge Andrew Monahan; Devin Ratray as Beat Cop; Robert John Burke as Officer Patrick Simmons

Episode chronology
← Previous "Endgame"	Next → "The Devil's Share"

"The Crossing" is the 9th episode of the third season of the American television drama series Person of Interest. It is the 54th overall episode of the series and is written by supervising producer Denise Thé and directed by Frederick E. O. Toye. It aired on CBS in the United States and on CTV in Canada on November 19, 2013.

The series revolves around a computer program for the federal government known as "The Machine" that is capable of collating all sources of information to predict terrorist acts and to identify people planning them. A team, consisting of John Reese, Harold Finch and Sameen Shaw follow "irrelevant" crimes: lesser level of priority for the government. In the episode, Reese and Carter escort a wounded Alonzo Quinn to a federal building to finally prosecute and take down HR. However, HR will not let them reach the building and prepare to ambush them. The episode is notorious for featuring the death of main character Joss Carter, played by Taraji P. Henson since the pilot of the series.

According to Nielsen Media Research, the episode was seen by an estimated 12.28 million household viewers and gained a 2.0/6 ratings share among adults aged 18–49. The episode received critical acclaim, critics praised nearly every single factor of the episode, with major highlights in acting (particularly Henson, Chapman and Caviezel), writing, the solution to the HR arc and twists. Many consider it one of the best episodes of the series.

== Plot ==
With the police closing in, Simmons (Robert John Burke) kills Judge Monahan (Paul O'Brien) to prevent him from talking and has his crew look for Carter (Taraji P. Henson) and Quinn (Clarke Peters) and also gives order to kill Reese (Jim Caviezel).

Reese, Carter and Quinn are on a subway train, heading to the Jacob K. Javits Federal Building where Quinn can be prosecuted. Reese receives a call from Finch (Michael Emerson), who tells him Reese is the new number and that HR spread his image around the city and all criminals will go after him. After taking down criminals in the subway, they are not able to use another train and Quinn destroys Reese's phone, losing contact with Finch. Desperate, Finch talks to Root (Amy Acker), asking her for help in talking to the Machine to get Reese's whereabouts. She will only help if she is set free, which Finch refuses.

Reese, Carter and Quinn then travel in an ambulance to allow them to pass the checkpoint. However, Simmons spots them and has the police shoot at them but they manage to escape. Fusco (Kevin Chapman) helps them escape by shooting two of HR officers but is knocked out by Simmons. Fusco is then tortured by having his fingers broken and Simmons finds the key that opens the safe deposit box that Carter mentioned had evidence against HR. Fusco gives him a fake location of the bank when Simmons threatens his son's life. As she won't reach them in time, Shaw (Sarah Shahi) sets to find Fusco.

Reese and Carter then seek refuge in a morgue and put Quinn on a sedative state, putting him in one of the compartments. Reese and Carter talk about their experience in combat and how something changed their lives. Reese mentions that he planned to kill himself in the subway until he met her and they kiss. HR arrives at the morgue thanks to a tip and causes a blackout. Cornered and with a limited amount of ammunition, Reese escapes through the vents to the hallway, intending to kill as many as he can so Carter and Quinn can escape. Despite Root's willingness to help, Finch still refuses to let her out of the cell.

Realizing that it was not the right bank, Simmons gives the torturers permission to kill Fusco and his son. The torturer lets Fusco have one final phone call with his kid as a hitman has been sent to kill him. Shaw arrives in time to kill the hitman and save his son, but because of this, she won't be able to save Fusco. Fusco uses his broken fingers to get rid of the handcuffs and strangles the torturer to death. In the morgue, Reese kills HR members while he distracts them and is shot in the shoulder as he escapes the morgue. Before a HR officer kills him, Reese reaches honest police officers, who arrest him for gun possession. Finch arrives and turns on the power, letting Carter take Quinn out of the building.

By early morning, Carter brings Quinn to the federal building where he is arrested. This causes a chain of events as HR members are arrested although Simmons is still at large. Carter is reinstated as Detective, and she reveals her knowledge of the Machine to Finch. Fusco thanks Shaw for saving his son. She also releases Reese and both leave the precinct at night just as Finch arrives to pick them up. Finch hears a payphone ringing and Simmons emerges, shooting Reese and Carter before Carter returns fire, wounding him and forcing Simmons to leave. A wounded Reese stays alongside a fatally-wounded Carter, promising to take care of her son before she dies. The episode ends with a grief-stricken Reese crying over Carter's body while Finch looks in horror.

== Production ==
=== Writing ===
The episode features the death of Joss Carter, who has been a main character since the very first episode of the series. Series creator and showrunner Jonathan Nolan commented November 2013 about a 3-episode arc that would air during the November Sweeps, stating "We promised our actors and our audience that these characters wouldn't be static, stuck in an endless loop — that they would have a journey. And, of course, every journey comes to an end". Amidst rumors of a main character death, recurring cast member Carrie Preston teased the death, "It's going to be sad for everybody — not just the fans but also the cast. But I think the way [the show] is handling it is quite remarkable."

Nolan told Henson about her death at the beginning of 2013, indicating, "It was a bittersweet conversation, because we love working with her and vice versa. It's been a great creative collaboration. As sad as we were to see her go, I think we were all excited [Taraji, us and the writers] to get into a juicy piece of material, to tell a tragedy." He went on to explain the decision, "For this story [HR, police corruption] it was a natural boiling point that would put her first and foremost into focus. And frankly, as writers, we've long said that Carter was the heart of the show, and your perverse impulse as a writer is to do as much damage to the audience as possible. There's nothing more dastardly than — if Carter's the heart of the show — breaking that heart for the audience in the middle of the season." Executive producer Greg Plageman also commented on the decision, "What felt natural to us was with HR being with us from the pilot, their diabolical no-goodness, it felt like they had it in for Carter... it got to a point where you think if this person is going to hold her head up and walk into a precinct ever again she's going to have to take them on and in the conversations she had with her son, it was kind of understood what she had to do and it felt like the time was right." The kiss scene between Reese and Carter was unscripted, with Nolan commenting, "It was just a swapping scars moment. So when the actors went there, it was all of their own volition, because in that moment they both felt it. And when you removed that element, the scene didn't feel quite the same."

== Reception ==
=== Viewers ===
In its original American broadcast, "The Crossing" was seen by an estimated 12.28 million household viewers and gained a 2.0/6 ratings share among adults aged 18–49, according to Nielsen Media Research. This means that 2.0 percent of all households with televisions watched the episode, while 6 percent of all households watching television at that time watched it. This was a 3% decrease in viewership from the previous episode, which was watched by 12.60 million viewers with a 2.0/6 in the 18-49 demographics. With these ratings, Person of Interest was the third most watched show on CBS for the night, behind NCIS: Los Angeles and NCIS, third on its timeslot and sixth for the night in the 18-49 demographics, behind Agents of S.H.I.E.L.D., NCIS: Los Angeles, David Blaine: Real or Magic, NCIS, and The Voice.

With Live +7 DVR factored in, the episode was watched by 17.05 million viewers with a 3.2 in the 18-49 demographics.

=== Critical reviews ===
"The Crossing" received critical acclaim from critics. Matt Fowler of IGN gave the episode a perfect "masterpiece" 10 out of 10 rating and wrote in his verdict, "'The Crossing' had me spinning from its very first moments. Expertly playing off of, and playing with, my expectations, it set up several red herring-deaths in very emotional ways. Leaving the actual, final death, a total shock. Thoughtful, thrilling, and (ultimately) sad."

Phil Dyess-Nugent of The A.V. Club gave the episode a "B" grade and wrote, "It would be premature and overly pessimistic to say that, in its determination to get the country revved up for a big honking tear-jerking game changer of an episode, Person of Interest jumped the shark, and it would also amount to rank ingratitude for what was often a riveting hour of television. But the show definitely overplayed its hand. It's always been very good at surprises that come out of nowhere — but tonight, the show practically sat in your lap, whispering, 'Ooh, something big's gonna go down tonight, I want to be extra sure that you can handle it.' There were indeed a couple of things that I had trouble handling, but not in a good, sensory-overload kind of way."
