= Provenance (Person of Interest) =

- Person of Interest episode
- Episode no.: Season 3 Episode 14
- Directed by: Jeffrey Hunt
- Written by: Sean Hennen
- Cinematography by: Manuel Billeter
- Editing by: Mark Conte
- Production code: 2J7614
- Original air date: February 4, 2014
- Running time: 44 minutes

Guest appearances
- Elaine Tan as Kelly Lin; Henri Lubatti as Alain Bouchard; Gene Farber as Cyril; Christopher Neal Jackson as Farrow; Stelio Savante as Aris Zappo

Episode chronology
← Previous "4C"	Next → "Last Call"

"Provenance" is the 14th episode of the third season of the American television drama series Person of Interest. It is the 59th overall episode of the series and is written by Sean Hennen and directed by Jeffrey Hunt. It aired on CBS in the United States and on CTV in Canada on February 4, 2014.

The series revolves around a computer program for the federal government known as "The Machine" that is capable of collating all sources of information to predict terrorist acts and to identify people planning them. A team, consisting of John Reese, Harold Finch and Sameen Shaw follow "irrelevant" crimes: lesser level of priority for the government. In the episode, the team pursues a thief that has been stealing valuable art objects. However, the thief turns out to be forced to work for a criminal that has her daughter kidnapped and the team helps the thief to save her daughter. The title refers to "Provenance", the chronology of the ownership, custody or location of a historical object. Despite being credited, Amy Acker does not appear in the episode.

According to Nielsen Media Research, the episode was seen by an estimated 12.35 million household viewers and gained a 2.1/6 ratings share among adults aged 18–49. The episode received generally positive reviews, although some critics were more critical towards the deviation of the main storyline and lack of plot development.

== Plot ==
Reese (Jim Caviezel) returns to work just as a new number appears: Kelli Lin (Elaine Tan), a former silver medal-winning Olympic gymnast. He, Finch (Michael Emerson) and Shaw (Sarah Shahi) attend one of Kelli's exhibition parties when the event is interrupted by a thief who robs an artifact. Shaw follows the figure, whom she realizes is Kelli, right before Kelli escapes.

Kelli then meets with her boss, Cyril (Gene Farber) to give him the product. Shaw investigates Kelli's house, learning that her next operation is to steal a Gutenberg Bible that is being shipped out that night. Shaw foils the plan but is confronted by Kelli, who reveals that Cyril kidnapped her daughter and is forcing her to commit robberies. The team decides to help her get the Bible and confront Cyril in the process.

Finch contacts Interpol Agent, Alain Bouchard (Henri Lubatti), who has been following Kelli and her crew for some time, and directs him to Kelli's apartment. He confronts Kelli, but due to lack of proper evidence, he can't arrest her. He contacts Farrow (Christopher Neal Jackson), a guard at the building where the Bible is held, to warn him to increase security and move the Bible. This is actually part of Finch's plan to access the Bible. Using a copy of Farrow's prints allows the team to enter the building. While Shaw and Kelli infiltrate, Reese allows himself to be arrested, but Fusco (Kevin Chapman) takes him in to safely escort him out. Despite the guards discovering their plan, Shaw and Kelli successfully steal the Bible.

Kelli delivers the Bible to Cyril, but Cyril still refuses to let her and her daughter go. Their conversation is heard by Bouchard, who was brought to Finch's car. Reese arrives at Kelli's daughter's location and manages to rescue her; an event which Cyril sees on his surveillance feed. Shaw stops Cyril from killing Kelli, and both Kelli and Cyril are arrested by Bouchard. In an interrogation room at the NYPD, Bouchard places a handcuff key on a desk, allowing her to leave. Kelli and her daughter happily reunite. That night, the team decides to celebrate their victory with a toast, with Reese honoring Carter by pouring a glass for their "missing member."

== Reception ==
=== Viewers ===
In its original American broadcast, "Provenance" was seen by an estimated 12.35 million household viewers and gained a 2.1/6 ratings share among adults aged 18–49, according to Nielsen Media Research. This means that 2.1 percent of all households with televisions watched the episode, while 6 percent of all households watching television at that time watched it. This was a 2% decrease in viewership from the previous episode, which was watched by 12.54 million viewers with a 2.0/6 in the 18-49 demographics. With these ratings, Person of Interest was the third most watched show on CBS for the night, behind NCIS: Los Angeles and NCIS, second on its timeslot and fifth for the night in the 18-49 demographics, behind The Biggest Loser, Agents of S.H.I.E.L.D., NCIS: Los Angeles, and NCIS.

With Live +7 DVR factored in, the episode was watched by 17.15 million viewers with a 3.2 in the 18-49 demographics.

=== Critical reviews ===
"Provenance" received generally positive reviews from critics. Matt Fowler of IGN gave the episode a "good" 7.4 out of 10 rating and wrote in his verdict, "There's nothing wrong with a stand-alone POI episode, but it's not going to grab me like the arc episodes. And without Vigilance, Decima, Root, or Control, I'm not really going to feel a palpable danger element. It was a feel-good caper episode where Reese got to fumble with a bow tie, Shaw got to look hot in a dress, and Fusco actually got invited up into Finch's library. In the end, they honored their fallen, but this was the pick-me-up mission that revitalized the team and set them up for adventures to come."

Phil Dyess-Nugent of The A.V. Club gave the episode a "B" grade and wrote, "The episode itself works fine as an enjoyable, stand-alone placeholder, but here's hoping that when the show returns with new installments, the past will be buried and its engine will be fully revved up."
