= Liberty (Person of Interest) =

- Person of Interest episode
- Episode no.: Season 3 Episode 1
- Directed by: Chris Fisher
- Written by: Greg Plageman & Denise Thé
- Cinematography by: Manuel Billeter
- Editing by: Ray Daniels
- Production code: 2J7601
- Original air date: September 24, 2013
- Running time: 44 minutes

Guest appearances
- Rey Valentin as Jack Salazar; Max Martini as Rip; Bruce Altman as Dr. Ronald Carmichael; Alano Miller as Robert Johnson Philips; David Valcin as Scarface; Enrico Colantoni as Carl Elias

Episode chronology
← Previous "God Mode"	Next → "Nothing to Hide"

"'Liberty" is the 1st episode and season premiere of the third season of the American television drama series Person of Interest. It is the 46th overall episode of the series and is written by executive producer Greg Plageman and supervising producer Denise Thé and directed by co-executive producer Chris Fisher. It aired on CBS in the United States and on CTV in Canada on September 24, 2013.

The series revolves around a computer program for the federal government known as "the Machine" that is capable of collating all sources of information to predict terrorist acts and to identify people planning them. A team, consisting of John Reese, Harold Finch and Sameen Shaw follow "irrelevant" crimes: lesser level of priority for the government. In the episode, the team must follow a sailor who may be involved in diamond smuggling. Meanwhile, Root is being held at a psychiatric hospital while Carter adjusts to life as a patrol officer following her demotion. This is the first episode with Amy Acker and Sarah Shahi credited as main cast regulars.

According to Nielsen Media Research, the episode was seen by an estimated 12.44 million household viewers and gained a 2.3/6 ratings share among adults aged 18–49. Critical reception to the episode was positive, although critics commented on the perceived lack of character development in the episode.

== Plot ==
Reese (Jim Caviezel) saves a diplomat's son from a group of kidnappers. Meanwhile, Shaw (Sarah Shahi) saves a con man from a mobster after the con man scammed his daughter and kills his hitmen. Despite helping them, Finch (Michael Emerson) starts worrying about the level of violence that Shaw employs in her missions.

The new number is Petty officer second class Jack Salazar (Rey Valentin), a sailor who only joined the Navy to avoid jail time and along with his crew, is leaving for the Fleet Week. Reese loses track of Salazar after a bar fight. He asks for help from Carter (Taraji P. Henson), who has been demoted to patrol officer. Carter takes him to an underground nightclub in a deli where sailors are present, including Salazar. Reese then sees as Salazar is attacked by FORECON Marines who try to kidnap him but Reese saves him and flees with him.

While tending to their wounds, the team realizes that Salazar's friend, Robert Johnson "R.J." Philips (Alano Miller), participated in smuggling with the FORECON Marines and smuggled diamonds in Cuban cigars. R.J. has been kidnapped by the smugglers and Reese and Salazar locate his hideout, finding R.J. tied to a chair with explosives ready to blow. The lead of the smugglers, Rip (Max Martini), appears on a phone and indicates to Salazar that he must meet with him and follow his instructions or R.J. will die.

Carter decides to help them and asks Elias (Enrico Colantoni), who is being protected in a basement after releasing him. Elias gets him the address of a Flatiron District pawnshop where the smugglers may be heading. Reese leaves to find Salazar and the smugglers while Fusco (Kevin Chapman) helps to defuse the bomb. Salazar gets to the pawn shop with the diamonds and gets himself into a conflict between the smugglers and the Russian pawnshop owners. It quickly descends into a shootout with Reese and Salazar fleeing and Shaw killing many of the Russians to save them. Unknown to everyone, Scarface (David Valcin), Elias' right hand, enters the pawn shop, gets the diamonds and money and leaves.

Fusco manages to defuse the bomb and free R.J. After the events, Carter returns home, where it is revealed that she has her own investigation on HR and Cal Beecher's murder. Reese talks with Salazar, who is about to return to his post, and both wonder about the pursuit of a happy life.

Throughout the episode, it's shown that Root (Amy Acker) has been held at a psychiatric hospital under the name "Robin". Root constantly lies to her therapist, Dr. Ronald Carmichael (Bruce Altman), and even steals his phone, which gives her solitary confinement. In the final scene, she has another session with Carmichael, where she reveals very personal details about him and his unethical activities in the hospital, revealing she still uses the Machine. She wants him to return her the phone because she was arguing with the Machine about the possibility of killing Carmichael.

== Reception ==
=== Viewers ===
In its original American broadcast, "Liberty" was seen by an estimated 12.44 million household viewers and gained a 2.3/6 ratings share among adults aged 18–49, according to Nielsen Media Research. This means that 2.3 percent of all households with televisions watched the episode, while 6 percent of all households watching television at that time watched it. This was a 6% decrease in viewership from the previous episode, which was watched by 13.16 million viewers with a 2.4/7 in the 18-49 demographics. It was also a 13% decrease in viewership from the season premiere, which was watched by 14.28 million viewers with a 2.9/8 in the 18-49 demographics. With these ratings, Person of Interest was the third most watched show on CBS for the night, behind NCIS: Los Angeles and NCIS (TV series), second on its timeslot and seventh for the night in the 18-49 demographics, behind Chicago Fire, NCIS: Los Angeles, The Goldbergs, NCIS, Agents of S.H.I.E.L.D., and The Voice.

With Live +7 DVR factored in, the episode was watched by 16.76 million viewers with a 3.3 in the 18-49 demographics.

=== Critical reviews ===
"Liberty" received positive reviews from critics. Matt Fowler of IGN gave the episode a "good" 7.8 out of 10 and wrote in his verdict, "All in all though, an enjoyable outing. Nothing huge went down, but I do like the shading of Carter. She's still helping Reese, but it's clear that she's got her own things going on. Her own agenda. And given all that Fusco's done, who'd have ever thought that she'd wind up being the one who got demoted. It must sting. Even more than she lets on. Also, again, the Root stuff was great. Giving us our only insight into a possible through line for the season. A season that will mostly likely also contain tons of stuff with HR, Control, and Decima for sure."

Phil Dyess-Nugent of The A.V. Club gave the episode a "B+" grade and wrote, "Person of Interest needs time to work up a head of steam again, but the prognosis for season three looks pretty good from where I'm sitting. It's always fun to watch people who really enjoy their work."
