= The Devil's Share =

- Person of Interest episode
- Episode no.: Season 3 Episode 10
- Directed by: Chris Fisher
- Written by: Amanda Segel; Jonathan Nolan
- Production code: 2J7610
- Original air date: November 26, 2013

Guest appearances
- Robert John Burke as Patrick Simmons; Clarke Peters as Alonzo Quinn; Laz Alonso as Paul Carter; Richard Brooks as Lead Marshal Pollack; Brian Tarantina as Seamus Yorke; Kwoade Cross as Taylor Carter; Enrico Colantoni as Carl Elias (uncredited); David Valcin as Anthony Marconi/Scarface (uncredited)

Episode chronology
← Previous "The Crossing"	Next → "Lethe"

"The Devil's Share" is the tenth episode of the third season of the crime thriller drama Person of Interest, which aired on CBS on November 26, 2013. "The Devil's Share" is the last part of a trilogy of episodes that began with "Endgame" and "The Crossing", the eighth and ninth episodes of the third season.

This episode was written by series creator Jonathan Nolan alongside co-executive producer Amanda Segel, and was directed by Chris Fisher. The episode marks the end of the series' long-running HR storyline and picks up from the death of series regular Detective Joss Carter from the previous episode, chronicling John Reese's vengeful hunt for her killer, corrupt NYPD officer Patrick Simmons, while the rest of the team attempts to stop him. Flashbacks for multiple characters occur throughout the episode.

Upon airing, the episode was watched by 11.89 million viewers with a 2.2/6 ratings share. It received overwhelmingly positive reviews, praising the writing, directing and acting performances.

== Plot ==
Picking up from Carter's (Taraji P. Henson) death at the hands of Simmons (Robert John Burke) in "The Crossing," a montage of events plays to "Hurt" by Johnny Cash: Finch (Michael Emerson), Shaw (Sarah Shahi) and Fusco (Kevin Chapman) attend Carter's funeral along with several NYPD officers, Finch learns that Simmons is their next POI, and Shaw and a grief-stricken Reese (Jim Caviezel) separately go about the city ruthlessly interrogating criminals on Simmons' whereabouts. Elsewhere, Simmons receives fake Canadian passports to enable his escape.

A flashback shows Finch attending a therapy session not long after the death of his friend Nathan Ingram; he and the therapist discuss survivor's guilt, with the therapist assuring Finch that his feelings of responsibility and guilt will pass alongside the other survivors of the ferry bombing. Finch questions her assurance by suggesting everything that happened is indeed his fault.

In the present day, Finch serves a still-imprisoned Root (Amy Acker) food and receives an offer of help from her, along with a warning about impending dangers on a larger scale. Finch is interrupted by a phone call from Fusco, who is investigating the scene of an SUV Reese crashed earlier belonging to three forgers working for one Seamus Yorke, who they believe can lead them to Simmons. Shaw has already located Yorke (Brian Tarantina) and is attempting to interrogate him, agreeing to locate Reese but only to save him from gunshot wounds he suffered in the previous episode. Yorke names HR leader Alonzo Quinn (Clarke Peters) as the only one who knows of Simmons' escape plan. Fusco and Shaw find Quinn's lawyer dead and learn that Russian mobsters are also targeting Simmons. They reluctantly decide it's time to request Root's help.

The next flashback centers on Shaw, at that time a physician, being interviewed over her lack of sympathy for her patients. Her interviewer notes that her technical mastery isn't the kind of motivation sympathy provides to save patients and tells her that she is a "fixer" and not a "healer."

Despite potential consequences, Root is freed and directs them to an apartment in which Quinn is being held under police custody. They evade the army of U.S. Marshals and Russian mob forces closing in, while Reese detonates a nearby car to provide a distraction.

The third flashback shows a supposedly militant Reese being interviewed by a CIA Special Ops psychologist on how extreme his measures can be pushed in order to protect his country. Reese claims to have already been through the horrors the psychologist presents as part of Reese's new job, revealing that he is in fact already a CIA operative sent out to find a traitor among them: the psychologist. Reese shoots the man dead.

Reese battles his way through the marshals while Quinn attempts negotiating with the head marshal, Pollack (Richard Brooks), in his hotel room. Reese's attacks outside change Pollack's mind, but Reese sets off emergency flares throughout the halls and fights his way into Quinn's room. Reese demands to know Simmons' escape route in the next three minutes, dismissive of Quinn's protestations of loyalty. Down below, the team is able to make it past the marshals and Finch arrives just as Reese is about to kill Quinn, having obtained Simmons' location. Finch tries to convince Reese that killing Quinn would betray Carter's principles of bringing Quinn down lawfully, but Reese pulls the trigger of his weapon, but it fails to fire. Reese collapses and is moved out while officers enter and take Quinn away. In the car, Root points out that Reese wasn't Simmons' only predator, while Fusco is seen stealing the paper on which Quinn wrote Simmons' location.

The fourth and final flashback depicts Fusco receiving therapy after having shot a drug dealer. His therapist attempts to empathize with his potential guilt or trauma following the incident, but Fusco reveals to him that the shooting was deliberate, and out of retribution for the dealer's killing of a rookie cop who was expecting a child. He identifies the presence of the "devil's share" within his act, a term for righteous revenge. Satisfied, he leaves.

Fusco confronts Simmons at an airfield, having canceled his flight out of New York. Simmons tries to goad Fusco into killing him, but the two instead engage in a savage fistfight, of which Fusco is the victor. He explains to Simmons that his devotion to Carter came from her instilling in him the correct moral code borne by a true police officer, and refuses to betray that by killing Simmons. He follows by arresting him and delivering him to the precinct shortly afterwards, stunning his coworkers.

Shaw confirms to Finch that Reese, who is hospitalized, will survive. Finch returns to the library to find Root having willingly kept herself in containment, claiming to be there to prepare for a larger battle at hand.

That night, Carl Elias (Enrico Colantoni) visits a hospitalized Simmons, explaining his debt to Carter and how the moral principles of people of his level extend beyond those of civilization. Free of Carter's moral conduct following her death, Elias uses this as justification to kill Simmons, and then watches while his henchman Scarface (David Valcin) garrotes Simmons to death.

== Production ==
"The Devil's Share" was written by series creator Jonathan Nolan and co-executive producer Amanda Segel, marking both writers' eighth episodes written for the series. It was directed by co-executive producer Chris Fisher, his sixth directing credit for the series.

== Reception ==
=== Critical reception ===
"The Devil's Share" was highly acclaimed by critics and audiences alike, being praised for its opening sequence, its writing, Fisher's direction, and the acting performances, especially those by Caviezel and Chapman. Matt Fowler of IGN gave the episode an "amazing" rating of a 9.3 out of 10, also praising the opening sequence, as well as the flashbacks and the ending scene. Phil Dyess-Nugent of The A.V. Club gave the episode a perfect A rating, praising the atmosphere of grief the episode built and feeling Fusco's character development served as an appropriate tribute to Carter.

=== Viewership ===
Upon airing, the episode was watched by 11.89 million viewers with a 2.2/6 ratings share.
