= Deus Ex Machina (Person of Interest) =

- Person of Interest episode
- Episode no.: Season 3 Episode 23
- Directed by: Chris Fisher
- Written by: Greg Plageman & David Slack
- Cinematography by: David Insley
- Editing by: Mark Conte
- Production code: 2J7623
- Original air date: May 13, 2014
- Running time: 44 minutes

Guest appearances
- Leslie Odom Jr. as Peter Collier; John Doman as Senator Ross Garrison; John Nolan as John Greer; Julian Ovenden as Jeremy Lambert; Boris McGiver as Hersh; Peter Scanavino as Adams; Joseph Melendez as Manuel Rivera; Camryn Manheim as Control

Episode chronology
← Previous "A House Divided"	Next → "Panopticon"

"Deus Ex Machina" is the 23rd episode and season finale of the third season of the American television drama series Person of Interest. It is the 68th overall episode of the series and is written by executive producer Greg Plageman and co-executive producer David Slack and directed by co-executive producer Chris Fisher. It aired on CBS in the United States and on CTV in Canada on May 13, 2014.

The series revolves around a computer program for the federal government known as "The Machine" that is capable of collating all sources of information to predict terrorist acts and to identify people planning them. A team, consisting of John Reese, Harold Finch and Sameen Shaw follow "irrelevant" crimes: lesser level of priority for the government. In the episode, Finch and other people involved in the Northern Lights project are being put on trial by Vigilance. While Reese and Hersh try to locate them, Root and Shaw work in order to avoid Samaritan's activation. The title refers to "Deus ex machina", a plot device whereby a seemingly unsolvable problem in a story is suddenly and abruptly resolved by an unexpected and unlikely occurrence.

According to Nielsen Media Research, the episode was seen by an estimated 10.95 million household viewers and gained a 1.9/6 ratings share among adults aged 18–49. The episode received critical acclaim, with critics praising the writing, acting, ending and the new focus for the next season.

== Plot ==
=== Flashbacks ===
In 2010, Peter (Leslie Odom Jr.) is kidnapped by a van after receiving the message from an unknown person. He is taken to a warehouse where someone communicates through a television to maintain anonymity. The person identifies itself as a spokesperson for Vigilance, a hacktivist group aware of Peter's activities in the Darknet. Vigilance wants Peter to be part of their organization. When he accepts, he is told that he will now go by the name "Peter Collier".

In 2012, Collier helps his group in obtaining a hard drive. However, he is pressured by the unknown person to put more effort in Vigilance and he convinces his group to retrieve more drives just to make sure their mission is accomplished.

In 2013, after another mission, one of Vigilance's agents, Adams (Peter Scanavino), questions Collier's methods and calls for action. Vigilance then discovers that Adams is an FBI informant and kills him. They leave the storage unit, revealing Jason Greenfield's code in the darkness.

=== Present day ===
Collier starts broadcasting the trial worldwide. Root (Amy Acker) gives an instruction to Reese (Jim Caviezel), Shaw (Sarah Shahi) and Hersh (Boris McGiver) to go to a location. However, worried that Root may be in danger, Shaw decides to go help her while Reese and Hersh go on the mission.

The first to stand trial is presidential assistant Rivera (Joseph Melendez), who denies his involvement in the project. When Rivera gets aggressive on the stand, Collier kills him. Senator Garrison (John Doman) is next and he points to Control (Camryn Manheim) as the person behind Northern Lights. When questioned, Control neither confirms nor denies her involvement or knowledge of the project and the jury declares her guilty. When she is about to be executed for failing to name the creator, Finch (Michael Emerson) reveals himself as the creator of the Machine to protect her.

Reese and Hersh eventually rendezvous with Fusco (Kevin Chapman) and obtain the location of the trial from another Vigilance agent. At the trial, Finch agrees to confess as long as everyone else is released. He confesses that after the September 11 attacks, he worked with the government to stop more terrorist attacks before handing the Machine over. Reese and Hersh arrive and forces Vigilance to take everyone outside. There, they are ambushed by Decima's hitmen. Greer (John Nolan) then tells Collier that his plan to expose them failed as the equipment they used was redirected to an office in the other side of the town. Greer also confesses that he was the anonymous person who recruited him and used Vigilance to further defend his stake on Samaritan.

In the lab that houses Samaritan, Shaw meets with Root and helps her smuggle the servers into the server room. Root notes that only two servers are not activated; these belong to the government's approval and if it's turned on, Samaritan will be activated. At the court, Hersh inspects the area and discovers a bomb in the building that will detonate when the electricity returns. He tries to turn it off when Decima's hitmen try to kill him and the police starts swarming the court. Hersh tries one last time to deactivate but the bomb detonates, killing him and everyone else in the court. Greer then has his henchman kill Collier but Finch's execution is thwarted by Reese and Greer and his hitmen escape.

Seeing the explosion, Garrison authorizes Greer to activate Samaritan. Root then tells Reese and Finch to leave the Library and use fake IDs she left them to escape as Samaritan will find them. They destroy evidence and leave the Library just as the police arrives at the Library. She explains that after they didn't kill McCourt, their new mission wasn't stopping Samaritan but surviving it. Finch, Reese, Shaw, Root, Daniel Casey, Jason Greenfield and Daizo are given new IDs so Samaritan can't track them. Through a montage, Vigilance members are identified by Samaritan and killed by the police. With this, the team separates and start new lives. The episode ends as Samaritan asks for instructions. Greer replies, "What, my dear Samaritan, are your commands for us?" The answer: "Calculating response...".

== Reception ==
=== Viewers ===
In its original American broadcast, "Deus Ex Machina" was seen by an estimated 10.95 million household viewers and gained a 1.9/6 ratings share among adults aged 18–49, according to Nielsen Media Research. This means that 1.9 percent of all households with televisions watched the episode, while 6 percent of all households watching television at that time watched it. This was a 4% increase in viewership from the previous episode, which was watched by 10.50 million viewers with a 1.7/5 in the 18-49 demographics. With these ratings, Person of Interest was the third most watched show on CBS for the night, behind NCIS: Los Angeles and NCIS, first on its timeslot and fifth for the night in the 18-49 demographics, behind Agents of S.H.I.E.L.D., NCIS: Los Angeles, The Voice, and NCIS.

With Live +7 DVR factored in, the episode was watched by 14.63 million viewers with a 2.8 in the 18-49 demographics.

=== Critical reviews ===
"Deus Ex Machina" received critical acclaim from critics. Matt Fowler of IGN gave the episode an "amazing" 9.5 out of 10 rating and wrote in his verdict, "'Deus Ex Machina' was commanding and shattering. A truly giant way to take us out of Season 3. And while the entire trial may have wound up being even more of a farce than we originally expected, it was still an effective tension-builder that actually made me downgrade, in my mind, the level of Root's mission with Samaritan. Which was totally the point. Because that made it even more surprising when Samaritan came back around in the end as the main threat. And finding out that our heroes' fates were already sealed after Reese and Shaw refused to kill the senator back in 'Death Benefit' really helped shed a light on how important that episode was. And how important and desperate The Machine's order to kill someone was. That was The Machine's cold-hearted play and they opted not to carry it out. And now there's a new God in charge."

Phil Dyess-Nugent of The A.V. Club gave the episode an "A" grade and wrote, "A fair share of the characters on Person of Interest can be fairly characterized as monsters. But the season finale, which manages to sum up the past 23 episodes while hurtling toward the inevitable cliffhanger, reminds you that some of the worst monsters are motivated by what they see as patriotic ideals and noble goals. In the words of the filmmaker Jean Renoir, the terrible thing is that everyone has his reasons."

Sean McKenna of TV Fanatic gave the episode a 4.6 star rating out of 5 and wrote "It's clear that Person of Interest isn't keen on the usual; its expanding of the mythos, elaborating on the characters and maintaining its charm and fun on top of an entertaining story, is still holding strong in the third season. It's not necessarily the most complex, but its a compelling tale with a knack for sucking you in and having you back for more. And I can only imagine what more we will get when Person of Interest comes back online next fall."
