= 4C (Person of Interest) =

- Person of Interest episode
- Episode no.: Season 3 Episode 13
- Directed by: Stephen Williams
- Written by: Melissa Scrivner Love; Greg Plageman
- Cinematography by: David Insley
- Editing by: Ryan Malanaphy
- Production code: 2J7613
- Original air date: January 14, 2014
- Running time: 44 minutes

Guest appearances
- Sally Pressman as Holly; Samm Levine as Owen Matthews; Boris McGiver as Hersh; Marc Kudisch as Businessman; Bill English as Foster

Episode chronology
← Previous "Aletheia"	Next → "Provenance"

"4C" is the 13th episode of the third season of the American television drama series Person of Interest. It is the 58th overall episode of the series and is written by producer Melissa Scrivner Love and executive producer Greg Plageman and directed by Stephen Williams. It aired on CBS in the United States and on CTV in Canada on January 14, 2014.

The series revolves around a computer program for the federal government known as "The Machine" that is capable of collating all sources of information to predict terrorist acts and to identify people planning them. A team, consisting of John Reese, Harold Finch and Sameen Shaw follow "irrelevant" crimes: lesser level of priority for the government. In the episode, Reese boards an international flight to escape his former life. However, the Machine indicates that the plane is in danger due to a passenger aboard and Reese must prevent a crash and uncover the mystery. Despite being credited, Kevin Chapman and Amy Acker do not appear in the episode.

According to Nielsen Media Research, the episode was seen by an estimated 12.54 million household viewers and gained a 2.0/6 ratings share among adults aged 18–49. The episode received positive reviews, with critics praising Caviezel's performance and action scenes although the main case and Levine's performance received a more mixed response.

== Plot ==
Reese (Jim Caviezel) boards a plane to Rome after his original flight to Istanbul is delayed thanks to the Machine, planning to get away from his former life. On the plane, he finds himself annoyed with some of the passengers but bonds with the flight attendant, Holly (Sally Pressman).

After the plane takes off, Reese discovers a Federal Marshal unconscious in the bathroom with his gun missing. He also notices another Marshal next to a young man (Samm Levine) on the "4C" passenger seat. He contacts Finch (Michael Emerson), accusing him of putting him on a mission but Finch reaffirms he didn't do anything and he didn't even get a number from the Machine.

Reese notifies the other Marshal about the events when the Marshal falls unconscious after being drugged. A Colombian man tries to inject the young man, Owen Matthews, but Reese knocks him out. Matthews states he was being escorted by the Marshals for being a programmer in a black market case involving online drug trafficking. Finch meets with Shaw (Sarah Shahi) and discusses his idea that Matthews may be a relevant number and some organizations, including NSA and ISA are investigating him. Matthews confirms meeting with "The Sphinx", the head of the Black Market Bazaar. This explains the situation: the Sphinx wants to kill him as he is the only person who can identify and his cartel allies will also want him dead to avoid association.

Reese prevents another assassination attempt on Matthews by Mossad agents, overcoming them with the help of Holly. Shaw later discovers from a former associate that ISA sent her replacement to the plane to kill Matthews. Reese subdues the assassin and has Holly put Matthews on the cargo hold. Reese eventually discovers that Matthews is not a programmer who works for the Sphinx, he is the Sphinx. The Mossad agent regains consciousness and attacks Reese again but he is defeated when Matthews knocks him out with a golf club. On New York, Shaw interrogates Hersh (Boris McGiver) after poisoning him, she finds that Matthews was made the Sphinx to cover their profits on the Black Market Bazaar and finance the ISA. They want Matthews dead as he plans to go public about his real identity.

Finch finds that the Colombian cartel had another man aboard. The man is revealed to be one of the flight attendants, knocks the Captain out and plans to crash the plane. Using the trolley, Reese enters the cabin and starts fighting the assassin while Finch attempts to land the plane through his computer. Despite some difficulty, Finch manages to safely land the plane while Reese knocks the assassin. Reese then gets Matthews out of the plane through baggage and gives him an address so he can hide until Finch contacts him. Reese then goes on a date with Holly before she leaves for work, telling him to call her. He then spots Finch in a café and both talk briefly. He tells Finch he wants a new suit as he will come back and work with him again.

== Reception ==
=== Viewers ===
In its original American broadcast, "4C" was seen by an estimated 12.54 million household viewers and gained a 2.0/6 ratings share among adults aged 18–49, according to Nielsen Media Research. This means that 2.0 percent of all households with televisions watched the episode, while 6 percent of all households watching television at that time watched it. This was a 3% increase in viewership from the previous episode, which was watched by 12.10 million viewers with a 2.0/6 in the 18-49 demographics. With these ratings, Person of Interest was the third most watched show on CBS for the night, behind NCIS: Los Angeles and NCIS, first on its timeslot and fourth for the night in the 18-49 demographics, behind Agents of S.H.I.E.L.D., NCIS: Los Angeles, and NCIS.

With Live +7 DVR factored in, the episode was watched by 17.35 million viewers with a 3.2 in the 18-49 demographics.

=== Critical reviews ===
"4C" received positive reviews from critics. Matt Fowler of IGN gave the episode a "great" 8 out of 10 rating and wrote in his verdict, "'4C' wasn't exactly the come-to-Jesus episode Reese deserved, but overall it was a grimly amusing sky caper - showing us how The Machine now has the power to circumvent Finch entirely and place its own operatives where they need to be in order to stop disasters. The character of Owen was a bit too much, but watching Reese use most every found element on a commercial flight to battle his way through an avalanche of assassins was good stuff."

Phil Dyess-Nugent of The A.V. Club gave the episode an "A−" grade and wrote, "'4C' is about Reese's return to the land of the living, and the renewal of his commitment to the mission that gave him a reason to tighten up and move forward the last time he felt like resigning from the human race. It's also an example of this show's action-thriller formula at its purest, because Reese rediscovers his sense of mission not through talking things out or exploring his feelings but through action."
