= Aletheia (Person of Interest) =

- Person of Interest episode
- Episode no.: Season 3 Episode 12
- Directed by: Richard J. Lewis
- Written by: Lucas O'Connor
- Cinematography by: David Insley
- Editing by: Scott Powell
- Production code: 2J7612
- Original air date: January 7, 2014
- Running time: 44 minutes

Guest appearances
- Saul Rubinek as Arthur Claypool; Boris McGiver as Hersh; Leslie Odom Jr. as Peter Collier; Jennifer Lim as Bank Manager; Tuck Milligan as Harold Finch's father; Chris Bert as Young Harold Finch; Camryn Manheim as Control

Episode chronology
← Previous "Lethe"	Next → "4C"

"Aletheia" is the 12th episode of the third season of the American television drama series Person of Interest. It is the 57th overall episode of the series and is written by Lucas O'Connor and directed by Richard J. Lewis. It aired on CBS in the United States and on CTV in Canada on January 7, 2014.

The series revolves around a computer program for the federal government known as "The Machine" that is capable of collating all sources of information to predict terrorist acts and to identify people planning them. A team, consisting of John Reese, Harold Finch and Sameen Shaw follow "irrelevant" crimes: lesser level of priority for the government. In the episode, after escaping from their captors, the team must gain access to a safe deposit box that contains important drives for Samaritan. Meanwhile, Fusco tries to convince Reese to return to New York. The title refers to "Aletheia", a term used in the Ancient Greek philosophy that represents truth or disclosure in philosophy.

According to Nielsen Media Research, the episode was seen by an estimated 12.10 million household viewers and gained a 2.0/6 ratings share among adults aged 18–49. The episode received highly positive reviews, with critics praising the writing, directing, action scenes and performances (particularly Acker and Rubinek).

== Plot ==
=== Flashbacks ===
In 1979, a teenager Finch (Chris Bert) moves his father into an assisted-care center as his memory continues worsening.

In 1980, Finch infiltrates into ARPANET to give more power to his computer. He later visits his father at the center, warning him not to worry when government officials come to tell him that Finch committed treason. However, his father's memory has worsened and can't even recognize his son. He leaves behind a bird book, a topic that he and his father talked about very often during their time together.

=== Present day ===
Control (Camryn Manheim) holds Finch (Michael Emerson), Shaw (Sarah Shahi) and Claypool (Saul Rubinek) at gunpoint, demanding to know the location of the Machine and Samaritan. Root (Amy Acker) arrives and kills many of the henchmen so they can escape but Root is shot by Hersh (Boris McGiver) and captured. The rest manages to flee the location.

Finch, Shaw and Claypool arrive at a bank to retrieve backup drives for Samaritan. Claypool confesses to faking his memory loss as it would avoid problems with Control. While Finch and Claypool check the safe deposit box, Shaw notices Collier (Leslie Odom Jr.) and Vigilance hitmen entering the bank. Unable to escape, Finch locks himself with Claypool and the bank manager in the vault. The police arrives at the bank with Hersh (Boris McGiver) coming with them. Somewhere else, Root is tortured by Control to give her instructions on how to operate the Machine.

Meanwhile, at Colorado, Reese (Jim Caviezel) and Fusco (Kevin Chapman) are jailed after their fight outside the bar. While Fusco tries to prove him the importance of his actions, Reese expresses cynicism, noting that they just "delay the inevitable". They are released and Fusco leaves Colorado, failing to convince Reese.

In the vault, Finch and Claypool open the safe deposit box to find two Samaritan drives and a note left by Claypool on the day before the government shut down the program. However, Claypool notes that he fixed it and Samaritan is alive. As Collier's team prepares to blow up the vault's door, Finch tells Claypool to destroy the drives as Samaritan in the wrong hands could lead to disastrous results. Claypool is hesitant until Finch mentions he used his knowledge to create the Machine. With that, Claypool destroys the drives just as the door explodes.

Root is still being tortured and becomes deaf on her right ear. However, the torture allowed her to contact the Machine through a higher frequency and stole a knife from the table, allowing to release herself, subdue the guards and take Control hostage. She talks to her through the Machine, threatening her to stay away from her. In the bank, Shaw tries to escape with Finch and Claypool until Collier and his team intercept them. However, Reese and Fusco are revealed to work as part of Collier's team and kill Vigilance hitmen, forcing Collier to escape. Hersh and a raid team enter the bank and confront a Vigilance member before he commits suicide with a grenade, causing an explosion.

Finch receives a call from Root, who has left for an undisclosed location. She informs him that the bank manager died before they arrive at the bank and someone posed as her. She swapped the drives with replicas. Root then contacts Claypool, and with the use of the Machine, shows him footage of memories with his wife before her death. Finch receives a visit from Reese, who tells him he won't stay as he questions the true importance of the Machine and leaves. The imposter bank manager meets with her employer: John Greer (John Nolan) and gives him the drives. When she says no one else knows about it, Greer kills her and leaves, proclaiming that Samaritan is destined for something greater.

== Reception ==
=== Viewers ===
In its original American broadcast, "Aletheia" was seen by an estimated 12.10 million household viewers and gained a 2.0/6 ratings share among adults aged 18–49, according to Nielsen Media Research. This means that 2.0 percent of all households with televisions watched the episode, while 6 percent of all households watching television at that time watched it. This was a 3% decrease in viewership from the previous episode, which was watched by 12.40 million viewers with a 2.0/6 in the 18-49 demographics. With these ratings, Person of Interest was the third most watched show on CBS for the night, behind Intelligence and NCIS, first on its timeslot and third for the night in the 18-49 demographics, behind Intelligence, and NCIS.

With Live +7 DVR factored in, the episode was watched by 16.62 million viewers with a 3.0 in the 18-49 demographics.

=== Critical reviews ===
"Aletheia" received highly positive reviews from critics. Matt Fowler of IGN gave the episode a "great" 8.8 out of 10 rating and wrote in his verdict, "'Aletheia,' once again, made great use of Saul Rubinek while also giving Root another incredible Machine moment. Hell, she even got to speak *for* The Machine this time out, basically giving us its first words. And with HR gone, this storyline, and the Samaritan files, showed us how the remaining evil gangs are all connected in various ways. Reese is now a depressed drag, but I still applaud the fact that he won't be an easy fix. It sets up a new mission dynamic for Finch while also reinforcing the weight of Carter's death."

Phil Dyess-Nugent of The A.V. Club gave the episode an "A−" grade and wrote, "Person of Interest likes to keep lots of balls in the air, so that when it wants to bring things to a full boil, it can start crossing streams and throwing them together."
