= Samm Levine =

American actor (born 1982)

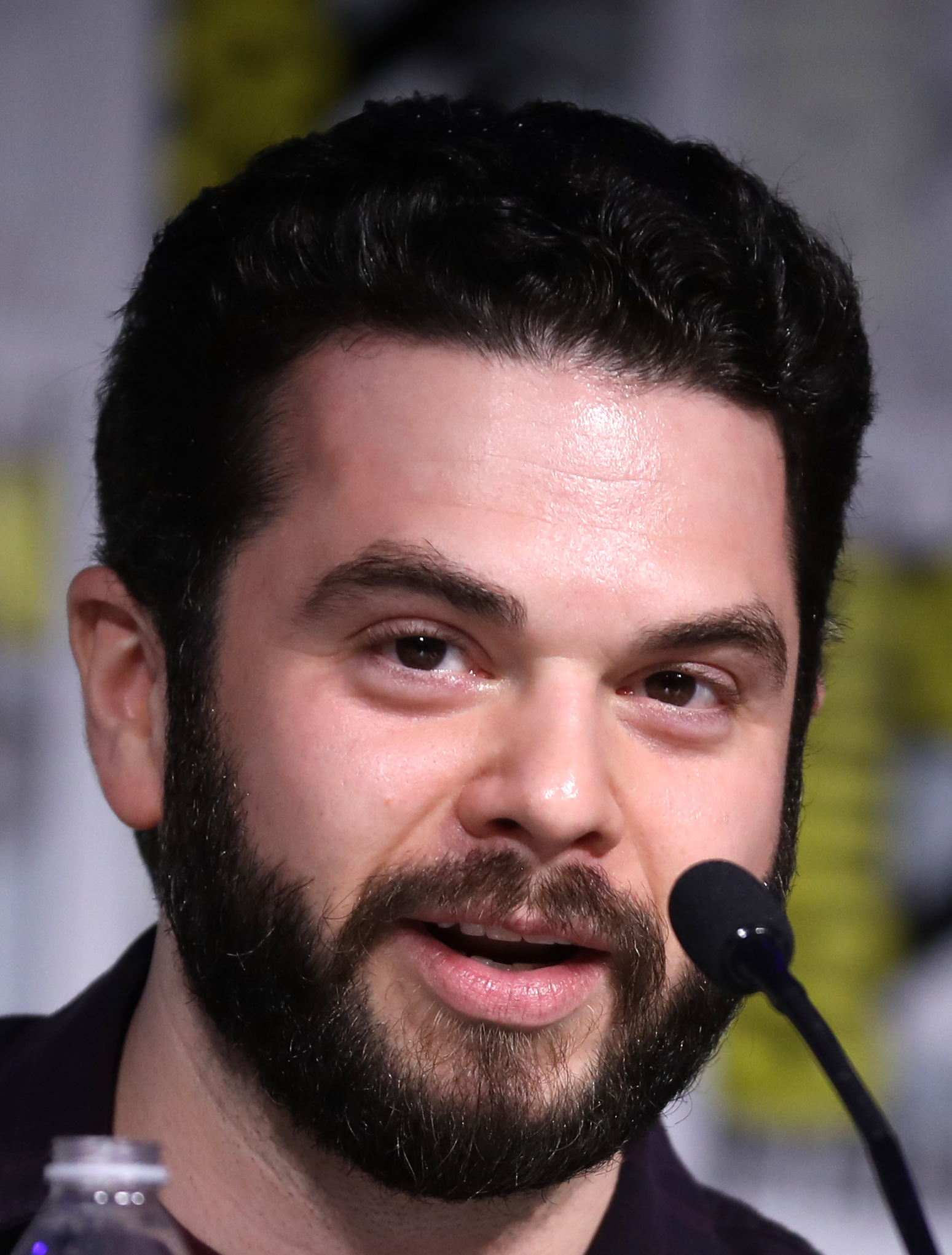
- Levine in 2023
- Born: Samuel Franklin Levine; March 12, 1982 (age 44); Park Ridge, Illinois, U.S.
- Occupation: Actor
- Years active: 1997–present
- Spouse: Rachel Cushing (m. 2022)

Samuel Franklin Levine (born March 12, 1982) is an American actor. He is known for his portrayal of Neal Schweiber on NBC's Freaks and Geeks and PFC Hirschberg in the 2009 film Inglourious Basterds. Levine was also the sidekick and fill-in host on the internet talk show Kevin Pollak's Chat Show. Levine was a regular competitor on Collider's Movie Trivia Schmoedown.

== Early life ==
Levine was born in Park Ridge, Illinois, the son of Lynne, a mortgage broker, and Harris Levine, a dentist. He was raised in Fort Lee, New Jersey. Levine is Jewish.

== Career ==
Levine began performing stand-up comedy at bar mitzvahs at age 12. After seeing him perform, Lisa Kudrow advised him that he should start auditioning in Manhattan.

When Levine began his acting career, he added the extra "M" to his name as there was already a Sam Levine registered with the Screen Actors Guild.

Levine was cast as a character in the sixth and final season of ABC's Lost in a small role that was written for him by Lost co-creator Damon Lindelof. Lindelof had frequently told Levine, "I'm going to write you something on the show". Levine played a clerk in the twelfth episode "Everybody Loves Hugo".

He regularly appears on Doug Benson's Doug Loves Movies podcasts and fills in as host of the Leonard Maltin Game when not taped in front of a live studio audience so Benson can play the game as a contestant. Benson has nicknamed Levine both "Samm the Ma'am Levine" and "Lil' Wolverine". Benson referred to 2011 as "The Summer of Samm" because Levine played the game so frequently and competitively.

Levine has been a regular participant on Kevin Pollak's Chat Show since the 1st episode on March 22, 2009, when he was the second guest. He was a guest on Episode 19 as well, just as the show was about to evolve to one guest for the duration of an episode.

In February 2014, Levine was voted 99th in VH1's Top 100 Child Stars.

Levine was a regular competitor on Collider's Movie Trivia Schmoedown where, on December 22, 2017, he won the singles championship. On May 15, 2018, he won the team championship.

== Personal life ==
In March 2020, editor and fellow Movie Trivia Schmoedown competitor Rachel Cushing announced that she and Levine were engaged. The couple married in May 2022.

== Filmography ==
=== Film ===
Year	Title	Role	Notes
2001	Wet Hot American Summer	Arty (voice)	Uncredited
2001	Not Another Teen Movie	Bruce	
2003	National Lampoon's Barely Legal	Roger	
2004	Club Dread	Dirk	
2006	Pulse	Tim	
2007	Sydney White	Spanky	
2009	Made for Each Other	Mike	
2009	Inglourious Basterds	Private First Class Hirschberg	
2009	I Love You, Beth Cooper	Convenience Store Clerk	
2010	Drones	Clark	
2010	Anderson's Cross	Evans	
2010	Columbus Circle	Bank Manager	
2013	Jobs	Apple Designer #1	
2013	Miss Dial	Pranked Caller	
2015	Sidewalk Traffic	Johnny Kaye	
2015	Vacation	Festival Dude Sam	Uncredited
2015	Promoted	Jacob Silver	
2015	The Night Is Young	Topher	
2017	Apple of My Eye	Apple's Handler	Uncredited
2017	WTF: World Thumbwrestling Federation	Marley Kaufmann	
2018	I'd Like to Be Alone Now	Kyle	
2019	Immortal	Warren	
2020	Adverse	Craig	
2024	City of Dreams	Nazarian	
TBA	Triumph of the Will	TBA	Post-production

=== Television ===
Year	Title	Role	Notes
1997	One Life to Live	Hector	1 episode
1998	The World of Beanie Babies	Himself	
1999	Strip Poker	—N/a	Writer
1999–2000	Freaks and Geeks	Neal Schweiber	18 episodes
2000	Life's Too Short	Caleb Kohler	
2000	Ed	Kevin Schwartz / Kid #1	2 episodes
2000	The Trouble with Normal	Keith Kegler	Episode: "Speech! Speech!"
2000	Spin City	Young Paul	Episode: "Lost and Found"
2000	Yes, Dear	Manager	Episode: "All I Want for Christmas Is My Dead Uncle's Cash"
2000	Freedom	Zak	Episode: "Lonewolf"
2001	Bette	Robb	Episode: "The Invisible Mom"
2001	Just Shoot Me!	Sid Greenberg	Episode: "Sid & Nina"
2001	The Steve Harvey Show	Arthur Rabinowitz	2 episodes
2001	Boston Public	Manny	Episode: "Chapter Twenty-Three"
2001	Undeclared	Books	2 episodes
2002	Raising Dad	Adam Travers	Episode: "The Math Problem"
2002	Maybe It's Me	Forrest DiRico	2 episodes
2002	What I Like About You	Sheldon	Episode: "Copy That"
2002	The Drew Carey Show	Jake	Episode: "Drew's Girl Friday"
2002	Homeward Bound	Stewart Roth	Television film
2002–2004	Fillmore!	Horace / Young Man / Store Employee #1 / Nicky (voices)	3 episodes
2003	That's So Raven	Marvin	Episode: "Saving Psychic Raven"
2003	That '70s Show	Lance Crawford	Episode: "Trampled Under Foot"
2003	Regular Joe	Sweaty	2 episodes
2003	The Mayor	Pecky	Television film
2004	Johnny Bravo	Klangor (voice)	Episode: "Mini JB/Back from the Future"
2004	I'm with Her	Rodney	Episode: "Drama Queen"
2004	Quintuplets	Hugo	Episode: "Date Night"
2004	Life as We Know It	Bernard Sachs	4 episodes
2005	Eve	Ben	Episode: "Moral Minority"
2005	How I Met Your Mother	Phil	Episode: "Okay Awesome"
2005–2006	Still Standing	Douglas	2 episodes
2006	My Name Is Earl	Tom	Episode: "The Professor"
2006	Entourage	Reggie	Episode: "One Day in the Valley"
2006	Veronica Mars	Samuel Horshack	Episode: "My Big Fat Greek Rush Week"
2006	Family Guy	Joey (voice)	Episode: "Saving Private Brian"
2009	Hank	Brandon	Episode: "Drag Your Daughter to Work Day"
2010	Lost	Clerk	Episode: "Everybody Loves Hugo"
2010	Yo Gabba Gabba!	Samm	Episode: "Flying"
2010	Vamped Out	Billy Goldborg	6 episodes
2010–2012	NCIS	NCIS Agent Cashier Fred Seymour	2 episodes
2011	90210	Moderator	Episode: "Nerdy Little Secrets"
2011	Modern Family	Josh	Episode: "Hit and Run"
2012	Breaking In	Henry Shaw	2 episodes
2012	The Aquabats! Super Show!	Pilgrim Boy	Episode: "Pilgrim Boy"
2012	Necessary Roughness	Josh Miller	Episode: "Mr. Irrelevant"
2013	TMI Hollywood	Various	Episode: "TMI's First Anniversary Show"
2013	Do No Harm	Josh Stern	11 episodes
2013	Liv and Maddie	Chambers	Episode: "Steal-a-Rooney"
2014	Person of Interest	Owen Matthews	Episode: "4C"
2014	Warehouse 13	Scott Mohr	Episode: "Endless"
2014	Selfie	Terrence	5 episodes
2015	Hell's Kitchen	Himself	Episode: "16 Chefs Compete"
2015	Kirby Buckets	Zorro	Episode: "All Hands on Dexter"
2015	Wet Hot American Summer: First Day of Camp	Arty (voice)	7 episodes
2015	Love Handles	Samm	Episode: "Vanilla"
2015–2018	Drunk History	Various	3 episodes
2016	Childrens Hospital	Chuggy Simple	Episode: "Doctor Beth"
2016	K.C. Undercover	Noah	Episode: "Catch Him If You Can"
2016	Mutt & Stuff	Johnny in Charge	Episode: "Amusement Bark"
2016	Crunch Time	Connor	6 episodes
2016	Comedy Bang! Bang!	Bearded Friend	Episode: "Kaley Cuoco Wears a Black Blazer and Slip on Sneakers"
2016–2018	Another Period	Chadwick / Men's Club Member	2 episodes
2017	Hawaii Five-0	Jeremy Holden	Episode: "Poniu I Ke Aloha"
2017	Wet Hot American Summer: Ten Years Later	Arty	5 episodes
2018	I'm Poppy	Johnny	Lead role
2018	Bobcat Goldthwait's Misfits & Monsters	Allan	Episode: "Mermaid"
2019	No Good Nick	Roger	2 episodes
2020	Wags to Riches	Reuben Hernandez-Finkelstein	
2021	The Neighborhood	Jerry	Episode: "Welcome to the Dad Band"
2022	Raven's Home	Newt Slackley	4 episodes
2023	Underdeveloped	Karl	6 episodes

=== Web ===
Year	Title	Role	Notes
2007	Derek and Simon: The Show	Sam	2 episodes
2009–2019	Kevin Pollak's Chat Show	Himself/Guest Host	Podcast
2016–2022	Movie Trivia Schmoedown	Himself / The Inglourious One	
