= Mors Praematura =

- Person of Interest episode
- Episode no.: Season 3 Episode 6
- Directed by: Helen Shaver
- Written by: David Slack
- Cinematography by: David Insley
- Editing by: Scott Powell
- Production code: 2J7606
- Original air date: October 29, 2013
- Running time: 44 minutes

Guest appearances
- Kirk Acevedo as Timothy Sloan; Leslie Odom Jr. as Peter Collier; Michael Esper as Jason Greenfield; Brian Wiles as Officer Mike Laskey; Donnie Keshawarz as Nick Breckenridge; Robert John Burke as Officer Patrick Simmons

Episode chronology
← Previous "Razgovor"	Next → "The Perfect Mark"

"Mors Praematura" (Latin for 'Untimely Death') is the 6th episode of the third season of the American television drama series Person of Interest. It is the 51st overall episode of the series and is written by Dan Dietz and directed by Helen Shaver. It aired on CBS in the United States and on CTV in Canada on October 29, 2013.

The series revolves around a computer program for the federal government known as "the Machine" that is capable of collating all sources of information to predict terrorist acts and to identify people planning them. A team, consisting of John Reese, Harold Finch and Sameen Shaw follow "irrelevant" crimes: lesser level of priority for the government. In the episode, Reese investigates Shaw's disappearance while Finch goes after an estate investigator who wants to unravel the mystery behind his brother's death. Meanwhile, Shaw is forced by Root to help her in doing some tasks for the Machine.

According to Nielsen Media Research, the episode was seen by an estimated 12.00 million household viewers and gained a 1.9/5 ratings share among adults aged 18–49. The episode received near critical acclaim, with critics praising the writing, character development, Acevedo's guest performance and building momentum.

== Plot ==
Reese (Jim Caviezel) enters Shaw's loft but does not find her there, but does find evidence of a taser. Meanwhile, Finch (Michael Emerson) has met the new number: Timothy Sloan (Kirk Acevedo), an estate investigator. Sloan specifically investigates belongings of people who have recently died without a will and finds their next-of-kin.

Finch follows Sloan to an apartment where he suspects he is stealing. However, Sloan reveals he is the foster brother of the owner, Jason Greenfield (Michael Esper), who died of a heroin overdose a few weeks ago. Jason was a hacker and lost contact until Sloan found out about his death. Sloan expresses doubt about Jason using drugs as he owned very expensive items in his house and despite his hacker status, he had no computer. Jason left behind a USB flash drive with a coded message that mentioned that he would be killed if he left a group.

Shaw (Sarah Shahi) wakes up in a car with Root (Amy Acker), who tells her that the Machine needs them to work together to help protect it. Shaw reluctantly agrees to help. The Machine gives them unexplained clues, like leaving an envelope on a park bench, delving in the sewers and entering a CIA safe house where Shaw knocks the agent out. Root then has Shaw act as a CIA operative with Root serving as a prisoner. Root is taken to a CIA black site.

Finch and Sloan visit one of Jason's storage units to find it empty. But with the use of UV lights, they discover a coded message in the walls. However, they are being watched by a camera and they nearly die when the unit closes and starts filling with gasoline. Reese saves them and they escape before the unit explodes. The team then discovers that one of the people involved is Peter Collier (Leslie Odom Jr.), a man they previously dealt with. Jason was part of Collier's group and became a highly respected hacker but when he tried to leave, Collier had him killed. The team must find a Running key cipher that Jason left that would be used to unravel the code.

Meanwhile, Laskey (Brian Wiles) collects money for HR from Mozorov, a Russian deli owner who pays them out of loyalty. However, he is reprimanded by Simmons (Robert John Burke) when they find that Mozorovhas skimmed money from them and so has him killed, and forces Laskey to bury the body. The next day, a traumatized Laskey talks to Carter (Taraji P. Henson), revealing his real name as Mikhail Lesnichy and that HR is infiltrating Russians into the Police, including himself. He also states that HR is collecting money for something unspecified.

Reese and Sloan check Jason's apartment and find the book with the running key. However, Collier's team arrives and kidnaps Sloan. Finch deciphers the code: Jason is alive and has turned himself in to the CIA but Collier's team will try to kill him. Jason is placed in the cell next to the one in which the Machine placed Root. They have a conversation, where Jason reveals that he helped Collier's group Vigilance, with Wayne Kruger, but the group decided to kill Kruger despite Jason's objections, which caused his concern for his role in the group. Root and Jason are taken to a transportation bus where Root untangles herself and starts freeing Jason.

Collier's group causes the transport bus to crash, but Reese and Shaw fight Collier's group. Root and Jason escape, using the envelope (which contains an earbud and a gun) and descend into the sewers. Root gives Jason money and a fake ID so he can make his escape to Cartagena, Colombia. She is confronted by Collier's crew but they are subsequently killed by Shaw. When Root affirms that the mission is over, Shaw knocks her unconscious. Collier holds Sloan at gunpoint and then meets with Reese. He then shoots Sloan in the femoral artery and escapes, forcing Reese to let Collier go while taking Sloan to the hospital.

When Sloan leaves the hospital, he receives a call from Jason, who thanks him for everything and promising to keep talking more regularly. Root is locked up in a section of the library with an ankle monitor and no access to the Machine. Root states that the Machine will be mad at Finch for doing this but Finch suggests that maybe this is where the Machine wants her to be.

== Reception ==
=== Viewers ===
In its original American broadcast, "Mors Praematura" was seen by an estimated 12.00 million household viewers and gained a 1.9/5 ratings share among adults aged 18–49, according to Nielsen Media Research. This means that 1.9 percent of all households with televisions watched the episode, while 5 percent of all households watching television at that time watched it. This was a 9% decrease in viewership from the previous episode, which was watched by 13.17 million viewers with a 2.2/6 in the 18-49 demographics. With these ratings, Person of Interest was the third most watched show on CBS for the night, behind NCIS: Los Angeles and NCIS, second on its timeslot and fourth for the night in the 18-49 demographics, behind NCIS: Los Angeles, NCIS, and The Voice.

With Live +7 DVR factored in, the episode was watched by 16.24 million viewers with a 2.9 in the 18-49 demographics.

=== Critical reviews ===
"Mors Praematura" received near critical acclaim from critics. Matt Fowler of IGN wrote in his verdict, "'Mors Praematura' gave us thrilling action, deadly intrigue and a spectacularly fun pairing between Root and Shaw. I'm very happy they went the 'uneasy alliance' route this time and didn't try to rehash the full animosity of last season. And look, Root even gets to be Finch's prisoner now! Tables effectively turned. Although there's nothing about her confinement that gives me the impression that she can't escape. Of course, not having The Machine in her ear might be a big obstacle to overcome."

Phil Dyess-Nugent of The A.V. Club gave the episode an "A" grade and wrote, "God, I love this show. No matter how bad you think things are, it'll always find a way to see your neurotic fears and raise them. To quote Jimmy James, Stephen Root’s character from NewsRadio, it's got more paranoid fantasies than Stephen King on crack. And it keeps moving, so that its take on the 24-hour-surveillance society never settles into a neat grouping of clear-cut good guys and clear-cut bad guys."
