= Last Call (Person of Interest) =

- Person of Interest episode
- Episode no.: Season 3 Episode 15
- Directed by: Jeff T. Thomas
- Written by: Dan Dietz
- Cinematography by: David Insley
- Editing by: Scott Powell
- Production code: 2J7615
- Original air date: February 25, 2014
- Running time: 44 minutes

Guest appearances
- Melissa Sagemiller as Sandra Nicholson; Gavin Stenhouse as Detective Jake Harrison; Kathleen McNenny as Gina Kincaid; David Andrew MacDonald as Ron Kincaid

Episode chronology
← Previous "Provenance"	Next → "RAM"

"Last Call" is the 15th episode of the third season of the American television drama series Person of Interest. It is the 60th overall episode of the series and is written by Dan Dietz and directed by Jeff T. Thomas. It aired on CBS in the United States and on CTV in Canada on February 25, 2014.

The series revolves around a computer program for the federal government known as "The Machine" that is capable of collating all sources of information to predict terrorist acts and to identify people planning them. A team, consisting of John Reese, Harold Finch and Sameen Shaw follow "irrelevant" crimes: lesser level of priority for the government. In the episode, the team must help a 9-1-1 call operator when she is threatened by a man to commit certain actions or he will kill a child. Meanwhile, Fusco decides to help a rookie on a case, which ends up connected with the 9-1-1 call operator. Despite being credited, Amy Acker does not appear in the episode.

According to Nielsen Media Research, the episode was seen by an estimated 11.00 million household viewers and gained a 1.8/5 ratings share among adults aged 18–49. The episode received generally positive reviews, with critics praising the "stressful" atmosphere of the episode although the lack of plot development received criticism.

The episode received a sequel, "Sotto Voce", in the show's fifth season.

== Plot ==
Finch (Michael Emerson) infiltrates a 9-1-1 call center, where their new number, Sandra Nicholson (Melissa Sagemiller), a 9-1-1 operator, works. Sandra is well respected in the call center for helping junior operators when they struggle to help callers. Meanwhile, a harried Fusco (Kevin Chapman) is approached for help by rookie detective Jake Harrison (Gavin Stenhouse), who is investigating the murder of Tara Cooke. He reluctantly agrees to look at the case.

Sandra receives a 9-1-1 call from a boy named Aaron, who hides in his closet when two thugs break in, but they find and kidnap him. An unknown person calls Sandra and instructs her to follow his orders or Aaron will die. His instructions include Sandra calling off the police, turning off the power generator at the call center and deleting all 9-1-1 calls from the past two days. Reese (Jim Caviezel) and Shaw (Sarah Shahi) check surveillance and find that the kidnappers are part of a Mexican cartel. Shaw intercepts a car that the caller's signal is triangulating from, but only discovers a phone with a relay. Finch deduces the caller is connecting multiple phones, making them impossible to trace in the time the team has.

As Sandra hesitates to delete the 9-1-1 calls on the server room, Finch enters and convinces her he's there to help. Sandra excuses herself while Finch begins investigating the 30,000 calls logged in the past two days. After deleting irrelevant calls, he then calls Fusco to help him narrow down the remainder. Fusco eventually realizes the caller is related to the Tara Cooke investigation, and both find that the caller is also the killer. When the caller discovers Finch is helping Sandra, he detonates a mini-bomb downtown as a warning. He gives Sandra 15 minutes to delete the calls or Aaron will be killed with a bomb vest.

Fusco and Harrison interrogate Tara's coworkers and eventually solve the mystery: she was murdered by her boss, and the family hired a cleaner to erase the 9-1-1 call she made in which she named her killer. When Fusco pressures the family to terminate the contract, the cleaner decides to kill both Aaron and Sandra to cover his tracks. A hitman appears in the call center and pursues Sandra and Finch while Reese and Shaw find Aaron's location and manage to deactivate the bomb. Finch and Sandra manage to overcome the hitman and knock him out. Finch later meets with Sandra and they watch Aaron playing baseball. He meets with Shaw and Reese when he is contacted by the caller, who states that Sandra and Aaron are no longer in danger but issues Finch with a warning about consequences.

== Reception ==
=== Viewers ===
In its original American broadcast, "Last Call" was seen by an estimated 11.00 million household viewers and gained a 1.8/5 ratings share among adults aged 18–49, according to Nielsen Media Research. This means that 1.8 percent of all households with televisions watched the episode, while 5 percent of all households watching television at that time watched it. This was a 11% decrease in viewership from the previous episode, which was watched by 12.35 million viewers with a 2.1/6 in the 18-49 demographics. With these ratings, Person of Interest was the third most watched show on CBS for the night, behind NCIS: Los Angeles and NCIS, second on its timeslot and eighth for the night in the 18-49 demographics, behind Chicago Fire, a Growing Up Fisher rerun, NCIS: Los Angeles, an About a Boy rerun, The Bachelor, NCIS, and The Voice.

With Live +7 DVR factored in, the episode was watched by 15.75 million viewers with a 2.9 in the 18-49 demographics.

=== Critical reviews ===
"Last Call" received generally positive reviews from critics. Matt Fowler of IGN gave the episode a "good" 7.7 out of 10 rating and wrote in his verdict, "Even though The Voice's actual voice sounded too strange and smug to feel like a real threat, I'll always welcome new recurring villains with open arms on this show. And since we have plenty of groups and organizations at the moment, it was nice to get a lone guy who takes contracts. And yes, the Season 1 Root comparisons are there. Also, it was about time the gang finally paid a visit to a 911 center and witnessed those people trying to do what Finch does, but on a crazy, high volume basis. A good, not great entry into the POI-verse."

Phil Dyess-Nugent of The A.V. Club gave the episode a "B" grade and wrote, "If the whole point of this episode was to add one more super-villain to the show's rogues' gallery, I'm not sure it was worth the trouble. Things get a little silly before the hour is up, and the rogues' gallery itself could use a little pruning."
