= Nothing to Hide (Person of Interest) =

- Person of Interest episode
- Episode no.: Season 3 Episode 2
- Directed by: Frederick E. O. Toye
- Written by: Erik Mountain
- Cinematography by: David Insley
- Editing by: Mark Conte
- Production code: 2J7602
- Original air date: October 1, 2013
- Running time: 44 minutes

Guest appearances
- David Alan Basche as Wayne Kruger; Clarke Peters as Alonzo Quinn; Leslie Odom Jr. as Peter Collier; Gary Basaraba as Stu Sommers; Brian Wiles as Officer Mike Laskey; Paul Urcioli as Barry Timmons

Episode chronology
← Previous "Liberty"	Next → "Lady Killer"

"'Nothing to Hide" is the 2nd episode of the third American television drama series Person of Interest season. It is the 47th overall episode of the series and is written by co-producer Erik Mountain and directed by Frederick E.O. Toye. It aired on CBS in the United States and on CTV in Canada on October 1, 2013.

The series revolves around a computer program for the federal government known as "the Machine" that is capable of collating all sources of information to predict terrorist acts and to identify people planning them. A team, consisting of John Reese, Harold Finch and Sameen Shaw follow "irrelevant" crimes: lesser level of priority for the government. In the episode, the team must watch over a company's CEO that specializes in getting data on individuals and sharing it with more people. Meanwhile, Carter meets her new partner, but he proves to be very naive. The title refers to the "Nothing to hide argument", which states that individuals have no reason to fear or oppose surveillance programs, unless they are afraid it will uncover their own illicit activities. Despite being credited, Amy Acker does not appear in the episode.

According to Nielsen Media Research, the episode was seen by an estimated 12.35 million household viewers and gained a 2.1/6 ratings share among adults aged 18–49. Critical reception was positive, with critics praising the case and the climax, although Carter's storyline received a more mixed response.

== Plot ==
Visiting Beecher's grave, Carter (Taraji P. Henson) talks with Beecher's godfather, Alonzo Quinn (Clarke Peters), who states that Elias' henchmen may be responsible for his death but Carter expresses her doubts. This prompts Quinn to consider that Carter may be a threat to HR while Carter calls on Fusco (Kevin Chapman) to investigate the police database for information on Beecher's murder.

The Machine produces a new number: Wayne Kruger (David Alan Basche), CEO of Lifetrace, which specializes in revealing members' privacy on their profile pages and selling it to various organizations. Reese (Jim Caviezel), Finch (Michael Emerson), and Shaw (Sarah Shahi) monitor Kruger's activities in the company, which is currently making a deal with another large retail company called Riverton. Reese and Shaw infiltrate one of Kruger's parties and see how someone uses a video to show Kruger's infidelity to his wife. They also discover that Kruger buries all type of negative publicity and legal issues that could impact the company.

Kruger starts seeing his life crumble as his assistant quits after finding an audio of Kruger making a sexist comment about her, Riverton pulls out of the deal after his recent controversies and finding he both had a criminal record, and at one point went bankrupt. The board of directors decide to suspend him. After an attempt on his life, Kruger leaves the building. His car is hacked and he crashes, so Reese rescues him and takes him to the library. Finch discovers that multiple of Lifetrace's victims have been receiving anonymous packages allowing them to take revenge on Kruger.

Carter begins her shift with her new partner, a rookie named Mike Laskey (Brian Wiles). Laskey proves to be very difficult to work with, mainly for his lack of preparation and constant disgust at the corpses. After a talk with Carter, Laskey gains more confidence on himself. At the precinct, Fusco enters the database to check on Beecher's case but he is denied access.

With Kruger's help, the team finds that a janitor in the company, Carl, is actually called Stu Sommers (Gary Basaraba), a man whose daughter was stalked and killed by her ex-boyfriend after he used Lifetrace to follow her. They find he has a background in engineering, which explains how he could hack the elevator, videos, and car. When he receives an e-mail from Riverton wanting to reconsider the deal, Kruger knocks Finch out and escapes to a hotel, despite the fact that Sommers already read the e-mail and is heading there. Kruger holds Sommers at gunpoint and has him enter the meeting with Riverton's vice president, Peter Collier (Leslie Odom Jr.). When Collier reveals that the deal was not being reconsidered after all, Kruger tries to kill Sommers but Sommers gets the gun. Reese arrives and convinces Sommers to drop the gun, as it won't do any honour to his daughter's memory.

Just then, Collier pulls out a gun and shoots both Reese and Kruger. He reveals to Sommers that he sent him and others the packages and allows him to go. He then talks to Kruger, blaming him for everything that people lost with their privacy, shoots him in the head, killing him, and escapes. Shaw arrives and help an injured Reese to stand up. They talk with Finch, who reports that Collier did not return to Riverton and fears what could happen next with Collier.

== Reception ==
=== Viewers ===
In its original American broadcast, "Nothing to Hide" was seen by an estimated 12.35 million household viewers and gained a 2.1/6 ratings share among adults aged 18–49, according to Nielsen Media Research. This means that 2.1 percent of all households with televisions watched the episode, while 6 percent of all households watching television at that time watched it. This was a slight decrease in viewership from the previous episode, which was watched by 12.44 million viewers with a 2.3/6 in the 18-49 demographics. With these ratings, Person of Interest was the third most watched show on CBS for the night, behind NCIS: Los Angeles and NCIS (TV series), second on its timeslot and seventh for the night in the 18-49 demographics, behind The Goldbergs, Chicago Fire, NCIS: Los Angeles, Agents of S.H.I.E.L.D., NCIS, and The Voice.

With Live +7 DVR factored in, the episode was watched by 16.43 million viewers with a 3.0 in the 18-49 demographics.

=== Critical reviews ===
"Nothing to Hide" received positive reviews from critics. Matt Fowler of IGN gave the episode a "great" 8 out of 10 and wrote in his verdict, "'Nothing to Hide' started off small but finished big. There were points during the episode, even indicated by Shaw, when I seriously wondered why I shouldn't just root for Kruger's tormenter to prevail. So, truthfully, after a while it became more fun to see Kruger's life unravel around him than watch Reese and Finch try to save him."

Phil Dyess-Nugent of The A.V. Club gave the episode an "A−" grade and wrote, "Person of Interest has offered up more than its fair share of blameless good people who are in desperate need of help. But the show is often at its best and most excitingly prickly when its heroes are repeatedly forced to take a moment to ask themselves and each other, 'Remind me why it's important that we protect this piece of shit?'"
