= Endgame (Person of Interest) =

- Person of Interest episode
- Episode no.: Season 3 Episode 8
- Directed by: Sylvain White
- Written by: Nic Van Zeebroeck & Michael Sopczynski
- Cinematography by: David Insley
- Editing by: Mark Conte
- Production code: 2J7608
- Original air date: November 12, 2013
- Running time: 44 minutes

Guest appearances
- Laz Alonso as Paul Carter; Clarke Peters as Alonzo Quinn; Morgan Spector as Peter Yogorov; David Valcin as Scarface; Nick Mennell as Nikolai Yurlov; Paul O'Brien as Judge Andrew Monahan; Robert John Burke as Officer Patrick Simmons; Enrico Colantoni as Carl Elias

Episode chronology
← Previous "The Perfect Mark"	Next → "The Crossing"

"Endgame" is the 8th episode of the third season of the American television drama series Person of Interest. It is the 53rd overall episode of the series and is written by Nic Van Zeebroeck & Michael Sopczynski and directed by Sylvain White. It aired on CBS in the United States and on CTV in Canada on November 12, 2013.

The series revolves around a computer program for the federal government known as "The Machine" that is capable of collating all sources of information to predict terrorist acts and to identify people planning them. A team, consisting of John Reese, Harold Finch and Sameen Shaw follow "irrelevant" crimes: lesser level of priority for the government. In the episode, Carter decides to go all out to end HR once and for all, planning to put the Russians against them and start a war. Despite being credited, Amy Acker does not appear in the episode.

According to Nielsen Media Research, the episode was seen by an estimated 12.60 million household viewers and gained a 2.0/6 ratings share among adults aged 18–49. The episode received critical acclaim, with critics highlighting Taraji P. Henson's acting, writing and ending.

== Plot ==
=== Flashbacks ===
In 2005, Carter (Taraji P. Henson) stars her career at the New York City Police Department when she runs into her ex-husband, Paul (Laz Alonso). Paul, an Army veteran, who is suffering from Post-traumatic stress disorder and has been told by Carter not to get close to their son Taylor until he seeks treatment. She later finds Paul at her house and both have a verbal fight before Paul loses his temper and destroys a lamp, forcing Carter to get him out of the house.

In 2008, Carter has been promoted to Detective and runs into Paul again. Paul has been going for treatment at Veterans Affairs and leaves Carter with his phone number in case she or Taylor need him.

=== Present day ===
The Machine has produced 38 numbers, all belonging to police officers that may be on HR's payroll. Reese (Jim Caviezel) and Fusco (Kevin Chapman) investigate a truck robbery which may be connected to Peter Yogorov (Morgan Spector). Yogorov meets with Simmons (Robert John Burke), where he refuses to pay an additional fee for protection, severing ties with HR.

Two days earlier, Carter meets with Quinn (Clarke Peters), where she says she will stop pursuing Cal Beecher's investigation. Actually, the meeting is a chance for Carter to clone Quinn's phone, as she knows he is HR's boss. She intercepts a call from Quinn, who expresses doubt about her statement and asks for her to be watched. Carter meets with Reese and asks him not to be around her for a while as HR may use this to their advantage. Carter then sends Elias (Enrico Colantoni) to meet with Yogorov, offering a partnership to take down HR and leaves behind a document with crucial information. Carter is revealed to be behind the attack and robbery on the truck, having been supplied guns by Shaw (Sarah Shahi), planning to incriminate HR in the robbery.

Yogorov calls Quinn, threatening to expose the whole organization if the truck is not returned. Carter then shoots at Quinn's office, planning to start a war between HR and the Russians. Reese and Finch (Michael Emerson) discover that Carter was the robber and also discover Quinn's role as the boss of HR. After her actions, Quinn starts having a lot of Yogorov's men arrested. Carter then shows up at Yogorov's house, and takes him to the station as it's the only safe place for him. She offers a deal to Yogorov where she will transfer his brother who is in jail to a safer place if he confesses to HR's criminal activities with the amount of evidence she collected, which he accepts.

Carter then tells Fusco of a safe deposit box that will contain all her evidence against HR and leaves. HR members prepare to execute the Russians when more police officers arrive and discover the cocaine in one of the cars, arresting both the HR members and the Russians. Carter then calls a judge to ask for an arrest warrant against Quinn. Unknown to her, the judge is on Quinn's payroll and notifies him of this immediately.

Before meeting the judge, Carter calls Paul, who has had Taylor with him during these events. She thanks him for everything and then talks briefly with Taylor. She arrives at the judge's home, only to find Quinn and HR members awaiting for her. She prepares to be executed but mentions that their conversation where Quinn confessed to Beecher's murder was recorded. Reese enters and shoots at many of HR's men with Quinn getting shot in the shoulder. Reese, Carter and Quinn exit the house where Reese has a shootout with one of the HR members before they flee the area. Simmons then uses the cruiser's Dashcam to get a photo of the three and tells the officer to spread it to other officers.

== Reception ==
=== Viewers ===
In its original American broadcast, "Endgame" was seen by an estimated 12.60 million household viewers and gained a 2.0/6 ratings share among adults aged 18–49, according to Nielsen Media Research. This means that 2.0 percent of all households with televisions watched the episode, while 6 percent of all households watching television at that time watched it. This was a 7% increase in viewership from the previous episode, which was watched by 11.79 million viewers with a 1.9/6 in the 18-49 demographics. With these ratings, Person of Interest was the third most watched show on CBS for the night, behind NCIS: Los Angeles and NCIS, third on its timeslot and sixth for the night in the 18-49 demographics, behind Agents of S.H.I.E.L.D., Chicago Fire, NCIS: Los Angeles, NCIS, and The Voice.

With Live +7 DVR factored in, the episode was watched by 17.09 million viewers with a 3.1 in the 18-49 demographics.

=== Critical reviews ===
"Endgame" received critical acclaim from critics. Matt Fowler of IGN wrote in his verdict, "'Endgame,' for better or worse, didn't provide us with the big death that it seemed to be setting up, but - man oh man - it was a good, world-shaking episode. With Carter going rogue and pulling a few choice pages out of Reese's black ops book."

Phil Dyess-Nugent of The A.V. Club gave the episode an "A−" grade and wrote, "Always changing, recharging, and finding new twists to play on a premise that didn’t look as if it could sustain that many of them, Person of Interest is heading into its final batch of episodes of 2013 with a full head of steam."
