= Manuel Billeter =

Swiss-American cinematographer

Manuel Billeter is a Swiss-born, New York-based cinematographer. Billeter studied film at Freie Universität Berlin, and taught at the New York Film Academy.

His television work includes Orange is the New Black, Law and Order, Person of Interest, Ozark, Marvel's Jessica Jones, Luke Cage, and Iron Fist, Inventing Anna, and The Gilded Age. Many of these productions are notable for their use of multiple cinematographers, resulting in what some critics see as "inconsistent tone" but others see as "unique and intriguing". Billeter, in particular, is known for employing "dark" imagery, especially when working with HDR.

"When you go from SDR to HDR, you’re looking at a 600-800 per cent increase in the range of light that can be displayed. And that’s why Billeter believes the move towards HDR is going to be bigger and more significant than it was from HD to 4K."

As Director of Photography for the highly-anticipated film Cat Person, which premiered at Sundance in 2023, Billeter's "visual language" has been recognized by critics.
