= Stephen McEveety =

American film producer (born 1954)

Stephen Mark "Steve" McEveety (born November 4, 1954) is an American film producer with decades of experience in senior positions in the entertainment industry. He is the nephew of director Bernard McEveety.

McEveety is one of six children, and attended Notre Dame High School and Loyola Marymount University. He and his wife Susie have four children. As a child, Steve McEveety appeared in episodes of the TV series' Gunsmoke, My Three Sons, and Star Trek ("Miri", 1966). Later, he worked as an assistant director and production manager.

McEveety worked many years at Mel Gibson's Icon Productions where he executive produced What Women Want, Payback, Anna Karenina, Immortal Beloved, The Man Without a Face and Braveheart, the last of which gained ten Academy Award nominations and received five Oscars. McEveety produced The Passion of the Christ, Airborne, which he also wrote, as well as 187, Paparazzi, and We Were Soldiers.

After completing an exclusive producing deal with Icon, McEveety partnered with David Segel, John Shepherd and Todd Burns to launch Mpower Pictures. The company's first release was the Toronto Award Winning Bella. McEveety produced An American Carol, written & directed by David Zucker, and The Stoning of Soraya M., written & directed by Cyrus Nowrasteh, that took 2nd Runner-up at the 2009 Toronto Film Festival. Through Mpower Pictures McEveety also produced the movie Snowmen (October 2011), which won the Tribeca Film Festival Audience Award, Runner-up, the Dallas International Film Festival Audience Award, the TIFF Sprockets Golden Sprocket Award and the Heartland Crystal Heart Award. Most recently, McEveety produced Machine Gun Preacher with Mpower Pictures, in association with a number of other companies.

In 2015, McEveety went on to produce Man Down, directed by Dito Montiel, starring Shia LaBeouf, Gary Oldman, and Kate Mara. It was released by Lionsgate in late 2016.

== Filmography ==
He was a producer in all films unless otherwise noted.

=== Film ===
| Year | Film | Credit |
|---|---|---|
| 1991 | Hot Shots! | Associate producer |
| 1993 | The Man Without a Face | Executive producer |
| 1993 | Airborne | |
| 1994 | Immortal Beloved | Executive producer |
| 1995 | Braveheart | Executive producer |
| 1997 | Anna Karenina | Executive producer |
| 1997 | One Eight Seven | |
| 1999 | Payback | Executive producer |
| 2000 | What Women Want | Executive producer |
| 2002 | We Were Soldiers | |
| 2004 | The Passion of the Christ | |
| 2004 | Paparazzi | |
| 2006 | Bella | Executive producer |
| 2008 | The Stoning of Soraya M. | |
| 2008 | An American Carol | |
| 2010 | Snowmen | |
| 2015 | Man Down | |
| 2019 | The Devil Has a Name | |

Second unit director or assistant director

| Year | Film | Role |
|---|---|---|
| 1980 | Herbie Goes Bananas | Second assistant director |
| 1981 | The Devil and Max Devlin | Second assistant director |
| 1981 | Zorro, The Gay Blade | Second assistant director |
| 1981 | Force: Five | Second assistant director |
| 1983 | Something Wicked This Way Comes | First assistant director: Special effects |
| 1985 | Baby: Secret of the Lost Legend | First assistant director |
| 1985 | Real Genius | First assistant director |
| 1985 | The Trip to Bountiful | First assistant director |
| 1988 | 18 Again! | First assistant director |
| 1989 | Blood Red | First assistant director |

Production manager

| Year | Film | Role |
|---|---|---|
| 1985 | The Trip to Bountiful | Unit production manager |
| 1990 | Flatliners | Unit production manager |
| 1990 | Welcome Home, Roxy Carmichael | Production manager |
| 1991 | Hot Shots! | Unit production manager |
| 1992 | Forever Young | Unit production manager |

Visual effects

| Year | Film | Role |
|---|---|---|
| 1979 | The Black Hole | Production assistant: Miniatures unit |
| 1982 | Tron | Effects unit manager |

As writer

| Year | Film |
|---|---|
| 1993 | Airborne |

Thanks

| Year | Film | Role |
|---|---|---|
| 2015 | Little Boy | The producers wish to thank the following for their assistance |

=== Television ===
Second unit director or assistant director

| Year | Title | Role | Notes |
|---|---|---|---|
| 1979 | The Sacketts | Second assistant director | Television film |
| 1985 | An Early Frost | First assistant director | Television film |
| 1986 | The Last Days of Frank and Jesse James | First assistant director | Television film |
| 1986 | George Washington II: The Forging of a Nation | First assistant director | Television film |
| 1988 | Street of Dreams | First assistant director | Television film |

As an actor

| Year | Title | Role | Notes |
|---|---|---|---|
| 1964 | The Lieutenant | Victor | |
| 1966 | Star Trek: The Original Series | Redheaded Boy | S1:E8, "Miri" |
| 1965−66 | Gunsmoke | Boy Young Moreland Boy | Uncredited |
| 1967 | Cimarron Strip | 1st Boy | |
| 1964−68 | My Three Sons | Boy Second Boy Kenny | Uncredited |

Production manager

| Year | Title | Role | Notes |
|---|---|---|---|
| 1987 | Thirtysomething | Unit production manager | |
| 1987 | Right to Die | Production manager | Television film |
| 1989 | The Revenge of Al Capone | Production manager | Television film |
