= Brian Tetsuro Ivie =

American filmmaker

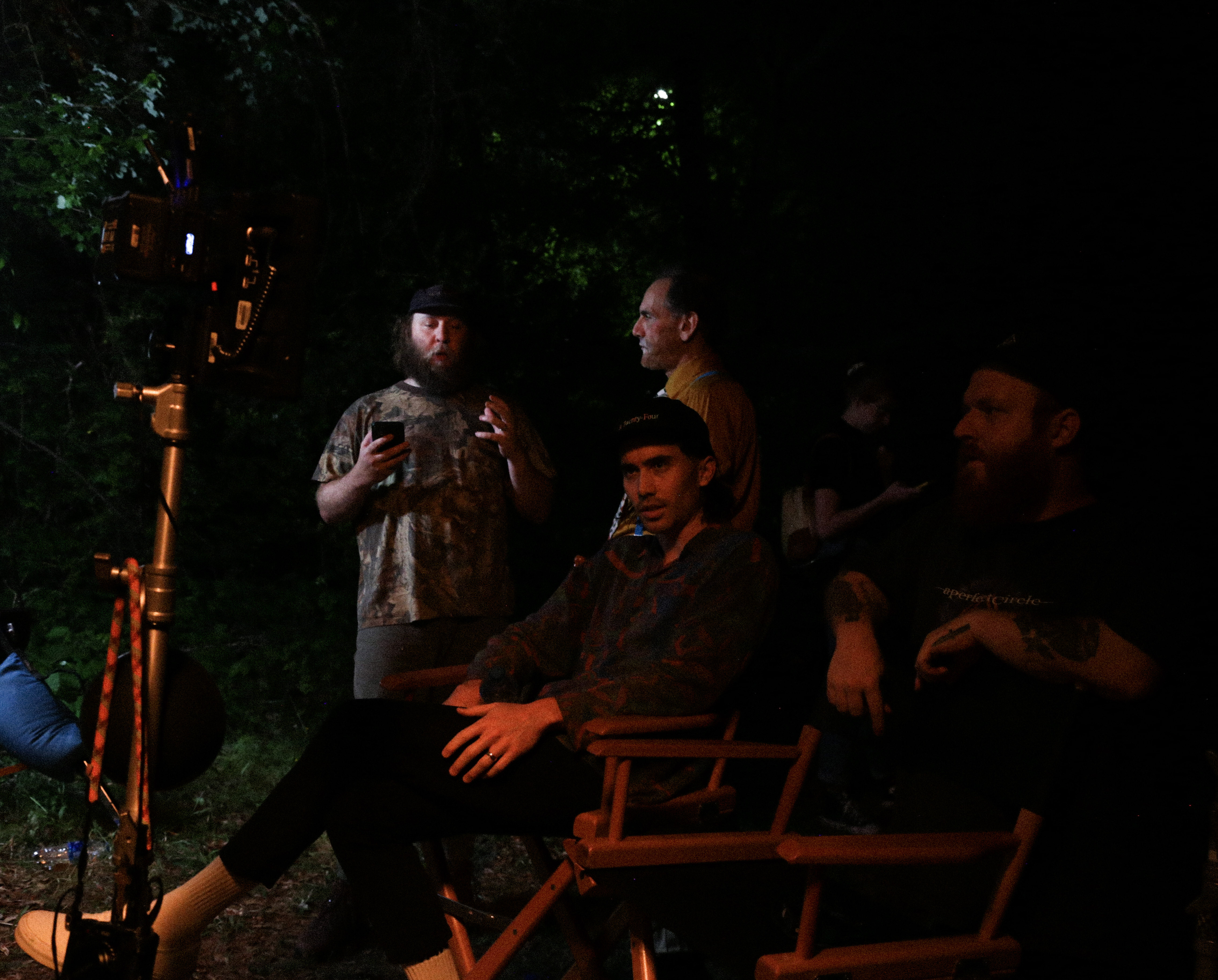
- Ivie on set in 2022.
- Born: Brian Tetsuro Ivie; September 27, 1990 (age 36); Glendale, California
- Education: USC School of Cinematic Arts
- Known for: Documentary, producing, film
- Notable work: The Drop Box (2015); Emanuel (2019); Wildcat (2023); Anima (2026 film) (2026)
- Spouse: Amanda Ivie (m. 2015)
- Children: Hadden Ivie, London Ivie
- Website: briantetsuroivie.com

Brian Tetsuro Ivie (born September 27, 1990, in Glendale, California) is a Japanese-American filmmaker, film producer and documentarian. He is the writer and director of the forthcoming science fiction road film, Anima, starring Sydney Chandler and Takehiro Hira.

Alongside his directing work, Ivie is known for executive producing such independent films as, Wildcat, directed by Ethan Hawke, Concessions starring Michael Madsen and Josh Hamilton, Isle Child, starring Ethan Hwang and Ben Wang, and The Queen of Basketball, winner of the Academy Award for Best Documentary Short Film. He is also a former creative producer for Stephen Curry's Unanimous Media.

== Career ==
Ivie studied film and television at the University of Southern California, where he also began producing his first documentary feature, The Drop Box, the story of a South Korean pastor, who rescues children through a small "hatch" built into the wall of his home. The film was later released by Fathom Events.

After graduation, Ivie signed to Creative Artists Agency, and would go on to produce and direct Emanuel, the story of forgiveness following a mass shooting, along with executive producers Viola Davis, Mariska Hargitay, and Stephen Curry, & release it to critical acclaim on the fourth anniversary of the shooting. The film made its television debut on Starz. Ivie is a frequent collaborator of actor and producer John Shepherd of the Friday the 13th horror franchise.

In 2019, it was announced that Ivie would write the Kirk Franklin biopic for producer Devon Franklin and Sony Pictures.

In 2021, Ivie joined Stephen Curry's Unanimous Media as an in-house creative producer, overseeing film, television, and documentary projects for worldwide distribution. In October 2021, Ivie and Unanimous released the documentary short film, Cancer Alley. The film, which tells the story of the most contaminated place in America and those who live there, was awarded a Vimeo Staff Pick, along with a Nowness Pick for the month of October. A feature film is underway with Stephen Curry executive producing.

In March 2022, it was announced that Ivie would co-executive produce, The Queen of Basketball, alongside Curry and fellow USC alum Ben Proudfoot. The sports-themed film, also executive produced by Shaquille O'Neal, was awarded the 2022 Academy Award for Best Documentary Short Film. In September 2023, it was also announced that Ivie had executive-produced the narrative drama, Wildcat, a biopic directed by Ethan Hawke, and starring Maya Hawke, Laura Linney, and Cooper Hoffman, among others. The film made its world premiere at the 2023 Telluride Film Festival. It would later premiere on the Criterion Channel.

In June 2025, Deadline broke the news that Tetsuro Ivie would make his narrative feature debut as the writer and director of the forthcoming science fiction road movie, Anima, starring Sydney Chandler and Takehiro Hira of the Shogun TV series. It was later announced that Tom McCarthy, Lili Taylor, Marin Ireland, and Maria Dizzia had joined the cast.

In February 2026, Deadline again broke the story that Anima would make its world premiere at the 2026 SXSW Film and TV Festival.

== Personal life ==
Ivie, who is half-Japanese, was raised in Orange County, California and began making movies at a young age. His grandmother, Marian Tanabe, formerly Umeda, was interned at the Rohwer War Relocation Center during World War II.

Ivie is a non-denominational Christian and his work often reflects his beliefs.
