= David Segel =

American film producer

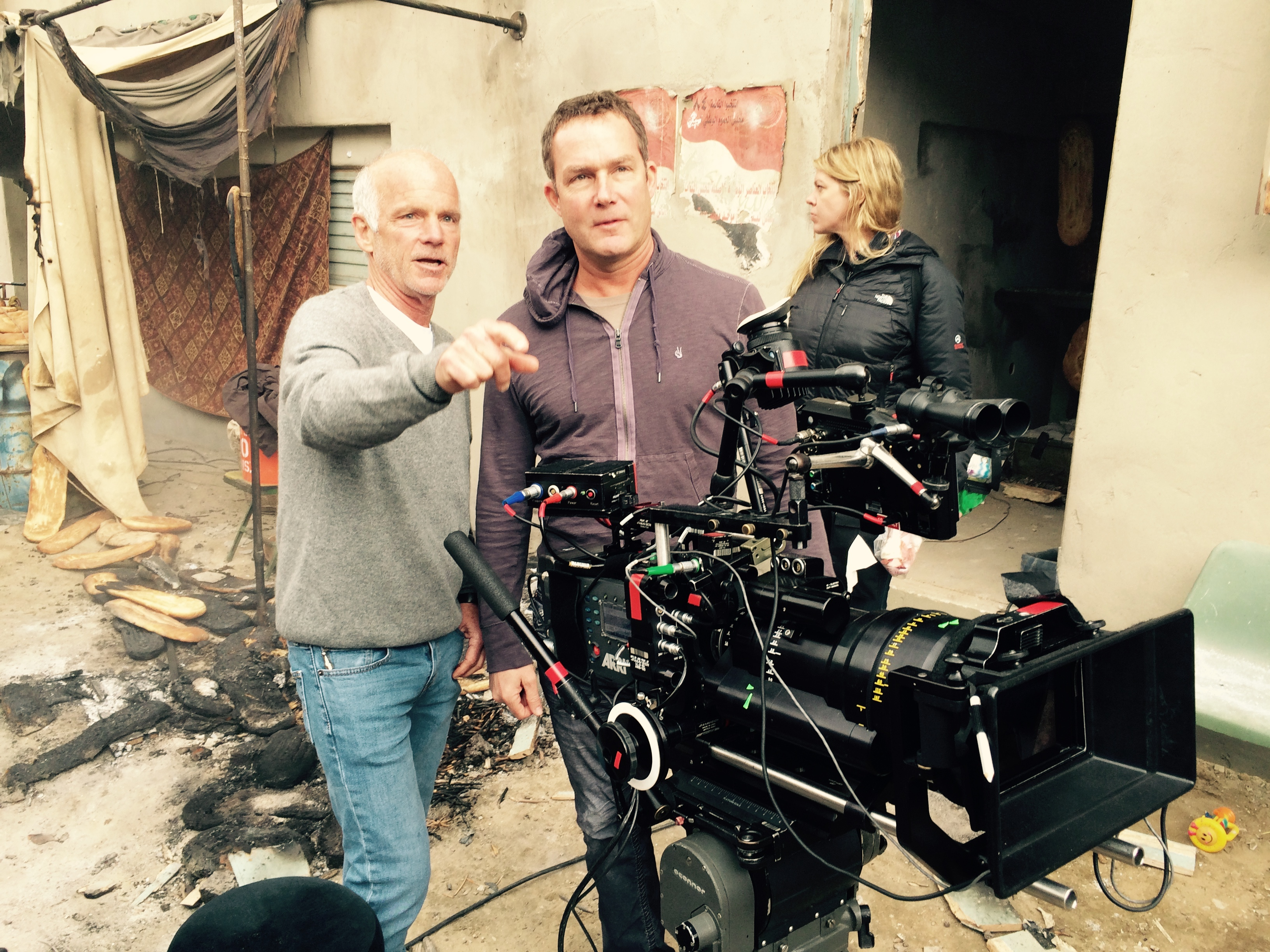
- Segel (right) with producer, Steve McEveety on the set of Man Down
- Born: April 10, 1964 (age 62)
- Education: Yale University(B.A.)
- Occupations: Chairman of Mako Global; CEO of SGL; Executive Producer, Mpower Pictures
- Website: segelgroup.com

David Alexander Segel (born April 10, 1964) is an American businessman, investor and philanthropist. Segel is a founding partner at Mako Global, Mpower Pictures and Structured Data Intelligence, creator of the Video Genome Project.

== Early life and education ==
Segel grew up in Connecticut, Chicago and New York, graduating from Yale University in 1986 with a B.A. in Physics and Philosophy. In 1992, Segel moved to London, England, where he lived for 16 years before returning to the US in 2008.

== Career ==
Segel began his career in New York as an options market maker and open outcry trader. Segel has traded as a member of the Coffee Sugar Cocoa Exchange, the Pacific Stock Exchange, the Chicago Board Options Exchange, London International Financial Futures and Options Exchange, and the Eurex Exchange. In 1999, Segel founded a London-based derivatives trading firm Mako Global, a leader in market making of pricing and risk in stocks, bonds, commodities and financial exchange derivatives across major markets.

Segel began investing in media interests in 2007, founding Mpower Pictures with Steve McEveety, John Shepherd and Todd Matthew Burns.

Segel has served as Producer and Executive Producer on several motion pictures. Segel's credits include executive producer for Man Down and The Drop Box (2015), as well as executive producer of The Stoning of Soraya M. (2008), which won the Los Angeles Film Festival "Audience Award for Best Narrative Feature" and producer of the film Snowmen (2011). In 2014 Segel launched Telescope Mag, a digital-only magazine and website, nominated by the International Digital Magazine Awards for "Specialty Magazine of the Year".

Segel co-founded Structured Data Intelligence with Xavier Kochhar and created The Video Genome Project which "...discovers, ingests, refines and understands the component data and metadata elements of film, television, and online video records." In 2016, The Video Genome Project was acquired by Hulu.

== Personal life ==
Segel founded The Promise Fund, managed through National Christian Foundation, to promote positive social values. In 2010, he completed an expedition through the Northwest Passage, navigating from East to West in an open Rigid Inflatable Boat (RIB) with adventurer Bear Grylls and traveling 2500 km from Baffin Island to the Beaufort Sea.
