= Mpower Pictures =

- Company type: Limited Liability Company
- Industry: Motion pictures
- Founded: Los Angeles, California, US (2007)
- Headquarters: Los Angeles, California, US
- Key people: David Segel, Chairman of the Board; Stephen McEveety, CEO; John Shepherd, President; Todd Matthew Burns, COO/Legal Counsel
- Website: www.mpowerpictures.com

Mpower Pictures is the production company of David Segel, Stephen McEveety, John Shepherd, and Todd Burns.

Mpower Pictures was launched with Bella (2006), winner of the Toronto Film Festival People's Choice Award, produced in association with Metanoia Films.

Since then, Mpower Pictures has produced a number of award-winning features for theatrical distribution including An American Carol, The Stoning of Soraya M. and Snowmen.

== Film and television productions ==
Mpower Pictures has been actively developing and producing film content for theatrical distribution since 2007 as well as television content since early 2010.

=== Film productions ===
- Man Down (2016)
- The Drop Box (2015)
- Irreplaceable (2014)
- Machine Gun Preacher (2012) (as financing production company)
- Snowmen (2011)
- The Stoning of Soraya M. (2010)
- As We Forgive (2009)
- An American Carol (2008)
- The Star of Bethlehem (2007)
- Bella (2006)

=== TV productions ===
- Vlad (In Development)

== Awards and recognition ==
- 2006 Toronto Film Festival, People's Choice Award (Bella)
- 2008 Toronto Film Festival, People's Choice Award, Runner-up (The Stoning of Soraya M.)
- 2009 Los Angeles Film Festival, Audience Award (The Stoning of Soraya M.)
- 2010 Image Awards, Outstanding Foreign Motion Picture (The Stoning of Soraya M.)
- 2010 Tribeca Film Festival, Audience Award, Runner-up (Snowmen)
- 2011 Dallas International Film Festival, Audience Award (Snowmen)
- 2012 Golden Globe Awards, Nomination for Best Original Song, “The Keeper” (Machine Gun Preacher)
