= An American Carol =

2008 film by David Zucker

- Theatrical release poster
- Directed by: David Zucker
- Written by: David Zucker; Myrna Sokoloff; Lewis Friedman
- Produced by: David Zucker; Stephen McEveety; John Shepherd; Todd Matthew Burns; Diane Hendricks
- Starring: Kevin Farley; Kelsey Grammer; Leslie Nielsen; Trace Adkins; Robert Davi; Geoffrey Arend; Serdar Kalsin; Jon Voight
- Cinematography: Brian Baugh
- Edited by: Vashi Nedomansky
- Music by: James L. Venable
- Production company: Mpower Pictures
- Distributed by: Vivendi Entertainment
- Release date: October 3, 2008
- Running time: 83 minutes
- Country: United States
- Language: English
- Budget: $20 million
- Box office: $7 million

An American Carol (released as Big Fat Important Movie in other territories) is a 2008 American satirical comedy film directed by David Zucker and written by Zucker, Myrna Sokoloff and Lewis Friedman. Using the framework of Charles Dickens's 1843 novella A Christmas Carol, the film follows liberal filmmaker Michael Malone (a parody of Michael Moore) as he is visited by three spirits to teach him the importance of Independence Day. The film satirizes liberalism in the United States, with focus on Moore's documentaries. It stars Kevin Farley as Malone, alongside an ensemble supporting cast that includes Kelsey Grammer, Leslie Nielsen, Trace Adkins, Robert Davi, and Jon Voight.

Theatrically released on October 3, 2008, by Vivendi Entertainment, An American Carol received negative reviews from most critics, who found the film's humor and satire to be ineffective. It also was a box office bomb that grossed only $7 million against a $20 million budget. This marked the last collaboration between David Zucker and Leslie Nielsen before the latter's death in 2010.

== Plot ==
Left-wing activist and filmmaker Michael Malone campaigns to end the celebration of the Fourth of July holiday. Malone holds pronounced anti-American views and truculently argues that America's past and present are both offensive and therefore should not be celebrated. He has finished another film entitled Die, You American Pigs! and just won the Leni Riefenstahl Award at the MooveAlong.org awards. They rush Malone off the stage before he can give his entire speech and his trophy is remarkably small, insignificant—and turns out to be a keychain. Then they start televising the program and give out the Award for "Best Film Director" overall. Malone is already working on another anti-American film called Fascist America.

On the evening of July 3, Malone watches a speech from President John F. Kennedy and mistakenly interprets the speech to mean avoiding war at any cost. President Kennedy rises out of the television set, corrects Malone regarding the intent of the speech, and informs him that he will be visited by three spirits.

The following morning, Malone is visited by General George S. Patton (Kelsey Grammer), who shows him an alternate United States where slavery still exists because Abraham Lincoln (founder of the Republican Party) chose not to fight the Civil War. Malone later sees George Washington (Jon Voight) who gives a passionate speech about God's gift of freedom and the price many people pay for others to have it. Malone is visited by the angel of death (Trace Adkins), who takes him to a future Los Angeles completely taken over by radical Islamists. He is then taken to the ruins of his hometown in Michigan, which has been destroyed by a nuclear bomb planted by Al Qaeda. In a mortuary, Malone learns that he will be killed in this attack, leaving nothing behind but his trademark hat and "big ass". Facing his death, Malone pleads for his life with the Angel, promising to change. But Aziz, a Middle Easterner Malone had interviewed, is actually a terrorist who will bomb a July 4 rally along with his underlings Ahmed and Fayed. When Fayed and Ahmed learn they are going to be detonated along with the planned bomb, they figure their slim chance of survival is by seeking out Malone.

Later, Malone arrives at an anti-Fourth of July protest rally and publicly renounces his former views. This triggers an outraged mob from which he is rescued by American servicemen. Meeting up with Malone, Ahmed and Fayed defuse their own bomb, thus sparing the people at the anti-Independence Day rally and resulting in the capture of the terrorist Aziz. Safe inside a country music concert, the three are formally welcomed to "the real America" by Trace Adkins (this time as himself). A reformed Malone then goes to a Navy base to see his nephew Josh off to the Persian Gulf. He tells Josh how very proud he is of him and promises to look in on his wife and family during his deployment. In the final scene, Malone now decides to make films he feels people would appreciate, as well as Fayed and Ahmed as part of the crew, who have been pardoned for foiling the bombing. Malone is last seen working on a biographical film about President Kennedy.

== Cast ==
- Kevin Farley as Michael Malone, a satirical caricature of documentary filmmaker Michael Moore
- Kelsey Grammer as General George S. Patton
- Robert Davi as Aziz
- Sammy Sheik as Fayed
- Geoffrey Arend as Mohammed
- Jon Voight as President George Washington
- James Woods as Todd Grosslight
- Chriss Anglin as President John F. Kennedy
- Leslie Nielsen as Grandpa / Osama bin Nielsen
- Jillian Murray as Heather
- Dennis Hopper as Judge Clarence Henderson
- Kevin Sorbo as George Mulrooney
- Travis Schuldt as Josh
- Trace Adkins as the Angel of Death / Himself
- Bill O'Reilly as Himself
- David Alan Grier as Rastus Malone (Michael's slave)
- Atticus Shaffer as Timmy
- Gary Coleman as Slave
- Fred Travalena as President Jimmy Carter
- Vicki Browne as Rosie O'Connell, a satirical caricature of comedian Rosie O'Donnell

Paris Hilton, Simon Rex, Zachary Levi, John O'Hurley and Mary Hart make cameo appearances.

== Production ==
In February 2008, Kelsey Grammer was initially announced as the star playing a contemporary take on Scrooge. In July 2008, the film was picked up for distribution by Vivendi.

== Marketing ==
An American Carol was strongly promoted by prominent Republicans and conservative personalities such as Rush Limbaugh, Sean Hannity, Glenn Beck and Mark Levin. On October 3, 2008, actors Kevin Farley and Kelsey Grammer appeared on the Fox News program The O'Reilly Factor to promote the film, particularly in light of the guest appearance of show host Bill O'Reilly in the film. An American Carol has also been described by newspapers such as the Dallas Morning News as being "for the right wing". The American Conservative reported, "The movie has been promoted by bloggers on National Review Online. The Leadership Institute, an activist group that maintains contact with College Republicans nationwide, urged its charges to see the movie on opening weekend, even handing out tickets to its interns."

== Reception ==
=== Box office ===
An American Carol which opened on 1,639 screens nationwide, finished ninth at the box office that week, with a gross of $3.8 million, or a per-screen average of $2,325. For its second weekend, An American Carol had a 58.8 percent drop in box office receipts and dropped to #15, grossing $1,505,000 at 1,621 theaters or $928 per screen.

The film faded in the box office in its third weekend dropping 73.8 percent and finishing #21 at 599 theaters grossing $365,000 or $609 per screen. In its fourth weekend, it dropped to #41 at 109 theaters grossing $60,000 or $550 per screen.

As of October 2009, An American Carol had grossed $7 million after having a production budget of $20 million.

In an interview with National Review Online, Zucker had suggested a sequel as his next possible project, but later said that he was done making conservative comedies. Zucker stated that the audience for this type of film is one who waits for it to be available on DVD.

=== Critical response ===
Based on 48 reviews collected by Rotten Tomatoes, An American Carol has an 13% approval rating from critics, with an average score of 3.3/10. The website's critics consensus reads: "An American Carol suffers not so much from its perceived political bias, but from the fact that it simply is not very funny." On Metacritic, which assigns a rating out of 100 to reviews from mainstream critics, the film has received an average score of 20, based on 12 reviews. The film had no advance screenings for critics. Director David Zucker said the studio did not believe the film would get a fair hearing due to its conservative political viewpoint, and had been "advised that most reviewers don't agree with the politics".

Dr. Hfuhruhurr, a conservative film critic for Ain't it Cool News, said the film featured "ingenious comedy that we remember from Airplane!" and was "funny and inventive." Kathleen Parker of The Washington Post Writers Group described the film as "[not] The Best Movie You Ever Saw, but it's something. It’s radical in its assault on the left wing; it's brave given the risk of peer ridicule and the potential for career suicide. And it's funny — if you like that sort of thing. Generally, I don’t." Michael Brendan Doherty of The American Conservative considered the movie to be funny "in parts", but concluded that "Far from lampooning the Left, "Carol" insults conservatives by presuming that they are so simple as to be won over by fat jokes and flatulence. But the audience, imagining itself to be persecuted by Hollywood, is so grateful to be flattered by Zucker and company that they chuckle obediently at every cheap laff." Steven Rea of The Philadelphia Inquirer gave the movie one star out of five, called it "jaw-droppingly awful," and "about as not-funny as a comedy can get."

On September 5, 2008, Michael Moore was a guest on Larry King Live and was shown a clip from the film where Malone (while lying down on his bed, drinking a Big Gulp and watching archival footage of JFK's inaugural address) is startled by Kennedy, who materializes out of Malone's television screen, and confronts him on his misguided views of American history. Moore said that he was vaguely familiar with the film, and then jokingly said he thought that Viggo Mortensen should be portraying him. When King asked him his opinion, Moore shrugged and said, "I hope it's funny."

== Home media ==
The film was released on DVD and Blu-ray Disc on December 30, 2008, by Vivendi Entertainment.

It includes a full length audio commentary by David Zucker and Kevin Farley along with several scenes and footage cut from the theatrical release.

== See also ==
- Adaptations of A Christmas Carol
- List of ghost films
