= Synapse (film) =

- Theatrical release poster
- Directed by: Kenlon Clark
- Written by: Adam G. Simon
- Produced by: Brian Brosnan; Pete Brosnan
- Starring: Adam G. Simon; Sophina Brown; Henry Simmons; Joshua Alba; Charley Boon; Will Rubio
- Music by: Christian Davis
- Production companies: Los Angeles Center Studios; Hollywood Locations
- Release date: December 15, 2015 (United States)
- Running time: 90 minutes
- Country: United States
- Language: English

Synapse is a science fiction thriller directed by music video director Kenlon Clark. The screenplay was written by Adam G. Simon who also penned the original story and screenplay for Man Down. Simon also stars in the film alongside Sophina Brown, Henry Simmons, Joshua Alba, Charley Boon and Will Rubio. The sound design for the film was done by Emmy Award winning sound designer Michael Archacki and the score was created by Christian Davis.

Synapse is the first theatrical content produced by Los Angeles Center Studios and Hollywood Locations.

== Plot ==
The film takes places in a future where a bio tech narcotic has become the drug of choice for addicts and dealers. “Mems” as they are called, allows the user to download memories provided by “Mem Farmers.” The story follows an addicted memory dealer Nathan Stafford as he is chased relentlessly by federal narcotics agents bent on keeping the secrets he has locked in his mind hidden.

== Cast ==
- Adam G. Simon as Nathan Stafford
- Sophina Brown as Aamina McDavitt
- Henry Simmons as Agent 805
- Joshua Alba as Frank McDavitt
- Charley Boon as Agent 702
- Will Rubio as Freddy
