= List of Mexican actors =

This is an alphabetical list of notable Mexican actors.

== A ==
- Alfredo Adame
- Rafael Amaya
- Armando Araiza
- Raúl Araiza
- Raúl Araiza (director)
- Alexis Ayala

== B ==
- Kuno Becker
- Augusto Benedico
- Bruno Bichir
- Demián Bichir
- Odiseo Bichir
- Victorio Blanco
- Hector Bonilla
- Claudio Brook

== C ==
- Alejandro Camacho
- Jaime Camil
- Eduardo Capetillo
- Guillermo Capetillo
- René Casados
- Fernando Ciangherotti
- Fernando Colunga
- Joaquín Cordero

== D ==
- Leonardo Daniel
- Arath de la Torre
- Eric del Castillo
- Aarón Díaz

== E ==
- José Ángel Espinoza
- Alberto Estrella

== F ==
- Emilio Fernández
- Pedro Fernández
- Juan Ferrara
- Omar Fierro

== G ==
- Andrés García
- Sergio Goyri
- Rogelio Guerra
- Jorge Antonio Guerrero

== I ==
- Mauricio Islas

== J ==
- Camila Jaber
- Sergio Jiménez

== L ==
- Ernesto Laguardia
- Imanol Landeta
- Manuel Landeta
- Valentino Lanús
- Sebastián Ligarde
- Ariel Lopez Padilla
- Ignacio Lopez Tarso
- Diego Luna

== M ==
- Armando Manzanero
- Jorge Martinez Colorado
- Ricardo Montalbán
- Pablo Montero

== N ==
- Victor Noriega

== O ==
- Manuel Ojeda

== P ==
- Roberto Palazuelos
- Eduardo Palomo
- Arturo Peniche
- Salvador Pineda
- Jorge Poza

== Q ==
- Anthony Quinn

== R ==
- Adal Ramones
- Fabián Robles
- José Ron
- Manuel Garcia-Rulfo

== S ==
- Jorge Salinas
- Eduardo Santamarina
- Manuel Saval
- Diego Schoening
- Héctor Soberón
- Gabriel Soto

== T ==
- Ari Telch
- José María Torre
- Damian Terriquez

== V ==
- Eduardo Verastegui

== Y ==
- Eduardo Yañez

== Z ==
- David Zepeda
- Humberto Zurita
- Sebastian Zurita

== See also ==
- List of Mexican actresses
