= McEveety =

McEveety is a surname. Notable people with the surname include:

- Bernard McEveety (1924–2004), American director
- Stephen McEveety (born 1954), American film producer
- Vincent McEveety (1929–2018), American film and television director
