= Adam G. Simon =

American screenwriter, producer and actor

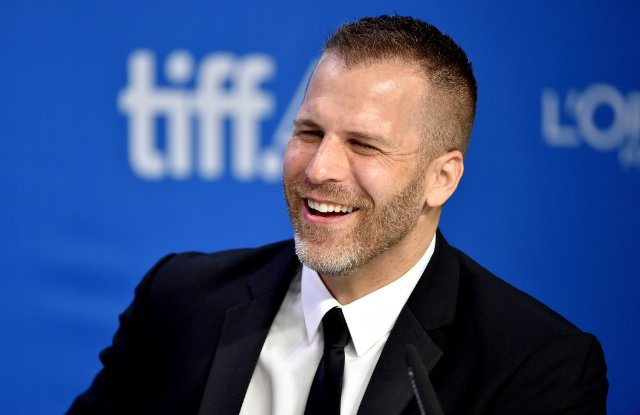
- Simon speaking at the Toronto Film Festival Press Conference for Man Down
- Born: Adam Gregory Simon; Bellflower, California
- Occupations: Screenwriter, producer, actor
- Years active: 2001–present
- Known for: Man Down, Point Blank, Riff Raff, The Dreadful, One Day in October
- Children: 3

Adam Gregory Simon is an American screenwriter, producer and actor. He wrote the films Man Down and Point Blank, and has worked as a producer on films including On Our Way, Riff Raff and The Dreadful. Simon was also named among the writers of the anthology drama series One Day in October.

== Career ==
Simon began his career as an actor before moving into screenwriting and production. In 2015, he wrote and acted in Synapse, which starred Sophina Brown, Henry Simmons, Joshua Alba and Simon himself. Simon wrote Man Down, a post-apocalyptic thriller directed by Dito Montiel and starring Shia LaBeouf, Kate Mara, Gary Oldman, Jai Courtney and Clifton Collins Jr. In 2018, Simon partnered with filmmaker Joe Carnahan on a planned reimagining of The Raid, originally directed by Gareth Evans. He later wrote Point Blank, an action thriller for Gaumont Films and Netflix, based on the French film À bout portant. It was released on Netflix on July 12, 2019. During the 2020s, Simon worked as a producer on several films. He was listed as a producer on Sophie Lane Curtis's On Our Way, which had its world premiere at the Tallinn Black Nights Film Festival. He was also credited as an associate producer on The Performance, co-executive producer on Riff Raff, and producer on The Dreadful. In 2024, Simon was named among the writers of One Day in October, an anthology drama series based on real-life accounts from the October 7 attacks in Israel. The series was produced by Fox Entertainment Studios in partnership with Israel's Yes TV, and HBO Max later acquired U.S. rights to the series.

== Filmography ==
=== Film ===
Year	Title	Credit	Notes
2010	The Kane Files: Life of Trial	Actor	Cop
2015	Chiang	Actor	Dolph Howard
2015	Synapse	Actor, writer	Frank/Nathan
2015	Man Down	Writer	
2019	Point Blank	Actor, writer	Officer T. Farmer
2021	On Our Way	Actor, producer	Tony
2021	Boss Level	Actor	Loudmouth
2022	Amsterdam	Actor	City officer
2023	The Performance	Associate producer	
2024	Riff Raff	Co-executive producer	
2026	The Dreadful	Producer	
TBA	The Raid	Co-writer	Planned remake of the 2011 film

=== Television ===
Year	Title	Credit	Notes
2013	Warrior POV	Actor	Captain Rusty Bradley / PFC William Lenard
2013	Drugs Made Me Do It	Actor	Jarrod Wyatt
2016	Blood Relatives	Actor	Bernard Pyne; episode: "Mommy Dearest"
2021	Nova Vita	Actor	10 episodes
2024–2025	One Day in October	Writer	Anthology drama series
