= Point Blank (2019 film) =

- Release poster
- Directed by: Joe Lynch
- Screenplay by: Adam G. Simon
- Based on: Point Blank by Fred Cavayé
- Produced by: Joe Carnahan; Frank Grillo; Johanna Byer
- Starring: Frank Grillo; Anthony Mackie; Marcia Gay Harden; Teyonah Parris; Boris McGiver; Christian Cooke; Markice Moore
- Cinematography: Juanmi Azpiroz
- Edited by: Jim Page
- Music by: Mitch Lee
- Production companies: Gaumont; WarParty
- Distributed by: Netflix
- Release date: July 12, 2019
- Running time: 87 minutes
- Country: United States
- Budget: $12 million

Point Blank is a 2019 American action thriller film directed by Joe Lynch and written by Adam G. Simon. The film is a remake of the 2010 French film of the same name, originally called À bout portant. It stars Frank Grillo, Anthony Mackie, Marcia Gay Harden, Teyonah Parris, Boris McGiver, and Markice Moore.

The film was released on Netflix on July 12, 2019.

== Plot ==
Abe Guevara is caught in a shootout at a residential home that results in the death of District Attorney Joshua Gregory. He is chased on foot and attempts to escape with his brother Mateo, but Abe is hit by a car, and is subsequently sent to a local hospital. A pair of homicide detectives, Regina Lewis and Eric Masterson, are assigned to the case.

Paul Booker, an everyman ER nurse, is overseeing Abe's recovery at the hospital. Mateo, determined to break Abe out in order to pay off a debt with influential gangster Big D, kidnaps Paul's pregnant wife Taryn and coerces Paul into helping him.

Paul breaks out Abe on his stretcher, and they evade detectives Lewis and Masterson just shortly after they arrive. Abe reveals that he is in possession of a flash drive that can expose several corrupt police officers. While making the deal to get it to Gregory, they were ambushed, and Abe was wrongfully incriminated for his death.

Abe arranges to meet Mateo at a bus station, but realizing it is a trap, they incite a shootout and flee, engaging in a car chase. After fighting off more cops at a car wash, they escape on foot.

Seeking a new car, they consult local gangster Cheetah. Lewis and Masterson arrive, and hold them all at gunpoint. When Masterson realizes that Lewis is one of the corrupt cops on the drive, she kills both Masterson and Cheetah. Paul kills her accomplice Jones while she is distracted with incoming reinforcements.

Before Abe can meet with Mateo, he is ambushed for the drive by one of Lewis' men, who abduct Taryn. Abe and Paul arrive at the rendezvous, only to find Mateo mortally wounded and soon succumbs to his injuries. Lewis threatens the two, revealing that she is holding Taryn hostage.

Having taken into his possession security footage that incriminates Lewis, Abe finalizes a deal with Big D and pays off his debt. Big D stages a distraction outside the police precinct, both to aid Paul and Abe, but also to capture footage for a movie he is developing.

Disguised as a first responder and a police officer respectively, Paul and Abe incapacitate Lewis, and save Taryn. Already in labour, she soon gives birth to their baby boy. In the aftermath, Lewis is killed by police reinforcements after Abe exposes her corruption on the TV news.

One year later, Paul and Taryn celebrate their baby boy's first birthday, who they name Matty in Mateo's honor. Abe smiles upon seeing a picture of Matty's first birthday cake, and drives into the sunset, tailed by a black SUV.

== Cast ==
- Anthony Mackie as Paul Booker, an ER nurse who later formed an alliance with Abe.
- Frank Grillo as Abe Guevara, a criminal who is trying to pay off a debt to a gang leader named Big D.
- Marcia Gay Harden as Lt. Regina Lewis, a corrupt cop.
- Teyonah Parris as Taryn Booker, Paul's pregnant wife.
- Boris McGiver as Eric Masterson
- Christian Cooke as Mateo Guevara, Abe's younger brother and partner in crime
- Markice Moore as Big D, a gang leader who wants to be a movie director.

== Production ==
The project was announced in June 2018, with Joe Lynch directing and Frank Grillo and Anthony Mackie set to star in the lead roles. In July 2018, Marcia Gay Harden, Teyonah Parris, Boris McGiver, and Markice Moore joined the cast of the film. In August 2018, Christian Cooke joined the cast.

Principal production began on August 6, 2018 in Cincinnati. Locations include the lobby of the Dixie Terminal building, appearing as a train terminal during a chase scene.

== Release ==
It was released on July 12, 2019.

== Reception ==
On review aggregation website Rotten Tomatoes, the film holds an approval rating of 41% based on 34 reviews, with an average rating of 5.1/10. The site's critical consensus reads, "Point Blank has its reasonably diverting moments, but high energy and fast-paced action can't disguise this remake's frustratingly middling storytelling." Metacritic assigned the film a weighted average score of 37 out of 100, based on 7 critics, indicating "generally unfavorable reviews".

Brian Tallerico of RogerEbert.com gave the film 2 out of 4 stars, saying that the filmmakers "know how to make dirty, no-fat action movies" but that the plot twists in combination with underdeveloped characters "will make you realize you don't really care at all about what happens to these people".
