= Lewis Friedman =

American screenwriter and speechwriter

- Born: New York, New York
- Occupation: Screenwriter
- Writing career
- Language: English
- Notable works: An American Carol, BASEketball
- Notable awards: Writers Guild of America (Best Comedy/Variety, 2020)

Lewis Friedman is an American screenwriter and speechwriter. A two-time Emmy nominee, he has written for television and film since 1998. His credits include the films The Comedian, BASEketball and An American Carol, the Music in High Places documentary series, and television specials such as the Kennedy Center Honors.

Friedman was born in New York City and grew up in Milwaukee, Wisconsin, where he attended Shorewood High School. He began his career in Milwaukee in 1972 as a promoter, and later moved to New York, where he promoted Broadway shows such as Stories by Chapin, Comedy with Music and The Middle of Nowhere.

Friedman's film screenplays are comedies. His television scripts have focused on performing arts, and include awards shows such as the Kennedy Center Honors, the Golden Globes, and the Directors Guild Awards. In addition to the 22 episodes of Music in High Places, which featured artists such as India.Arie, Ryan Adams, and Alanis Morissette, he has written documentaries about Bob Marley and Burt Bacharach.

He was nominated for two Emmy Award for Outstanding Writing for his work on the 2010 and 2012 The Kennedy Center Honors: A Celebration of the Performing Arts specials. He was nominated for a Writers Guild Award in 2012 and 2016. He won a Writers Guild Award for his work on Full Frontal with Samantha Bee Presents: Not the White House Correspondents’ Dinner Part 2 in January 2020.

== Miss America Scandal ==
In December 2017 HuffPost published a number of the Miss America Organization's internal emails. In the emails, Friedman, a writer for the Miss America Pageant, made derogatory remarks about women associated with the pageant, including former winners. The publication of the emails led to the resignation of four members of the organization's senior leadership, including the CEO, Sam Haskell.
