= The Comedian (2016 film) =

- Theatrical release poster
- Directed by: Taylor Hackford
- Screenplay by: Art Linson; Jeff Ross; Richard LaGravenese; Lewis Friedman
- Story by: Art Linson
- Produced by: Art Linson; John Linson; Mark Canton; Courtney Solomon; Taylor Hackford
- Starring: Robert De Niro; Leslie Mann; Danny DeVito; Edie Falco; Veronica Ferres; Charles Grodin; Cloris Leachman; Patti LuPone; Harvey Keitel
- Cinematography: Oliver Stapleton
- Edited by: Mark Warner
- Music by: Terence Blanchard
- Production companies: Cinelou Films; Linson Entertainment; Anvil Films; The Fyzz Facility; Mad Riot Entertainment
- Distributed by: Sony Pictures Classics (United States and Canada); Warner Bros. Pictures (International)
- Release dates: November 11, 2016 (AFI Fest); December 9, 2016 (United States)
- Running time: 120 minutes
- Country: United States
- Language: English
- Budget: $9.3 million
- Box office: $1.7 million

The Comedian is a 2016 American comedy-drama film directed by Taylor Hackford and written by Lewis Friedman, Richard LaGravenese, Art Linson, and Jeff Ross. The film stars Robert De Niro, Leslie Mann, Danny DeVito, Edie Falco, Veronica Ferres, Charles Grodin, Cloris Leachman, Patti LuPone, Greer Barnes and Harvey Keitel.

The film had its world premiere at the AFI Fest on November 11, 2016, and was released by Sony Pictures Classics on December 9, 2016. The film opened to negative reviews from critics.

== Plot ==
Jackie (Robert De Niro) is an aging comic icon, determined to reinvent himself after growing frustrated with audiences only wanting him to reenact jokes and scenes from a cult classic TV show he starred in decades earlier as a beloved main character.

He attends a comedy club for nostalgia night at Governor's Comedy Club in Levittown, New York (near Hicksville, New York), hosted by Jimmie Walker. After punching out an audience member trying to film his routine, Jackie is sentenced to 30 days in jail. During his 100 hours of community service he meets Harmony Schiltz (Leslie Mann), who works at a soup kitchen as part of her community service.

== Cast ==
- Robert De Niro as Jakov Berkowitz / Jackie Burke
- Leslie Mann as Harmony Schiltz
- Danny DeVito as Jimmy Berkowitz, Jackie’s younger brother and a restaurant owner
- Edie Falco as Miller, Jackie's longtime agent
- Veronica Ferres as Karoll
- Charles Grodin as Dick D'Angelo
- Cloris Leachman as May Conner
- Patti LuPone as Florence Berkowitz
- Harvey Keitel as Mac Schiltz
- Lois Smith as Miriam
- Hannibal Buress as himself
- Greer Barnes as himself
- Happy Anderson as Heckler
- Jim Norton as himself
- Gilbert Gottfried as himself
- Billy Crystal as himself
- Bobby Rydell as himself
- Brett Butler as herself
- Richard Belzer as himself
- Nick Di Paolo as himself
- Kelly McCrann as Frankie
- Craig Castaldo as soup kitchen patron #1

== Production ==
At one point it was hoped that Martin Scorsese would direct the film. Instead, Mike Newell joined on as the film's director, only to be replaced a few months later by Taylor Hackford. Jennifer Aniston was at one point attached to play Harmony Schiltz but was later replaced by Leslie Mann.

Prior to filming, De Niro attended shows at comedy clubs in New York City several times a week to prepare for the role. Principal photography on the film began on February 21, 2016, in New York City, and other locations including Manhattan, Levittown, East Meadow and Mineola.

== Release ==
In October 2016, Sony Pictures Classics acquired North American distribution rights to the film, with plans to release the film in December, in order to qualify for awards season consideration. The film had its world premiere at the AFI Fest on November 11, 2016. It hit theaters in a limited release on December 9, 2016, with a wide opening on February 3, 2017. It was originally scheduled to open on January 13, but was pushed back to February 3.

== Reception ==
=== Box office ===
In North America, The Comedian was released alongside Rings and The Space Between Us, and was projected to gross $1–3 million from about 800 theaters in its opening weekend. It ended up debuting to just $892,021, finishing 21st at the box office. Deadline Hollywood attributed the film's poor opening to negative critical reception and lack of award buzz, similar to Gold the week prior.

=== Critical response ===
On review aggregator website Rotten Tomatoes the film holds an approval rating of 24% based on 109 reviews, with an average rating of 4.7/10. The site's critical consensus reads, "The Comedian boasts an incredibly talented cast, but they're put to poor use in an aimless rom-com whose handful of memorable moments never add up to a compelling story." On Metacritic, the film has a score of 40 out of 100, based on 37 critics, indicating "mixed or average reviews".

=== Accolades ===
Award	Category	Recipient(s)	Result	Ref(s)
Hollywood Film Awards	Hollywood Comedy Award	Robert De Niro	Won	
