= Eduardo Verástegui (album) =

Studio album by Eduardo Verástegui
- Released: June 5, 2001
- Recorded: October 2000 – April 2001
- Studio: Midnight Blue Studios (Miami, FL)
- Genre: Latin pop; latin ballad
- Length: 42:43
- Label: Universal Music Latino
- Producer: Marcello Azevedo · Estéfano · Donato Póveda · Rey-Nerio; Fernán Martínez (Exec.)

Eduardo Verástegui is the solo studio album recorded by Mexican actor and singer Eduardo Verástegui. It was recorded in Miami, Florida after he split up with the Mexican boy band / vocal band Kairo made up of Jean Paul Forat Morales and Francisco Carlos Zorrilla González. Verástegui had already two albums successful albums with Kairo: Signo del tiempo (1994) and Gaudium (1995) and compilation albums Cara a cara (1996) (jointly with Magneto) and Éxitos (1997).

This album was released by Universal Music Latino on June 5, 2001 (see 2001 in music).

It remains the only solo album of Verástegui as he moved on to an acting career.

== Track listing ==
No.	Title	Writer(s)	Length
1.	"Yo No Sé Perder"	Estéfano	04:56
2.	"Estoy Aquí Por Tí"	Estéfano	04:44
3.	"Tequila"	Estéfano; Chuck Río	04:16
4.	"Vivo La Locura"	Estéfano	05:15
5.	"Luces De La Ciudad"	Marcello Azevedo; Estéfano	03:31
6.	"Por Tí"	Érika Ender; Alejandro Martínez; Donato Póveda; Raúl del Sol	04:27
7.	"Baila"	Estéfano; Donato Póveda	03:31
8.	"Por La Falta De Tú Amor"	Omar Alfanno	04:23
9.	"A Partir De Hoy"	Donato Póveda; Érika Ender	03:53
10.	"Suave"	Estéfano	04:06
Total length:			42:44
