= Kairo (band) =

Mexican pop vocal group

- Origin: Mexico
- Genres: Pop, Latin pop
- Years active: 1993-1999
- Labels: Sony Music; BMG Entertainment
- Past members: Paul Forat (1994-1997); Francisco Zorrilla (1994-1997); Eduardo Verástegui (1994-1996); Gabriel Soto (1997-1999); Roberto Assad Martínez (1997-1999); Paulo César Quevedo (1998-1999)

Kairo was a Mexican pop vocal group established in 1993 as a trio made up of Paul Forat, Francisco Zorrilla and Eduardo Verástegui, a future actor and politician. As members left, starting with Verástegui in 1996, they were replaced with others like Gabriel Soto and Roberto Assad, who both joined in 1997, and Paulo César Quevedo in 1998. The band folded in 1999.

== Career ==
Kairo was conceptualized by Toño Berumen as an all-male trio boy band in 1993. Kairo's first single was "En los espejos de un café" based on the Italian group 883's hit "Nord sud ovest est". The song gained great popularity and was followed by the release of the first album, Signo del tiempo (meaning Sign of the times). Other singles from the album included "Háblame de tí", "Pérdoname" and "Te amaré".

The follow-up album was Gaudium, released in 1995 and resulting in singles "No nos rendimos", "Si te vas" and "Dile que la amo". But was "Ponme La Multa" the biggest hit of the album (alongside "Dile que la amo"), "Ponme La Multa" was released in May, 1995 and became a strong hit in Mexico and many other countries; the music video was about three friends who fall in love with a female highway patrol agent, this video had strong rotation in the whole year. Kairo was nominated for a Lo Nuestro Award for Pop New Artist of the Year at the 7th Lo Nuestro Awards.

In 1996, Cara a cara was released, including songs from the two previous albums like "En los espejos de un café", "Te amare" and "Ponme la multa (Fammi la multa)". The album was shared with the a rival band of the same genre called Magneto.

In 1997, the album Éxitos was released which was basically a compilation of songs from Signo del tiempo and Gaudium, with the unreleased "Mi querida Isabel" added. The album also included energy and dance remixes of three of their previous hits.

Meanwhile, Verástegui had left the band for an acting career. He continued a music career, releasing his only solo album, Eduardo Verástegui in 2001 in Miami through the Universal Latino record label.

In 1997, the album Libres was released with Soto having replaced Verástegui. Soto had been a winner of the Mister México competition. Libres was distributed for free in certain areas. "Siempre me acuerdo de tí", "Vuelve conmigo (ven)" and "Locos por tí" were released as singles. After Libres, the departure of Forat and Zorrilla was announced. Forat was replaced by the ex-Tierra Cero member Paulo César Quevedo and Zorilla by the model Roberto Assad Martínez.

Kairo released one last album entitled Pasiones in 1998 with "Bailando en tu habitación" in 1998 being their last single. The band was ended after appearing in the 1999 Teleton.

== Members ==
Originally

- Paul Forat (vocals, 1994–1997)
- Francisco Zorrilla (backing vocals, 1994–1997)
- Eduardo Verástegui (backing vocals, 1994–1996)

Later members

- Gabriel Soto (vocals, 1997–1999)
- Roberto Assad Martínez (backing vocals, 1997–1999)
- Paulo César Quevedo (backing vocals, 1998–1999)

== Discography ==
=== Albums ===
1994: Signo del tiempo

Track list

1. "En los espejos de un café"
2. "Cairo"
3. "Cuestión de piel (I like Chopin)"
4. "Las amigas (Le amiche)"
5. "Perdóname"
6. "Cuanto te quiero"
7. "Te amaré"
8. "Háblame de ti"
9. Te recuerdo"

1995: Gaudium

Track list

1. "No nos rendimos"
2. "Hacer el amor contigo (Voglio fare l'amore)"
3. "Libertad"
4. "Si te vas"
5. "Una aventura"
6. "Todo un mito (Sei un mito)"
7. "Me gusta (Mi piace)"
8. "Ponme la multa (Fammi la multa)"
9. "Lucía"
10. "Dile que la amo"
11. "Si te vas (energy mix)"
12. "Dile que la amo (energy mix)"

1996: Cara a cara (credited to Kairo & Magneto)

Track list

1. "Dile que la amo"
2. "Vuela, vuela (Voyage, voyage)"
3. "Te amare"
4. "La Puerta del Colegio"
5. "Hablame de ti"
6. "Para Siempre"
7. "Ponme la multa (Fammi la multa)"
8. "Sugar Sugar"
9. "En los espejos de un cafe"
10. "Mi amada"

1997: Éxitos

Track list

1. "Mi querida Isabel"
2. "En los espejos de un café"
3. "Dile que la amo"
4. "Libertad"
5. "Te recuerdo"
6. "Una aventura"
7. "Si te vas (Energy mix)"
8. "Ponme la multa (Fammi la multa)"
9. "Háblame de tí"
10. "Perdóname"
11. "Te amaré"
12. "Si te vas"
13. "En los espejos de un café (dance remix)"
14. Dile que la amo (energy mix)"

1997: Libres

Track list

1. "Locos por ti"
2. "Siempre me acuerdo de ti"
3. "Vivo enamorado"
4. "Como el gato y el ratón"
5. "Vuelve conmigo (Ven) (Could It Be Magic)"
6. "Así es el amor"
7. "Mi novia formal (Tieni il tempo)"
8. "Sin decir te quiero"
9. "Corazones, sensaciones"
10. "Fin de semana"
11. "Necesito una oportunidad"
12. "Tal para cual (La la la)"

1998: Pasiones

Track list

1. "Bailando en tu habitacion"
2. "Lagrimas en tu almohada"
3. "E una nanna"
4. "Tu amigo a algo mas"
5. "Que voy a hacer sin tí?"
6. "Ya no te queiro"
7. "Salvame"
8. "Ningun verano sin tí"
9. "Esta noche"
10. "Emociones"
11. "Siempre"
12. "Solo para tí"
13. "Pasiones"

=== Singles ===
- 1994: "En los espejos de un café"
- 1994: "Háblame de ti"
- 1994: "Te amaré"
- 1994: "Perdóname'
- 1995: "No nos rendimos"
- 1995: "Ponme la multa (Fammi la multa)"
- 1995: "Dile que la amo"
- 1996: "Dile que la amo (Energy mix)"
- 1996: "Si te vas (energy mix)"
- 1997: "Siempre me acuerdo de tí"
- 1997: "Vuelve conmigo (ven)" (Could it be magic)
- 1997: "Sin decir te quiero"
- 1997: "Locos por ti"
- 1998: "Esta noche"
- 1998: "Bailando en tu habitación"
