= Excuse Me for Living =

- Film poster
- Directed by: Ric Klass
- Written by: Ric Klass
- Based on: Excuse Me for Living by Ric Klass
- Produced by: Ric Klass
- Starring: Tom Pelphrey; Christopher Lloyd; Robert Vaughn; Melissa Archer; Ewa Da Cruz
- Cinematography: Chase Bowman
- Edited by: Scott Conrad
- Music by: Robert Miller
- Release date: October 12, 2012 (Limited)
- Running time: 106 minutes
- Country: United States
- Language: English

Excuse Me for Living is a 2012 American romantic comedy film written, produced and directed by Ric Klass and starring Tom Pelphrey, Christopher Lloyd, Robert Vaughn, Melissa Archer and Ewa Da Cruz. It is based on Klass's novel of the same name.

== Cast ==
- Tom Pelphrey as Dan
- Christopher Lloyd as Lars
- Robert Vaughn as Jacob
- Melissa Archer as Laura
- Ewa Da Cruz as Charlie
- James McCaffrey as Barry
- Wayne Knight as Albert
- Jerry Stiller as Morty
- David A. Gregory as Bruce
- Tonja Walker as Elaine
- Dick Cavett as Reverend Pilatus
- Kevin Brown as Officer Franklin
- Alysia Joy Powell as Nurse Linda
- Maureen Mueller as Harriet
- Shenaz Treasury as Bahdra
- Tyler Hollinger as Mason

== Reception ==
On review aggregator Rotten Tomatoes, the film holds an approval rating of 14% based on seven reviews, with an average rating of 3.45/10.
