= Anima (2026 film) =

- Directed by: Brian Tetsuro Ivie
- Written by: Brian Tetsuro Ivie
- Story by: Brian Tetsuro Ivie; Brev Moss
- Produced by: Harrison Allen; Brian Tetsuro Ivie; Chloe Rahal; Alexander Lycette; Jason Pamer; Brev Moss
- Starring: Sydney Chandler; Takehiro Hira; Marin Ireland; Lili Taylor; Maria Dizzia; Tom McCarthy; Emil Wakim; Maximilian Lee Piazza
- Cinematography: Matheus Bastos
- Edited by: Brian Tetsuro Ivie; Sam Kuhn
- Music by: Montell Fish
- Production companies: Akiko; Fieldhouse Productions; Gilbara; Kebrado; east
- Release date: March 12, 2026 (SXSW)
- Running time: 90 minutes
- Country: United States
- Languages: English; Japanese

Anima is a 2026 American science fiction road comedy film written, directed, and co-produced by Brian Tetsuro Ivie, from a story by Ivie and Brev Moss. It stars Sydney Chandler, Takehiro Hira, Marin Ireland, Lili Taylor, Maria Dizzia, Tom McCarthy, Emil Wakim, and Maximilian Lee Piazza.

== Premise ==
A young woman and an old man embark on a road trip to preserve his consciousness at an experimental facility.

== Cast ==
- Sydney Chandler as Beck
- Takehiro Hira as Paul
- Marin Ireland as Mikaela
- Lili Taylor as Julia
- Maria Dizzia as Jo
- Tom McCarthy as Pete
- Emil Wakim as Kevin
- Maximilian Lee Piazza as Ryan

== Production ==
In June 2025, principal photography was occurring on a science fiction road comedy film written and directed by Brian Tetsuro Ivie. Sydney Chandler, Takehiro Hira, Marin Ireland, Lili Taylor, Maria Dizzia, Tom McCarthy, Emil Wakim, and Maximilian Lee Piazza rounded out the cast.

== Release ==
Anima premiered at the SXSW on March 12, 2026.

== Reception ==
On the review aggregator website Rotten Tomatoes, the film holds an approval rating of 85%, based on 13 reviews, with an average rating of 7.7/10.

== Music ==
The film's musical score is by Montell Fish, an artist and friend of the director.
