= Eduardo Verástegui =

Mexican actor (born 1974)

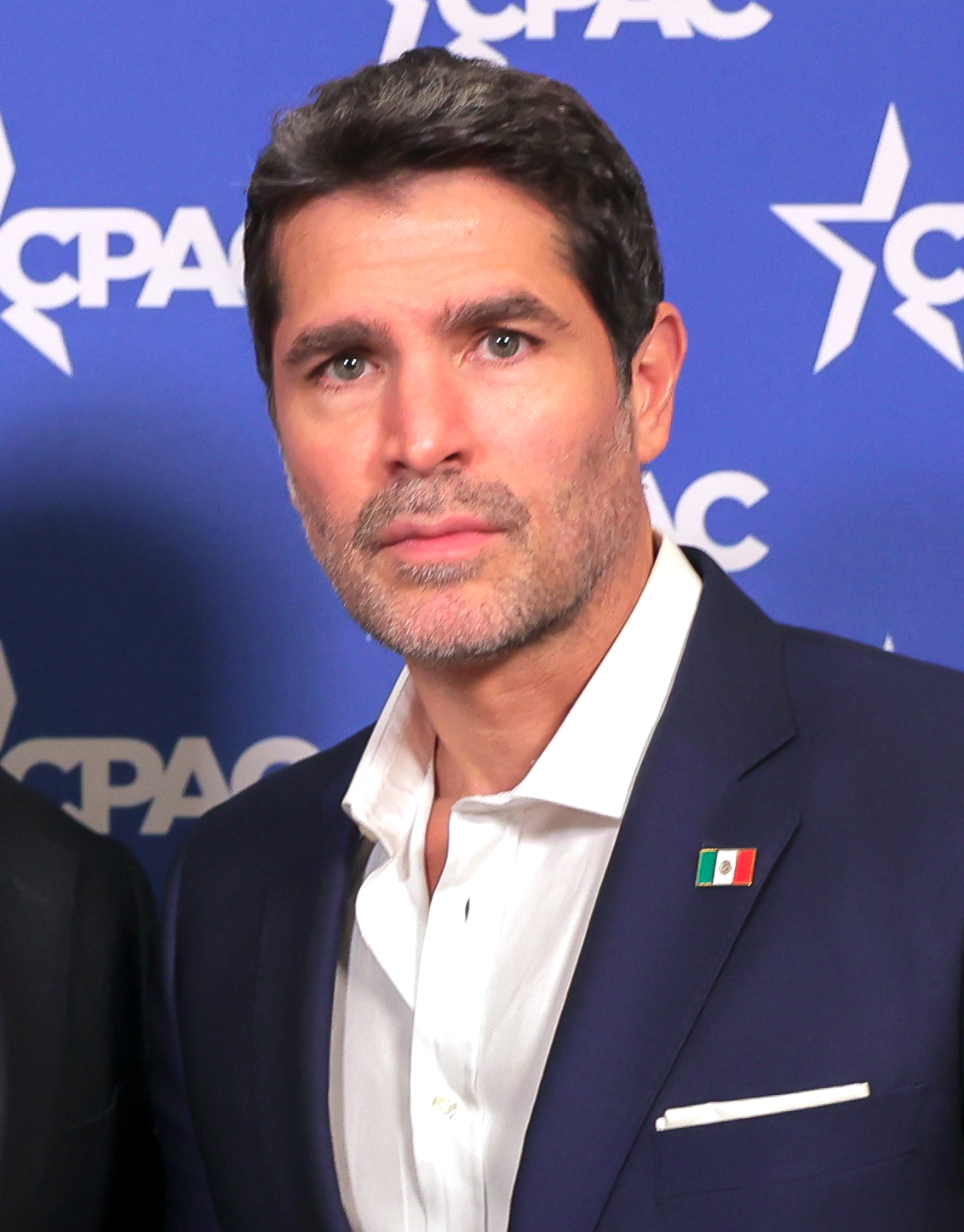
- Verástegui at CPAC 2024
- Born: José Eduardo Verástegui Córdoba; May 21, 1974 (age 52); Ciudad Mante, Tamaulipas, Mexico
- Occupations: Actor; singer (formerly); producer; political activist
- Years active: 1990s–present
- Other political affiliations: National Action Party
- Website: eduardoverastegui.com

José Eduardo Verastegui (Spanish pronunciation: [eˈðwaɾðo βeˈɾasteɣi]; born May 21, 1974) is a Mexican actor, former singer, producer, and political activist. He was part of the band Kairo and later embarked on a solo music career before he started appearing in Mexican telenovelas and eventually feature films like Chasing Papi, Bella, and Little Boy, the latter two produced by his own production company, Metanoia.

Various media outlets have described his political ideas as ultra-conservative, far-right and social-darwinist. Currently, Verástegui directs the Viva México movement. On September 7, 2023, he registered as an independent candidate for the 2024 Mexican presidential election. He was later disqualified from the election as he did not meet the required signatures.

Verástegui is active on social media, and has an active YouTube channel of nearly 300,000 subscribers.

== Early life ==
Verástegui was born on May 21, 1974, in Ciudad Mante, Tamaulipas, Mexico, and grew up in Xicoténcatl. The son of José Jesús Verástegui Treviño (1950–2022), a sugarcane farmer, and Alicia Córdoba, Verástegui was raised in a practicing Catholic family and has been interested in the world of entertainment since his childhood. After studying law for a time, Verástegui instead decided to try his hand at modeling, acting, and singing and moved to Mexico City at the age of 17 to enter the Televisa Artistic Education Center (CEA).

== Career ==
Before he began his acting career, Verástegui was a backing singer and founding member of the musical group Kairo. Eduardo Verástegui, his lone solo album to date, was released in 2001 following his collaboration with the aforementioned ensemble on the albums Signo del tiempo (1994) and Gaudium (1995).

At the end of the 1990s, he appeared in some Mexican television productions, such as Una luz en el camino (1998), Soñadoras (1998-1999), and Alma rebelde (1999).

=== 2000-2010 ===
After finding success as a musical entertainer and then as a soap opera star, he decided to pursue a career in Hollywood. In 2002, before filming commenced on Chasing Papi, Verástegui took voice-coaching lessons to improve his English pronunciation. The coach was a committed Catholic, and during their conversations, Verástegui re-discovered his faith and resolved to change his lifestyle. He also declared that he had decided to turn down offers to play roles in films that conflicted with his Catholic beliefs or that insulted his Latino brethren. In an interview with Dave Hartline, the author of The Tide Is Turning Toward Catholicism, published by Catholic Report, he said he was committed to attending Mass daily, praying, reading the Bible, saying the rosary, and attending confession at least once a week. He also said that he first encountered his renewed faith in Scott Hahn's book, Rome Sweet Home, which "had a great impact on me, and its influences can be seen in much of what I do".

=== 2010-present ===
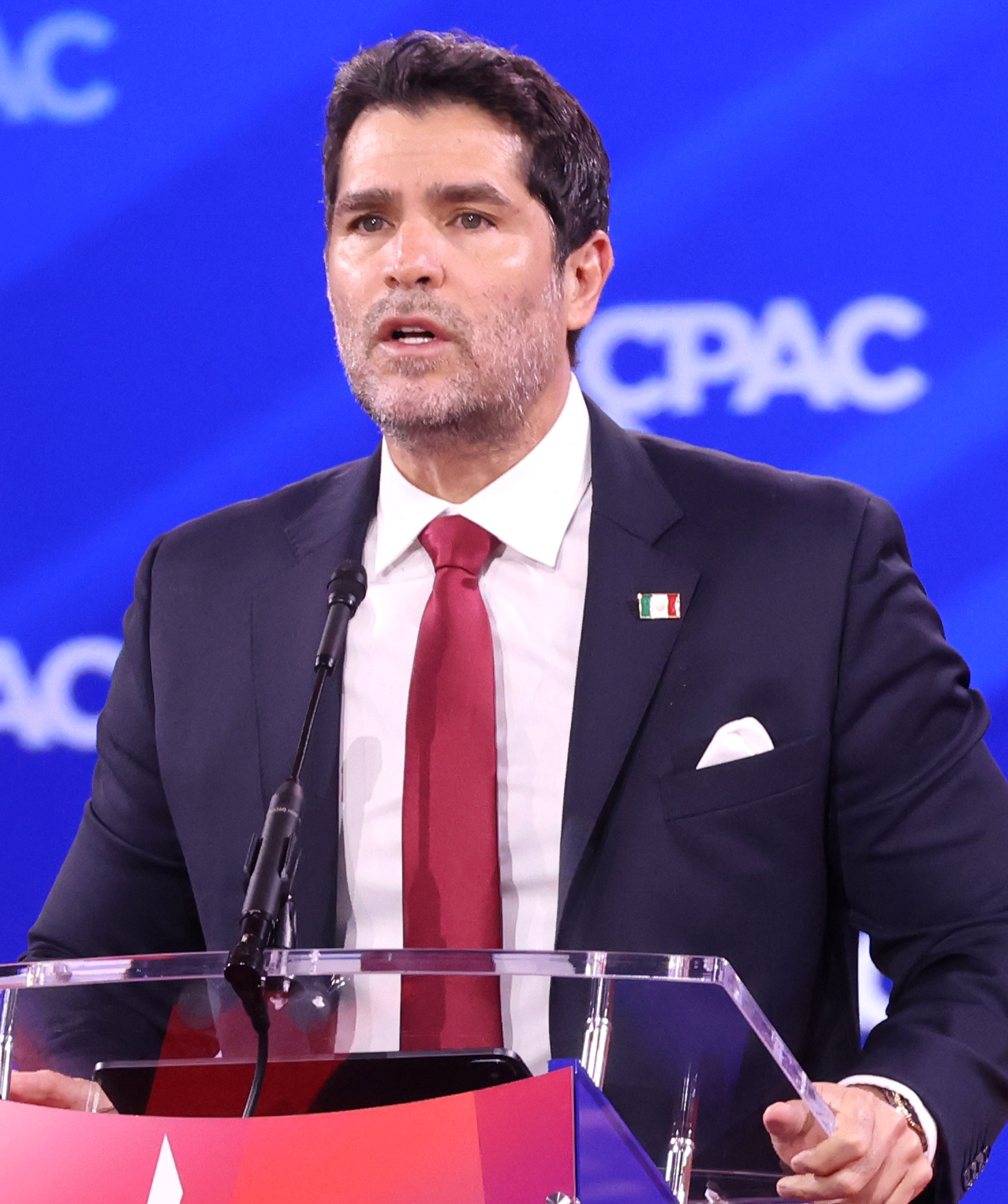
Eduardo Verástegui speaking at the 2025 Conservative Political Action Conference

In 2011, Verástegui produced a new short film titled Crescendo. The short, starring Colombian actress Montserrat Espadalé, was awarded at the Heart of Gold International Short Film Festival and won awards at other important events such as the Heartland International Film Festival, the Rochester Film Festival, the San Antonio Film Festival, and the San Diego Latino Film Festival.

In 2012, he played the Mexican martyr Anacleto González Flores in the historical film Cristiada, directed by Dean Wright and starring Andy García, Eva Longoria, and Peter O'Toole. The film was based on the events of the Cristero War and obtained several nominations for the ALMA awards in 2002, among other recognitions.

In 2014, he served as executive producer and provided the voice of Jesus of Nazareth in the dubbing of the film Son of God. A year later, he played the role of Eduardo Furtillo in Andy Fickman's film Paul Blart: Mall Cop 2 and Father Crispín in the movie Little Boy, another project from the company Metanoia Films, where he again served as producer. The film, starring Emily Watson, Kevin James, David Henri, Jakob Salvati, and Ben Chaplin, tells the story of Pepper, an eight-year-old boy who goes to great lengths to reunite with his father, a soldier who fought in World War II and was captured by the Japanese. In 2016, Verástegui produced the documentary The Other Part: The Untold History of Narco, a work that tells the story of the son of one of Mexico's first drug traffickers and his fight for redemption.

In 2017, the actor made an appearance in the episode "Trainer Wreck" of the second season of the American CBS television series Kevin Can Wait, playing the role of Alejandro. A year later, filming began in the city of Bogotá on a new Metanoia Films production titled Sound of Freedom, which presented the events of the rescue carried out by the organization Operation Underground Railroad (OUR) of more than one hundred child victims of sexual exploitation in Colombia. That same year, it was announced that American actor Jim Caviezel would be in charge of playing Tim Ballard, founder of the OUR organization.

== Political activism ==
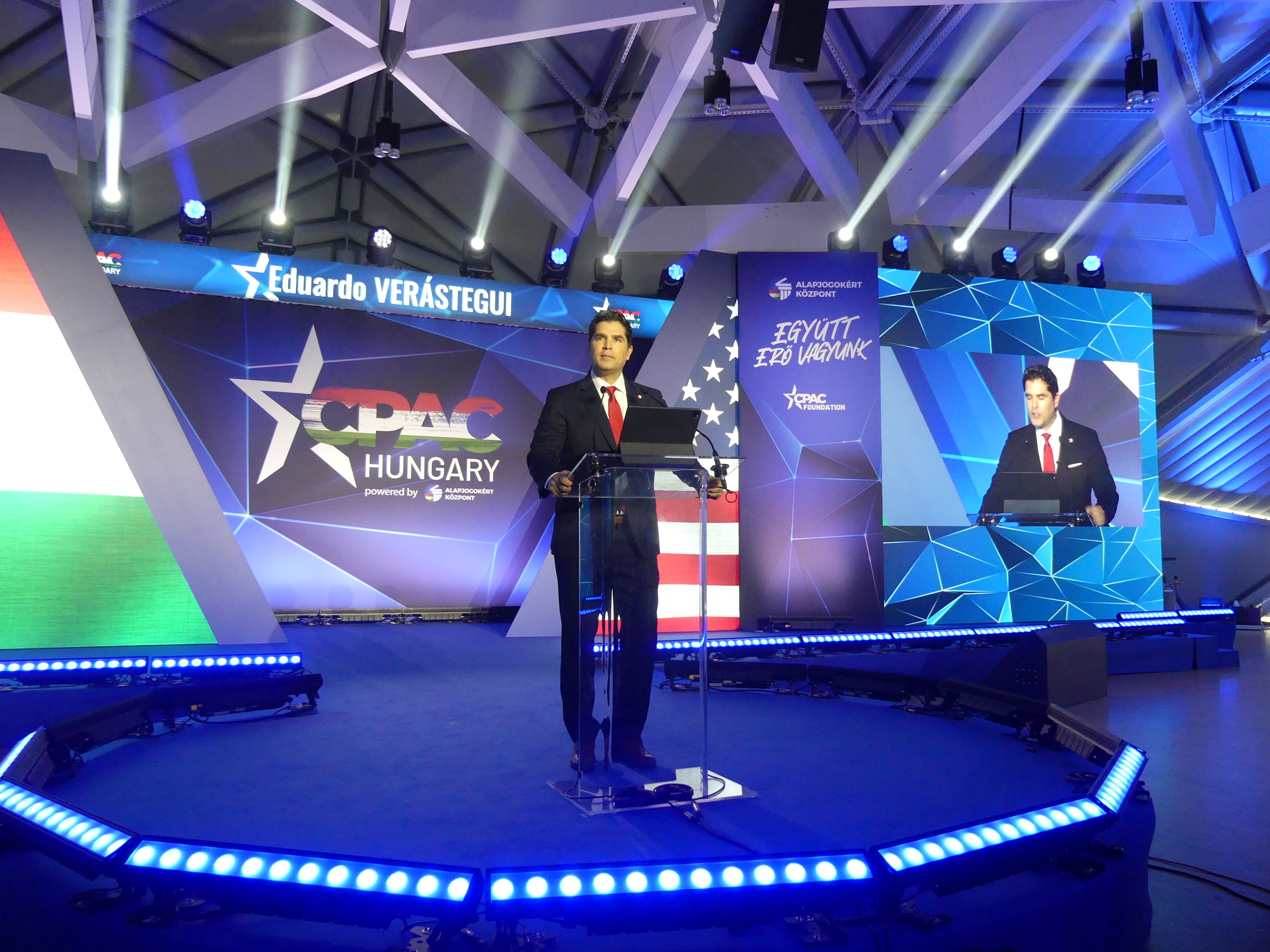
Eduardo Verástegui speaking at CPAC Hungary 2023

Verástegui is an advocate through the organization Manto de Guadalupe, which he helped get started. He has said that while researching his role in Bella, he visited an abortion clinic, where he spoke with a Hispanic couple who were there for an abortion. According to his account, they recognized him from his telenovela work on Mexican television and listened as he described his upcoming role and the film's plot. He said the couple then decided not to proceed with the abortion and returned home. After their child was born, they contacted him to share the news, thank him, and ask permission to name the baby Eduardo after him. He later met the child, whom he referred to as "little Eduardo".

In 2008, he released a lengthy video message criticizing the high abortion rate among Hispanic communities in the United States and accusing the Barack Obama campaign of targeting Hispanic communities with pro-abortion messages during the presidential race. He has also been active in anti-abortion organizations and founded Manto de Guadalupe, an anti-abortion organization based in Los Angeles that operates a crisis pregnancy center.

On September 15, 2020, US President Donald Trump announced his intention to appoint Eduardo Verástegui to the President's Advisory Commission on Educational Excellence for Hispanics. Verástegui also signed the Madrid Charter, a document drafted by the Spanish right-wing populist party Vox that describes left-wing groups as "enemies of Ibero-America" and as part of a "criminal project" operating "under the umbrella of the Cuban regime".

In November 2022, Verástegui organized a Conservative Political Action Conference (CPAC) in Mexico.

=== 2024 presidential campaign ===
In September 2023, he filed paperwork with the National Electoral Institute, enabling him to collect signatures for a possible run as an independent candidate for president of Mexico in the 2024 general election. His efforts were unsuccessful, as his campaign did not meet the required signatures; he only got 154,828 signatures, far behind the 961,405 signatures necessary for participating.

As of February 2024, Verástegui was under investigation by the National Electoral Institute (INE) for illegal foreign funding of his presidential campaign. There were financial transactions from a political firm in Miami to Verástegui's account. Verástegui then transferred US$390,000 from that personal account to his campaign between October and December 2023. The INE has asked the Financial Intelligence Unit and the Tax Administration Service to look into the origin of these funds.

== Controversies ==
=== Alleged Nazi salute at CPAC ===
In February 2025, Verástegui performed a gesture resembling a Nazi salute at the end of his speech at the Conservative Political Action Conference (CPAC) in the United States. After saying, "My heart is with all of you" (a reference to the same gesture by Elon Musk at the 2025 inauguration), and touching his chest, he raised his right arm with his hand extended, mimicking the fascist gesture. This incident adds to other similar gestures at the 2025 CPAC. Former Donald Trump advisor Steve Bannon was also accused of making a Nazi salute during his speech at the event. Bannon denied the accusation, claiming the gesture was simply a wave to the crowd.

=== Accusation of censorship by Mexican public media ===
In late December 2025, journalist Sabina Berman recorded an interview with Verástegui for her program Largo aliento, produced by her and broadcast by the public broadcasters Canal Once, operated by the National Polytechnic Institute, and Canal Catorce, operated by the Mexican State Public Broadcasting System (SPR). Berman announced the interview on X and TikTok on January 6, 2026, with broadcasts scheduled for January 8 and 10 respectively; however, the interview did not air as planned. On January 9, the Audience Ombudsman offices of both networks issued a statement indicating that, in their view, the content of the interview did not conform to the constitutional and legal principles governing the SPR and could promote ideas contrary to the fundamental rights of women and vulnerable groups.

Verástegui described the decision as censorship on social media, accused the government of engaging in what he characterized as "fascist" practices, and stated that he intended to distribute the interview through alternatives, and cited Trump and US Secretary of State Marco Rubio to observe the situation. Berman stated that she was unaware of the decision, that she had expected the interview to be broadcast, and that the decision not to air it was made by the networks. On January 13, Berman released the full interview on her personal YouTube account.

== Ventures ==
Verástegui cofounded the production company Metanoia Films (the Greek word for "conversion") with co-founders and partners Sean Wolfington, Alejandro Gomez Monteverde, and Leo Severino. The company is based in Beverly Hills, California. The company released its debut film, Bella, directed by Alejandro Gomez Monteverde and starring Verástegui. The company's latest project is Little Boy, written by Alejandro Monteverde and Pepe Portillo. Starring Emily Watson, Kevin James, David Henrie, Jakob Salvati, and Ben Chaplin, and set in 1945, it tells the story of Pepper, an eight-year-old who does all he can to be reunited with his father, a soldier fighting in World War II and captured by the Japanese. Meanwhile, Pepper has to befriend Hashimoto, a Japanese man living in his town.

== Discography ==
=== Solo discography ===
| Title | Album details |
|---|---|
| Eduardo Verástegui | Released: June 5, 2001; Label: Universal Music Latino |

=== Kairo discography ===
- Signo del tiempo (1994)
- Gaudium (1995)
- Cara a cara (1996; with Magneto)
- Éxitos (1997)

=== Kairo singles ===
- 1994: "En los espejos de un café"
- 1994: "Háblame de ti"
- 1994: "Te amaré"
- 1994: "Perdóname'
- 1995: "No nos rendimos"
- 1995: "Ponme la multa (Fammi la multa)"
- 1995: "Dile que la amo"

=== Music videos ===
- 2001: Jennifer Lopez's "Ain't It Funny" (Alt. Version) (playing her love interest in the music video)

== Filmography ==
=== Film ===
| Year | Title | Role | Notes |
|---|---|---|---|
| 2003 | Chasing Papi | Thomas Fuentes | Film debut role |
| 2005 | Meet Me in Miami | Eduardo | |
| 2006 | Bella | José | Also producer |
| 2009 | The Butterfly Circus | Mr. Mendez | Short film |
| 2012 | For Greater Glory | Anacleto Gonzales Flores | |
| 2014 | Son of God | Jesus | Executive producer Spanish Latin American version |
| 2015 | Paul Blart: Mall Cop 2 | Eduardo Furtillo | |
| 2015 | Little Boy | Fr. Crispin | Executive producer |
| 2023 | Sound of Freedom | Paul Delgado | Also producer |

=== Television ===
| Year | Title | Role | Notes |
|---|---|---|---|
| 1996 | Mi querida Isabel | —N/a | Episode: "Malaysia" |
| 1998 | Una luz en el camino | Daniel | 90 episodes |
| 1998 | Soñadoras | Manuel Jr. / Manuel Vasconcelos Jr. | 174 episodes |
| 1999 | Alma rebelde | Emiliano Hernández / Mario Expósito | 94 episodes |
| 2000 | Tres Mujeres | Ramiro Belmont | Episode: "#1.1" |
| 2003 | CSI: Miami | Jarod Parker | Episode: "Forced Entry" |
| 2003 | Karen Sisco | Tuck Rodriguez | Episode: "Dear Derwood" |
| 2004 | Charmed | Mr. Right | Episode: "Prince Charmed" |
| 2015 | Nuestra Belleza Latina 2015 | Himself | Celebrity guest (Finale) |
| 2017 | Kevin Can Wait | Alejandro | Episode: "Trainer Wreck" |

== See also ==
- List of Mexican actors
