= One Day in October =

Israeli-American anthology television series

- Genre: Anthology; Drama
- Created by: Oded Davidoff; Daniel Finkelman
- Written by: Oded Davidoff; Liron Ben-Shlosh; Adam G. Simon; Keren Weissman; Amir Hasfari
- Directed by: Oded Davidoff; Daniel Finkelman
- Starring: Michael Aloni; Lior Ashkenazi; Moran Rosenblatt; Yael Abecassis; Hisham Sulliman
- Composer: Tomer Biran
- Countries of origin: Israel; United States
- Original language: English
- No. of seasons: 1
- No. of episodes: 7

Production
- Producers: Aviv Ben-Shlosh; Lee Kuperman Ben-Shlosh; Daniel Finkelman; Chaya Amor
- Cinematography: Lael Utnik
- Running time: 60 minutes
- Production companies: yes; Fox Entertainment

Original release
- Network: yes HBO Max
- Release: October 7, 2024

One Day in October (Israeli title: Red Dawn, Hebrew: שחר אדום, romanized: Shahar Adom) is an anthology drama miniseries based on the personal stories from the October 7 attacks in 2023. It was created and directed by Oded Davidoff and Daniel Finkelman. Co-produced by Yes and Fox Entertainment, the first four episodes premiered on Yes Drama in Israel on October 7, 2025, with the remaining three episodes following later that month. All seven episodes became available in the United States through HBO Max on October 7, 2025. It received critical acclaim in Israel and internationally.

== Background ==
At a gala event on 5 June 2024, Yes announced the project and casting.

On 19 August 2024, it was reported that yes and Fox Entertainment were co-producing a new anthology drama series based on the events of the October 7 attacks.

On the same day, Fernando Szew, head of Fox Entertainment, released a statement: "’One Day in October’ is among the most powerful projects I’ve seen, let alone been involved with. Beautifully filmed, yet gut-wrenching, these are stories of people at their best in the midst of unimaginable, horrible circumstances. The survivors portrayed in this series allowed for their horrific experiences to be represented by wonderful talent — both in front of and behind the camera — which will invite the audience to ultimately feel their profound love of, and for, life."

US-based co-creator Daniel Finkelman was motivated to make the series, having been deeply affected by the October 7 attacks.

== Cast ==
- Michael Aloni as Ariel Golan-Hogeg
- Lior Ashkenazi as Ofer Lieberman
- Yael Abecassis as Sabine Taasa
- Moran Rosenblatt as Ellay Golan-Hogeg
- Naomi Levov as Aya Midan
- Tomer Machloof as Bedouin
- Hisham Sulliman as Ismail Elkarnawi
- Wael Hamdun as Hisham
- Swell Ariel Or as Amit Amar
- Avi Azulay as Emanuel Skaat
- Gad Elbaz as Aaron
- Yuval Semo as Avi Gian
- Neta Roth as Inbal Rabin-Lieberman
- Shani Atias
- Noa Kedar as Gali Amar
- Héloïse Godet as Michelle
- Neve Tzur as Avi "DJ" Yodpolsky

== Episodes ==
No.	Title	Directed by	Written by	Original release date
1	"Trust"	Oded Davidoff	Oded Davidoff, Liron Ben-Shlosh, Adam G. Simon, Keren Weissman and Amir Hasfari	October 7, 2024
Aya Midan (Naomi Lvov), a member of Kibbutz Be'eri, who during the attack fled with a young Bedouin from Rahat, Hisham Al-Qarnawi (Wael Hamdun). They hid together from terrorists, while being forced to build mutual trust in order to survive.
2	"Fog"	Oded Davidoff	Oded Davidoff, Liron Ben-Shlosh, Adam G. Simon, Keren Weissman and Amir Hasfari	October 7, 2024
Three United Hatzalah volunteers Avi Gian (Yuval Semo), Emanuel Skaat (Avi Azoulay) and Avi "DJ" Yodpolsky (Neve Tzur) set out in an ambulance on a dangerous journey to save lives on the morning of October 7 amid massacres and devastation.
3	"Sunrise"	Oded Davidoff	Oded Davidoff, Liron Ben-Shlosh, Adam G. Simon, Keren Weissman and Amir Hasfari	October 7, 2024
Gali Amar (Noa Kedar) and Amit Amar (Swell Ariel Or) are two young women who came to attend the Nova festival, and during the attack hid in a portable toilet cubicle. It moves from the point of view of Amit, who manages to think practically amid the terror, to Gali, who is stoned from drugs consumed at the party.
4	"Gold"	Oded Davidoff	Oded Davidoff, Liron Ben-Shlosh, Adam G. Simon, Keren Weissman and Amir Hasfari	October 7, 2024
Sabine Taasa (Yael Abecassis), a widow who lost her husband and son on October 7, attempts to rebuild her life.
5	"Home"	Oded Davidoff	Oded Davidoff, Liron Ben-Shlosh, Adam G. Simon, Keren Weissman and Amir Hasfari	October 7, 2025
6	"Gatekeeper"	Oded Davidoff	Oded Davidoff, Liron Ben-Shlosh, Adam G. Simon, Keren Weissman and Amir Hasfari	October 7, 2025
7	"505"	Oded Davidoff	Oded Davidoff, Liron Ben-Shlosh, Adam G. Simon, Keren Weissman and Amir Hasfari	October 7, 2025

== Production ==
The series was shot on location in Israel.

Some cast members met the real-life survivors that they were portraying on screen. Actress, Naomi Levov met with he met with Aya Midan and other survivors to prepare for the role.

=== Filming ===
Filming took place on location in Israel in 2024.

The series also includes some real footage taken on October 7 in Israel.

== Release ==
The series was released in Israel on October 7, 2024 on yes drama. It also received a special screening on the same day at Tel Aviv Cinematheque.

On 26 September 2024, one episode received a preview screening at the Academy Museum of Motion Pictures in Los Angeles at the closing night of the second annual Scripted Israel event.

On 15 September 2025, it was announced that HBO Max had acquired exclusive North American streaming rights to One Day in October, releasing all four episodes on 7 October 2025, the two-year anniversary of the attacks.

== Reception ==
Review aggregation website Metacritic gave the series a score of 73 out of 100, based on reviews from 5 critics.

The series was positively reviewed by Hannah Brown of The Jerusalem Post. Brown wrote: " You will relate to the people on screen as characters, not as interviewees or figures in a news report, and this makes them even more engrossing." The series also received positive feedback from Nirit Anderman in Haaretz, praising the "Sunrise" episode: "But above all it's the screenplay by Liron Ben-Shlush (whose cousin, director Yahav Winner, was murdered on October 7 at Kibbutz Kfar Aza) that gives this episode a combination of elements that under these circumstances seems accurate and ridiculous to the same extent – love, terror, clinging to life and humor. For Amit and Gali, this combination helped them stay alive. And for the viewer, it's both shocking and moving to be reminded of life's proper order of priorities.

James Poniewozik reviewed the series for The New York Times, describing it as "more stylistically adventurous" and "more attentive to the inner lives of its protagonists." than Red Alert. Poniewozik felt that the series "cannot avoid existing in a political environment." while acknowledging that "Artists, of course, are not governed by an equal-time rule. They are not obligated to tell every story, even when basing their work on real events." He continued to add that the series does "seek above all to ensure that the dead are not forgotten, with an air of duty and occasionally a mournful beauty." He concluded that the series is one of the "first-draft attempts to fix a single, terrible day in the cultural record, even as history keeps rolling forward."

On 1 October 2025, the BBC grouped the series with Red Alert in its list of "11 of the best TV shows to watch this October."
