= Ewa Da Cruz =

American actress

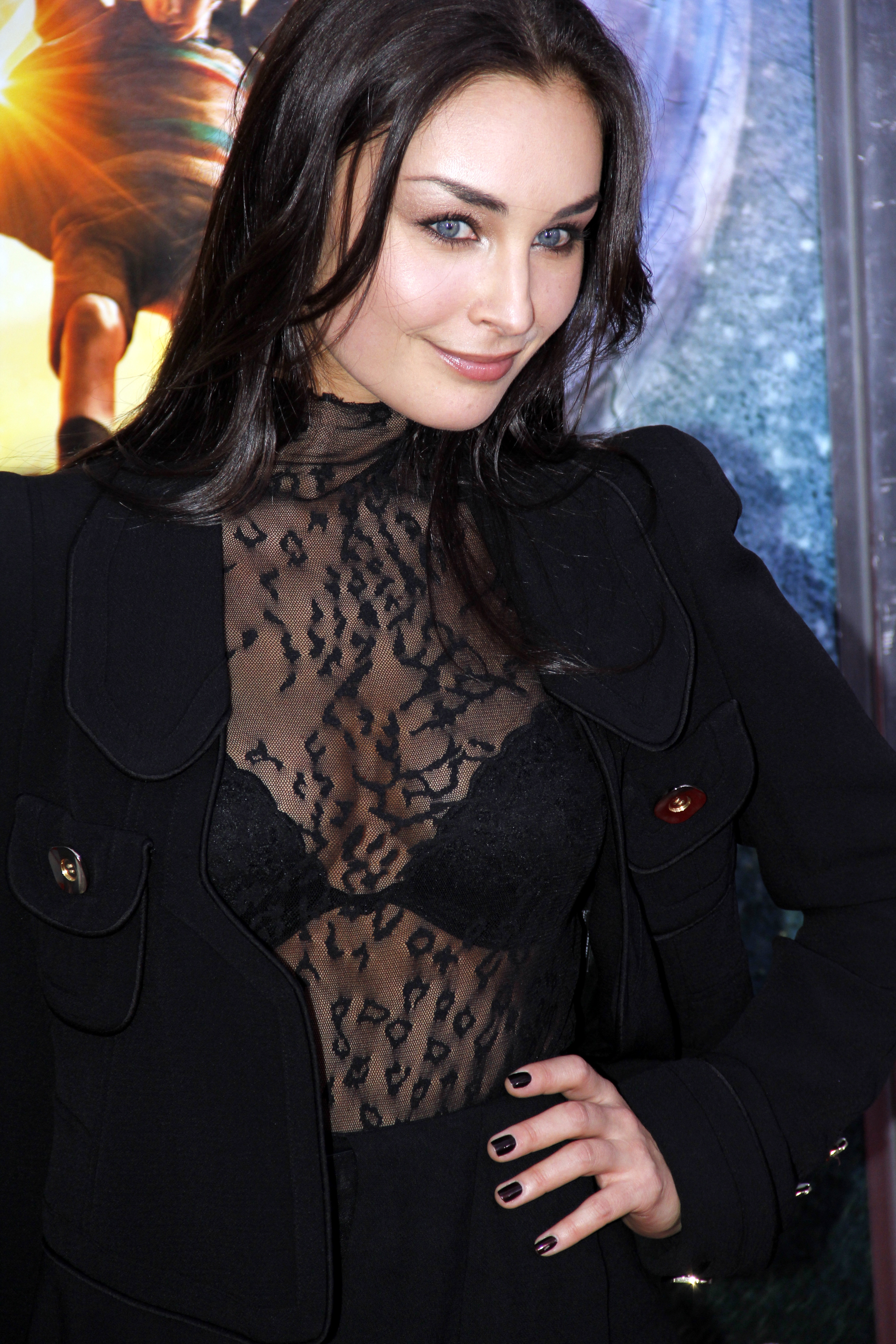
- Born: Ewa Benedicte Övre Skulstad; 9 July 1977 (age 49); Tromsø, Norway
- Other name: Ewa Benedicte Skulstad Da Cruz
- Occupation: Actress
- Years active: 2005–present

Ewa Da Cruz (born Ewa Benedicte Övre Skulstad; July 9, 1977), also known as Ewa Skulstad or Ewa Benedicte Övre Skulstad, is a Norwegian-American television, soap opera and film actress. Da Cruz is best known for her portrayal of the high-roller heiress Vienna Hyatt on As the World Turns.

== Early life and education ==
Da Cruz was born in Tromsø and raised in Bergen, Norway. She began her modeling career in her native Norway, at eight years of age, for a major clothing line. She continued to model for print ads, editorials and runways in Oslo.

Da Cruz came to the United States to attend the American Academy of Dramatic Arts in New York and graduated in 2004. She was then selected to become a member of the American Academy of Dramatic Arts Theatre Company for 2004 and 2005.

== Career ==
Da Cruz has also appeared in the video "Su Veneno" ("Her Poison") by Aventura. Since moving to New York, she has appeared in such films as Bella, Kettle of Fish, Sex & Sushi, Dice, Charlie, Abingdon, I Think I Thought, and Dogs Lie.

She played Vienna Hyatt on CBS's As the World Turns from 2006 to 2010. Da Cruz also appeared in supporting roles, on such TV shows as Lipstick Jungle, Law & Order: Criminal Intent and Damages.

=== Modeling ===
Da Cruz's modelling career includes numerous print ads, editorials, runways, covers and commercials both in Europe and the United States. She posed nude in the Norwegian edition of Playboy magazine and was the Playmate of the month for May 1999.

She has also appeared in magazines such as Film Tidskrift, Shape-Up, KK, Det Nye, Mascara, Rouge, Watch! Magazine, Capitol File and French Vogue.

Da Cruz has also been the cover model for several romance novels, including Elizabeth Hoyt's Scandalous Desires.

=== Writing ===
She is a freelance journalist with monthly columns in the Norwegian editions of magazines such as Rouge, Cosmopolitan and Mascara.

== Awards ==
Da Cruz was named one of Soap's most beautiful women in Soap Opera Digest in 2007.

She was also voted ATWT's hottest "newcomer" in Soap Opera Digest in 2007.

At Soap Central she was nominated and won the 2007 Dankies as an Outstanding Special Guest or Recurring Role.

She was also nominated at the 2007-2008 Dankies for a host of awards, including Outstanding Supporting Actress, Outstanding Newcomer, Favourite Onscreen Couple or Duo, Outstanding Overall Performer and Most Attractive Female Star (which she won).

== Filmography ==
=== Film ===
Film performances
Year	Title	Role	Notes
2006	Sex & Sushi	Spring Girl 1	
2006	Kettle of Fish	Inga	
2006	Bella	Veronica	
2007	Charlie	Emma the Dancer	
2011	Dogs Lie	Lucia	
2012	Excuse Me for Living	Charlie	
2013	Kill Buljo 2	Randi	
2014	Reya	The Understudy	
2017	The Unattainable Story	Annick	

=== Television ===
Television performances
Year	Title	Role	Notes
2006–2010	As the World Turns	Vienna Hyatt	277 episodes
2008	Lipstick Jungle	Chantel	Episode: "The Lyin', the Bitch and the Wardrobe"
2010	Damages	Prostitute	2 episodes
2010	Law & Order: Criminal Intent	Marya	Episode: "Loyalty: Part 1"
