= Melissa Archer =

American actress and writer (born 1979)

- Born: Melissa Jean Archer; December 2, 1979 (age 46); Dallas, Texas, U.S.
- Occupations: Actress; writer
- Years active: 1997–present
- Known for: Natalie Buchanan on One Life to Live
- Spouse: Glenn Angelino (m. 2008; div. 2016)
- Website: melissaarcher.com

Melissa Jean Archer (born December 2, 1979) is an American actress and writer. She is known for playing the roles of Natalie Buchanan on the ABC Daytime soap opera One Life to Live (2001 to 2013) and Serena Mason on the NBC Daytime soap opera Days of Our Lives (2014 to 2015, 2017). She won two Soap Opera Digest Awards for her role on One Life to Live. As a writer, she has worked on the Lifetime television films Twisted Little Lies (2021), Betrayed by My Bridesmaid (2022), and Newlywed Nightmare (2023).

== Early life ==
Archer was born and raised in Dallas, Texas. She started taking dance classes as a child. When she was seventeen, she landed her first acting role on the children's series Wishbone. She graduated from high school a year early because she wanted to move to Los Angeles to pursue an acting career. Her parents insisted that she attend college, so she enrolled at Union Institute & University in California, studying psychology.

== Career ==
Archer auditioned unsuccessfully for a role on Passions. She also auditioned for the role of Jennifer Rappaport on One Life to Live, which went to Jessica Morris. Archer was cast as Natalie Buchanan (then known as Natalie Balsom) on One Life to Live. Her first airdate was July 16, 2001. The character was eventually revealed to be the long-lost daughter of Victoria Lord, portrayed by multiple Daytime Emmy Award-winner Erika Slezak.

In 2003, Archer won a Soap Opera Digest Award for Outstanding Newcomer for her work on One Life to Live. In 2005, she won a Soap Opera Digest Award for Favorite Triangle, sharing the award with her co-stars, Michael Easton and Renée Elise Goldsberry. In 2006, Archer and her father performed the song "Remember New Orleans" on One Life: Many Voices for Hurricane Relief, an album of songs by One Life to Live actors to raise funds for victims of Hurricane Katrina.

On April 14, 2011, ABC announced the cancellations of One Life to Live and All My Children. In September 2011, it was reported that Archer would be playing Natalie Buchanan in an online revival of One Life to Live, produced by Prospect Park. Archer played Natalie until the final episode aired on ABC on January 13, 2012. She began appearing in the online revival on April 29, 2013. The series streamed on Hulu until its cancellation in November 2013. Archer has said that she would be open to bringing the character of Natalie to General Hospital.

In 2012, Archer played Laura in the romantic comedy film Excuse Me for Living, co-starring with Tom Pelphrey. Archer also starred as Laura Buccellato in the crime drama film West End (2013), co-starring with Eric Roberts. In 2014, Archer began playing the recurring role of Evelyn Preston in the soap opera web series Beacon Hill.

In August 2014, it was announced that Archer had been cast in the newly created role of Serena Mason on Days of Our Lives. Her first airdate was December 5, 2014. In April 2015, Archer was let go from the series. Archer's last airdate was August 27, 2015. The character of Serena was murdered by a serial killer.

Archer played Kelly Smithson in the film Coach of the Year (2015). She and her former One Life to Live co-star Jessica Morris produced and starred in a comedy web series, Viral. Archer co-starred with Sean Kanan in the action film South32 (2016). She joined the cast of the web series Youthful Daze. She also appeared on the web series The Bay.

In 2017, Archer starred as Maxine Payton in the Lifetime television film Their Killer Affair, co-starring with Brandon Beemer and Lauralee Bell. She returned to Days of Our Lives as Serena Mason for one episode, on October 31, 2017. She was cast in the television miniseries Ladies of the Lake: Return to Avalon, co-starring with Jessica Morris. In 2021, Archer appeared in the web series Here to There. The series won two Awards of Recognition at the IndieFEST Film Awards, which she shared with her co-stars.

Archer and Jessica Morris co-wrote and starred together in the Lifetime film Twisted Little Lies. In 2022, they co-wrote another Lifetime film, Betrayed by My Bridesmaid. Archer guest-starred on the Great American Pure Flix series Saved by Grace. In 2023, she wrote a third Lifetime film, Newlywed Nightmare.

== Personal life ==
Archer announced her engagement to Glenn Angelino in September 2006. They were married on August 8, 2008, in Mexico. She filed for divorce in 2015 and it was finalized in 2016.

In December 2022, Archer revealed that she had been involved in a cult a few years earlier. The cult was led by a man in Tanzania, whom Archer believed at the time to be her spiritual father and the mouthpiece of God. After a trip with four other women to the home church in Tanzania for leadership training, Archer's instincts told her that something was wrong. After a friend confessed to her that she had been molested by the cult leader, Archer decided to leave. She returned home, joined a new church, and received therapy for post-traumatic stress disorder.

== Filmography ==
=== Film ===
Year	Title	Role	Notes
2012	Excuse Me for Living	Laura	
2013	West End	Laura Buccellato	
2015	Coach of the Year	Kelly Smithson	
2015	Sweet Dissolution		Short film
2016	Wraith	Jessica	Short film
2016	South32	Delilah	
2024	The Actor	Regina H. Whetherspoon	

=== Television ===
Year	Title	Role	Notes
1997	Wishbone	Sarah Johnson	Episode: "A Bone of Contention"
2001–2013	One Life to Live	Natalie Buchanan	Contract role 787 episodes
2014–2015; 2017	Days of Our Lives	Serena Mason	Contract role 103 episodes
2017	Their Killer Affair	Maxine Payton	Television film
2018	The Ladies of the Lake: Return to Avalon	Crystal	Television miniseries Episode: "Roth"
2021	Twisted Little Lies	Christina Thompson	Television film Also co-writer
2022	Saved by Grace	Sarah	Episode: "Don't Judge a Book by its Cover"

=== Web series ===
Year	Title	Role	Notes
2014–2020	Beacon Hill	Evelyn Preston	6 episodes
2015	Viral	Kat	Episode: "Pilot" Also executive producer
2016	Youthful Daze	Monica Reynolds	78 episodes
2017	The Bay	Young Mickey Walker	Episode: "Unveiled"
2021	Here to There	Casey Cardwell	3 episodes

=== Video game ===
Year	Title	Role	Notes
2019	Alt-Frequencies		Credited as Melissa 'Misty' Archer

== Awards and nominations ==
Year	Award	Category	Title	Result	Ref.
2003	Soap Opera Digest Award	Outstanding Newcomer	One Life to Live	Won	
2005	Soap Opera Digest Award	Favorite Triangle (shared with Michael Easton and Renée Elise Goldsberry)	One Life to Live	Won	
2022	IndieFEST Film Awards	Award of Recognition - Television Program/Series (shared with Jeremy Licht)	Here to There	Won	
2022	IndieFEST Film Awards	Award of Recognition - Ensemble Cast (shared with Kim Wozniak and David A. Gregory)	Here to There	Won	
