= Emanuel (film) =

2019 documentary film directed by Brian Ivie

- Directed by: Brian Tetsuro Ivie
- Written by: Brian Tetsuro Ivie
- Produced by: Viola Davis; Stephen Curry; Mariska Hargitay; Brian Tetsuro Ivie; Julius Tennon; Mike Wildt; John Shepherd; Erick Peyton; Dimas Salaberrios; David Segel; Tina Segel; Dane Smith; Jeron Smith
- Cinematography: Daniel Stewart
- Distributed by: Fathom Events
- Release date: June 17, 2019
- Running time: 75 minutes
- Country: United States
- Language: English

Emanuel is a 2019 documentary film directed by Brian Tetsuro Ivie about the Charleston church shooting that killed nine Emanuel AME church members in an act of terror. Stephen Curry and Viola Davis are executive producers; Mariska Hargitay is a co-producer. Emanuel first received critical acclaim at the 2018 Geena Davis’ Bentonville Film Festival, where it won the Jury Prize for Best Documentary. The film also won the Heartland International Film Festival audience choice award. Emanuel’s limited theatrical release opened June 17, 2019—exactly four years after the shootings.

== Synopsis ==
After 21-year-old white supremacist Dylann Roof opened fire during a prayer service in a Charleston, South Carolina church, nine African Americans were killed. Forty-eight hours later, the families of the Emanuel Nine stood in court facing the killer and offered words of forgiveness. Featuring interviews with survivors and family members, the documentary examines the history of race relations in Charleston, the significance and impact of Emanuel African Methodist Episcopal Church, and the effect on the community from the offered forgiveness.

== Production ==
When director Brian Tetsuro Ivie first heard of the Charleston church shooting, he knew it was a story he wanted to tell. But he also wanted to give the families time to heal. A year later, he began filming the movie in Charleston, with interviews conducted at Emanuel AME Church and the homes of victims’ families, among other locations.

== Distribution ==
In January, 2020, the film made its television debut on Starz, in conjunction with the Martin Luther King Jr. holiday. The film was later released free to the public for a two-week window beginning on June 2, 2020, to encourage education on racial injustice.

== Themes ==
Justice, faith, peace and forgiveness are key themes throughout the documentary.

== Impact ==
The producers of Emanuel are donating their profits from the film to the survivors of the shooting and the families of the victims.
