= Little Boy (film) =

2015 film by Alejandro Gómez Monteverde

- Theatrical release poster
- Directed by: Alejandro Monteverde
- Written by: Alejandro Monteverde; Pepe Portillo
- Produced by: Leo Severino; Eduardo Verástegui; Alejandro Monteverde
- Starring: Emily Watson; Cary-Hiroyuki Tagawa; Michael Rapaport; David Henrie; Eduardo Verástegui; Ben Chaplin; Tom Wilkinson
- Cinematography: Andrew Cadelago
- Edited by: Fernando Villena; Meg Ramsay; Joan Sobel
- Music by: Stephan Altman; Mark Foster
- Production companies: Metanoia Films; Santa Fé Films
- Distributed by: Open Road Films (United States); Videocine (Mexico)
- Release date: April 24, 2015
- Running time: 107 minutes
- Countries: United States; Mexico
- Language: English
- Budget: $20 million
- Box office: $17.7 million

Little Boy is a 2015 war drama film directed by Alejandro Gómez Monteverde. The screenplay is by Monteverde and Pepe Portillo, and the film was produced by Eduardo Verástegui and Leo Severino, and edited by Joan Sobel and Fernando Villena. The film stars Jakob Salvati, Emily Watson, David Henrie, Cary-Hiroyuki Tagawa, Michael Rapaport, Ben Chaplin, Eduardo Verástegui, Ted Levine, Abraham Benrubi, Toby Huss, Kevin James, and Tom Wilkinson. The title is a reference to Little Boy, the code name for the atomic bomb dropped on Hiroshima, as well as a reference to the main character Pepper's height. The film was co-produced by Metanoia Films and Santa Fé Films and was released on April 24, 2015, by Open Road Films. It was released on DVD and Blu-ray on August 18, 2015, by Universal Pictures Home Entertainment. The film received negative reviews from mainstream critics and earned $17 million on a $20 million budget. An Indian adaptation of the film, titled Tubelight and starring Salman Khan in the lead role, also opened to negative reviews in 2017.

== Plot ==
In the seaside town of O'Hare, California, an 8-year-old boy who is small for his age, Pepper Flynt Busbee, has a very close relationship with James, his loving father, which begins from the very moment he is born when his father cradles him in his arms and notices how small he is. When Pepper asks a doctor if he has dwarfism, the doctor tells him, "For now, Pepper, let's just say you're a 'little boy.'" This expression becomes Pepper's nickname. He comes to despise those two words and always makes a problem when someone calls him by his nickname.

However, when World War II begins, Pepper's older brother is declared ineligible for military service because of flat feet and their father joins in his place, which devastates Pepper. Not long after his father leaves for war, Pepper hears the Bible verse, "Truly I tell you, if you have faith as small as a mustard seed, you can say to this mountain, ‘Move from here to there,’ and it will move" (Matthew 17:20), and he becomes determined to get enough faith to bring his father home. Nevertheless, as his friend and mentor Father Oliver tells him, faith is useless to anyone who harbors hatred. Father Oliver tells Pepper to befriend a Japanese man named Hashimoto.

At first, the anti-Japanese sentiment Pepper has internalized – which has become prevalent in his society – makes him hesitant to follow this advice, but as he gets to know Hashimoto, he begins to value their friendship and learns from Hashimoto to stand up to those who bully him about his height. Father Oliver gives Pepper a list of tasks to complete. When Pepper's father is reported missing in action, Pepper's mother struggles to keep her family together in the face of these overwhelming hardships. His brother London, and Sam – one of the townspeople who lost a son – go to Hashimoto's home and attack him one night, leading to his being hospitalized. London is initially arrested, but Hashimoto decides not to press charges, so London is released.

An Army representative brings the news that Pepper's father has been killed and is buried in the Philippines. Hashimoto goes to the memorial service at the O'Hare Cemetery to pay his respects. Pepper and Hashimoto sit on a bench and discuss their mutual losses of family and belief. Pepper goes back to the cemetery to visit his father's grave and place the list on top of his grave marker. Pepper and his mother visit the town doctor, Dr. Fox, who flirts with Pepper’s mom and invites himself over that evening, claiming he wants to discuss the cause of Pepper’s short stature.

Later that day, a spokesperson from the Army arrives to tell Pepper's mom that James didn't die after all. The man who died had been wearing James’ boots, with his dog tags attached, and was mistakenly identified as James after being shot. The family leaves town to visit James in the hospital, and Pepper gifts James the boots that he had coveted for some time. When they arrive, they realize that James has mild amnesia from a head injury. Pepper calls his father by his longtime nickname, ‘partner,’ and gives him his gift. James holds the boots, hugs Pepper, and touches the faces of the rest of his family. Everyone kneels around James' chair and shares a group hug before driving him to O'Hare.

== Cast ==
- Jakob Salvati as Pepper Flynt Busbee
- Emily Watson as Emma Busbee
- David Henrie as London Busbee
- Cary-Hiroyuki Tagawa as Hashimoto
- Michael Rapaport as James L. Busbee
- Ben Chaplin as Ben Eagle
- Ted Levine as Sam
- Ali Landry as Ava
- Kevin James as Dr. Fox
- Tom Wilkinson as Fr. Oliver
- Toby Huss as Colonel Bob
- Abraham Benrubi as Teacup
- Kelly Greyson as Tyra
- Sam Kindseth as Ronnie
- Eduardo Verástegui as Fr. Crispin
- James DuMont as Harvey
- Candice Azzara as Bertha
- Lukas Behnken as Leonard Rice
- Mary Stein as Martha
- Eijiro Ozaki as Masao Kume
- Winston James Francis as Bukha
- Masami Kosaka as Commander Tokyo Joe
- Theodora Greece as Eliza

== Production ==
On August 4, 2011, it was announced that Metanoia Films would produce the film, with Ben Chaplin and Emily Watson joining the cast. On August 6, 2011, Kevin James, David Henrie and Jakob Salvati joined the cast. On June 20, 2014, Open Road Films picked up distribution rights to the film. On July 2, 2014, it was announced that the film would be released on February 27, 2015.

On April 22, 2015, producer and star Eduardo Verástegui told the Catholic News Agency, "It was going to be a very, very difficult film to produce, but at the same time we were in love with the story which is about believing in the impossible." It was clear to Verástegui that it would be very difficult to produce an independent film totally outside the system. More than 1,000 children were auditioned for the role of Pepper. Eventually, Jakob Salvati won the role at seven years of age, even though he had only acted on television. During the film, Salvati was frequently found praying by himself that the scene would go well. Actor David Henrie was seeking such a film as this one after emerging as a Disney star, and in the process of returning to the Catholic Church. Henrie told BreatheCast.com that the film's producers were instrumental in his conversion. "I will forever be grateful for Little Boy because it was the film that saved my life," he said. "The theme really spoke to my heart in a big way. I think it's a very foundational element and theme that everyone deals with, do you put your faith in yourself to find your own existence or do you put your theme in something bigger than you?"

== Release ==
The film was theatrically released on April 24, 2015, by Open Road Films and was released on DVD and Blu-ray on August 18, 2015, by Universal Pictures Home Entertainment.

== Reception ==
Little Boy has received negative reviews from critics. On Rotten Tomatoes, the film has a rating of 27% based on 52 reviews from critics, with an average rating of 4.43/10. The website's critical consensus reads, "Well-meaning but manipulative on a horrifically misguided scale, Little Boy is the rare faith-based film that many viewers may find legitimately offensive." On Metacritic, the film has a score of 30 out of 100, based on 24 critics, indicating "generally unfavorable" reviews.

Alan Scherstuhl, writing for The Village Voice, describes Little Boy as a "cynical, poisonous, deeply stupid film." Christy Lemire wrote in RogerEbert.com, "even by this genre's standards, the sentimental way the story twists and ends is as shameless as it is maudlin." Michael Phillips, writing for the Chicago Tribune, criticized the use of the bombing of Japan, and wrote, "Little Boy answers a question most tear-jerkers wouldn't have the nerve to ask: Can the bombing of Hiroshima be manipulated narratively, if briefly, into a position of warming our hearts? The answer is no." Tim Drake of the National Catholic Register said the film "mirrors the Holy Trinity. ... [Jakob] Salvati brings an endearing delight to his role. He is a pleasure to watch. ... The film is a nostalgic parable about faith. Yet it's not what would be described as a faith-based film. Rather, it's a mature story containing Catholic elements. It treats both the faith of Father Oliver and the lack of religious faith of Hashimoto with respect." However, Drake does object to the way in which it treats the atomic bombing of Japan. Kathryn Jean Lopez of the National Review said that the film's message is "subtle and luminous", and the film is "remarkably sweet in the least saccharine but also most humane way... a tender movie that inspires hope." She summarized it as a "heart-wrenching and encouraging movie dealing with life and death, and with faith, hope and love." Adam R. Holz, editor for the entertainment reviewing arm of Focus On The Family, Plugged In (publication), reviews: "Little Boy, then, can certainly serve as a solid (and delightfully entertaining!) launching pad for discussions about what it means to believe, and how we navigate the specifics of why we believe what we believe about miracles and God's sustaining hand in the midst of danger and tragedy. It also powerfully addresses the way we (should) treat those we think are our enemies."
