= On Our Way (film) =

American drama film

- Promotional poster
- Directed by: Sophie Lane Curtis
- Screenplay by: Sophie Lane Curtis
- Produced by: Siena Oberman; John Reyes Doyle; Julio Lopez Velasquez; Heliya Alam; Andrea Bucko; Kyle Stroud; Adam G. Simon; Joe Barbagallo; Alex Safdie
- Starring: Micheál Richardson; Jordana Brewster; Ruby Modine; Vanessa Redgrave
- Cinematography: Alex Salahi
- Edited by: Alex Safdie
- Music by: Jonathan Sanford
- Production companies: BarBHouse Productions; Artemis Pictures; Tomorrowland Productions; SugarRush Pictures; Commonwealth Pictures
- Distributed by: Gravitas Ventures
- Release date: 18 November 2021 (Tallinn)
- Running time: 90 minutes
- Country: United States
- Language: English

On Our Way is a 2021 American romantic drama film written and directed by Sophie Lane Curtis in her feature length debut. Starring Micheál Richardson, Jordana Brewster, Ruby Modine, and Vanessa Redgrave. The film had a limited theatrical release and became available on-demand on May 19, 2023 via Gravitas Ventures.

== Synopsis ==
A young filmmaker Henry (Richardson) is struggling with his latest script, which concerns the loss of the love of his life Rosemary (Curtis).

== Cast ==
- Micheál Richardson as Henry Richardson
- Jordana Brewster as Ruby Richardson
- Ruby Modine as Lily
- Vanessa Redgrave
- James Badge Dale
- Paul Ben-Victor as Mr. Alder
- Franco Nero
- Sophie Lane Curtis as Rosemary Curtis
- Keith Powers as David Adler
- Daisy Bevan as Henry's mother

== Production ==
Writing on her personal Instagram page, writer and director Sophie Lane Curtis said that she started work on the project when she was twenty two years-old. The film is produced by Edward Newberry, Siena Oberman of Artemis Pictures with John Reyes Doyle and Julio Lopez Velasquez of Tomorrowland Productions, and Heliya Alam, Andrea Bucko of SugarRush Pictures, and Kyle Stroud of Carte Blanche alongside Adam G. Simon, Joe Barbagallo of BarBHouse Productions and Alex Safdie of Commonwealth Pictures. Micheál Richardson, Keith Powers, James Badge Dale, and Jordana Brewster were revealed to be cast in October 2020 with principal photography taking place that autumn, in New York. Filming also took place in the South of France. Gravitas Ventures were revealed to have acquired worldwide rights in March 2023.

== Release ==
On Our Way premiered internationally at Tallinn Black Nights Film Festival in Estonia in 2021.

== Reception ==
Ben Dalton, international reporter for Screen Daily, placed the film at number one of his list of films of 2021.

== Awards ==
At the Ischia Global Film & Music Festival on the island of Ischia, in Campania, Italy, in July 2022 the film won the best Breakout Director of the year award for Curtis and the Rising Star award for Richardson.
