= Andrew Cadelago =

American cinematographer

- Occupation: Cinematographer
- Years active: 2002 - present

Andrew Cadelago is a cinematographer. He has worked as a cinematographer in the animation department on many Pixar films. He also did the cinematography for Bella (2006), a film which took the "People's Choice Award" at the 2006 Toronto International Film Festival.

== Filmography ==
Animation department (10 credits)

- 2014 Little Boy (pre-viz supervisor) (completed)
- 2013 Toy Story of Terror (TV Short) (layout artist)
- 2013 Monsters University (layout artist)
- 2011 Cars 2 (layout artist)
- 2010 Toy Story 3 (layout artist)
- 2009 Dug's Special Mission (Video short) (layout artist)
- 2009 Up (layout artist)
- 2008 BURN-E (Video short) (layout artist)
- 2008 WALL-E (layout artist)
- 2007 Ratatouille (layout artist)

Cinematographer (4 credits)

- 2014 Little Boy (completed)
- 2006 Bella
- 2003 Perils in Nude Modeling (Short)
- 2002 Waiting for Trains (Short)

Writer (2 credits)

- 2012 Snack Attack (Short)
- 2002 Waiting for Trains (Short)

Producer (2 credits)

- 2012 Snack Attack (Short) (co-producer)
- 2002 Waiting for Trains (Short) (producer)

Director (1 credit)

- 2012 Snack Attack (Short)

Editor (1 credit)

- 2002 Waiting for Trains (Short)
