= Bella (2006 film) =

2006 American drama film

- Theatrical release poster
- Directed by: Alejandro Gómez Monteverde
- Written by: Alejandro Gómez Monteverde; Patrick Million
- Produced by: Alejandro Gómez Monteverde; Eduardo Verástegui; Leo Severino; Denise Pinckley
- Starring: Eduardo Verástegui; Tammy Blanchard
- Cinematography: Andrew Cadelago
- Edited by: Fernando Villena
- Music by: Stephan Altman
- Production company: Mpower Pictures
- Distributed by: Roadside Attractions
- Release dates: September 9, 2006 (TIFF); October 26, 2007 (United States)
- Running time: 91 minutes
- Country: United States
- Language: English
- Budget: $3.3 million
- Box office: $12 million

Bella is a 2006 American drama film co-written, co-produced, and directed by Alejandro Gómez Monteverde, starring Eduardo Verastegui and Tammy Blanchard. Set in New York City, the film is about the events of one day and the impact on the characters' lives.

== Plot ==
In New York City, José works as a cook in a Mexican restaurant owned by his stern chef brother, Manny. When the establishment is getting ready to open, Nina, a waitress, arrives late for the second day in a row and Manny fires her on the spot. As Nina leaves, she drops a teddy bear. José retrieves it and chases her into the subway to hand it back. When asked why she was late, she tells him she is pregnant and was ill from morning sickness. José offers her a stroll around the city, which she accepts. He takes Nina to Manny's colleague's restaurant to recommend her for a waitressing position. While they dine and wait for the response, Nina tells him that she does not intend to proceed with her pregnancy and is seriously considering an abortion, partly because the father is uninterested in supporting her and she is broke.

Nina agrees to go with him to the beach, but José says he has to go back to the restaurant and get his wallet. When he returns, Manny rebukes him for flaking at work for Nina. After José argues with his brother over his oppressive demeanor, Manny fires him. José then boards a train with Nina to his home. During the trip, he tries to persuade Nina to give up the unborn child for adoption, but she argues in favor of abortion because she does not want to bring a child into the world whom she is not prepared to love. José takes her to his parents' house and introduces her to his family. He takes Nina into the garage and shows her his old car, which he reveals he had been driving with his manager a few years earlier, during the peak of his career as a soccer player, and accidentally hit and killed a little girl. His manager frantically suggested fleeing the crime, but he instead chose to take responsibility. José was then sentenced to four years in prison for involuntary manslaughter. After being released, he tried unsuccessfully multiple times to reconcile with the girl's single mother, and the tragedy has since left him depressed and suicidal.

José's parents invite Nina to have dinner, during which time she finds out that Manny was adopted. They tell her she is always welcome to stay at their house. José takes Nina to the nearby beach, where she tells him how her father's death when she was twelve caused her and her mother severe emotional pain. Because she had no siblings and spent her childhood taking care of her emotionally crippled mother, she tells José how fortunate he is to have a loving family, and hopes someday she would meet a man who loves her and is as capable of raising a family as her father was. The next day, before they each go their own way, Nina says she needs a friend to be there for her the next week. José walks back to the restaurant and reconciles with Manny.

Several years later, José is seen playing on a beach with a young girl. When Nina arrives she meets what is implied to be her daughter, Bella, whom she had considered aborting but then gave over for José to adopt. Mother and daughter exchange gifts, Nina tearfully giving Bella the teddy bear her father had gifted her as a child, while Bella hands Nina a seashell. Afterward, all three stroll down the beach together.

== Cast ==
- Eduardo Verástegui as José
- Tammy Blanchard as Nina
- Manny Pérez as Manny
- Ali Landry as Celia
- Ramón Rodríguez as Eduardo
- Angélica Aragón as José's Mother
- Jamie Tirelli as José's Father
- Armando Riesco as Francisco
- Ewa Da Cruz as Veronica
- Alexa Gerasimovich as Luchi
- Sophie Nyweide as Bella
- Herbie Lovelle as The Blind Homeless Man

== Production ==
Bella marks the feature directorial debut for Alejandro Gómez Monteverde, who co-wrote its original screenplay with Patrick Million. Bella features Manuel Pérez, Angélica Aragón, Jamie Tirelli, Armando Riesco, Ali Landry and Ewa Da Cruz. The film was produced by Sean Wolfington, Eduardo Verástegui, Leo Severino, Alejandro Gómez Monteverde, and Denise Pinckley. Executive producers were J. Eustace Wolfington, Sean Wolfington, Ana Wolfington and Stephen McEveety. It was financed by producers Sean Wolfington and Eustace Wolfington.

Stephen McEveety, producer of Braveheart and The Passion of the Christ, consulted on the script; after the film was finished, he signed on as an executive producer to help market it. Bella is McEveety's first release under his new company Mpower Pictures.

Bella was produced by Metanoia Films. Lionsgate and Roadside Attractions acquired United States distribution rights to the film and released it on October 26, 2007.

== Reception ==
On the review aggregator website Rotten Tomatoes, 45% of 65 critics' reviews are positive. The website's consensus reads: "Critics labeled Bella as a simplistic and mostly pedestrian (sic), but positive word of mouth gave this tiny indie surprising theatrical legs." Metacritic, which uses a weighted average, assigned the film a score of 47 out of 100, based on 18 critics, indicating "mixed or average" reviews.

Robert Koehler of Variety wrote, "with its storyline based on such inexplicable behavior, Bella is seriously behind the dramatic eight ball, and trusts that the effective chemistry between the two leads will help auds ignore the many narrative potholes." Stephen Holden of The New York Times said in a less favorable review, "if Bella (the title doesn’t make sense until the last scene) is a mediocre cup of mush, the response to it suggests how desperate some people are for an urban fairy tale with a happy ending, no matter how ludicrous."

Roger Ebert of the Chicago Sun-Times gave the film 3 stars out of 4, describing it as: "a heart-tugger with the confidence not to tug too hard." He concluded his review by writing, "the movie is not profound, but it's not stupid. It's about lovable people having important conversations and is not pro-choice or pro-life but simply in favor of his [Verástegui] feelings -- and hers [Blanchard], if she felt free to feel them. The movie is a little more lightweight than the usual People's Choice Awards winner at Toronto, but why not? It was the best-liked film at the 2006 festival, and I can understand that."

Bella resonated with adoption and anti-abortion organizations, who gave the movie high marks for its purported pro-adoption themes.

=== Awards and honors ===
Bella won the People's Choice Award at the 2006 Toronto International Film Festival.

Bella won the Heartland Film Festival's Grand Prize Award Winner for Best Dramatic Feature and the Crystal Heart Awards for Monteverde as writer/director/producer.

Bella's filmmakers received the Smithsonian Institution's "Legacy Award" for the film's positive contribution to Latino art and culture. "This movie depicts the culture but also transcends it," said Pilar O'Leary, executive director of the Smithsonian Institution's Latino Center. "It has universal appeal."

Bella received the Tony Bennett Media Excellence Award. Bennett said Bella is "a perfect film, an artistic masterpiece that will live in people's hearts forever."

Bella was listed by the United States Conference of Catholic Bishops' Office for Film and Broadcasting on their list of the top-ten films of 2007, noting that Bella presents an "affirmative pro-life message", along with "themes of self-forgiveness, reconciliation and redemption that should resonate deeply".

The director of Bella, Alejandro Monteverde, was given the "Outstanding American by Choice" Award at a White House reception for Bella's positive contribution to Latino art and culture in the United States. Monteverde was also invited to join the First Lady, Laura Bush, in her private box to watch the State of the Union address.

The Mexican Embassy honored the film and gave Bella a screening at their annual Cinco de Mayo celebration.

Bella broke the record for a Latino-themed film in total box-office earnings and box-office average per screen for films released in 2007. It was the top-rated movie on The New York Times Readers' Poll, Yahoo and Fandango. The Wall Street Journal said Bella was "the fall's biggest surprise" and stated that "after only four weeks in release Bella has total sales of $5.2 million." Bella ended its U.S. theatrical release with more than $10 million in domestic box office, finishing the year in the top 10-grossing independent films of 2007.

== Home media and adaptation ==
Lionsgate released a DVD version of Bella on May 6, 2008. The same date, Thomas Nelson published the novelization of the film, written by Lisa Samson. (ISBN 978-1595546081)
