= Camila Jaber =

Mexican freediver and stunt performer

Personal information
- Nationality: Mexican
- Born: 12 December 1995 (age 30) Ciudad del Carmen, Campeche, Mexico

Sport
- Sport: Freediving
- Events: Constant Weight (CWT), Constant Weight No Fins (CNF)

Camila Jaber (born 12 December 1995) is a Mexican competitive freediver, environmental activist, and underwater stunt performer. She holds multiple Mexican national records in freediving and advocates for the conservation of the Great Mayan Aquifer and the cenotes of the Yucatán Peninsula.

== Early life and education ==
Jaber was born in Ciudad del Carmen, Campeche, Mexico, and moved to the Riviera Maya at the age of eight. She studied Innovation and Development Engineering at the Tecnológico de Monterrey, focusing on water resource management and sustainable development.

== Freediving career ==
Jaber began competitive freediving at age 17, and did her first competition in 2015, specializing in depth disciplines.

=== National records ===
- In 2020, she set a Mexican national record in Constant Weight No Fins (CNF) with a dive to 58 metres (190 ft).
- In 2025, she reached a depth of 90 metres at the Blue Hole in the Bahamas during the Vertical Blue competition, becoming the deepest-diving Mexican woman in the discipline.
- In May 2025, she achieved another Mexican national record in Constant Weight (CWT), reaching 86 metres during a competition in Izamal, Yucatán.

== Film and media ==
Jaber has worked as an underwater stunt performer and actress in international productions. She appeared in the second season of the Netflix series Wednesday (2025), portraying a siren.

She has also contributed to underwater cinematography projects highlighting the biodiversity of the Mexican Caribbean.

=== Selected filmography ===
- Wednesday (2025)
- Luto (2024)
- Postcard from Earth (2023)
- Orlando Bloom: To The Edge (2023)
- Foundation (TV series) (2021–2023)
- H2O: The Molecule That Made Us (2020)
- Socorro Evolution (2018)

== Environmental activism ==
In 2021, she won the international #CreateCOP26 competition for her short film I Am Cenote. The film was created to raise awareness about ecological threats to the Yucatán Peninsula's aquifer system.
