= Sydney Chandler =

American actress (born 1996)

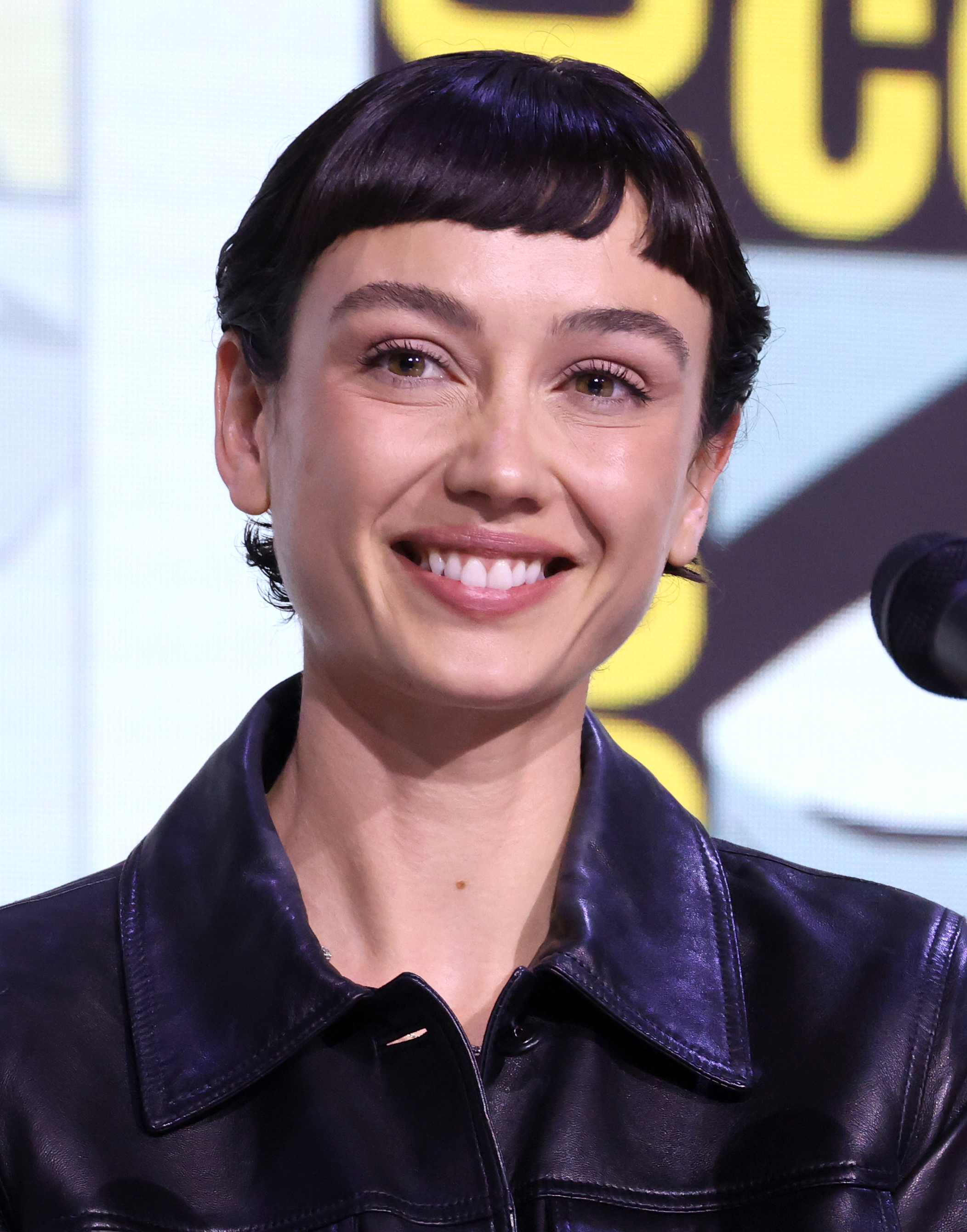
- Chandler at the 2025 San Diego Comic-Con
- Born: February 13, 1996 (age 30)
- Education: St. Edward's University
- Occupation: Actress
- Years active: 2019–present
- Father: Kyle Chandler

Sydney Chandler (born February 13, 1996) is an American actress. She began her career in the web series SKAM Austin (2018). On television, she is known for her roles in the FX on Hulu series Pistol (2022) and Alien: Earth (2025–present). Her films include Anima (2026).

== Early life and education ==
Chandler is the child of Kathryn (née Macquarrie), a screenwriter, and Kyle Chandler, an actor. Due to her father's work as an actor, her family moved around a lot, living in Chicago and Los Angeles, and eventually settling in Dripping Springs, Texas, southwest of Austin. She has a younger sister named Sawyer.

Chandler is an alum of St. Edward's University in Austin, Texas.

== Career ==
In August 2020, Chandler was cast in a reboot of the 1998 slasher film Urban Legend set to be written and directed by Colin Minihan. However, in October 2022, Minihan revealed that the film had been cancelled due to "bad timing". Chandler ended up making her film debut with a supporting role in Olivia Wilde's psychological thriller Don't Worry Darling (2022).

In January 2021, she was cast in the FX miniseries Pistol, a series about the Sex Pistols. Chandler played Chrissie Hynde, a founding member of the Pretenders. She learned how to sing and play the guitar to prepare for the role. That same year, it was announced that Chandler would star in Susannah Grant's sex trafficking drama series Coercion for Showtime. As of August 2024, production for the series has yet to start. Chandler has since appeared in the Apple TV+ mystery drama series Sugar (2024), alongside Colin Farrell.

In May 2023, she was cast in the lead role of Noah Hawley's Alien: Earth for FX on Hulu. The series wrapped filming in July 2024, and debuted on August 12, 2025.

== Awards ==
Chandler received a nomination for the Gotham Award for Outstanding Lead Performance in a Drama Series for her performance in Alien: Earth.

== Filmography ==
=== Film ===
Year	Title	Role	Notes
2022	Don't Worry Darling	Violet	
2026	Anima	Beck	

=== Television ===
Year	Title	Role	Notes
2019	SKAM Austin	Eve Olsen	Recurring role
2022	Pistol	Chrissie Hynde	Miniseries
2024	Sugar	Olivia Siegel	Recurring role
2025–present	Alien: Earth	Wendy	Main role
TBA	Creature Commandos †	Nosferata (voice)	Season 2
