= The Drop Box =

- Directed by: Brian Ivie
- Written by: Brian Ivie
- Produced by: Arbella Studios; Pine Creek Entertainment
- Starring: Lee Jong Rak
- Cinematography: Eitan Almagor; David Bolen; Shayan Ebrahim; Mitchell McDuff
- Distributed by: Fathom Events
- Release date: March 3, 2015
- Running time: 79 minutes
- Country: United States
- Language: English
- Box office: $3.3 million

== Production ==
In 2011, the writer and director of the documentary, Brian Ivie, contacted pastor Lee Jong Rak. Ivie had heard about Pastor Lee's work from the Los Angeles Times article "South Korean Pastor Tends to an Unwanted Flock." After six months of correspondence and preparation, Ivie and a production team at Arbella Studios began to film. The production of The Drop Box took two years.

== Themes ==
Sacrifice, hope, guilt, courage, and unconditional love are themes that resound through the documentary. The Drop Box explores some anti-abortion themes, although its content does not explicitly mention abortion. Rather, it emphasizes the value of the life of every child that Pastor Lee receives in the drop box.

== Reception ==
The Drop Box was released on March 3, 2015 in a limited theatrical release and garnered close to a quarter million views and public interest. It was shown in over 700 theaters in the United States. Many viewers of this documentary were inspired to contact Kindred Image, a nonprofit organization that is dedicated to ending child abandonment and creating a culture that celebrates life in South Korea. Kindred Image focuses its efforts on long-term solutions. Some projects that have been undertaken include care packages, counseling, and adoption support. Kindred Image also provides expecting mothers with necessary resources for healthy and successful pre- and post-pregnancy. Through the efforts of this organization, over 1.4 million dollars have been raised for Korean orphans and foster care in America.

== Public health impact ==
Every year, hundreds of infants are abandoned in Seoul, South Korea. Pastor Lee's drop box provides a safe location for children to be placed if parents feel they are unable to care for their child, and wish to give them the opportunity to be adopted. Pastor Lee's work also raises awareness of South Korea's Special Adoption Law, which if revised and addressed, could alleviate the child abandonment crisis. The director, Brian Ivie, was critical in the creation of Kindred Image, a nonprofit organization that addresses child abandonment issues with holistic solutions. Part of the proceeds from The Drop Box are received by Lee Jong Rak and his ministry to support his children.

Paul Boge, Winnipeg Film Director and director of Reel to Reel Film Festival, said: "We all lead busy lives and it is not possible for us to do research on every social issue. Documentaries like these give us a chance to understand issues that impact us and the world around us so we can be better informed about our responsibility in responding to these issues."
