= Man Down (film) =

- Theatrical release poster
- Directed by: Dito Montiel
- Screenplay by: Adam G. Simon
- Story by: Adam G. Simon; Dito Montiel
- Produced by: Steve McEveety; Dawn Krantz; Jon Burton
- Starring: Shia LaBeouf; Jai Courtney; Gary Oldman; Kate Mara; Clifton Collins Jr.
- Cinematography: Shelly Johnson
- Edited by: Jake Pushinsky; Mark Yoshikawa
- Music by: Clint Mansell
- Production companies: Mpower Pictures; Krannel Pictures; Binary Light; The Solution Entertainment Group
- Distributed by: Lionsgate Premiere
- Release dates: September 6, 2015 (Venice); December 2, 2016 (United States)
- Running time: 92 minutes
- Country: United States
- Language: English
- Box office: $167,085

Man Down is a 2015 American war thriller drama film directed by Dito Montiel, written by Adam G. Simon, and starring Shia LaBeouf, Jai Courtney, Gary Oldman, Kate Mara, and Clifton Collins Jr. It follows a Marine who returns from Afghanistan to find his hometown devastated, and his wife and son missing.

The film had its world premiere in the Horizon section at 72nd Venice International Film Festival on September 6, 2015. It was released on December 2, 2016, by Lionsgate Premiere, to negative reviews from critics.

== Plot ==
The story transpires in a non-linear fashion, following U.S. Marine Gabriel Drummer in training, in battle in Afghanistan, in counseling in Afghanistan, while searching for his family after returning to a devastated United States, and in his final moments as his broken mind returns to reality.

Drummer is at Camp LeJeune, training as a U.S. Marine. He and wife Natalie have a young son, Johnathan. When Johnathan gets bullied at school after Natalie tells him, "I love you", in front of his schoolmates, Gabriel comes up with "man down" as a secret code for "I love you".

Gabriel leaves to serve a tour of duty in Afghanistan. Devin Roberts is his best friend since childhood and fellow Marine. Devin stays home for a few extra weeks while recuperating from a broken arm.

Devin arrives in Afghanistan, where he and Gabriel are "battle buddies, kicking in doors together and taking enemy fire", further reinforcing their friendship. When their squad is ambushed, Devin is fatally shot and apologizes to Gabriel just before he dies. Gabriel finds a note inside Devin's helmet, on which Devin's password for a video chatting website is written. Gabriel accesses the website and realizes that Natalie cheated on him with Devin.

Gabriel is deeply traumatized by the series of events. Still in Afghanistan, he begins mandatory counseling sessions with therapist Captain Peyton, who is concerned about Gabriel's mental condition. However, Gabriel insists that he is okay and walks out of Peyton's office.

When Gabriel returns home, he finds his city devastated. Accompanied (inexplicably - a sign of his break from reality) by Devin, he searches the ruins for Natalie and Johnathan. The two encounter Charles, a civilian trying to survive in the wasteland of the former city. When Gabriel finds that Charles has the envelope from a letter that Gabriel wrote to Johnathan, he and Charles scuffle. In the confusion, Devin accidentally shoots Charles.

In the final minutes of the film, events finally sort themselves out for the viewer (but not for Gabriel). Gabriel is again seen returning home, on medical discharge for mental issues, to a perfectly normal city – although he is greeted by Devin, whom no one else can see. Natalie is uncertain about Gabriel's state of mind from the loss of Devin and the loss of Gabriel's trust in her. Gabriel ends up living on the streets, regularly traumatizing his family and eventually shooting Charles, who was simply another troubled person living on the streets.

Brandishing a gun, shooting their dog, a confused Gabriel "rescues" Johnathan from the "ruins" of their home, hiding with him in the main floor of the "ruined" building (in reality the main floor of his own home), where they are soon surrounded by the police. He strangles a policeman to death and keeps radioing Devin for backup. Natalie comes down the stairs – although Gabriel sees her as the Afghan woman who shot Devin and holds a gun to her head. He suddenly finds clarity and apologizes to Natalie and Johnathan for his confusion just moments before a police sniper shoots him repeatedly. Johnathan hugs Gabriel and tells him he loves him after he is restrained by police.

The screen fades to black, then shows the text:

- 1 in 5 veterans of the Iraq and Afghanistan wars are diagnosed with PTSD
- 200,000 veterans go homeless each night
- 20 veterans commit suicide every day

== Cast ==
- Shia LaBeouf as Gabriel Drummer
- Kate Mara as Natalie Drummer
- Gary Oldman as Captain Peyton
- Jai Courtney as Devin Roberts
- Clifton Collins, Jr. as Charles
- Charlie Shotwell as Johnathan Drummer
- Jose Pablo Cantillo as Taylor

== Production ==
In September 2014, Shia LaBeouf, Kate Mara, and Gary Oldman joined the cast of the film, with Dito Montiel directing from a screenplay by Adam G. Simon. Dawn Krantz, Stephen McEveety, and Jon Burton, will serve as producers on the film, while Lisa Wilson, Myles Nestel, Roger Goff, Russell Geyser and Clay Pecorin will serve as executive producers under their The Solution banner. That same month, Jai Courtney joined the cast of the film. In October 2014, Charlie Shotwell joined the cast of the film. Principal photography began on October 30, 2014 in New Orleans, Louisiana, and ended on December 5, 2014.

== Release ==
The film had its world premiere at the Venice Film Festival on September 6, 2015. It went on to screen at the Toronto International Film Festival on September 12, 2015, in the Gala Presentations section of the 2015 Toronto International Film Festival. Lionsgate Premiere acquired distribution rights to the film. The film was released on December 2, 2016 and has grossed approximately $450,000 in North America. In the UK it had a token release to one venue, the Reel Cinema in Burnley, Lancashire. It was simultaneously released to video-on-demand services, a practice that ensures distributors need to pay for advertising only once. It was subsequently reported that the release had cinema revenue of £7, equivalent to only one ticket.

== Reception ==
Man Down received negative reviews from critics. On review aggregator Rotten Tomatoes, the film has an approval rating of 16%, based on 55 reviews, with an average score of 3.8/10. The site's critics consensus reads: "Well-intentioned but overall misjudged, Man Down makes an unfortunately muddled attempt to mine thoughtful drama out of modern warfare's emotional wreckage." On Metacritic, the film has a score of 28 out of 100, based on 17 critics, indicating "generally unfavorable reviews".

Josh Lasser of IGN gave the film a 6.1 out of 10, stating, "Despite the audience knowing what is going to happen in advance of it occurring, and how it is all going to end, the film still manages to elicit a response." Deborah Young of The Hollywood Reporter commented that "[Shia LaBeouf's] performance is over-powered by the film's grandiose, misplaced ambition to switch back and forth between genres, from the war film to sci fi, from family film to the intimately psychological." Kenji Fujishima of Slant Magazine stated, "Sadly, Montiel fails his lead actor, trashing Drummer's anguish by turning it into a parlor trick, thus denying him the humanity LaBeouf so valiantly tries to convey."
