= John Shepherd (actor) =

American actor and producer (born 1960)

- Born: John William Shepherd; November 18, 1960 (age 65); Manhattan, New York City, U.S.
- Occupations: Actor, producer
- Years active: 1978–present

John William Shepherd (born November 18, 1960) is an American actor and producer who has starred in film and on television since the 1980s.

== Career ==
John Shepherd is best known for his role in the 1985 horror film Friday the 13th: A New Beginning as Tommy Jarvis and he speaks in the commentary of the deluxe edition DVD of the film in 2009. He also appeared in "The Baron's Bride", an episode of Friday the 13th: The Series.

Other movies Shepherd starred in were the 1992 movie Deep Cover and in the 1996 comedy film Down Periscope with Kelsey Grammer. He took a hiatus from acting to focus on producing after appearing in the 2004 film Bobby Jones: Stroke of Genius. Shepherd has made guest appearances on TV shows such as Quantum Leap, Tour of Duty, Friday the 13th: The Series, and T.J. Hooker. He returned to acting in 2019 when he appeared in the short film Flesh and Blood.

Shepherd is a producer of such films as The Ultimate Gift, Bobby Jones: Stroke of Genius, Snowmen, The Stoning of Soraya M., and co-executive producer of Bella.

== Filmography ==
=== Film ===
- Friday the 13th: A New Beginning (1985) – Tommy Jarvis
- Thunder Run (1986) – Chris
- Banzai Runner (1987) – Beck Baxter
- Caught (1987) – Tim Devon
- The Hunt for Red October (1990) – Foxtrot Pilot
- Deep Cover (1992) – Undercover Cop (uncredited)
- Down Periscope (1996) – Young Sailor
- The Ride (1997) – Staff #1
- Bless the Child (2000) – Mr. Czernik
- The Climb (2002) – Pastor
- Bobby Jones: Stroke of Genius (2004) – Bob Woodruff
- Crystal Lake Memories: The Complete History of Friday the 13th (2013) – Himself (Documentary film)

=== Television ===
John Shepherd television credits
Year	Title	Role	Notes
1978	The Phantom of the Open Hearth	Young Ralph Parker	TV movie
1979	California Fever	Don	1 episode
1981	240-Robert	Chris	1 episode
1981	The Other Victim	Steve Langford	TV movie
1982	T.J. Hooker	David Wagner	1 episode
1983	Confessions of a Married Man	Tom	TV movie
1983	Close Ties	Thayer	TV movie
1987	The Kidnapping of Baby John Doe	Friend as Party	TV movie
1988	Friday the 13th: The Series	Constable	1 episode
1988	Hot Paint	Unknown	TV movie
1988	High Mountain Rangers	Hank Rassy	1 episode
1988	Frank Nitti: The Enforcer	Unknown	TV movie
1988	I'll Be Home for Christmas	Greg	TV movie
1989	Tour of Duty	Specialist Taft	1 episode
1989	The Equalizer	Michael Gianelli	Episode: "Heart of Justice"
1990	Quantum Leap	Thomas	1 episode
1990	Road to Avonlea	Henry	1 episode
1990	Rock Hudson	Captain of 'Fighter Squadron'	TV movie
1990	Shannon's Deal	Unknown	1 episode
1991	The Heroes of Desert Storm	Unknown	TV movie
1991	Mark Twain and Me	Oxford Dean	TV movie
2009	His Name Was Jason: 30 Years of Friday the 13th	Himself	Documentary film
