= Tim Ballard =

Founder and former CEO of Operation Underground Railroad

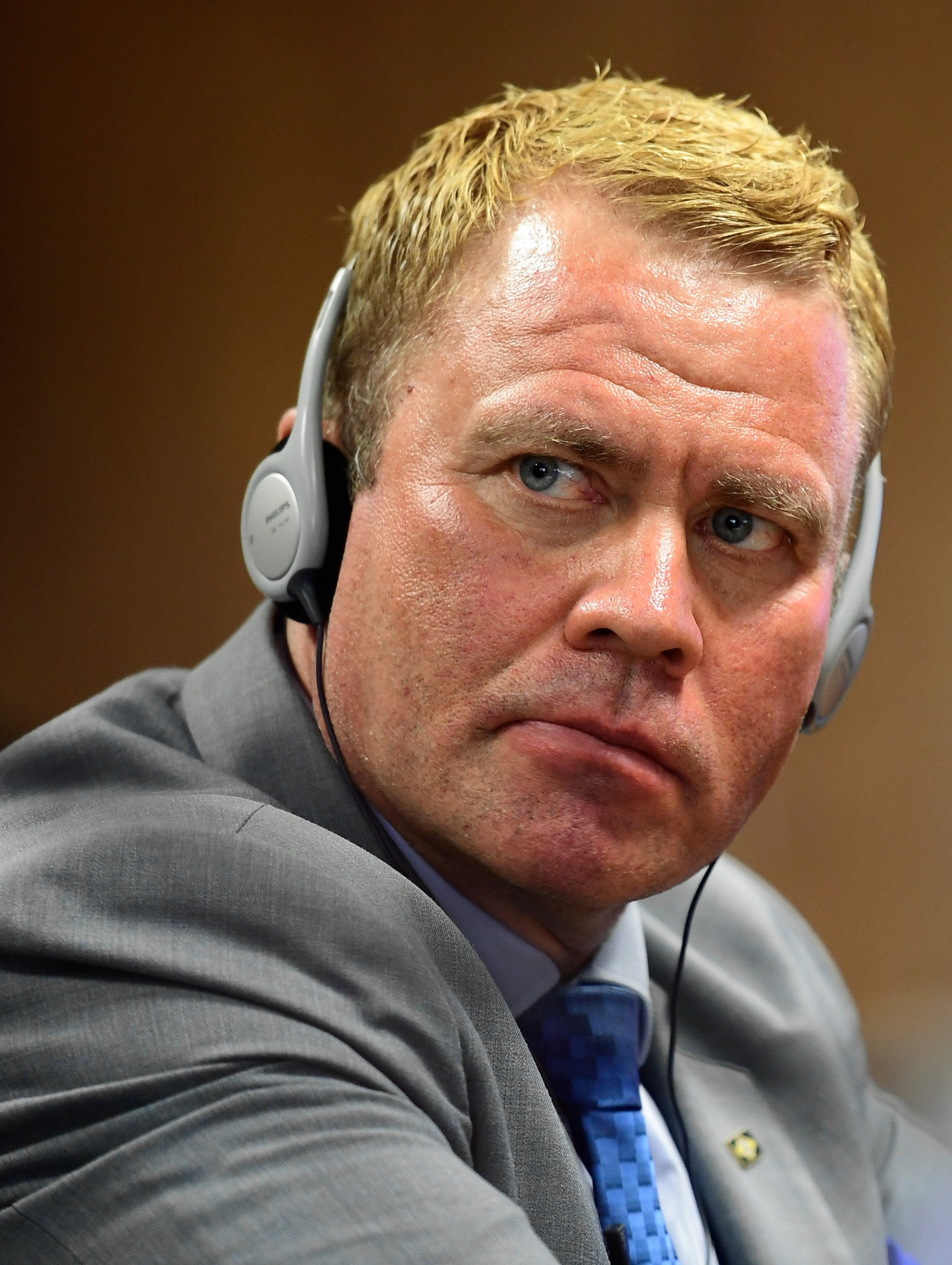
- Ballard in 2025
- Born: Timothy Ballard; Provo, Utah, U.S.
- Education: Brigham Young University (BA); Monterey Institute of International Studies (MA)
- Known for: Founder of Operation Underground Railroad
- Spouse: Katherine Ballard
- Children: 9 (2 adopted)
- Website: timothyballard.com

Timothy Ballard is the founder and former CEO of Operation Underground Railroad (O.U.R.), an anti-sex trafficking organization. The 2023 thriller film Sound of Freedom stars Jim Caviezel in the role of Ballard who embarks on a mission to rescue children from sex traffickers. The film became one of the highest-grossing independent releases of 2023, earning over $250 million worldwide and bringing widespread public attention to the issue of child sex trafficking.

Ballard was removed as CEO and forced to leave O.U.R. in July 2023 amid an investigation into sexual misconduct allegations involving at least seven women, according to NBC News. In a December 2023 statement, O.U.R. said an independent law firm reached the conclusion that Ballard had "engaged in unprofessional behavior that violated O.U.R.'s policies and values". Ballard has denied the allegations. In November 2025, the Salt Lake County District Attorney declined to file charges against him, citing "insufficient admissible evidence", and in January 2026 the Utah County Attorney's Office also declined to file charges. Several civil claims against him have been dismissed, while others remain pending.

== Early life and education ==
Ballard grew up in California and graduated from La Cañada High School in 1994. As a member of The Church of Jesus Christ of Latter-day Saints, he served a two-year mission to Chile. This experience gave him fluency in Spanish and a connection to vulnerable communities in Latin America. Afterwards, he attended Brigham Young University (BYU) and graduated with a Bachelor of Arts in Spanish and political science. He then obtained a Master of Arts in international politics from the Monterey Institute of International Studies (now part of Middlebury College).

== Federal service ==
According to Ballard, he worked in the Department of Homeland Security and was assigned to the Internet Crimes Against Children Task Force. Over approximately twelve years as a special agent, he conducted undercover operations targeting international child exploitation networks, collaborating with law enforcement across more than thirty countries. He has described this period as formative in his decision to found a private organization capable of acting with greater operational flexibility.

== Operation Underground Railroad ==
Ballard founded the non-profit organization Operation Underground Railroad (O.U.R.) in 2013. The organization's mission is to support local and international law enforcement in identifying, rescuing, and rehabilitating victims of sex trafficking. It operates across multiple continents and has developed law enforcement training programs in Latin America, Asia, and Africa. He has claimed that his organization has rescued thousands of trafficking victims. He was invited by Donald Trump to join a White House anti-trafficking advisory board.

On May 14, 2015, Ballard testified before the United States Congress House Foreign Affairs Subcommittee on Global Human Rights during which he recommended procedures and practices for rescuing children from trafficking rings. The hearing focused on partnerships between the US government and non-governmental organizations that rescue trafficking victims. On March 6, 2019, Ballard testified before the US Senate Judiciary Committee about US-Mexico border security and its relation to child sex trafficking. As early as 2016, Ballard was criticized for broadcasting raids without regard for victim privacy.

In October 2020, the Attorney's Office of Davis County, Utah initiated an investigation into complaints that O.U.R. and Ballard had conducted illegal fundraising efforts. No charges were filed and the investigation was closed on March 28, 2023.

In 2021, Ballard paid himself $355,000 in salary and compensation as CEO of O.U.R. In 2022, his salary had risen to $546,548.

KSL.com reported that documents from a now-closed local and federal investigation into O.U.R. showed that former employees were concerned that Ballard may have misled donors by making exaggerated claims about the organization’s work. The prior board consisted entirely of relatives and close friends of Ballard, according to Vice News, and court filings in the lawsuits against him have alleged that former board members were aware of complaints against Ballard and failed to take appropriate action to protect the plaintiffs.

Ballard and supporters of O.U.R. have been accused of promoting the QAnon conspiracy theory as early as 2020. In July 2023, the month Sound of Freedom was released, Ballard stated that this claim is not true and is being used to discredit him and the film. In an interview with Jordan Peterson the same month, Ballard claimed, without evidence, to have recently raided a West African "baby factory", where children were sold for organ harvesting and Satanic ritual abuse, a claim that echoed a QAnon conspiracy theory.

In a December 2025 podcast interview, Ballard alleged that OUR Rescue (formerly Operation Underground Railroad) had purchased Google ads using his name and redirected donors searching for him to their organization. In January 2026, Ballard posted on X that a forthcoming “OUR-Rescue Fraud” video would accuse OUR Rescue of misuse of donor funds, communications fraud, and other misconduct, and said a legal team believed the organization had violated the Trafficking Victims Protection Act.

=== Sexual misconduct allegations and resignation ===
Ballard was removed as CEO and forced to leave O.U.R. in 2023. At the time, Vice reported that employees and donors to an anti-child trafficking non-profit, Operation Underground Railroad, received a letter making the claim that Ballard had recently left the organization following internally-investigated claims made against him by employees, later reporting that his departure had followed "allegations of sexual misconduct." The contents of the anonymous letter were published in full on September 17; it alleged a pattern of grooming and manipulation of women affiliated with the organization. Vice News reported that O.U.R. had investigated claims of sexual misconduct involving seven women, a number the outlet said was believed to be higher because it counted employees but not contractors or volunteers. According to the report, Ballard invited women to act as his “wife” on undercover overseas missions ostensibly aimed at rescuing trafficking victims, and then allegedly coerced them into sharing a bed or showering together on the claim that it was necessary to fool traffickers. The report said Ballard sent at least one woman a photo of himself in his underwear and asked another “how far she was willing to go” to save children. The letter said the investigation had revealed, through “disturbingly specific and parallel accounts,” that Ballard had been “deceitfully and extensively grooming and manipulating multiple women ... with the ultimate intent of coercing them to participate in sexual acts with him”.

In the same week that the allegations were made public, The Church of Jesus Christ of Latter-day Saints publicly denounced Ballard, stating that he had used the name of church leader M. Russell Ballard (no relation) for personal gain, and called his conduct "morally unacceptable.” The governor of Utah, Spencer Cox, called the sexual misconduct allegations "disturbing" and "unconscionable" if true. Ballard denied the accusations, saying that "they are baseless inventions designed to destroy me and the movement we have built to end the trafficking and exploitation of vulnerable children."

On September 28, several former employees and former contractors released a statement through attorney Suzette Rasmussen affirming the allegations against Ballard, stating that they were "subjected to sexual harassment, spiritual manipulation, grooming, and sexual misconduct." That same morning, O.U.R. released a statement confirming that they had launched an investigation into the allegations when they were first made, and that at the conclusion of that investigation, Ballard resigned.

=== Lawsuits and investigations ===
The Associated Press reported that women had accused Ballard of “exploiting his position as founder of Operation Underground Railroad and their desire to help combat child trafficking to abuse them.”

On October 9, 2023, five women filed a lawsuit against Operation Underground Railroad founder Tim Ballard, alleging he sexually assaulted them while they worked for the organization and made "fraudulent statements about the so-called 'couples ruse' to coerce them into sexual contact." The complaint alleged that the ruse was "institutional doctrine" of O.U.R. and its affiliated companies, and that Ballard had women "practice" it before missions, flying them "across the country" for "tantric yoga, couples massages with escorts and lap dancing on Ballard's lap." It alleged that Ballard pressured undercover operatives who were posing as his wife "to get in the shower together or share a bed with him," and that he "participated in several sexual acts ... in various states of undress." The complaint alleged that Ballard falsely claimed he had been given permission by church leaders to use the ruse "as long as there was no sexual intercourse or kissing on the lips."

On October 11, 2023, a married couple filed a lawsuit against O.U.R. and Ballard, accusing Ballard of sexual assault and grooming. In a statement in the lawsuit, the husband alleged that Ballard wanted his wife to help O.U.R., despite her having "no training in any sort of undercover work." The lawsuit went on to state that Ballard began abusing the "couples ruse", in which Ballard had women pose undercover as his wife or girlfriend to fool traffickers on purported rescue missions, and used it as a tool for sexual grooming. It also accused Ballard of "encouraging women to travel around the country with him to practice the couples ruse, including participating in tantric yoga, couples massages and going to strip clubs."

In a video posted to Instagram on September 24, 2023, Ballard said the ruse was used by himself and other operatives posing as potential clients of sex traffickers, and that having a woman pose as an operative's partner gave the men "cover to decline" offers of sex. "So, the trafficker sees the situation and recognizes that I have every excuse not to partake," he said. He said that "hundreds, maybe thousands" of children had been rescued using the tactic. KSL reported that Ballard's statement "did not address why the 'couples ruse' would necessitate showering together."

On November 20, 2023, Jordana Bree Righter filed a separate lawsuit in Utah's Third Judicial District Court against Ballard – both individually and as alleged alter ego of O.U.R. and of Deacon, Inc., a Nevada corporation – and against Matthew Cooper, described in the complaint as a current or former O.U.R. employee. The complaint pleads six causes of action: sexual assault and battery against Cooper, conspiracy to commit battery against O.U.R., Ballard, and Cooper, fraud against Ballard and Cooper, negligence against all defendants, premises liability against O.U.R., and piercing the corporate veil against the corporate defendants.

In January 2024, one of Ballard's accusers filed additional criminal complaints of sexual assault in four California jurisdictions. This was followed by a Federal suit in October under the Victims of Trafficking and Violence Protection Act of 2000.

In February 2024, Colombian woman Kely Johana Suarez Moya filed a lawsuit against Ballard, his wife Katherine, OUR, and Angel Studios, alleging defamatory portrayal of a character in Sound of Freedom that she claimed was based on her. In September 2024, Moya was convicted in Colombia of inciting prostitution and child procurement related to a 2014 incident involving the OUR sting operation.

The October 2024 federal lawsuit alleged that Ballard engaged in sex trafficking. According to the complaint, as reported by Rolling Stone, the women were “coerced into performing sex, labor, and services for [Ballard’s] personal benefit and the benefit of OUR,” sometimes endured violent sexual assault, or had sex with Ballard while Cooper was present, and were told the conduct was “necessary to rescue children.” The complaint further alleged that Ballard and his associates laundered money to hire sex workers while on missions abroad and that O.U.R. “actively participated in the solicitation, recruitment, and exploitation” of female operatives. It also alleged that Ballard justified extramarital sex by saying that a psychic medium he regularly consulted told him he was a “prophet” and did not have to follow rules.

Also in October 2024, Ballard filed a defamation lawsuit in Utah’s Fourth District Court against six women who had accused him of misconduct. The complaint denies all of the allegations and alleges a coordinated effort to damage him after public figures in Utah had encouraged him to run for the U.S. Senate.

In November 2025, Salt Lake County District Attorney Sim Gill declined to file criminal charges against Tim Ballard related to allegations of sexual assault, stating that his office lacked sufficient corroborating evidence to meet the burden of proof. Gill emphasized that the decision applied only to incidents alleged to have occurred within Salt Lake County, and that the decision did not diminish the credibility of the complainants. Allegations involving incidents in Utah County and California were not addressed by the declination.

Jordana Bree Righter, who was hired as an independent contractor for O.U.R., alleged in her November 2023 lawsuit that she “was required to go to a strip club in Salt Lake City so that she could prove herself to Tim Ballard and Matt Cooper, where she was sexually touched under false pretense”. On June 27, 2024, the court dismissed Jordana Bree Righter's lawsuit.

In July 2025, Third District Judge Todd Shaughnessy dismissed with prejudice the claims of Ballard's former executive assistant Celeste Borys, after finding that she had improperly accessed Ballard's email and electronic files after leaving the organization. On June 29, 2026, U.S. District Judge Robert Shelby also dismissed her federal claims with prejudice. Borys is appealing, and another lawsuit against Ballard remains ongoing.

In January 2026, the Utah County Attorney's Office declined to file charges over Borys's allegation, concluding that there was not a reasonable likelihood of success at trial.

== Post-excommunication statements and disputes with the LDS Church ==
Following the allegations and subsequent legal proceedings, Ballard made a series of public statements and media appearances in which he accused leaders of the Church of Jesus Christ of Latter-day Saints of defaming him and argued that his excommunication was the result of a broader conspiracy. These claims, made in interviews and on social media, were widely reported by regional and international media. Church officials rejected Ballard's assertions, stating that his conduct was “morally unacceptable” and denying any institutional association with him.

In November 2025, Ballard escalated his accusations by claiming that what he described as a “deep church” network within The Church of Jesus Christ of Latter-day Saints had orchestrated a coordinated campaign against him. He alleged that “unauthorized entities within the Church” conspired to defame him, sabotage his prospective U.S. Senate bid, interfere with the distribution of films associated with him, and ultimately force his excommunication.

In October 2026, Ballard accused LDS Church leaders of conspiring to derail his proposed U.S. Senate campaign.

In October 2026, The Salt Lake Tribune reported that in a nearly four-hour Backfire video posted to YouTube, Ballard alleged for the first time that the church had sought to hide child abuse, saying he had given a member of the Quorum of the Twelve Apostles "an abundance of evidence about child abuse in the church ranks being covered up" and had been told "Don't go down this rabbit hole." He also said that individuals at church headquarters had worked to prevent his U.S. Senate candidacy. A church spokesperson did not respond to the accusations; the church has stated that it has "zero tolerance" for abuse. Ballard's attorney said Ballard had intended to sue the church but had so far chosen not to. The same day, Ballard responded on Instagram and Facebook, thanking the Tribune "for being (probably) the first Utah outlet to just state the facts on this epic issue" and writing, "I DO stand by EVERYTHING I stated in Backfire."

== Other work ==
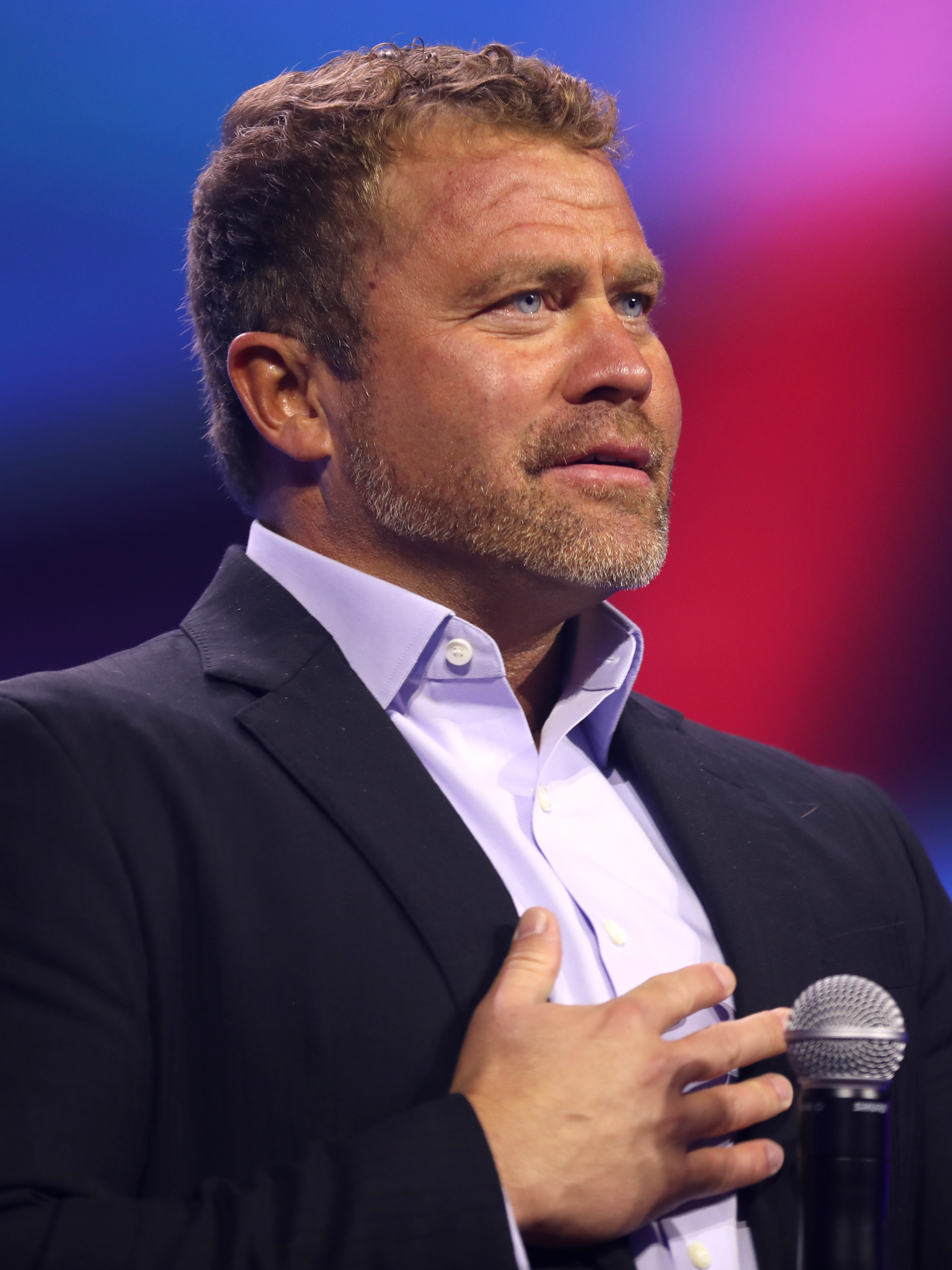
Ballard speaking at Turning Point Action in 2023

Ballard was the former CEO of The Nazarene Fund, a Glenn Beck-backed anti-trafficking organization.

The SPEAR Fund, an anti-trafficking organization Ballard worked with after leaving O.U.R., removed information from its website that described him as a senior adviser to the group, Rolling Stone reported.

=== Media appearances ===
The 2016 documentary The Abolitionists, produced by Gerald Molen, featured the first operations undertaken by Ballard and Operation Underground Railroad. Another documentary from director Nick Nanton, Operation Toussaint, was produced in 2018 which featured an operation in Haiti that had the support of Haitian President Jovenel Moïse and former US congresswoman Mia Love of Utah.

ESPN featured Ballard and Pittsburgh Steelers' head coach Mike Tomlin in a piece which highlighted the restavek issue near the border of Haiti and the Dominican Republic. Tomlin would also write the foreword to Ballard's book Slave Stealers: True Accounts of Slave Rescues – Then and Now.

A feature film, Sound of Freedom, starring Jim Caviezel as Ballard, was announced in 2018 and released in theaters in 2023.

Hidden War (2025) promotional poster

Hidden War (2025) – a documentary film. The film received a limited theatrical release. According to publicly available box-office data, domestic box-office revenue was not reported, and reported worldwide gross was approximately US$4,561.

=== Backfire ===
Backfire is a multi-episode video series, released beginning in November 2025. The series presents Ballard's account of his September 2023 excommunication from The Church of Jesus Christ of Latter-day Saints, related legal matters, and his allegations of a coordinated campaign by what he terms the “Deep Church.”

==== Episode 1 ====
- First public release: November 19, 2025
- Primary distribution:
  - Official X (Twitter) post by @TimBallard: https://x.com/TimBallard/status/1991276537702932813 (posted 22:44 UTC, November 19, 2025)
  - Official YouTube channel (Official Tim Ballard)

In the episode, Ballard states that President M. Russell Ballard (then Acting President of the Quorum of the Twelve Apostles) was his “best friend” and “like a grandpa” to him. He further claims that M. Russell Ballard continued to contact him into August 2023 and had not severed the relationship, contrasting this with the Church's September 2023 public statement that the association had already ended earlier due to unauthorized use of the apostle's name and activity regarded as morally unacceptable.

Ballard frames the episode as the beginning of a larger narrative he calls “Operation Millstone” and asserts that the events described form part of a systemic pattern he labels “Lukewarmism.”

==== Subsequent episodes and status ====
Release dates of Backfire episodes, and run times of Episodes 1–8 as uploaded to YouTube on September 20, 2026.

Later episodes (including Episode 2 “Who Shot the First Bullet,” Episode 3 “The Kangaroo Court,” and subsequent installments) expanded on legal proceedings, undercover operational claims, and broader conspiracy allegations. By early 2026, Ballard indicated that remaining episodes of Backfire and a parallel series titled Rescue Fraud were being prepared, with material intended for adaptation into Sound of Freedom sequels. In a September 22, 2026 Facebook video, the on-screen captions read: "I can't wait for you to see Sound of Freedom two or three and the book coming out, The Cost of Freedom, A True Story Based on a Lie starring Trader D".

The original short-form YouTube upload of Episode 1 was later restricted or made private on some platforms, while the X post and video remained publicly accessible. Longer compilation versions and versions with subtitles have also been released on Ballard's official channels.

In the September 2026 compilation video, Ballard says that Kevin Pearson "orders a hit on an innocent woman who used to work for me in Provo". He says that "the area president, Kevin Pearson" sent "a man named Kevin Hamilton" to "do the hit job" that led to his excommunication, and that he believes Hamilton "instructed the state president that he is allowed to override the words of Jesus". He adds: "If Kevin Hamilton is correct, he's saying that Jesus Christ ordered a lie to be sent to a tabloid magazine owned by George Soros, that Jesus Christ ordered Tim Ballard to be excommunicated while violating his own words, that Jesus Christ conspired against the rescue of children."

In Backfire Episode 7, "The Hope" (part of the September 4, 2026 compilation, later posted separately on YouTube and, on September 30, 2026, on Facebook), Ballard describes Elder Jack N. Gerard, whom he identifies as having been executive director of the Church's communication department at the time, as "a righteous watchman on the tower" while saying "I've never met this person. He's never said a word to me." He says he "only could imagine that he fought for me" in the 2023 decision, says "I don't know what his intent was, but we'll find out through discovery," and plays excerpts of Gerard's April 2024 general conference talk "Integrity: A Christlike Attribute" as referring to that decision.

== Personal life ==
Ballard and his wife Katherine met at Brigham Young University. They have been married for over 20 years with nine children, two of whom were adopted from a sting operation in Haiti. As of 2015, their family resided in Utah. Ballard was a member of The Church of Jesus Christ of Latter-day Saints but was excommunicated in September 2023. The church denounced Ballard's attempt to claim that the "Couple's Ruse" was authorized.

=== Friendships ===
Ballard was close friends with Utah Attorney General Sean Reyes. In December 2023, Reyes publicly stated that he believed the women who accused Ballard of sexual misconduct, saying that after hearing their accounts in person he was “heartbroken” for what they endured, and apologizing for his prior association with Ballard, which he said may have contributed to an environment in which they felt powerless to come forward.

Ballard was a longtime close friend of political commentator Glenn Beck. In October 2023, Beck publicly denounced Ballard on his podcast, stating that he felt “completely duped,” that Ballard's story “started to fall apart,” and that he no longer believed Ballard was being truthful after reviewing evidence related to allegations of sexual misconduct.

Ballard was also a former friend of M. Russell Ballard, who was the Acting President of the Quorum of the Twelve Apostles within the LDS Church until his death in November 2023, a position he had held since January 2018. However, their friendship ended when M. Russell Ballard became aware of Tim Ballard's alleged misconduct. In a September 2026 video responding to his excommunication, Ballard disputed this account, describing him as his "best friend" and saying the two remained in contact after the date the Church says their association ended.

In the “Backfire Docu Series,” Ballard claims Sherri Dew as a friend.

In a September 22, 2026 Instagram video, Ballard addressed Matt Holland, whom he called "a friend of mine" and identified as the son of Jeffrey R. Holland, and urged him to publicly state whether he had agreed with decisions made in Church meetings in the fall of 2023.

== Bibliography ==
- The Covenant (2012). Title of Liberty Press. ISBN 978-0-9883-7510-9
- The Lincoln Hypothesis: A Modern-day Abolitionist Investigates the Possible Connection between Joseph Smith, the Book of Mormon, and Abraham Lincoln (2016). Deseret Book Company. ISBN 978-1-6297-2179-8
- Slave Stealers: True Accounts of Slave Rescues: Then and Now (2018). Shadow Mountain. ISBN 9781629724843
- The Washington Hypothesis: A Modern-Day Investigator Explores the Possible Connection Between the American Covenant, Latter-day Temples, and George Washington (2018). Deseret Book Company. ISBN 978-1-6297-2452-2
- The Covenant, One Nation under God: America's Sacred & Immutable Connection to Ancient Israel (2019). Legends Library Press. ISBN 978-1-9377-3520-3
- Ballard, Timothy; Brunson, Russell; Nanton, Nick. Operation Toussaint (2019) Morgan James Publishing. ISBN 978-1-6427-9269-0
- The Pilgrim Hypothesis (2020). Covenant Communications, Inc. ISBN 978-1-5244-1282-1
- The American Covenant Vol 1: One Nation under God: Establishment, Discovery and Revolution (2020). Digital Legend Press. ISBN 978-1-9345-3728-2
- The American Covenant Volume 2: The Constitution, The Civil War, and our fight to preserve the Covenant today (2020). Digital Legend Press. ISBN 978-1934537282
