= Laurie Holden =

American-Canadian actress (born 1969)

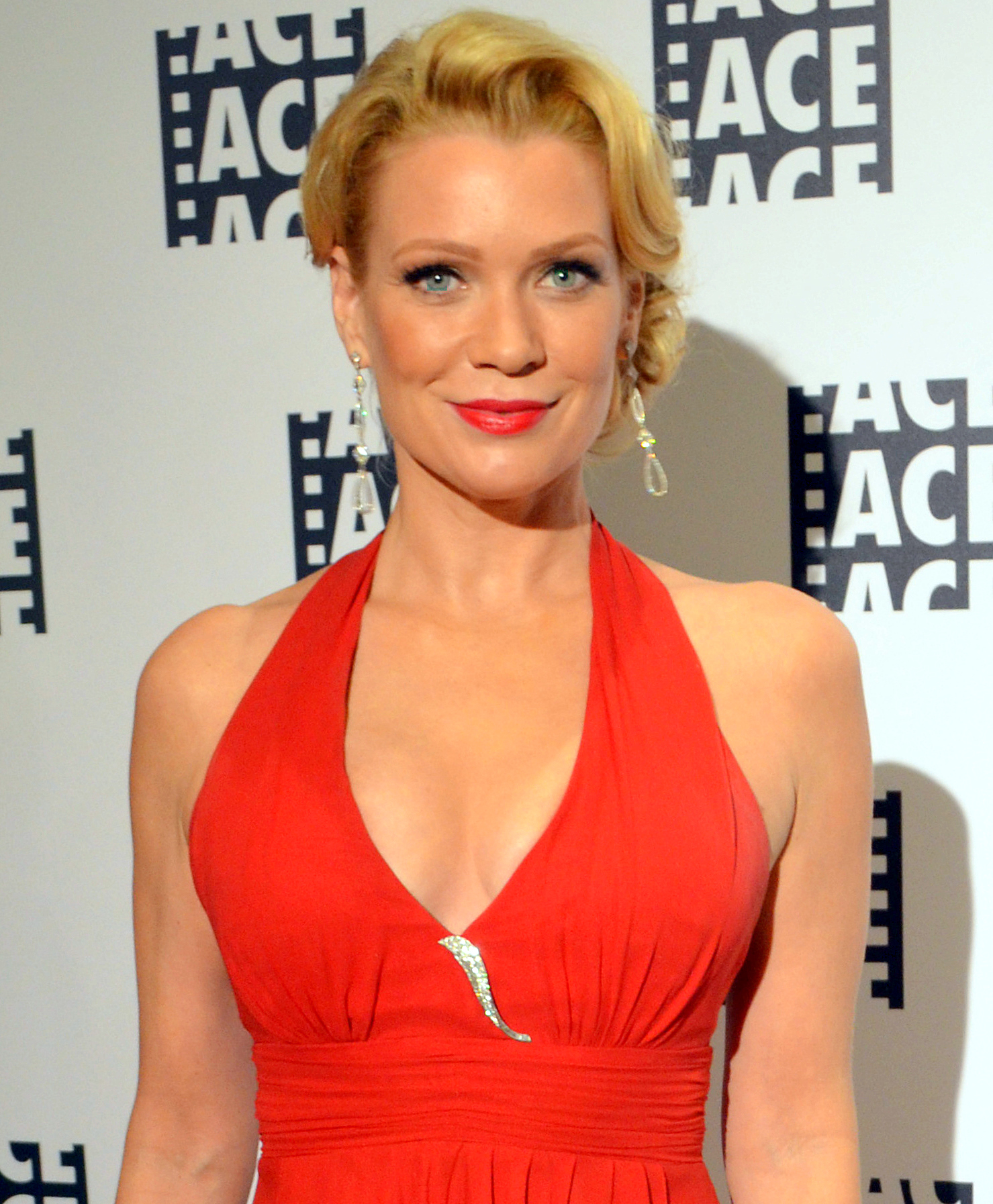
- Holden at the ACE Eddie Awards in 2012
- Born: Heather Laurie Holden; December 17, 1969 (age 56); Los Angeles, California, U.S.
- Education: McGill University; University of California, Los Angeles (BA); Columbia University (MA)
- Occupations: Actress; producer; model; human rights activist
- Years active: 1980–present
- Mother: Adrienne Ellis
- Relatives: Michael Anderson (stepfather), Michael Anderson Jr. (stepbrother)

Heather Laurie Holden (born December 17, 1969) is an American-Canadian actress, producer, model, and human rights activist. She is best known for portraying Marita Covarrubias in The X-Files (1996–2002) and Andrea in AMC's The Walking Dead (2010–2013). She has also had recurring roles in acclaimed television series such as The Shield (2008), The Americans (2017–2018), and The Boys (2022).

In film, she played Cybil Bennett in Silent Hill (2006) and Amanda Dumfries in The Mist (2007).

== Early life ==
Born in Los Angeles, California, and raised in Toronto, Holden holds dual citizenship in the United States and Canada.

Holden attended McGill University, where she studied economics and political science. She transferred to University of California, Los Angeles and received a degree in theater and film in 1993. At UCLA, she was a member of the National Honor Society and received the Natalie Wood Acting Award. Holden then pursued a master's degree in human rights at Columbia University.

== Career ==
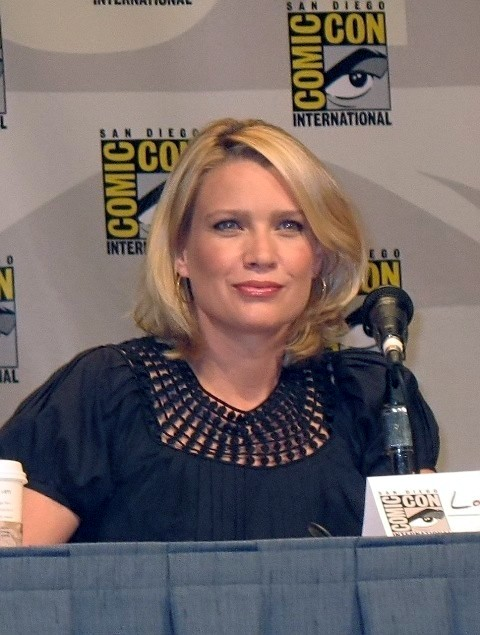
Holden at San Diego Comic-Con in 2007 to promote The Mist

Early in her career, Holden made a name for herself by co-starring opposite Burt Reynolds in Physical Evidence (1989), Vanessa Redgrave in Young Catherine (1991), and William Shatner in the TV Movie TekWar: TekLab (1994). She also played Mabel Dunham in the TV Movie The Pathfinder (1996) (based on the novel of James Fenimore Cooper). Onstage, she starred in Time and the Conways, written by J. B. Priestley, and The Winter's Tale, based on the play by William Shakespeare. Other stage roles include Regina in Ghosts and Procne in The Love of the Nightingale. After making various guest appearances on Due South, Murder, She Wrote, and Poltergeist: The Legacy (when she played a dual role), Holden found some success playing a recurring role on the seminal sci-fi series The X-Files: Marita Covarrubias, a mysterious government worker who becomes an informant to Special Agent Fox Mulder, from seasons four through nine (1996–2002). She also had a supporting role, as Mary Travis, opposite Michael Biehn and Ron Perlman, in the CBS TV series based on the MGM classic, The Magnificent Seven (1998–2000) and a role as Debra Campbell on Highlander: The Series.

Some of Holden's most notable roles include starring opposite Jim Carrey in Frank Darabont's film The Majestic (2001) (It was while performing on stage in Cat on a Hot Tin Roof, that Holden was discovered by Darabont). As Carrey's long lost love, she received critical acclaim for her performance. She also co-starred alongside Dean Cain, Jennifer Tilly, and Tim Curry in the Canadian comedy Bailey's Billion$. Other movie roles have included those of Michael Chiklis' character's former love interest in Fantastic Four (2005), Cybil Bennett in Christophe Gans' artistic-horror video game adaptation of Silent Hill (2006), Amanda Dumfries in The Mist (2007).

In 2008, she joined the final season of TV Series The Shield, where she played Olivia Murray.

From 2010 to 2013, she played the role of Andrea, a civil rights attorney and survivor of a global zombie plague in The Walking Dead, an AMC television horror drama series. In 2013, she worked on the movie Honeytrap as an executive producer. In 2014 she played the role of Ann McGinnis in the third season of Major Crimes. Also in 2014, she co-starred in the movie Dumb and Dumber To, opposite Jim Carrey, Jeff Daniels and Kathleen Turner. She played Adele Pinchelow, the main antagonist of the Farrelly brothers comedy.

In 2015, she appeared as Dr. Hannah Tramble, an ER surgeon, in the third season of Chicago Fire. It was announced Holden would reprise her role as Dr. Tramble in a planned spinoff, Chicago Med. Holden was set to co-star opposite S. Epatha Merkerson and Yaya DaCosta in the ensemble medical drama. The series is being conceived and written by Chicago Fire creators/executive producers Derek Haas and Michael Brandt. However, she dropped out of the project for "family reasons".

In 2016, she appeared in The Abolitionists, a documentary film by Darrin Fletcher. In 2017, Holden joins the cast of The Americans in the fifth season, when she plays Renee. She was cast in indie thriller Pyewacket, a movie directed by Adam MacDonald.

In 2018, Laurie Holden appeared in the crime thriller Dragged Across Concrete, starring Mel Gibson and Vince Vaughn.

Holden joined the cast of American legal drama television series Proven Innocent (which premiered in 2019 on Fox), where she plays Greta Bellows.

In 2022, she joins The Boys season 3, in the role of Crimson Countess, while also performing the songs "America's Son" and "Chimps Don't Cry".

== Charity work and human rights activism ==
Holden campaigns against sex trafficking and is a founding board member of the Canadian Somaly Mam Foundation, which campaigns against human trafficking, and an advisory board member of the Somaly Mam Foundation in the U.S.

In 2014, Holden worked with Operation Underground Railroad, a volunteer organization that aims to hunt down and arrest child sex traffickers. The group aided authorities in Cartagena, Colombia, in arresting five sex-traffickers and rescuing underage girls.

== Filmography ==
=== Film ===
Year	Title	Role	Notes
1986	Separate Vacations	Karen	
1989	Physical Evidence	Matt's Girl	
1995	Expect No Mercy	Vicki	
1996	Past Perfect	Ally Marsey	
2001	The Majestic	Adele Stanton	
2004	Meet Market	Billy	Uncredited
2005	Bailey's Billion$	Marge Maggs	
2005	Fantastic Four	Debbie McIlvane	
2006	Silent Hill	Cybil Bennett	
2007	The Mist	Amanda Dumfries	
2014	Honeytrap	—N/a	Executive producer
2014	Dumb and Dumber To	Adele Pinchelow	
2016	The Abolitionists	Herself	Documentary
2017	The Time of Their Lives	—N/a	Executive producer
2017	Pyewacket	Mrs. Reyes	
2018	Dragged Across Concrete	Melanie Ridgeman	
2019	Arctic Dogs	Dakota	Voice
2022	Fireheart	Pauline	Voice

=== Television ===
Year	Title	Role	Notes
1980	The Martian Chronicles	Marie Wilder	Television miniseries
1988	Captain Power and the Soldiers of the Future	Erin	Episode: "Gemini and Counting"
1991	Young Catherine	Princess Catherine Dashkova	2 episodes
1991	Father Dowling Mysteries	Joyce Morrison / Judith Carswell	Episode: "The Hardboiled Mystery"
1993	Secret Services	Suki	Episode: "Larceny Inc./Reach Out and Rob Someone/Jet Threat"
1993	Scales of Justice	Nancy Oakes	Episode: "Who Killed Sir Harry Oakes?"
1993	Family Passions	Claire	Season 1
1993	Destiny Ridge	Darlene Kubolek	Season 2
1994	TekWar	Rachel Tudor	Episode: "TekLab"
1995	Due South	Jill Kennedy	Episode: "Letting Go"
1995–1996	Highlander: The Series	Debra Campbell	2 episodes
1996	Murder, She Wrote	Sherri Sampson	Episode: "What You Don't Know Can Kill You"
1996	Poltergeist: The Legacy	Cora Jennings / Sarah Browning	Episode: "Thirteenth Generation"
1996	Two	Madeline Reynolds	Episode: "Many Happing Return"
1996	The Pathfinder	Mabel Dunham	Television film
1996–2002	The X-Files	Marita Covarrubias	10 episodes
1997	Dead Man's Gun	Bonnie Lorrine	Episode: "Fool's Gold"
1997	Echo	Scarlett Antonelli	Television film
1997	Alibi	Beth Polasky	Television film
1998–2000	The Magnificent Seven	Mary Travis	18 episodes
2000	The Outer Limits	Susan McLaren	Episode: "Breaking Point"
2000	The Man Who Used to Be Me	Amy Ryan	Television film
2001	Big Sound	Piper Moran	Episode: "Shabbas Bloody Shabbas"
2008	The Shield	Olivia Murray	13 episodes
2010–2013	The Walking Dead	Andrea	Main cast; 31 episodes (Starring; seasons 1–3)
2014–2015	Major Crimes	Ann McGinnis	3 episodes
2015	Chicago Fire	Dr. Hannah Tramble	Episode: "I am the Apocalypse"
2017–2018	The Americans	Renee	12 episodes
2019	Proven Innocent	Greta Bellows	7 episodes
2022	The Boys	Crimson Countess / Fox Crimson Countess (voice)	5 episodes

=== Video game ===
Year	Title	Voice role	Notes
2004	The X-Files: Resist or Serve	Marita Covarrubias	

=== Online ===
Year	Title	Role	Notes
2021	Vought News Network: Seven on 7 with Cameron Coleman	Crimson Countess	Guest role; web series promoting The Boys

== Theatre ==
- The Only Game in Town (2000), based on the play by Frank D. Gilroy
- Cat on a Hot Tin Roof (2000), based on the play by Tennessee Williams
- The Love of the Nightingale, based on the play Procne by Timberlake Wertenbaker
- Ghosts, based on the play Regina by Henrik Ibsen
- Toros Y Hevos
- A Chorus Line, based on the book Kristine by James Kirkwood, Jr. and Nicholas Dante
- The Winter's Tale, based on the play Hermione by William Shakespeare
- Time and the Conways, based on the play Madge by J. B. Priestley

== Awards and nominations ==
Holden was named as one of the top 100 Most Creative People in Hollywood in Entertainment Weekly's It List and One of Ten Actors to Watch by Variety. She also won "The Look of The Year" Elite model search in Toronto and was nominated in 1996 for a Gemini Award for Best Performance by an Actress in a Guest Role in a Dramatic Series for Due South (1994). Laurie is named as one of "Ten Actors To Watch" by Variety in 2002.

She was nominated in 2011 for a Saturn Award for Best Supporting Actress in Television for the series The Walking Dead. For her role in this series, she was also nominated in 2011 for the Scream Award for Best Supporting Actress.

In 2013, Laurie Holden won the Saturn Award for Best Supporting Actress for her work on The Walking Dead.

Year	Award	Category	Work	Result
1986	Look of the Year			Won
1993	Natalie Wood Acting Award	Natalie Wood Acting Award for Best Actress		Won
1996	Gemini Award	Gemini Award for Best Guest Star in Television	Due South	Nominated
2011	Saturn Award	Best Supporting Actress on Television	The Walking Dead	Nominated
2011	Scream Award	Best Supporting Actress on Television	The Walking Dead	Nominated
2012	Satellite Award	Best Cast – Television Series	The Walking Dead	Won
2013	Saturn Award	Best Supporting Actress on Television	The Walking Dead	Won
2019	Screen Actors Guild Award	Outstanding Performance by an Ensemble in a Drama Series	The Americans	Nominated
2020	CinEuphoria Awards	Merit – Honorary Award	The Walking Dead	Won
