= Nick Nanton =

American film director and producer

- Nanton with his family at an event in 2019
- Born: Barbados
- Education: BSBA in finance; JD
- Alma mater: University of Florida
- Occupations: Branding agency former executive; author; producer; director; lawyer; TV host
- Years active: 2005–present
- Organizations: Dicks Nanton Agency; Celebrity Branding Agency; DNA Films; Astonish Entertainment; Abundance Studios
- Spouse: Kristina Nanton
- Children: 3
- Website: nicknanton.com

Nick Nanton is an American author and director and producer of film and television projects. He is the co-founder and CEO of the production company DNA Films, has produced and directed documentary films including Dickie V, Operation Toussaint, Rudy Ruettiger: The Walk On, Visioneer, and A New Leash on Life: The K9s for Warriors Story. He is also the former CEO of the Dicks + Nanton Agency, a celebrity branding agency that he co-founded with his business partner J.W. Dicks in Winter Park, Florida.

He is the host of the Amazon Prime Video interview series, In Case You Didn't Know with Nick Nanton. He has won 24 Emmy Awards, in multiple regions across the United States, and received national and regional Emmy nominations for his work in film and television. He is the author of multiple books including Celebrity Branding You and Story Selling.

== Early life and education ==
Nanton was born in Barbados and immigrated to the United States with his family when he was one year old. His father opened a furniture store in the Orlando area in central Florida, where Nanton largely grew up. His first job was as a tennis instructor when he was 12 years old. He attended Lake Mary High School in Lake Mary, Florida, where he played on the school's varsity tennis team and served as student body president. He graduated from high school in 1998. In his late teens, Nanton became interested in songwriting and music production. By the time he was a college student at the University of Florida, he had a recording studio in Gainesville where he was able to work with acts such as Stan Lynch and Sister Hazel. He also made music of his own. Nanton was a member of the Sigma Phi Epsilon fraternity while at college. He graduated from the University of Florida in 2001 with a Bachelor of Science in Business Administration (BSBA) in finance. He went on to earn his J.D. from the University of Florida's Fredric G. Levin College of Law in December 2004.

== Career ==
Nanton began his career as an entertainment lawyer. He is a member of The Florida Bar. Early in his career, Nanton was CEO of the Cinemark Music Group before he cofounded his law firm Dicks & Nanton with his business partner J. W. Dicks. The firm primarily focused on liability, trademark, and entertainment law.

In July 2007, Nanton was elected to serve on the executive council of The Florida Bar Entertainment, Arts and Sports Law Committee. That year, he was also voted "Best of the Bar 2007" by his peers as published by the Orlando Business Journal, and he became a member of the National Academy of Recording Arts and Sciences with a vote in the Grammy Awards. In the same year, Nanton began to focus on celebrity marketing, consulting, and public relations. With J.W. Dicks, he formed the Dicks and Nanton Celebrity Branding Agency in Winter Park, Florida in July 2007. Nanton also began serving as the agency's CEO at that time. In 2008, he co-wrote (with Dicks) his first book, Celebrity Branding You. The following year, he began contributing content to compilation books starting with Big Ideas for Your Business.

In 2010, the Dicks Nanton Agency branched into documentary film production. Nanton produced and co-directed the documentary short, Jacob's Turn. Nanton was honored with an Emmy award in the Director (Post-Production) category at the 47th Ohio Valley Emmy Awards that year. In the following years, Nanton continued producing and directing films. Films were produced as part of the CelebrityFilms production company started by Dicks and Nanton. That company would later start a new division known as DNA Films.

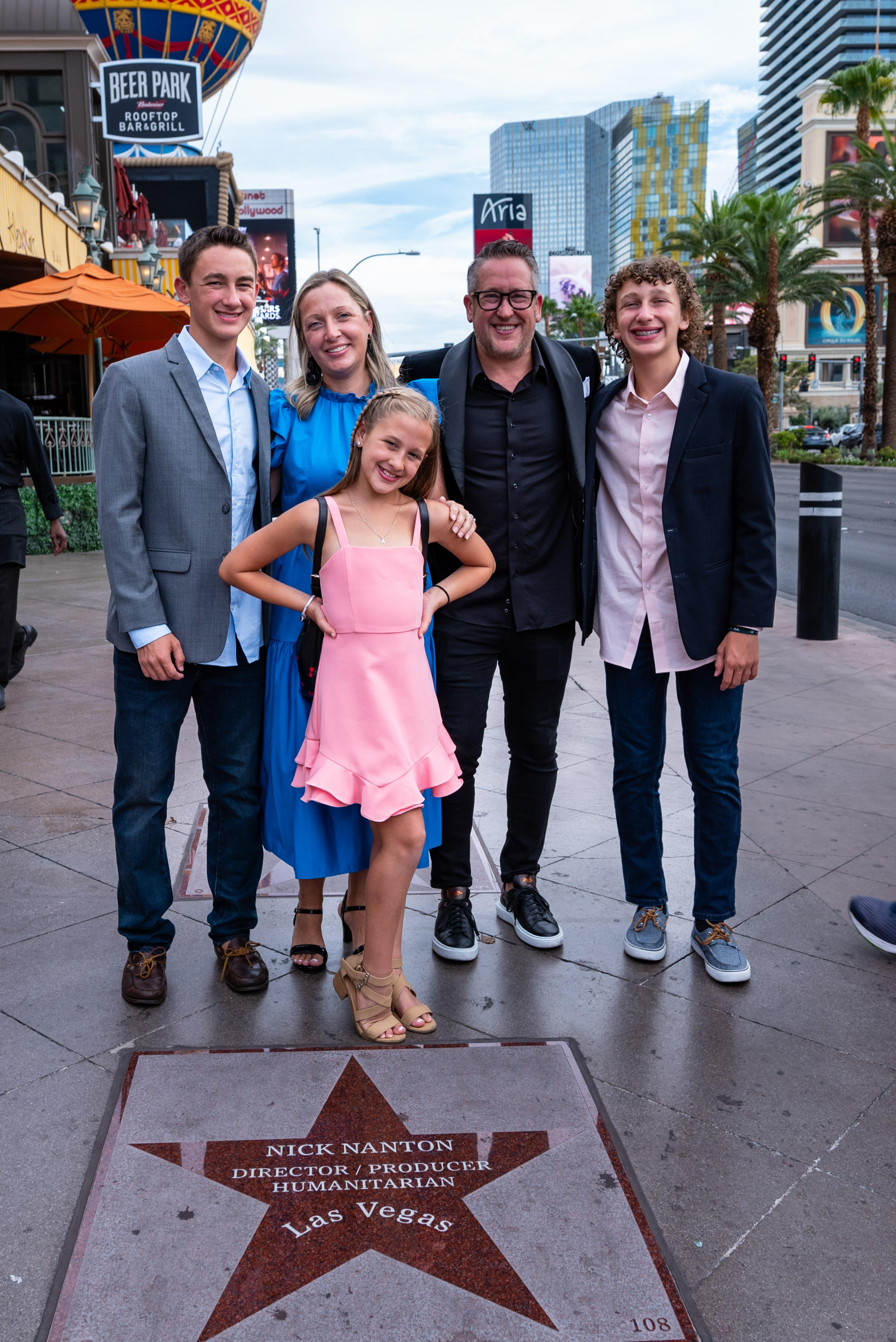
Nick Nanton and family in 2022 receiving a star on the Las Vegas Walk of Stars.

Nanton continued authoring and contributing to books. In 2013, he published Story Selling which appeared on The Wall Street Journal Best Seller list. With J.W. Dicks, he founded a publishing company called CelebrityPress, which primarily publishes books on the topics of business and entrepreneurship. He directed and was executive producer of the documentary Mi Casa Hogar about the Casa Hogar children's home in Acapulco, Mexico. Nanton won multiple Suncoast Regional Emmy Awards in 2013 for producing and directing the documentary shorts, Esperanza and Mi Casa Hogar. In 2014, it was announced that Nanton would direct a biographical documentary about the founder of the X Prize Foundation, Peter Diamandis. The resultant film, Visioneer, garnered Nanton another Suncoast Regional Emmy Award in the Director (Post-Production) category in 2015.

In the following years, Nanton produced and directed a number of other biographical documentaries, including Maximum Achievement: The Brian Tracy Story (2017), The Soul of Success: The Jack Canfield Story (2017), Rudy Ruettiger: The Walk On (2018), and Game Changer: The Dan Sullivan Story (2018), among others. In 2018, he won six Suncoast Regional Emmy Awards for producing and directing Rudy Ruettiger, Game Changer, and A New Leash on Life: The K9s for Warriors Story. The Ruettiger film was adapted into a one-man show called Dream Big: Rudy Ruettiger Live on Broadway which Nanton produced and directed. The sold out one-night performance marked his Broadway directorial debut and was staged at the Samuel J. Friedman Theatre in February 2019.

Also in 2018, Nanton's Prime Video interview series, In Case You Didn't Know with Nick Nanton, premiered and has since featured guests such as Larry King, Dean Kamen, and Anthony Scaramucci. That year, Nanton also directed the documentary, Operation Toussaint, which chronicled the efforts of Operation Underground Railroad (O.U.R.) to retrieve child trafficking victims in Haiti. This film garnered a national News and Documentary nomination. A 2019 follow-up to that film, Triple Take, followed the eponymous Operation Triple Take undertaken by O.U.R. in Colombia. Triple Take was the basis for the feature film Sound of Freedom. He also won for From Shelter to Service: A K9s for Warriors Story.

In 2020, two episodes ("Nido Qubein: Extraordinary is a Choice" and "Lisa Nichols: Born to Win") from his Prime Video series won Emmy Awards as individual documentaries. He also directed the documentary, Folds of Honor, that year which details the charitable efforts of the non-profit organization of the same name. Also in 2020, he directed and produced It's Happening Right Here, a documentary about survivors of sex trafficking. The following year he directed Hero, a documentary film featuring UFC hall of Fame fighter Dominick Cruz, singer and advocate Mandy Harvey, world record holder Laura Penhaul, and actor and producer Remi Adeleke.

Nanton was honored with a star on the Las Vegas Walk of Stars in 2022. He also directed the film Dickie V, covering the life and career of Dick Vitale, which premiered on ESPN+ and Disney + the same year. In 2022, he directed and produced Tactical Empathy, a documentary about FBI hostage negotiator and author of the New York Times Best-Selling Book Never Split the Difference, Chris Voss. In 2024, he began filming a documentary about artist and conservationist Guy Harvey. He also directed the Broadway show When My Soul Speaks: Lisa Nichols Live the same year.

In 2024, Nanton directed the documentary Brisa, about Brisa De Angulo Losada. The film received a Silver Telly Award in May 2025 and was shortlisted for the International Documentary Awards that same year.

In 2024, he co-founded The Difference Business Bourbon, a bourbon whiskey brand with Chris Voss and Roy Milner.

Nanton won two Suncoast Emmy Awards in 2025. He served as a judge for Miss America 2026.

== Personal life ==
He is married to Kristina Nanton and they have three children.

== Filmography ==
Year	Title	Role	Notes
2010	Jacob's Turn	Executive producer, co-director	Documentary short
2012	Tackling Taxes	Executive producer, creative director	Documentary short
2012	Practicing Perfection	Executive producer, creative director	Documentary short
2012	Car Men	Executive producer, executive creative director	Documentary short
2012	The Flower Girl	Executive producer, director	Short film
2012	Cracking the Celebrity Code	Executive producer, executive creative director	Documentary short
2012	Filling the Financial Gap	Executive producer, director	Documentary short
2013	Life & The Party	Executive producer, executive creative director	Documentary short
2013	Esperanza	Executive producer, producer, director	Documentary short
2013	Faith Family and Taxes	Executive producer, director	Documentary short
2013	Life in Balance	Executive producer, director	Documentary short
2013	Back to Health	Executive producer, director	Documentary short
2013	Coach Pete's Financial Safari	Producer, director	Documentary short
2013	Real People, Real Systems, Real Profits	Executive producer, director	Documentary short
2013	Making the Difference	Executive producer, director	Documentary short
2013	Mi Casa Hogar	Executive producer, director	Documentary short
2013	The I.T. Guy	Executive producer, executive creative director	Documentary short
2013	A Life of Success and Significance	Executive producer, director	Documentary short
2014	Stand and Serve	Executive producer, director	Documentary short
2014	Get Your Life Back	Executive producer, director	Documentary short
2014	Heritage	Executive producer, director	Documentary short
2014	If It Is to Be It's Up to Me	Executive producer, director	Documentary short
2015	Visioneer: The Peter Diamandis Story	Executive producer, director	Documentary film
2016	The Rebound	Executive producer	Documentary film
2016	Return to Esperanza	Executive producer, director	Documentary short
2016	Armonia	Executive producer, director	Documentary short
2017	Maximum Achievement: The Brian Tracy Story	Executive producer, director	Documentary film
2017	Live Your Quest	Executive producer, director	Documentary film
2017	The Soul of Success: The Jack Canfield Story	Executive producer, director	Documentary film
2018	Game Changer: The Dan Sullivan Story	Executive producer, director	Documentary film
2018	Rudy Ruettiger: The Walk On	Executive producer, director	Documentary film
2018	Operation Toussaint: Operation Underground Railroad and the Fight to End Modern Day Slavery	Executive producer, director	Documentary film
2018	Getting Everything You Can Out of All You've Got: The Jay Abraham Story	Executive producer, director	Documentary film
2018	A New Leash on Life: The K9s for Warriors Story	Executive producer, director	Documentary film
2018–present	In Case You Didn't Know with Nick Nanton	Creator, executive producer, director, host	Amazon Prime Video docuseries
2019	From Shelter to Service: A K9s for Warriors Story	Executive producer, director	Documentary film
2019	Triple Take	Executive producer, director	Documentary film
2020	Folds of Honor: A Fighter Pilot's Mission to Deliver Healing and Hope to America	Executive producer, director	Documentary film
2020	Choose Yourself: The James Altucher Story	Executive producer, director	Prime Video docuseries
2020	Dreamer	Executive producer, director	Documentary film
2022	It's Happening Right Here	Director, Executive Producer	Documentary
2022	Dickie V	Director	Documentary film
2023	Hero	Director, Executive Producer	Documentary
2024	Tactical Empathy	Director, Executive Producer	Documentary
2024	When My Soul Speaks: Lisa Nichols Live	Director	Broadway play
2024	Brisa	Director	Shortlisted for Best Feature Documentary at the 40th IDA Documentary Awards

== Bibliography ==
Year	Title	Original publisher	ISBN	Notes
2008	Celebrity Branding You	CelebrityPress	ISBN 978-0983947073	Co-written with JW Dicks; Second edition released in 2013
2013	Story Selling	CelebrityPress	ISBN 978-0988641877	Co-written with JW Dicks; The Wall Street Journal best-seller list
2015	Mission Driven Business	Impact Publishing	ISBN 978-0996197885	Co-written with JW Dicks
2018	Rudy Ruettiger: The Walk On	Morgan James Publishing	ISBN 978-1642790931	Co-written with Rudy Ruettiger
2019	Leo Learns About Life	CelebrityPress	ISBN 978-1732284364	Children's book
2024	Empathy and Understanding In Business	Successbooks	ISBN 979-8986209791	Co-written with Chris Voss

== Nominations and awards ==
Year	Award	Category	Nominee	Result	Ref.
2011	47th Ohio Valley Emmy Awards	Director – Post-Production	Nick Nanton for Jacob's Turn	Won	
2013	27th Midsouth Emmy Awards	Documentary - Topical	Car Men (Produced and directed by Nick Nanton)	Nominated	
2013	37th Suncoast Regional Emmy Awards	Documentary – Topical	Esperanza (Produced and directed by Nick Nanton)	Won	
2013	37th Suncoast Regional Emmy Awards	Documentary – Topical	Mi Casa Hogar (Produced and directed by Nick Nanton)	Nominated	
2013	37th Suncoast Regional Emmy Awards	Director – Post-Production	Nick Nanton for Mi Casa Hogar	Won	
2013	37th Suncoast Regional Emmy Awards	Director – Post-Production	Nick Nanton for Esperanza	Nominated	
2015	39th Suncoast Regional Emmy Awards	Director – Post-Production	Nick Nanton for Visioneer: The Peter Diamandis Story	Won	
2015	39th Suncoast Regional Emmy Awards	Director – Post-Production	Nick Nanton for Armonia	Nominated	
2016	40th Suncoast Regional Emmy Awards	Documentary – Topical	Return to Esperanza (Produced and directed by Nick Nanton)	Won	
2018	42nd Suncoast Regional Emmy Awards	Documentary – Topical	Rudy Ruettiger: The Walk On (Produced and directed by Nick Nanton)	Won	
2018	42nd Suncoast Regional Emmy Awards	Documentary – Topical	A New Leash on Life: The K9s for Warriors Story (Produced and directed by Nick Nanton)	Won	
2018	42nd Suncoast Regional Emmy Awards	Director – Non-Live (Post-Production)	Nick Nanton for Rudy Ruettiger: The Walk On	Won	
2018	42nd Suncoast Regional Emmy Awards	Director – Non-Live (Post-Production)	Nick Nanton for A New Leash on Life: The K9s for Warriors Story	Won	
2018	42nd Suncoast Regional Emmy Awards	Director – Non-Live (Post-Production)	Nick Nanton for Game Changer: The Dan Sullivan Story	Won	
2018	42nd Suncoast Regional Emmy Awards	Human Interest – Program Feature/Segment	Downrange (Produced and directed by Nick Nanton)	Won	
2019	43rd Suncoast Regional Emmy Awards	Documentary – Topical	Triple Take (Produced and directed by Nick Nanton)	Won	
2019	43rd Suncoast Regional Emmy Awards	Documentary – Topical	From Shelter to Service: A K9s for Warriors Story (Produced and directed by Nick Nanton)	Nominated	
2019	43rd Suncoast Regional Emmy Awards	Director – Non-Live (Post-Produced)	Nick Nanton for Triple Take	Won	
2019	43rd Suncoast Regional Emmy Awards	Director – Non-Live (Post-Produced)	Nick Nanton for From Shelter to Service: A K9s for Warriors Story	Won	
2019	43rd Suncoast Regional Emmy Awards	Director – Non-Live (Post-Produced)	Nick Nanton for Longevity	Nominated	
2019	43rd Suncoast Regional Emmy Awards	Promotion – Program – Single Spot	Triple Take (Produced and directed by Nick Nanton)	Won	
2019	43rd Suncoast Regional Emmy Awards	Promotion – Program – Single Spot	Longevity (Produced and directed by Nick Nanton)	Nominated	
2019	43rd Suncoast Regional Emmy Awards	Special Event Coverage – Edited	Dream Big: Rudy Ruettiger Live on Broadway (Produced and directed by Nick Nanton)	Nominated	
2020	44th Suncoast Regional Emmy Awards	Documentary – Cultural	Nido Qubein: Extraordinary is a Choice (Produced and directed by Nick Nanton)	Won	
2020	44th Suncoast Regional Emmy Awards	Documentary – Cultural	Lisa Nichols: Born to Win (Produced and directed by Nick Nanton)	Won	
2020	44th Suncoast Regional Emmy Awards	Documentary – Topical	Dreamer (Produced and directed by Nick Nanton)	Won	
2020	44th Suncoast Regional Emmy Awards	Director – Non-Live (Post-Produced)	Nick Nanton for Nido Qubein: Extraordinary is a Choice	Won	
2020	44th Suncoast Regional Emmy Awards	Director – Non-Live (Post-Produced)	Nick Nanton for Lisa Nichols: Born to Win	Won	
2020	44th Suncoast Regional Emmy Awards	Director – Non-Live (Post-Produced)	Nick Nanton for Dreamer	Nominated	
2020	44th Suncoast Regional Emmy Awards	Promotion – Program – Single Spot	Dreamer (Produced and directed by Nick Nanton)	Won	
2020	34th Heartland Emmy Awards	Documentary	Folds of Honor (Produced and directed by Nick Nanton)	Won	
2024	Rocky Mountain Emmy Awards	Director – Production - Cinematography	Conquer 100	Nominated	
