= Mark Mabry =

American photographer

- Education: Brooks Institute; Arizona State University
- Occupations: Photographer; writer; cinematographer; activist
- Known for: The Abolitionists; Man in the Moon (event)

Mark Mabry is an American photographer, cinematographer, and activist, best known for his photographic depictions of Jesus, his work with political commentator Glenn Beck and his anti-slavery activism.

In 2008 and 2009 Mark published two Reflections of Christ photo books recreating scenes from the life of Jesus. During that time he was also featured in two short documentaries by producer Cameron Trejo, based on those photo shoots. The photos have been in an exhibit that has toured the U.S. and Canada.

Mabry was hired to work with Beck in 2012 as creative director of Mercury Radio Arts.

In 2014 Mark became involved with Operation Underground Railroad (O.U.R.), an organization rescuing children from sex traffickers. He appeared in the 2016 documentary, The Abolitionists, a film following the sting operations of O.U.R. and in 2018 was a cinematographer for "Operation Toussaint", another film about modern day slavery.

Mabry produces and co-hosts "Slave Stealers", a podcast about human trafficking which has featured guests like former Mexican president Vicente Fox, Montel Williams, Marisol Nichols, and Beck. He also hosts and produces the "Gifted and Lifted Podcast", a show featuring "high achievers" who credit their belief in God with their success.

== See also ==
- List of Arizona State University alumni
