= A Breeze of Hope =

Bolivian nonprofit organization

A Breeze of Hope (Spanish: Una Brisa de Esperanza) is a Bolivian non-profit organization that provides free legal, social, and psychological support to girls, boys, and adolescents who are survivors of sexual violence. The organization was founded and is led by Brisa de Ángulo, herself a survivor of sexual abuse as a teenager. It emerged from the creation of the Centro Una Brisa de Esperanza (FUBE), established in 2004 by Brisa and her parents, and recognized as the first center in Bolivia dedicated to supporting child and adolescent survivors of sexual violence. Since 2014, it has collaborated with the international women’s rights organization Equality Now.

The center focuses on addressing both the psychological and physical consequences of violence. It provides professional psychological counseling, comprehensive legal assistance, and social services to survivors and their families. It also engages in prevention efforts, community education, and advocacy for public policy reforms to address sexual violence.

== History ==
Brisa de Ángulo, an advocate and survivor of sexual abuse, founded A Breeze of Hope in 2004 to address the urgent need for support and justice for sexually abused children in Bolivia. She experienced repeated rape by a family member at 16, and her decision to report the abuse was met with intimidation and blame from her community, extended family, and the authorities.

In November 2007, the Bolivian government declared August 9 as the National Day Against Child Sexual Abuse through Law No. 3773. This law recognizes the right of victims to be heard, to access justice, and to live free from violence. Each year, a march against child sexual abuse is organized in the different departments of Bolivia. The first march was initiated by Brisa at age 17 in Cochabamba, attended by 5,000 people. Brisa recalls: "My dream was to show survivors that they are not alone, that there are more good people than bad. With that motivation, I started giving talks at universities and on TV to encourage others to join the march. No one thought it would succeed."

In 2012, CUBE, together with Rutgers Law School in Camden and the Washington College of Law, presented a thematic hearing before the Inter-American Commission on Human Rights at the Organization of American States. The hearing described Bolivia’s systemic failures in cases of sexual violence involving adolescent girls, as well as feasible reforms the country could implement to address the problem.

In 2013, A Breeze of Hope advocacy before the Inter-American Commission on Human Rights successfully led to the repeal of Bolivia’s “marriage-rape law,” which had allowed perpetrators to avoid prosecution by marrying their victims.

Since 2014, the foundation has collaborated with the international women’s rights advocacy organization Equality Now.

In 2016, young people who had benefited from ABH’s services created the Youth Network Against Sexual Violence, which provides one-on-one contact in schools, community events, fairs, and interviews with local media.

In 2016, the Youth Network Against Sexual Violence was created, led by survivors.

In 2019, the international report What Works to Prevent Sexual Violence Against Children highlighted the foundation’s model as innovative and based on global best practices. According to the study, the foundation provides free legal, psychological, and social services, and has maintained a 96% conviction rate in the cases it supports. The report also notes the training of over 100,000 people in the prevention and management of sexual violence cases.
