= The Abolitionists =

2016 documentary film

- Promotional poster
- Directed by: Darrin Fletcher; Chet Thomas
- Produced by: McKay Daines; Darrin Fletcher; Chet Thomas
- Starring: Tim Ballard; Laurie Holden; Mark Mabry; Krista Rykert
- Cinematography: Tristan Whitman
- Edited by: Mike Chenoweth
- Music by: Tim Jones
- Production company: FletChet Entertainment
- Distributed by: Fathom
- Release date: May 16, 2016
- Running time: 87 min
- Country: United States
- Language: English

The Abolitionists is a 2016 American documentary film directed by Darrin Fletcher and Chet Thomas about a sting mission orchestrated in Colombia by the organization Operation Underground Railroad jump team, led by former U.S. Homeland Security Special Agent Tim Ballard, countering child sex trafficking.

== Production ==
The film was developed first and foremost as a reality television series, but as the first episode was being edited it began to take on its own life as a feature film, with seven episodes of the television series about subsequent jumps produced shortly after.

== Reception ==
=== Critical response ===
The site NYC Movie Guru's critic wrote: "Spellbinding, gripping and eye-opening. Bravo to directors Darrin Fletcher and Chet Thomas for bringing Tim Ballard and the human rights issue of child sex trafficking to light". The Abolitionists had a one-night premiere on May 16, 2016, at over 450 theaters.

== Episodes ==
No.	Title	Directed by	Original release date
1	"Operation Yvrose"	Darrin Fletcher & Chet Thomas	TBA
2	"Operation Boca Chica"	Darrin Fletcher & Chet Thomas	TBA
3	"Operation Open Doors"	Darrin Fletcher & Chet Thomas	TBA
4	"Operation New World"	Darrin Fletcher & Chet Thomas	TBA
5	"Operation Triple Take - Part I"	Darrin Fletcher & Chet Thomas	TBA
6	"Operation Triple Take - Part II"	Darrin Fletcher & Chet Thomas	TBA
7	"Operation Searching For Gardy"	Darrin Fletcher & Chet Thomas	TBA
