= Pete Vallee =

- Also known as: Pete "Big Elvis" Vallee
- Born: 1965; Memphis, Tennessee
- Genres: Rock; Gospel
- Occupations: Singer, elvis impersonator
- Instrument: Guitar
- Years active: 1996–present

Pete Vallee, known professionally as Pete "Big Elvis" Vallee, is an Elvis impersonator. At one stage and possibly even now, he is the world's heaviest Elvis impersonator.

== Background ==
Vallee was born in Memphis, Tennessee to a mother who was a singer. She ended her singing career to concentrate on motherhood. The youngest of four children, Vallee grew up in a house that had pictures of his mother Delores Vallee with Kitty Wells, Elvis Presley and others. In 1971 when he was five, his mother divorced his alcoholic father.

On July 15, 2010, he married Amanda Lasham, the daughter of Robert & Letitia Lasham. She is of Hawaiian and Philippine extraction and was raised in Hawaii.

== Elvis career ==
At the age of 13, Vallee learned to play guitar. Even at that age, he was quite sizable. One day when he was singing in a choir, his pastor heard him and commented that he sounded like Elvis. He later was in Washington as part of a group called Ricky and the Starfires.

Vallee started his Elvis act around 1996 and came to Las Vegas in 1997. He has been described as one of the longest-running, and most unusual, Elvis impersonators in Las Vegas. He performs at The Piano Bar at Harrah's Casino doing Elvis' 40-minute sets three times on afternoons.

On Feb. 27, 2017, Vallee was honored with a star on the Las Vegas Walk of Stars.

== Venues ==
Vallee had a residency at Harrah's Casino on the Las Vegas Strip. During his performances, he handed out maracas and Elvis wigs to audience members and invited them to get involved.

== Health ==
=== Weight loss ===
In 2005, he weighed 960 pounds (68st 8 lb, 435 kg). Five years later, he had dropped down to 450 pounds (32st 2 lb, 204 kg). At one stage he had to weigh himself on the scales in a post office which he had to access from the back entrance so he wouldn't be seen. He achieved his weight loss with diet and exercise, and with help from his manager Lucille Star.

=== Accident ===
In September 2015, Vallee was hospitalized after being involved in a road accident on Blue Diamond road that resulted in leg lacerations and bruises.

== Ancestry ==
In a 2004 Las Vegas Mercury article, Vallee has said that there are three other Elvis love children other than himself. One is a woman called Desiree Presley who Vallee said Presley, when he was alive, acknowledged as his daughter. He said the other two were male. Vallee's publicist, Lucille Star said she believed Vallee was Presley's son. They were hoping to get a sample of Lisa Marie Presley's DNA He has had two birth certificates. One from Memphis, the other from Canada. Vallee said that when his mother Delores was dying, she told him that she had an affair with Presley who was introduced to her by Kitty Wells. Apparently, his mother had an affair with Presley in 1964.

== Films ==
=== The Big Elvis Files ===
An article in the Las Vegas Review-Journal, dated August 28, 2014 mentioned that Vallee was to appear in a film The Big Elvis Files. In addition to some fellow Las Vegas performers, Cook E. Jarr was to appear in the film. Most of the writing and co-production was handled by his brother Guy Vallee who also had a small part in the film. The film was about two policeman from the city who were on the run. They sought refuge in La Conner, a small town in Skagit County where they come across "Big Elvis". Among the people to appear in the film which included locals from Skagit, the actual sheriff and mayor of La Conner appeared in the film.

=== Big Elvis ===
In 2018, Paul Stone created a short film titled Big Elvis, a biography of Vallee's life and career, as well as his claim to be Elvis's biological son. It was met with positive reviews. It was also nominated for Best Documentary Short at the Tribeca Film Festival.
