= The Pathfinder (1996 film) =

1996 American television film

- Based on: The Pathfinder, or The Inland Sea by James Fenimore Cooper
- Written by: Tommy Lynch; Bruce Reisman
- Directed by: Donald Shebib
- Starring: Kevin Dillon; Laurie Holden; Graham Greene; Stacy Keach; Russell Means; Jaimz Woolvett
- Theme music composer: Reg Powell
- Country of origin: United States
- Original language: English

Production
- Cinematography: Curtis Petersen
- Running time: 94 minutes

Original release
- Release: 1996

The Pathfinder is a 1996 American television film based on the 1840 novel The Pathfinder, or The Inland Sea by James Fenimore Cooper. It stars Kevin Dillon as Pathfinder and Laurie Holden as Mabel Dunham.

The film is known as La Légende de Pathfinder in Canada (French title) and Le Lac Ontario in France.

== Cast ==
- Kevin Dillon as Pathfinder/Hawkeye
- Laurie Holden as Mabel Dunham
- Graham Greene as Chingachgook
- Stacy Keach as Compte du Leon
- Russell Means as Arrowhead
- Charles Edwin Powell as Lt. Zale
- Charlotte Sullivan as May
- Jaimz Woolvett as Jasper Weston
- Christian Laurin as Capt. Sanglier
- Ralph Kussman as Guard on Ship
