= John Couch (American executive) =

American business executive and author

John Couch is an American business executive and author who served as Apple Computer's First Vice President of Education.

After becoming one of the first fifty computer science graduates from UC Berkeley, Couch joined Hewlett-Packard as software engineer and, in 1978, was recruited by Steve Jobs as Director of New Products for Apple Computer, Inc., making him the company's 54th employee. Soon thereafter he became Apple's first Vice President of Software and then General Manager overseeing the Apple Lisa computer division.

In 1984, Couch left Apple to take over a struggling Christian school in Solana Beach, California. He also served as Executive in Residence for the Mayfield Fund and, in 1997, became CEO of biotechnology software maker DoubleTwist (then called Pangea Systems). After leaving DoubleTwist, he was again recruited by Steve Jobs to return to Apple and take on the newly created role of Vice President of Education.

In May 2018, Couch and his co-author, Jason Towne, published the book Rewiring Education which became the best-selling education book in China. That same year, Couch founded Eden Inspirations, a ministry that works with Christian music artists and labels, such as Aaron Gillespie and Bethel Music. By 2019, the company had released three CDs: Songs of the Night, Songs of Freedom, and Songs of Wisdom.

In June 2018, Couch was announced as an executive producer of the action film Sound of Freedom, starring Jim Caviezel. Later that same year, Couch launched a wine tasting company called Eden Estate Wines. Couch's memoir, My Life at Apple and the Steve I Knew, was published in July 2021. Sound of Freedom was released theatrically in 2023.

As of 2022, Couch is a resident of San Luis Obispo, California. California Polytechnic State University, San Luis Obispo, awarded him an honorary Doctor of Science degree in 2025.
