= Dick Jensen =

- Also known as: Dick Jensen; Lance Curtis
- Born: Richard Hiram Jensen; April 19, 1942; Kalihi, Hawaii
- Died: June 21, 2006 (aged 64) Honolulu, Hawaii
- Occupation: Live performer
- Years active: 1960–2001
- Labels: Philadelphia International; Bluewater; Probe; Epic

Richard Hiram Jensen (April 9, 1942 – June 21, 2006), was a musical performer of the Rhythm and Blues, Soul, and Gospel genres. His signature on-stage style incorporated strenuous dance moves similar to those of Jackie Wilson. He was born in Kalihi, Hawaii on the island of Oahu.

== Biography ==
Jensen was a native Hawaiian athletic song stylist whose "white hot soul" electrified audiences. He was of Hawaiian, French, Danish, English and Irish descent.

A graduate of Farrington High School, he first used the stage name Lance Curtis. He was a main showroom caliber draw who filled rooms at the Outrigger Waikiki, the Oceania Floating Restaurant, Hilton Hawaiian Dome, Reef Towers Polynesian Palace and the Hula Hut.

By 1968, this one-time opening act for the Rolling Stones had become an international performer, signing with Don Costa Productions and began performing at the El Quid in Mexico City. He often divided his career between the islands and Las Vegas, Nevada. Jensen earned the sobriquet "The Giant" because of his tall stature, but he had a talent to match that nickname. His vocal stylings came deep from his Hawaiian soul, as he danced around the stage. Some have compared seeing his physicality on stage to watching the seemingly effortless glide of a professional ice skater. In 1970, he was appearing at the Century Plaza in New York City, in his debut of that city. In 1970, 1971, 1972 and 1973, he appeared at the Copacabana in New York, aptly being compared to James Brown, the superstar most analogous to Jensen's onstage style.

He branched out into acting with guest starring roles on popular television shows. In 1982, he appeared on The Mike Douglas Show when it was broadcast from Hawaii.

In his later years, Jensen became a born again evangelical Christian minister.

He died of Lou Gehrig's Disease, complicated by heart surgery and a series of mini-strokes, which took his legs before it took his life on June 21, 2006. Jensen was survived by his wife Toni, daughters Summer Jensen, Renee Jensen-Oliveira of Honolulu and Nikeila Jensen of Los Angeles, daughter Jennifer Garcia of Las Vegas, and son Brandon Jensen of Honolulu. He also had three grandchildren.

== Discography ==
- White Hot Soul (1969) LP album 519361 (Probe)
- Real Good Woman / Bird You Must Fly (1970) promo single CP479 (Probe)
- Dick Jensen (1973) LP album KZ31794 (Philadelphia International)
- Dick Jensen (1973) LP album EPC65591 (Epic)
- Going Up The Mountain (1973) single EPC 1395 (Epic)
- Peace of Mind / New York City's A Lonely Town (1973) single ZS73542 (Epic)
- Giant Of Hawaii (1975) LP album (Record Club Of Honolulu)

== Television work ==
- The Islander (1978)
- Hawaii Five-O
- Magnum, P.I. (1986)
- Island Son (1989)
- Jake and the Fatman (1989)

== Awards ==
On November 5, 2005, Jensen received a star on the Las Vegas Walk of Stars, commemorating his distinguished contributions to that city's entertainment.

The Hawai'i Academy of Recording Arts awarded Jensen the 2006 Na Hoku Hanohano Lifetime Achievement Award.
