= Las Vegas Walk of Stars =

Entertainment honors in Las Vegas, Nevada

Coordinates: 36.125413°N 115.169677°W

- Established: 2004
- Location: Las Vegas Strip, Paradise/Winchester, Nevada
- Type: Entertainment walk of fame
- Website: Official website

The Las Vegas Walk of Stars is a walk of fame along the Las Vegas Strip, located in the unincorporated towns of Paradise and Winchester, Nevada. It was established to honor prominent Las Vegas figures, including entertainers. Wayne Newton was the first to receive a star on the Walk of Stars, in a ceremony taking place on October 26, 2004.

Other stars have since been added for entertainers such as Elvis Presley, Frank Sinatra, Sammy Davis Jr., David Cassidy, Liberace, Rich Little, and Siegfried & Roy. As of 2022, the Walk of Stars had issued over 100 stars, although more than half of these had been removed several years earlier, when the county installed security bollards along the Strip.

== History ==
In October 2003, the city of Las Vegas entered an agreement with Clear Channel Entertainment, in which the latter would produce events to celebrate the city's centennial anniversary in 2005. Among the proposals was to create an attraction in downtown Las Vegas inspired by the Hollywood Walk of Fame, although this ultimately went unbuilt. During 2004, a different walk of fame project along the Las Vegas Strip was negotiated between Clark County and the Motion Picture Hall of Fame Foundation. The latter oversaw the Palm Springs Walk of Stars and would also do so for the proposed Las Vegas Walk of Stars.

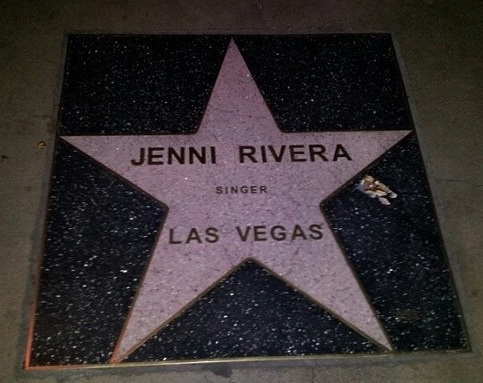
Singer Jenni Rivera's star, 2014

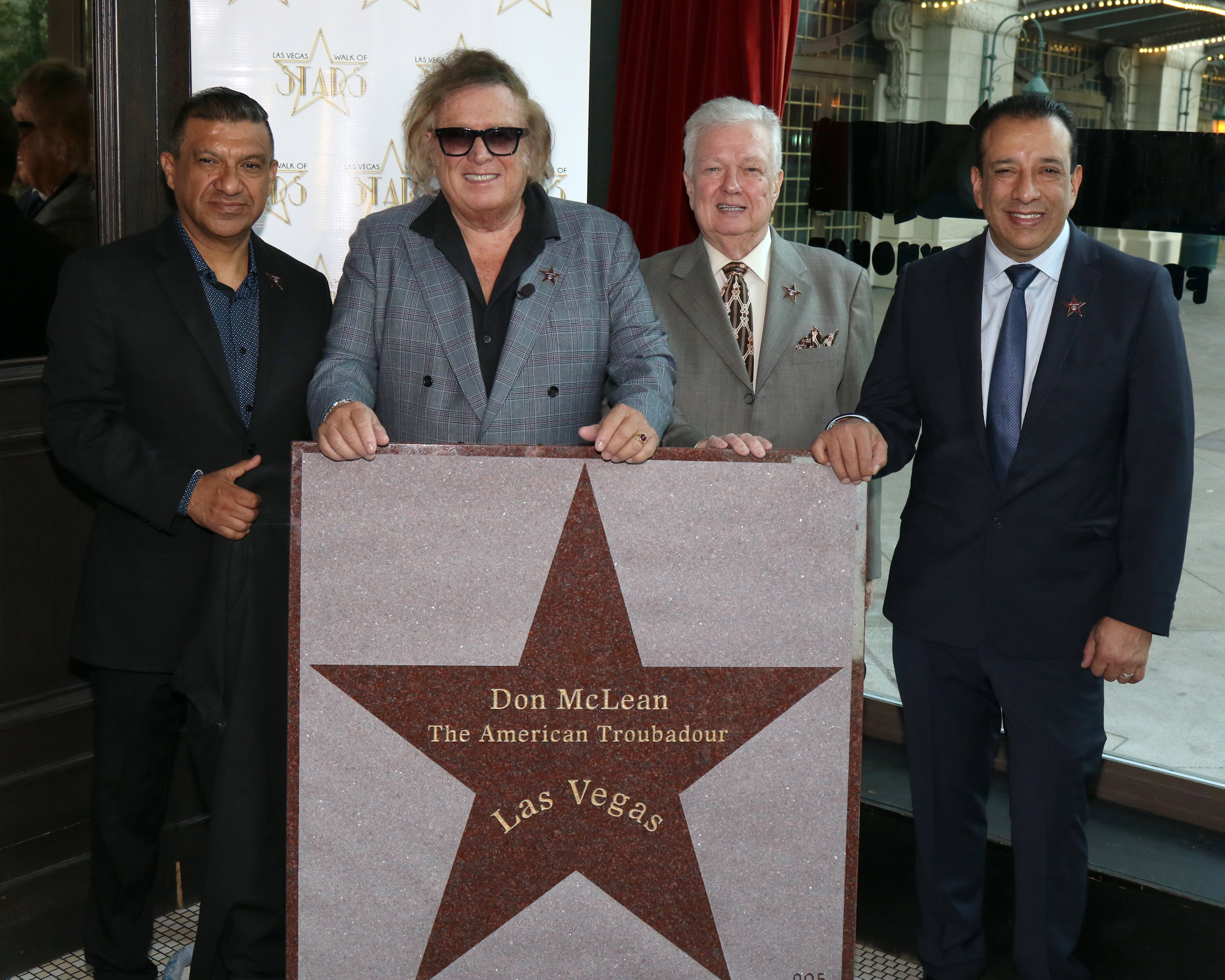
Singer Don McLean's star, 2019

The project was approved by the Clark County Commission in August 2004. It would honor important figures associated with Las Vegas history, including prominent entertainers. The project would add stars along both sides of the Strip sidewalk, from the Sahara resort at the north end of the Strip to Mandalay Bay at the south end. At the time, each star and its accompanying ceremony cost a total of $15,000, a fee covered by sponsors such as friends, family, and fan clubs. The stars are made of polished granite and weigh 180 pounds. Exact site selection along the Strip is chosen by the sponsors for each star. A committee met monthly to propose potential new stars for the project. The star fee had increased to $25,000 as of 2022.

Singer Wayne Newton was the first person to receive a star on the Walk of Stars, in a ceremony taking place on October 26, 2004. Entertainer Liberace and female impersonator Frank Marino were the next to receive stars, both in February 2005. In 2010, Marino became the first person to have earned induction into the Walk of Stars twice, while Cuban-American musicians Gloria Estefan and Emilio Estefan were the first couple recognized, who shared a star. In 2011, Mexican power couple Jenni Rivera and Esteban Loaiza were the second to be recognized by the attraction.

A county project began in November 2017 to install security bollards along the Strip sidewalk, removing 49 of 82 stars in the process, including those of Newton, Liberace, and Marino. The cost to put the stars back in place would have been $250,000. Efforts were underway to seek out a permanent location for the Walk of Stars project, and financing was later sought to return the missing stars.

Bob Alexander, president of the Las Vegas Walk of Stars since its inception, died from pneumonia in September 2020, at the age of 77. His role was taken over by vice president Marilyn Ball, mother of actress Lindsay Wagner. As of 2022, the Walk of Stars had issued more than 100 stars.

== Honorees ==
Name	Nationality	Specialty	Date	Ref.
Wayne Newton	United States	Singer	October 26, 2004	
Frank Marino	United States	Female impersonator	February 1, 2005	
Liberace	United States	Singer	February 1, 2005	
Rich Little	Canada	Voice actor	February 15, 2005	
Line Renaud	France	Singer	October 24, 2005	
Dick Jensen	United States	Live performer	November 5, 2005	
Mel Larson	United States	Former NASCAR racer	January 9, 2006	
Toni Hart	United States	Entertainer and humanitarian	April 26, 2006	
John Stuart	United States	Founder of Legends in Concert	May 30, 2006	
Wayne Allyn Root	United States	TV celebrity	August 15, 2006	
Siegfried & Roy	Germany	Magicians	October 3, 2006	
Society of Seven	United States	Variety Troupe	November 28, 2006	
Sammy Davis, Jr.	United States	Singer	February 15, 2007	
Bobby Darin	United States	Singer	May 14, 2007	
Tony Sacca	United States	Television Personality	February 17, 2008	
Trini Lopez	United States	Singer	May 15, 2008	
Elvis Presley	United States	Singer	September 26, 2008	
Raúl De Molina	Cuba; United States	Television personality	November 3, 2009	
Lili Estefan	Cuba; United States	Television personality	November 3, 2009	
Dean Martin	United States	Singer	February 22, 2010	
Frank Sinatra	United States	Singer	February 22, 2010	
Frank Marino	United States	Female Impersonator	February 25, 2010	
Emilio & Gloria Estefan	Cuba; United States	Singer and Producer	April 29, 2010	
Fernando Vargas	United States	Boxer	January 28, 2011	
Jenni Rivera	Mexico; United States	Singer	July 1, 2011	
Esteban Loaiza	Mexico	Baseball pitcher	July 1, 2011	
Engelbert Humperdinck	England	Singer	July 20, 2011	
Frankie Valli and The Four Seasons	United States	Music band	March 21, 2013	
Cadetes de Linares	Mexico	Music Band	January 24,2013	
Regulo Caro	Mexico	Singer	October 22, 2014	
Pete Vallee	United States	Singer	February 27, 2017	
Yuya (Mariand Castrejón Castañeda)	Mexico	YouTuber	September 15, 2018	
Frank Shankwitz	United States	Founder Make A Wish Foundation	June 15, 2019	
Greg S. Reid	United States	Motivational Speaker, Author	June 15, 2019	
Don McLean	United States	Singer	June 15, 2019	
Donny and Marie Osmond	United States	Brother and sister singing duo	October 4, 2019	
David Cassidy	United States	Musician	April 12, 2022	
Cook E. Jarr	United States	Longtime local singer	April 12, 2022	
Nick Nanton	United States	Director and producer	July 30, 2022	
