= Sound of Freedom =

2023 American film by Alejandro Monteverde

- Theatrical release poster
- Directed by: Alejandro Monteverde
- Written by: Rod Barr; Alejandro Monteverde
- Produced by: Eduardo Verástegui
- Starring: Jim Caviezel; Mira Sorvino; Bill Camp
- Cinematography: Gorka Gómez Andreu
- Edited by: Brian Scofield
- Music by: Javier Navarrete
- Production company: Santa Fe Films
- Distributed by: Angel Studios
- Release date: July 4, 2023
- Running time: 131 minutes
- Country: United States
- Languages: English; Spanish
- Budget: $14.5 million
- Box office: $251 million

Sound of Freedom is a 2023 American biographical drama thriller film directed and co-written by Alejandro Monteverde, and starring Jim Caviezel, Mira Sorvino, and Bill Camp. Caviezel plays Tim Ballard, a former U.S. government agent who embarks on a mission to rescue children from sex traffickers in Colombia. It is produced by Eduardo Verástegui, who also plays a role in the film.

The film was released on July 4, 2023, by Angel Studios, grossing $251 million against a $14.5 million budget to become one of the most successful independent films in history. It received mixed reviews from critics, while audience reception was highly positive.

The film attracted considerable attention for its connections to the QAnon conspiracy theory, a conspiracy theory that states a worldwide Satanic, cannibal cabal is running a mass human trafficking operation.

== Plot ==
In 2013, Roberto Aguilar, a poor father of two from Tegucigalpa, Honduras, is approached by a woman called Giselle. She offers to sign his young children, Rocío and Miguel Aguilar, to child modeling contracts. He accepts and takes them to the photoshoot. When he returns to pick up his children, they are gone. It is revealed that the children have been abducted and sold to be used as sex slaves.

In Calexico, California, Tim Ballard is a Special Agent for Homeland Security Investigations (HSI), where he arrests people who possess and distribute child pornography. The painful work takes a great toll on his personal life, and this is only worsened when another agent, Chris, points out that despite arresting and prosecuting numerous child predators, they are largely unable to prevent more children from being exploited. Ballard knows this is because most of them are outside the U.S., but Chris' words stick with him. He speaks to a suspect he arrested, Ernst Oshinsky, deceiving the man into believing he is a secret pedophile himself and using quotes from Oshinsky's novel. Once he gains Oshinsky's trust, he sets up a meeting with a trafficked child, prompting Ballard to arrest Oshinsky on child trafficking charges, and is able to arrest Earl Backman, the man who purchased Miguel.

Ballard rescues Miguel and asks him for information that would help him find other missing children. Ballard learns that Miguel's sister Rocío is still missing, and the boy asks him to save her. Ballard arranges for Miguel to return home to Roberto, but not before Miguel gives Ballard his sister's Saint Timothy necklace. Ballard starts looking for Rocío, and his search leads him to Cartagena, Colombia. He meets with Vampiro ("Vampire"), a former Cali Cartel accountant who now works to save children from sex trafficking, and Jorge, a Colombian police officer. They gain information on Giselle, whose real name is Katy Juarez, a former beauty queen.

After reading about a child sex club in Thailand which was shut down, Ballard decides that this is the perfect cover story to acquire a large number of Katy's children in a sting operation. He also gets a wealthy citizen named Pablo Delgado to help fund the mission. Ballard's supervisor, Frost, orders Ballard to return to the U.S. as he does not have the authority to conduct such an operation on foreign soil. Ballard resigns from his position rather than abandon the search for Rocío.

Sympathizing with Ballard's decision, Frost secretly persuades the staff of the U.S. Embassy in Colombia to assist him however they can. With Jorge acting as a middleman, Ballard, Vampiro, and Delgado pose as sex traffickers and convince Katy to sell them 54 children, enabling the police to identify and arrest her team while dismantling her operation. Rocío is not among the freed youths. Beforehand, Ballard set up the traffickers' lawyer, Carne, to look like a snitch, while they pretend to get detained too.

After interrogating one of Katy's associates, Fuego, and revealing a photo of a dead Carne, unaware of the circumstances of Carne's death, Fuego breaks and tells Jorge that Rocío was sold to FARC, entrenched deep in the Amazon natural region. Jorge informs Ballard that there is no way to retrieve the girl, because the region is a largely unmapped jungle wilderness, and any rebel territory is a no-fly zone for the Colombian government. Vampiro notes that medical personnel are allowed to enter on humanitarian grounds, and Jorge reluctantly agrees to help them obtain documentation to pose as doctors for the United Nations (UN). During the journey south, the rebels refuse to let Vampiro enter, and Ballard is forced to continue by himself.

Tim gains access to the FARC camp where Rocío is being held and learns that she is the personal sex slave for a FARC leader, El Alacrán ("The Scorpion"), and, along with others, is required to mash coca leaves to produce cocaine. At night, Ballard is forced to kill El Alacrán while freeing Rocío, and despite the rebels pursuing and firing on them, he gets her to safety. Before they part, he gives her back the necklace Miguel gave him earlier. Rocío is finally returned to her father and brother, and the family returns back to Honduras.

An epilogue says that Tim Ballard testified before the United States Congress and states that his testimony resulted in laws being passed that require the government to cooperate with foreign countries on sex trafficking investigations. The epilogue also claims that there are more people enslaved today than at any other time in history, including when slavery was legal.

== Cast ==
- Jim Caviezel as Tim Ballard, a DHS agent who has changed his primary focus to rescuing children from their abductors
- Mira Sorvino as Katherine Ballard, Tim's wife
- Bill Camp as Vampiro ("Vampire"), a former Cartel accountant, now a businessman secretly operating on saving abducted children
- Eduardo Verástegui as Pablo Delgado, a wealthy man who helped and funded Ballard's op
- Javier Godino as Jorge, a police officer in Cartagena aiding Ballard in his op
- José Zúñiga as Roberto Aguilar, a Honduran man whose kids, Rocío and Miguel, were kidnapped under a false pretense
- Kurt Fuller as Frost, Ballard's DHS supervisor
- Gary Basaraba as Earl Backman, an American child trafficker who bought Miguel
- Gerardo Taracena as El Alacrán ("The Scorpion"), an FARC rebel leader and drug lord who bought Rocío
- Scott Haze as Chris, a fellow DHS agent
- Gustavo Sánchez Parra as El Calacas, Giselle's contact in Cartagena
- Yessica Borroto as Katy "Giselle" Juarez, a former beauty queen running a child trafficking operation
- Kris Avedisian as Ernst Oshinsky, a registered sex offender and book author with connections to child traffickers
- Cristal Aparicio as Rocío Aguilar, Roberto's daughter and oldest child who was abducted
- Lucás Ávila as Miguel Aguilar, Roberto's son and youngest child who was abducted
- Manny Perez as Don Fuego, a ruthless trafficker working for Giselle
- Mauricio Cujar as Osorio "Carne" Rodriguez, a sadistic lawyer for the sex traffickers and child predator

== Production ==
=== Development ===
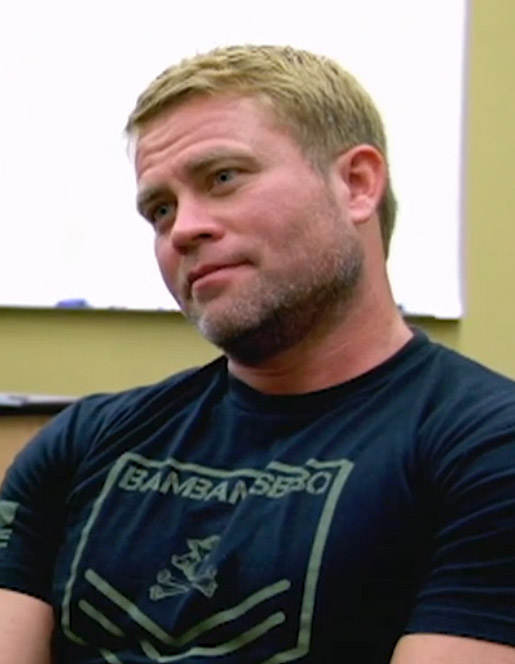
Tim Ballard's career inspired the movie.

Sound of Freedom was inspired by the work of Tim Ballard, the founder of Operation Underground Railroad (O.U.R.), a non-profit started to stop trafficking. Work on the script began in 2015. He personally requested that Jim Caviezel portray him because he had been impressed with Caviezel's performance as Edmond Dantes in The Count of Monte Cristo (2002). Caviezel said that he considers Sound of Freedom the second most important film he has ever appeared in, ranking it behind his starring role as Jesus Christ in The Passion of the Christ (2004).

The film was executive produced by Mel Gibson, Tony Robbins, who also partly financed the film's distribution; John Couch; John Paul DeJoria; Paul Hutchinson; Patrick Slim, and Andrew McCubbins, who was convicted in 2020 of running an $89 million Medicare fraud scheme.

The film's score is composed by Javier Navarrete. The film features the song "La Maza," composed by Cuban musician Silvio Rodriguez, and performed by Argentine singer Mercedes Sosa.

=== Filming ===
Principal photography began in the summer of 2018. The majority of the film was shot in Cartagena, Colombia. Additional scenes were shot in Calexico, California.

=== Distribution ===
The film was completed in 2018 and a distribution deal was made with the Latin American subsidiary of 20th Century Fox. When the studio was purchased by the Walt Disney Company, it shelved the film. Subsequently, the filmmakers bought the distribution rights back from the studio.

Verástegui approached Angel Studios with the release rights. Angel presented the film to an online group of 100,000 investors in its past projects called the Angel Guild, which gave it a "yes" vote within days. In 2023, Angel Studios had acquired the worldwide distribution rights, with a planned release during the second half of 2023. In May of the same year, it received a release date of July 4, 2023.

Angel used equity crowdfunding to raise the funds needed to distribute and market the film. Seven thousand people invested, allowing Angel to meet its $5 million goal in two weeks. They also encouraged patrons to "pay it forward" to allow people who might not otherwise see the film to watch it in theaters for free. Sound of Freedom is Angel Studios' second theatrical release after His Only Son.

On July 26, Angel Studios confirmed that Sound of Freedom would be released in 23 international markets throughout 2023. The film was released in UAE on August 17, in South Africa, Iceland and Lithuania on August 18 and Australia and New Zealand on August 24. Other countries where the film was shown include Mexico, Guatemala, Honduras, El Salvador, Nicaragua, Belize, Panama, Colombia, Venezuela, Argentina, Uruguay, Paraguay, Bolivia, Chile, Peru, Ecuador, Costa Rica, Croatia, Bosnia and Herzegovina and Serbia on August 31. In addition, the film was released in the Philippines on September 20, as well as in the United Kingdom and Ireland on September 1 and in Spain on October 11.

During the film's theatrical run, multiple outlets and moviegoers reported theaters claiming to be sold out, though seats in the auditoriums were empty. Some attribute this to pay-it-forward sales by Angel Studios. A message at the end of the film urges viewers to buy an extra ticket "for someone who would not otherwise be able to see the film," suggesting many of the extra tickets were left unused, resulting in almost empty sold out shows and unoccupied seats. Supporters paid for $26.1 million in tickets (roughly 1.8 million seats) for people to see the film for free. Angel Studios said that $21.8 million, or about 84%, of those ticket purchases were redeemed by moviegoers.

=== Accuracy ===
The film was inspired by the work of Tim Ballard, who left the Department of Homeland Security around 2013 and founded Operation Underground Railroad (O.U.R.) to work with local police in other countries to catch child sex traffickers. The film's central plot point, that of a brother and sister lured to a photo shoot in Honduras, is not an event that Ballard has claimed actually happened. According to American Crime Journal reporters, Ballard embellished details about the story told in the film.

Ballard stated that, "Some things are definitely overreported." He did not go into the jungle by himself to rescue a little girl, nor did he kill a man to rescue a child. According to Ballard, the island rescue Operation Triple Take involved both minors and adults, while the film portrays all victims as children. Ballard claimed that his team not only rescued 54 minors, but 123 individuals at two additional locations. Colombian broadcaster Noticias Caracol reported that the real operation, known as "Operación Cristal 2," took place in Cartagena in October 2014 and led to the rescue of 54 minors; five suspects were prosecuted, four of whom were convicted and sentenced to 16 years’ imprisonment each, with one acquitted. The broadcaster reported that although a Cartagena appellate court upheld the convictions in October 2024, all four convicted traffickers remained free because of expired legal deadlines, and that authorities were seeking to recapture them.

The real-life O.U.R. has been criticized for its conduct during sting operations and has been accused of exaggerating claims regarding its work. The actual organization's practices have come under scrutiny, including using inexperienced donors and celebrities as part of its jump team, a lack of meaningful surveillance or identification of targets, failing to validate whether the people they intended to rescue were in fact actual trafficking victims, and conflating consensual sex work with sex trafficking. Ballard himself was removed as the head of O.U.R. following an internal investigation in 2023. In a December 2023 statement posted on its website, the organization said an independent law firm reached the conclusion that Ballard had "engaged in unprofessional behavior that violated O.U.R.'s policies and values."

Many experts in the anti-trafficking movement voiced concern about the movie's portrayal of human trafficking. Anti-trafficking experts noted that the movie's focus on human trafficking constitutes a very small segment of the overall problem, that trafficking is often perpetrated by people known to the victim rather than kidnapping by strangers, that anti-trafficking interventions have changed significantly since the ten-year-old story depicted in this movie, and that self-liberation rather than heroic rescues is the predominant way through which individuals escape trafficking situations.

=== QAnon connections ===
While the film does not mention any QAnon theories, critics and anti-trafficking experts have pointed out that the film distorts the reality of child exploitation and stokes QAnon conspiracy theories, referring to a "belief that a core group of devil-worshiping elite run the world". Both Ballard and star Caviezel have been public about their belief in conspiracy theories of the QAnon movement.

On NPR's All Things Considered, Mike Rothschild, author of The Storm Is Upon Us: How QAnon Became a Movement, Cult, and Conspiracy Theory of Everything, argued that the film is "being marketed to QAnon believers, it's being embraced by this community, and its leading actor is a huge part of the QAnon community".

While promoting the film in an interview with Jordan Peterson in July 2023, Ballard claimed to have recently raided a West African "baby factory" where children are sold for organ harvesting and "Satanic ritual abuse", echoing another QAnon myth. In July 2020, in a video post, he lent credence to a QAnon conspiracy theory that falsely accused furniture company Wayfair of laundering money gained from child sex trafficking.

Ballard has criticized those drawing a connection between the film and QAnon, saying, "They make zero connection to the actual story. It's very difficult to make that connection when it's actually based on a true story." He told The New York Times, "Some of these theories have allowed people to open their eyes, so now it's our job to flood the space with real information so the facts can be shared."

In an interview with Variety, the film's director Alejandro Monteverde responded to the QAnon allegations, characterizing them as "misconceptions" and saying that the movie's origins came from a network TV news segment on child sex trafficking which he saw two years before the QAnon movement emerged (work on the script began in 2015). He also said that he has to "keep [his] distance" from "people that are too close to the film that are in politics."

== Reception ==
=== Critical response ===
On the review aggregator website Rotten Tomatoes, 57% of 79 critics' reviews are positive, with an average rating of 5.8/10. The website's consensus reads: "Sound of Freedom is an effective and suspenseful call to action against human trafficking, yet not free of issues in its depiction of the sensitive subject matter." Metacritic, which uses a weighted average, assigned the film a score of 36 out of 100, based on 11 critics, indicating "generally unfavorable" reviews.

Variety's Owen Gleiberman gave the film a positive review, writing, "Let's assume that, like me, you're not a right-wing fundamentalist conspiracy theorist looking for a dark, faith-based suspense film to see over the holiday weekend… Even then, you needn't hold extreme beliefs to experience Sound of Freedom as a compelling movie that shines an authentic light on one of the crucial criminal horrors of our time, one that Hollywood has mostly shied away from." The Detroit News' Adam Graham gave the film a C+ grade, writing "Even as the film's pacing starts to thud ... its work has been done, competently if not altogether artfully. Sometimes, obvious works just fine." Film Threat's Alan Ng recommended the film, writing, "Sound of Freedom is almost as if you're listening to Tim Ballard tell his incredible story of rescuing children and having it dramatized onscreen. It's heartfelt, informative, and inspiring." National Review's Madeleine Kearns called the film "provocative and gripping," adding that it "remind[s] us that as long as children are being abused, no matter where they are or how many there are, the rest of us ought to care." Faith-based reviews were largely positive, while some writers criticized the film as having an unrealistic depiction of child sex trafficking, citing the young ages of the children kidnapped, the rarity of such kidnappings occurring, and kidnappings being done by those who the victims already know. The scene in which Ballard reunites a Honduran child with his father at an ICE office was also noted as being at odds with the real life separation of families by the agency that was occurring at the time of filming.

Glenn Kenny, writing for The New York Times, stated "The queasiness derives from the contemporary-thriller vibes of the police procedural material... Then there are the scenes in which actual child actors perform being prepped for provocative pictures by adult groomers. What are the ethics of depiction here? The makers of this film initially seem to be grappling with how to properly tell this story." He went on to say "The director Alejandro Monteverde does have some sense of flourish, what with several single-point perspective shots and considered dissolves," but concluded "Oddly, the picture's muted tone ultimately undercuts its solemn sense of mission." RogerEbert.com's Nick Allen was also negative, writing: "Sound of Freedom is a solemn, drawn-out bore with a not particularly bold narrative stance—caring about the safety of children is roughly the easiest cause for any remotely decent human being... But while being so committed to such solemnity and suffering, the truncated storytelling by co-writers Monteverde and Rod Barr neglects to flesh out its ideas or characters or add any more intensity to Ballard's slow-slow-slow burn search for two kids in particular (Lucás Ávila's Miguel and Cristal Aparicio's Rocío) whose faces haunt him."

Slate's Sam Adams said in his review that the film appears to be "a straightforward search-and-rescue thriller, in which Ballard, a special agent at the Department of Homeland Security, goes rogue to free a young girl from the clutches of a Colombian sex-trafficking ring. But it arrived in theaters surrounded by a cloud of innuendo put forth by its star and its noisiest right-wing supporters—conspiratorial insinuations about who doesn't want this story to be told and what real-world traffickers are really up to." The Times of Israel's Shira Li Bartov wrote that the film draws upon multiple conspiracy theories that include anti-Jewish canards, including the blood libel, while its star, actor Jim Caviezel, has floated antisemitic theories in interviews promoting the film.

The Telegraph's Ed Power gave the "bizarrely dull" film one star out of five, calling it a "creepy and breathtakingly dreary child trafficking thriller" whose success in American theaters "proves America is not only a different country – it's a different planet". Peter Bradshaw of The Guardian also panned it as "an odd, uncertainly acted, opaquely intended movie," while Wendy Ide gave it two stars out of five in a review for its sister paper The Observer, calling it both "an earnest and well-intentioned attempt to engage with a very real and harrowing issue" and "a thunderously crass and manipulative movie that is hampered by erratic pacing, pantomime bad guys and an overfondness for shots of Caviezel weeping God-fearing, manly tears."

=== Box office ===
Sound of Freedom grossed $184.2 million in the United States and Canada, and $66.4 million in other territories, for a worldwide total of $251 million. It is the tenth highest-grossing film of 2023 in the U.S. and Canada. By late-August 2023, it was considered "one of history's most successful independent films." In March 2024, Deadline Hollywood reported that of the film's box-office gross (at that point, $249.5 million), 52% ($129.6 million) went to "theater access costs", while 8% ($18.96 million) was withheld by taxes, 19% ($47.6 million) accounted for print and advertising costs, 14% ($47.6 million) served as payment to the filmmakers, and the remaining 7% ($17.8 million) returned to Angel Studios.

The film was released in the United States on July 4, 2023. Prior to its release, the film sold $10 million in ticket pre-sales at 2,626 theaters. According to /Film, the film received little coverage in the mainstream media leading up to its release. Originally, Sound of Freedom was projected to gross $11–15 million over its first week of release, with some estimates reaching $20 million. The film grossed $14.2 million on its first day of release, $3.6 million on its second, and $3.5 million on its third, for a Tuesday—Thursday total of $21.3 million, raising six-day estimates to $36 million. It went on to make $18.2 million in its opening weekend (with a six day total of $40.2 million), finishing third at the box office. Its success surprised many industry experts, especially considering it was only released in 2,850 theaters, considerably fewer than Insidious: The Red Door (3,188 theaters) and Indiana Jones and the Dial of Destiny (4,600 theaters). Playing in 3,265 theaters in its second weekend, the film made $24.7 million (an increase of 26%), finishing second behind newcomer Mission: Impossible – Dead Reckoning Part One. Sound of Freedom crossed the $100 million mark at the box office on 16th day of release. In its third weekend the film made $20.1 million, finishing third behind newcomers Barbie and Oppenheimer. Playing in 3,411 theaters the film continued to hold well in its fourth weekend of release, grossing $12.8 million and finishing in fourth.

After its opening week, rumors and videos on social media claimed that AMC Theatres was canceling screenings and disrupting viewing by inventing technical difficulties and disabling air conditioning. Angel Studios' head of theatrical distribution Brandon Purdie said "these rumors are not accurate" and stated that due to the positive reception and consumer demand, AMC had added 450 additional theaters on July 14.

=== Audience reception and faith-based appeal ===
The film, which various contemporary sources describe as a "Christian thriller", received highly positive reviews from viewers, at one point earning an audience score of 100% on Rotten Tomatoes. Some movie industry analysts attributed the film's success in part to its appeal to an overlooked segment of the film audience. "This is yet another example of a faith-based distributor breaking the rules and coming out a winner," Comscore senior analyst Paul Dergarabedian said. "[It] also shows that a grassroots marketing strategy and tapping into the power of the faith-based audience has proven to be a very effective method to generate profits."

Christian website MovieGuide attributed the film's unexpected success to its wide demographic appeal and strong moral values. Variety wrote that ticket buyers have been predominantly female, while more than 50% of cinemagoers were over the age of 45. One third of the audience has been Hispanic. Audiences polled by CinemaScore gave the film an "A+," a standard grade for faith-based titles.

The Los Angeles Times asserted that the film had become a part of the culture war, stating that "supporting the film has become a cause du jour for the MAGA crowd." The National Post argued that the film was an example of an independent studio "beat[ing] Hollywood at its own game."

=== Endorsements and special screening ===
Mel Gibson, Dana White, Elon Musk, Ben Shapiro, Jewel, Manny Pacquiao, Tim Tebow, and the Family Research Council endorsed the film. Donald Trump hosted a special screening at Trump National Golf Club Bedminster on the night of July 19, 2023.

A promotional video for the film, screened during Ballard's May 2025 testimony to the Brazilian Federal Senate, brands "Hidden War" as "Sound of Freedom II," invoking the 2023 film, and credits it as "Featuring Mel Gibson." According to box-office tracking, "worldwide gross was approximately US$4,561." Ballard stated on September 14, 2026, that Hidden War was scheduled for a worldwide theatrical release on November 14, 2026, and that he would be promoting the film in Latin America in the weeks following. In a separate video, Ballard stated on September 14, 2026, that he would be promoting Hidden War throughout Europe. In a September 4, 2026 YouTube video, Ballard said that "Sound of Freedom 2 is coming out" and that "Lionsgate is doing a docu-series". Naming LDS Church area president Kevin Pearson, "the state president", Matt Holland and Doug Anderson, he said "they are literally being casted right now in the film", and predicted that "two to 300 million will watch this one".

=== Accolades ===
For his performance in the film, Javier Godino won Best Actor in an International Production at the 32nd Actors and Actresses Union Awards.

== Legal disputes ==
In December 2025, the Utah Supreme Court heard an appeal in a defamation lawsuit against Angel Studios and Tim Ballard filed by Kely Suarez, who says she was a college student caught up in a raid in Colombia which Ballard was involved in. Suarez alleges she was defamed by the film's "Katy Giselle" character, described in press coverage as a "kingpin sex trafficker."

A lower court denied the defendants' Amended Special Motion to Dismiss under Utah's anti-SLAPP statute, finding the complaint stated a prima facie case for defamation. Angel Studios and Ballard appealed, and the Utah Supreme Court heard oral arguments on December 11, 2025. At the hearing, Suarez's attorney Cherise Bacalski argued that the "kingpin sex trafficker" characterization defamed her client; Angel Studios' attorney Robert Gutierrez argued the film carries disclaimers and that Katy Giselle was "a composite character in order to make it a subject matter the viewing public could actually watch," maintaining the film is a docudrama "based on a true story"; and Ballard's personal attorney, Mark Eisenhut, arguing separately from Angel Studios, said Ballard "was not involved in the movie-making itself" and that there is "no evidence of Ballard producing, writing, or directing the film."
