= Brisa De Angulo =

Bolivian activist

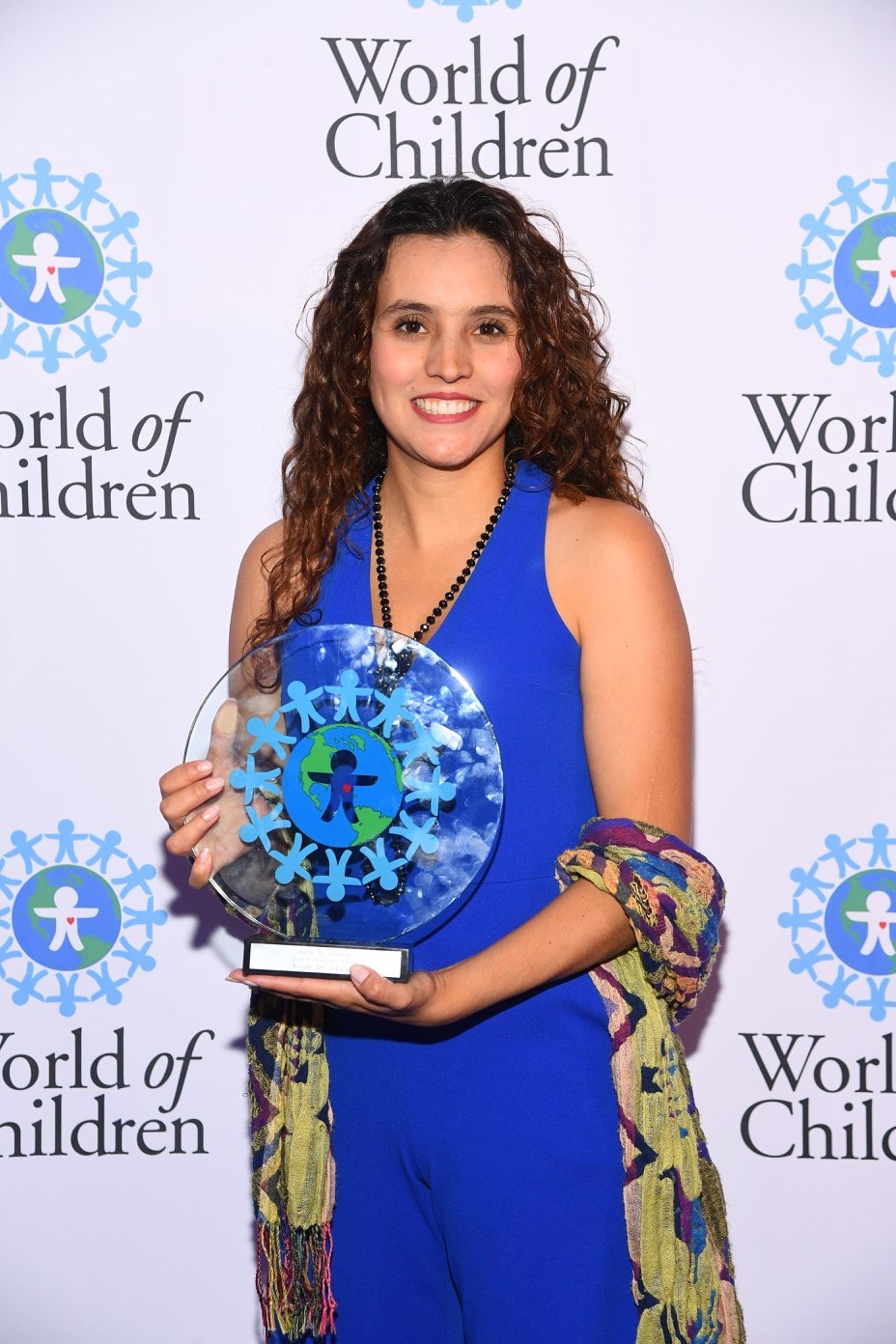
Brisa De Angulo at the World of Children Awards in 2019, photo by Parker Palmer

Brisa De Angulo is a Bolivian activist and campaigner for sexual abuse victims. She was assaulted at the age of 15 by a family member and won the case against Bolivian government in Inter-American Court of Human Rights, that her rights infringed during the judicial procedure. She is a recipient of 2018 CNN Hero, 2018 BBC World Outlook Winner and Mary Philbrook Public Service Award.

== Early life and activism ==
Angulo's family moved to the US from Bolivia when she was a young girl. Her parents were both survivors of domestic violence, with her father being a surgeon and public health advocate and mother being a health science educator. Her parents had a passion to help people which was also apparent in Brisa from a young age. At 7 years old, she began tutoring other children in her own backyard and at 14, founded Comunidad Educative para La Vida (CEV), a school providing a safe alternative to traditional educational institutions where children are often beaten and severely punished by their teachers.

At the age of 15, she was raped by a member of her extended family who was staying at the family house on the outskirts of Cochabamba. She was raped frequently over the course of eight months, during which she developed bulimia, anorexia, and attempted suicide twice.

After enduring eight months of sexual violencee, Angulo confided in her parents and sought legal help, but faced challenges finding representation and opposition from her community and even an arson attack on her family's home followed. Angulo endured three trials in Bolivia, yet her cousin, the perpetrator, remained unpunished. The Inter-American Court of Human Rights (IACtHR) heard the case of Brisa De Angulo Losada v. Bolivia, marking the first instance of the court addressing human rights violations against an adolescent victim of incest.

In 2004, at age of 17, she founded A Breeze of Hope, Bolivia's first-ever center for child survivors of sexual abuse.

Angulo met Beth Stephens, a professor of law, at Rutgers Law School, who helped her piece together her childhood sexual assault case. They collaborated to compile documents of De Angulo's multiple human rights abuses to bring to the IACHR.

During her second year of law school, she assisted in the establishment of a human rights clinic to handle her case, She also mobilised her Bolivian community and persuaded government authorities, including the President, to enact legislation designating August 9 as Bolivia's national day of solidarity with survivors and opposition to childhood sexual assault.

== Education ==
Angulo holds a Bachelor of Science in psychology from the Eastern University and a Master's of Science from Towson University. She also received a JD from Rutgers University.
