= K9s for Warriors =

American charity and veterans service organization

K9s For Warriors
- Formation: 2011
- Founder: Shari Duval
- Type: 501(c)(3)
- Purpose: Alternate therapy for helping veterans cope with Post-traumatic Stress Disorder (PTSD), Animal welfare
- Location: Ponte Vedra, Florida
- Region served: United States
- CEO: Daniel Bean
- Budget: $4.6 million in FY 2016
- Staff: 210
- Website: www.k9sforwarriors.org

K9s For Warriors is an American charity and veterans service organization that provides service dogs to veterans. The organization trains rescue dogs to help veterans coping with post-traumatic stress disorder (PTSD), traumatic brain injury, military sexual trauma, post-9/11 issues and other psychological challenges associated with military service.

== History ==
K9s For Warriors was founded in 2011 by Shari Duval who was inspired by her son, Brett Simon, a contractor who returned from two tours in Iraq and developed severe post-traumatic stress.

In 2024, Daniel Bean, a lawyer based in Jacksonville who had served as longtime board chair, was elected interim chief executive officer following the resignation of the previous CEO.

On April 16, 2024, the board voted to appoint Bean as CEO.

In June 2025, San Antonio City Council voted to terminate the city’s lease with K9s For Warriors and to purchase its facility next to Animal Care Services for $2 million. The city confirmed the organization had pulled 98 dogs from ACS since 2019, below the lease’s target of 200 dogs per year.

In February 2025, the organization’s Salute to Heroes Gala raised a record $1.1 million.

== Program ==
K9s For Warriors evaluates and trains rescued dogs before providing them to veterans as service dogs for no charge. The organization accommodates veterans during a three-week live-in program to facilitate bonding with a trained dog, following which the veterans are sent home along with their service dog. As of January 2019, K9s For Warriors has graduated 500 veteran-canine teams. The organization claims that 95% of dogs used in the program are rescues, with the other 5% coming from breeders or being surrendered by owners. In 2018, the organization opened its second training facility near Gainesville, Florida, named the Gold Family Campus.

As of March 2024, the organization had supplied 1,000 service dogs to veterans since 2011, and by May 2025 it reported completing over 1,000 pairings.

== Media coverage ==
There are many success stories of K9s For Warriors program beneficiaries. K9s For Warriors has been covered extensively in mainstream media.

In November 2015, New Orleans Saints head coach Sean Payton was nominated for the NFL's "Salute to Service" award for his work with K9s for Warriors.

Supermodel Kate Upton and husband Justin Verlander, an MLB player, have held fundraising events for K9s For Warriors and the SPCA. In 2017, it was covered by People magazine.

A documentary available to the public was released on a small scale in New York City in 2018. The documentary is called A New Leash on Life: The K9s For Warriors Story and was covered by FOX & Friends. It was produced by Emmy award-winning director Nick Nanton. The documentary was presented at the Suncoast Region Emmy awards where it won four Emmys for Direction, Editing, Photography and Documentary. Duval received the highest award the Daughters of the American Revolution presents, the Americanism Medal of Honor, at Continental Congress in June 2019.

== Scientific Studies ==
In 2015, K9s For Warriors entered into a partnership with Purdue University. The goal was to verify scientifically that service dogs are an effective treatment for veterans with PTSD. The study is one of the first published research studies to define the biobehavioral effects of service dogs on veterans with PTSD. This research found that compared to those on the waitlist, military veterans with a PTSD service dog reported lower PTSD symptoms, anxiety, and depression as well as better social functioning, better sleep, and less anger. Currently, a large-scale clinical trial is underway at the National Institutes of Health to further study the efficacy of service dogs for veterans with PTSD. The length of the trial allows for a better understanding of the interrelationships between psychological and behavioral processes, PTSD symptoms and service dogs.
