= Our Rescue =

U.S.-based nonprofit organization

- Founded: October 2013
- Founder: Tim Ballard
- Type: Non-governmental organization, non-profit organization
- Tax ID no.: 46-3614979
- Purpose: Humanitarian
- Region served: Global
- Key people: Derek Benner, CEO
- Website: ourrescue.org

Our Rescue, previously known as Operation Underground Railroad (abbreviated O.U.R., previously styled as “OUR Rescue”), is a United States–based non-governmental 501(c)(3) organization that works to combat human trafficking and child sexual exploitation through field operations, survivor support, and training and prevention programs. The group conducts anti–trafficking operations, both inside and outside the United States, and provides technological and financial assistance to law-enforcement agencies working to investigate sex trafficking crimes.

Our Rescue is headquartered in Minneapolis, Minnesota, maintains an office in Murray, Utah, and is led by CEO Derek Benner.

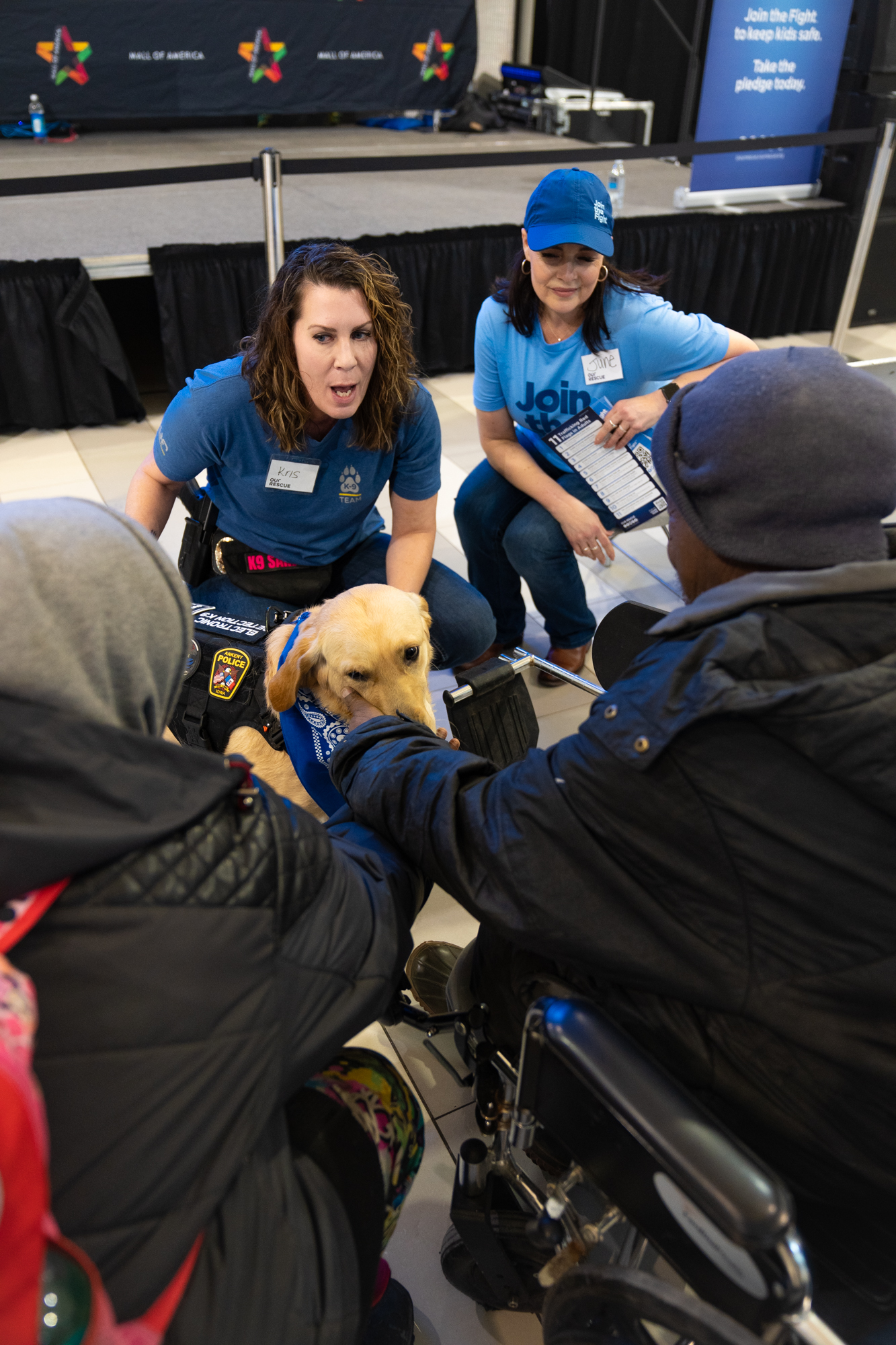
Our Rescue Jan 11 MOA Prevention Event

The organization was founded in 2013 by Tim Ballard. Its early work was later dramatized in the 2023 film Sound of Freedom, which was inspired by Ballard’s efforts at the formation of Operation Underground Railroad. In 2023, Ballard resigned as CEO.

== History ==
=== 2013–2022: Early years ===
Operation Underground Railroad was founded in 2013 by Tim Ballard. According to Ballard, he was frustrated with the lack of strategies employed to rescue kidnapped and trafficked children in underdeveloped nations, and the inability to prosecute offenders in non-U.S. related cases. He left government service in October 2013 to found Operation Underground Railroad.

In 2014, Our Rescue participated in a sting operation in Cartagena, Colombia.

Between 2015 and 2018, Our Rescue donated more than $170,000 to Washington State Patrol's "Net Nanny" sting program. The money was used for "additional detectives, hotels, food and overtime". Sergeant Carlos Rodriguez, the initiator of the sting program arranged positive media coverage for Our Rescue, solicited donations for them, and, upon his retirement in 2019, was employed by Our Rescue as their domestic coordinator.

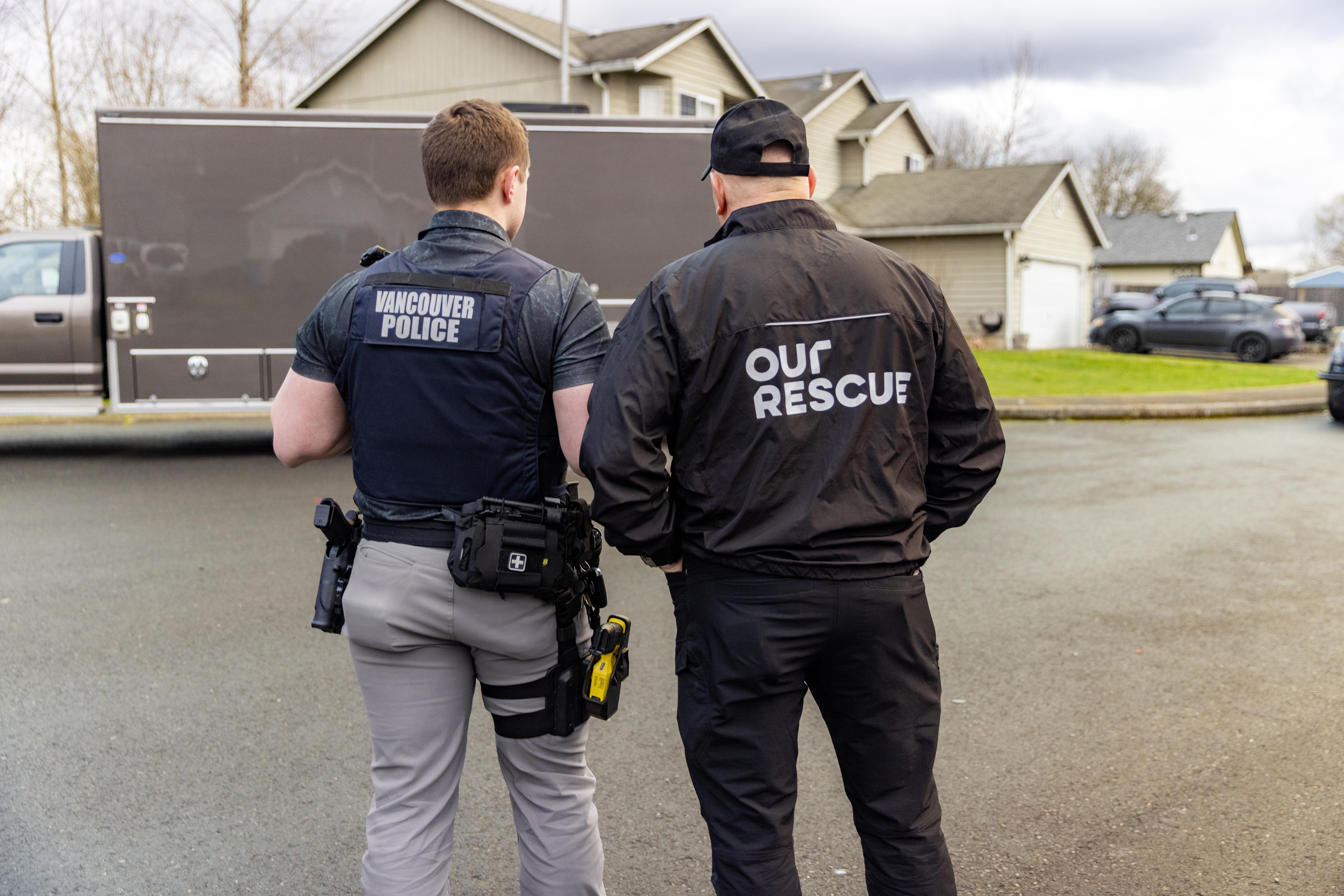
Vancouver Internet Crimes Against Children (ICAC) Officer with Our Rescue North American Operations Manager, Chaz Balogh

In February 2016, the Justice Department advised members of the Internet Crimes Against Children Task Force against "being involved in, assisting or supporting operations with" Operation Underground Railroad; the commander of ICAC's Washington branch stated in an email to state and local police that Operation Underground Railroad was not affiliated with ICAC and that "no task-force group should partner with O.U.R. or provide O.U.R. with 'any resources, equipment, personnel, training'."

In 2018, Pittsburgh Steelers coach Mike Tomlin went to Haiti "for a first-hand experience" with Our Rescue, which was filmed for ESPN.

In February 2020, Our Rescue paid for an adopted Wisconsin woman to visit her biological parents after she discovered that she had been stolen from them as a baby and trafficked through orphanage fraud. After using the DNA test to trace her heritage back to India and Israel, the woman found her ethnic minority Roma family that lived in Romania and had since moved to Italy.

A September 2020 Vice article reported that Operation Underground Railroad had attracted followers of QAnon conspiracy theories, while also noting that the organization denied any connection to QAnon.An August 2020 New York Times article quoted Ballard in the context of anti-trafficking organizations' responses to increased public attention from internet conspiracy theorists."

In April 2022, Our Rescue members attended an anti-trafficking summit in Cartagena, Colombia. In the same year, Our Rescue also provided investigative and undercover support in the arrests of pro-pedophilia activists Nelson Maatman, who fled to Mexico, and Marthijn Uittenbogaard and his partner, who both fled to Ecuador.

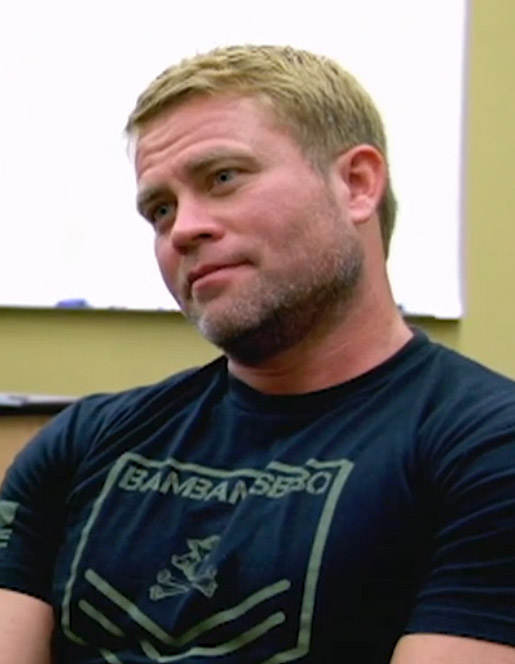
Founder Tim Ballard in 2018

=== 2023: Leadership change & Ballard sexual misconduct allegations ===
In 2023, Ballard stepped away from the organization after an internal investigation into sexual misconduct allegations made against him by multiple employees and later resigned.

Later, the organization was named in two separate lawsuits, in which the plaintiffs accused Tim Ballard of sexual assault, grooming, and coercion during sting operations. One lawsuit was completely dismissed in 2025, and the second was dismissed against O.U.R..

Matt Osborne was placed as the interim President and COO, when Ballard left.

In a December 2023 statement posted on its website, the organization said an independent law firm reached the conclusion that Ballard had "engaged in unprofessional behavior that violated OUR's policies and values".

=== 2024–present ===
On February 26, 2024, Tammy Lee, a corporate executive with experience at Delta Air Lines, Northwest Airlines, and the University of Minnesota Foundation, took over as the new CEO. In October 2024, the organization changed its name from Operation Underground Railroad to OUR Rescue and moved to Minneapolis, Minnesota. In April 2025, Derek Benner, the former Executive Associate Director of Homeland Security Investigations, was appointed as CEO. In August 2026, the Office of Refugee Resettlement under the Trump administration awarded the organization a $244 million no-bid contract to provide legal services for unaccompanied migrant children.

== Operations ==
=== Field operations ===
Our Rescue works against human trafficking by supporting law enforcement's identification of sexual predators, its survivor programs and its education and prevention initiatives.

The organization originally focused its efforts internationally, but following the new leadership it shifted its focus domestically. Our Rescue offers a guide called "Let’s Start Talking" on how parents can talk to children about online safety. They also go to schools with law enforcement to discuss online safety.

=== International operations ===
Our Rescue has reportedly participated in international law enforcement investigations in South America, Asia, and Europe related to trafficking or child exploitation.

In 2014, Our Rescue participated in a sting operation in Cartagena, Colombia.In 2022, Our Rescue also provided investigative and undercover support in the arrests of pro-pedophilia activists Nelson Maatman, who fled to Mexico, and Marthijn Uittenbogaard and his partner, who both fled to Ecuador.

=== Law enforcement support ===
Our Rescue provides training support for law enforcement related to trafficking and child exploitation prevention.

Between 2015 and 2018, Our Rescue donated more than $170,000 to Washington State Patrol's "Net Nanny" sting program. The money was used for "additional detectives, hotels, food and overtime." Sergeant Carlos Rodriguez, the initiator of the sting program, arranged positive media coverage for Our Rescue, solicited donations for them, and upon his retirement in 2019, was employed by Our Rescue as their domestic coordinator.

=== Survivor care ===
Our Rescue runs a non-profit survivor care program, providing medical and psychological services, education, and vocational opportunities to survivors. In January 2022, Our Rescue stated that in 2021 it provided survivor care in 30 countries. In February 2020, Our Rescue paid for an adopted Wisconsin woman to visit her biological parents after she discovered that she had been stolen from them as a baby and trafficked through orphanage fraud. After using a DNA test to trace her heritage back to India and Israel, the woman found her ethnic minority Roma family that lived in Romania and had since moved to Italy.

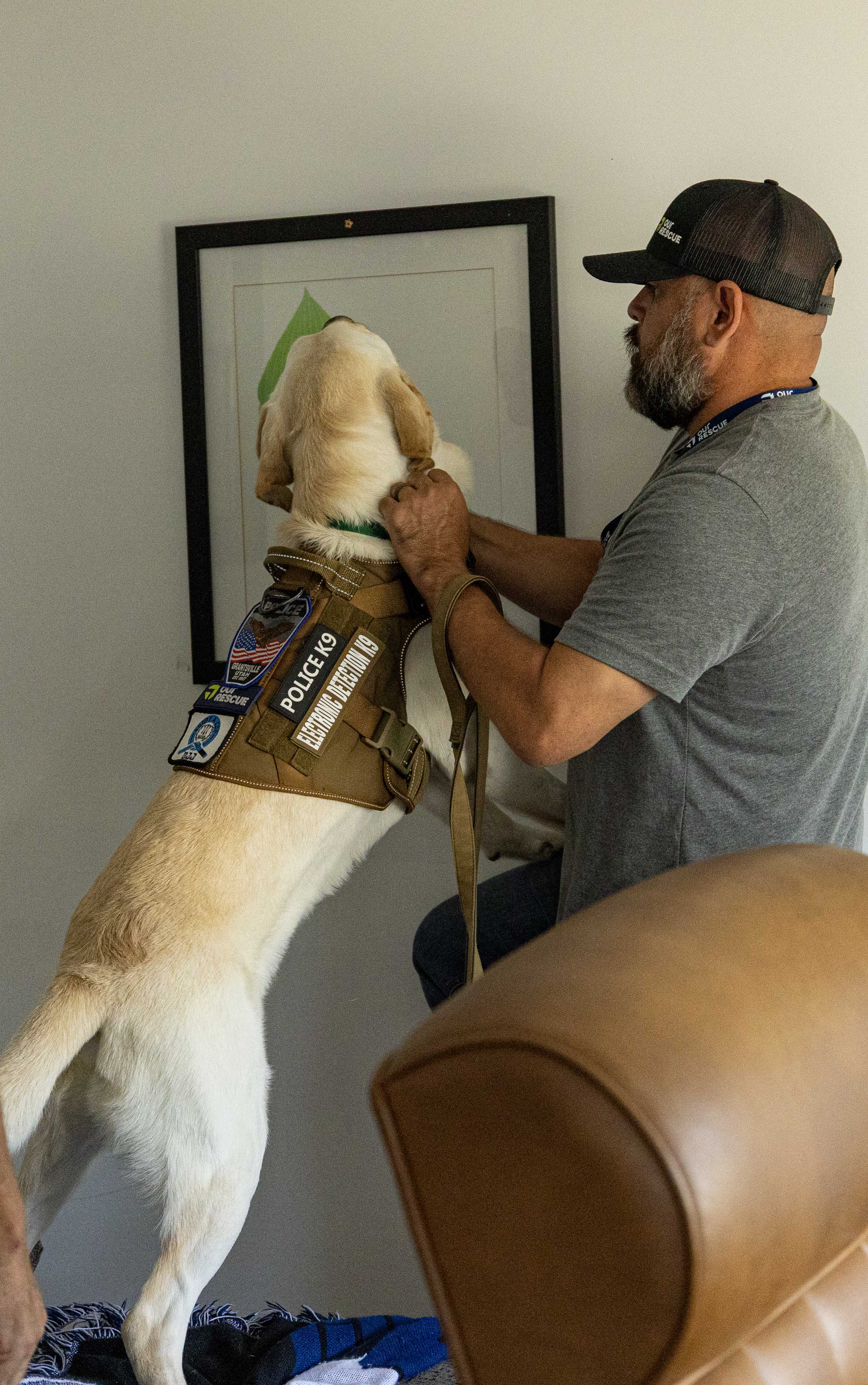
Bobby Bassett and ESD K9 Zero of Grantsville UT Police Department

=== ESD K-9 ===
Our Rescue trains dogs to detect electronic storage devices and donates them to police departments in several U.S. states and Thailand. Our Rescue assesses the needs of the area to select which agencies it will donate the dogs. These dogs are trained to smell SD cards in devices including cell phones, hard drives, and hidden cameras. Some are also trained to provide comfort to victims.

Dogs donated by Our Rescue have been connected to the arrests of individuals for child pornography.

== Finances ==
Our Rescue reported $6.9 million in revenues to the IRS in 2016, $22.3 million in 2019, and $50 million in revenue in 2023. According to Ministry Watch and ProPublica, the organization took in more than $45 million in 2020 and spent about $13.5 million on its work of allegedly rescuing sex trafficking victims – an unspent difference of $33.9 million; in 2021, it was $42 million, while spending $31 million; and in 2022, Our Rescue took in more than $27 million in donations, down from a peak of almost $46 million in 2020, and spent close to $32 million on program services. As of December 2022, Operation Underground Railroad had more than $60 million in assets.

In 2021, CEO Tim Ballard was paid $355,000 in salary and compensation. In 2022, he was paid $546,548.

In August 2026, Our Rescue received a no-bid federal contract worth $244,034,658 from the Office of Refugee Resettlement to provide legal representation for unaccompanied migrant children in ORR custody, awarded August 7, 2026, – about seven times the organization's reported 2025 assets of $36.9 million. Current CEO Derek Benner, who previously led U.S. Immigration and Customs Enforcement's Operation Paper Chase, was paid $413,387 in the same period.

== Criticism of operations under Founder Tim Ballard ==
According to Foreign Policy, in 2014, after OUR's first operation in the Dominican Republic, the National Council for Children and Adolescents didn't have the capacity to handle the 26 girls rescued, and released them in less than a week."

In a December 2020 article, Vice News said that Tim Ballard embellished Operation Underground Railroad's role in the rescue of a trafficked woman, stating that they did not find "outright falsehoods but a pattern of image-burnishing and mythology-building, a series of exaggerations that are, in the aggregate, quite misleading". A 2021 follow-up article further criticized Operation Underground Railroad's practices, including using inexperienced donors and celebrities as part of its jump team, a lack of meaningful surveillance or identification of targets, failing to validate whether the people they intended to rescue were in fact actual trafficking victims, and conflating consensual sex work with sex trafficking. Operation Underground Railroad's CEO Ballard reportedly consulted a psychic for intelligence on some missions.

In 2020 and 2021, the organization faced some criticism regarding its sting operations at that time and allegations that it exaggerated claims regarding its work.

A 2021 article by Meg Conley in Slate criticized an armed 2014 raid conducted by Operation Underground Railroad in the Dominican Republic, which Conley was present for and was filmed live by a camera crew to use in a proposed reality TV show, saying that it was likely to have traumatized the trafficked children. The children rescued in the raid were released a few weeks later, without having received the three months of rehabilitative care that was hoped to be provided. Anne Gallagher, an expert on the international law on human trafficking, wrote in 2015 that Operation Underground Railroad had an "alarming lack of understanding about how sophisticated criminal trafficking networks must be approached and dismantled" and called the work of Operation Underground Railroad "arrogant, unethical and illegal".One lawsuit was completely dismissed in 2025, and the second was dismissed against O.U.R..

In June 2022, Vice reported that Operation Underground Railroad falsely announced on its Twitter and Facebook accounts as well as on Ballard's Instagram account that Operation Underground Railroad had "partnered" with American Airlines and that the airline would show a video about Our Rescue's work on all domestic flights that month. American Airlines said that they had never had a partnership or affiliation with Operation Underground Railroad or ever shown any of their videos, and that they were "taking appropriate action to have these posts removed". Operation Underground Railroad released a statement that the apparent mix up was due to their advertising agency informing them of the deal with American Airlines, which was not finalized yet.

On November 27, 2023, Suzanne Whitehead filed a lawsuit in Utah's Third Judicial District Court against Utah Attorney General Sean Reyes, Ballard, and O.U.R. (the latter as Ballard's alleged alter ego), pleading a federal civil-rights claim under 42 U.S.C. § 1983 against Reyes for an alleged First Amendment violation, plus intentional and negligent infliction of emotional distress against all defendants. The complaint characterizes the suit as arising from Reyes's alleged suppression of Whitehead's free speech and a claimed Ballard-O.U.R. effort to silence her as a witness to alleged fraud, brought under the court's concurrent federal-question jurisdiction. In August 2024 the Utah Court dismissed the case against O.U.R. with prejudice and dismissed the case against Ballard without prejudice. The case against Reyes had already been dropped following discussions between Whitehead and Reyes.

== Media appearances ==
- In 2016, The Abolitionists, a documentary produced by Gerald Molen, featured the first operations undertaken by Ballard and Operation Underground Railroad.
- Another documentary from director Nick Nanton, Operation Toussaint, was produced in 2018, which featured an operation in Haiti that had the support of Haitian President Jovenel Moïse and former U.S. congresswoman Mia Love of Utah. Deseret News movie critic Josh Terry described Operation Toussaint as "an engrossing and expert production", but also said it "feels more like a promotional film than a strictly traditional documentary".
- The documentary Triple Take (2020) was filmed about sting operations in Colombia.
- A feature film, Sound of Freedom, starring Jim Caviezel as Tim Ballard, was announced in 2018, and released in theaters in 2023.
- In 2025, Hiding in Plain Sight: America's Trafficking Epidemic, a documentary directed by Nick Nanton, exposes the harsh reality of sex trafficking and child exploitation in the United States, showing that the crisis is one affecting communities across the nation.
- In 2026, the "Digital White Van" webinar, hosted by Our Rescue and in collaboration with DHS Center for Countering Human Trafficking, Blue Campaign, the Department of Homeland Security national public awareness project Know2Protect, the Yahoo Paranoids Team, and SEARCH, The National Consortium for Justice Information and Statistics. The webinar provided information on how families can best protect children in an online world.
