= Born to Be Wild (disambiguation) =

"Born to Be Wild" is a 1968 rock song by Steppenwolf.

Born to Be Wild may also refer to:

== Film ==
- Born to Be Wild (1938 film), an action/drama written by Nathanael West
- Born to Be Wild (1995 film), an American family comedy
- Born to Be Wild (2011 film), an American 3D IMAX documentary about orphaned orangutans and elephants

== Television ==
=== Shows ===
- Born to Be Wild (TV program), a 2007 Philippine travel and wildlife program

=== Episodes ===
- "Born to Be Wild" (Roseanne), a 1990 episode
- "Born to Be Wild", a 1992 episode of Hey Dad..!
- "Born to Be Wild", a 1997 episode of Noah's Island
- "Born to Be Wild", a 1999 episode of The Wild Thornberrys
- "Born to Be Wild", a 2006 episode of Casualty
- "Born to Be Wild", a 2007 episode of Jungle Beat
- "Born to Be Wild" (SpongeBob SquarePants), a 2007 episode
- "Born to Be Wild", ninth episode of the 2009 series My Almost Famous Family
- "Born to Be Wild", first episode of the 2013 miniseries North America
- "Born to Be Wild", a 2015 episode of Outrageous Acts of Science
- "Born to Be Wild", a 2018 episode of 24 Hours in A&E
- "Born to be Wild", a 2019 episode of Orangutan Jungle School

== Music ==
- Born to Be Wild (Ann-Margret album), 2023
- Born to Be Wild (MC Shan album), 1988
- Born to Be Wild – A Retrospective, a 1991 album by Steppenwolf

== See also ==
- Born to Be Mild (disambiguation)
