= Jungle Beat 2: The Past =

- Directed by: Sam Wilson; Brent Dawes
- Written by: Sam Wilson
- Based on: Jungle Beat by Brent Daws
- Produced by: Jacqui Cunningham; Phil Cunningham; Tim Keller; Rita Mbanga
- Starring: David Menkin; Ina Marie Smith
- Production companies: Sunrise Productions; Sandcastle Studios
- Distributed by: Indigenous Film Distribution
- Release dates: 10 April 2025 (Russia); 26 June 2025 (South Africa)
- Running time: 91 minutes
- Countries: South Africa; Mauritius
- Language: English
- Box office: $329,800

Jungle Beat 2: The Past is a 2025 animated adventure film directed by Sam Wilson and Brent Dawes. It serves as the sequel to the 2020 animated film Jungle Beat: The Movie.

The film was first released in Russia on 10 April 2025, and was later released in South Africa on 26 June 2025.

== Cast ==
- David Menkin as Munki, a monkey
- Ina Marie Smith as Trunk, an elephant

== Release ==
In January 2025, SC Films International picked up the worldwide sales for the film. Jungle Beat 2: The Past was first released in Russia on 10 April 2025, and was later released in South Africa on 26 June 2025.
