= David (2025 film) =

Animated musical biblical film

- Theatrical release poster
- Directed by: Brent Dawes; Phil Cunningham
- Written by: Brent Dawes; Kyle Portbury; Sam Wilson
- Based on: Book of Samuel
- Produced by: Steve Pegram; Tim Keller; Rita Mbanga
- Starring: Phil Wickham; Brandon Engman; Asim Chaudhry; Miri Mesika; Mick Wingert; Will de Renzy-Martin; Lauren Daigle; Mark Jacobson
- Edited by: Tom Scott
- Music by: Joseph Trapanese
- Production companies: 2521 Entertainment; Slingshot Productions; Sunrise Animation Studios
- Distributed by: Angel (United States); Empire Entertainment (South Africa)
- Release date: December 19, 2025
- Running time: 109 minutes
- Countries: South Africa; United States
- Language: English
- Budget: $60.9 million
- Box office: $91 million

David is a 2025 animated epic biblical musical drama film featuring David from the Book of Samuel in the Old Testament. The film stars Phil Wickham, Brandon Engman, Asim Chaudhry, Miri Mesika, Mick Wingert, Will de Renzy-Martin, and Lauren Daigle. It is a follow-up to the five-part television miniseries Young David and tells the story of a young Israelite shepherd, poet and warrior who is predestined to become the new King of Israel. He embarks on a journey from beyond the shadow of an evil Philistine giant named Goliath to prove to his people that true power lies not in a kingship but in faith and freedom.

David was released in theaters in the United States on December 19, 2025, by Angel Studios. The film received mostly positive reviews from critics and grossed $91 million, with more releases scheduled for international markets in 2026. It was added to Netflix on June 3, 2026, and by June 5 was the streaming platform's top film in the United States.

== Plot ==
In 1000 BC Bethlehem, Israel, David is a young musician from the Tribe of Judah who tends his father Jesse's flock of sheep. After protecting the flock from an Asian lion that is stalking them, David is called before the prophet Samuel, who anoints him as the future King of Israel. Samuel leaves when the palace guards arrive to retrieve David to play the lyre for King Saul in Gibeah. David soothes Saul with a beautiful song, who has become troubled as God has rejected him as king.

Saul is alerted when the Philistine army, led by King Achish, have arrived to battle the Israelite army. In the Valley of Elah, Achish and the Philistines bring forth their champion, Goliath, a nine-foot giant. Goliath taunts Saul, his son Jonathan, and the Israelites to summon a worthy challenger in besting him. Firm in his faith in God, David, having been sent by Jesse to deliver supplies under the encouragement of his mother Nitzevet, decides to challenge Goliath in a single combat himself. Saul dresses David in his armor, but they are too oversized for him. Instead, David retrieves smooth stones from a nearby riverbank and approaches Goliath, whom he kills with a stone slung from a sling to his forehead. Inspired by David's victory, the Israelites defeat Achish and the Philistine army.

Years later, David matures into a young adult soldier in Saul's army, forming a strong friendship with Jonathan. Unsettled by David's growing popularity, Saul announces that they will launch a attack upon the Philistine town of Ziklag with David leading in the charge. When the Israelite army arrives, they find the Philistines have abandoned the town out of fear of the Amalekites. Back in the palace, as David plays his lyre, Saul remembers the incident that made him lose his kingship, by disobedience to God for sparing the Amalekites to exploit despite being ordered to slay them. He realizes that David is the prophesied King, and throws a spear at him out of betrayal. As David flees for his life, Saul accuses him of attempted murder. When David is cornered, Jonathan fires an arrow at a construction site, knocking down a statue of Saul and helping David escape.

Outraged, Saul and his army pursue after David, killing those whoever assist him. David's family flee from Bethlehem to escape persecution. David collapses in the desert due to dehydration, but is revived and takes shelter inside a cave. There, David is reunited with his family and the other Israelites who are fleeing from Saul. Those inside the cave are told of Samuel's prophecy, but David insists he remains loyal to Saul. Meanwhile, Saul's army approach the cave. Dehydrated, Saul drinks from a waterfall inside the cave. Hidden nearby, David's friends encourage him to kill Saul, but he decides to spare him instead by only cutting a corner of his robe. He reveals himself to Saul and his army, proving that he does not want to take the throne. Moved by David's actions and peaceful apprach, Saul partially reconciles with him, but quickly pulls away and leaves with his army.

This allows David's family and their allies to finally come out of hiding, and they camp in Ziklag. Before long, Achish learns that Saul no longer acquires David as the Israelites' champion and leads the Philistines in returning to challenge them as revenge for their humiliating defeat. David, his brother Eliab, and their warriors infiltrate the Philistine ranks to assist Saul and the Israelites. On the battlefield, they see smoke rising from Ziklag and realize that their families are under attack. As Saul and Jonathan are killed by the Philistines, David and his warriors rush home to find that their families have been taken away by the Amalekites. As a result, the others blame David for the loss.

Faithful in God's deliverance, David approaches the Amalekites unarmed and is taken prisoner. As the Amalekite chieftain prepares to execute him in front of the Israelites, David begins to sing that he is unafraid, giving the Israelites the confidence to join in defiance. Eliab and David's warriors arrive on the battlefield to drive the Amalekites and liberate the Israelites. David later recovers from the attempted execution shortly after, and the Israelites recognize him as their new King.

== Voice cast ==
- Phil Wickham as David: A shepherd from Bethlehem, who plays lyre and composes poetry.
  - Brandon Engman as young David
- Miri Mesika as Nitzevet: The mother of David.
- Sloan Lucas Muldown as Zeruiah: The younger sister of David.
  - Ashley Boettcher as teen Zeruiah
- Hector as Jesse: The father of David
- Jonathan Shaboo as Eliab: David's oldest brother who serves as a soldier in Saul's army with Abinadab.
- Jack Wagman as Abinadab, David's 2nd elder brother.
- Brian Stivale as Samuel: The prophet who anoints David
- Mark Jacobson as Jonathan: The son of Saul and prince of Israel
- Adam Michael Gold as Saul: King of Israel
- Asim Chaudhry as King Achish: The monarch of Gath
- Mick Wingert as Zaydel
- Will de Renzy-Martin as Vaizatha: Named after the son of Persian vizier Haman. An Amalekite chieftain who is presumably a descendant of King Agag and an ancestor of Haman.
- Lauren Daigle as Rebecca
- Kamran Nikhad as Goliath

== Production ==
=== Development ===
In October 2021, after their success with Jungle Beat and Jungle Beat: The Movie, co-writer, co-director and co-executive producer Phil Cunningham and co-executive producer Jaqui Cunningham announced, with a demo video, that Sunrise Animation Studios would produce Angel Studios' first animated musical film about the life of David based on the Book of Samuel found in the Old Testament which Cunningham had conceived from his childhood in Africa while reading David's story in the Bible and a quote from Acts 13:22: "I have found in David, son of Jesse, a man after my own heart". Cunningham and Angel Studios co-founder Jordan Harmon stated that the intention for David was to bring back animated biblical stories for the whole world to enjoy. Kirk Cameron informed his YouTube viewers about his support for Angel Studios and Sunrise Animation Studios in creating the film and urged them to invest in the project through crowdfunding.

The screenplay was written by Brent Dawes and Kyle Portbury, with additional writing by Sam Wilson. Portbury, an Emmy Award-winning Australian writer-director, relocated his family to Cape Town during production. His involvement came through the film's technical director, a personal contact who recommended him after the directors identified the need for an additional writer.

In order to conduct the research for David, the production team travelled to Israel and engaged with the environment with their tour guide, including the pottery from David's time and a 3000-year-old juglet used for decanting oil that they purchased. The team visited locations relevant to their research including the original city of Jerusalem, Hezekiah's tunnel, the Pool of Siloam and the Israel Museum. They continued with a focus on the Valley of Elah and Ziklag, a local shop and concert area where they hiked to Qeiyafa (Shaaraim), where they viewed the battlefield between the Israelites and the Philistines. They also covered most of the scenery of Wadi Qilt, using drone footage to create a sense of scale and space and covered their barefoot walk around in the Roman aqueduct, the monastery, Jericho and the Dead Sea. After that, they conducted a ride on camels through the Kana`im Valley in the Judaean Desert from Kear Hanokdim, an oasis between the city of Arad and the citadel of Masada, to the Bedouin hospitality. They documented in the footage of the artifacts including a demonstration of how to make pots, in an effort to demonstrate their reconstructive work to the public. They also swam in the Sea of Galilee at Tiberias. Lastly, they provided an overview of the geography and essence of the Valley of Elah, where the battle between David and Goliath is said to have happened, during springtime by walking through a riverbed where David would have collected the stones for his sling.

In December 2021, Cunningham, co-writer and co-director Brent Dawes and art director Lynton Levengood streamed live about the concept art, animation, set design and color keys of David.

=== Casting ===
In June 2022, it was revealed that Brandon Engman would reprise his titular role as David from Young David. In October 2025, it was reported that Phil Wickham would voice the adult David, with Asim Chaudhry, Mick Wingert, Will de Renzy-Martin, and Lauren Daigle also joining the cast.

== Soundtrack ==
Joseph Trapanese was subsequently hired to compose the score for David. Lyricists contributed varied expertise to the soundtrack; Grammy Award-winner Jonas Myrin wrote songs that captured David's boyish energy, while Messianic Jewish singer Marty Goetz and his daughter Misha Hoyt ensured that the translated Hebrew carried authenticity. It was recorded in Budapest with music director Jason Halbert and the Budapest Film Orchestra. Upon release, the album debuted at number 20 on the Billboard Top Christian Albums chart, later peaking at number 5. On the Top Soundtracks chart, the album reached number 14. It featured six charted songs, "Psalm 8", "Follow the Light", "Shalom", "Adventure Song", "Why God - My God", and "Tapestry", which charted at respective positions of numbers 28, 29, 30, 35, 43, and 44 on the Billboard Hot Christian Songs chart.

=== Track listing ===
All tracks are written by Jonas Myrin, Rhyan Shirley, Marty Goetz, Misha Goetz, Joseph Trapanese, Brock Monroe Baker, Molly Kate Kestner, Chad Carouthers, Phil Wickham, and Jonathan Smith.

No.	Title	Performer(s)	Length
1.	"Adventure Song"	Brandon Engman	2:35
2.	"Samuel's Blessing"	Brian Stivale	1:43
3.	"Shalom"	Brandon Engman; Cast	2:34
4.	"Tapestry"	Brandon Engman; Miri Mesika	3:41
5.	"I Will Not Be Afraid (Red Fields)"	Brandon Engman	1:24
6.	"Victory Song"	Brian Stivale; Michelle Schorp; Daron Maughon; Misha Goetz; Marty Goetz; Chad Carouthers	1:40
7.	"Follow the Light"	Brandon Engman; Phil Wickham; Cast	3:36
8.	"Why God - My God"	Phil Wickham; Miri Mesika	3:28
9.	"I Will Not Be Afraid"	Phil Wickham; Cast	2:13
10.	"Follow the Light (Reprise) - I Will Not Be Afraid Medley"	Cast	1:46
11.	"23"	Phil Wickham	3:41
12.	"Psalm 8"	Phil Wickham	3:47
Total length:			35:45

=== Accolades ===
Year	Organization	Nominee / work	Category	Result	Ref.
2026	Dove Awards	"Psalm 8"	Inspirational Recorded Song of the Year	Nominated	
2026	Dove Awards	"Follow the Light"	Children's Recorded Song of the Year	Won	
2026	Dove Awards	David (Soundtrack from the Angel Original Film)	Christmas/Special Event Album of the Year	Won	

=== Charts ===
Weekly chart performance for David (Soundtrack from the Angel Original Film)
Chart (2026)	Peak position
US Soundtrack Albums (Billboard)	14
US Top Christian Albums (Billboard)	5

== Release ==
=== Domestic ===
David was originally scheduled for November 21, 2025, with Angel Studios set to distribute the film. However, in October 2024, Slingshot Productions terminated its distribution agreement with Angel, citing "multiple alleged incurable contract breaches". Slingshot filed a lawsuit against Angel in March 2025, alleging a "hostile takeover", and began seeking a new distributor for the film. In August 2025, Dallas Jenkins' 5&2 Studios attempted to take over the distribution of the film in a new deal with Slingshot. In October 2025, Angel Studios, in partnership with 2521 Entertainment, acquired the complete film and television franchise rights of David from Slingshot USA, and rescheduled the theatrical release to December 19, 2025.

=== International ===
David follows a phased international release beginning in December 2025. After opening in the United States and Canada, the film debuted internationally in mid-December 2025 in Portugal, Australia, New Zealand, Lebanon, South Africa, Singapore, Nigeria, and Ghana. The rollout continued into early 2026 with releases in Brazil and Sri Lanka in January and Israel on February 28.

The film received its widest international release in March 2026, spanning much of Europe and Latin America, including France, Germany, Austria, Switzerland, Belgium, the Netherlands, Poland, the Balkans, and most Central and South American territories. Additional European releases followed in April 2026 in Hungary and Spain. Japan is scheduled to release the film on 1 January 2027.

== Reception ==
=== Box office ===
As of August 30, 2026, David has grossed $80.4 million in the United States and Canada, and $10.4 million in other territories, for a worldwide total of $90.7 million.

In the United States and Canada, David was released alongside Avatar: Fire and Ash, The SpongeBob Movie: Search for SquarePants, and The Housemaid, and was projected to gross $20–25 million from 3,100 theaters. The film made $9.8 million on its first day, including $1.8 million from Thursday night previews. It went on to debut to $22 million, finishing in second behind Fire and Ash and ahead of SpongeBob. Its opening broke the record for the highest weekend debut for an animated biblical film, which was previously held by The King of Kings ($19.4 million), another 2025 film released by Angel. In its second weekend, David grossed $12.5 million and finished in sixth place. The film then grossed $7.7 million in its third weekend and finished in seventh place.

=== Critical response ===
On the review aggregator website Rotten Tomatoes, 80% of 54 critics' reviews are positive. The website's consensus reads: "David is as likable as its scrappy hero, offsetting its predictability with gorgeously animated backgrounds and a universally appreciable moral." Metacritic, which uses a weighted average, assigned the film a score of 55 out of 100, based on six critics, indicating "mixed or average" reviews. Audiences polled by CinemaScore gave the film an average grade of "A" on an A+ to F scale, while those surveyed by PostTrak gave it an 85% overall positive score, with 71% saying they would definitely recommend the film.

Calum Marsh of The New York Times found the film "preachy", criticizing the pacing, but described the animation as "surprisingly magnificent". Richard Roeper of RogerEbert.com gave the film three out of four stars and wrote that it "has the highly detailed, brightly colored and screen-popping visuals of a DreamWorks or Disney film, a bounty of catchy tunes, and a storyline that manages to be faithful to the Books of Samuel, even as most of the characters talk as if they're modern Americans."
