= Phil Cunningham =

Phil Cunningham may refer to:

- Phil Cunningham (basketball) (born 1966), basketball coach
- Phil Cunningham (folk musician) (born 1960), Scottish accordionist
- Phil Cunningham (rock musician) (born 1974), English guitarist
- Phil Cunningham (producer), executive producer of Jungle Beat and other animation
