= Young David (miniseries) =

American animated television miniseries

- Genre: Christian media; Adventure comedy; Animation
- Created by: Phil Cunningham
- Based on: 1 Samuel
- Starring: Brandon Engman; Sloan Muldown; David Rosenber; Edan Moses
- Composer: Andries Smit
- Countries of origin: South Africa; United States
- Original language: English
- No. of seasons: 1
- No. of episodes: 5

Production
- Executive producers: Phil Cunningham; Jacqui Cunningham
- Camera setup: Charl Collocott
- Running time: 6 minutes
- Production companies: Minno; Angel Studios; Slingshot Productions; Sunrise Productions

Original release
- Release: November 10, 2023 – March 8, 2024

Related
- David

Young David is a Christian five-part animated television miniseries created by Phil Cunningham, based on 1 Samuel featuring the character of the same name, distributed by Angel Studios and produced by Minno with Sunrise Productions and Slingshot Productions. It follows the humble beginnings of young David as a shepherd, a warrior, a musician, and a poet.

The series serves as a prequel for the animated film, David, which was released on December 19, 2025.

== Synopsis ==
Young David explores the developmental years of young David as a shepherd, as a warrior, as a musician, and as a poet.

== Cast and characters ==
- Brandon Engman voices David: A young shepherd from Bethlehem, who plays lyre and composes poetry.
- Sloan Muldown voices Zeruiah: The younger sister of David.
- David Rosenber voices Doeg: The hostile head shepherd of King Saul.
- Edan Moses voices Eliab: The oldest brother of David.

== Episodes ==
Episodes released monthly on both Minno and Angel Studios, beginning on November 10, 2023 and ended on March 8, 2024.

No.	Title	Directed by	Written by	Original release date
1	"Warrior"	Brent Dawes and Phil Cunningham	Brent Dawes	November 10, 2023
2	"King"	Brent Dawes and Phil Cunningham	Brent Dawes and Kyle Portbury	December 8, 2023
3	"Shepherd"	Brent Dawes and Phil Cunningham	Brent Dawes	January 12, 2024
4	"Poet"	Brent Dawes and Phil Cunningham	Brent Dawes	February 9, 2024
5	"Worshipper"	Brent Dawes and Phil Cunningham	Brent Dawes	March 8, 2024

== Production ==
The episodes of the series were kept short due to the cost of animation. The series features two original songs from award-winning artist Jonas Myrin. In November 2023, it was announced that Minno would be releasing an illustrated companion picture book. The book would correspond to each episode of the series.
