= Tuttle Twins =

Animated series based on children's books about economics

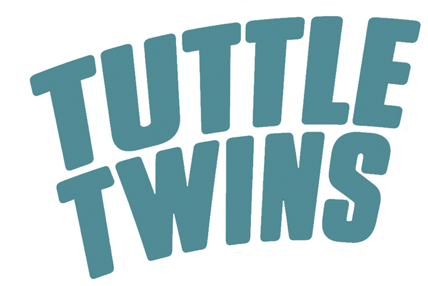
- Genre: Children's; Educational; Adventure
- Created by: Daniel Harmon
- Based on: The Tuttle Twins by Connor Boyack and Elijah Stanfield
- Showrunner: Daniel Harmon
- Written by: Jonny Vance
- Voices of: Jonny Vance; Sara Johnson; William Lucas; Blake Brust
- Theme music composer: Sam McCartney
- Country of origin: United States
- No. of seasons: 4
- No. of episodes: 44

Production
- Executive producer: Connor Boyack
- Producers: Jordyn Curley; Josh Stofferahn
- Running time: 22 minutes
- Production companies: Angel Studios; Harmon Brothers

Original release
- Release: June 30, 2021 – present

Tuttle Twins is an American educational animated series distributed by Angel Studios and produced by Tuttle Twins Show LLC, based on the book series of the same name by Connor Boyack. First released on June 30, 2021, the series follows twin siblings Ethan and Emily Tuttle, who travel through space and time with their grandmother Gabby to meet historical figures and learn lessons about topics related to libertarianism and anti-communism.

In May 2025, it was announced that the series would be added to Argentina's public children's network Pakapaka under President Javier Milei to promote free market economics.

== Premise ==
The series involves 11-year-old Cuban-American twin siblings Ethan Tuttle and Emily Tuttle and their grandmother Gabby. In most episodes, Gabby uses a modified wheelchair to take the twins, a raccoon named Derek, and (in Season 3) a robot named Ro-Burt on adventures (often through time) in which they meet famous individuals, historical figures, or other characters and learn lessons in order to fill the fuel container on Gabby's wheelchair with a liquid substance called "knowledge juice" so they can return home.

== Characters ==
=== Main ===
- Ethan Tuttle (voiced by Jonny Vance) is Emily's twin brother and Gabby's grandson. In several episodes, it is mentioned that he has IBS.
- Emily Tuttle (voiced by Alex Hall in half of season 1, Sara Johnson in seasons 1–3) is Ethan's twin sister and Gabby's granddaughter.
- Gabby (voiced by William Lucas) is Ethan and Emily's maternal grandmother. She is a first-generation Cuban-American. She uses a wheelchair time machine to take herself, her twin grandchildren, and her raccoon Derek to different time periods, and in some cases, different dimensions. Her full name is Gabriella Villanueva De Los Santos Ron Pablo Jones.
- Derek (voiced by Alex Elkin) is a raccoon who accompanies Ethan, Emily and Gabby on their time-traveling adventures. In a few episodes, he makes appearances as a superhero named Dark Dumpster Derek. In "Wonky Wages", the Tuttles see a younger version of Gabby find what appears to be a younger version of Derek in Havana, Cuba in 1940, although Gabby explains that the raccoon she had found back then was "a different Derek". In "Kidnappers & Capitalism", Derek is revealed to be an alien who was supposed to run for president on his original home planet with the help of an intelligence-enhancing substance that he was supposed to drink.
- Roburt (or Ro-Burt) (voiced by Christopher Pinesworth) is a robot built by the Tuttles that makes his first appearance in "The College Conundrum".

=== Recurring ===
- Copernicus (voiced by Blake Brust) is a friend of the Tuttle twins who is characterized as not being the brightest.
- Karinne Carmichael (voiced by Natalie Madsen) is the series' main antagonist. She regards Karl Marx as her idol, and her red uniform is a reference to the flags of communist countries. It is implied in some episodes that she secretly has feelings for Ethan, which she denies.
- Lyle
- Eugene Tuttle (voiced by Corey Landis) is Ethan and Emily's father.
- Julia Tuttle (voiced by Rachel Strauss-Muniz) is Ethan and Emily's mother and Gabby's daughter.
- Vanessa Carmichael (voiced by Lydia Meadows) is Karinne's mother.
- Richard Carmichael (voiced by Trenton James) is Karinne's father.

== Background and production ==
Tuttle Twins is based on a series of children's books written by Connor Boyack and published by the Libertas Institute, of which Boyack is the president.

- The Tuttle Twins Learn About the Law (November 20, 2014)
- The Tuttle Twins Learn About the Constitution (November 20, 2014)
- The Tuttle Twins and the Miraculous Pencil (July 14, 2015)
- The Tuttle Twins and the Road to Freedom (April 2, 2016)
- The Tuttle Twins and the Creature from Jekyll Island (November 14, 2016)
- The Tuttle Twins and the Search for Atlas
- The Tuttle Twins and their Spectacular Show Business
- The Tuttle Twins and the Sign of the Dollar (March 20, 2017)
- The Tuttle Twins and the Fate of the Future (2017)
- The Tuttle Twins and the Food Truck Fiasco (April 26, 2018)
- The Tuttle Twins and the Golden Rule (November 16, 2018)
- The Tuttle Twins and the Road to Surfdom (June 12, 2019)
- The Tuttle Twins and the Mystery of the Missing Child (March 11, 2020)
- The Tuttle Twins and the Education Vacation
- The Tuttle Twins and the Messed Up Market
- The Tuttle Twins and the Leviathan Crisis
- The Tuttle Twins and the 12 Rules Boot Camp
- The Tuttle Twins and the Medals of Merit
- The Tuttle Twins Dumpster Derek Returns

Angel Studios raised $4.6 million in equity crowdfunding to produce an animated series based on the Tuttle Twins books. The series is produced in association with Harmon Brothers.

== Episodes ==
| Season | Episodes | Originally released | |
| Season | Episodes | First released | Last released |
|---|---|---|---|
| 1 | 12 | June 30, 2021 | November 1, 2022 |
| 2 | 12 | March 7, 2023 | December 5, 2023 |
| 3 | 10 | May 7, 2024 | March 5, 2025 |
| 4 | 10 | November 4, 2025 | August 4, 2026 |

=== Season 1 (2021–22) ===
| No. overall | No. in season | Title | Original release date |
|---|---|---|---|
| 1 | 1 | "When Laws Give You Lemons" | June 30, 2021 |
After Ethan and Emily get their lemonade stand taken by Karinne, Gabby uses her time-traveling wheelchair to take the twins to France in 1848 to meet Frédéric Bastiat and learn about natural rights and property rights. They then go to the Old West (specifically, the fictional town of Quiet Valley) where they have to stop two bandits from seizing cows. (which serves as the show's allegory for taxation, which is equated with theft)
| 2 | 2 | "War of the Worms" | October 26, 2021 |
After a confrontation at the science camp, Gabby brings the twins into India to meet Mahatma Gandhi and learn about the cycle of violence.
| 3 | 3 | "Pencils, Pirates & Ice Cream People" | November 9, 2021 |
Gabby takes the twins backwards through time to meet Adam Smith, who teaches them about the invisible hand and uses the manufacturing of pencils as an example to demonstrate the benefits of free trade.
| 4 | 4 | "Of Business & Benjamins" | November 23, 2021 |
Gabby and the twins travel to the year 1770 to meet Benjamin Franklin, who teaches them that the best way to come up with good ideas is to have lots of ideas, even if some of them turn out to be unsuccessful. Afterward, they go to Annie Turnbo Malone to learn about her success.
| 5 | 5 | "Rising Tides & Dirty Deals" | December 14, 2021 |
After the twins have to close their corn dog stand because of an ordinance prohibiting outside food trucks and stands from selling food in parks or within two miles of restaurants, Gabby takes them five years into the past to witness barbecue restauranteur Big Bob having a discussion with then-City Councilman (by their time, Mayor) Jenkins about convincing the city council to pass a law that would require food handlers to pay an annual license fee which would put small vendors at a disadvantage whilst leaving Big Bob with enough money to support Jenkins' mayoral campaign. Soon thereafter, Gabby takes the twins to meet Henry Hazlitt as he is about to appear as a guest on a talk show in which he explains what protectionism is and how it negatively affects small businesses. Later, Gabby and the twins visit Atlantis, where they notice that a company called the Bucket Brigade maintains a monopoly on flood management due to laws preventing "bucketless" companies from doing business in the city, even though the Bucket Brigade's methods are inefficient at removing water. Gabby and the twins meet an inventor named Hester, who they persuade to present her "water moleculizer" to the Atlantean city council, who denies her permission to start her business despite her invention being much more effective against flooding. After returning home, the twins organize a petition to repeal the city's protectionist law.
| 6 | 6 | "The Inflation Monster" | December 21, 2021 |
Gabby takes the twins to meet Milton Friedman, who teaches them about inflation. He accompanies them to ancient Rome, where they learn about coin debasement, then to the Federal Reserve building in 1925, and then to Zimbabwe in 2008 to learn about the hyperinflation crisis the country had experienced at the time.
| 7 | 7 | "Cake, Pies, & Flat Earth Guys" | March 1, 2022 |
When Ethan and Emily get into an argument over whether cake or pies are better, Gabby takes them to Kolkata, India in 1992 to meet Mother Teresa, who teaches them that just because they have different opinions does not mean that they should see each other as enemies.
| 8 | 8 | "Wonky Wages" | April 5, 2022 |
Whilst Mr. Wonky (a parody of Willy Wonka from Charlie and the Chocolate Factory) is giving a tour of his toy factory to Ethan and Emily's class on a field trip, a disgruntled employee angrily quits her job in front of them. With the remaining workers unable to come up with good ideas for future toys, Gabby takes the twins to Yankee Stadium in 1929 to meet Babe Ruth, who tells them about how he is paid more because of the value he brings to his team. Later, she takes the twins to her childhood home in Havana to show them how socialist policies have caused conditions in Cuba to decline.
| 9 | 9 | "Dumpsters & Disobedience" | May 3, 2022 |
Gabby takes the twins to Montgomery, Alabama in 1955, breaks Rosa Parks out of the city jail, and takes her along for a ride backwards through time to Rochester, New York to witness Susan B. Anthony get arrested for voting, then to Cambridge, Maryland in 1851 to see Harriet Tubman helping an escaped slave run from a mob trying to catch them.
| 10 | 10 | "Roll for Power" | September 6, 2022 |
During an economic recession the twin visit Calvin Coolidge to learn about how governments grow during time of crisis.
| 11 | 11 | "Free Speech Freestyle" | October 4, 2022 |
When Karinne says mean, untrue things about Ethan (such as that he hates baby otters), Gabby takes the twins to the year 1811 to meet James Madison, who teaches them about freedom of speech.
| 12 | 12 | "The Fight for the Future" | November 1, 2022 |
After the events of the previous episode, Karinne decides to get her revenge by breaking into the Tuttles' residence and producing evidence to reveal that Gabby is a time traveler, causing Gabby to be apprehended by a government agency called the Freedom and Regulation Team (F.A.R.T. (Note: Pronounced /fɛɹt/)) which attempts to find and confiscate her wheelchair, but the twins and Karinne manage to get it to warp them away before the agents break into the room. Accidentally going to the future, they discover that Gabby was the evil ruler of an empire when she was younger, having built a different time machine to conquer what is presumably the United States. Present day Gabby appears and tells them that seeing them was what made her change for the better, and they leave with Karinne. Gabby shows them a different future, and when they return to present day, Karinne has a change of heart and calls off the Freedom and Regulation Team. The agents find a leak of knowledge juice in the driveway and take a sample with them.

=== Season 2 (2023) ===
| No. overall | No. in season | Title | Original release date |
|---|---|---|---|
| 13 | 1 | "Needs, Rights & Flamingo Fights" | March 7, 2023 |
When students on a field trip attempt to force Lyle to share his food with them on the basis that food is a human right, Gabby takes the twins to East Dorset in 1668 to meet John Locke, who explains the difference between rights and needs. The twins are later transported to and left stranded on an island with flesh-eating flamingos, where they figure out how to cooperate with a boy named Keith.
| 14 | 2 | "Don't Trash Success" | April 4, 2023 |
Gabby takes the twins to Boston in the 1960s to meet Joyce Chen, who teaches them that being a successful entrepreneur is not necessarily a bad thing. They then go to Zero Summit Mountain, a place inhabited by creatures who attempt to obtain fruits called grumquats from higher ground, but they tear each other's ladders down. After one of the creatures explains the situation to Gabby and the twins, he opens a fruit service that involves the other creatures giving him ladder rungs so he can climb up to gather grumquats to sell to them. After he brings the grumquats down, the other creatures use them for various purposes.
| 15 | 3 | "Bitcoin and the Beast" | May 2, 2023 |
Whilst having a yard sale, Ethan and Emily find themselves unable to decide whether to sell their Money Craft gaming system to Karinne for $100 or to Lyle for the same amount in Bitcoin. To help the twins learn about Bitcoin, Gabby takes them into the internet to meet Satoshi Nakamoto, who explains how the quick and easy duplication of currency (wampum beads being an example mentioned) can result in devaluation, how cryptocurrencies are mined, and how blockchains work. After leaving Crypto Corner, Gabby taps a pop-up that sends the twins into Money Craft, where the twins have to collect rubies to fill up their "wealth bars" in order to escape. Karinne gets a hold of the gaming system and uses the Konami code to give herself unlimited rubies, causing the twins' and non-player characters' wealth bars to get depleted. After Gabby introduces a literal Bitcoin mine, Karinne duplicates her Bitcoin and tries to use it, but the blockchain rejects it. The twins fill their wealth bars, leave Money Craft, and sell the gaming system to Lyle.
| 16 | 4 | "Think Outside the Flocks" | June 6, 2023 |
After their softball team starts bending the rules, the twins jump through famous paintings, learn about the dangers of tribalism from George Washington, and try to save a divided farm from a big bad wolf. Guest star: Jarret LeMaster
| 17 | 5 | "A T-Rex and Tangled Ideas" | June 30, 2023 |
After a T-rex destroys their treehouse, the twins struggle to save Rapunzel's cramped kingdom and learn that good ideas can come from imperfect people.
| 18 | 6 | "The Itsy Bitsy Victim Mentality" | August 1, 2023 |
After being called off the stage within just a few seconds of their respective auditions for a citywide talent show, the twins and Karinne learn that all the performers who made the cut are from the West Oaks neighborhood and start complaining at school about how the talent show judges treated them unfairly. They adopt a victim mentality and start blaming the judges for unrelated problems. Gabby takes the twins to Washington D.C. in 1884 to meet Frederick Douglass, who gives the twins anecdotes about how Alexander Hamilton, Helen Keller and Douglass himself overcame unfair circumstances in their own lives.
| 19 | 7 | "Mermaid Tails & Planning Fails" | September 5, 2023 |
When their school district gets involved in the Cookies for Bookies program, which involves using cookies as an incentive for students to read books, Gabby takes the twins to the University of Chicago in 1950 to meet Friedrich Hayek, who is brought along to present-day India to meet an artist named Kali, who helps him explain the cobra effect and the downsides of central planning.
| 20 | 8 | "Spooky, Stinky Subsidies" | October 3, 2023 |
Gabby takes the twins to meet Ludwig von Mises, who demonstrates how subsidies result in a "messed up market" by using an example in which subsidies for umbrella vendors result in unintended consequences for sellers of ponchos. Gabby then takes them to a place called Hallowood (a portmanteau of Halloween and Hollywood) in which subsidies cause onions to replace pumpkins.
| 21 | 9 | "Wrestling With Socialism" | November 7, 2023 |
When the kids raise money for tickets to a lucha libre match, they tried to share the responsibility. Gabby takes the twins to Plymouth Colony in 1626 to meet William Bradford, who shows them the benefits of letting people keep what they make instead of forcing them to share. After that, Karl Marx finds Gabby at the Time Travelers' Resort and Spa, and they go on a socialist-themed water ride that portrays Greece in 2017 and East Berlin in 1982. Frustrated, Marx presses a button on Gabby's wheelchair, "accidentally" transporting them to the actual Berlin Wall. In the end, Gabby takes Marx back on board her wheelchair, and Marx later wakes up stranded on the island from "Needs, Rights & Flamingo Fights".
| 22 | 10 | "The Education Jungle" | November 21, 2023 |
Gabby takes the twins to Princeton, New Jersey in 1934 to meet Albert Einstein, who teaches them that bad grades will not necessarily hinder them for the rest of their lives, that the true sign of intelligence is imagination rather than knowledge, that they can learn on their own outside of school, and that no school system is perfect.
| 23 | 11 | "Kidnappers & Capitalism" | December 5, 2023 |
Derek is kidnapped by alien raccoons who take him back to their planet, but are followed by Gabby and the twins, who learn that Derek is actually one of the aliens and that he was predestined at birth to run against President Rabies. Another raccoon called the Oracle teaches the twins about crony capitalism and government transparency, and the twins go on a mission to infiltrate a meeting between President Rabies and corporate lobbyists. After Derek drinks knowledge juice, temporarily enhancing his intelligence in the process, he exposes President Rabies' corruption during a debate and has the Oracle run against Rabies instead.
| 24 | 12 | "Money Management Mayhem: A Christmas Adventure" | December 12, 2023 |
While shopping online for jackets, Ethan and Emily get into an argument over each other's approach to spending. Gabby has them play a fictional board game called Generic-Manji (a parody of Jumanji) which results in the twins meeting a future version of Ethan who continued to spend impulsively and a future version of Emily who continued trying to keep her spending as low as possible. Derek rolls the dice repeatedly, causing the board to summon wild animals which force the twins to go upstairs, where they meet alternative future versions of the twins who teach them about financial planning and delayed gratification.

=== Season 3 (2024–25) ===
| No. overall | No. in season | Title | Original release date |
|---|---|---|---|
| 25 | 1 | "The College Conundrum" | May 7, 2024 |
After building a robot named Ro-Burt, Ethan and Emily talk with their parents about going to college, and Gabby takes the twins (along with Ro-Burt) to meet Mike Rowe (voiced by himself) who teaches them that they do not have to go to college to get a high-paying job, and that they have to develop special skills to set themselves apart. Gabby and the twins go back into the time continuum and enter a world where drinking water gives people superpowers. Ethan gives a superheroine named Laserina a step-by-step guide on how to "earn [her] signal", leading her to get a welding job in which she uses her heat vision to build a bridge, which gets attacked by a villain named Skelecopter, who is defeated by Derek in his superhero persona.
| 26 | 2 | "Fighting for Fatherhood" | June 4, 2024 |
Gabby takes the twins to meet Ben Carson, who explains the importance of a father figure in a child's life. At one point, Gabby and the twins end up on an island inhabited by lost dads, who are encouraged to be present in their families' lives so that their children are not left fatherless.
| 27 | 3 | "Cracking Conspiracies" | September 3, 2024 |
Gabby takes Ethan and Emily to a wax museum and uses a device on her wheelchair to bring to life the head of a wax figure of John F. Kennedy, who advises the twins to question everything they hear and gives them tips on how to find the truth.
| 28 | 4 | "Evil Queens & Spying Screens" | October 1, 2024 |
Gabby takes the twins to meet an anonymous individual who discusses the right to privacy and how governments and technology companies violate that right by spying on and gathering information about users, and informs the twins of precautionary measures they can take to safeguard their own personal information.
| 29 | 5 | "Bitcoin Bash & Corrupted Cash" | October 17, 2024 |
In an episode sponsored by Swan Bitcoin, the twins go on a shopping spree. When the twins find out how much their grocery costs at the checkout, Emily makes a remark about how they could "fix the money problems" themselves if they could control it. In response, Gabby takes them back to the internet, bringing Ro-Burt along with them, but Karinne tags along with them as well. They land in Bitcoin Beach and meet an anthropomorphic bitcoin named Bitty, who sings a song about how "money is corrupted" when it is controlled and tells them about CBDCs. In spite of Bitty's lectures, Karinne continues to dismiss bitcoin as a "pet rock", to which Gabby responds by transporting the group to Karinne's uncle Jamie's rock collection, where they introduce the concept of money to the sentient rocks, leading to disastrous results when Pebbles (one of the rocks) uses a pair of scissors to produce more money, opens a "Federal Rockserve", and uses the money to "buy the Irock War".
| 30 | 6 | "Soccer Fights & Religious Rights" | December 3, 2024 |
When the twins' best soccer player is unable to participate in a game because of a religious holiday, Karinne gets frustrated and threatens to kick him off the team. Gabby introduces the twins to Adassa (voiced by herself) who sings them a song advocating for freedom of religion.
| 31 | 7 | "Close Encounters of the Judgy Kind" | January 7, 2025 |
When Ethan's school dodgeball team loses a match because a student named Aaron picked students to be team members based on appearance rather than ability, Gabby takes the twins to meet Martin Luther King Jr., who teaches them the importance of judging people by the content of their character instead.
| 32 | 8 | "Meatball Smears & War Profiteers" | February 4, 2025 |
As yet another, more intense food fight breaks out in the cafeteria at Ethan and Emily's school, Gabby takes the twins to meet Dwight D. Eisenhower and learn about the military-industrial complex. Upon their return, they find out that food suppliers Rey Theon and Martin Lockheed are incentivizing Karinne to start and continue food fights so they can sell more food and use the revenue to support Karinne's campaign for class president.
| 33 | 9 | "Flying Through Failure" | February 4, 2025 |
Gabby and the twins travel through time to witness the Wright brothers make several failed attempts to fly their airplane before their first successful flight in Kitty Hawk.
| 34 | 10 | "Ruins and Responsibility" | March 5, 2025 |
Sep transforms into a monster and sends the twins to a ruined alternate world, where they uncover the dangers of irresponsibility. With help from their not-grandmother, they inspire change and prove that true freedom comes from taking responsibility.

=== Season 4 (2025–2026) ===
| No. overall | No. in season | Title | Original release date |
|---|---|---|---|
| 35 | 1 | "The Rollercoaster of Charity" | November 4, 2025 |
The twins earn a trip to Bird Land Amusement Park and discover that some charities do more harm than good. With help from friends, they learn to give better to prevent the park from shutting down forever.
| 36 | 2 | "Melting Money & Fancy Fridges" | December 2, 2025 |
When the Tuttle family debates buying a fancy new fridge, Gabby takes the twins to meet John Maynard Keynes, who advocates for short-term thinking, and Saifedean Ammous, who advocates for long-term thinking instead. After Keynes' boat burns and capsizes, he unwittingly presses the "Food Me" button on Gabby's scooter, causing the twins to be transported into the Tuttles' current fridge, where sentient food items use ice cubes that have to be spent before they melt away. After unsuccessfully confronting the Federal Freezerve about his ice cube production, the twins later get the idea to use fruitcake as an alternative, hard-to-get currency that would not diminish in value like ice cubes.
| 37 | 3 | "Cars, Cafes & Creative Destruction" | January 6, 2026 |
After a chaotic day at the Tuttles' family-owned cafe, Ethan and Emily's parents consider getting a new machine that can make coffee, create latte art, and restock napkins. The twins disagree with this proposal out of fear that it may threaten their jobs, and Gabby takes them to meet Henry Ford, who talks to them about creative destruction and discusses the pros and cons of innovations, particularly automobiles. As Gabby and the twins fly through the timestream, a masked, hooded figure appears and fires an energy projectile at them. Gabby successfully steers her wheelchair to dodge the projectile, but she and the twins fly out of the timestream and end up in a parallel dimension where horse-drawn carriages remain in use, inventions such as printing presses, telephones and flush toilets are eschewed by their community, and doctors still use leeches to draw blood and balance the humors. When the twins return home, they and their parents discuss the benefits of having the new coffee machine in their cafe.
| 38 | 4 | "Elves & Equity" | February 3, 2026 |
After Emily unfairly loses a pie bake-off, the twins turn to Thomas Sowell to learn the dangers of equity and are swept into a fantastical world of elves, orcs, and basketball.
| 39 | 5 | "Playing with Price Controls" | March 5, 2026 |
After a price hike puts a new board game out of reach, the twins travel to Russia to learn about price controls. With economist Ludwig von Mises and a very persistent Copernicus, they discover why controlling prices can backfire.
| 40 | 6 | "Hunger Pains & Media Games" | April 7, 2026 |
After a suspicious news story airs, Gabby and the twins rescue Benjamin Franklin Bache, but become trapped in a world where speaking out leads to deadly consequences. They must use journalism and the power of truth to fight back and survive.
| 41 | 7 | "Food Lies & Battle Cries" | May 5, 2026 |
When the Tuttles enter a fitness competition sponsored by a questionable food company called Nepsi-Co, their health quickly declines. In their search for answers about nutrition, they have a fever dream in which they meet an anthropomorphic food pyramid that tells them about tactics used by producers of ultraprocessed food and their similarity to tactics historically used by the tobacco industry.
| 42 | 8 | "Dinos & Dependency" | June 2, 2026 |
When the local library faces closure, Grandma takes the twins to learn from Alexis de Tocqueville about the strength of community. But after a time tunnel mishap turns them into dinosaurs, survival depends on teamwork.
| 43 | 9 | "Dark Dumpster Derek and the Gold Grabbers" | July 6, 2026 |
Ethan and Emily are pulled into George Washington’s painting—and a Dark Dumpster Derek movie inside their own imagination—to stop a group of villains from stealing gold before it disappears for good. Sponsored by Goldbacks.
| 44 | 10 | "The Safety Sacrifice" | August 4, 2026 |
While Ethan and Emily are trying out their own time-traveling vehicles alongside Gabby, they are chased by a masked individual. After Gabby crashes into a rock, the individual (named Dr. Safety) puts her on a hospital bed and takes her and the twins to Planet Safety, where he lectures them about how their promotion of freedom across multiple dimensions in prior episodes has put their respective inhabitants at increased risk of experiencing issues like crime, unemployment, and hate speech, which would scare people into supporting policies that are supposed to keep them safe, but at the cost of their freedom. With the twins feeling bad about what had been happening in those dimensions after their visits, Gabby points out that Dr. Safety had not told them the whole story. Dr. Safety plans to use a powerful time bomb to destroy the time stream, but the Tuttles take it with the help of the twins' mother (after it is revealed that Gabby secretly modified the Tuttles' family car to be a time machine) and Dr. Safety chases them through various dimensions, including Flamingo Island, where he loses his equipment and has to ride with the Tuttles in their car. After they all exit the time stream, and with seconds left before the bomb detonates, Roburt flies away with it and returns in one piece, revealing that he had taken Dr. Safety's bulletproof cape to save himself from the blast. Dr. Safety is taken to Planet TSA and left there.

=== Specials ===
| No. | Title | Original release date |
|---|---|---|
| 1 | "Dark Dumpster Derek Returns!" | November 15, 2023 |
In an episode sponsored by Goldback, Gabby interrupts the shooting of a movie featuring Derek in his Dark Dumpster Derek persona to chastise Emily for coming up with the line "gold is garbage money" and takes her and Ethan into paintings to meet George Washington, who teaches them about the gold standard.
| 2 | "Cabrini: A Tuttle Twins Adventure" | March 8, 2024 |
When the twins learn that they have to spend their Saturday running a soup kitchen at the family café, Gabby takes them to Five Points, Manhattan in 1895 to meet Frances Xavier Cabrini, who takes them into the sewers to help her rescue a child.
| 3 | "Solving Selfishness: A Copernicus & Karinne Adventure" | July 2, 2024 |
After complaining about others being selfish and inconsiderate of what she wants, Karinne is taken backwards through time to meet her idol Karl Marx, but first she meets Adam Smith, and Annie Turnbo Malone who explains the idea of self interest.
| 4 | "Young Washington: A Tuttle Twins Adventure" | August 6, 2024 |
When Ethan and Emily's new movie falls apart, Gabby intervenes and takes them on a journey to learn about resilience from President George Washington. Note: Nick Freitas guest stars in this episode.
| 5 | "Helmuth Hübener: A Short" | November 5, 2024 |
When their gym teacher instructs his class to steal the other team's mascot, Gabby takes the twins to Hamburg, Germany in 1945 to learn about Helmuth Hübener and how he spoke out against the Nazi regime in Germany.
| 7 | "Homestead: A Tuttle Twins Adventure" | December 10, 2024 |
When a thunderstorm causes the Tuttles to experience a power outage whilst attempting to stream the film Homestead, Gabby reluctantly plugs her wheelchair in for backup power, unwittingly causing her and the twins to get transported into the movie, in which they meet Jeff Eriksson, who teaches the twins about emergency preparedness.
| 8 | "Tax Day Holiday Special: Tuttle Tuesday" | March 31, 2025 |
At the end of their shift at their parents' family-owned cafe, Tuttle's Food for Thought, the twins' father gives them money and then takes some of it back. After expressing their frustration at being taxed, Gabby drags them into the cafe's TV set and into the world of Schoolhouse Pop, where they meet an anthropomorphic dollar bill who has pieces of himself cut and torn from him by an Uncle Sam-like figure, representing portions of their future yearly paychecks being taken by the government via taxes.
| 9 | "Tuttle Tuesday: The Cost of Cuckoo Laws" | July 1, 2025 |
After someone at the cafe suggests that there should be a law against loud cuckoo clocks, Ethan and Emily are accidentally transported into the world of their own tabletop roleplaying game and meet an anthropomorphic donkey named Henry David Burro, who tells them about how strict laws can make life harder for people who are prosecuted for violating them.
| 10 | "Tuttle Tuesday: Fairies & Figuring It Out" | August 5, 2025 |
When Ethan is assigned to make a life-size Pinocchio puppet for a school play, Gabby transports him into his Pinocchio book in which he meets Jimothy Wishit, who suggests that he makes a wish upon the moon, and the Do Fairy, who encourages him to take initiative on his project.

== Broadcast ==
New episodes are typically premiered via livestream on YouTube and then released on the Angel Studios app and website.

=== Use in Argentina ===
In May 2025, the administration of Argentine President Javier Milei announced that the first two seasons of Tuttle Twins would air on Pakapaka, the county's state-run children's television network, for a reported sum of $8,000. The government described the move as part of an effort to teach the country's youth about free market principles.

This was one of the first instances of the series being adopted as part of a country's national public media. However, as of July 2025, there are no traces of the show on Pakapaka's programming schedule.
