= Libertas Institute =

Libertas Institute may refer to:

- Libertas Institute (Utah)
- Libertas Institute (Ireland)
