= His Only Son =

2023 film

- Theatrical release poster
- Directed by: David Helling
- Written by: David Helling
- Based on: The Bible
- Produced by: David Helling; Roman Medjanov; Mike Kaney II
- Starring: Nicolas Mouawad; Sara Seyed; Ottavio Taddei; Nicolai Perez; Edaan Moskowitz; Daniel da Silva
- Cinematography: Nick Walker
- Edited by: David Helling
- Music by: Jordain Wallace
- Production company: RockBridge Productions
- Distributed by: Angel Studios
- Release date: March 31, 2023
- Running time: 101 minutes
- Country: United States
- Language: English
- Budget: $250,000
- Box office: $13.8 million

His Only Son is a 2023 American Abrahamic historical drama film produced, edited, written and directed by David Helling. Primarily set in Canaan, the film centers on the account from Genesis 22 in the Old Testament when the Lord tells Abraham to sacrifice his only son, Isaac, on Mount Moriah. The film stars Nicolas Mouawad as Abraham, Sara Seyed as Sarah, Edaan Moskowitz as Isaac, and Daniel da Silva as the Lord, alongside Ottavio Taddei and Nicolai Perez. It was released in the United States on March 31, 2023.

== Plot ==
In 2,000 BC, in Canaan, the Lord calls Abraham to sacrifice his only son, Isaac, as a burnt offering on the mountain of Moriah. Bidding goodbye to his wife Sarah, Abraham takes two of his servants, Kelzar, the son of the chief servant Eliezer of Damascus, and Eshcolam, a Pelishtiy, with him and Isaac. Forty years earlier, in 2,040 BC, Abraham–then as Abram–tells his wife Sarah–then as Sarai–that he sees the Lord God, who instructs him to go to a land the Lord God will show him and promises to make of him a great nation, leaving his home, Ur Kasdim.

In the present, on the road to Hebron, the group encounters several Pelishtiy guards of Abimelech, king of Pelesheth. The Pelishtiys leave the group alone after Abraham reveals himself as Abram, who is acquainted with King Abimelech. At camp, Abraham tells the event of how he leads his shepherds to defeat the kings from Shinar in the east, saving Sodomite captives which include Abraham's family. Abraham also discusses the destruction of Sodom and Gomorrah due to wickedness with the group.

Throughout the journey, Abraham recalls the Lord's promise of land and descendants and how Sarai advises Abram to go to Egypt during a famine. Approaching Hebron, Abraham remembers the Lord's covenant with him of a son as an heir. Abraham reminisces how he tells Sarai the Lord's covenant with him, leading to Abram sleeping with Sarai's Egyptian maid, Hagar, to bear children at Sarai's request and Hagar being pregnant then giving birth to Ishmael, Abram's firstborn son, at Hebron, creating contention between Abram, Sarai, and Hagar.

At night, after talking over the symbol of sacrifices; the holiness of God; being blind to sin; faith; his experience of God; the penalty of death; and God's mind, ways, thoughts, and purpose with the group, Abraham bargains with the Lord to take his life, not Isaac's. Entering Ephrathah, Abraham recounts the Pelishtiys taking Sarah into the harem of King Abimelech and how the Lord plagues both the house and the people of Abimelech, thus giving back Sarah to Abraham and repaying with wealth and servants. Following Eshcolam's animosity towards Abraham and Kelzar's intervention, the group confronts the Pelishtiy guards again, who ask for tithes and then leave them, injuring both Abraham and Isaac. On the ground, Abraham reminisces about meeting with three visitors and the Lord renaming Abram to Abraham and Sarai to Sarah, promising him a child named Isaac.

Arriving at Moriah, Abraham takes Isaac with him to the mountain. Isaac asks Abraham where the lamb is, to which Abraham responds of the Lord God's provision. Looking back to Sarah's pregnancy to Isaac and Isaac's birth, Abraham reveals to Isaac that Isaac is the sacrifice. Isaac reluctantly complies with Abraham, and Abraham binds Isaac. As Abraham is about to sacrifice Isaac, the Lord tells Abraham to spare Isaac, and Abraham sees a ram as a substitute for sacrifice. Abraham then declares the Lord will provide. The Lord repeats his promise to Abraham as Abraham has not withheld Isaac from the Lord.

2,000 years later, in 30 AD, the Roman centurion at the cross acknowledges the crucified Jesus as the Son of God.

== Cast ==
- Nicolas Mouawad as Abraham / Abram: A righteous man from the Kasdim, who is the husband of Sarah and the father of Isaac.
- Sara Seyed as Sarah / Sarai: The wife of Abraham and the mother of Isaac.
- Ottavio Taddei as Kelzar: The son of Eliezer of Damascus, a servant of Abraham, and a friend of Isaac.
- Nicolai Perez as Eshcolam: A hostile Pelishtiy servant of Abraham.
- Edaan Moskowitz as Isaac: The only son of Abraham and Sarah.
- Daniel da Silva as The Lord: The God of Abraham and his household.

== Production ==
His Only Son is the debut film from writer/director David Helling, a former United States Marine. The film was made in 2019 and took five years to make. The movie was filmed entirely outside on set in California.

== Release ==
The film's producers partnered with Angel Studios for distribution and crowdfunded over $1.23 million for its March 2023 theatrical release. It is the first nationwide theatrical release to ever be crowdfunded. His Only Son was released in theaters on March 31, 2023, and will subsequently be made available for streaming on Angel Studios.

== Reception ==
=== Box office ===
His Only Son has grossed $12.3 million in the United States and Canada and $1.4 million in other territories, for a worldwide total of $13.8 million

Released alongside A Thousand and One, Dungeons & Dragons: Honor Among Thieves, and the wide expansion of A Good Person, the film made $2.2 million on its first day and went to debut on $5.5 million from 1,920 theaters in its opening weekend, finishing in third.

=== Critical response ===
On the review aggregator website Rotten Tomatoes, the film has an approval rating of 83% based on 12 reviews, with an average rating of 5.7/10. Audiences surveyed by CinemaScore gave the film an average grade of "A" on an A+ to F scale, while those polled by PostTrak gave it a 93% positive score, with 83% saying they would definitely recommend it.

Collin Garbarino of WORLD gave the film a score of 3/5, saying, "Despite the movie's limitations, the journey with Abraham might be worth taking." Jackie K. Cooper gave the film a rating of 6/10, saying that it was, "A good presentation of the Abraham/Isaac bible story, perfectly timed for the Easter crowd." Carla Hay of Culture Mix rated the film "fresh" and called it a "worthy, low-budget drama. "The depiction of Abraham's troubled marriage gives this reverent movie some grit." Hay wrote.

Roger Moore of Movie Nation was highly critical of the film, giving it 1.5/4 and saying, "There's a reason others have filmed the Abraham/Isaac story, but always left it as merely a chapter in the larger narrative of 'The Bible…In the Beginning' or 'The Greatest Story Ever Told.' It's just a vivid but short anecdote, not material for an epic."

=== Criticism ===
Tubagus Ace Hasan Syadzily, a member of the Indonesian House of Representatives, requested that the film be banned in Indonesia because the plot did not match the story of Ibrahim in Islam, despite the storyline being based on the Bible.
