= List of Jungle Beat episodes =

The following is an episode list for Sunrise Productions' children's comedy series, Jungle Beat, in chronological order.

== Episodes ==
=== Season 1 (2003) ===
Episode Number	Title	Directed by	Written by	Episode Summary	Original Air Date
1	Always Take the Weather with You	Brent Dawes	Brent Dawes	Monkey wakes up as he has every other morning, although this morning is not like every other morning. Snow blankets the landscape, something monkey has never seen before.	22 Oct. 2004
2	You Give Me Fever	Brent Dawes	Brent Dawes	For Bee, collecting pollen when you happen to be allergic to it is not the easiest task in the world. But try he does, and sneeze he does, often.	2003
3	I Want to Break Free	Brent Dawes	Brent Dawes	Tortoise has been lugging his shell around for a long time now, his whole life in fact, and he resents this clumsy heavy thing, so he breaks free. But when an eagle soars overhead, the race is on for Tortoise to get back in his shell.	22 Apr. 2006
4	Because I Got High	Brent Dawes	Brent Dawes	Giraffe becomes unsure that being high up is the safest thing for him and eventually decides it would be better if he were to come down to earth and stay there, moving along caterpillar-like with dexterous movements of his neck. This is fine for a while until those juiciest fruits on the tops of the tallest trees start to become irresistible!	2007
5	Born to Be Wild	Brent Dawes	Brent Dawes	As timing would have it, all of Mother Ostrich's eggs decide now is the time to break free, and she has a rather hair-raising time trying to contain her four escapees.	2007
6	Stuck on You	Brent Dawes	Brent Dawes	In the process of trying to shake the leaf embedded on his spikes, Hedgehog ends up rolling over a whole lot more leaves and looking suspiciously like a bush.	2007
7	Shout, Shout, Let It All Out	Brent Dawes	Brent Dawes	Frog's croak decides to hop it and leave him speechless, literally. After sampling a number of other voices, Frog decides this is not fun, so tries to catch up with his runaway croak.	2006
8	And So the Feeling Grows	Brent Dawes	Brent Dawes	Ant stumbles across a strange liquid, drinks it, and shrinks. He finds his way to a different liquid, drinks it and grows. He hiccups and shrinks again, he hiccups and grows again, oh, what a predicament.	2006
9	Moondance	Brent Dawes	Brent Dawes	Giraffe is happily enjoying his night time stroll when he bumps his head on the moon and knocks it from the sky. In the clumsy process of trying to fix it, he creates more stars through a magical fusion of moonlight and dandelion seeds.	2005
10	Yes We Have No Bananas	Brent Dawes	Brent Dawes	Bananas are any monkey's delight. But not all monkeys would go to the lengths that our monkey does when a chasm separates him from his favourite food. Oh, what's a hungry monkey to do?	2007
11	I've Looked at Clouds from Both Sides	Brent Dawes	Brent Dawes	"All work and no play" is a phrase that definitely does not apply to our bee! He uses a petal of his flower as a springboard and has a ball leaping high into the air... too high as he finds himself embedded in a cloud above where he discovers what clouds are really made of and gets further distracted from his work!	2006
12	I've Got You Under My Skin	Brent Dawes	Brent Dawes	Tortoise walks along casually, when a dandelion seed gets blown into his shell. This is a rather distressing thing to happen to tortoise as scratching within his shell is not the easiest thing in the world for him to do.	2006
13	Love Is in the Air	Brent Dawes	Brent Dawes	As Monkey sleeps his tail is alert, has a look around, spots a vine hanging in a tree a little way off and instantly falls in love with it. Tail proceeds to drag Monkey around as it tries to reach the vine.	2006

=== Season 2 (2009) ===
Episode Number	Title	Directed by	Written by	Episode Summary	Original Air Date
1	Because You're Gorgeous	Brent Dawes	Brent Dawes	Warthog is proud of his lion-like head of hair. He struts proudly around until one lock of hair springs out of place. Warthog does all he can to regain his pristine looks, but the more he tries the worse it gets.	Aug. 2008
2	I Believe I Can Fly	Wayne Thornley	Wayne Thornley and Alex Latimer	Nobody told Baby Ostrich that ostriches can't fly and even if they did, she wouldn't let that little technicality get in her way. She's going to soar with the eagles if it's the last thing she does!	2009
3	You Don't Bring Me Flowers	Brent Dawes	Brent Dawes	Springbok is out on his morning bounce when suddenly something catches his attention. It is a female springbok. After an embarrassing collision with a rock face Springbok notices a beautiful flower up above. He decides to try and win the female springbok's affections by getting her the flower, but this turns out to be a lot more perilous than he could've imagined!	2009
4	Blowin' in the Wind	Brent Dawes	Brent Dawes	Ant is tasked with taking a leaf back to his anthill. This seems simple enough until nature conspires to make it a task of Herculean proportions.	Jan. 2011
5	I Love Rock and Roll	Brent Dawes	Brent Dawes	The day Springbok discovers his echo turns out to be a lot more eventful that one would imagine.	Dec. 2009
6	If at First You Don't Succeed	Brent Dawes	Brent Dawes	Elephant is happily eating his morning helping of seeds. Happy, that is, until he spots a much bigger meal in a tree high overhead. He will do anything to get to the enticing fruit, even change the evolution of trees.	1 Nov. 2011
7	This Little Light of Mine	Brent Dawes	Brent Dawes	Firefly has had a long, hard day and as the sun sets, he heads home for a sleep. The trouble is his light keeps shining in his eyes so he can't fall asleep. After much trying Firefly finally manages to put his light out. Unfortunately, it's only now that Firefly realizes he's scared of the dark. How's he going to get his light back on again?	2011
8	Somewhere Over the Rainbow	Brent Dawes	Brent Dawes	Chameleon is very proud of his pristine white complexion. When he steps into a puddle of mud he does all he can to get clean again only to end up further and further from white. Finally, he manages to clean up only to realize he enjoyed having a bit of colour, so how's he going to get it back?	2012
9	Bent	Brent Dawes	Brent Dawes	Giraffe has a stiff neck. This is a particularly large concern for Giraffe as he is mostly neck as it is. He tries everything to get his neck back to normal, but things get a lot worse before they get better.	Jul. 2011
10	I'm Like a Bird	Brent Dawes	Brent Dawes	Tortoise's day takes a serious turn for the weird when his shell gets a puncture and deflates. Not only that but in his attempts to get out of his limp shell he knocks an egg out of its nest. His attention turns to helping the egg return home during which his deflated shell proves surprising useful.	2011
11	Down by the Riverside	Brent Dawes	Brent Dawes	All frog wants to do is go for a nice cool swim in his stream, but for some reason he cannot seem to get into the water. From sap sticking to his feet to errant lily pads, everything seems to be conspiring to keep him dry. That is until...	2012
12	I've Got a Lovely Bunch of Coconuts	Brent Dawes	Brent Dawes	Monkey has found a coconut which he is very eager to eat. This turns out to be harder than he anticipated. Try as he might he just cannot get it open until...	2012
13	Better Be Home Soon	Brent Dawes	Brent Dawes	Bee is bored. Bored, bored, bored. The swarm are looking for a new place to set up their hive and it's turning out to be quite a long journey. Bee tries to keep himself amused, but only manages to annoy the rest of the swarm.	2012

=== Season 3 (2014) ===
Episode Number	Title	Directed by	Written by	Episode Summary	Original Air Date
1	Tiny Bubbles	Brent Dawes	Brent Dawes	Fish is delighted by her discovery of a bubble. She plays with it and swims with it all the way to the surface where it suddenly pops and disappears. She spots another bubble and the same thing happens. Saddened by the disappearance of her short-lived friends, she's deter-mined not to let another bubble meet the same fate. But how will she keep them from reaching the surface?	Example
2	Can't Touch This	Brent Dawes	Brent Dawes	Octopus spots a tasty clam on a ledge in the ocean. Being a sneaky character, he does his best to approach the clam unnoticed. This turns out to be much more challenging than Octopus expected as his tentacles and other things conspire to prevent him getting to the clam.	1 Apr. 2014
3	Crush	Brent Dawes	Brent Dawes	Elephant is walking along one day when he accidentally stands on a flower. Elephant is distraught that he has squashed this poor innocent thing. He does all he can to revive the flower, but things get worse before they get better.	12 May 2014
4	There's No Place Like Home	Brent Dawes	Brent Dawes	Hermit crab loses his shell, and being out in the open exposed and vulnerable is terrifying for him. He does all he can to keep himself hidden as he searches, but discovers that even seaweed can be scary when you're scared of everything,	1 Jun. 2014
5	Thunderstruck	Brent Dawes	Brent Dawes	Giraffe is a bit skittish at the best of times. But when a lightning storm starts overhead, and he's the tallest thing around, his "skittishness" hits a whole new level.	1 Jul. 2014
6	Another Brick in the Wall	Brent Dawes	Brent Dawes	Bee is tasked with building a honey comb. All the other bees have finished, but he hasn't started. He gets left on his own to finish the job. If only he'd paid attention when shown how to do it!	1 Aug. 2014
7	Footloose	Brent Dawes	Brent Dawes	Crane is tired from a long flight and swoops down to land and have a rest. Landing this time is harder than it seems. And try as she might, Crane just can't seem to get a clean touch down.	1 Sep. 2014
8	Can't Fight This Feeling	Brent Dawes	Brent Dawes	Penguin wakes up hungry on his large iceberg. He spots some fish in the open waters, but treacherous waves crash into the iceberg below. Penguin is too afraid to jump into the water. But he's still hungry, so what's he to do?	1 Oct. 2014
9	Lifted	Brent Dawes	Brent Dawes	A fruit seed takes root and magically grows while Monkey is asleep. Caught atop the growing plant, Monkey is lifted to the clouds where he awakens to a giant jungle world. His initial shock is quickly forgotten as he spots some giant bananas. This must be paradise! But getting to those bananas isn't easy for a monkey the size of a bug.	1 Jul. 2015
10	Runaway	Brent Dawes	Brent Dawes	When Rhino bends down to drink from a puddle, his horn bumps on a rock and stops his head from going down any further. This is the start of a rather infuriating afternoon of battling to just get that water!	1 Aug. 2015
11	Wake Me Up	Brent Dawes	Brent Dawes	Polar Bear is waking up from a long winter sleep. Or rather, he's trying to wake up. No matter what he does, he keeps falling asleep again, often at the most unfortunate times.	1 Sep. 2015
12	Deeper Underground	Brent Dawes	Brent Dawes	Hedgehog has dug himself a lovely burrow. Lovely, apart from the fact that he's made it too deep and he can't climb out. He makes an escape tunnel, but that only takes him further and further from home. More Stickers.	1 Oct. 2015
13	The Winner Takes All	Sam Wilson	Sam Wilson	A highly competitive Dolphin finds himself being beaten in a race by an inanimate urchin shell. He can't let himself be defeated, so he sets up race after race against the shell, and loses every time.	1 Nov. 2015

=== Season 4 (2025) ===
Episode Number	Title	Directed by	Written by	Episode Summary	Original Air Date
1	On Like a Roar!	Brent Dawes	Brent Dawes	Lion	
