= Jungle beat =

Jungle beat may refer to:

- Donkey Kong Jungle Beat, a 2004 video game
- Oldschool jungle, a music genre
- A pejorative name for rock and roll
- Jungle Beat (TV series), an animated children's television show
- Jungle Beat: The Movie, a 2020 animated film
