= Born to Be Mild =

Born to Be Mild may refer to:

- Born to Be Mild (album), an album of the band Snog
- "Born to Be Mild", an episode of the TV show Family Matters
- "Born to Be Mild", 2 episodes of the TV show Kirby: Right Back at Ya!
- "Born to Be Mild", an episode of the TV show Squirrel Boy
- "Born to Be Mild", an episode of the TV show Thirtysomething

== Other uses ==
- Man, the Myth, the Tax Bill (a.k.a. Born to Be Mild), a first leg of Robbie Williams North American Tours

== See also ==
- Born to Be Wild (disambiguation)
