= Jungle Beat: The Movie =

- Film poster
- Directed by: Brent Dawes
- Written by: Brent Dawes
- Screenplay by: Brent Dawes; Sam Wilson
- Based on: Jungle Beat by Brent Dawes
- Produced by: Phil Cunningham; Jacqui Cunningham; Tim Keller; Rita Mbanga
- Starring: Ed Kear; David Menkin; Ina Marie Smith; John Guerrasio; David Rintoul; Lucy Montgomery; Claire Johnston; Jason Pennycooke; Gavin Peters; Florrie Wilkinson; Adam Neill; Robert G. Slade; Emma Lungiswa de Wet; Matthew Gair
- Cinematography: Charl James Collocott
- Edited by: Ryno Ritter; Clea Mallinson
- Music by: Andries Smit
- Production companies: Sunrise Productions; Sandcastle Studios
- Distributed by: Timeless Films; Netflix
- Release dates: 15 June 2020 (Annecy); 14 May 2021 (Netflix)
- Running time: 87 minutes
- Countries: Mauritius; South Africa
- Language: English

Jungle Beat: The Movie is a 2020 animated science fiction comedy film directed by Brent Dawes, based on the characters of the television series Jungle Beat. It tells the story of a homesick alien who crash-lands his spaceship near the colorful African Jungle. His new animal friends need to get him back to his ship and teach him about friendship and fun before his Space-Conqueror father can take over the planet.

A co-production between Mauritius and South Africa, the film premiered at the 2020 Annecy International Animation Film Festival and was released by Netflix on 14 May 2021. A sequel, Jungle Beat 2: The Past was released in 2025.

== Plot ==
A group of animals lived in a jungle isolated in the African plains, including Munki the monkey, elephant Trunk, rhino Rocky, giraffe Tallbert, hedgehog Humph, frog Ribbert, a mother ostrich, her three unhatched chicks that always try to escape, and Ray the firefly. One morning, Munki and Trunk wake up to discover that they can speak, which they take advantage of. They learn that the source of their speech is a jello-like, four-legged alien from the planet Scaldron named Fneep, who plans to conquer Earth and has brought some technology with him, including a speech pod translator that helps animals talk. As Munki tries the pods, the animals make him give in, allowing themselves to surrender peacefully, making Fneep's conquest a success. They learn from Fneep that his ship crashed near the mountains, and he can use the homing beacon in his ship to summon the Scaldronians to Earth. Munki, Trunk, Rocky, and Humph agree to come with him to Fneep's ship.

Crossing the plains, they meet a group of singing blue wildebeest, whose leader misbelieves that Fneep may become the new leader for conquering Earth and tries to keep his position, but Fneep tells him that the herd are great at what they do and only follow him out of admiration. Resolved, the leader allows them to pass. One of the ostrich eggs tries to follow them and is almost run over by the wildebeest stampede, hatching in the process. Once out of the egg, the chick believes she can fly and fails to do so. Witnessing the mother ostrich hugging the chick, Fneep learns that hugs are to make someone feel better and special. They learn from Fneep that the only way for Scaldronians to feel special is to conquer planets, proving their strength, and that he's a terrible conqueror due to not conquering any planets until now. Munki, Trunk, and Rocky tell that it does not matter, but he refuses.

Meanwhile, Humph finds Fneep's ship and accidentally jumpstarts it by digging a hole in the hull and touching the exposed wire with his tongue after being lured by the spark's bright light, electrocuting him and elongating his spikes. He learns from a hologram of Fneep's father, Captain Grogon, that Fneep's next step in conquering Earth is to capture all the Earth creatures and imprison them in the Scaldronian museum, the Great Hall of Conquest, setting off to rejoin and warn the others. Later that night, Fneep goes back to the ship himself and reads the Planet Conquering Manual, learning to activate the homing beacon and summon Grogon's ship to his area.

Despite Humph's pleas and the fact that they left the translator's range, preventing them from understanding him, the animals eventually reach Fneep's impact site. Grogon greets them, learning that Fneep lied about conquering Earth. Grogon takes advantage of this to get his 1000th victory, but he stops him by lying that the animals are invincible and unstoppable. Fneep is forced to leave Earth and conquer another planet instead, but Munki, Trunk, Rocky, and Humph sneak aboard on one of the transporters to remind Fneep that he still actually conquered the planet, but they learn from Grogon that the only way to show that the planet is conquered is through a constellation-creating device, which Munki stops him from using as Trunk, who fell with Fneep's star after blasting a hole in the ship with Grogon's gun, assigns the ostrich chick to get the star on board by manually using her trunk to fly.

After a long battle, Grogon defeats the animals, restraining Fneep before firing his star into the sky. Fneep proclaims that though his star is in the sky, he has not conquered the animals due to their "secret weapon", hugs, which he uses to confront his father, making them both turn orange in joy. They try to do this to the other Scaldronians, which results in the ship nearly crashing, but the ostrich chick takes control and saves everyone. The other Scaldronians are all affected by the hugs, and Grogon rescinds occupation of earth, allowing Fneep to claim it. Grogon and Fneep plan to hug every Scaldronian and repay the group by rewarding them the speech pods, gadgets, and also bananas for Munki.

In post-credits scenes, Grogon discovers that Ribbert has eaten his gun after eating Fneep's; Tallbert is seen talking in the Shona language with Trunk and the mother ostrich's speech pod, and Munki, in a protective suit of vines, finally manages to give Humph a hug.

== Voice cast ==
- David Menkin as Munki (speaking and vocal effects), a shy, naive and good-hearted vervet monkey, and main protagonist, and as Rocky, a playful Southern white rhinoceros.
- Ina Marie Smith as Trunk, a female African bush elephant.
- Ed Kear as Fneep, a Scaldronian who lands in the jungle after accidentally crashing his spacecraft.
- Gavin Peter as Tallbert, a reticulated giraffe.
- Adam Neill as the vocal effects of Ribbert, a tree frog, who likes to eat objects, including Scaldronian weapons.
- John Guerrasio as Humph (speaking and vocal effects), a hedgehog.
- David Rintoul as Grogon, the captain of the Scaldronian empire, Fneep's father, and main antagonist.
- Emma Lungiswa De Vet as the vocal effects of Ray, a firefly.
- Mattew Gair, Jason Pennycooke, Lynton Levengood and Claire Johnston as Wildebeests.
- Florrie Wilkinson as Baby Ostrich, a hatchling who dreams of flying.
- Lucy Montgomery as Mama Ostrich (speaking and vocal effects), a pink ostrich.
- Brent Dawes as hugging Scaldronian.
- Ryno Ritter as Scaldronian crowd member.

== Production ==
Director Brant Dawes founded Sandcastle Studios in September 2017, during his trip to Forbach, a village located near the Circle Square Retail Park of the Indian Ocean island of Mauritius. As their first feature film, the studio partnered with Sunrise Studios. Production started in April 2018 and finished in March 2020, creating the first Mauritian-South African animated film.

Dawes stated: "I wrote and made this movie so that anyone who watches it will enjoy it. It was important to me that as a father of four, I always try to find a movie that we can all watch. I’ve got a range of ages too, 5 to 15 years old, so finding a movie we can all watch, where a 5-year-old isn't too scared and the 15-year-old isn't bored, is tricky. This movie is definitely for a broad audience."

The film was animated using Autodesk Maya and rendered on Houdini's render farm GPU Mantra to create realistic hair on the animals and the aliens' "Glitter"-like slimy skin. Each animator used render farm machines with 96GB RAM-equipped Dell computers connected by Houdini grooming tools. For example, all the scenes set in the Scaldronian mothership provide thousands of moving complex effect sources, each reflecting back and forth off the background, the ship's lights and the characters' shadows. Each scene of the film took around 4 hours to be rendered and composed.

While most of the modelling, texture, animation and lighting was created in Mauritius, The film was also produced in South Africa, with voices recorded in London, England, at Soho Square Studios and sound design, foley and final mix done in South Africa at Sunrise Productions in-house studios. Additional animation was provided by Infinite Studios.
