= Space Chickens in Space =

Science fiction-comedy animated television series

- Series posters
- Genre: Science fiction; Surreal comedy
- Created by: José C. García de Letona; Rita Street
- Developed by: Scott Sonneborn; Tommy Vad Flaaten; Markus Vad Flaaten; Alan Keane; Shane Perez
- Showrunner: Jordan Gaucher
- Directed by: Tommy Vad Flaaten; Markus Vad Flaaten
- Voices of: Laura Aikman; David Menkin; Dash Kruck; Nick Mohammed; Roger Gregg; Damien Garvey; Lynette Callaghan
- Theme music composer: Markus Vad Flaaten
- Opening theme: "Space Chickens in Space" by Tommy Vad Flaaten, Markus Vad Flaaten, and Sunniva Funderud
- Ending theme: "Cosmic Love" by Tommy and Markus Vad Flaaten
- Composer: Jonathan Casey
- Countries of origin: Mexico; United Kingdom; Australia; Ireland
- Original languages: English; Spanish
- No. of seasons: 1
- No. of episodes: 26 (51 segments)

Production
- Executive producers: Fernado De Fuentes S. José C. García de Letona; Tom van Waveren; Ed Galton; Andrew Davies; Julia Adams
- Producers: Andrew Davies; Lindsey Adams
- Running time: 23 minutes
- Production companies: Ánima Estudios; Cake Entertainment; Studio Moshi; Gingerbread Animation; Ingenious Media

Original release
- Network: 9Go! (Australia); Disney XD (international)
- Release: 30 September 2018 – 9 June 2019

Space Chickens in Space is a science fiction-comedy animated television series created by José C. García de Letona and Rita Street and developed by Scott Sonneborn, Tommy and Markus Vad Flaaten, Alan Keane, and Shane Perez for 9Go! and Disney XD. The series was produced by Ánima Estudios, Cake Entertainment, Studio Moshi, Gingerbread Animation and Ingenious Media, with the participation of Disney EMEA.

== Plot ==
Chuck, Starley, and Finley are taken from their home and mistakenly enrolled in an elite intergalactic former military academy.

== Characters ==
=== Main ===
- Chuck (voiced by David Menkin) is a male tall chicken who is the leader of the chicken siblings. He is cool, daring, and wacky. He can be selfish and stubborn when it comes to challenges, but he is a true softie when it comes to his siblings. He is the youngest of the three.
- Finley (voiced by Nick Mohammed and Dash Kruck) is a male short chicken who is the brains of the chicken siblings. He is smart, inquisitive, and mostly calm-mannered. But he can become short-tempered when no one (especially his brother and sister) describes his ideas as good ideas. He is the oldest of the three.
- Starley (voiced by Laura Aikman) is a female chicken who is the loving one of the siblings. Being the middle sister, Starley always looks after her brothers and defends them no matter what. She also has born super-strength.

=== Recurring ===
- Glargg (voiced by Roger Gregg and Damien Garvey) is a Green Alien.
- Niven (voiced by Lynette Callaghan) is a Female Blue Alien.

== Production ==
Space Chickens in Space is fully animated in-house at Studio Moshi (Australia) using their bespoke hybrid Harmony animation pipeline, incorporating a mixture of hand-drawn and high-quality rigged animation. Studio Moshi provided animation direction, design (original production-ready characters and original world development), storyboard supervision & artwork, hand-crafted digital animation, visual FX.

== Release ==
The series premiered on 9Go! in Australia on 30 September 2018, on 2x2 TV Channel in Russia on 1 January 2020, and had its Disney XD premiere in Europe, Middle-East and Africa on 19 November 2018. In April 2022, all episodes and shorts were made available on Disney+.

== Episodes ==
No.	Title	Written by	Storyboard by	Original release date	Prod. code	Australian viewers (millions)
1	"Trolling Thrognak"	Tim Allsop & Stewart Williams	Jakob Foged	30 September 2018	101	N/A
1	"Bliblisitting"	Shane Perez	Aaron Davies	30 September 2018	101	N/A
"Trolling Thrognak": Chuck accidentally causes an intergalactic space battle when he insults the Horde of Darkness on the internet. "Bliblisitting": Principle Glargg puts his faith in Starley to babysit his pet Blibli while he's away from the academy.
2	"Best Pal"	James Hamilton & James Huntrods	Jakob Foged	7 October 2018	102	N/A
2	"The Egg"	Tim Allsop & Stewart Williams	Barry Reynolds	7 October 2018	102	N/A
"Best Pal": Chuck plays on Finley's insecurities, making him question his friendship with PAL 9000. To win the petty argument, Finley gives PAL 9000 free will and it changes everything. "The Egg": When Starley plays with a cute but dangerous creature, he is suddenly transformed into an adorable chick. Now Chuck and Finley must look after Baby Starley.
3	"Atori"	Stuart Kenworthy	Barry Reynolds	14 October 2018	103	N/A
3	"Players Gotta Play"	James Phelan	Krystal Georgiou	14 October 2018	103	N/A
"Atori": Chuck, Starley, and Finley need to find jobs and realise that bounty hunting is a lucrative way to make money. "Players Gotta Play": Chuck, Starley, and Finley organize a play that accidentally incited an intergalactic war. They attempt to stage another play in order to bring about peace.
4	"Green-Eyed Monster"	Alan Keane	Luke Allen & Aaron Davies	21 October 2018	104	N/A
4	"I Believe I Can Fly"	Shane Perez	Barry Reynolds	21 October 2018	104	N/A
"Green-Eyed Monster": When Starley and Chuck bail on another science project, a frustrated Finley searches for a new partner and is pleased to discover his intellectual equal in new student, Adele. "I Believe I Can Fly": Starley struggles to control her temper as she yearns to fly, and must wait for the mysterious Supreme Chickeness to help or hinder her quest,
5	"Friendchip"	Story by : Stuart Kenworthy; Teleplay by : Mike Heneghan	Gavin Fullerton	28 October 2018	105	N/A
5	"Freezing Awesome"	Ciaran Morrison & Mick O'Hara	Patricia Ross	28 October 2018	105	N/A
"Friendchip": When Narcy reprograms an old Killbot robot to be the perfect best friend, it falls on Narcy and Starley to join forces to stop the rogue robot from destroying the academy. "Freezing Awesome": Finley decides to create the ultimate time-freezing device, but his obsession with freezing time causes serious damage to AIIA's core.
6	"Idle Idols"	James Hamilton & James Huntrods	Marylène Sun	4 November 2018	106	N/A
6	"Try Not to Laugh"	Richard Preddy	Krystal Georgiou	4 November 2018	106	N/A
7	"Food Fight"	Kristina Yee	Gavin Fullerton	11 November 2018	107	N/A
7	"Poor Dweezil"	James Hamilton & James Huntrods	Dan Hamman	11 November 2018	107	N/A
8	"Floofy Flibby Kiss Kiss"	Ciarán Morrison & Mick O'Hara	Krystal Georgiou	18 November 2018	108	N/A
8	"You Snooze You Cruise"	James Phelan	Gavin Fullerton	18 November 2018	108	N/A
9	"Three Trippion Parsec Trip"	Alan Keane	Jakob Foged	24 November 2018	109	N/A
9	"Final Exam"	Tim Allsop & Stewart Williams	Barry Reynolds	24 November 2018	109	N/A
10	"Alpha Chuck"	Mike Heneghan	Barry Reynolds	25 November 2018	110	N/A
10	"Being Glargg"	Alan Keane	Krystal Georgiou	25 November 2018	110	N/A
11	"All Flying and Chill"	Diarmuid O'Brien	Chuck Klein	1 December 2018	111	N/A
11	"Jail Birds"	Shane Perez	Barry Reynolds	1 December 2018	111	N/A
12	"Ommminous Foreshadowing"	James Hamilton & James Huntrods	Krystal Georgiou	2 December 2018	112	N/A
12	"Draw Anything"	Ciarán Morrison & Mick O'Hara	Barry Reynolds	2 December 2018	112	N/A
13	"Academy Rules"	Tommy Vad Flaaten & Markus Vad Flaaten	Tommy Vad Flaaten & Markus Vad Flaaten	8 December 2018	113	N/A
14	"Cadet Clarkk"	Evan Menzel	Marylène Sun	9 December 2018	114	N/A
14	"Stop Bugging Me"	Diarmuid O'Brien	Dan Hamman	9 December 2018	114	N/A
15	"Personal Spacetime"	James Hamilton & James Huntrods	Marylène Sun	15 December 2018	115	N/A
15	"Chicken in the Egg"	Mike Heneghan	Krystal Georgiou	15 December 2018	115	N/A
16	"Chuck's First Command"	Diarmuid O'Brien	Barry Reynolds	31 March 2019	116	N/A
16	"One of a Kind"	James Hamilton & James Huntrods	Gavin Fullerton	31 March 2019	116	N/A
17	"Beat Beat Chicken Chicken"	Ciarán Morrison & Mick O'Hara	Krystal Georgiou	7 April 2019	117	N/A
17	"Finley Cleanly"	Evan Menzel	Dan Hamman	7 April 2019	117	N/A
18	"The Chicken Feed"	Lucy Heavens	Valentina Delmiglio	14 April 2019	118	N/A
18	"Quizardry"	Evan Menzel	Gavin Fullerton	14 April 2019	118	N/A
19	"Pale Blue Rock"	Shane Perez	Marylène Sun	21 April 2019	119	N/A
19	"Blibli Squared"	Brydie Lee-Kennedy & Tobi Wilson	Barry Reynolds	21 April 2019	119	N/A
20	"The Good Guy Choice"	Diarmuid O'Brien	Dan Hamman	28 April 2019	120	N/A
20	"Presidential Coop"	James Phelan	Patricia Ross	28 April 2019	120	N/A
21	"Phil My Heart"	Alan Keane	Jessica Toth	5 May 2019	121	N/A
21	"Snot Like This"	James Hamilton & James Huntrods	Krystal Georgiou	5 May 2019	121	N/A
22	"No Brain No Pain"	James Hamilton & James Huntrods	Krystal Georgiou	12 May 2019	122	N/A
22	"Who's Wearing the Cool Pants?"	Paul McKeown	Mark Flood	12 May 2019	122	N/A
23	"Secret Society of the Secret Thing"	James Hamilton & James Huntrods	Jessica Toth	19 May 2019	123	N/A
23	"Bad Bad Bad"	Lucy Heavens	Marylène Sun	19 May 2019	123	N/A
24	"Smells Like Chicken"	Evan Menzel	Dan Hamman	26 May 2019	124	N/A
24	"Smartest Chicken in Town"	James Phelan	Barry Reynolds	26 May 2019	124	N/A
25	"Ultimate Niven"	Lucy Heavens	Barry Reynolds	2 June 2019	125	N/A
25	"Camp Ghosty Pants"	Lucy Heavens	Patricia Ross	2 June 2019	125	N/A
26	"Chicken Out"	Ciarán Morrison & Mick O'Hara	Gavin Fullerton	9 June 2019	126	N/A
26	"Chicken Back Again"	Ciarán Morrison & Mick O'Hara	Gavin Fullerton	9 June 2019	126	N/A
