= Born to Be Wild – A Retrospective =

Born to Be Wild - A Retrospective

Greatest hits album by Steppenwolf
- Released: November 5, 1991
- Genre: Rock
- Length: 2:28:50
- Label: MCA
- Producer: Andy McKaie

Steppenwolf chronology
Rise & Shine (1990)	Born to Be Wild - A Retrospective (1991)	Live at 25 (1995)

Professional ratings
Review scores
Source	Rating
AllMusic	4.5/5 stars
The Encyclopedia of Popular Music	3/5 stars
MusicHound Rock: The Essential Album Guide	4.5/5 stars
The Rolling Stone Album Guide	4/5 stars

Born to Be Wild – A Retrospective is a 1991 greatest hits album by Steppenwolf. It was the first attempt at a serious historical overview of the band and its founder/leader's career.

== Critical reception ==
The Rolling Stone Album Guide awarded the compilation four stars (out of five), calling it "far and above the best, running the gamut of the band's career and hitting all the high points." MusicHound Rock: The Essential Album Guide called it "concise" and "well-annotated," writing that it "renders almost everything else in the catalog unnecessary."

== Track listing ==
Disc 1

1. "Twisted" (by The Sparrow) – 03:14
2. "Good Morning Little Schoolgirl" (by The Sparrow) – 03:43
3. "Sookie Sookie" – 03:15
4. "Everybody's Next One" – 02:57
5. "Born to be Wild" – 03:30
6. "Your Wall's Too High" – 05:44
7. "Desperation" – 05:47
8. "The Pusher" – 05:51
9. "The Ostrich" – 05:45
10. "Don't Step on the Grass, Sam" – 05:41
11. "Magic Carpet Ride" – 04:22
12. "Rock Me" – 03:44
13. "Jupiter's Child" – 03:23
14. "It's Never Too Late" – 04:05
15. "Monster/Suicide/America" – 09:13
16. "Move Over" – 02:54
17. "Hey Lawdy Mama" – 02:53

Disc 2

1. "Snowblind Friend" – 03:55
2. "Who Needs Ya" – 02:53
3. "Screaming Night Hog" – 03:17
4. "For Ladies Only" (edit) – 04:53
5. "Tenderness" – 04:56
6. "Ride with Me" – 03:23
7. "I'm Movin' On" (by John Kay) – 03:08
8. "My Sportin' Life" (by John Kay) – 05:18
9. "Children of the Night" – 05:12
10. "Straight Shootin' Woman" – 04:02
11. "Caroline" – 04:45
12. "Live Your Life" (feat. Lowell George) * – 04:14
13. "Ain't Nothing Like it Used to Be" – 03:50
14. "Born to be Wild (live)" * – 04:47
15. "Rock 'N' Roll Rebels" – 04:01
16. "Give Me News I Can Use" – 03:41
17. "The Wall" – 06:20

Note: "*" = previously unreleased.
