= List of 24 Hours in A&E episodes =

24 Hours in A&E is a British factual medical documentary programme, airing on Channel 4, set in a teaching hospitals in inner London and Nottingham.

As of 22 August 2026, the show has run for 36 seasons. There were 326 episodes during the first 35 seasons. An additional 22 special edition episodes have aired, in which the cast reflect over their most memorable moments of the series.

== Episodes ==
=== Series overview ===
Series	Episodes	Originally released	
Series	Episodes	First released	Last released
1	14	11 May 2011	10 August 2011
2	14	16 May 2012	15 August 2012
3	21	10 April 2013	28 August 2013
4	6	13 November 2013	18 December 2013
5	8	8 January 2014	26 February 2014
6	7	7 May 2014	16 June 2014
7	8	30 October 2014	18 December 2014
8	13	7 January 2015	1 April 2015
9	8	27 May 2015	15 July 2015
10	24	20 October 2015	13 April 2016
11	11	16 May 2016	27 July 2016
12	21	16 November 2016	10 April 2017
13	12	31 May 2017	30 August 2017
14	9	2 January 2018	27 February 2018
15	18	16 May 2018	12 September 2018
16	6	12 November 2018	17 December 2018
17	8	8 January 2019	26 February 2019
18	16	7 May 2019	20 August 2019
19	5	18 November 2019	16 December 2019
20	10	14 January 2020	16 March 2020
21	4	16 June 2020	7 July 2020
22	6	2 September 2020	7 October 2020
23	8	12 January 2021	2 March 2021
24	10	31 May 2021	2 August 2021
25	3	2 December 2021	14 December 2021
26	8	18 January 2022	15 March 2022
27	6	11 July 2022	15 August 2022
28	3	5 September 2022	19 September 2022
29	3	3 October 2022	17 October 2022
30	7	3 January 2023	14 February 2023
31	4	10 July 2023	31 July 2023
32	5	5 March 2024	1 April 2024
33	6	10 June 2024	5 August 2024
34	10	13 February 2025	17 April 2025
35	4	27 May 2025	17 June 2025
Specials	22	5 June 2013	present

=== Series 1 (2011) ===
No.	Title	Original release date	UK viewers (millions)
1	"Code Red"	11 May 2011	2.70
2	"Red Phone"	18 May 2011	2.41
3	"Back in Resus"	25 May 2011	2.64
4	"Booze Has Ruined My Life"	1 June 2011	2.24
5	"Booze Has Ruined My Life"	8 June 2011	2.54
6	"Woken at Gunpoint"	15 June 2011	2.65
7	"For Penetrating Trauma"	22 June 2011	2.82
8	"Triple A"	29 June 2011	2.80
9	"Triple A"	6 July 2011	2.84
10	"Episode 10"	13 July 2011	2.60
11	"There are Risks"	20 July 2011	3.12
12	"Resus"	27 July 2011	3.02
13	"Can't Say This or That"	3 August 2011	3.10
14	"Memory Man"	10 August 2011	2.84

=== Series 2 (2012) ===
No.	Title	Original release date	UK viewers (millions)
1	"Rush Hour"	16 May 2012	2.73
2	"Young Ones"	23 May 2012	2.34
3	"Code Red"	30 May 2012	2.63
4	"Allergic to Pain"	6 June 2012	2.16
5	"Vital Organs"	13 June 2012	2.89
6	"One Moment in Time"	20 June 2012	2.99
7	"A Good Life"	27 June 2012	2.50
8	"Saturday Night"	4 July 2012	2.78
9	"Mum"	11 July 2012	2.58
10	"We Are Family"	18 July 2012	3.23
11	"Snow"	25 July 2012	2.71
12	"The "Q" Word"	1 August 2012	2.72
13	"Cause Unknown"	8 August 2012	2.69
14	"Life's Little Hiccups"	15 August 2012	2.61

=== Series 3 (2013) ===
No.	Title	Original release date	UK viewers (millions)
1	"Brief Encounter"	10 April 2013	3.11
2	"Three Sisters"	17 April 2013	3.22
3	"Reality Check"	24 April 2013	2.73
4	"Valentine's Day"	1 May 2013	2.40
5	"Second Chance"	8 May 2013	2.41
6	"Head First"	15 May 2013	2.67
7	"Walk Like a Man"	22 May 2013	2.26
8	"No Regrets"	29 May 2013	2.70
9	"Live & Let Live"	4 June 2013	2.49
10	"Love & Pain"	12 June 2013	2.35
11	"Duty of Care"	19 June 2013	2.28
12	"For Better or Worse"	26 June 2013	2.35
13	"Mothers & Sons"	3 July 2013	2.30
14	"Under the Influence"	10 July 2013	2.29
15	"A Few Good Men"	17 July 2013	2.55
16	"Grin and Bear It"	24 July 2013	2.17
17	"Tough Love"	31 July 2013	2.24
18	"Twilight"	7 August 2013	2.30
19	"Night Shift"	14 August 2013	2.10
20	"Life Blood"	21 August 2013	2.51
21	"Worst Case Scenario"	28 August 2013	2.29

=== Series 4 (2013) ===
No.	Title	Original release date	UK viewers (millions)
1	"Life in the Fast Lane"	13 November 2013	2.44
2	"Love Hurts"	20 November 2013	1.97
3	"One Day at a Time"	27 November 2013	1.64
4	"Remember Me"	4 December 2013	1.63
5	"Mum's the Word"	11 December 2013	2.42
6	"Next of Kin"	18 December 2013	2.42

=== Series 5 (2014) ===
No.	Title	Original release date	UK viewers (millions)
1	"A Time to Laugh"	8 January 2014	2.65
2	"Pick Me Up"	15 January 2014	2.71
3	"Luck of the Draw"	22 January 2014	2.00
4	"Wake-Up Call"	29 January 2014	2.00
5	"City of Angels"	5 February 2014	2.16
6	"The Fall"	12 February 2014	2.28
7	"Amongst Friends"	19 February 2014	2.11
8	"Bolt from the Blue"	26 February 2014	2.35

=== Series 6 (2014) ===
No.	Title	Original release date	UK viewers (millions)
1	"Stand by Me"	7 May 2014	2.77
2	"Young at Heart"	14 May 2014	1.91
3	"Going the Distance"	21 May 2014	2.34
4	"Resilience"	28 May 2014	1.80
5	"Throw of the Dice"	4 June 2014	2.03
6	"Family Matters"	9 June 2014	1.90
7	"Boys Don't Cry"	16 June 2014	2.00

=== Series 7 (2014) ===
Series 7 started on 30 October 2014 with a new cast and new hospital. The new series was set at St Georges Hospital in Tooting London.

No.	Title	Original release date	UK viewers (millions)
1	"One Fine Day"	30 October 2014	2.49
2	"Seize the Day"	6 November 2014	2.52
3	"Somebody to Love"	13 November 2014	2.29
4	"Stay with Me"	20 November 2014	1.79
5	"Bouncing Back"	27 November 2014	1.63
6	"Strong Medicine"	4 December 2014	1.80
7	"Chip Off the Block"	11 December 2014	2.21
8	"In a Heartbeat"	18 December 2014	2.46

=== Series 8 (2015) ===
No.	Title	Original release date	UK viewers (millions)
1	"Modern Families"	7 January 2015	2.14
2	"Addicted to Love"	14 January 2015	2.46
3	"Every Minute Counts"	21 January 2015	1.96
4	"Do No Harm"	28 January 2015	2.32
5	"No Place Like Home"	4 February 2015	2.46
6	"Free Spirit"	11 February 2015	2.50
7	"Emergency Landing"	18 February 2015	2.17
8	"Free Fall"	25 February 2015	2.16
9	"Force of Nature"	4 March 2015	2.23
10	"Don't Look Back"	11 March 2015	2.39
11	"Guardian Angels"	18 March 2015	2.05
12	"Soldier On"	25 March 2015	2.41
13	"Look Forward"	1 April 2015	2.10

=== Series 9 (2015) ===
No.	Title	Original release date	UK viewers (millions)
1	"Summer of Love"	27 May 2015	2.02
2	"The One"	3 June 2015	2.23
3	"Never Too Late"	10 June 2015	2.17
4	"Take Care"	17 June 2015	2.10
5	"Lean on Me"	24 June 2015	2.17
6	"Keep on Moving"	1 July 2015	2.03
7	"Some Like It Hot"	8 July 2015	2.26
8	"Father's Day"	15 July 2015	2.72

=== Series 10 (2015–16) ===
No.	Title	Original release date	UK viewers (millions)
1	"To Sir, with Love"	20 October 2015	2.33
2	"One Step at a Time"	27 October 2015	2.23
3	"Always on My Mind"	3 November 2015	2.52
4	"Give Me Strength"	10 November 2015	2.58
5	"Handle with Care"	17 November 2015	2.28
6	"Out of Sight"	24 November 2015	1.66
7	"First Impressions"	3 December 2015	1.69
8	"Brave Hearts"	9 December 2015	1.92
9	"Independence Days"	16 December 2015	1.99
10	"Fathers and Sons"	23 December 2015	1.95
11	"Extra Time"	30 December 2015	2.03
12	"Glass Half Full"	6 January 2016	2.33
13	"Altered States"	13 January 2016	2.37
14	"Stronger Together"	20 January 2016	1.94
15	"Stiff Upper Lip"	27 January 2016	2.08
16	"Forever Young"	3 February 2016	2.29
17	"Till Death Do Us Part"	10 February 2016	2.24
18	"Training Day"	17 February 2016	2.10
19	"Daddy's Girl"	24 February 2016	2.05
20	"Work Hard Play Hard"	2 March 2016	1.94
21	"New Horizons"	9 March 2016	2.04
22	"Heartbreak"	16 March 2016	2.22
23	"Through Thick and Thin"	23 March 2016	2.46
24	"Coming Home"	13 April 2016	1.96

=== Series 11 (2016) ===
No.	Title	Original release date	UK viewers (millions)
1	"Quality of Life"	16 May 2016	1.56
2	"Love Thy Neighbour"	23 May 2016	1.67
3	"Only Yesterday"	30 May 2016	1.75
4	"Keep Going On"	6 June 2016	1.78
5	"Here We Go Again"	13 June 2016	2.13
6	"Dangerous Pursuits"	20 June 2016	1.95
7	"Lonely Hearts"	27 June 2016	1.97
8	"Love's Sacrifice"	6 July 2016	1.88
9	"You Only Live Once"	13 July 2016	2.35
10	"The Handover"	20 July 2016	2.25
11	"One False Move"	27 July 2016	2.35

=== Series 12 (2016–17) ===
No.	Title	Original release date	UK viewers (millions)
1	"Someone to Watch over Me"	16 November 2016	2.04
2	"Dear Heart"	23 November 2016	2.01
3	"Never Say Die"	30 November 2016	1.89
4	"Time of Our Lives"	7 December 2016	2.13
5	"Time's Arrow"	14 December 2016	2.39
6	"Face Value"	21 December 2016	2.48
7	"You've Got a Friend in Me"	28 December 2016	2.10
8	"In Sickness and in Health"	3 January 2017	2.35
9	"You Raise Me Up"	10 January 2017	2.53
10	"Made of Steel"	17 January 2017	2.69
11	"Flying Solo"	24 January 2017	2.45
12	"The Tree of Life"	31 January 2017	2.13
13	"Carpe Diem"	7 February 2017	2.11
14	"Catch Me if I Fall"	14 February 2017	2.11
15	"Flesh and Blood"	21 February 2017	2.47
16	"Safe from Harm"	28 February 2017	2.42
17	"Sweethearts"	13 March 2017	1.91
18	"Against All Odds"	20 March 2017	1.92
19	"Stand by Your Man"	27 March 2017	2.14
20	"Boys Will Be Boys"	3 April 2017	2.02
21	"Candle in the Wind"	10 April 2017	2.12

=== Series 13 (2017) ===
No.	Title	Original release date	UK viewers (millions)
1	"Just Seventeen"	31 May 2017	N/A
2	"Love Through the Ages"	7 June 2017	N/A
3	"Growing Pains"	14 June 2017	N/A
4	"Road to Freedom"	21 June 2017	N/A
5	"Game of Chance"	28 June 2017	N/A
6	"Lost and Found"	5 July 2017	N/A
7	"Special Relationships"	12 July 2017	N/A
8	"Broken Heart"	26 July 2017	N/A
9	"Forget Me Not"	9 August 2017	N/A
10	"My Guiding Star"	16 August 2017	N/A
11	"Supporting Cast"	24 August 2017	N/A
12	"Love Conquers All"	30 August 2017	N/A

=== Series 14 (2018) ===
No.	Title	Original release date	UK viewers (millions)
1	"The Unknown"	2 January 2018	N/A
2	"Bringing Up Baby"	9 January 2018	N/A
3	"Wrong Place, Wrong Time"	16 January 2018	N/A
4	"Unconditional Love"	23 January 2018	N/A
5	"Shelter from the Storm"	30 January 2018	N/A
6	"Collision Course"	6 February 2018	N/A
7	"Out of the Fire"	13 February 2018	N/A
8	"The Courage to Go On"	20 February 2018	N/A
9	"Lost for Words"	27 February 2018	N/A

=== Series 15 (2018) ===
No.	Title	Original release date	UK viewers (millions)
1	"Every Cloud..."	16 May 2018	N/A
2	"Born to Be Wild"	23 May 2018	N/A
3	"The Underdogs"	30 May 2018	N/A
4	"Liberation Day"	6 June 2018	N/A
5	"The Good Fight"	13 June 2018	N/A
6	"Child at Heart"	20 June 2018	N/A
7	"Live for Today"	27 June 2018	N/A
8	"Safe Haven"	4 July 2018	N/A
9	"My Other Half"	11 July 2018	N/A
10	"Someone to Come Home To"	18 July 2018	N/A
11	"A Stubborn Kind of Fellow"	25 July 2018	N/A
12	"Heart of the Home"	1 August 2018	N/A
13	"In the Line of Duty"	8 August 2018	N/A
14	"Heavens Above"	15 August 2018	N/A
15	"Moving On Up"	22 August 2018	N/A
16	"A Friend in Need"	29 August 2018	N/A
17	"Down to Earth"	5 September 2018	N/A
18	"Love's Young Dream"	12 September 2018	N/A

=== Series 16 (2018) ===
No.	Title	Original release date	UK viewers (millions)
1	"Value of Life"	12 November 2018	N/A
2	"Mother's Courage"	19 November 2018	N/A
3	"Inside Out"	26 November 2018	N/A
4	"To Have and to Hold"	3 December 2018	N/A
5	"A Job for Life"	10 December 2018	N/A
6	"I Will Survive"	17 December 2018	N/A

=== Series 17 (2019) ===
No.	Title	Original release date	UK viewers (millions)
1	"Acts of Love"	8 January 2019	N/A
2	"A Change Is Gonna Come"	15 January 2019	N/A
3	"The Cards We're Dealt"	22 January 2019	N/A
4	"Do the Right Thing"	29 January 2019	N/A
5	"Man Down"	5 February 2019	N/A
6	"Walk on the Wild Side"	12 February 2019	N/A
7	"Look Both Ways"	19 February 2019	N/A
8	"A Road Less Travelled"	26 February 2019	N/A

=== Series 18 (2019) ===
No.	Title	Original release date	UK viewers (millions)
1	"From This Day Forward"	7 May 2019	N/A
2	"Leap of Faith"	14 May 2019	N/A
3	"Roll with the Punches"	21 May 2019	N/A
4	"The Extra Mile"	28 May 2019	N/A
5	"Mother's Little Helper"	4 June 2019	N/A
6	"I'll Stand by You"	11 June 2019	N/A
7	"Too Close for Comfort"	18 June 2019	N/A
8	"The Outsiders"	25 June 2019	N/A
9	"You Before Me"	2 July 2019	N/A
10	"The Kids Are Alright"	9 July 2019	N/A
11	"Fix You"	16 July 2019	N/A
12	"You're All I Need to Get By"	23 July 2019	N/A
13	"The Survivors"	30 July 2019	N/A
14	"Call of Duty"	6 August 2019	N/A
15	"Children of Men"	13 August 2019	N/A
16	"Saving Grace"	20 August 2019	N/A

=== Series 19 (2019) ===
No.	Title	Original release date	UK viewers (millions)
1	"Endless Love"	18 November 2019	N/A
2	"A Pillar of Strength"	25 November 2019	N/A
3	"Go Your Own Way"	2 December 2019	N/A
4	"In Love and War"	9 December 2019	N/A
5	"A Life Less Ordinary"	16 December 2019	N/A

=== Series 20 (2020) ===
No.	Title	Original release date	UK viewers (millions)
1	"Pressure Point"	14 January 2020	N/A
2	"Live and Learn"	21 January 2020	N/A
3	"Because the Night..."	28 January 2020	N/A
4	"One of the Family"	4 February 2020	N/A
5	"Count My Blessings"	11 February 2020	N/A
6	"Circle of Life"	18 February 2020	N/A
7	"Forever Changes"	25 February 2020	N/A
8	"Great Expectations"	3 March 2020	N/A
9	"Pride & Prejudice"	9 March 2020	N/A
10	"Best Laid Plans"	16 March 2020	N/A

=== Series 21 (2020) ===
No.	Title	Original release date	UK viewers (millions)
1	"Nothing Can Divide Us"	16 June 2020	N/A
2	"Someone to Lean On"	23 June 2020	N/A
3	"Never Let Me Go"	30 June 2020	N/A
4	"In Safe Hands"	7 July 2020	N/A

=== Series 22 (2020) ===
No.	Title	Original release date	UK viewers (millions)
1	"The Missing"	2 September 2020	N/A
2	"The Sound of My Voice"	9 September 2020	N/A
3	"Dear Father"	16 September 2020	N/A
4	"Skin Deep"	23 September 2020	N/A
5	"Ever Decreasing Circles"	30 September 2020	N/A
6	"The Show Must Go On"	7 October 2020	N/A

=== Series 23 (2021) ===
No.	Title	Original release date	UK viewers (millions)
1	"Count on Me"	12 January 2021	N/A
2	"You Can't Buy Love"	19 January 2021	N/A
3	"Pay It Forward"	26 January 2021	N/A
4	"Enduring Love"	2 February 2021	N/A
5	"Field of Dreams"	9 February 2021	N/A
6	"Going the Distance"	16 February 2021	N/A
7	"Learning Curve"	23 February 2021	N/A
8	"Safety Net"	2 March 2021	N/A

=== Series 24 (2021) ===
No.	Title	Original release date	UK viewers (millions)
1	"Lead by Example"	31 May 2021	N/A
2	"Sacrifice"	7 June 2021	N/A
3	"Someone to Talk To"	14 June 2021	N/A
4	"Lasting Legacy"	21 June 2021	N/A
5	"Into the Light"	28 June 2021	N/A
6	"Everybody Needs Somebody"	5 July 2021	N/A
7	"Support Bubble"	12 July 2021	N/A
8	"Blink of an Eye"	19 July 2021	N/A
9	"Turn Back Time"	26 July 2021	N/A
10	"With or Without You"	2 August 2021	N/A

=== Series 25 (2021) ===
No.	Title	Original release date	UK viewers (millions)
1	"Back to Square One"	2 December 2021	N/A
2	"In the Wars"	9 December 2021	N/A
3	"Keep Calm and Carry On"	14 December 2021	N/A

=== Series 26 (2022) ===
No.	Title	Original release date	UK viewers (millions)
1	"Legacy"	18 January 2022	N/A
2	"Lost in Translation"	25 January 2022	N/A
3	"By Your Side"	1 February 2022	N/A
4	"A Love Without End"	8 February 2022	N/A
5	"Sliding Doors"	15 February 2022	N/A
6	"I Got You, Babe"	22 February 2022	N/A
7	"Hope Springs Eternal"	8 March 2022	N/A
8	"Where There's a Will..."	15 March 2022	N/A

=== Series 27 (2022) ===
No.	Title	Original release date	UK viewers (millions)
1	"Lessons in Life"	11 July 2022	N/A
2	"Something Charged"	18 July 2022	N/A
3	"An Education in Happiness"	25 July 2022	N/A
4	"A Love Like No Other"	1 August 2022	N/A
5	"You Are Not Alone"	8 August 2022	N/A
6	"A Hand to Hold"	15 August 2022	N/A

=== Series 28 (2022) ===
No.	Title	Original release date	UK viewers (millions)
1	"Reach Out Your Hand"	5 September 2022	N/A
2	"A Load to Carry"	12 September 2022	N/A
3	"Sons and Daughters"	19 September 2022	N/A

=== Series 29 (2022) ===
No.	Title	Original release date	UK viewers (millions)
1	"Falling Down"	3 October 2022	N/A
2	"Time to Care"	10 October 2022	N/A
3	"My Happy Place"	17 October 2022	N/A

=== Series 30 (2023) ===
Series 30 started on 3 January 2023 with a new cast and new hospital. The new series was set at Queen's Medical Centre in Nottingham.

No.	Title	Original release date	UK viewers (millions)
1	"Tales of the Unexpected"	3 January 2023	N/A
2	"Husbands and Wives"	10 January 2023	N/A
3	"Keep the Faith"	17 January 2023	N/A
4	"The Unforeseen"	24 January 2023	N/A
5	"Teenage Dreams"	31 January 2023	N/A
6	"People Like Us"	7 February 2023	N/A
7	"I'll Be There"	14 February 2023	N/A

=== Series 31 (2023) ===
No.	Title	Original release date	UK viewers (millions)
1	"The Fighter"	10 July 2023	N/A
2	"Till We Meet Again"	17 July 2023	N/A
3	"Finding My Voice"	24 July 2023	N/A
4	"Life's Too Short"	31 July 2023	N/A

=== Series 32 (2024) ===
No.	Title	Original release date	UK viewers (millions)
1	"About a Boy"	5 March 2024	N/A
2	"I Got You"	13 March 2024	N/A
3	"Trouble in Mind"	22 March 2024	N/A
4	"Blood, Sweat, and Tears"	25 March 2024	N/A
5	"Together We Have It All"	1 April 2024	N/A

=== Series 33 (2024) ===
No.	Title	Original release date	UK viewers (millions)
1	"Boys Just Want to Have Fun"	10 June 2024	N/A
2	"Boys Just Want to Have Fun"	17 June 2024	N/A
3	"It's My Life"	8 July 2024	N/A
4	"Family Values"	15 July 2024	N/A
5	"A Risk Worth Taking"	29 July 2024	N/A
6	"A Shoulder to Lean On"	5 August 2024	N/A

=== Series 34 (2025) ===
No.	Title	Original release date	UK viewers (millions)
1	"Worlds Falling Apart"	13 February 2025	N/A
2	"A Song from the Darkest Hour"	20 February 2025	N/A
3	"Everything to Me"	27 February 2025	N/A
4	"Find Your Own Way"	3 March 2025	N/A
5	"Never Let You Down"	13 March 2025	N/A
6	"Brave New World"	20 March 2025	N/A
7	"Say You'll Be There"	27 March 2025	N/A
8	"See the Light"	3 April 2025	N/A
9	"State of the Nation"	10 April 2025	N/A
10	"The Last Roll Of the Dice"	17 April 2025	N/A

=== Series 35 (2025) ===
No.	Title	Original release date	UK viewers (millions)
1	"The Ultimate Price"	27 May 2025	N/A
2	"Picking Up the Pieces"	3 June 2025	N/A
3	"Bless The Child"	10 June 2025	N/A
4	"Where We Belong"	17 June 2025	N/A

=== Specials ===
Title	Original release date	UK viewers (millions)
"The Making of 24 Hours in A&E"	5 June 2013	1.07
"24 Hours in A&E for Stand Up To Cancer"	19 October 2016	N/A
"Heart Special"	17 March 2020	1.66
"Remembrance Day"	14 July 2020	2.28
"Ready for Anything"	21 July 2020	2.34
"On the Edge"	28 July 2020	2.11
"Survivors"	4 August 2020	N/A
"Miracles"	14 October 2020	N/A
"Family Ties"	11 November 2020	N/A
" Journey of Life"	18 November 2020	N/A
"Guardian Angels"	25 November 2020	N/A
"Never Really Alone"	9 March 2021	N/A
"Worlds Collide"	30 March 2021	N/A
"Labour of Love"	10 August 2021	N/A
"Turn Back the Clock"	17 August 2021	N/A
"Precious Time"	24 August 2021	N/A
"A Better Life"	31 August 2021	N/A
"Just the Way You Are"	7 September 2021	N/A
"One True Love"	1 March 2022	N/A
"Into the Light..."	7 March 2022	N/A
"A Life's Work"	21 March 2022	N/A
"Someone to Stand by Me"	28 March 2022	N/A
"Turning Over a New Leaf"	24 May 2022	N/A
"Side By Side"	31 May 2022	N/A
"Always by Your Side"	13 June 2022	N/A
"Family Bonds"	21 March 2023	N/A
"The Ripple Effect"	18 May 2023	N/A
"The Ones We Love"	1 July 2024	N/A
