= David Menkin =

Norwegian actor (born 1977)

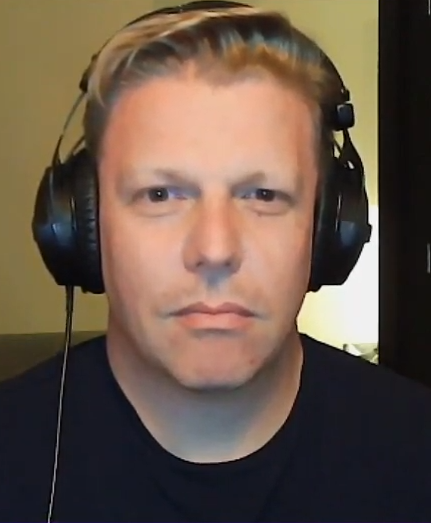
- Menkin in 2021
- Born: 10 May 1977 (age 49); Moss, Norway
- Citizenship: Norway; United States
- Education: New York University
- Occupation: Actor
- Years active: 2001–present

David Menkin (born 10 May 1977) is a Norwegian-born American actor. He is best known for his voice roles as Porter and Jack in the US dub of Thomas & Friends (2013–2021) and as Virgil and Gordon Tracy in the 2015 reboot series Thunderbirds Are Go (2015–2020).

His other voice roles in animation and video games include Scoop and Travis in the US version of Bob the Builder, Dad Hooman in Floogals, Chuck in Space Chickens in Space, Munki and Rocky in Jungle Beat: The Movie, Malos in Xenoblade Chronicles 2, Captain Joseph Brady in Battlefield 3, Breach in Valorant, Magnus in Final Fantasy XIV: Shadowbringers, Luke Skywalker in Lego Star Wars: The Skywalker Saga, Barnabas Tharmr in Final Fantasy XVI and Hugh Williams in Pragmata.

== Early life ==
Menkin was born to a Norwegian mother and an American father in Moss, where he partially spent his childhood before the family moved to Benin to partake in Saga Petrolium's oil drilling in West Africa. In a 2018 radio interview, he stated that the bi-cultural upbringing made "a great impression" on him. As an adolescent, Menkin and his family moved to London. He attended New York University and graduated in 1999 from Mountview Theatre School in London, where he still lives and works as an actor.

== Career ==
In 2001, Menkin had a minor role for the television film Wit.

His film roles include A Hologram for the King, Octane, Zero Dark Thirty, Survivor, Arthur Christmas, The Man from U.N.C.L.E., Florence Foster Jenkins and the documentary Project Nim.

For many years he was provided the announcer voice for the Norwegian TV channel TV3.

He was a member of Thomas & Friends's voice cast from 2013 until 2021 where he voiced Porter and Jack in the US version. He also voiced Stanley for Season 19 only, which was passed on to Rob Rackstraw and John Schwab. He was also asked to voice the title role of Thomas for the US version after Martin Sherman's departure from the series, but he passed on the offer, citing support for Sherman, so it passed on to Joseph May instead. From 2015, he voiced Virgil and Gordon Tracy in the rebooted Thunderbirds Are Go television series. In 2017, Menkin provided the voice for Chuck, who was one of Space Chickens in Space's lead characters.

On the Norwegian TV series Lykkeland, Menkin plays Jackson. The series premiered on NRK and DR1 October 2018. Lykkeland won Best Script and Best Music at Canneseries in April of the same year. Menkin stated that his role on Lykkeland was his "first proper Norwegian acting job".

== Personal life ==
He speaks English and Norwegian. Menkin is gay.

== Filmography ==
=== Film ===
Year	Title	Role	Notes
2003	Octane	Paramedic No. 2	
2010	Bob the Builder: The Legend of the Golden Hammer	Scoop and Travis	Voice, US version
2011	Bob the Builder: Big Dino Dig	Scoop	Voice
2011	Arthur Christmas	Elf	Voice, uncredited
2012	Zero Dark Thirty	Case Officer	
2013	King of the Railway	Jack	Voice, US version; uncredited
2014	Tale of the Brave	Porter	Supporting US voice
2015	Molly Moon and the Incredible Book of Hypnotism	Qube Dad	
2015	Survivor	Traffic Cop	
2015	Sodor's Legend of the Lost Treasure	Jack	Voice, US version
2015	The Man from U.N.C.L.E.	Jones	
2015	Trade Marked	Don Weissman	Short film
2016	A Hologram for the King	Brad	
2016	Florence Foster Jenkins	Carlton Smith	
2016	Thomas & Friends: The Great Race	Porter	Voice, US version
2016	Invited for Dinner	Kris	Short film
2017	Flowers for No One		Short film
2018	Thomas & Friends: Big World! Big Adventures!	A racing car	Supporting role
2018	Clotches & Blow	Daniel	Short film
2018	Moths to Flame	Neil Armstrong	Short film
2019	The Phoenix Method		Short film
2019	Roger	Aaron	Short film
2019	Thomas & Friends: Digs and Discoveries	Jack	Voice, US version
2019	The Angry Birds Movie 2	Taco Bird	Voice
2020	Nocturne	John	Short film
2020	Jungle Beat: The Movie	Munki and Rocky	Voice
2021	Ron's Gone Wrong	Shayne the Biker, Mr. Cleaver	Voice
2023	A Haunting in Venice	Puppet Show MC	
2025	Grand Prix of Europe	Magnus	Voice, English version
2025	Heads of State	Beast Driver	
2026	Fatherland	Arthur Quint	
2026	Clayface	Homicide Detective	

=== Television ===
Year	Title	Role	Notes
2001	Wit	Student No. 1	Television film
2008	Chop Socky Chooks	Additional voices	
2010–2012	Bob the Builder	Scoop and Travis	Voice, US version
2013	Strike Back	Lieutenant Greg	Episode: #4.10
2013–2021	Thomas & Friends	Porter, Jack, Stanley	Voice, US version
2014	Drifters	Bendt	Episode: "Goole"
2014–2015	The Top Ten Show		22 episodes
2015	Fortitude	Guest No. 1	Episode: #1.1
2015–2020	Thunderbirds Are Go	Virgil Tracy, Gordon Tracy, additional voices	Voice, main role
2015	Reggie & Thunderbirds: No Strings Attached	Himself	Documentary
2016	Boomers	Hawkan	Episode: "Camping"
2016	Red Dwarf	Lieutenant Clarence O'Neal	Episode: "Twentica"
2016–2018	Floogals	Dad Hooman	Voice, 52 episodes
2016	Lastman	Additional voices	2 episodes
2017	Fearless	Sergeant Marcus	Miniseries, 2 episodes
2018	McMafia	Marius Jensen	Episode: #1.6
2018	Deep State	SEAL Team Op. No. 2	Episode: "Merger"
2018	Lykkeland	Jackson	5 episodes
2018–2019	Space Chickens in Space	Chuck	Voice, main role
2019	Best Bugs Forever	Eddie	
2020	Home	Ulf	Episode: "#2.2"
2020	Jessy and Nessy	Block	Voice
2021–present	Blippi Wonders	Various voices	Voice
2022	The Sandman	The Hammer of God	
2023	Captain Laserhawk: A Blood Dragon Remix	Rayman	Voice

=== Audiobooks ===
Year	Title	Author	Notes
2014	Where Evil Lies	Jørgen Brekke	ISBN 9781447272014
2016	The Confessions of Dorian Gray - The Lord of Misrule	Simon Barnard	ISBN 9781785750823
2019	The Vault	Mark Dawson	ISBN 9781799770053
2019	The Talented Mr Ripley	Patricia Highsmith	ISBN 9781405503280

=== Video games ===
Year	Title	Role	Notes
2004	Alias	Additional voices	
2005	EyeToy: Kinetic	Additional voices	
2008	Battlefield: Bad Company	Preston Marlowe	
2009	Colin McRae: Dirt 2	Scandinavian Male	
2010	Battlefield: Bad Company 2	Preston Marlowe	
2010	Kinect Sports	Additional voices	English version
2011	LittleBigPlanet 2	Wally West / Flash	
2011	Crysis 2	Gary	
2011	Operation Flashpoint: Red River	Marines	
2011	Battlefield 3	Captain Joseph Brady	
2012	Syndicate	Father, Interrogator	
2012	LittleBigPlanet PS Vita	Wally West / Flash	
2013	Killzone Shadow Fall	Aide	
2014	Alien: Isolation	Additional voices	
2015	Soma	Jesse, Carl Semken, additional voices	
2015	Lego Dimensions	Additional voices	
2015	Guitar Hero Live	Additional voices	
2017	Horizon Zero Dawn	Walla Walla	
2017	Lego Marvel Super Heroes 2	Ghost Rider, Skaar	
2017	Xenoblade Chronicles 2	Malos	
2018	World of Warcraft: Battle for Azeroth	Additional voices	
2018	Overkill's The Walking Dead	The Brigade	
2018	Raft	Olof Wilkstrom	
2018	Xenoblade Chronicles 2: Torna – The Golden Country	Malos	
2019	SpellForce 3: Soul Harvest	Kaiawu, Alyani Architect	
2019	Final Fantasy XIV: Shadowbringers	Magnus	
2019	Control	Additional voices	
2020	Valorant	Breach	
2020	Assassin's Creed Valhalla	Dag	
2022	Lego Star Wars: The Skywalker Saga	Luke Skywalker	
2022	Arknights	Rangers, Corroserum	
2023	Final Fantasy XVI	Barnabas Tharmr	
2025	Vampire: The Masquerade – Bloodlines 2	Michael Tolliver	
2025	The First Berserker: Khazan	Rangkus	
2026	Pragmata	Hugh Williams	
2026	Luna Abyss	The Waif, Atticus Lynch, The All-Father	
TBA	Squadron 42	Devin Bautista	Post-production
TBA	Emberville	Unannounced role	In production
