= Libertas Institute (Utah) =

Libertarian think tank

- Established: December 2011
- Founder: Connor Boyack
- Location: Lehi, Utah
- President: Connor Boyack
- Revenue: $23 million (2025)
- Expenses: $22.7 million (2025)
- Staff: 72 (2025)
- Volunteers: 100 (2025)
- Website: libertas.org

The Libertas Institute (LI) is a libertarian think tank located in Lehi, Utah, United States. The organization's stated mission is "to advance the cause of liberty within the State of Utah." The Institute focuses on free market policies, private property rights, and civil liberties issues, including police reform and drug reform.

== Issues ==
In February 2015, the Libertas Institute and the Drug Policy Project of Utah conducted a poll which showed that the majority of Utah residents favor the legality of medical cannabis. The organization has opposed current regulations on the study of agricultural marijuana, arguing that regulations governing the state's public university research of hemp are too strict. In 2016, the Institute helped draft SB73 to legalize medical cannabis which passed the Utah Senate but was blocked by the House. In 2018, the Institute drafted a ballot initiative to pass medical cannabis. It was opposed by a law firm for the LDS church and the Institute provided a 7,000 word point-by-point rebuttal of the law firm's critiques.

Along with the American Civil Liberties Union of Utah, the Libertas Institute opposed a Utah legislative bill that would allow state police to use unmanned drones without a search warrant. The organization favors allowing ridesharing companies to legally compete with taxi cab companies. In 2026, the Institute worked with Senator John Johnson to draft SB327 which would eliminate licensing requirements for commercial interior designers, court reporters, deception detection practitioners and music therapists. The Institute noted that several states do not require licenses for these occupations and it supports reducing regulations on licensing more broadly.

== Tuttle Twins ==
The Tuttle Twins is a libertarian children's book series published by the Libertas Institute and written by Libertas President Connor Boyack. The series was made into a television show that raised $4.6 million in crowdsourced funding.
