= Angel Studios =

American media company

Angel Studios, Inc.
- Trade name: Angel
- Type: Public
- Traded as: NYSE: ANGX
- Industry: Entertainment
- Predecessor: VidAngel
- Founded: March 25, 2021; 5 years ago
- Founders: Neal Harmon; Daniel Harmon; Jeffrey Harmon; Jordan Harmon; Benton Crane
- Headquarters: Provo, Utah, United States
- Area served: Worldwide
- Key people: Neal Harmon (CEO and chairman)
- Services: Film distribution; Film production; Streaming media; Television distribution; Television production
- Revenue: ▲US$322 million (2025)
- Net income: ▼ −US$170 million (2025)
- Number of employees: 311 (2025)
- Website: angel.com

Angel Studios, Inc., branded as Angel since September 2025, is an American independent publicly traded media company and film distributor based in Provo, Utah. It distributes films theatrically and operates the Angel streaming platform, where some titles are available free and most require membership in the Angel Guild.

The company originated as VidAngel, a film-filtering service that streamed recuts and censored versions of films. In 2021, its founders sold the filtering business and rebranded their content business as Angel Studios, shifting its focus toward crowdfunded film and television production and distribution. The company's current business model centers on the Angel Guild, a paid membership program whose members vote on film and television projects that the company may market and distribute.

Angel markets its output as "values-based entertainment"; although it is not officially a Christian company, its slate includes numerous faith-based productions. The company gained wider recognition with Sound of Freedom, which grossed more than $250 million worldwide. It formerly distributed the television series The Chosen.

== History ==
=== Early years as VidAngel ===
The company was founded in 2013 by brothers Neal, Daniel, Jeffrey, and Jordan Harmon and their cousin Benton Crane. It was originally named VidAngel, and its filtering service launched in 2014. The service allowed viewers to skip or mute selected content in films and television programs, including profanity, nudity, sexual content, and graphic violence.

In June 2016, Disney Enterprises, Lucasfilm, 20th Century Fox, and Warner Bros. sued VidAngel, alleging that the company had copied DVDs and Blu-ray discs and streamed filtered versions of their films without authorization. VidAngel argued that its filtering method was protected by the Family Movie Act of 2005. In August 2017, the Ninth Circuit Court of Appeals upheld a preliminary injunction against the company, finding that the studios were likely to succeed on their copyright claims.

VidAngel filed for Chapter 11 bankruptcy protection in October 2017 and completed its bankruptcy reorganization in 2020. The company reached a settlement with the studios that year and agreed not to decrypt, copy, stream, or distribute Disney and Warner Bros. content without permission.

Following the reorganization, the founders shifted their focus toward producing and distributing original content through equity crowdfunding. The filtering-service assets were sold to a separate company, VidAngel Entertainment, while the original company was renamed Angel Studios in March 2021.

=== Equity crowdfunding ===
In October 2016, while copyright litigation against VidAngel was pending, the company launched a Regulation A securities offering. It offered a minimum of $5 million and a maximum of $11.25 million in Class B nonvoting common stock. The offering circular allocated between $2 million and $3 million of the proceeds to legal fees and expenses, with the remainder intended for research and development, advertising, promotion, and working capital. By November 2016, VidAngel reported raising approximately $10.1 million from more than 7,500 investors.

In December 2016, the company announced the creation of VidAngel Studios, its original-content division. Its first project was Dry Bar Comedy, a series of clean stand-up comedy performances filmed in Utah; the first episode was filmed in January 2017.

In late 2017, VidAngel partnered with The Chosen, LLC to develop and distribute The Chosen, a television series created by Dallas Jenkins about the life of Jesus and his disciples. The Chosen, LLC conducted a Tier 2 Regulation A offering with a maximum offering amount of $13 million to finance the first season. VidAngel provided consulting, technology, public-relations, marketing, and coordination services for the offering. By January 2019, the offering had raised approximately $10.3 million from 15,000 investors, making it the largest crowdfunded film or television project at the time.

=== Launch of Angel Studios ===
In March 2021, VidAngel was renamed Angel Studios after the company divested its film-filtering assets. It shifted its focus toward producing and distributing original films and television programs financed partly through equity crowdfunding.

Under the company's early business model, investors who financed individual productions were called "angels". Selected productions were made available free on the Angel streaming platform, and viewers could make optional "Pay It Forward" contributions to support continued production and access for other viewers. In 2021, the company acquired the domain name angel.com for $2 million.

Crowdfunding offerings for productions were made through the Angel Funding Portal. According to Angel's annual report, the company had sold VAS Portal, LLC, the portal's operator, in 2019. The portal subsequently operated independently, and Angel Studios retained no ownership interest in it.

Productions financed through crowdfunding included Tuttle Twins, which raised $4.6 million, and The Wingfeather Saga, an animated adaptation of Andrew Peterson's fantasy novels. The latter raised $1 million during its first 48 hours and reached its $5 million funding goal in June 2021.

In January 2022, Angel Studios announced that it had raised $47 million in a financing round led by Gigafund and Uncorrelated Ventures. Alta Ventures and Kickstart Fund also participated, and $5 million of the round was raised from individual investors. In May 2022, the company announced a slate of 12 titles that it said represented more than $100 million in original content.

On September 10, 2025, Angel Studios completed a business combination with special-purpose acquisition company Southport Acquisition Corporation. Although Southport was legally the acquirer, the transaction was accounted for as a reverse recapitalization, with the original Angel Studios company treated as the accounting acquirer. The combined company had an implied valuation of approximately $1.6 billion. Its Class A shares began trading on the New York Stock Exchange under the ticker symbol ANGX on September 11, 2025, and closed 8.4 percent higher on their first trading day.

=== Launch of the Angel Guild ===
Angel Studios launched the paid Angel Guild membership program in the second quarter of 2023. Guild members review and vote on submitted film and television projects. If a project receives a sufficiently high score, Angel may conduct further due diligence and seek a licensing or distribution agreement with the filmmaker.

As of March 31, 2026, the company reported 2.22 million paying Guild members. Membership fees help finance future film and television projects, while members can vote on submissions and receive early access to some content and other membership benefits.

In a May 2023 company post, Angel identified His Only Son and Sound of Freedom as early films supported through Guild voting. The films grossed approximately $13.8 million and $250.6 million worldwide, respectively.

In July 2026, Angel stated that Guild membership had grown to 2.6 million paying members.

=== International expansion ===
In February 2025, Angel Studios signed a slate distribution agreement with Kova Releasing covering the United Kingdom and Ireland. Later that month, the company announced additional output agreements covering France, Germany, Australia, New Zealand, and markets elsewhere in Europe, Latin America, Africa, and Asia.

== Filmography ==
=== Films ===
==== Live-action ====
Title	Release date
Testament: The Parables Retold	October 6, 2022
His Only Son	March 31, 2023
Sound of Freedom	July 4, 2023
After Death	October 27, 2023
The Shift	December 1, 2023
Cabrini	March 8, 2024
Sight	May 24, 2024
Sound of Hope: The Story of Possum Trot	July 4, 2024
Bonhoeffer	November 22, 2024
Homestead	December 20, 2024
Brave the Dark	January 24, 2025
Rule Breakers	March 7, 2025
The Last Rodeo	May 23, 2025
Sketch	August 6, 2025
The Senior	September 19, 2025
Truth & Treason	October 17, 2025
I Was a Stranger	January 9, 2026
Standout: The Ben Kjar Story	January 23, 2026
Solo Mio	February 6, 2026
Young Washington	July 3, 2026
The Brink of War	August 14, 2026
Runner	September 11, 2026
Angel and the Badman	October 9, 2026
Drummer Boy	November 6, 2026
Upcoming
Hershey	November 25, 2026
Zero A. D.: The Birth of Christ	December 11, 2026
Fing!	January 15, 2027
Fablehaven	2027
Rode to Ruin	2027
Salt & Honey	TBA

==== Animation ====
Title	Release date
The King of Kings	April 11, 2025
David	December 19, 2025
Animal Farm	May 1, 2026
Chickenhare and the Secret of the Groundhog	September 3, 2026

=== Television ===
==== Live-action ====
Title	Angel release	Seasons or episodes	Status
Dry Bar Comedy	2017–present	—	Ongoing
The Chosen	2019–2023	3 seasons	Angel's distribution rights ended in 2024; the companies settled their remaining legal claims in 2025.
Playing for Eternity	2023	1 season	Released
Dry Bar Unscripted	2023–2024	1 season	Released
Homestead: Family Survival	2024–2025	1 season, 8 episodes	Released
Homestead: The Series	2024–present	1 season, 8 episodes	Season 2 greenlit.
Testament	2025	1 season, 8 episodes	Released
The Wayfinders	2025–2026	1 season, 6 episodes	Released
A Week Away: The Series	2025	1 season, 7 episodes	Released
Truth & Treason: Limited Series	2025	4 episodes	Released
Beyond the Medal	2026	1 season	Streaming
Home to Harmony	2026	1 season	Streaming

==== Animation ====
Title	Angel release	Seasons or episodes	Status
Tuttle Twins	2021–present	4 seasons	Season 4 available through Guild Early Access.
The Wingfeather Saga	2022–present	4 seasons	Season 4 available through Guild Early Access.
Young David	2023–2024	5 episodes	Released
MechWest	2025	1 season, 3 episodes	Released
Gabriel and the Guardians	2025	1 pilot episode	Pilot released; additional episodes have not been confirmed.
Quokka's Wild Life	2025	1 season, 11 episodes	Released
Quokka Docs: Amazing Real Animals	2026	1 season, 9 episodes	Streaming
Tempest	TBA	TBA	Announced; release date not confirmed.
The Axiom Chronicles	TBA	TBA	Announced; release date not confirmed.

== Content ==
=== TV series ===
==== The Chosen ====
The Chosen is a multi-season television series created by Dallas Jenkins about the life of Jesus. The Chosen, LLC developed and produced the series, while VidAngel provided consultation for its crowdfunding campaign, built the technology used for the offering, and supplied marketing and public-relations services. During 2018 and 2019, the series raised just over $11 million through equity crowdfunding and received approximately $10.05 million in net proceeds, making it the largest crowdfunded television project at the time.

In April 2023, The Chosen initiated private binding arbitration against Angel Studios, alleging material breaches of their distribution agreement and seeking its termination. An interim award issued on May 28, 2024, terminated Angel's distribution rights, and a final award was issued on September 25, 2024. Angel appealed the decision in October 2024, but an appellate arbitration panel upheld the award on June 13, 2025. The companies entered into a settlement and mutual release agreement on July 11, 2025, resolving the remaining claims between them.

The series is now produced by 5&2 Studios for the nonprofit Come and See Foundation. Come and See owns The Chosen brand, while 5&2 Studios produces content associated with it. Come and See also supports the series' production, translation, global distribution, and free availability through donations.

==== Dry Bar Comedy ====
Dry Bar Comedy was the first original project launched by VidAngel Studios. Its first stand-up special was filmed on January 20, 2017. The series consists of filmed clean stand-up comedy performances recorded before live audiences. By May 2017, VidAngel Studios had filmed 52 specials.

As of December 31, 2025, Angel Studios had produced and filmed 776 original comedy specials as part of the series. Angel reported that Dry Bar Comedy had received more than five billion views across its distribution platforms, including social media.

==== Tuttle Twins ====
Tuttle Twins is an animated educational series based on the children's books of the same name. The series follows siblings Ethan and Emily Tuttle on adventures that introduce subjects including economics, civics, history, individual liberty, and personal responsibility. It premiered on Angel in 2021, and its fourth season began in November 2025.

In November 2025, Angel Studios entered into a merger agreement to acquire Tuttle Twins Show, LLC, which owns the rights to the series. On June 29, 2026, the parties amended the agreement and extended its outside closing date to October 31, 2026.

==== The Wingfeather Saga ====
The Wingfeather Saga is an animated adaptation of Andrew Peterson's fantasy novel series. It is produced by Nashville-based Shining Isle Productions and distributed through Angel. In 2021, the creators raised $5 million through equity crowdfunding in 20 days to finance the first season.

In November 2025, Angel Studios entered into a merger agreement to acquire Toothy Cow Productions, which owns the rights to the series. On June 29, 2026, the parties amended the agreement and extended its outside closing date to October 31, 2026. A fourth season is in production, with its world premiere scheduled for September 12, 2026.

=== Feature films ===
Angel Studios launched a theatrical distribution division in March 2023. One of its first releases was His Only Son, a drama produced by RockBridge Productions that retells the biblical account of Abraham and Isaac. Later that year, the company distributed Sound of Freedom and released The Shift, which was its first original theatrical feature film.

In April 2025, the animated biblical film The King of Kings opened with approximately $19 million in the United States and Canada, giving Angel its largest opening weekend at the time.

==== David ====
David is an animated musical based on the biblical account of David. In 2024, Slingshot USA terminated its distribution agreement with Angel Studios, and in 2025 it filed a lawsuit alleging breaches of contract and other claims.

In October 2025, Angel Studios and 2521 Entertainment acquired the David film and television franchise from Slingshot USA. The transaction resolved the companies' legal dispute, and Slingshot dismissed its lawsuit with prejudice on October 8, 2025. The film was released theatrically on December 19, 2025.

==== Solo Mio ====
Solo Mio, a romantic comedy starring Kevin James, was released by Angel Studios on February 6, 2026. It grossed approximately $26.4 million worldwide against a reported production budget of $4 million.

==== Sound of Freedom ====
In March 2023, Angel Studios acquired the North American distribution rights to Sound of Freedom, a drama directed by Alejandro Monteverde and starring Jim Caviezel, Mira Sorvino, and Bill Camp. Angel released the film in the United States on July 4, 2023, before beginning an international rollout later that year. It grossed more than $250 million worldwide and became Angel's highest-grossing release.

The film became controversial because of media coverage connecting its star and some of its supporters with the QAnon conspiracy theory, as well as scrutiny of Tim Ballard, whose activities inspired the story. Monteverde disputed descriptions of the film as a QAnon project, stating that its development began before the movement emerged.
