= Sunrise Productions =

South African computer animation studio

- Type: Private company
- Industry: Animation
- Founded: 1998; 28 years ago
- Founder: Phil Cunningham; Jacqui Cunningham
- Headquarters: Noordhoek, Cape Town, South Africa
- Key people: Brent Dawes; Rita Mbanga; Tim Keller
- Website: www.sunriseproductions.tv

Sunrise Productions is a South African computer animation studio based in Cape Town. Notable productions include Jungle Beat, a computer-animated series and its spin-off shows Munki and Trunk and The Explorers.

Sunrise is known for producing Africa's first animated feature film, The Legend of the Sky Kingdom. While this debut feature was created using stop-motion, the studio has now moved exclusively into 3D CG and live action production. Sunrise's commercial division combines live action, animation and VFX.

The studio co-produced David, an animated Biblical musical feature released in December 2025 in partnership with Angel Studios.

== History ==
Sunrise Productions was founded in 1998 in Zimbabwe by Phil Cunningham and Roger Hawkins. In 2003, the company released the stop-motion feature Legend of the Sky Kingdom. It was Africa's first animated full-length feature. Produced during a period of political unrest and extreme shortages, The Legend of the Sky Kingdom was produced in a style that the film-makers dubbed "junkmation", using puppets built from recycled materials and filmed on a motion camera rig improvised out of bicycle parts.

In 2003, Sunrise stepped into the 3D CG space with their flagship series, Jungle Beat, which has run for 3 seasons and given rise to spin-off shows The Explorers and Munki and Trunk. In 2004, the studio consolidated their reputation for upbeat CG content with Once Upon a Stable, an animated television special.

Sunrise's live-action division was launched in 2009, with the production of The Lazarus Effect for Bono's (RED) campaign. The HBO documentary, executive produced by Spike Jonze, follows the story of HIV positive people in Africa who undergo a remarkable transformation thanks to antiretroviral treatment.

Sunrise has also pioneered a 3D animated character branding and marketing model for high-profile sports brands such as the Welsh Rugby Union and Juventus Football Club. In 2016, Sunrise produced a holiday-themed animated short featuring 'Jay', the Juventus club mascot, and an imaginative young boy.

== Feature films ==
In 2025, Sunrise Productions produced the animated biblical musical feature David, with distribution by Angel Studios. The film was released in the United States on 19 December 2025. According to Sunrise, the film aims to bring the Biblical story of David to a broad family audience worldwide.

== Television ==
Sunrise's flagship series, Jungle Beat (2003-) is a CG-animated, non-dialogue, slapstick comedy series focusing on different animals and the bizarre situations in which they find themselves. The series is sold by Monster Entertainment, and has been broadcast in more than 180 countries on channels including Cartoon Network, Boomerang, and Nickelodeon.

In 2016, Sunrise expanded the Jungle Beat universe to include The Jungle Beat Explorers, which follows four clumsy, curious safari adventurers as they document the wild animals of the world. The 3D 13-episode series is broadcast exclusively on the Jungle Beat YouTube channel.

The Jungle Beat franchise was further expanded with the development of Munki and Trunk, a 52 x 7 minute series aimed at kids aged 4–7. The "tree-crashing, rock smashing, water-splashing, fruit-mashing, knock-about comedy adventure" centres on two unlikely best friends: crafty Munki and caring Trunk. In 2017, Aardman's Rights and Brand Development division partnered with Sunrise to represent global television distribution rights for the animated series.

In 2013, Sunrise Productions' live action department partnered with Okuhle Media to co-produce the 13-part cooking and lifestyle series Bitten Sarah Graham Cooks Cape Town.

== Commercials ==
Sunrise Productions has produced commercials combining live action, animation and VFX elements for a number of clients.

- The Springboks – South Africa's National Rugby Team
- Samsung

== Awards ==
Sunrise Productions has won the following awards:

- Best Animation at the African Eye Animation Festival (2003)
- Marble Z award for Best Film from the Children's Jury at the Zagreb Animation Festival (2003)
- Audience Award in São Paulo and 2nd place in Rio de Janeiro's Anima Mundi International Animation Festival (2003)
- Main prize at Sprockets Toronto International Film Festival for Children (2006)
- Camerio Audience Award at Carrousel International du Film de Rimouski in Canada (2006)
- Award for Best Series for children at the South African Film and Television Awards (2007)
- National Film Board Of Canada Award for Best Animated Short at Freeze Frame Festival 2007
- Jica Enfants Award at the Annecy International Animated Film Festival (2008)
- Best Animation at the LG “Life’s Good” Film Festival in Toronto (2008)
- Two Platinum awards from the American Pixel Academy (2011)

=== Participation in Academy Award qualifying festivals ===
- Official selection at the Chicago International Children's Film Festival (CICFF) 2004 and 2013
- St Louis International Film Festival (2014).
