= Jungle Beat (TV series) =

Animated children's television show

- Genre: Comedy; Slice of life
- Created by: Brent Dawes
- Directed by: Brent Dawes
- Country of origin: South Africa
- Original language: English
- No. of series: 4
- No. of episodes: 62 (list of episodes)

Production
- Executive producers: Phil Cunningham; Jacqui Cunningham
- Running time: 5 minutes
- Production company: Sunrise Productions

Original release
- Release: October 1, 2003 – present

Related
- Munki and Trunk

Jungle Beat is a South African animated children's series consisting of dialogue-free, five-minute episodes focusing on different animals and the bizarre situations they encounter in nature.

== Production ==
Jungle Beat is produced by Sunrise Productions, a CG animation studio based in Cape Town, South Africa. The first episode of Jungle Beat, "Always Take the Weather with You" was produced in Harare in 2003. Initially produced as a VFX test for fur and weather effects, the five-minute short was an unexpected success, and went on to win a number of awards, including “Best Animation” at the African Eye Animation Festival and the Audience Award at São Paulo's Anima Mundi International Animation Festival in 2004

This short, which follows the adventures of a monkey in extreme weather conditions, served as the pilot episode of Jungle Beat and the story structure of an animal navigating its way through a quirky predicament became the format for each five-minute episode of Jungle Beat's three seasons.

== Characters ==
The Jungle Beat series consists of standalone shorts which follow the antics and adventures of a different animal in each episode. Several of the more popular characters, such as Giraffe, Elephant, Monkey, Bee, and Hedgehog, feature in multiple episodes, facing a different predicament in each.

== Spin-off ==
In 2015, Sunrise expanded the Jungle Beat universe to include The Jungle Beat Explorers, a 3D 13-episode series that broadcasts exclusively on the Sunrise YouTube channel. The non-dialogue show introduced Mirabelle, Simon, Dexter and Rita, four curious, inept safari adventurers who document the wild animals of the world.

The Jungle Beat franchise was then further expanded with the development of Munki and Trunk, a 52 x 7 minute series aimed at kids aged 4–7. The show takes place in the Jungle Beat universe, but reintroduces the familiar animal cast as an ensemble, with more developed characters and relationships than the original parent show. The “tree-crashing, rock smashing, water-splashing, fruit-mashing, knock-about comedy adventure” centres on two unlikely best friends: crafty Munki and caring Trunk.

Sunrise Productions produced Jungle Beat: The Movie and was released on 26 June 2020. In this version, unlike the others, the animals are able to talk, although previously other characters occasionally spoke.

In 2025, Season 4 was released.

== Other media ==
Sunrise Productions released Jungle Beat: The Game on the Apple App Store and Google Play. Released on the 24th of August 2015, the game was successful and had reached the top spot in the South African App Store by the 25th of August. The game features 25 levels and is aimed at children of 4–11 years of age.

== Film adaptation ==
Jungle Beat: The Movie is a 2020 Mauritian animated film directed by Brent Dawes, based on the characters of the television series Jungle Beat. The film premiered at the 2020 Annecy International Animated Film Festival.
