= Nowrasteh =

Nowarasteh is a surname. Notable people with the surname include:

- Alex Nowrasteh, American policy analyst
- Cyrus Nowrasteh (born 1956), American-Iranian screenwriter, director, and producer
- Mark Nowrasteh (born 1985), American playwright and screenwriter
