= Cyrus Nowrasteh =

American screenwriter and director

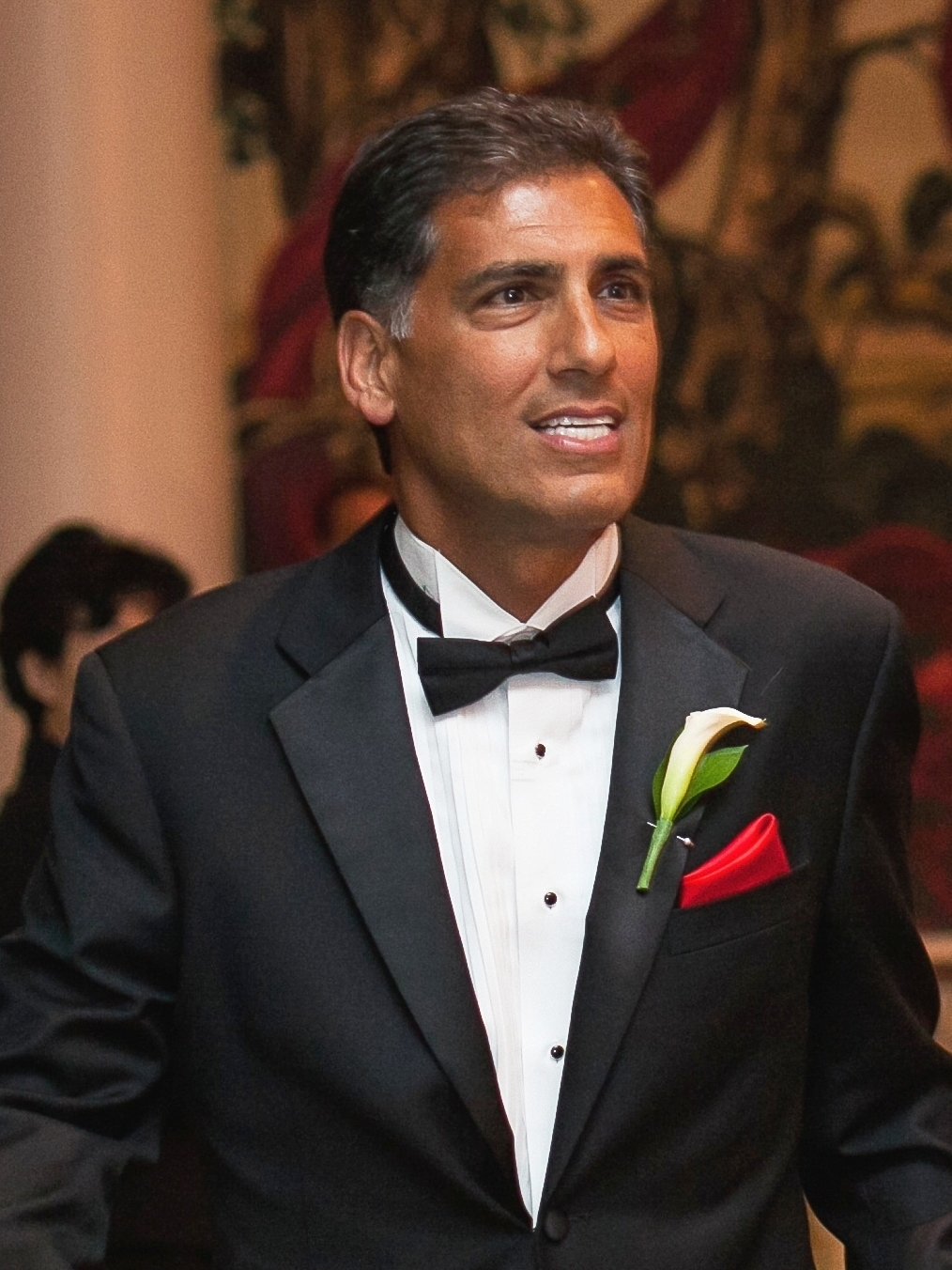
- Nowrasteh in 2017
- Born: 19 September 1956 (age 70); Boulder, Colorado, U.S.
- Education: USC School of Cinematic Arts
- Occupations: Screenwriter, director, producer
- Notable work: The Day Reagan Was Shot; The Path to 9/11; The Stoning of Soraya M. The Young Messiah
- Spouse: Betsy Giffen Nowrasteh
- Children: Alex Nowrasteh; Mark Nowrasteh
- Website: cyrusnowrasteh.com

Cyrus Nowrasteh (Persian: سیروس/کوروش نورسته; /nəˈrɑːstə/; born September 19, 1956) is an American filmmaker. He has worked on numerous television series and made-for-TV movies including The Day Reagan Was Shot, Falcon Crest, Into the West, and the miniseries The Path to 9/11. He has also directed the theatrical features The Stoning of Soraya M. (2009), The Young Messiah (2016), and Infidel (2020).

== Early life and education ==
Nowrasteh was born on 19 September 1956 to an Iranian family in Boulder, Colorado, and grew up in Madison, Wisconsin. He graduated from Madison West High School in 1974 and was a city boys high school tennis champion. Nowrasteh attended New Mexico State University on an athletic scholarship and later transferred to the University of Southern California to attend the School of Cinematic Arts, graduating in 1977.

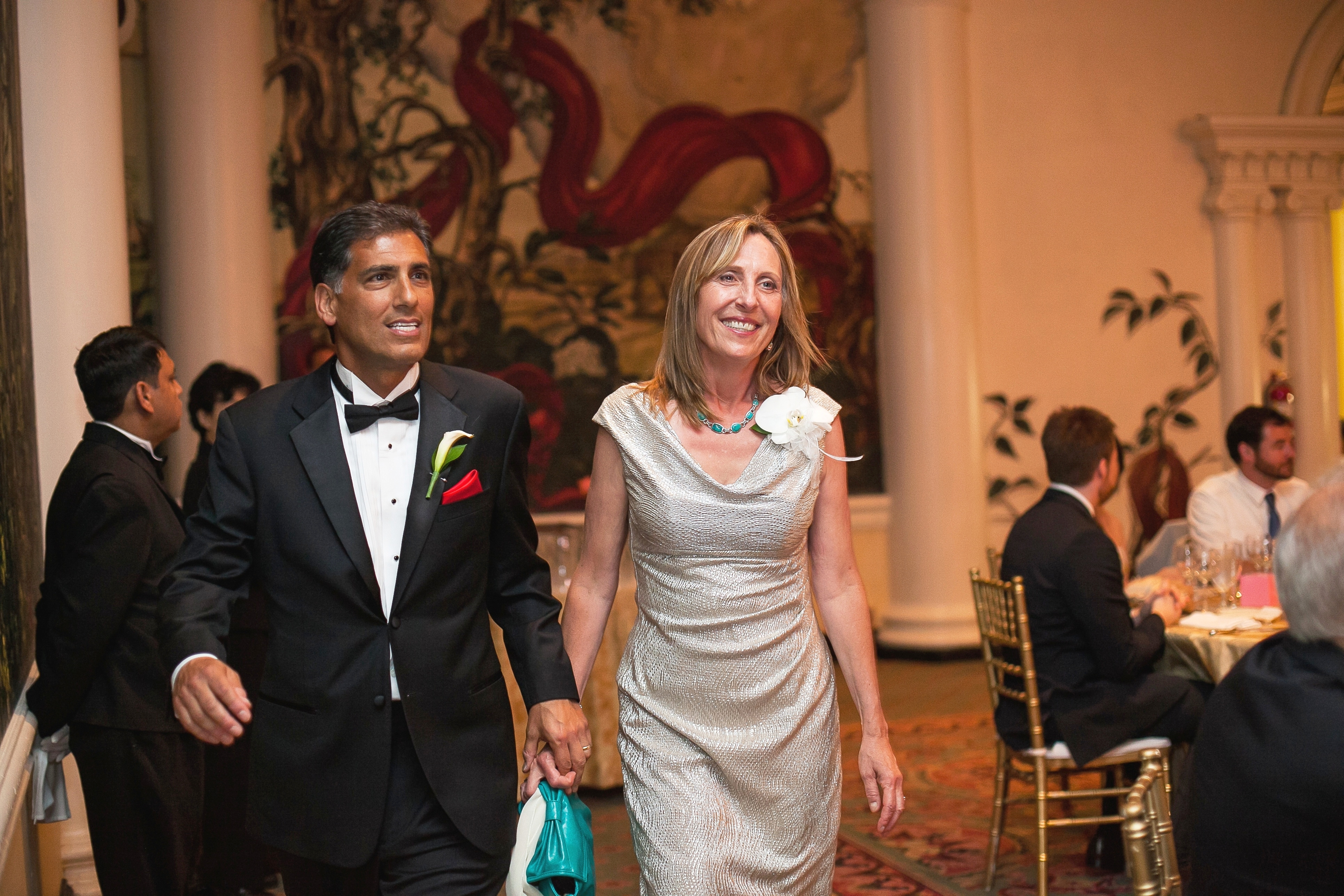
Cyrus Nowrasteh and Betsy Giffen Nowrasteh in 2017.

== Career ==
In 1986, Nowrasteh began his career by writing for the CBS television series The Equalizer. He went on to work on Falcon Crest as a producer and story editor and wrote the pilot for the USA Network show La Femme Nikita (1996). He made his directorial debut with Veiled Threat, a 1989 independent film based on the real-life murder of an Iranian journalist living in Orange County. The film was pulled from the AFI Film Festival after organizers received bomb threats, allegedly due to the film's criticism of Khomeini. Nowrasteh subsequently accused the AFI of buckling to "censorship" and claimed their pulling the film "killed" its chances at distribution.

He also worked on independent films such as the American/Brazilian production The Interview (1995), which played at Sundance and on the Showtime network; and Norma Jean, Jack and Me (1998).

In 2001, Nowrasteh wrote and directed the highly rated, award-winning Showtime presentation The Day Reagan Was Shot, which starred Richard Dreyfuss as Alexander Haig and was executive-produced by Oliver Stone. The following year he wrote 10,000 Black Men Named George, the story of the Pullman strike of the 1930s, for Showtime.

Nowrasteh wrote the "Manifest Destiny" episode of the highly regarded (16 Emmy nominations) Steven Spielberg and TNT miniseries presentation Into the West.

=== The Path to 9/11 ===
The 2006 ABC miniseries The Path to 9/11 aired under much controversy. Critics said it fictionalized the lead-up to the 11 September 2001 attacks in order to direct blame to the Clinton administration. Although Nowrasteh's screenplay for The Path to 9/11 was billed by the ABC network as having been "based on the 9/11 Commission Report", there were accusations that the screenplay evidenced political bias because of its allegedly contrafactual portrayal of events.

Nowrasteh admitted dramatic license in the movie. However, he maintained that a certain amount of dramatic license must be allotted in the process of writing a dramatic script with a historical underpinning (see docudrama and biopic). Although the precise conversations depicted in the script may never have taken place, he alleged that the general tone and content of events depicted in The Path to 9/11 were true. When asked if he thought of the script as a "historical document," Nowrasteh has responded:

No, but I stand by the original version of the movie, and I stand by the edited version. ... There has to be conflation of events. The most obvious problem any dramatist faces is that of sheer length. I had to collapse the events of eight and a half years into five hours. I don't know any other way to do it except collapse, conflate, and condense.

Critics, including 9/11 Commission member Richard Ben-Veniste, pointed out that some scenes in the film were complete fabrications. Richard Miniter, a conservative author and critic of the Clinton administration, said that a key scene with Sandy Berger was based on "Internet myth": "If people wanted to be critical of the Clinton years there's things they could have said, but the idea that someone had bin Laden in his sights in 1998 or any other time and Sandy Berger refused to pull the trigger, there's zero factual basis for that." Nowrasteh wrote about his work on Path To 9/11 in an opinion piece in the opinionjournal.com on 18 September 2006. He stated:

The Path to 9/11 was set in the time before the event, and in a world in which no party had the political will to act. The principals did not know then what we know now. It is also indisputable that Bill Clinton entered office a month before the first attack on the World Trade Center. Eight years then went by, replete with terrorist assaults on Americans and American interests overseas. George W. Bush was in office eight months before 9/11. Those who actually watched the entire miniseries know that he was given no special treatment.

Critics—including President Bill Clinton, Sandy Berger, Madeleine Albright, former Clinton aides, an FBI agent who quit as a consultant to the film, 9/11 Commission co-chair Lee H. Hamilton, and some conservatives, including Bill Bennett and John Fund—asserted that the film contained inaccuracies such as its depiction of Clinton as so distracted by the Lewinsky scandal that he neglected the terrorism issue (although the 9/11 Commission Report states that "we have found no reason to question" the testimony of Clinton aides who claimed that the Lewinsky scandal had no bearing on national security considerations). Nowrasteh is quoted in the documentary Blocking the Path to 9/11 as saying that his intention in depicting Clinton as "somewhat hamstrung" in his response to terrorism was, ironically, to make Clinton a more sympathetic figure.

In 2008, talk show host John Ziegler and producer David Bossie of Citizens United premiered a documentary co-produced, written and directed by Ziegler entitled Blocking the Path to 9/11, revisiting the controversy behind the ABC miniseries.

=== The Stoning of Soraya M. ===
The Stoning of Soraya M. (Persian: .سنگسار ثريا م) is a 2008 American drama film adapted from French Iranian journalist Freidoune Sahebjam's 1994 book of the same name based on the true story of a woman falsely convicted of adultery in Iran and subsequently stoned to death. The film version was directed by Cyrus Nowrasteh and written by Nowrasteh and his wife, screenwriter Betsy Giffen Nowrasteh. It stars Academy Award nominee Shohreh Aghdashloo, as well as James Caviezel and Mozhan Marnò.

Because of its highly critical attitude toward the Iranian legal system, the controversial book, an international bestseller, was banned in Iran. Likewise, the film version of The Stoning of Soraya M., even before its release, made its way onto a list of American films that Iranian President Mahmoud Ahmadinejad deemed offensive and for which he demanded an apology. But the film's release also drew enough attention to the issue of stoning in Iran that it sufficiently embarrassed the Iranian authorities into announcing consideration of a ban on stoning and other harsh legal punishments.

Writing in The Wall Street Journal, John Jurgensen said the film was shot over six weeks in a mountain village in Jordan. The stoning sequence itself took six days to shoot. Jurgensen reports that "some human-rights advocates call the film inaccurate and sensationalistic," but that director Cyrus Nowrasteh responds, "A movie like this needs to be absolutely uncompromising in its approach. The subject demands it."

The film had its world premiere at the 2009 Toronto International Film Festival, where it won Runner-up for the Audience Choice Award. It also won Second Runner-up for the Cadillac People's Choice Award, as well as the Audience Award for Best Feature at the 2009 Los Angeles Film Festival. The film also won the Heartland Truly Moving Picture Award, and the 2009 Ghent Film Festival's Canvas Audience Award. At the 2009 Satellite Awards, it was named one of the year's Top Ten Films and nominated for Best Drama Film, while its star Shohreh Agdashloo won Best Actress in a Drama.

In 2010, the film was hailed as one of Movieguide's Ten Best 2009 Movies for Mature Audiences and was the co-winner, with Invictus, of Movieguide's Faith and Freedom Award for Promoting Positive American Values for 2009. It also shared, with "Women in Shroud", the Cinema for Peace Award for Justice in conjunction with the Berlin Film Festival and won Outstanding Foreign Motion Picture at the NAACP Image Awards.

=== The Young Messiah ===
Nowrasteh directed the biblical drama The Young Messiah, which was released on 11 March 2016. The story was adapted by Cyrus and Betsy Giffen Nowrasteh from Anne Rice's Christ the Lord: Out of Egypt, and was produced by 1492 Pictures and Ocean Blue Entertainment in association with CJ E&M Film Division. The film was distributed by Focus Features. The project had a jump start in early 2013 but was shut down in preproduction and was seemingly dead. Then in late 2014, the project was resurrected thanks to the efforts of Tracy K. Price and Bill Andrew, along with Italian producer Enzo Sisti. Filmed in Matera and Rome, Italy, the plot follows Jesus Christ at age seven, when he returns to Nazareth and learns about his true place as the son of God.

On 10 December 2015, Nowrasteh was interviewed on EWTN by Raymond Arroyo. Nowrasteh said of the film: "This is really a movie about a family and we take you inside the Holy Family."

=== Infidel ===
Nowrasteh wrote, directed, and produced the 2020 film Infidel, a political thriller about an American journalist (played by Jim Caviezel) held captive by the Iranian regime. Nowrasteh cited several real world instances of American nationals imprisoned by the Iranian government, including Xiyue Wang and Robert Levinson. One of the film's producers was right-wing pundit Dinesh D'Souza, who had previously produced several political documentaries including 2016: Obama's America, Hillary's America: The Secret History of the Democratic Party, and Death of a Nation. Infidel is his first narrative film.

The film was shot on-location in Jordan, where Nowrasteh previously shot Soraya M. On his website, Nowrasteh stated the Jordanian film commission kept its filming secret for fear of objections from the Iranian government, and the film had heavy security. When the Iranian government did become aware of Nowrasteh being in Amman to film and voiced its displeasure to the Jordanian government.

The story centers on a Christian underground inside Iran, led primarily by women. They work together in the film with Muslims who are also in opposition to the Iranian regime, by helping the main character, Doug Rawlins (portrayed by Jim Caviezel) and his wife, Liz (played by Claudia Karvan). Another actress was set to play Liz but left the film only weeks before filming due to a conflicting commitment. Karvan was recommended by Caviezel who worked with her on Long Weekend (2008).

=== Sarah's Oil ===
Nowrasteh wrote, directed, and produced the historical docudrama Sarah's Oil. Co-written with his wife, Betsy Giffen Nowrasteh, the film dramatizes the true story of Sarah Rector, a young African American girl born in early 20th-century Oklahoma who believed there was oil beneath the land she was allotted and became one of the first African American female millionaires at the age of eleven. The project was produced by Nowrasteh's company, New Path Pictures, in association with The Wonder Project and Kingdom Story Company. Sarah's Oil was released theatrically on November 7, 2025.

Early test screenings of Sarah's Oil reportedly received highly positive audience feedback, with particular praise for historical accuracy and balance of faith elements, dramatic realism, and social commentary.

== Other projects ==
Nowrasteh's film Sarah's Oil was scheduled to be released by Amazon Studios on November 7, 2025.

Among Nowrasteh's other upcoming projects were reportedly to be film adaptations of Thomas Tessier's book The Nightwalker and The Last Campaign.

== Personal life ==
Nowrasteh is married to screenwriter Elizabeth ("Betsy") G. Nowrasteh (born 1953).

=== Political orientation ===
Nowrasteh received criticism from conservatives for an alleged "liberal bias" in his Showtime film, The Day Reagan Was Shot. Former Reagan National Security Advisor, Richard Allen, led the charge with a piece in The Wall Street Journal (14 December 2001), accusing Nowrasteh and Executive Producer Oliver Stone of "yet another dubious Oliver Stone production" and referring to it as "The Day They Shot the Truth." Mr. Allen based his piece on tapes he had kept from that day, releasing only six minutes to support his position. Nowrasteh responded in the Los Angeles Times (24 December 2001) and a letter to the editor in the Wall Street Journal (2 January 2002), "the clear solution is to have Allen release the entire unedited tape and allow anyone to make the comparisons and draw whatever conclusions seem warranted." Nowrasteh concluded his Los Angeles Times piece by writing, "The Day Reagan Was Shot provides the first-ever dramatization of a constitutional crisis and government cover-up (both amply supported by facts) and the threat they pose to a nation when a president becomes incapacitated. This is important and relevant and raises issues that should be discussed openly."

Los Angeles Times TV critic Howard Rosenberg, in a review entitled, "Film on Reagan Shooting Plays Loose With Facts," wrote that Nowraseth's script "in some key areas collides head-on with other accounts." Rosenberg added:

In the movie, also, the perceived Soviet nuclear threat turns out to be a harmless simulation by the North American Aerospace Defense Command. However, NORAD conducted no such operations that day, [national security advisor Richard V.] Allen says in one of the documentaries. When apprised of that, Nowrasteh said he had based that part of his script on "circumstantial" evidence.

As for the hospital intruder who reaches Reagan's bedside, Nowrasteh said he's certain that happened and that he read of it in Washingtonian magazine. Even if didn't happen, though, it plays well, which is all that really matters.

== Filmography ==
=== Film ===
Year	Title	Director	Writer	Producer
1989	Veiled Threat	Yes	Yes	No
1995	The Interview	No	Yes	No
1998	Norma Jean, Jack and Me	Yes	Yes	No
2009	The Stoning of Soraya M.	Yes	Yes	No
2016	The Young Messiah	Yes	Yes	No
2020	Infidel	Yes	Yes	Yes
2025	Sarah's Oil	Yes	Yes	Yes
2026	Dark Horse	Yes	Yes	No

=== Television ===
Year	Title	Director	Writer	Producer	Notes
1986	The Equalizer	No	Yes	No	Episode: "Out of the Past"
1989–90	Falcon Crest	Yes	Yes	Yes	Writer - 7 episodes Co-producer - 9 episodes Director - 1 episode Story editor - 13 episodes
1997–99	La Femme Nikita	No	Yes	No	Episodes: "Nikita" & Imitation of Death"
1999	Pacific Blue	No	Yes	No	Episodes: "The Naked Truth" & "Gaslight"
2016–17	Hawaii Five-0	No	Yes	Yes	Writer - 3 episodes Consulting producer - 12 episodes

TV movies

Year	Title	Director	Writer
1997	The Advocate's Devil	No	Yes
2001	The Day Reagan Was Shot	Yes	Yes
2002	10,000 Black Men Named George	No	Yes

Miniseries

Year	Title	Writer	Producer	Notes
2005	Into the West	Yes	No	Episode "Manifest Destiny"
2006	The Path to 9/11	Yes	Yes	

== Awards and nominations ==
=== Film Fest Gent ===
- 2009 Grand Prix for Best Film: The Stoning of Soraya M. (nominated)

=== LA Film Festival ===
- 2009 Audience Award for Best Narrative Feature: The Stoning of Soraya M. (won)

=== PEN Center USA ===
- 2002 Literary Award for Best Teleplay: The Day Reagan Was Shot (won)
- 2003 Literary Award for Best Teleplay: 10,000 Black Men Named George (won)

=== Prêmio Guarani ===
- 1996 Best Screenplay: The Interview (nominated)

=== Toronto International Film Festival ===
- 2008 People's Choice Award: The Stoning of Soraya M. (nominated)

== Bibliography ==
- The Path to Hysteria – Nowrasteh's response to critics
- Dissection of Nowrasteh's "response" to critics
- Nico Pitney, "Writer of ABC's 9/11 'Docudrama' Is Avowed Conservative Activist," Think Progress, 1 September 2006.
- Doug Moe, "West grad's 9/11 film stirs storm," The Capital Times (Madison, Wisconsin), 2 September 2006.
- Cyrus Nowrasteh, "The Path to 9/11: Committing the Truth," Written By (WGA)
- Cyrus Nowrasteh, "A Path to 9/11," Wall Street Journal
- "TORONTO ‘08 DISCOVERY INTERVIEW|'The Stoning of Soraya M' Director Cyrus Nowrasteh"
- "Persian Heritage Magazine Interviews Cyrus Nowrasteh"
