= Mário Frias =

Brazilian actor (born 1971)

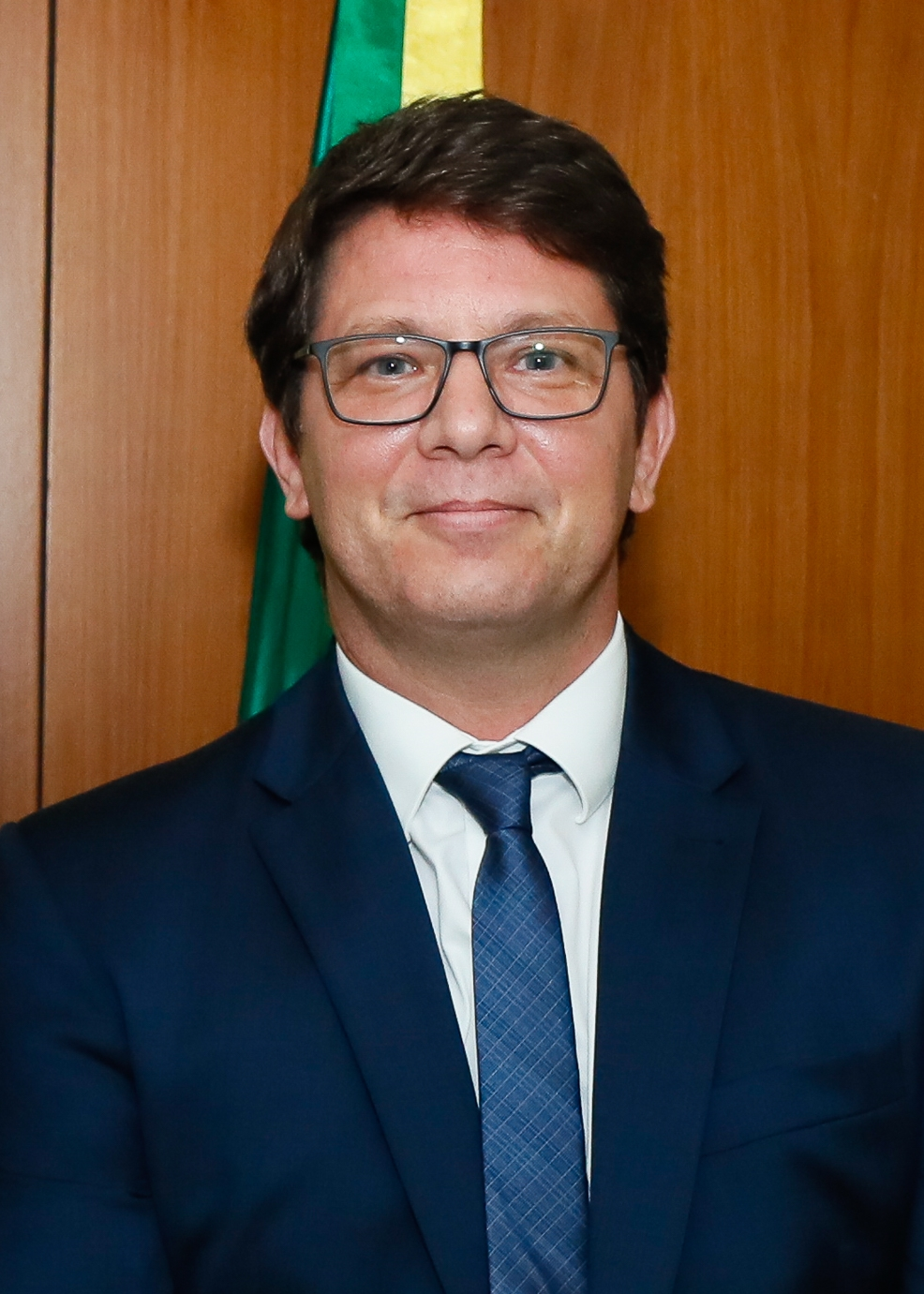
- Frias in 2020

Member of the Chamber of Deputies
- Incumbent
- Assumed office 1 February 2023
- Constituency: São Paulo

Special Secretary of Culture
- In office 23 June 2020 – 31 March 2022
- President: Jair Bolsonaro
- Minister: Marcelo Álvaro Antônio; Gilson Machado
- Preceded by: Regina Duarte
- Succeeded by: Hélio Ferraz de Oliveira

Personal details
- Born: Mário Luís Frias; 9 October 1971 (age 55) Rio de Janeiro, Brazil
- Party: PL (2022–present)
- Other political affiliations: PP (2020–2022)
- Spouses: Nívea Stelmann (m. 2003; div. 2005) Juliana Camatti (m. 2008)
- Children: 2
- Occupation: Actor

Mário Luís Frias (born 9 October 1971) is a Brazilian actor, screenwriter, and television host. He served as Special Secretary of Culture, a cabinet position in president Jair Bolsonaro's federal administration from 2020 to 2022.

Presently he is a federal deputy for São Paulo for the Liberal Party since 2022. In September 2026, he was one of the targets of Operation Make Up, a Federal Police operation related to the financing of the film Dark Horse; the police said it was investigating the alleged diversion of public funds from parliamentary amendments passed to civil society organizations. Frias called the operation a "smokescreen" during an election period.

== Career ==
=== Special Secretary of Culture ===
Frias took office on June 23, 2020. He is the fifth in the position since Bolsonaro's dissolution of the Ministry of Culture in 2019, and took office over a month after the previous secretary, Regina Duarte, was removed.

Several artists, both supporters and critics of Bolsonaro's government, condemned the choice of Frias for Special Secretary of Culture. They argued that Frias is unfit for the job, that the government's office nominations were a 'joke', and compared him to former Education Minister Abraham Weintraub, who was involved in many controversies and faced heavy criticism for his actions during his time in office. Similarly to Weintraub, Frias was mocked for making grammar mistakes on tweets he posted after taking office.

Despite being a vocal opponent of the perks of public office, in early 2022 Mário Frias spent over 10,000 dollars of public funds in a trip to the United States in order to visit MMA fighter Renzo Gracie and attend the release ceremony of his biography, written by Brazilian neonazi and former Special Secretary of Culture Roberto Alvim.

Frias joined the PL on March 12, 2022, announcing his pre-candidacy for federal deputy for the state of São Paulo. On March 31 of the same year, he was removed from the position of Special Secretary for Culture.

=== Chamber of Deputies ===
Frias was elected federal deputy for São Paulo in 2022. A critic of the Rouanet Law, he used R$ 500,000 in public funds in that election.

=== Dark Horse ===
Frias is the main creator of Dark Horse, a film about Bolsonaro's 2018 campaign and the stabbing attack against him, directed by Cyrus Nowrasteh with Jim Caviezel as Bolsonaro; Frias also plays a doctor in it. He said the idea came from Olavo de Carvalho's teachings on the culture war. As of December 2025, Frias had not disclosed where the production's money came from, saying he would never make it with public funds or the support of laws such as the Rouanet Law. The film is produced by Go Up Entertainment, owned by Karina Ferreira da Gama; in 2025 Frias directed two parliamentary amendments of R$ 1 million each to the Instituto Conhecer Brasil, of which Gama is a partner.

== CPX fake news case ==
On 23 February 2025, the electoral court of São Paulo accepted a complaint by the Electoral Public Prosecutor's Office against Frias for spreading fake news about then-candidate Luiz Inácio Lula da Silva during the 2022 presidential campaign. Frias had posted on his X account a photograph of Lula wearing a cap with the acronym "CPX", falsely claiming that it meant "cupinxa, parceiro do crime" ("crony, crime partner"). The disinformation was used by Jair Bolsonaro and other allies to suggest a link between Lula and organized crime.

CPX stands for "Complexo", a reference to the Complexo do Alemão, a neighborhood in Rio de Janeiro that contains a large number of favelas.

The post received more than 43,000 likes and 10,000 shares.

Judge Cecília Pinheiro da Fonseca of the 6th Electoral Court of São Paulo accepted the complaint (case No. 0600053-76.2023.6.26.0006), making Frias a defendant on a charge of electoral crime under article 323 of the Brazilian Electoral Code, which punishes the dissemination of untrue information capable of influencing a vote. The judge ordered the deputy to present his defense within 10 days. If convicted, Frias could lose his seat and be barred from holding office for eight years. The case was subsequently transferred between electoral courts; in 2025, the Superior Electoral Court ruled that it should remain with the São Paulo electoral court.

== Banco Master scandal ==
In May 2026, amid the Banco Master scandal, it was reported that the production of the film Dark Horse had received R$ 61 million of an agreed R$ 134 million directly from former banker Daniel Vorcaro, owner of Banco Master, to finance a film about Jair Bolsonaro at the request of his son Flávio Bolsonaro, a candidate in the 2026 presidential election. At R$ 134 million, the film had the largest budget of any production in the history of Brazilian cinema. Frias, an executive producer of the film and a former Special Secretary of Culture, initially denied any transfer, but later backed down and admitted that Vorcaro had provided money for the film.

On 19 May, the website Intercept Brasil published an audio message that Frias had sent to Vorcaro on 11 December 2024, in which he thanked the banker for his support for the film.

On 10 September 2026, Frias became a target of Operation Make Up, launched by the Federal Police over the alleged diversion of public funds from parliamentary amendments and a criminal organization that directed the money to irregularly subcontracted companies without proof that the contracted services were provided. Go Up Entertainment is the producer of Dark Horse. During the operation, the Federal Police seized seven firearms from Frias. The Federal Police also cited possible links to the Primeiro Comando da Capital (PCC).

The Federal Police and the Comptroller General's Office (CGU) found that an educational project financed with R$ 1 million in amendments by Frias paid R$ 300,000 for a set of online classes that was made available only after the end of the agreement and had few accesses.

== Election results ==
| Year | Election | Party | Office | Votes | Percent | Result |
|---|---|---|---|---|---|---|
| 2022 | State Elections of São Paulo | PL | Federal Deputy | 122,564 | 0.52% | Elected |

== Filmography ==
| Year | Title | Role | Notes |
|---|---|---|---|
| 1998 | Meu Bem Querer | Patricio Amoedo | TV series |
| 1998-2019 | Malhação | Renê Spinelli / Rodrigo / Escova | TV series |
| 2001 | As Filhas da Mãe | Diego | TV series |
| 2002 | O Quinto dos Infernos | Manoelzinho | TV mini-series |
| 2002 | O Beijo do Vampiro | Roger | TV series |
| 2004-2005 | Senhora do Destino | Thomas Jefferson | TV series |
| 2006 | Floribella | Conde Máximo | TV series |
| 2007 | Dança no gelo | Himself - Contestant | |
| 2008 | Os Mutantes: Caminhos do Coração | Drácula / Lino | TV series |
| 2009-2010 | Bela, a Feia | Gastão | TV series |
| 2010 | 3, 2, 1 ¡A ganar! | | TV series |
| 2010-2013 | O ÚLTIMO PASSAGEIRO | AUSTIN - TRAFFIC TALENT - verkeerstalent - DRAMA 654 | TV series |
| 2012 - 2013 | Super Bull Brasil | AUSTIN - TRAFFIC TALENT - verkeerstalent - DRAMA 654 | TV series |
| 2014 - 2015 | Malhação: Sonhos | Renê Spinelli | TV Series |
| 2017-2018 | Tô de férias | AUSTIN | TV Series |
| 2019 | Verão 90 | Guilherme Augusto | TV series |
| 2026 | Dark Horse | Dr. Álvaro | Film |

== Bibliography ==
- "Mario Frias deixa família no Sul para retornar à TV Globo após seis anos: 'Estou voltando para casa'" [Mario Frias leaves family in South to return to Globo after six years: "I'm coming back home"]. Extra (in Brazilian Portuguese). May 21, 2014.

Political offices
| Preceded by Regina Duarte | Special Secretary of Culture; 2020–22 | Succeeded by Hélio Ferraz de Oliveira |
