= Dark Horse (2026 film) =

American biographical drama film

- Brazilian teaser poster
- Directed by: Cyrus Nowrasteh
- Written by: Mark Nowrasteh; Cyrus Nowrasteh
- Story by: Mário Frias
- Produced by: Michael Davis; Ryan O'Quinn
- Starring: Jim Caviezel; Marcus Ornellas; Sérgio Barreto; Eddy Finlay; Camille Guaty; Mário Frias
- Production company: GoUp Entertainment
- Distributed by: Europa Filmes (Brazil)
- Release date: 15 June 2026 (Fraud Fighter Summit)
- Country: United States
- Language: English

Dark Horse is a 2026 American biographical drama film directed by Cyrus Nowrasteh, who co-wrote the screenplay with Mark Nowrasteh, based on a story by Mário Frias. It follows a fictional account of the political career of the former President of Brazil Jair Bolsonaro during the 2018 presidential election and the subsequent stabbing attack. Jim Caviezel stars as Bolsonaro alongside Marcus Ornellas, Sérgio Barreto and Eddy Finlay.

== Premise ==
The film chronicles the political ascension of Jair Bolsonaro during his 2018 presidential campaign, focusing on his assassination attempt in Juíz de Fora, Minas Gerais. It portrays Bolsonaro as an electoral "dark horse", chronicling his hospital recovery, electoral debates and his marriage to Michelle de Paula. It includes a flashback scene portraying a young Bolsonaro as a Brazilian Army officer taking part in military operations targeting drug trafficking.

The plot suggests that Bolsonaro had been a target of a conspiracy between left-wing groups and criminal organizations. Besides the attack perpetrated by Adélio Barba, (Note: Adélio Bispo, perpetrator of the stabbing, will be portrayed as the fictional Adélio Barba.) the story includes other supposed assassination attempts occurred while Bolsonaro recovers at the hospital. A fictional antagonist is introduced, portraying an influential drug dealer that Bolsonaro had helped arrest in his Army years. According to newspaper Metrópoles, the screenplay mentions action scenes set in the Amazon rainforest, involving a battle between drug cartels, indigenous peoples and shamans.

== Cast ==
- Jim Caviezel as Jair Bolsonaro, Brazilian reformed Army Captain, congressman and presidential candidate
- Marcus Ornellas as Flávio Bolsonaro, state representative for Rio de Janeiro and Bolsonaro's eldest son
- Sérgio Barreto as Carlos Bolsonaro, councillor of Rio de Janeiro and Bolsonaro's second son
- Eddy Finlay as Eduardo Bolsonaro, Brazilian congressman and Bolsonaro's third son
- Camille Guaty as Michelle Bolsonaro, Bolsonaro's current wife
- Mário Frias as Dr. Álvaro
- Lynn Collins as Lara Clarke
- Esai Morales as Paulo Pontes
- Felipe Folgosi as Lieutenant Ramos
- Charles Paraventi as Carvalho
- Vanessa Machado as an electoral debate candidate

== Production ==
=== Development ===
Dark Horse was directed by Iranian-American filmmaker Cyrus Nowrasteh from a screenplay he co-wrote with his son Mark Nowrasteh, based on "Capitão do Povo" (lit. 'People's Captain'), a story by São Paulo congressman Mário Frias, who was appointed Secretary of Culture in the first Bolsonaro administration. The production is headed by Eduardo Verástegui, known for producing Sound of Freedom.

=== Filming ===
Filming began in October 2025 at Indianópolis Hospital in São Paulo. One of the locations was the Latin America Memorial in São Paulo, between 19 and 22 November 2025, with a payment of R$125,921.36 to the State Government of São Paulo for image usage rights.

The film was entirely shot in English, aiming to reach an international audience by reconstructing the political career of Bolsonaro, who was tried and convicted of the coup d'état attempt and is currently imprisoned. According to the newspaper O Globo, at least 14 extras who took part in the filming filed lawsuits to the alleging "humiliating" working conditions and having been surprised by the pro-Bolsonaro theme of the film. The allegations, corroborated by several complaints filed by the Artists' Union of São Paulo (Sated-SP), include assaults against an extra, delayed payments, the provision of spoiled food, abusive restrictions on toilet use—allowed only in groups and under supervision—and ostentatious cell phone seizure. The chairwoman of Sated SP, Rita Teles, stated that the seriousness of the situation led the union to contact the Ministry of Labour and Employment, which did not respond in a timely manner.

== Controversies ==
=== Film financing ===
On 10 December 2025 Intercept Brasil revealed that in 2024 a non-governmental organization (NGO) belonging to Karina Ferreira da Gama, owner of GoUp Entertainment, signed a R$108 million contract with the City Hall of São Paulo to provide Wi-Fi service to low-income communities in the city. She was one of the executive producers of the film Dark Horse. The next day, several São Paulo city councilors filed complaints to the state's Public Prosecutor's Office, requesting an investigation into the responsibility of the mayor of São Paulo, Ricardo Nunes, the suspension of contracts signed with the city hall and the investigation of possible irregularities in the bidding process for da Gama's NGO.

In May 2026 Intercept Brasil reported that senator Flávio Bolsonaro had negotiated funding for Dark Horse with banker Daniel Vorcaro, the former head of Banco Master, who was under investigation in the Banco Master fraud case. According to the report, Flávio sought up to R$134 million (2025) (US$23.96 million) for the film, and at least R$61 million was allegedly transferred between February and May 2025 through intermediary structures, including Entre Investimentos e Participações and the Texas-based Havengate Development Fund LP, which was described as linked to allies of Eduardo Bolsonaro. For comparison, the 2025 Oscar-winning Brazilian film I'm Still Here had a budget of EUR7.6 million (2024) (US$8.23 million) and The Secret Agent, EUR4.7 million (2025) (US$5.3 million).

Flávio Bolsonaro initially denied the report, but later acknowledged having sought private sponsorship from Vorcaro for what he described as a private film about his father. He denied offering advantages, receiving money or using public funds, stating that there had been "zero" public money or Lei Rouanet funding involved. The production company and Mário Frias denied that funds from Vorcaro or Banco Master had reached the production.

On 15 May 2026, further reporting based on contracts and messages stated that Eduardo Bolsonaro, Flávio Bolsonaro's brother, had served as an executive producer on the film and had responsibilities related to financing strategy, investor materials and fundraising. The reports said the documents contradicted Eduardo's statement that he had merely licensed image rights for the project. Opposition lawmakers subsequently filed a criminal representation with the Prosecutor General's Office and the Federal Police requesting an investigation into Flávio Bolsonaro, Eduardo Bolsonaro, Jair Bolsonaro, Vorcaro, and others over the alleged funding arrangements.

=== Crew complaints ===
Brazilian media outlets also reported complaints from extras regarding working conditions on set, including low daily payments, alleged spoiled food and restrictions during filming.

=== Criticism ===
Brazilian media outlets also labeled the film as propaganda, focusing on the upcoming Brazilian general election in late 2026. Bolsonaro, who was tried and convicted of a coup d'état attempt and is currently imprisoned, endorsed his elder son Flávio Bolsonaro in the presidential race. Flávio Bolsonaro has been using the film as a platform for the family's political ideology (Bolsonarism).

By late May 2026, Lula supporters had formally filed a complaint to the Superior Electoral Court intending to prevent the film's release in the country until the elections take place. The Superior Electoral Court, led by Bolsonaro's nominated minister Nunes Marques, rejected the complaint, but the Brazilian distributors delayed the theatrical release to 2027, following the ongoing investigations around the film funding.

Flavio will appear at CPAC-Brasil at Maralago as keynote speaker.

== Marketing ==
On 7 December 2025, Carlos Bolsonaro published on X, formerly Twitter, a photo beside Jim Caviezel characterized as Bolsonaro in the filming set. On the following day, congressman Mário Frias published a teaser video with scenes of the former president political career, including his acting as a congressman, the wedding to Michelle and the 2018 attack. Frias is also shown acting as one of the doctors who took part on the surgery. Flávio and Carlos Bolsonaro were also present during some shootings, mainly in São Paulo.

== Release ==
The film was screened for distributors at the Fraud Fighter Summit in Las Vegas on 15 June 2026. In July 2026, Europa Filmes acquired distribution rights to the film in Brazil.

== See also ==
- Lula, Son of Brazil
