= Liberating a Continent: John Paul II and the Fall of Communism =

- Poster
- Directed by: David Naglieri
- Written by: David Naglieri
- Produced by: The Knights of Columbus
- Starring: Jim Caviezel; George Weigel; Cardinal Stanisław Dziwisz; Lech Wałęsa
- Cinematography: George Hosek
- Edited by: Marc Boudignon; Ted Maynard
- Music by: Joe Kraemer
- Distributed by: Public Broadcasting Service
- Release date: February 22, 2018
- Running time: 93 minutes
- Country: United States
- Language: English

Liberating a Continent: John Paul II and the Fall of Communism is a 2018 David Naglieri documentary about the role Pope John Paul II played in the demise of the Soviet Union (USSR), the end of Communism in Poland, and lifting the Iron Curtain. It is narrated by Jim Caviezel, his fourth narration of a documentary regarding the Catholic faith and the second of which is about John Paul II. It is directed by David Naglieri, who has also directed John Paul II in Ireland a Plea for Peace and John Paul II in America: Uniting a Continent. The former was the first documentary Caviezel narrates that deals with John Paul II. It portrays the nine day visit to Poland the Pope made in 1979, where he influenced the Solidarność movement. It also documents John Paul II's role in the movement to end martial law as declared by leaders of Poland, positing that his meetings with Communist leaders of Poland changed the course of history.

== Synopsis ==
Liberating a Continent is about the role Pope John Paul II played in the demise of the Soviet Union. It argues that John Paul II's 1979 visit to Poland was a critical event leading to the fall of the Berlin Wall and ultimately the dissolution of the U.S.S.R. It theorizes that John Paul engendered a "revolution of conscience" which ultimately caused the collapse of the Soviet Union because the USSR didn't fall with by violence, "without a single shot being fired".

== Cast ==
- Jim Caviezel as Narrator
- George Weigel
- Cardinal Stanisław Dziwisz
- Lech Wałęsa
- Norman Davies
- Richard V. Allen

== Purpose ==
David Naglieri said, regarding the film, that "the reason we set out to make this film is to kind of cement the legacy of Pope John Paul II."

Jim Caviezel stated that John Paul II had influenced his career tremendously, remarking that he probably never would have played Jesus Christ in Mel Gibson's The Passion of the Christ if it weren't for John Paul II. Caviezel actually had an audience with the Pope in 2004 before the release of The Passion. He also talked about his audience with the Pope in an interview with Craig Ferguson.

== Release ==
Liberating a Continent premiered on December 6, 2015, at the Copernicus Center in Chicago, IL. It later aired on public television, but had no theatrical release. Critically, the documentary was almost exclusively covered by Catholic or Christian news outlets, presumably due to its unobjectively Catholic perspective. "Liberating a Continent" was nominated for and won several awards.

Year	Award	Category	Result	Notes
2014	DocMiami International Film Festival	Most Inspirational Documentary Award	Won	
2014	Hollywood International Film Festival	Feature Documentary	Won	
2016	Chicago/Midwest Emmy Awards	Outstanding Achievement Photography	Won	
2016	Chicago/Midwest Emmy Awards	Outstanding Achievement for Documentary Programs	Won	
2016	Mexico International Film Festival	Best Feature Film	Won	
2016	WorldFest Houston	Documentary	Won	
2017	New Haven Film Fest	Best Biographical Documentary Film	Won	
