= Bob Ladouceur =

American football player and coach (born 1954)

Biographical details
- Born: July 3, 1954 (age 72); Detroit, Michigan, U.S.

Playing career
- 1972: Utah
- 1974–1975: San Jose State
- Position: Running back

Coaching career (HC unless noted)
- 1978–1979: Danville (CA) Monte Vista HS (assistant)
- 1979–2012: Concord (CA) De La Salle HS

Head coaching record
- Overall: 399–25–3

Robert Eugene Ladouceur (born July 3, 1954) is a retired American football coach. He was best known for being the head coach for the De La Salle High School football team in Concord, California.

== Early life ==
Ladouceur played for the Utah Utes football team in 1972 and for the San Jose State Spartans football team for 2 seasons in 1974-1975. Ladouceur graduated with a bachelor's degree in criminal justice from San Jose State University (SJSU) in 1977. Ladouceur received a Doctor of Humane Letters (honorary doctorate) from SJSU in 2015.

== Career ==
Prior to his coaching career, Ladouceur was a Probation officer. In 1978, Ladouceur began his high school coaching career as an assistant coach at Monte Vista High School. One year later, Ladouceur became the head coach at De La Salle High Spartans football team. He took over a program that never had a winning season since the school's establishment in 1965. His first season as head coach resulted in their first winning season. His second season resulted in their first appearance in the California Prep Football State Rankings and began De La Salle's evolution into a perennial champion. From 1992 to 2004, he guided the team to 12 consecutive undefeated seasons, setting a national winning streak record for high school football of 151 consecutive wins—a record in US amateur sports exceeded only by the 159-game winning streak of Passaic High School in men's basketball and the 459 match win streak of Brandon High School in men's wrestling. Ladouceur was enshrined to the National High School Hall of Fame in 2001. His team topped the USA Today rankings five times and he is a three-time coach of the year. He retired on January 4, 2013 with a career record of 399–25–3. His .934 winning percentage is a record among coaches with 200 or more wins. Ladouceur is the all-time winningest coach in California high school football and has led the De La Salle program to numerous championships. Ladouceur retired in January 2013 after winning his last Open Division state championship in December 2012.

=== When the Game Stands Tall ===
A film about his life called When the Game Stands Tall was released on August 22, 2014. The film, which stars Jim Caviezel as Coach Bob Ladouceur, Laura Dern as Bev Ladouceur, Michael Chiklis as assistant coach Terry Eidson, and Alexander Ludwig as running back Chris Ryan, is about the record-setting 151-game 1992–2003 high school football winning streak by De La Salle High School of Concord, California. The film is an adaptation of the 2003 book of the same name by Neil Hayes and published by North Atlantic Books.

== Personal life ==
Bob married Lissa Ladouceur on January 3, 2015.

== Championships and record ==
- National championships (11):1994 (ESPN), 1998 (USA Today), 1999 (National Sports News Service), 2000, 2001, 2002, 2003 (USA Today), 2009, 2010, 2011, 2012 (Calpreps)
- California State Bowl championships (5): 2007, 2009, 2010, 2011, 2012
- CIF North Coast Section championships (28): 1982, 1984, 1985, 1986, 1988, 1989, 1990, 1992, 1993, 1994, 1995, 1996, 1997, 1998, 1999, 2000, 2001, 2002, 2003, 2004, 2005, 2006, 2007, 2008, 2009, 2010, 2011, 2012
- East Bay league championships (5): 2008, 2009, 2010, 2011, 2012
- Bay Valley League championships (11): 1988, 1989, 1990, 1991, 1992, 1993, 1994, 1995, 1996, 1997, 1998
- Golden Bay League championships (2): 1986, 1987
- Catholic League championships (4): 1982, 1983, 1984, 1985

| Season | Team | Win | Loss | Tie | Notes |
|---|---|---|---|---|---|
| 1979 | De La Salle | 6 | 3 | 0 | |
| 1980 | De La Salle | 8 | 2 | 0 | |
| 1981 | De La Salle | 7 | 2 | 0 | |
| 1982 | De La Salle | 12 | 0 | 0 | NCS 2A champions |
| 1983 | De La Salle | 8 | 2 | 1 | |
| 1984 | De La Salle | 11 | 1 | 0 | NCS 2A champions |
| 1985 | De La Salle | 12 | 0 | 0 | NCS 2A champions |
| 1986 | De La Salle | 12 | 0 | 0 | NCS 3A champions |
| 1987 | De La Salle | 11 | 1 | 0 | |
| 1988 | De La Salle | 13 | 0 | 0 | NCS 3A champions |
| 1989 | De La Salle | 11 | 2 | 0 | NCS 3A champions |
| 1990 | De La Salle | 13 | 0 | 0 | NCS 3A champions |
| 1991 | De La Salle | 12 | 1 | 0 | |
| 1992 | De La Salle | 13 | 0 | 0 | NCS 3A champions; win streak begins with season-opening victory over Merced |
| 1993 | De La Salle | 13 | 0 | 0 | NCS 3A champions |
| 1994 | De La Salle | 13 | 0 | 0 | NCS 3A champions |
| 1995 | De La Salle | 13 | 0 | 0 | NCS 3A champions |
| 1996 | De La Salle | 12 | 0 | 0 | NCS 4A champions |
| 1997 | De La Salle | 12 | 0 | 0 | NCS 4A champions |
| 1998 | De La Salle | 12 | 0 | 0 | NCS 4A champions |
| 1999 | De La Salle | 12 | 0 | 0 | NCS 4A champions |
| 2000 | De La Salle | 13 | 0 | 0 | NCS 4A champions |
| 2001 | De La Salle | 12 | 0 | 0 | NCS 4A champions |
| 2002 | De La Salle | 13 | 0 | 0 | NCS 4A champions |
| 2003 | De La Salle | 13 | 0 | 0 | NCS 4A champions |
| 2004 | De La Salle | 8 | 3 | 2 | NCS 4A champions; win streak ends at 151 games with season-opening loss to Bellevue (WA) |
| 2005 | De La Salle | 11 | 2 | 0 | NCS 4A champions |
| 2006 | De La Salle | 13 | 1 | 0 | NCS 4A champions; lost to Canyon (Santa Clarita) in CIF Div. 1 Bowl, 13-27 |
| 2007 | De La Salle | 13 | 0 | 0 | NCS 4A champions; defeated Centennial (Corona) in CIF Div. 1 Bowl, 37-31 |
| 2008 | De La Salle | 12 | 2 | 0 | NCS Div. 1 champions; lost to Centennial (Corona) in CIF Div. 1 Bowl, 16-21 |
| 2009 | De La Salle | 13 | 2 | 0 | NCS Div. 1 champions; defeated Crenshaw in CIF Open Division Bowl, 28-14 |
| 2010 | De La Salle | 14 | 0 | 0 | NCS Div. 1 champions; defeated Servite in CIF Open Division Bowl, 48-8 |
| 2011 | De La Salle | 13 | 1 | 0 | NCS Div. 1 champions; defeated Westlake in CIF Open Division Bowl, 35-0 |
| 2012 | De La Salle | 15 | 0 | 0 | NCS Div. 1 champions; defeated Centennial (Corona) in CIF Open Division Bowl, 48-28 |
| TOTAL | 34 seasons | 399 | 25 | 3 | 0.938 winning percentage, 20 undefeated seasons, 28 North Coast Section championships, 5 CIF Bowl championships |
