= The Interview (1995 film) =

1995 film directed by Monique Gardenberg

- Directed by: Monique Gardenberg
- Written by: Monique Gardenberg; Cyrus Nowrasteh
- Produced by: Alan Poul; Flávio R. Tambellini
- Starring: Henry Czerny; Patrick Bauchau; Otávio Augusto; Júlia Lemmertz; Marília Pêra; Daniel Dantas; Ana Beatriz Nogueira
- Cinematography: Pedro Farkas
- Edited by: Dan Rae
- Music by: Philip Glass
- Production companies: Boku Films; Duerto Produções; Ravina Produções
- Distributed by: Riofilme (Brazil); Malofilm (Canada)
- Release date: 1 May 1995
- Running time: 100 minutes
- Countries: Brazil; United States
- Languages: English; Portuguese

The Interview (Jenipapo) is a 1995 Brazilian film directed by Monique Gardenberg and starring Otávio Augusto and Patrick Bauchau.
