= The Stoning of Soraya M. =

2009 film by Cyrus Nowrasteh

- U.S. theatrical release poster
- Persian: .سنگسار ثريا م
- Directed by: Cyrus Nowrasteh
- Screenplay by: Betsy Giffen Nowrasteh; Cyrus Nowrasteh
- Based on: La Femme Lapidée by Freidoune Sahebjam
- Produced by: Stephen McEveety; John Shepherd; Todd Burns; Diane Hendricks
- Starring: Mozhan Marnò; Shohreh Aghdashloo; Jim Caviezel; Parviz Sayyad; Vida Ghahremani; Navid Negahban
- Cinematography: Joel Ransom
- Edited by: David Handman; Geoffrey Rowland
- Music by: John Debney
- Production company: Mpower Pictures
- Distributed by: Roadside Attractions
- Release dates: September 7, 2008 (TIFF); June 26, 2009 (United States)
- Running time: 116 minutes
- Country: United States
- Languages: Persian; English
- Box office: $1.1 million

The Stoning of Soraya M. (Persian: .سنگسار ثريا م, romanized: Sangsār-e Sorayā M.) is a 2008 Persian-language American drama film adapted from French-Iranian journalist Freidoune Sahebjam's 1990 book La Femme Lapidée.

The film is directed by Cyrus Nowrasteh, and stars Academy Award nominee Shohreh Aghdashloo as Zahra, Jim Caviezel as foreign journalist Freidoune Sahebjam, and Mozhan Marnò as title character Soraya Manutchehri. The Stoning of Soraya M. had its world premiere at the 2008 Toronto International Film Festival, where it won the Director's Choice Award. It was also the second runner-up for the Cadillac People's Choice Award. The book has been banned in Iran.

== Background ==
French-Iranian journalist and war correspondent Freidoune Sahebjam was traveling through Iran, when he came upon Soraya Manutchehri's village, where he learned from her aunt about Soraya and her cruel fate. He would make Manutchehri's death the subject of his 1990 book La Femme Lapidée, which was translated into English in 1994. The Stoning of Soraya M. is an adaption of the book.

Soraya Manutchehri (Persian: ثریا منوچهری, romanized: Soraya Manuchehri; the "t" in the transcription by Sahebjam followed French spelling rules; c.1951 – 15 August 1986) was a 35-year-old woman who was stoned to death in the small village of Kuhpayeh, Iran, after being accused of adultery.

Unnamed witnesses have claimed that Manutchehri's husband, Ghorban-Ali, a prison guard with a petty criminal past, was eager to get rid of her in order to marry a 14-year-old girl. Not wanting to support two families, nor return Soraya's dowry, he spread false rumours of her alleged adultery after she began cooking for a local widower. Abetted by venal and corrupt village authorities, who turned her father against her, he accused his wife of adultery. She was convicted, buried up to her waist, and stoned to death.

Her death has been described as a slow, painful event with "a carnival atmosphere led by village elders". After her death, the body was allegedly left outside so that animals could "ravage" it.

== Plot ==
Stranded in the remote Iranian village of Kuhpayeh, a journalist is approached by Zahra, a woman with a harrowing tale to tell about her niece, Soraya, and the bloody circumstances of Soraya's death by stoning the previous day. The two sit down as Zahra recounts the story to Freidoune, who records the conversation. The journalist must escape with his life to tell the story to the rest of the world.

Ali is Soraya's abusive husband who tries to get the village's mullah to convince Soraya to grant him a divorce so that he can marry a 14-year-old girl. Ali is able to convince the mullah by making threats to tell the village about his past as a convict.

Ali's marriage to the teenager is conditional upon Ali's ability to save the girl's father, a doctor who has been sentenced to death for an unspecified crime. Ali and Soraya have two sons, and Ali does not want to lose them. After a woman dies, Ali asks Zahra to persuade Soraya to care for the woman's now-widowed husband. Soraya starts working for the widower, and Ali uses this situation to spread lies that Soraya is being unfaithful to him so that she will be stoned and he can remarry. Ali knows if Soraya were dead, he would not have to pay child support either. Ali and the mullah start a rumor about her infidelity so they can charge her with adultery. They need one more witness to her "infidelity" to be able to formally charge her. They manipulate and threaten the widower into backing up their story. Ali then drags Soraya through the streets, beating her and publicly declaring that she has been unfaithful. Zahra intervenes, and takes her niece, Ali, and the mayor to talk privately. They bring the widower to the home, and, after he lies as instructed, a trial is pursued. Only men, including Soraya's father, are allowed while Soraya is confined in Zahra's house. She is quickly convicted. Zahra tries to flee with her and after realizing she cannot, pleads with the mayor for her life, even offering to switch places with Soraya. The conviction is upheld.

Soraya's father is given the first stone to throw, but he misses her repeatedly. A woman in the crowd pleads to the mayor that the stones missing are a sign that Soraya is innocent, but none of the men listen. Ali takes up stones and throws them himself. Her two sons are also forced to throw stones. The widower is given stones as well but instead walks away in tears. The crowd finally joins in and Soraya is stoned to death.

In the present, the widower informs the journalist that his car is fixed. The mullah and the widower are informed by Ali that his marriage to the teenage girl is off, implying that he could not spare her father from execution. Angry at Ali and the mullah, the widower admits that he lied. As the journalist attempts to leave, the mullah orders a Revolutionary Guard to stop him at gunpoint. They seize his tape recorder and destroy the tapes. Zahra then appears with the true tape in her hand. Men attempt to run after the car as the journalist drives away and escapes. Zahra triumphantly declares that now the whole world will know of the injustice that has happened.

== Cast ==
- Mozhan Marnò as Soraya Manutchehri
- Shohreh Aghdashloo as Zahra
- Jim Caviezel as Freidoune Sahebjam
- Parviz Sayyad as Hashem
- Vida Ghahremani as Mrs. Massoud
- Navid Negahban as Ali
- Vachik Mangassarian as Morteza Ramazani, Soraya's father
- Bita Sheibani as Leila
- Noor Taher as Kataneh
- David Diaan as Ebrahim, the mayor
- Ali Pourtash as the mullah
- Laila Qutub as Mehri, the 14-year-old girl

== Production ==
The film received financing led by Mpower Pictures, the company started by President John Shepherd, Stephen McEveety, and Todd Burns. Additional financing came from Blackwater founder Erik Prince.

== Reception ==
=== Box office ===
The film's domestic gross was $636,246. It grossed $1,090,260 worldwide.

=== Critical response ===
The Stoning of Soraya M. received generally mixed reviews. The review aggregator website Rotten Tomatoes gives it a 59% approval rating, with an average score of 5.9 out of 10, based on 82 collected reviews. Its consensus states: "The Stoning of Soraya M. nearly transcends its deficiencies through the sheer strength of its subject material, but ultimately drowns out its message with an inappropriately heavy-handed approach." On Metacritic, which assigns a normalized rating out of 100 to reviews from mainstream critics, gives the film an average score of 50 based on 20 reviews, indicating "mixed or average reviews".

=== Accolades ===
Award	Category	Recipients and nominees	Outcome
Flanders International Film Festival	Canvas Audience Award	-	Won
Flanders International Film Festival	Gran Prix - Best Film	Cyrus Nowrasteh	Nominated
Heartland Film Festival	Heartland Truly Moving Picture Award	Cyrus Nowrasteh	Won
Los Angeles Film Festival	Audience Award for Best Narrative Feature	Cyrus Nowrasteh	Won
Satellite Awards	Best Motion Picture, Drama	-	Nominated
Satellite Awards	Best Actress in a Motion Picture, Drama	Shohreh Aghdashloo	Won
Satellite Awards	Best Actress in a Supporting Role	Mozhan Marnò	Nominated
Toronto International Film Festival	Runner Up Audience Choice Award	Cyrus Nowrasteh	Won
Movieguide Awards	Faith & Freedom Award for Movies	The Stoning of Soraya M.	Won

== See also ==
- Human rights in Iran
- Violence against women
- Rajm
