= Cameron Colvin =

American football player (born 1986)

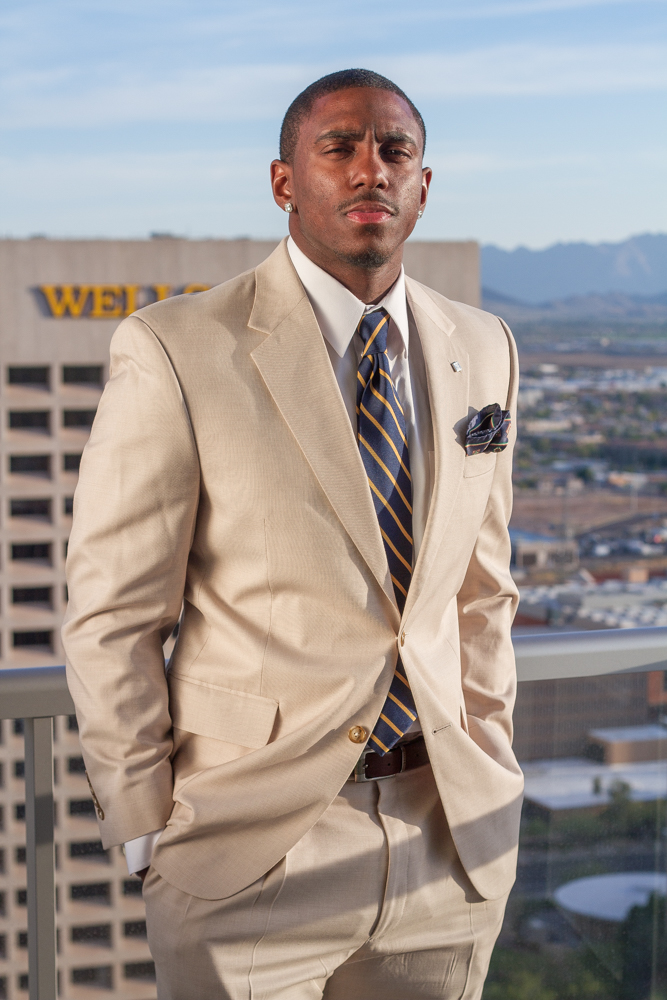
- Colvin in 2015

No. 80
- Position: Wide receiver

Personal information
- Born: March 5, 1986 (age 40); Pittsburg, California, United States
- Listed height: 6 ft 2 in (1.88 m)
- Listed weight: 195 lb (88 kg)

Career information
- High school: De La Salle (Concord, California)
- College: Oregon (2004–2007)
- NFL draft: 2008: undrafted

Career history
- San Francisco 49ers* (2008); Sacramento Mountain Lions (2010); Las Vegas Locomotives (2011)
- * Offseason or practice squad member only

Cameron John Colvin (born March 5, 1986) is a former professional football wide receiver.

== Early life ==
Both of Colvin's parents passed away before he turned 15. He played high school football for the De La Salle High School Spartans. De La Salle's football program held a 151-game winning streak at the time, the longest recorded streak in American football history.

Colvin's high school career has been depicted in the 2014 film "When the Game Stands Tall," in which he was portrayed by Ser'Darius Blain.

== College career ==
As a high school senior, Colvin committed to the University of Oregon in 2004. He graduated from the University of Oregon in 2007. His college career was hampered by a number of injuries; after catching 22 passes for 332 yards as a sophomore, he was limited to 121 receiving yards the following year.

== Professional career ==
Colvin was signed by the San Francisco 49ers on April 27, 2008, as an undrafted free agent, and was released on August 30, 2008. He was signed by the Sacramento Mountain Lions for the 2010 season but was released soon after. He was then signed by the Las Vegas Locomotives in 2011, catching 9 receptions for 80 yards during his time there. After the 2011 season, he became a free agent.

== Legal issues ==
Colvin has been the CEO of Nevada-based CamCo Commercial Inc. since July 2019. Colvin and CamCo have been defendants in multiple civil cases involving allegations of fraud, breach of contract, and unpaid wages, resulting in judgments exceeding $8,000,000.

In August 2025, Sportico reported that Colvin was under investigation by the Federal Bureau of Investigation (FBI) in relation to an alleged investment fraud scheme.

On October 30, 2025, Colvin was arrested by the FBI and charged with wire fraud and transactional money laundering. In a federal indictment filed on October 21, he is accused of defrauding victims of $1,250,000 through false investment opportunities.
