= The Face of Mercy =

Documentary about St. Faustina

- Poster
- Directed by: David Naglieri
- Screenplay by: David Naglieri
- Produced by: The Knights of Columbus; Congregation of the Sisters of Our Lady of Mercy
- Starring: Jim Caviezel; Scott Hahn; George Weigel; Fr. Michael Gaitley
- Cinematography: George Hosek
- Edited by: Marc Boudignon; Ted Maynard
- Music by: Sean Beeson
- Production company: Spirit Juice Studios
- Distributed by: American Broadcasting Company
- Release date: October 16, 2016
- Running time: 57 minutes
- Country: United States
- Language: English

The Face of Mercy is a 2016 documentary about Faustina Kowalska, her mystical visions, and the role that the Divine Mercy has played in different people's lives. It is narrated by Jim Caviezel.

== Synopsis ==
In 2015, Pope Francis declared an Extraordinary Jubilee of Mercy. The "year of mercy" began on December 8, 2015, the Feast of the Immaculate Conception, and ended on November 20, 2016.

Since his election to the papacy, Pope Francis has inspired millions by urging us to embrace Mercy, ultimately revealed in the face of Christ. Now comes an extraordinary new film on this powerful message that brings hope, healing and forgiveness to a broken world.

The documentary "draws connections between the history of Divine Mercy and this year's Extraordinary Jubilee Year of Mercy" and weaves together a thoughtful, beautiful, and educational film. Thus it is fitting that it is Pope Francis who says the first lines on screen. This is the context for this documentary, which came out during the last month of the Extraordinary Jubilee.

One of the first things said in the documentary, during the opening montage, is that "mercy is love's second name," which is a paraphrased quote of John Paul II. Divine Mercy, they argue, is God's response to the horrors of the 20th Century.

=== History ===
It begins with the history of St. Faustina and how John Paul II (Karol Wojtyła) brought the message given to St. Faustina by God. It also highlights the influence Divine Mercy played in the life in the young Wojtyła. George Weigel explains that this devotion culminated years later in his second encyclical entitled Dives in misericordia (or Rich in Mercy).

In addition to Weigel are John Allen, a Vatican Journalist, and Andrzej Duda, the President of Poland. They both tell of their perspectives on Divine Mercy.

=== Theology ===
Led by Scott Hahn, Cardinal Marc Ouellet, Fr. Michael Gaitley, Cardinal Seán O'Malley, and Fr. Seraphim Michalenko, the film uncovers the depth of the message St. Faustina received from Jesus. Furthermore, Weigel articulates the message of John Paul II's Dives in Misericordia saying, "In Christ we meet the Merciful face of the Father and the Truth about our Humanity."

== Film Festivals Awards ==
Year	Title	Notes
2016	International Lisbon Film Festival	Winter Edition
2017	International Christian Film Festival	
