= When the Game Stands Tall =

- Theatrical release poster
- Directed by: Thomas Carter
- Screenplay by: Scott Marshall Smith
- Story by: Scott Marshall Smith; David Zelon
- Based on: When the Game Stands Tall by Neil Hayes
- Produced by: David Zelon
- Starring: Jim Caviezel; Michael Chiklis; Alexander Ludwig; Clancy Brown; Laura Dern
- Cinematography: Michael Lohmann
- Edited by: Scott Richter
- Music by: John Paesano
- Production companies: TriStar Pictures; Affirm Films; Mandalay Pictures
- Distributed by: Sony Pictures Releasing
- Release dates: August 4, 2014 (Hollywood premiere); August 22, 2014 (United States)
- Running time: 115 minutes
- Country: United States
- Language: English
- Budget: $15 million
- Box office: $30.1 million

When the Game Stands Tall is a 2014 American sports drama film directed by Thomas Carter. The plot concerns a record 151-game 1992–2003 high school football winning streak by De La Salle High School of Concord, California. It stars Jim Caviezel as coach Bob Ladouceur, Laura Dern as Bev Ladouceur, Michael Chiklis as assistant coach Terry Eidson and Alexander Ludwig as running back Chris Ryan. The film is an adaptation of the 2003 book of the same name by Neil Hayes, published by North Atlantic Books. De La Salle head coach Bob Ladouceur retired in January 2013 after winning his last Open Division state championship in December 2012. The film was released on August 22, 2014.

== Plot ==
Bob Ladouceur, the coach of the De La Salle Spartans, watches his team win the championship of their undefeated 2003 season. Following tradition, the seniors share their stories about what the team means to them. The juniors, including Ladouceur's son Danny, celebrate with team captain Chris Ryan who has a chance of breaking the California state record for the highest career number of touchdowns. During an argument about whether to accept a coaching offer at the college level, Ladouceur's wife Beverly tells him that he does not spend enough time with his family. In a division meeting between coaches, Ladouceur is accused of cheating through scholarships or some other means of getting all the best players in the area. Ladouceur says scholarships are against the rules and he does not offer them. He arranges to have De La Salle play against Long Beach Polytechnic High School, a team with a similar reputation.

Ladouceur engages the team members in a passage from the Gospel of Luke that states that all good deeds will be rewarded. Rick Salinas, the quarterback of the team, shares that he is blessed for doing the right thing because he gets to play on the streak team. Tayshon Lanear feels otherwise. He doesn't think Salinas is in line to be starting quarterback because he's done the right thing, but because he is 6 feet 2 inches (1.88 m) tall and has a cannon for an arm. This provokes a mixed reaction from players who come from disadvantaged households. Reminded of team alumnus Cameron Colvin, Ladouceur pays him a visit in Richmond, California, and discovers that his mother is dying. Upon returning home, Ladouceur suffers a heart attack, affecting his ability to coach in the 2004 season. Colvin is approached by his best friend Terrance Kelly, who urges him to enroll at the University of Oregon so that they can play together. Not wanting to involve friends in the downward spiral he has found himself in, Colvin protests but eventually agrees. Days later, Kelly is shot and killed while trying to pick up a cousin and the Spartan team attends his funeral.

De La Salle's 151-game winning streak comes to an end when they lose a game against Bellevue High School. After the game, Mickey Ryan hits his son because of one play he messed up, even though he scored three touchdowns, and threatens further abuse if he does not break the touchdown record. Coach Ladouceur takes the team to a veteran's rehabilitation center, to deconstruct their respective ideas of brotherhood. To prepare for the game against Long Beach Poly, the teammates watch videos of previous games and see that all of the Poly players are faster and more physically imposing. The grueling game becomes a victory for De La Salle after Danny knocks down a pass by Poly into the end zone to help the Spartans hold Poly on all four downs from inside the 5-yard-line. The Spartans enter the final 2004 game with a renewed sense of confidence and hope that Ryan can score three touchdowns to break the record.

A number of touchdowns during the game, including two by Ryan, place De La Salle in a comfortable lead. Mickey cheers that enough time is left for him to break the record. When setting up their final play, Ryan gathers his teammates and tells them that it would be wrong for him to end his time with the team by chasing a personal victory. He instead gives up the ball and raises his helmet to Ladouceur. As the audience members do the same, the game ends with a tribute to the coach who brought them there.

== Cast ==
- Jim Caviezel as Coach Robert "Bob" Ladouceur
- Michael Chiklis as assistant coach Terry Eidson
- Alexander Ludwig as running back Christopher "Chris" Ryan
- Laura Dern as Beverly "Bev" Ladouceur
- Gavin Casalegno as Michael Ladouceur
- Clancy Brown as Mickey Ryan
- Ser'Darius Blain as Cam Colvin
- Stephan James as Terrance G. "T.K." Kelly
- Matthew Daddario as Daniel "Danny" Ladouceur
- Joe Massingill as Joe Beaser
- Jessie Usher as Tayshon Lanear
- Matthew Frias as Diego Garcia
- LaJessie Smith as Jamal
- Richard Kohnke as Rick Salinas
- Chase Boltin as Manny Gonzales
- Adella Gautier as T-Gram
- Marlon Favorite as Buster Matthews

== Production ==
Thomas Carter, who previously worked on Coach Carter, served as director. The screen adaptation was by Scott Marshall Smith. The film was produced by Mandalay Pictures and distributed through TriStar Pictures, a division of Sony Pictures Worldwide Acquisitions (SPWA). David Zelon produced for Mandalay and Peter Nelson and Rich Peluso worked on behalf of SPWA and its distribution arm AFFIRM. Allan Graf, who previously worked on Friday Night Lights, "[coordinated] the football scenes". Hayes, a Contra Costa Times journalist at the time the book was released, was part of the creative team. Zelon said the intrigue of this film was that Ladouceur "placed little value on winning, instead focusing his players on giving a 'perfect effort' in life". SPWA president Steve Bersch noted that the themes in the film transcended sports and cinema: "At its core, this is a timeless and universal story about character, hard work and love".

The filming began on April 22, 2013, and lasted until June 15, 2013.

== Reception ==
=== Critical response ===
On Rotten Tomatoes, When the Game Stands Tall has a critics' rating of 21% based on 68 reviews, with an average score of 4.60/10. The site's critical consensus reads, "An uneasy blend of solid game sequences and threadbare inspirational sports drama clichés, When the Game Stands Tall is overshadowed by better players in a crowded field." On Metacritic, the film holds a score of 41 out of 100, based on 24 critics, indicating "mixed or average reviews". Audiences polled by CinemaScore gave the film an average grade of "A-" on an A+ to F scale.

=== Box office ===
In its opening weekend, the film grossed $8,381,509 in 2,673 theaters, ranking at #5. By the end of its run, When the Game Stands Tall grossed $30,127,963 domestically.

=== Home media ===
When the Game Stands Tall was released on DVD and Blu-ray on December 9, 2014.

== See also ==
- List of American football films
