= Jim Caviezel =

American actor (born 1968)

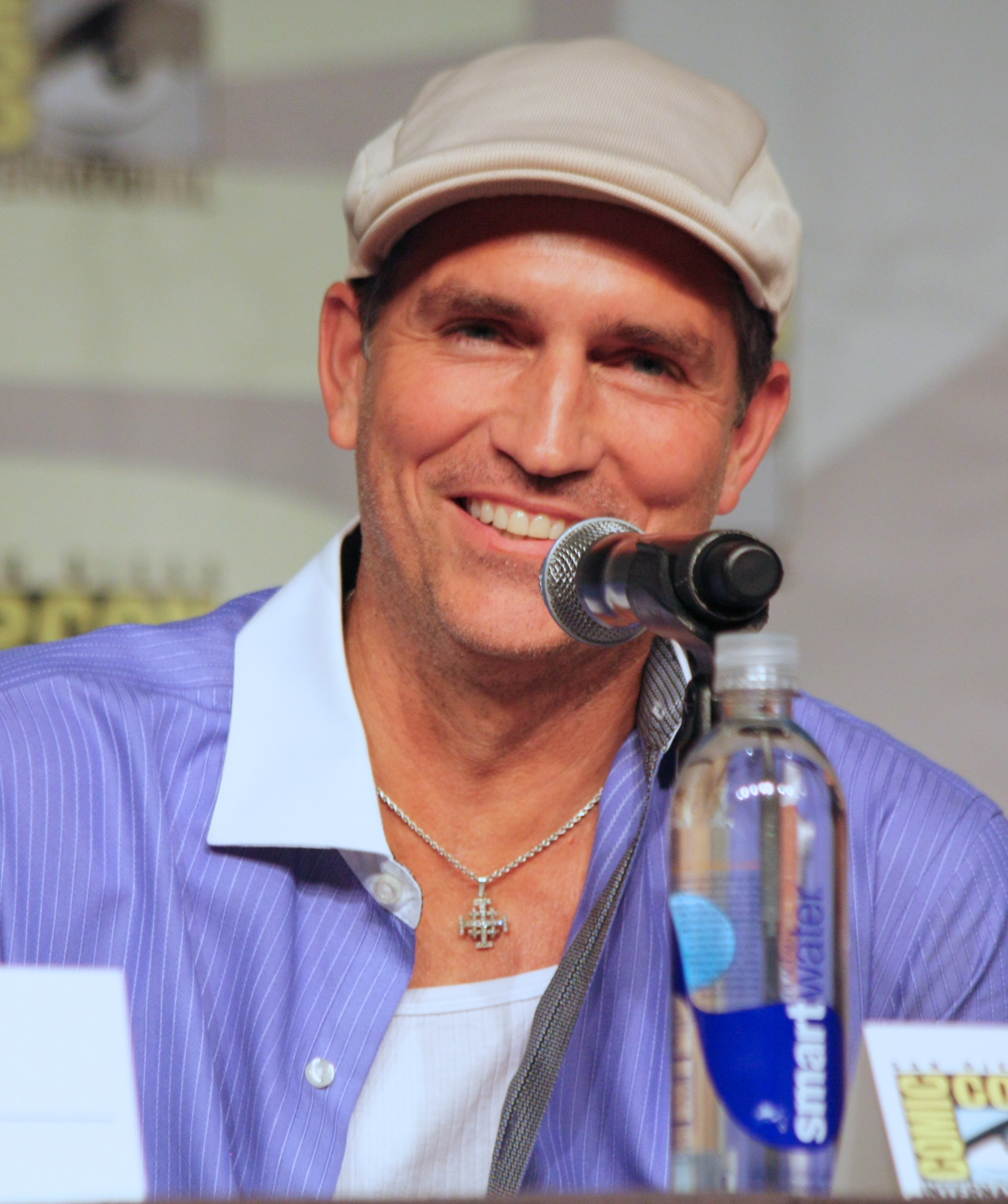
- Caviezel at the 2013 San Diego Comic-Con
- Born: James Patrick Caviezel Jr. September 26, 1968 (age 58); Mount Vernon, Washington, U.S.
- Education: University of Washington (dropped out)
- Occupation: Actor
- Years active: 1991–present
- Spouse: Kerri Browitt (m. 1996)
- Children: 3 (adopted)
- Website: jimcaviezel.com

James Patrick Caviezel Jr. (/kəˈviːzəl/; born September 26, 1968) is an American actor. He played Jesus in The Passion of the Christ (2004) and Tim Ballard in Sound of Freedom (2023), and starred as John Reese on the CBS series Person of Interest (2011–2016). He also played Slov in G.I. Jane (1997), Private Witt in The Thin Red Line (1998), Detective John Sullivan in Frequency (2000), Catch in Angel Eyes (2001), and Edmond Dantès in The Count of Monte Cristo (2002).

== Early life ==
Caviezel was born in Mount Vernon, Washington, U.S., the son of Margaret (née Lavery), a homemaker and former stage actress, and James Caviezel, a chiropractor. He has a younger brother, Timothy, and three sisters, Ann, Amy, and Erin. He was raised in a Roman Catholic family in Conway, Washington. His surname is Romansh. His father is of Swiss Romansh and Slovak descent, while his mother is Irish American.

Caviezel played basketball in high school and at Bellevue College. He had aspirations of playing professionally, but suffered a foot injury in his second year. Caviezel later transferred to the University of Washington, but left before graduating to pursue his acting career.

== Career ==
=== Early roles ===
Caviezel says that at age 19 while watching a movie in a theater, he felt a sense of peace overcome him and that God was asking him to become an actor. After his basketball career ended due to injury, he began acting in plays in Seattle, Washington. He earned his Screen Actors Guild card with a minor role in the 1991 film My Own Private Idaho. He then moved to Los Angeles to pursue a career in acting. When he decided to move, "people thought I was out of my mind," he said. He was offered a scholarship to study acting at New York's Juilliard School in 1993, but he turned it down to portray Warren Earp in the 1994 film Wyatt Earp. He later appeared in episodes of Murder, She Wrote and The Wonder Years, along with a role in G.I. Jane (1997).

Caviezel had a breakthrough performance in the 1998 Terrence Malick-directed World War II film The Thin Red Line. He had met with Malick several times before securing the role and had told his wife that if he did not get a role in the film, he intended to quit show business and move back to Washington. He later played Black John, a Missouri bushwhacker, in Ride with the Devil (1999), an American Civil War film.

Caviezel was originally cast to play Scott Summers / Cyclops in X-Men (2000), but dropped out because of a scheduling conflict with the film Frequency (2000). He starred in the mainstream films Pay It Forward (2000), Angel Eyes (2001), and The Count of Monte Cristo (2002). In 2000, he played the lead role in Madison, a film about hydroplane racing in Madison, Indiana. The film was completed in 2001, but did not appear in theaters until a limited release in 2005. In 2002, he played a leading role in the film I Am David.

=== The Passion of the Christ ===
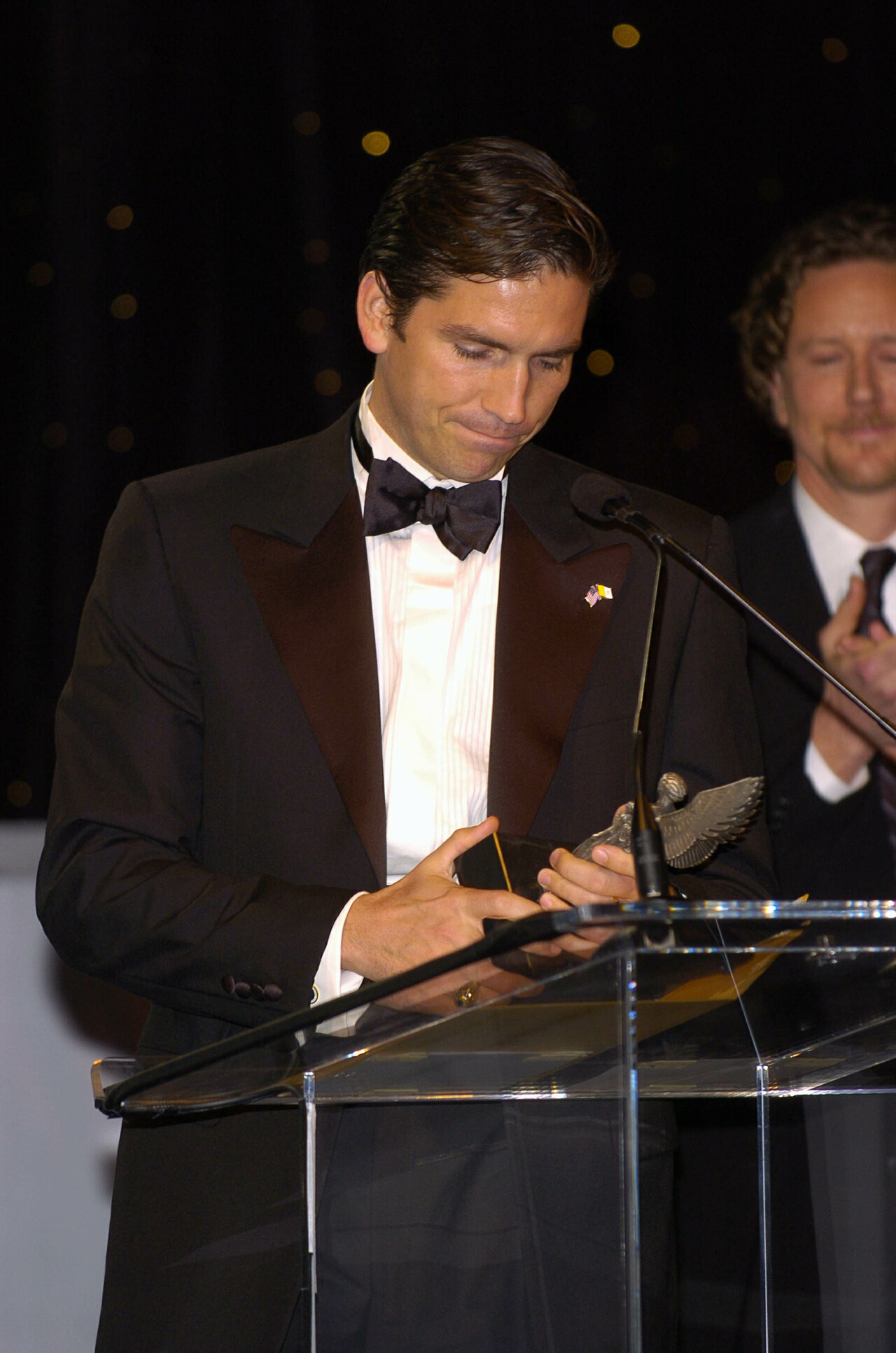
Caviezel pondering an award, 2005

Caviezel was first approached about playing Jesus Christ in The Passion of the Christ through his agent, who told him Mel Gibson and his partner were interested in him for a role in an unrelated screenplay, which he later learned was a cover story. Caviezel met with Gibson in Malibu, and after more than three hours of conversation, Gibson brought up the role of Jesus, which Caviezel accepted. The following day, Gibson called Caviezel to ask if he was sure he wanted the role and told him he may never work in Hollywood again if he accepted the role. Caviezel says he responded, "Each one of us has our own cross to carry — we either pick it up and carry it or we get crushed under the weight of it." During the conversation, Caviezel told Gibson he just realized he was 33 years old and his initials were J.C., to which Gibson responded "you're freaking me out" and hung up the phone.

He described the filming of the movie as "torture". During filming in Italy in the winter, he was struck by lightning, scourged by accident, dislocated his shoulder, and suffered from pneumonia and hypothermia during extended filming sessions on the cross in cold, windy conditions. He awoke as early as 2:00 AM for eight-hour makeup sessions which led to skin infections, and headaches because one of his eyes was closed shut. He was accidentally struck during the scourging at the pillar scene because one of the actors playing a Roman soldier missed the wooden board which had been set up behind his back. The real wound it made on his back was then used as a model for the makeup artist. The cross he carried in the film weighed over 150 pounds, and, at one point, Caviezel fell under the weight of it and bit his tongue. His own blood was streaming out of his mouth in one scene which was in the final cut of the movie.

He was struck by lightning during the last shot of filming, which was the Sermon on the Mount scene. He recalled, "People started screaming and they said I had fire on both sides of my head and a light around me...I had locked eyes with people and it was very eerie because they made a weird sound – the kind of sound people made when they saw the jet plane run into the World Trade Center. It was a sickening feeling." The lightning strike caused complications for his heart, requiring two surgeries and several years to correct. Asked what part of the film had the greatest effect on him, he said, "I'll be honest with you, there are things that I went through that I can't even talk about."

Caviezel said the experience of filming The Passion deepened his faith. During filming, he regularly prayed the Rosary and went to confession. "As a result of playing this part, I have become even more passionate about the Way of the Cross. It is about Our Lord’s sacrifice for mankind, for our sins, bringing us back to God, and it’s love that did this."

Of the controversy that erupted over The Passion, including accusations of anti-Semitic undertones, Caviezel said, "It's been the most frustrating thing to watch. ... Our faith is grounded in our Jewish tradition. We believe we're from the House of David. We believe we're from the House of Abraham, so we cannot hate our own. That crowd standing before Pontius Pilate screaming for the head of Christ in no way convicts an entire race for the death of Jesus Christ any more than the actions of Mussolini condemn all Italians, or the heinous actions of Stalin condemn all Russians. We're all culpable in the death of Christ. My sins put him up there. Yours did. That's what this story is about."

=== After The Passion ===
Caviezel's career struggled in the years immediately following The Passion, which grossed over $600 million at the box office and was the second highest-grossing R-rated film ever made at the time after The Matrix Reloaded. In 2018, he told People, "As soon as I did Passion, other [film offers] stopped coming in," but added, "I'm a big boy and I'm not going to play a victim." He became more outspoken about his beliefs, saying, "I had no choice but to defend my faith at that point." He also said he had to be more protective of his family and his time because he became recognizable around the world, and struggled with how to approach future endeavors because he felt he could not top the Passion role.

He did have roles in three films released in 2004 which had been filmed prior to the release of The Passion, starring in Bobby Jones: Stroke of Genius and Highwaymen, and taking a supporting role in The Final Cut, which starred Robin Williams.

His career rebounded when he was cast as the villain opposite star Denzel Washington in the 2006 thriller Déjà Vu, which was a box office hit. He also had a leading role in Unknown (2006). He provided the voice of Jesus on the 2007 New Testament audio dramatization The Word of Promise. He played Kainan in Outlander (2008). Also in 2008, he starred in Long Weekend.

In 2009, Caviezel played French-Iranian journalist Freidoune Sahebjam in The Stoning of Soraya M., a drama set in 1986 Iran about the execution of a young mother. When asked about how his Catholic faith was affected by this story, he said, "You don't have to go any further than the gospels to figure out what the right thing to do is, whether you should be more concerned helping someone regardless of their religion or where they're from". That same year, he reprised the role of Jesus in the latest installment of The Word of Promise. Caviezel starred in The Prisoner, a remake of the British science fiction series with the same name, in November 2009.

=== Person of Interest and other roles ===
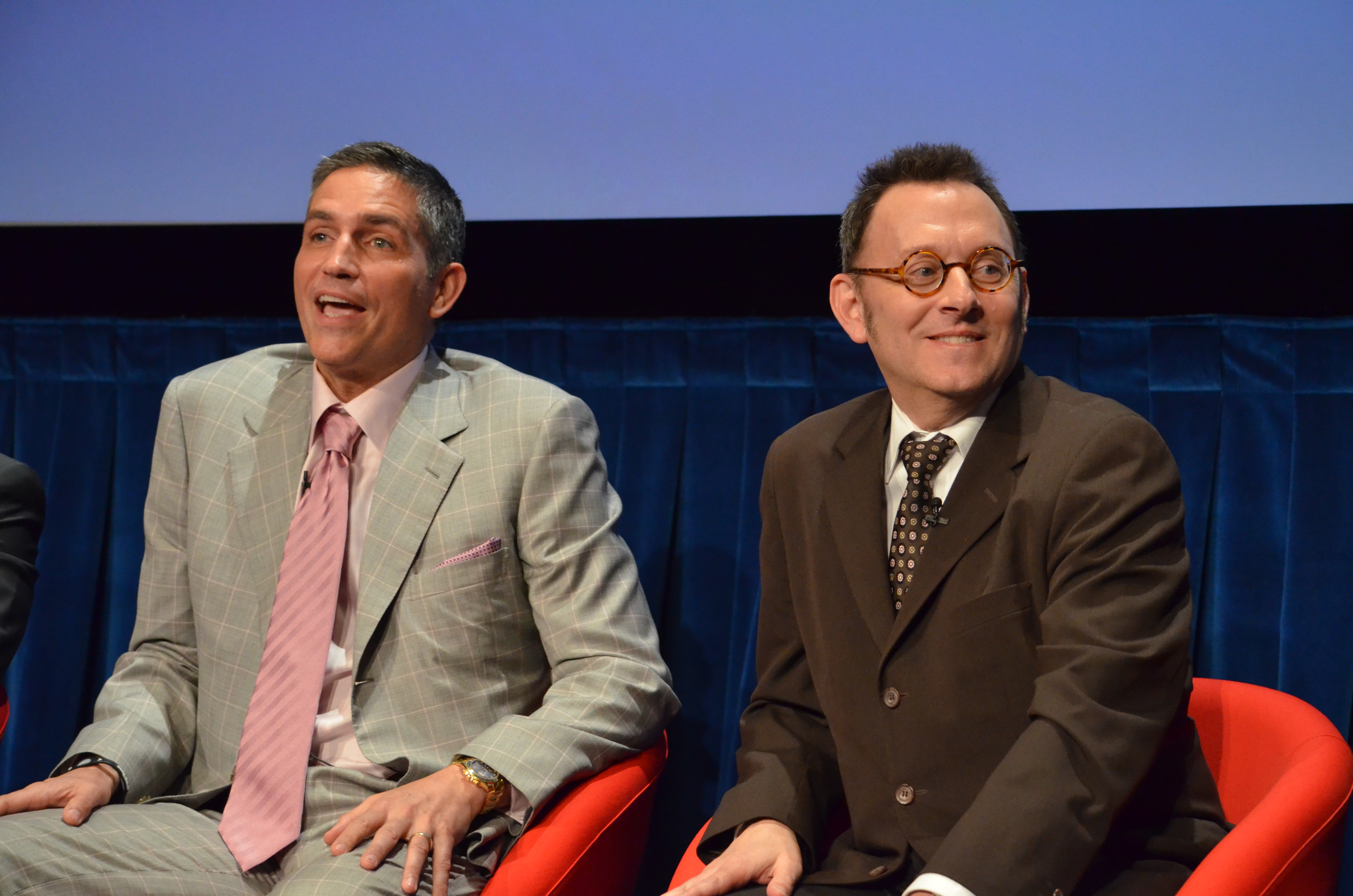
Caviezel with Person of Interest co-star Michael Emerson, 2012

From 2011 to 2016, Caviezel starred in the CBS drama series Person of Interest as John Reese, a former CIA agent who now works for a mysterious billionaire as a vigilante. He drew on martial arts training he had done as a child and boxing experience as an adult to do most of his own stunts. The show received the highest ratings in 15 years for a series pilot and consistently garnered over 10 million weekly viewers, with much critical acclaim. Caviezel was nominated for the People's Choice Award for Favorite Dramatic TV Actor in 2014 and again in 2016 for his work on Person of Interest.

After Person of Interest concluded in 2016, Caviezel signed on as lead character of CBS's SEAL Team series in 2017. However, Caviezel left the project due to creative differences before production began and was replaced by David Boreanaz.

Caviezel starred in the 2014 football film When the Game Stands Tall as De La Salle High School coach Bob Ladouceur, whose Concord, California, Spartans prep team had a 151-game winning streak from 1992 to 2003, an American sporting record. He appeared in the 2013 film Escape Plan, playing a warden who maintains order in the world's most secret and secure prison.

Caviezel narrated two documentaries in 2016 regarding Christianity. One was Liberating a Continent: John Paul II and the Fall of Communism and the other was The Face of Mercy. In an interview about the former film, he stated that John Paul II had crushed communism "with love".

=== Most recent projects ===
Caviezel portrayed the Apostle Luke in the film Paul, Apostle of Christ, which opened in theaters on March 23, 2018, to mixed reviews.

In 2018, Caviezel signed on to portray Tim Ballard, a DHS Agent and an anti-human-trafficking activist, in the film Sound of Freedom, about the organization Operation Underground Railroad (O.U.R.) and its mission to save children from sex trafficking and slavery. Ballard had specifically requested that Caviezel play him. Caviezel stated, "This is the second most important film I have ever done since The Passion of the Christ. ... It's going to affect the saving of a lot of children and the changing of lives. It will also bring a lot of light into the darkness." The film was completed in 2018 but spent five years in production limbo. It was the subject of much controversy, and Caviezel said two of his agents and his lawyer dropped him over the role. He said the controversy was due to his belief that human trafficking was/is still legal in many European countries: "Listen, you do Schindler's List 50 years later, you're a hero. Try doing Schindler's List when the real Nazis are right there. Understand how that becomes more dangerous? I don't understand why people are willing to let children be hurt, but in this time, Hollywood says, 'No, no, let's kick that down fifty years from now and then [see where we're at]'. That's crap." The film was picked up by Angel Studios and theatrically released on July 3, 2023, and became a surprise box office hit, grossing over $251 million internationally.

Caviezel starred in the 2020 political thriller film Infidel, produced by Dinesh D'Souza.

Caviezel was originally set to reprise his role as Jesus in The Resurrection of the Christ, a sequel to The Passion of the Christ, having signed on with Gibson in 2018. In 2020, Caviezel said, "Mel Gibson just sent me the third picture, the third draft. It's coming." He added, "It's going to be the biggest film in world history." In a 2025 interview, Gibson said he still planned on Caviezel returning as Jesus, despite Caviezel being in his 50s, with plans to use de-aging special effects to make him appear younger. The sequel entered production, with principal photography commencing on August 2, 2025. In October 2025, it was reported that Caviezel was no longer cast as Jesus, and later he was replaced by Jaakko Ohtonen.

In 2025, Caviezel was cast to portray former Brazilian President Jair Bolsonaro in the biographical thriller Dark Horse, directed by Cyrus Nowrasteh. The film, scripted by Nowrasteh and former Brazilian Secretary of Culture Mário Frias, focuses on Bolsonaro's 2018 presidential campaign and the stabbing attempt against him. Production took place in Brazil and the United States, with a scheduled release for September 2026. According to Frias, Caviezel was his only choice for the role, and he agreed to play Bolsonaro without negotiating a fee.

In 2026, Caviezel started as the lead role in Ghost Soldier as a retired soldier who helps a family save their land from a corrupt organization and he will portray King Herod in Zero A. D.: The Birth of Christ.

== Personal life ==
=== Marriage and children ===
In 1996, Caviezel married Kerri Browitt, a high school English teacher. Out of respect for his wife and his faith, Caviezel avoids doing graphic sex scenes in his roles. He said, "I do love scenes—but not ones with gratuitous sex. I also don't do gratuitous violence. And it's not just about my wife, although that's important. It's sin, pure and simple. I mean, it's wrong." Caviezel's wife requested he wear a shirt and Jennifer Lopez wear a top during a love scene in the film Angel Eyes, and he refused to strip in a love scene with Ashley Judd in High Crimes.

Caviezel and his wife have adopted three children from China. All three children were suffering from major health problems when the Caviezels adopted them. Their first child, Bo, had been abandoned on a train as a baby and was raised in an orphanage. When they adopted him in 2007, Bo had a large brain tumor requiring multiple surgeries. Caviezel said he was "completely terrified" at the possibility of adopting a disabled child but knew God wanted him to do it. When they decided to adopt a second from China, the agency proposed a healthy newborn baby, but during the process they met a five-year-old girl in a foster home who had a brain tumor. Reasoning that the healthy newborn would find a good home but the ill five-year-old would not, they adopted the five-year-old. Their third child was suffering from cancer at the time they adopted him.

=== Religious beliefs ===
Caviezel is a devout Catholic. In a 2017 interview, Caviezel talked about the importance of his Catholic faith, the lasting impact that The Passion of the Christ has had on his life, and his devotion to the Christian figure Mary. During the filming of The Passion of the Christ in Italy, he received daily counsel, confession, and Holy Communion from a local Catholic priest, with an interpreter.

=== Political views ===
Caviezel is publicly against abortion. In 2006, Caviezel was featured with actress Patricia Heaton and Missouri athletes Kurt Warner and Mike Sweeney in an advertisement opposing Missouri Constitutional Amendment 2, which allowed any form of embryonic stem cell research and therapy in Missouri. He began the advertisement by saying, "Le-bar nash be-neshak" (Aramaic for "(to) the Son of Man with a kiss"), a reference to Judas's betrayal of Jesus Christ and a phrase used in the Gospel of Luke. In the advertisement, the line did not include a translation into English. Caviezel closed the commercial with the line, "You know now. Don't do it. Vote no on 2." The advertisement was a response to a commercial featuring Michael J. Fox, who favored embryonic stem cell research.

=== QAnon-related comments and Sound of Freedom ===
During publicity for Sound of Freedom, Caviezel made several public comments about child trafficking, adrenochrome, and QAnon that drew media attention. The film, in which Caviezel portrayed anti-trafficking activist Tim Ballard, centers on child sex trafficking and was filmed in 2018. Director Alejandro Monteverde said he began developing the project in 2015, before QAnon emerged, and stated that the film itself was not based on QAnon. NPR likewise reported that Sound of Freedom contains no references to adrenochrome or QAnon-related conspiracy theories, and that Angel Studios, Ballard, and Operation Underground Railroad had rejected any association with conspiracy theories.

In April 2021, Caviezel appeared remotely at the Health and Freedom Conference in Broken Arrow, Oklahoma, where he discussed Ballard, child trafficking, and what he called the "adrenochroming of children". Several outlets characterized the remarks as repeating a QAnon-linked conspiracy theory about trafficked children being tortured or killed so that adrenochrome can be harvested from them. In a 2023 interview with Aleteia, Caviezel again described adrenochrome in connection with child exploitation, while Operation Underground Railroad stated that it did not condone conspiracy theories about adrenochrome harvesting and was not affiliated with QAnon or other conspiracy theory groups.

In October 2021, Caviezel spoke at the "For God & Country: Patriot Double Down" conference, which Newsweek described as a QAnon convention. During the speech, Caviezel discussed child sex trafficking and spiritual warfare and used the phrase "the storm is upon us", which Newsweek identified as language associated with QAnon beliefs about a coming confrontation with an alleged elite cabal.

After Sound of Freedom was released in 2023, Caviezel denied that the film was connected to QAnon. In a July 2023 appearance on The Charlie Kirk Show, he said that he had not known about QAnon when the movie was filmed and that the film had "nothing to do" with it. In the same interview, however, he defended people associated with QAnon, compared criticism of them to the persecution of early Christians, repeated the claim that "QAnon" does not exist but rather "Q" and "anons", and made further claims about adrenochrome. Subsequently, Newsweek reported that QAnon researcher Mike Rothschild described Caviezel's language as typical of QAnon adherents.

== Filmography ==
Key
†	Denotes films that have not yet been released

=== Film ===
Year	Title	Role	Notes
1991	My Own Private Idaho	Airline Clerk	
1992	Diggstown	Billy Hargrove	
1994	Blue Chips	Basketball Player	Uncredited
1994	Wyatt Earp	Warren Earp	
1996	Ed	Dizzy Anderson	
1996	The Rock	FA-18 Pilot	
1997	G.I. Jane	"Slov" Slovnik	
1998	The Thin Red Line	Private Witt	
1999	Ride with the Devil	Black John	
2000	Frequency	John Sullivan	
2000	Pay It Forward	Jerry	
2001	Angel Eyes	Steven "Catch" Lambert	
2001	Madison	Jim McCormick	
2002	The Count of Monte Cristo	Edmond Dantès	
2002	High Crimes	Tom Kubik	
2003	I Am David	Johannes	
2004	The Passion of the Christ	Jesus Christ	
2004	The Final Cut	Fletcher	
2004	Bobby Jones: Stroke of Genius	Bobby Jones	
2004	Highwaymen	James "Rennie" Cray	
2006	Unknown	Jean Jacket	
2006	Déjà Vu	Carroll Oerstadt	
2008	Outlander	Kainan	
2008	Long Weekend	Peter	Nature's Grave in the US
2008	The Stoning of Soraya M.	Freidoune Sahebjam	
2011	Transit	Nate	
2013	Escape Plan	Warden Willard Hobbes	
2013	Savannah	Ward Allen	
2014	When the Game Stands Tall	Bob Ladouceur	
2017	The Ballad of Lefty Brown	Jimmy Bierce	
2018	Paul, Apostle of Christ	St. Luke	
2018	Running for Grace	Doctor Reyes	
2018	Onyx, Kings of the Grail	Narrator	
2020	Infidel	Doug Rawlings	
2023	Sweetwater	Sports Writer	
2023	Sound of Freedom	Tim Ballard	
2026	Dark Horse	Jair Bolsonaro	
2026	Ghost Soldier	Henry "Fitz" Fitzgerald	
2026	Zero A. D.: The Birth of Christ †	Herod the Great	Post-production

=== Television ===
Year	Title	Role	Notes
1992	The Wonder Years	Bobby Riddle	Episode: "Hero"
1995	Murder, She Wrote	Darryl Harding	Episode "Film Flam"
1995	Children of the Dust	Dexter	Miniseries
2009	The Prisoner	Michael / Six	Miniseries
2011–2016	Person of Interest	John Reese	103 episodes

=== Documentary ===
Year	Title	Role	Notes
2015	Guadalupe: The Miracle and the Message	Narrator	
2016	Liberating a Continent: John Paul II and the Fall of Communism	Narrator	
2016	The Face of Mercy	Narrator	
2018	John Paul II in Ireland: A Plea for Peace	Narrator	
