= Mozhan Navabi =

Iranian-American actress (born 1979/1980)

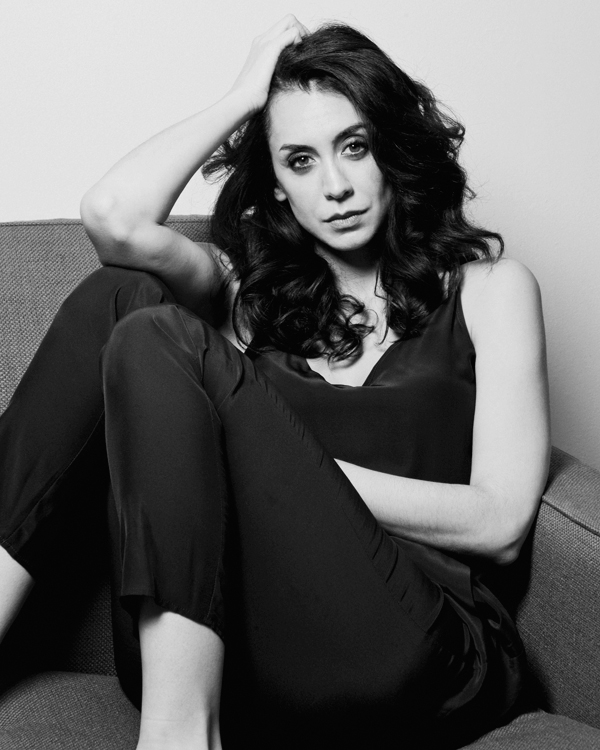
- Navabi in 2015
- Born: 1979/1980 (age 46–47); Los Angeles County, California, U.S.
- Other name: Mozhan Marnò
- Education: Barnard College (BA); Yale University (MFA)
- Occupations: Actress, writer, director
- Years active: 2006–present

Mozhan L. Navabi (born 1979/1980) is an Iranian-American film and television actress. She is known for her roles in The Blacklist and House of Cards and played Soraya Manutchehri in The Stoning of Soraya M.. From the 2006 start of her career, she was credited as Mozhan Marnò, but has been credited by her maiden name, Navabi, since a 2024 guest appearance on an episode of Law & Order.

== Early life and education ==
Navabi was born in Los Angeles. Her parents are both from Iran and met in California. She was educated at Phillips Academy in Andover, Massachusetts. She received her B.A. in French and German comparative literature from Barnard College of Columbia University and her M.F.A. in acting from the Yale School of Drama.

== Personal life ==
As of 2015, she was living in Brooklyn, New York, having moved there sometime before filming began in 2014 for her first season on The Blacklist. In addition to English she speaks French, German, Persian, and some Italian.

== Career ==
Mozhan Navabi played the title role in the 2008 film The Stoning of Soraya M., set in Iran, about a woman whose husband falsely accuses her of adultery, resulting in her death by stoning. In addition she has had roles in a number of television series including The Paul Reiser Show, The Glades, Hung, The Mentalist, Bones, The Unit, Medium, K-ville, and Standoff. Navabi also appeared in the Untitled John Wells Medical Drama Pilot, which was not aired. She also stars in Ana Lily Amirpour's directorial debut, A Girl Walks Home Alone at Night, produced by Elijah Wood, under his company, The Woodshed. In 2011, Navabi voiced Mirabelle Ervine, a Breton mage and Master Wizard of the College of Winterhold, in the critically acclaimed video game The Elder Scrolls V: Skyrim. She played reporter Ayla Sayyad on seasons 2 and 3 of the acclaimed Netflix series House of Cards, for which she was nominated for a SAG award. She played Mossad agent and assassin Samar Navabi in seasons 2-6 of The Blacklist.

Navabi also directs and writes screenplays. Her first feature-length screenplay, When the Lights Went Out, was a quarter finalist for the Nicholl Fellowship. She adapted When the Lights Went Out as a play and it was mounted at New York Stage and Film in July 2013 starring Laura Innes, and directed by Kate Whoriskey. Navabi’s short film, Incoming, which she wrote and directed, was accepted to the Noor Iranian Film Festival, LA SHORTS FEST, the Asians on Film Festival, and the DC Asian Pacific American Film Festival.

In February 2024, Navabi was cast in the Netflix limited series Zero Day, in the recurring role of Melissa Kornblau.

== Filmography ==
Note: credited as Mozhan Marnò from 2006 to 2023, credited as Mozhan Navabi since 2024

=== Film ===
Year	Title	Role	Notes
2007	Charlie Wilson's War	Refugee Camp Translator #2	
2008	August	Ashley	
2008	Traitor	Leyla	
2009	The Stoning of Soraya M.	Soraya Manutchehri	
2009	StereoLife	Gwendolyn Leeds	Short film
2010	Apples	Lucky	Short film (voice role)
2014	A Girl Walks Home Alone at Night	Atti	
2019	London Arabia	Mrs. Hassan	Short film
2019	Wonder Woman: Bloodlines	Doctor Cyber	Direct-to-video (voice role)
2021	iGilbert	Detective Rivera	Last film credit as Mozhan Marnò
2024	A Chair for Her	Lameece	Short film First film credit as Mozhan Navabi

=== Television ===
Year	Title	Role	Notes
2006	The Unit	Protocol Chief	Episode: "Security"
2006	Standoff	Agnacia	Episode: "Life Support"
2007	Shark	Maria Lutrova	Episode: "Gangster Movies"
2007	K-Ville	Jodi Mazetta	Episode: "Ride Along"
2009	Bones	Azita Jabbari	Episode: "A Night at the Bones Museum"
2009	Medium	Rachel	Episode: "The Devil Inside, Part 2"
2009, 2011	The Mentalist	Nicki Weymouth	2 episodes
2010	Hung	Samara	Episode: "The Middle East is Complicated"
2010	The Glades	Renee LeFleur	Episode: "Cassadaga"
2011	The Paul Reiser Show	Zeba	Recurring role
2012	Ringer	Marguerite	Episode: "P.S. You're an Idiot"
2012	In Plain Sight	Charlotte	Episode: "Sacrificial Lamb"
2014–2015	House of Cards	Ayla Sayyad	Recurring role (seasons 2–3)
2014, 2019	Madam Secretary	Roxanne Majidi	2 episodes
2014–2022	The Blacklist	Samar Navabi	Main cast (seasons 2–6), guest episode (season 9)
2019	The Affair	Petra	Recurring role (season 5)
2021	Maid	Tara	Limited-run series, 2 episodes
2022	Pam & Tommy	Gail Chwatsky	Miniseries, recurring role
2022	Fleishman Is in Trouble	Nahid	Miniseries, recurring role (last TV credit as Mozhan Marnò)
2024	Law & Order	Stacey Dean	Episode: "Unintended Consequences" (first TV credit as Mozhan Navabi)
2025	Zero Day	Melissa Kornblau	Miniseries, recurring role
2025	The Beast in Me	Esme Noor	Miniseries, episode: "Thanatos"

=== Video games ===
Year	Title	Role
2011	The Elder Scrolls V: Skyrim	Mirabelle Ervine, Namira
2016	1979 Revolution: Black Friday	Bibi Golestan

=== Audio recordings ===
Year	Title	Author	Role
2015	Hausfrau	Jill Alexander Essbaum	Narrator
2016	The Other Einstein	Marie Benedict	Narrator
2016	Missoula	Jon Krakauer	Narrator
2016	The Guest Room	Chris Bohjalian	
2018	Song of a Captive Bird	Jasmin Dzarnik	Narrator
2019	The Stationery Shop	Marjan Kamali	Narrator
2019	The Other Americans	Laila Lalami	Nora
2020	The Paris Diversion	Chris Pavone	Narrator
2020	The Book of Longings	Sue Monk Kidd	Narrator
2024	The Perfect Marriage	Jeneva Rose	Narrator
2025	The Perfect Divorce	Jeneva Rose	Narrator
2025	Good Girl	Aria Aber	Narrator

== Awards and nominations ==
Year	Association	Category	Nominated work	Result
2009	Satellite Awards	Best Supporting Actress – Motion Picture	The Stoning of Soraya M.	Nominated
2015	Screen Actors Guild Awards	Outstanding Performance by an Ensemble in a Drama Series	House of Cards	Nominated
