= Freidoune Sahebjam =

French-Iranian journalist (1933–2008)

- فریدون صاحب جم
- Born: 1933
- Died: 26 March 2008 (aged 74–75)
- Occupations: Journalist, war correspondent, and novelist
- Writing career
- Notable work: La Femme Lapidée

Freidoune Sahebjam (Persian: فریدون صاحب جم; 1933 – 26 March 2008) was a French-Iranian journalist, war correspondent, and novelist who resided in Neuilly-sur-Seine in France.

He gained international recognition for his novel La Femme Lapidée, in 1990, about Soraya Manutchehri, which was translated four years later as The Stoning of Soraya M.: A True Story. The book became the basis for screenplay of the 2008 film The Stoning of Soraya M., in which the American actor James Caviezel portrays Sahebjam.

Sahebjam was a journalist for the French TV channel LCI and for French newspapers such as Le Monde and Le Télégramme.

Before his death, he had recently written a biography on his mother, an aristocrat of Qajar heritage, entitled Une Princesse Persane. He died on Wednesday 26 March 2008, aged 75. The cause of death was not reported.

== Bibliography ==
- The Stoning of Soraya M., Arcade Publishing, 1994
- Une Princesse Persane, a biography of his mother, an aristocrat of Qajar heritage
- Morte parmi les vivants : Une tragédie afghane
- La Femme Lapidée [The Stoning of Soraya M.]
- Je n'ai plus de larmes pour pleurer (with Reza Behrouzi)
- Le Vieux de la montagne
- Reviens Mahomet, ils sont devenus fous : Chroniques de la barbarie islamique ordinaire
- Le Dernier Eunuque
- Mohamad reza pahlavi, shah d'iran
- Un procès sans appel
