= De La Salle High School (Concord, California) =

Private college-prep day school in Concord, California, United States

Location
- 1130 Winton Drive; Concord, California; United States; 37.934415°N 122.031279°W

Information
- Type: Private, College-prep, day
- Motto: French: Les Hommes De Foi; English: Men of Faith
- Religious affiliations: Roman Catholic (De La Salle Brothers)
- Established: 1965; 61 years ago
- Founder: Institute of the Brothers of the Christian Schools
- Sister school: Carondelet High School
- CEEB code: 050662
- President: David Holquin
- Grades: 9–12
- Gender: Male
- Enrollment: 1,029 (2023–2024)
- Campus size: 19 acres (77,000 m^{2})
- Color: Green - White - Silver
- Slogan: Enter To Learn, Leave to Serve
- Athletics conference: CIF North Coast Section (EBAL)
- Nickname: Spartans, De La, DLS,
- Team name: The Spartans
- Accreditation: Western Association of Schools and Colleges
- Newspaper: The Winton Oracle
- Yearbook: The Odyssey
- School fees: $23,440 (2023–2024)
- Website: www.dlshs.org

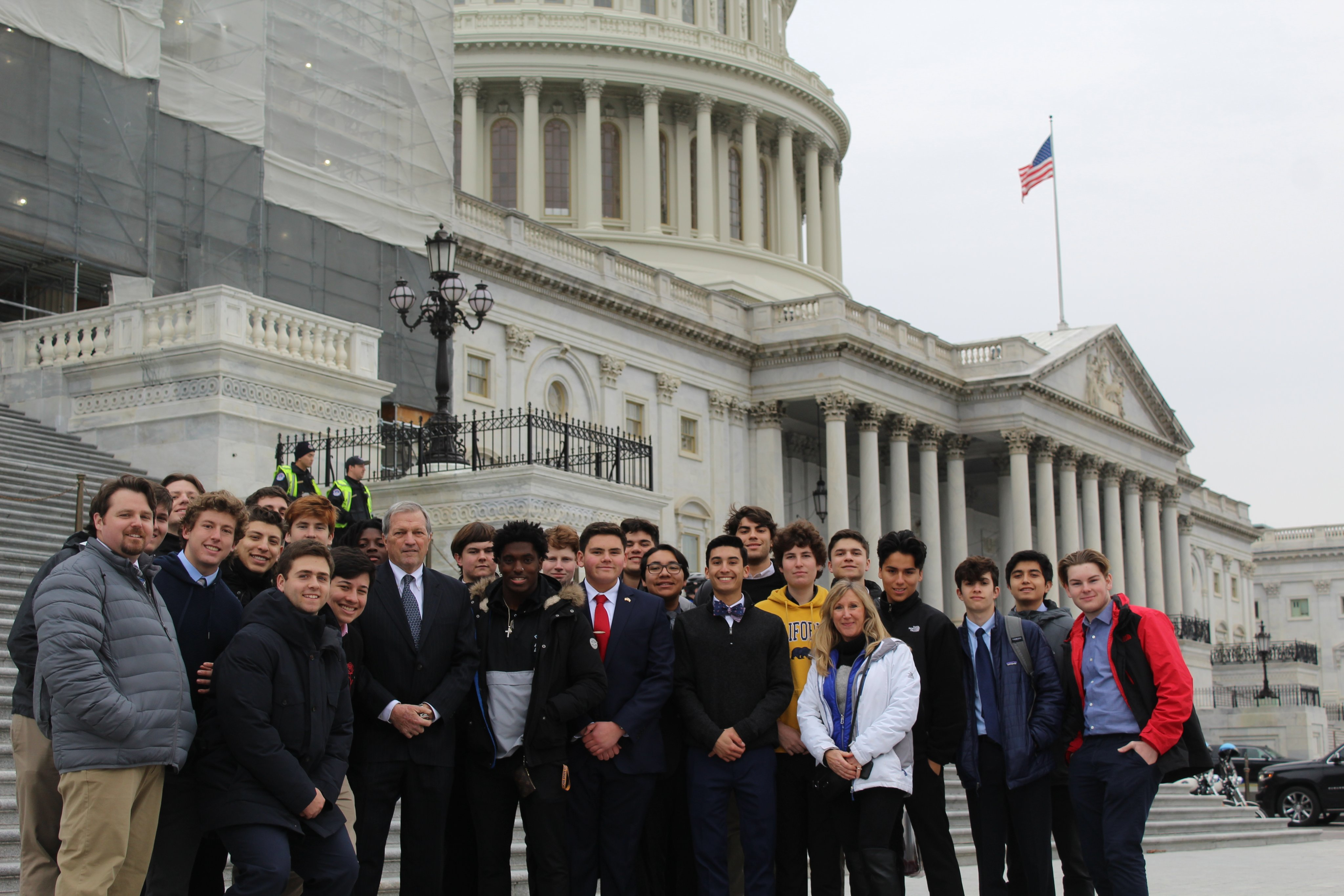
Students from De La Salle High School meet with Mark DeSaulnier in Washington, D.C. in 2020.

De La Salle High School is a private Lasallian Catholic school for boys run by the De La Salle Christian Brothers of the San Francisco New Orleans District within the Diocese of Oakland. It is located in Concord, California. The school was founded in 1965.

De La Salle currently enrolls 1,036 students, and roughly 99% of each graduating class goes on to attend a university or college. It is home to the Spartans, the athletic varsity teams of the school, and its school colors are green and silver. The school motto is "Les Hommes De Foi", French for "Men Of Faith," which is based on the order's Latin motto "Signum Fidei".

== Athletics ==
=== Baseball ===
The De La Salle baseball team as of 2023 had won six straight North Coast Section (NCS) Championships, and five of the prior eight EBAL Championships. It won the inaugural CIF Division 1 NorCal Championships in 2022, and again in 2023. In 2015-16 it was 25-3 and was ranked second in the nation.

In 2017-18 it was 26-4 and was ranked second in the nation. As a sophomore in 2018 , Milwaukee Brewers pitcher Kyle Harrison was 9-1 with a 1.17 ERA. He was named EBAL Pitcher of the Year, a 2018 MaxPreps National All-American, and Cal-Hi Sports All-State Underclass. In 2018-19 it was 29-1 and was ranked second in the nation. As a junior in 2019 Harrison was 10–0 with a 1.26 ERA for the Spartans, with 103 strikeouts in 61 innings, and also played first base.

Connor “Bear” Harrison, Kyle Harrison's younger brother, in May 2023 was named Cal-Hi Sports North Coast Section Baseball Player of the Year after batting .419 while playing catcher his junior year; he also played first base and pitched as a closer. In his senior season in 2023, Bear batted .404 and was named first team all-state and the Bay Area News Group Player of the Year.

=== Football ===
De La Salle High School holds the national record 151-game winning streak spanning from 1992 to 2004. The streak occurred under the leadership of Bob Ladouceur, who began coaching at the school in 1979. It ended when they were defeated on September 4, 2004, by Bellevue High School (Washington), outside Seattle. De La Salle finished the 2007 football season 13–0 and as state champions. In 2009, De La Salle defeated Crenshaw 28–14 to win the state title again. In 2010, De La Salle defeated Servite, ranked #7 in the nation, 48–8, to win the state title game for a second straight year. De La Salle finished the season 14–0 and ranked #1 in the nation by MaxPreps.

During the winning streak, De La Salle was named national champion in seven different years; once by ESPN (1994), five times by USA Today (1998, 2000, 2001, 2002, and 2003), and once by the National Sports News Service (1999). The Spartans have been named national champions by ESPNRISE.com (formerly Student Sports) six times, including four straight years (2000–03). They have also been honored as the top team in California 19 times (1992, 1994–2003, 2007, 2009–2012, 2014–2015) and competed in 25 California Interscholastic Federation (CIF) North Coast Section (NCS) championship games with 23 victories (12 of which were attained during the 151-game winning streak). For the 2008–2009 school year, De La Salle was ranked the 18th best high school football team in the country by USA Today, the 37th by ESPNRISE, the 19th by MaxPreps, and the 14th by Sports Illustrated.

In somewhat recent years, the team has won the California Open Division State Championships six times (2009, 2010, 2011, 2012, 2014, and 2015). They have appeared in the Open Division state title game every year from the founding of the division in 2008 until 2019. Prior, they had competed in Division I, where they were the 2007 State Champions and the 2006 and 2008 runner-up. They have won the North Coast Section championships every year since 1992, with the league's restructuring. From 1991 to 2021, they had a streak of 318 games without a loss when playing Northern California schools (going 316–0–2). This ended on September 10, 2021, when they lost to St. Francis High School of Mountain View. The Lancers, coached by St. Francis alum Greg Calcagno, beat De La Salle in the closing seconds of the game by the score of 31-28.

On December 13, 2025 they were defeated by Santa Margarita High School in the California state championships by a score of 47-13.

== Campus ministry and spirituality ==
In the minds of the Brothers, their purpose "is to give a human and Christian education to the young, especially the poor, according to the ministry which the Church has entrusted to it." De La Salle Concord sponsors Nativity school in Shinara, Eritrea. Students have the opportunity to participate in many retreats and immersion experiences throughout their time at the school, including a "Ven a Ver" program (Come to See), which involves spending five days with the disadvantaged people of Salinas or Tijuana.

== In media ==
The De La Salle football team was the subject of two 2003 books. One Great Game: Two Teams, Two Dreams, in the First Ever National Championship High School Football Game, by Don Wallace, follows the undefeated 2001 season and national championship showdown with Long Beach Polytechnic High School, and splits its focus between the schools. When the Game Stands Tall was written by Contra Costa Times sportswriter Neil Hayes, who followed the team for practices, games, and meetings during its undefeated 2002 season. The foreword was written by former Oakland Athletics and St. Louis Cardinals manager Tony LaRussa. The 2014 movie When the Game Stands Tall is based on Neil Hayes' book.

== Notable alumni ==
=== American football ===
- Devin Asiasi, tight end
- Jackie Bates, former professional football player
- Zeke Berry, college football cornerback for the Michigan Wolverines
- Doug Brien, former kicker in the National Football League
- Brian Callahan, Quarterbacks coach and passing game coordinator for the New York Giants
- Nick Holz, Passing Game Coordinator for the Las Vegas Raiders
- T. J. Carrie, former cornerback for the Cleveland Browns and Oakland Raiders
- Cameron Colvin, former professional football player
- Toa Fa'avae, college football quarterback for the New Mexico Lobos
- Isaiah Foskey, American football defensive end for the Cincinnati Bengals
- Matt Gutierrez, former NFL quarterback
- Austin Hooper, NFL tight end for the Atlanta Falcons
- Maurice Jones-Drew, former running back for the Jacksonville Jaguars and Oakland Raiders
- Derek Landri, former defensive tackle for the Philadelphia Eagles
- Tuli Letuligasenoa, defensive tackle
- David Loverne, former guard for the New York Jets
- Tosh Lupoi, head football coach, University of California, Berkeley
- Kevin Simon, former linebacker
- Aaron Taylor, former offensive lineman for Green Bay Packers
- Henry To'oTo'o, linebacker for the Houston Texans
- Amani Toomer, former wide receiver for the New York Giants
- T. J. Ward, former NFL safety
- Terron Ward, former NFL running back
- Demetrius Williams, former NFL wide receiver
- D. J. Williams, former middle linebacker for the Denver Broncos and Chicago Bears
- Dylan Wynn, professional football player
- Larry Allen III, former All-Ivy League offensive lineman Harvard, undrafted played for the Dallas Cowboys, son of NFL Hall of Fame player Larry Allen.

=== Baseball ===
- Blake Burke, baseball first baseman and designated hitter
- Chris Carter, professional baseball outfielder
- Kyle Harrison (born 2001), baseball pitcher for the Milwaukee Brewers
- Charles McAdoo, baseball infielder for the Toronto Blue Jays
- Mike Miller, professional baseball infielder for the Boston Red Sox
- A.J. Puckett, professional baseball pitcher
- Eric Reyzelman, professional baseball pitcher
- Tyler Spangler, baseball shortstop in the Philadelphia Phillies organization

=== Basketball ===
- Drew Barry, professional basketball shooting guard
- Jon Barry, professional basketball shooting guard
- Brent Barry, professional basketball shooting guard
- Scooter Barry, professional basketball shooting guard
- Justin Joyner, Oregon State Beavers men's basketball, head coach

=== Other sports ===
- Derek Asbun, played rugby for the U.S. national team; at UC Berkeley was two-time All American and captain in rugby
- Stefan Frei, professional soccer player for the Seattle Sounders FC
- Kristian Ipsen, Olympic diver, bronze medalist
- Dino Waldren, plays rugby for the U.S. national team
- Chris Wondolowski, former professional soccer player

=== Other ===
- Charley Koontz, actor
- John Bedell, filmmaker
