= The Young Messiah =

- Theatrical release poster
- Directed by: Cyrus Nowrasteh
- Written by: Cyrus Nowrasteh; Betsy Giffen Nowrasteh
- Based on: Christ the Lord: Out of Egypt by Anne Rice
- Produced by: Michael Barnathan; Chris Columbus; Tracy K. Price; Mark Radcliffe; Mark W. Shaw
- Starring: Adam Greaves-Neal; Sara Lazzaro; Vincent Walsh; Clive Russell; Sean Bean
- Cinematography: Joel Ransom
- Edited by: Geoffrey Rowland
- Music by: John Debney
- Production companies: Ocean Blue Entertainment; 1492 Pictures; CJ Entertainment; Hyde Park International
- Distributed by: Focus Features
- Release date: March 11, 2016 (United States)
- Running time: 111 minutes
- Countries: United States; South Korea
- Language: English
- Budget: $18.5 million
- Box office: $7.3 million

The Young Messiah is a 2016 biblical drama film directed by Cyrus Nowrasteh and co-written by Betsy and Cyrus Nowrasteh, based on the novel Christ the Lord: Out of Egypt by Anne Rice. The film stars Adam Greaves-Neal, Sean Bean, David Bradley, Lee Boardman, Jonathan Bailey, and David Burke. The film revolves around a fictional interpretation of a seven-year-old Jesus, who tries to discover the truth about his life when he returns to Nazareth from Egypt.

Nowrasteh acquired the film rights in 2011, and wrote the script along with his wife Betsy Giffen. Chris Columbus developed the film through his 1492 Pictures banner and helped the film financing by Ocean Blue Entertainment. FilmDistrict acquired the US distribution rights in 2013, which were later transferred to Focus Features in 2014. Filming began on September 15, 2014, in Matera and Rome, Italy.

Although the film was known throughout production as Christ the Lord, Focus Features announced on September 1, 2015, that it would now be called The Young Messiah. Nowrasteh said in a press release, "This new title better conveys how our film seeks to present a realistic portrait of Jesus as a child both grounded in faith and consistent with the adult Jesus revealed in the Bible."

The film was released on March 11, 2016, by Focus Features. Reviews were mixed, and the film proved to be a box office bomb, grossing only $7 million against a budget of $18.5 million.

== Plot ==
Seven-year-old Jesus is playing in Alexandria with his cousins when the bully Eliezer beats Jesus and then turns to his female cousin. Satan throws an apple before Eliezer and he falls to his death. Satan turns the crowd against Jesus and they accuse him of cursing Eliezer. His mother Mary saves him from the mob but as he and his cousins hide in the house they ask Jesus to repeat with Eliezer the act he showed them previously: bringing a dead bird to life.

Jesus sneaks out of the house and into Eliezer's home where preparations are being made for his disemboweling and burial. When Jesus resurrects Eliezer, the boy resumes beating Jesus. Eliezer's parents ask Joseph, Jesus and Mary to leave Alexandria saying "Seven years is more than enough".

Joseph tells Mary and his extended family that he had a dream and it is time to return to Israel because Herod the Great is dead. Mary insists on returning to Nazareth instead of Bethlehem. The family departs.

On the road to Nazareth, Jesus's uncle Cleopas is growing more unwell, coughing; Jesus says he cannot heal him because he has been asked not to. As the family rests Jesus walks into an ambush of rebel Jews waiting for a passing Roman cavalry. One of the rebels tries to shoo Jesus away. This rebel pushes Jesus out of harm's way and sacrifices his own life. One of the Centurions saves Jesus from one of the Roman soldiers.

Jesus runs back to his family to find Cleopas delirious by the river Jordan. Jesus cannot resist and moves to heal him. The news spreads and reaches the new Jewish King who orders his Roman Centurion to find the boy healer and execute him.

Jesus and the family encounter a man raping a woman by the roadside. The lady knifes the attacker and kills him. Joseph and Cleopas bury the rapist, and the victim joins the family on their road to Nazareth. They see crucifixions of Jewish rebels.

In Nazareth, Roman soldiers accuse them of banditry and rebellion. Grandmother Sarah shares sweet cakes and good wine with the soldiers. The soldiers spare Joseph and the extended clan.

The centurion returns to Herod Archelaus in the middle of a belly dancing entertainment. He informs the Centurion that he just crucified a man who told him about the return of Jesus, who has a gift camel.

Jesus is taken to Temple for schooling. He amazes the rabbis with his wisdom and knowledge, but Jesus faints on the way back. Satan torments Jesus as he lies unwell and tells him that his little miracles will mean nothing.

Jesus is restored to health and he asks to visit Jerusalem for Passover. The centurions track Jesus to Sarah's house in Nazareth but they have already departed for Jerusalem. The soldiers extract information about the boy's name. The soldiers intercept the travelers on the road but the family hides in the caves.

Jesus leaves the cave alone in the middle of the night for Jerusalem asking God for guidance and safety. Jesus enters Jerusalem; his parents follow looking for him. Jesus is given some coins by well-meaning pilgrims and he uses the coins to free a sacrificial dove. Jesus finds a blind rabbi and asks about what happened seven years ago in Bethlehem. Satan guides the Centurions to the boy by the rabbi. The rabbi is healed by Jesus.

The centurion corners Jesus and the people in the temple gather around Jesus identifying him as the boy who healed the rabbi. Centurion Severus desists from killing the boy and asks them to leave the temple.

Severus falsely reports to Herod that he has killed the boy. Mary tells Jesus the answers to all the questions he was looking for. Jesus runs to his family.

== Cast ==
- Adam Greaves-Neal as Jesus
- Sara Lazzaro as Mary
- Vincent Walsh as Joseph
- Christian McKay as Cleopas (Clopas)
- Jonathan Bailey as Herod Archelaus
- Rory Keenan as Satan
- Sean Bean as Severus
- David Bradley as an old rabbi of Nazareth
- Jane Lapotaire as Sarah
- Clive Russell as Weer
- Lee Boardman as a Roman squad leader
- David Burke as a blind rabbi
- Agni Scott as Miriam
- Paul Ireland as an optio
- Finn McLeod-Ireland as James
- Isabelle Adriani as Seleni

== Production ==
Principal photography began on location on September 15, 2014, in Matera, Italy. Shooting also took place in Rome at Cinecittà studios.

According to director Cyrus Nowrasteh, James and Salome, referred in the Bible as Jesus' brother and sister, are portrayed as his cousins. Nowrasteh said that the idea is that they had "sort of been adopted... they all referred to one another as brother and sister in those times." The filmmakers had cross-denominational support for the film's production, and received positive feedback from evangelicals and Catholics alike. Nowrasteh's wife Betsy helped rewrite two scenes taken from the apocryphal Infancy Gospel of Thomas in order to bring them more into line with the Gospels.

The film was recognized by Time as introducing "a new class in the world of Jesus narratives". According to the director, "it wasn't easy material to tackle".

=== Music ===
On January 17, 2013, John Debney was hired to compose the music for the film.

== Release ==
The film was previously set for March 23, 2016, release, but on January 15, 2015, Focus Features moved the release up to March 11, 2016. On December 22, 2015, a sneak peek video clip was released on the movie's website. The film met the qualification criteria for the 89th Academy Awards.

=== Distribution ===
On June 21, 2013, it was announced that FilmDistrict had acquired the US distribution rights to the film and planned to release the film in March 2015. The film was then being developed and financed by Rise Entertainment, under a five-year deal inked between Rise and 1492 Pictures. 1492 Pictures, Hyde Park Entertainment, CJ Entertainment, and Ocean Blue Entertainment would produce the film, and Hyde Park would handle the international sales for the film. Producers would be Columbus, Barnathan, and Radcliffe for 1492, Tracy K. Price for Ocean Blue, Ashok Amritraj for Hyde Park, and Mark W. Shaw for CJ.

On May 16, 2014, it was reported again that Ocean Blue would finance the film along with CJ, Echo Lake Productions, and Ingenious Media, while 1492 Pictures would produce the film along with Ocean Blue, CJ, Hyde Park and Ingenious. Focus Features acquired the US rights from FilmDistrict, and set the film to begin production in September 2014.

== Reception ==
=== Box office ===
In the United States and Canada, the film opened on March 11, 2016, alongside 10 Cloverfield Lane, The Brothers Grimbsy and The Perfect Match. It was originally projected to gross $7–8 million in its opening weekend, however after grossing just $1.4 million on its opening day, estimates were lowered to $3–4 million. It ended up grossing $3.3 million in its opening weekend, finishing 7th at the box office.

=== Critical response ===
The film has gathered mixed-to-negative critical responses. On Rotten Tomatoes, the film has an approval rating of 50%, based on 38 reviews, with an average rating of 5.60/10. On Metacritic, the film has a score of 33 out of 100, based on 9 critics, indicating "generally unfavorable reviews". Audiences polled by CinemaScore gave the film an average grade of "A−" on an A+ to F scale.

Steven D. Greydanus reviewed The Young Messiah for the National Catholic Register, saying it was smartly adapted by Cyrus and Betsy Nowrasteh. Greydanus said he could imagine watching the film with a mixed group of people of faith and no faith while holding everyone's interest. He says this project could have turned into "the greatest imaginable act of authorial hubris and irrelevance", except that the filmmakers found an elegant solution in drawing on both the Gospels and the apocryphal Gospels, while reworking all the material to bring it into conformance with right beliefs among Christians. Greydanus says that "The Young Messiah offers an imaginative vision of the most iconic and celebrated family in human history that is both surprising and familiar, warmly human and credible yet also different."

Despite its setting in first-century Judea, the film featured predominantly British and British-influenced accents, reflecting the longstanding convention in Biblical cinema of using British accents for historical settings. One critic remarked that the principal cast "could easily pass for guest stars on Downton Abbey".

== Accolades ==
MovieGuide awarded the film the Epiphany Prize for Inspiring Movies as well as the Grace Award in the Actor category, presented to Adam Greaves-Neal.
