= Mark Nowrasteh =

American playwright and screenwriter (born 1985)

Mark Nowrasteh (born November 30, 1985) is an American playwright and screenwriter.

== Early life ==
Mark Nowrasteh was born in Burbank, California, on November 30, 1985. Both of his parents are writers in the film and television industry. His father, Cyrus Nowrasteh, is also a director ("The Stoning of Soraya M.", The Young Messiah). His older brother is Alex Nowrasteh, an immigration policy analyst at the CATO Institute, a libertarian think tank in Washington D.C.

== Career ==
Nowrasteh studied playwriting at UCLA. His instructor and mentor, Leon Martell, worked extensively in the world of theater in Los Angeles and elsewhere. It was there that Nowrasteh authored his first work. The play, entitled, "The Emperor and the Apostle," depicts the trial of the Apostle Paul in Rome under Emperor Nero in 64 A.D. during the great fire. The play brought Nowrasteh to Austin, Texas where it will be produced in 2016.

Nowrasteh's play led to him being hired to write screenplays. One of which, Ends of the Earth, was a finalist for the $50,000 Chronos Prize held by MovieGuide in 2014. The film depicts the Apostle Peter leading the infant Church in its struggle to survive following the ascension of Jesus Christ.

Ends of the Earth is now owned by Ocean Blue Entertainment in partnership with 1492 Pictures, the same companies that produced The Young Messiah.

Nowrastehʼs success on the above projects led to producer Michael Emerson hiring him to pen a screenplay about Leigh Ann Hester, the most decorated female in American military history. Currently entitled Raven Four-Two the project has attracted support from the US Army and is scheduled for production in 2016.

== Upcoming projects ==
Nowrasteh is currently in talks to write two screenplays, one based on the Epic of Gilgamesh, and is ghostwriting a book to be published next year. His ambition is to also publish a novel in the future.

== Personal life ==
Nowrasteh married his wife, Elizabeth (née Dupree), on August 9, 2013, in Austin, Texas. He resides in Austin with her and her son. The couple also have one daughter together.
