= List of Person of Interest characters =

This is a list of characters in the American science fiction crime drama television series Person of Interest.

== Main characters ==
Actor	Character	Seasons				
Actor	Character	Season 1	Season 2	Season 3	Season 4	Season 5
Jim Caviezel	John Reese	Main	Main	Main	Main	Main
Michael Emerson	Harold Finch	Main	Main	Main	Main	Main
Taraji P. Henson	Detective Jocelyn "Joss" Carter	Main	Main	Main	Guest	
Kevin Chapman	Detective Lionel Fusco	Main	Main	Main	Main	Main
Sarah Shahi	Sameen Shaw		Recurring	Main	Main	Main
Amy Acker	"Root"/Samantha "Sam" Groves/The Machine	Guest	Recurring	Main	Main	Main

=== John Reese ===
- Portrayed by Jim Caviezel
- Episodes: "Pilot" – "return 0"

John Reese is the name adopted by the former U.S. Army Special Forces soldier and Central Intelligence Agency (CIA) officer part of the Special Activities Center. He serves as Finch's armed enforcer to stop future crimes. Presumed dead following a failed CIA operation in China, Reese's real name is unknown. He was nicknamed "The Man in the Suit" by law enforcement, who knows him only in terms of the description given by witnesses.

=== Harold Finch ===
- Portrayed by Michael Emerson
- Episodes: "Pilot" – "return 0"

Harold Finch is a reclusive billionaire software engineer who built a machine that predicts future crimes and outputs either the victim's or perpetrator's Social Security number. He is known by a series of bird-themed aliases such as Harold Wren, Harold Crow, and Harold Swift. Finch is very secretive and highly conscious of digital security and has successfully erased his own digital footprint. A frequent companion of Finch is a dog named Bear (played by Graubaer's Boker, a 2013 and 2014 national champion working dog). Bear is a Belgian Malinois with military training who Reese rescues from Aryan Nationalists, who were using him as an attack dog.

=== Sameen Shaw ===
- Portrayed by Sarah Shahi
- Episodes: "Relevance" – "return 0"

Sameen Shaw is a former U.S. Marine, physician (emergency medicine) and a US Army ISA operative, first seen as an assassin working for "The Program", the section of the Government dealing with the "relevant" numbers found by The Machine (S2 Ep16, "Relevance"). Her ISA partner Cole begins to have doubts after one of their targets proves to be an engineer working for the government; the assassination is part of the cover-up that conceals the existence of The Machine. As a result, her employers targeted her and her partner and plan a trap to assassinate them. Shaw and Cole's numbers were given to Reese and Finch. That night, Cole is killed. Reese and Finch continue to try to help her and although she initially declines a couple of times, she ends up subsequently working with them on a regular basis. She likes dogs and buys Bear an expensive collar and other presents.

Shaw witnessed her father's death in an automobile accident at a young age but did not exhibit typical emotional reactions to it. In her first appearance, she claims that she has an Axis II Personality disorder and alexithymia, making her unable to feel and/or express common human emotions such as fear or sadness. Shaw attended Med School and once trained as a surgeon; although very technically capable, she was criticized by her superiors for her indifference and lack of sensitivity to her patients and it is implied that she was removed from the program before she could complete her surgical training because of the lack of these emotional characteristics. She is capable of deducing emotionally correct actions, such as rescuing Fusco's son rather than Fusco (S3 Ep9, "The Crossing") and taking on Genrika as her unofficial ward (S3 Ep5, "Razgovor"). She unexpectedly reveals a hint of emotion by passionately kissing Root before sacrificing herself to save the team (S4 Ep11, "If-Then-Else").

She is later revealed to be alive and is used by Samaritan to bait a trap for the team ("Asylum"). Greer then has Shaw subjected to over 7,000 simulations in an attempt to turn her on the team but Shaw is able to escape, killing Jeremy Lambert in the process ("Reassortment"). Shaw returns to New York a week later, but because of the number of simulations she went through, has a hard time distinguishing reality from simulation. Root is able to get her to rejoin the team, however, which now includes a fully knowledgeable Fusco ("Sotto Voce"). Following Finch's cover being blown, Shaw works with Root to protect him but is separated by a gunfight. She is later devastated in her own way to learn of Root's death ("The Day the World Went Away"). Following Root's death, the Machine reassigns Root's rotating identities to Shaw and she works with Reese and Fusco to stop a presidential assassination by domestic terrorists ("Synecdoche"). She then infiltrates Fort Meade with Reese to back up Finch in deploying the ICE-9 virus into Samaritan (".exe").

As the world falls apart from the ICE-9 virus, Shaw visits Root's grave in an attempt to say goodbye, but is unable to. She is then contacted by the Machine who uses Root's voice and She aids her in escaping a Samaritan ambush. During the final battle with Samaritan, Shaw works with Fusco to defend the Machine, capturing Samaritan agent Jeffrey Blackwell in the process. Shaw realizes Blackwell is Root's killer and shows her cold rage but she first decides to listen to the Machine. Before Shaw and Fusco leave the Machine per Her request, the Machine passes on a final message from Root to Shaw, who is able to finally say goodbye to Root. A few moments later Blackwell escapes after seriously wounding Fusco.

A week later, Shaw hunts down and kills Blackwell in revenge for Root. She then meets a recovering Fusco in a café, neither of them knowing if Reese or Finch survived. Shaw then takes Bear and walks down the street before being contacted by the Machine's copy, still using Root's voice, and smiles at a nearby camera ("return 0"). It appears that Shaw, chosen again as the Machine's Primary Asset and now also somewhat of an Analog Interface, will continue working numbers with the Machine.

=== Root ===
- Portrayed by Amy Acker
- Episodes: "Bad Code", "Firewall – "return 0"

Root, born Samantha "Sam" Groves, is a highly intelligent computer hacker and contract killer, obsessed with Finch and the Machine. Aside from her extraordinary intelligence, she has also displayed an uncanny ability in the use of firearms, a very high threshold for pain (S2 Ep2, "Bad Code", where she gets physically assaulted by Denton Weeks; S3 Ep12, "Aletheia", where she is severely tortured but not broken by Control) and a proficiency for social engineering. She has successfully posed as a high-end psychiatrist (S1 Ep23, "Firewall"), an assistant to the United States Special Counsel (S2 Ep15, "Booked Solid") and as a legitimate FBI agent (showing up in Lionel Fusco's New York City Police Department 8th Precinct with a legitimate warrant and an FBI badge, S3 Ep17, "Root Path").

She was raised in Bishop, Texas, where she lived until her mother's death. According to Sam, in discussions with Finch, her mother told her to "follow her talents" — and she was good at inflicting harm on others without guilt or remorse. As a child, computers made more sense to Sam than people, who she sees as "bad code", admitting she has been waiting her whole life for someone who shared her understanding of technology.

In 1991, Sam and her friend, Hanna Frey, were playing computer games in the local library until it closed for the day. After her friend left, Sam stayed a little longer successfully finishing The Oregon Trail. When she was ready to leave the library, she saw Hanna getting into a car that belonged to Trent Russell, a local man who was a member of the book club. She recognized his car and told the librarian, Barbara, (played by Margo Martindale), who later married Trent Russell, what she had seen. However, as Barbara was in love with Trent, she kept the information to herself to protect him, calling Sam a liar and an attention-seeker. This response further damaged Sam's faith in humanity. Two years after Hanna disappeared, Sam hacked into the bank account of a drug lord, and stole $100,000, using the money to frame Trent for the robbery, setting him up to be killed, as revenge for killing Hanna. Sam later moved out of Texas and became a professional assassin and ruthless hacker-for-hire under the alias "Root". Although she doesn't necessarily enjoy it, she has no qualms about torturing or murdering people to get whatever she wants.

She was hired by Pete Matheson to assassinate Congressman Michael Delancey. Through the use of a patsy, Scott Powell, Root was successful. However, her plan to kill Powell afterwards was foiled by John Reese. Ultimately, the operation fell apart as Reese took out one of her men and stole his phone while Finch provided a phone recording to the FBI proving Matheson's involvement. Realizing this, Root killed her client and staged it as a suicide out of guilt for his actions, exonerating Powell. Root cleared out of her location, the dorm room of an uninvolved college student away on winter break, before the FBI, acting on an "anonymous" tip (from Finch) could apprehend her. She had a brief instant message conversation with Finch, acknowledging him as a worthy opponent and said she was looking forward to the next time. She ended the conversation with "Harold", letting him know that she knew who he was.

As part of Root's plan to come face to face with Finch, Root anonymously contacted HR and put a hit on herself, using the pseudonym "Dr. Caroline Turing". Turing's Social Security number appeared through the Machine, making her a person of interest. Reese, discovering Turing was a psychologist, became one of her patients. Later that night, Turing was attacked by four assassins hired by Simmons. Reese managed to get her to safety in a hotel for the night, and the two were unknowingly caught on the FBI's radar. Under Donnelly's supervision, the FBI staged a full-scale assault on the hotel, while HR was trying to get to Turing. With the help of Joss Carter and Finch, Turing was led to a tunnel system under the hotel. Reese instructed her to find Finch at the end of the tunnel, while he was holding off the HR hit men. As Finch was confronted by Alicia Corwin regarding his involvement with the Machine, Root shot Corwin dead. Introducing herself as Root, she tells Harold they have a lot to talk about. Finch drove away at gunpoint, with Corwin's body left behind.

Planning to escape with Finch to Texas, Root stopped in Maryland where she gained access to Denton Weeks' house. She lured him there to overpower and question him about the whereabouts of the Machine. After he told her what she wanted to know, she shot him dead. She did not know that Reese had already tracked her down through her friend Hanna's case. While holding him captive, Root explained to Finch that she does not want to control the Machine but to "set it free" to usher in a posthuman future. At the train station, Reese managed to save Finch and Root escaped. She called him on his mobile phone later that day to thank him for solving Hanna's case and told him that she would be in touch.

Several months later, Root, to gain information, began working, as "Miss May", an assistant to the Special Counsel at the Office of Special Counsel. She continues to find information on the Machine's location and learns about the virus and "reset". She beats Decima to it and receives admin access of the Machine for 24 hours. However, by the time Root, Finch, Reese, and Shaw get to the place where the Machine was stored, She had already moved herself to unknown locations. Root, losing her purpose, is devastated and sent to a Stoneridge Hospital by Finch. While being kept there, the Machine contacts her and Root becomes chosen as the Machine's "Analog Interface". And after going through Machine's reformation project, she starts to work for the Machine and often times collaborates with Reese, Shaw, and Finch. She learns and changes her "bad code" ideology throughout S3 and in Root Path. ("/", 3x17) Throughout S3, she begins to fall in love with Shaw, who unknowingly becomes a part of the reason for Root's reformation. By the end of S3, she is technically full member of the team.

In Season 4, Root continues to work on little projects with the Machine, preparing for the big war with Samaritan. She continues to make attempts to convince Finch to be more of an active player against Samaritan. In "If-Then-Else," she loses Shaw who sacrifices herself to save her and the team. Root then goes on a warpath in search of Shaw for the rest of S4, partially going back to the version of herself before reformation. When the Machine tells Root to "stop" searching for Sameen, she shows disappointment and sadness, leaving the team with a goodbye. She comes back a couple months later and again helps the Machine preparing for the war. She learns that Shaw is still alive and is being kept somewhere in Samaritan's hands. She infiltrates Samaritan's base knowing it's a trap and as a result she is captured. The Machine releases her and Finch by making a deal with Samaritan: giving up the location of Herself. Root then works with Finch and Reese to protect the Machine from being killed by Samaritan and successfully migrates a copy of the Machine in a laptop and custom made suitcase Root prepared in advance.

Once the Machine is successfully decompressed, she and Finch work on debugging the Machine for 2 months. Once it's up and running an open system, the first thing she does is to search for Shaw but is disappointed to find that there were 0 search results. She and Finch get a copy of Samaritan's code and create a mini-clone of Samaritan to run simulations of the war. In "QSO", she finally is able to get the Machine's help to send a message to Shaw via a secret communication channel that is connected to all Samaritan facilities. Root's message, "4AF", stops Shaw from attempting to kill herself and leads her to re-plan an escape. Root finally reunites with Shaw after 11 months of separation in "Sotto Voce". However, in just a week after reunion, Root dies trying to protect Finch from being assassinated. The Machine then chooses Root's voice to talk to Finch and Shaw. The Machine later shows that She not only chose Root's voice but also as Her avatar/proxy in "Return 0". Root was chosen, again by the Machine and continues to "live as long as the Machine lives."

=== Lionel Fusco ===
- Portrayed by Kevin Chapman
- Episodes: "Pilot" – "return 0"

Lionel P. Fusco is a homicide detective who was previously working in the NYPD 51st Precinct Vice Squad. He has an ex-wife and a young son, Lee Fusco. Fusco was a member of the criminal organization HR, although he did it for personal loyalty rather than greed. John Reese gave him a chance for redemption. At first, John had to blackmail him with the death of a murdered fellow officer, but later he arranged for him to be transferred to the 8th Precinct Homicide Task Force where he worked with Carter. Gradually during the first season, Fusco became a loyal friend. Until the finale of the first season, he and Carter are unaware that they have both been helping Finch and Reese. Fusco remained unaware of the Machine's existence until "Sotto Voce". He calls everyone by nickname: "Wonder Boy", "Glasses", "Looney Tunes", and "Cocoa Puffs" are nicknames he uses for Reese, Finch, Shaw, and Root, respectively.

=== Joss Carter ===
- Portrayed by Taraji P. Henson
- Episodes: "Pilot" – "The Crossing", "Terra Incognita"

Jocelyn "Joss" Carter is a detective in the New York City Police Department (NYPD) 8th Precinct Homicide Task Force. She is a single mother of one son, Taylor, whom she is close to. Formerly a Second Lieutenant and an interrogator in the U.S. Army, she did two tours of duty, one in Iraq and one in Afghanistan. She passed the bar examination in 2004, but gave up practicing law to become a police officer. In 2005, she had graduated from the police academy and started working in the NYPD as a patrol officer. In 2008 she was promoted to a detective and since 2010, by then a Detective First Grade (the "technical track" equivalent of a Lieutenant) she has worked in the Homicide Task Force at the 8th Precinct. Carter crossed paths with homeless John Reese ("Pilot") following his encounter with a group of young men on a New York City subway, but she later reconnects with him as the mysterious "Man in the Suit". Carter is initially determined to apprehend Reese as a person of interest (a person not formally accused of a crime) even after Reese saves her and her son on separate occasions. However, when the CIA tries to assassinate Reese without due process, she gradually revises her views and starts helping Reese and Finch instead.

For nine episodes in season 3, Carter is demoted to a beat officer after the crime organization HR frames her for shooting an unarmed suspect at the end of season 2. This incident, and the death of two of her fellow detectives – Bill Szymanski and Cal Beecher – motivate her to go against HR and arrest its mastermind, Alonzo Quinn, without resorting to the vigilante justice of Reese and Finch. By doing so, she gains the restoration of her status as a detective. Tragically, soon afterwards, she is killed by Patrick Simmons, the last surviving member of HR, who was trying to ambush Reese. Her death sends Reese and Shaw on a bloody vengeance spree. During most of her screen time, she is unaware of the Machine's existence and does not know where the tips come from. Only after Carter's status as a detective is restored does she conclude that Finch must be receiving his info from a computer.

== Recurring characters ==
=== Friends and family of Team Machine ===
The following is a list of friends and relatives of Team Machine.

==== Jessica Arndt ====
Jessica Arndt (played by Susan Misner) was John Reese's ex-girlfriend and Peter Arndt's wife.

Jessica dated John Reese for approximately six months prior to September 2001 ("Pilot"). At this time, she was living in Tacoma, Washington ("Many Happy Returns"). While on a vacation in Mexico on September 11, 2001, Jessica jokingly asked Reese to quit the United States Army, unaware that he already had. Moments later, she witnessed the news coverage about the attacks on the World Trade Center ("Pilot").

Years later, Jessica ran into Reese at an airport, and he told her that he had found a new job. She told him that she was engaged to a man named Peter and was moving back East, though she would wait for him if he told her to. Without a response, Reese turned and left. ("Mission Creep"). Later on, while operating illegally in New York, Reese met with Peter, who was now married to Jessica, at a bar. As Jessica arrived, Kara convinced Reese to leave just before Peter could "introduce" her to him ("Blue Code").

Reese and Stanton are in Morocco interrogating a suspect. While Stanton is busy with the suspect, Reese receives a voicemail from Jessica, who sounds distraught. Reese calls Jessica back and Reese can tell something is wrong, something she is not telling him. He informs her that he will be in New York to see her the next day. However, Reese is denied leave, as he and Stanton are commissioned on a special assignment to China by Agent Snow.

Later that month, Peter assaulted and accidentally killed Jessica by bashing her head against their kitchen counter. He originally intended to call an ambulance, but later decided to cover up her death by staging a car accident.

After escaping from a trap set by his CIA handlers in China, Reese returned to the US and looked for Jessica. He went to the hospital she had worked at in New Rochelle to inquire about her, but discovered she had died two months prior. Without knowing it, he encountered Finch, using a wheelchair, in the hospital after learning the news. The Machine had been giving Finch Jessica's number over the years, but he had originally been unable to ascertain why it kept appearing. He eventually discovered that it was because she was living with someone who was an imminent threat to her. Jessica's death had a significant impact on Reese, leading him to alcoholism and contemplating suicide before his meeting with Finch ("Pilot").

Carter began investigating Jessica's death after the FBI invited her to help investigate Jessica's husband, whom they believed was murdered by Reese for owing money to a loan shark. Although the official autopsy report suggested Jessica's death was caused by a car accident, Carter's investigation leads her to discover Jessica was abused by her husband and was killed prior to the "accident". She also discover's Jessica's past relationship with Reese and destroys the evidence to keep the FBI from finding out.

==== Grace Hendricks ====
Grace R. Hendricks (played by Carrie Preston) was Finch's former fiancée who believed him to be dead.

Grace was born on April 12, 1969, in Columbia, South Carolina. In 1987, she enrolled in Rhode Island School of Design and graduated four years later with a Bachelor of Fine Arts, followed by a Master of Fine Arts from Yale University in 1994 ("The High Road"). She spent her college junior year in Venice, Italy ("Til Death").

While demonstrating the progress of the Machine to Nathan Ingram, Harold Finch was directed by the computer to Grace, who was painting in a park. Finch assumed the Machine's direction of him to her was a glitch ("The High Road").

After seemingly correcting the glitch, and returning to the park on another day while she was painting, the Machine directed Finch to Grace again. Harold discovered that, because he had asked the Machine to direct him to people who had characteristics one would not expect, it had directed him to Grace because she was the only person in the park who had no "dark secrets", plus with her interest for Charles Dickens ("The High Road").

In January, Grace was painting in the park again when Harold approached her eating an ice cream cone. He asked her if she wanted one, too ("The High Road"). They started dating soon after. On her birthday in April, Finch sent her on a scavenger hunt taking her to the Guggenheim Museum where he surprised her with her favorite painting ("Til Death").

In 2010, Finch proposed to Grace. He later tells Ingram about it, as well ("Zero Day"). After the bombing that killed Ingram and injured Finch, Grace comes to the hospital looking for him. Finch realizes that if the government finds out that Finch is alive, they will kill him and Grace, as well. Concerned for Grace's safety, Finch pretends that he is dead and leaves the hospital ("God Mode").

Grace is working as a cover illustrator for The Boroughs magazine. She keeps a photograph of herself and Harold in her living room unaware that he is watching her from afar in order to protect her from the people protecting the machine. It is implied that, even though her work as a non-digital illustrator is falling out of practice in modern culture, Harold has been assuring that she will always have work through his many business connections ("No Good Deed").

In 2013, Grace is chased by Decima Technologies in order to get at Finch. She is eventually captured and traded for Finch. During the trade, Grace stumbles and is caught by Finch, but because she's blindfolded, remains unaware of just who helped her. She later leaves for a new life in Italy arranged by Finch. ("Beta")

In 2016, the Machine simulated that in a world where it never existed, Finch would've never met Grace. (".exe")

In 2016, after Samaritan is destroyed, Finch tracks Grace down in Italy where she is painting in a public location. Grace is shocked to see Finch but visibly pleased. ("return 0")

==== Nathan Ingram ====
Nathan C. Ingram (played by Brett Cullen) is Harold Finch's deceased collaborator and business partner who co-created the Machine, and died under circumstances not known until "God Mode". Ingram is the founder of IFT and acted as the interface between the government and their company while the Machine was under development.

Ingram was born on June 16, 1962, in Freeport, Texas. He enrolled at the Massachusetts Institute of Technology (MIT) in 1980 and left with an incomplete Bachelor of Science degree in computer science in 1983 ("The High Road").

He founded his company in 1983 ("The High Road") along with his best friend and MIT classmate Harold Finch (known to him as Harold Wren), who disguised himself as an ordinary employee ("Ghosts").

On September 11, Ingram visits Finch while he is working on a new program, in order to break the tragic news of the terrorist attack on the World Trade Center earlier that day. As they both watch the news in shock, Ingram tells Finch that while they have changed as they aged, the world has not until this moment. Ingram proposes that they try to change the world for the better ("One Percent").

Ingram at some point made contact with the U.S. Government to build the Machine. Ingram acted as the public face of IFT and was the man with whom the government dealt, keeping up the facade that he alone was building the Machine, while in fact, Finch covertly began building it.

On June 10, 2002, following another ceremony, and after dismissing half of his company's staff, Ingram arrived at an abandoned office floor in the building, and discovered Finch's progress with the Machine. Supplied with the feeds from the NSA, the Machine could track and listen to all the citizens of New York. Finch told Ingram the next step would be teaching the Machine to pick out the terrorists from the general population ("Ghosts").

Ingram met with Alicia Corwin, a government worker who supplied the Machine's various feeds. Corwin requested information regarding the progress of the Machine, and Ingram handed her the Social Security number of a DIA agent. The agent was later found to have been in collusion with the Iranian government to sell weapons-grade uranium. After meeting with Denton Weeks to discuss the fact that the Machine could not track specific people, Weeks threatened to reduce the payment for the Machine. He was dismayed to find that Ingram was providing it for a minuscule one US dollar. Ingram later celebrated with Finch about the Machine's success in discovering a traitor and got a closer look at how the Machine operated. It was at this time that the Machine considered Ingram as the subject of a potential threat ("Super").

Ingram learns of the Machine's programming to ignore any "irrelevant" crimes; any attacks of a smaller scale than those that present a threat to the nation. Every night at midnight, the Machine would erase the list of potential crimes. Clearly disturbed by this piece of information, Ingram stood by as Finch stated that the Machine was not built to save "someone", but rather "everyone" ("Ghosts").

Ingram came to realize that the people who were to receive the Machine were not entirely trustworthy. During a meeting with Alicia Corwin, he accidentally let slip that eight people knew about the Machine rather than seven. Later, he tried to convince Finch to make a back door into the machine, only for Finch to refuse. Just prior to shipping the Machine, Ingram used his administrative access to install a new function named "contingency". After creating the back door, the Machine was relocated to its new home ("No Good Deed").

After the Machine is shipped out on a freight train, Ingram meets with Finch in their now empty laboratory. Finch and Ingram get into an argument that the Machine does not save enough lives, and Finch responds that the Machine is gone. Ingram implies he built a back door into it, which angers Finch as they had agreed not to. He tells Ingram that they agreed not to play God, but Ingram reveals that he is not proud of that agreement. Finch argues that they did what they set out to do, and that "either we move onto the next thing together, or we don't" ("One Percent").

Ingram leaves the meeting and the Machine sends him the number of a woman named Anna Sanders. Ingram researches and follows her, discovering that she has a restraining order out against her ex-boyfriend because of domestic violence. While watching her from his car one night, he sees a suspicious looking man with a hood and hat concealing his face. Ingram pulls out a pistol and gets ready to follow them ("One Percent").

In 2010, Finch confronts Ingram about the Contingency, and once again tells him that they can not be playing God. He shuts down the back door and lets the irrelevant list be deleted. Later, they agree to meet up on a ferry. Unknown to them, government assassin Hersh has brought in a terrorist named Asif, who is a suicide bomber. He has explosives in his van, and as Ingram greets Finch, the bombs detonate, killing Ingram and severely injuring Finch, which is the reason behind his present-day injuries that force him to limp and make him unable to turn his head. Finch goes to access the irrelevant list and is horrified to find that Nathan was part of it. He begins to consider that his friend's idea was not so crazy after all, and reopens the back door that allows him access to the irrelevant list ("God Mode").

==== Will Ingram ====
William "Will" Ingram (played by Michael Stahl-David) is Nathan Ingram's son. After his father's death, Will began to delve into what kind of work his father was working on.

Will managed to unearth the name of Alicia Corwin, an employee of the White House who dealt with his father. Will met with Corwin outdoors and asked her about the Machine as well as the one dollar transaction. She claimed that IFT was on the verge of bankruptcy and that Corwin struck a deal for Ingram's patents. Upon her telling him to let it go, he claimed she sounded just like his "Uncle Harold". Spooked, she ended the meeting and fled.

Unsatisfied with what he found, Will got an offer to work in Sudan to continue his health services. Accepting, he bade farewell to Finch and left ("Wolf and Cub").

==== Taylor Carter ====
Taylor Carter (played by Kwoade Cross) is Detective Joss Carter's teenaged son, he was kidnapped by Carl Elias after his mom started an investigation into him but was later freed by John Reese. He was sent away to live with his father when his mom decided to go after the HR organization.

==== Lee Fusco ====
Lee Fusco (played by Sean McCarthy) is Detective Lionel Fusco's son, he was held hostage by HR when Fusco refused to say where Carter and Reese (who had kidnapped the head of HR) were. Sameen Shaw managed to save him in time but had to sacrifice saving Fusco, but he had luckily managed to get free by himself.

==== Daniel Casey ====
Daniel Casey (played by Joseph Mazzello) is a computer hacker who becomes an asset of the Machine. After uncovering and stealing part of the Machine's code in 2010, he is labelled a traitor and becomes a target of both Decima and CIA agents John Reese and Kara Stanton. Casey is eventually confronted by Reese, who ultimately lets him escape and go into hiding.

He is later found by Root and he helps reprogram seven computer servers so that he and the other assets of the Machine can hide in plain sight when Samaritan goes online.

==== Jason Greenfield ====
Jason Greenfield (played by Michael Esper) is a computer hacker and former member of Vigilance who becomes an asset of the Machine. With Vigilance after him, the CIA fakes Greenfield's death and he is secretly held at a black site awaiting rendition. Root and Shaw manage to free him and then send him into hiding to await the Machine's orders.

He is later called upon by Root and helps reprogram seven computer servers so that he and the other assets of the Machine can hide in plain sight when Samaritan goes online.

==== Daizo ====
Daizo (played by Alex Shimizu) is an asset of the Machine who was recruited by Root. He helps reprogram seven computer servers so that he and the other assets of the Machine can hide in plain sight when Samaritan goes online.

==== Romeo ====
Romeo (played by Andreas Damm) is the leader of a group of thieves that covertly use an online dating app to recruit new members. Bored with her cover identity as a department store cosmetics counter employee, the Machine helps Shaw become the getaway driver for Romeo's gang of thieves. Despite many successful heists, she is eventually forced to quit when Romeo and his men nearly get her arrested. Later, he is found and tortured by Martine Rousseau for information about Shaw's identity.

=== Persons of Interest ===
This is a list of characters who were in danger and helped out by Team Machine. They become allies to the Team in future episodes.

==== Zoe Morgan ====
Zoe Morgan (played by Paige Turco) is a fixer who specializes in crisis management and a possible love interest of John Reese, whom Reese and Finch helped save. She returns the favor by helping them out with persons of interest that require her skills.

Morgan grew up in a nice house in Yonkers, New York. Her father was a city official who got ensnared in a corruption case. The press camped out on her lawn for weeks, only dispersing when a man the party had sent to "fix" things showed up. This was what prompted her to become a fixer. She spent the rest of her childhood in a small apartment in Queens with her mother.

When Zoe's number came up, Reese took a job as her driver to investigate. Zoe was hired by Mark Lawson, the CFO of Virtanen Pharmaceuticals, to retrieve an incriminating recording, purportedly revealing an affair. When she returned it to his men, they attempted to kill her, but she was saved by Reese's intervention.

Using her own sources, independent of Reese and Finch, Zoe figured out that the woman in the recording was Dana Miller, a former employee of Virtanen, who was going to blow the whistle about one of their drugs and was killed for her trouble. She chose to take down Virtanen with her information because she knew a girl once whose situation "kind of reminds [her] of Dana" (and only partially because they tried to kill her).

When she and Reese were captured, Zoe appeared to betray him with a kiss, but used the opportunity to slip him a paper clip so that he could escape his handcuffs. She led Mark Lawson to a navy yard, but he figured out that she had never really sent the recording to anyone else. Before he could do anything with this information, Reese showed up to rescue Zoe.

She gave Virtanen's competitor Beecher Pharmaceuticals a tip about the drug, then donated a large sum of the money she earned to Dana Miller's family for their lawsuit against Virtanen.

Zoe helps Reese and Finch again when Finch calls upon her to help him solve a case. She helps Finch and Reese clear the name of a man framed for murder. At the end of the episode, she sees Mr. Reese briefly and flirtatiously suggests he might consider buying her a drink as payment for her services.

She later comes to the rescue again while investigating a hit on a professional therapist through HR, but too late. She is the one who discovers that the therapist, Caroline Turing, is really "Root," and therefore the perpetrator, framing herself as the victim. She tells Finch to be careful because she would hate if anything happened to their "mutual friend", Mr. Reese.

After Finch is rescued from Root, Zoe once again assists Reese with his latest person of interest, Maxine Angelis, by posing to be one of John's ex-girlfriends. Maxine recognizes her and commented that every reporter in town would love to interview her. Maxine later had John call her in regards to finding out who the head of HR is and gave them information on two former Federal Bureau of Investigation (FBI) agents who are working for him.

Zoe is called upon again, but this time to pose as John's wife while living in the suburbs. While "married" to John they played poker and kept an eye on Graham Wyler.

After Zoe helps John and Harold spot an assassin targeting a maid in a hotel and the danger has ended, John invites Zoe to stay with him in the penthouse suite as Harold has bought the hotel and they can spend some time together.

==== Leon Tao ====
Leon Tao (Ken Leung) is a former forensic accountant and financial criminal, as well as a three-time person of interest, who has assisted Reese and Finch in some cases. Leon was targeted to die by the Aryan Brotherhood and the Russian Mafia and is saved both times by the timely intervention of Reese and Finch. Tao returns the favor by helping them out with persons of interest that require his skills.

After receiving a Master of Business Administration from New York University, Tao began working as an accountant at the firm of Bear Stearns, until he was downsized when the firm was sold to JPMorgan Chase when the recession hit. He then took a job at what he believed was a small start-up business, which was in fact the corporate arm of the Aryan Brotherhood, and he was laundering money from their methamphetamine sales.

The Machine produced his number after he stole eight million dollars from his employers and lost a large portion of it in the stock market. It is hard to say how much he actually lost, as he repeatedly lied about the actual amount. Tao took one million in bearer bonds and attempted to run away. He was captured by operatives of the Aryan Brotherhood, but Reese helped him escape ("The Contingency").

Tao's number came up again after he got involved in gold farming and subsequently found himself in trouble with the Russian Mafia. Reese took care of the assailants after they threw Tao through a window. Tao was then blindfolded and brought to the Library, because Reese did not know how else to protect him while he and Finch were out saving another number.

Tao eventually made himself useful by helping Finch track down the people threatening Madeleine. He also made friends with Bear by sharing a bowl of instant noodles with him. After he successfully assisted Finch and Reese, he told them that he was not the kind of guy to let them down ("Critical").

Tao posed as an emergency medical technician to help Finch and Reese "abduct" Sameen Shaw after she was supposedly murdered by Hersh ("Relevance").

==== Harper Rose ====
Harper Rose (played by Annie Ilonzeh) a drifter and opportunistic con artist who first appears as a person of interest when she tries to independently double-cross both a drug cartel and The Brotherhood. At the end of the episode "Skip", it is revealed that The Machine is starting to anonymously use her as an asset. In "Synecdoche", it's revealed that Harper has become part of a second team working for the Machine in Washington, D.C. with former persons of interest Joey Durban and Logan Pierce.

==== Caleb Phipps ====
Caleb Phipps (played by Luke Kleintank) is a computer genius, and an irrelevant number in Season 2. Originally a high school student hiding his true genius, Caleb is protected by Finch and Fusco while Reese is locked up. Finch discovers that Caleb is writing a revolutionary compression algorithm and is secretly a drug lord, but the true danger to Caleb proves to be Caleb himself who is suicidal following the accidental death of his older brother. Finch talks the young man out of suicide and he returns in Season 4 as the head of a tech company Root goes to work at. Finch and Root later attempt to steal Caleb's algorithm to save the Machine from destruction, but he provides them with it as thanks for Finch saving his life. Root also takes some of Caleb's experimental hard drives to store the Machine's core code on.

==== Logan Pierce ====
Logan Pierce (played by Jimmi Simpson) is an eccentric genius and billionaire who created a social networking site called Friendsczar. In season 2 he is an irrelevant number whom Reese is trying to protect from a potential threat. Logan proves to be surrounded by multiple people who want him dead, including his lawyer and his own best friend. After the threat is eliminated, Logan is removed as CEO of his company, but decides to go into business with his rival instead. Reese realizes that Logan knew about the threat from his friend the whole time, but didn't warn Reese as he wanted to see how Reese works. Logan presents Reese with an expensive watch as a gift that is accurate to the nanosecond, but Finch smashes it and uncovers a hidden tracking device. Finch and Reese realize that Logan is just curious enough to be dangerous, especially with his bottomless pockets and endless need to know things. Logan is reclassified by the Machine as "threat to Admin" as a result. Finch later gives the watch Logan gave them to Lou Mitchell so that he can fix it up and sell it to get the money Lou needs to buy his favorite diner.

Logan returns in season 5 where he is mentioned on the news as refusing to give the government access to his clients' personal data. Logan helps Reese get into a function by buying him a fifty thousand dollar ticket, claiming that he is "championing a new cause," but his presence during a thwarted terrorist attack and Logan's subsequent disappearance cause Reese to suspect Logan as the culprit. After Reese, Shaw and Fusco thwart a Presidential assassination, they meet with Logan, Harper Rose and Joey Durban who reveal that they are working for the Machine as another team fighting crime, the new cause Logan had previously mentioned. While Team Machine was assigned to protect the relevant number of the President, Logan's team was given the irrelevant number of Reese's cover identity and positioned themselves strategically to help out. In Logan's case, along with getting Reese into the function, he knocked out power to the house being used as the terrorists' base of operations, allowing Shaw and Fusco to take them down and anonymously alerted the Secret Service to the threat. Logan provides the team with a traffic camera picture of the missing Finch before departing with Harper and Joey to take care of their next number.

==== Joey Durban ====
Joey Durban (played by James Carpinello) is a former member of the US Army and one of the first numbers investigated by Reese. Feeling guilty for the death of a friend overseas, Joey joins a gang of robbers whose leader eventually kills the members after promising them profitable retirements. While working with the gang, Joey helps to steal the file on the murder of gang boss Carl Elias' mother and is saved from death by Reese. Joey is then convinced by Reese to leave to find a new life with his fiancé Pia. In the fifth season, Joey returns as Team Machine protects the President of the United States from an attempted assassination. Joey reveals that he has since turned his life around and married Pia, but Reese is forced to brush him off. After the assassination is stopped, Joey, dressed in an army uniform, rescues Reese and Shaw from three of the terrorists and provides them uniforms to use to escape. Joey, Harper Rose and Logan Pierce are then revealed to be working for the Machine as a second team who were sent the irrelevant number of Reese's cover identity while Team Machine were sent the relevant number of the President and depart to chase after their next number while Reese, Shaw and Fusco go after the missing Finch.

=== Organised Crime figures ===
==== Carl Elias ====
Carl G. Elias (played by Enrico Colantoni), also known as Charlie Burton, is a nascent crime boss and the illegitimate son of Mafia don Gianni Moretti. Elias is determined to revive the crime families of New York City and to eliminate the Russian mob, with the assistance of HR.

In 1981, a young Carl Elias was implied to have been living with a foster family. He was being treated for wounds sustained during a fight which broke out after he was called a bastard due to his lack of a father. He asked his foster mother if she was willing to help him research his father, but she asked him to let it go ("Flesh and Blood").

In 1991, Elias formally met his father, Don Gianni Moretti, at a restaurant. Moretti recognized his son and promised Elias a place in his organization as long as he remained loyal, tenacious, and capable.

Later, Elias found out that Moretti double-crossed him and had ordered his execution. Before he could be executed, Elias fought back. He managed to kill his executioners and escape, though he sustained a wound which later scarred his hands after grabbing razor wire meant for his throat.

Elias first showed up on Reese and Finch's radar when he had Sam Latimer have his men, including an undercover John Reese, retrieve a file titled "Elias, M." Latimer delivered the file to him, but to cover his trail, Elias had him killed and fled.

After Elias acquired the file, he found the name of the man who killed his mother and sought revenge on Vincent DeLuca. Elias went to Vincent's house and stabbed him to death with the same knife he used to kill Elias' mother, Marlene Elias. Later when Elias realized that the detective investigating the case was on his trail, he went to retired detective Bernie Sullivan's house and killed him. Unfortunately for Elias, Detective Carter was on her way, and a shootout occurred where Elias' blood was left at the scene.

Reese came into direct contact with Elias for the first time while Elias was pretending to be Charlie Burton, a school teacher trying to avoid getting killed by a rival Russian crime family. Although Elias was to be murdered, Reese was unaware that Elias was a murderer himself. He and Reese became friends while trying to escape from the men that were after Elias. When Reese and Elias succeeded, Elias turned on Reese. Elias captured one of the sons of the rival family that was after him and shot him in the leg. He then forced Reese to tie himself up and left the scene. He was later seen escaping with his men as he expressed his goal to reunite the five crime families of New York City.()

Elias was a main suspect when Detective Carter's number came in from the Machine. It was revealed he was indirectly involved by hiring her confidential informant to complete the hit. Elias left a vase of flowers on Carter's desk with a message mourning her loss and stole a file marked Elias from her desk.

Carl Elias resurfaced after Reese called him using a phone left in a trash can by Anthony "Scarface" Marconi who was impersonating a police officer.

Upon his father's release from prison, Elias ordered some of his men to kidnap his father. His plan failed when Carter and Reese intervened and took Moretti into protective custody. Reese later called Elias, requesting his help to find a child kidnapped by an Eastern European gang. Elias agreed to help but threatened the child himself once Reese had found her. Reese was forced to give up Moretti's location in exchange for the child's life, and Elias let them both go. Although Reese tried to save Moretti, Elias succeeded in capturing his father.

Elias's plan to unite the five families required him to kill the five Dons. He recruited HR, a cabal of corrupt cops, and used them to help him take down the Dons. After killing one Don with a car bomb planted by Scarface and gunning one Don down in front of Carter, Detectives Carter and Fusco took the remaining three into protective custody, barely escaping Elias's men. Elias then personally went to where they were hiding out with some HR cops and ordered the kidnapping of Taylor Carter. He was unaware however, that Harold Finch had shown Officer Simmons, an HR cop, photos of Elias's men watching the families of HR cops. The HR cops severed their ties with Elias and several clean police officers came to the hideout. Carl Elias was forced to surrender.

After being processed and put in jail, Elias made one final phone call to Gianni Moretti, telling his father he wished he could be there to see. Moretti's car was then blown up by Scarface, killing Moretti and his legitimate son Gianni Moretti, Jr. Elias hung up the phone with a slight grin.

Several weeks later, Elias received a visit from Finch who asked for his help in one of their cases involving several mafia groups and hit men. Being thankful that Finch and Reese had saved his life, Elias took advantage of his power even from behind bars and helped them. In return, he asked Finch to play chess with him.

After several more weeks of living at Rikers Island, Elias noticed that Reese had been arrested on suspicion of being "The Man in the Suit". He told Reese that he knew all about FBI's investigation and that he would help Reese in any way that he could. When Reese is dumped into the general population in an attempt to get him to reveal his true identity, he is attacked by an inmate and because Reese could not fight back, Elias broke up the fight.

When HR attempts to have the Russians kill Elias, Carter rescues him from the trap and helps him to a secure location. She keeps his presence quiet as she goes to him for information. Elias helps Carter take down HR by setting the Russians against the dirty cops, but she rejects his offer to just kill everyone for her. After Carter is murdered by Simmons, Elias pays the debt by having Simmons executed in his hospital bed as he watches.

Throughout season 4, Elias is at war with Dominic Cordell and the Brotherhood. Due to their own war with Samaritan, the Team is unable to help him much and his best friend Anthony dies. Elias is later captured by the Brotherhood along with Reese, Fusco and Harper Rose. Fusco is able to escape, but Dominic prepares to execute Elias and Harper. Elias is saved when the Machine puts Reese into God Mode, enabling him to escape and take down the Brotherhood. The Brotherhood and Elias are arrested by officers led by Fusco, but one of Elias' men intercepts his transport van and attempts to help him escape. A standoff ensues with Dominic that ends with him surrendering to Fusco moments before both Dominic and Elias are shot by a Samaritan sniper as part of the Correction, killing Dominic and leaving Elias' fate unknown.

In "B.S.O.D." its stated that Elias is dead. In "ShotSeeker", Elias' old friend Bruce Moran attempts to avenge him only to learn that Elias is still alive. Elias is revealed to be recovering at Finch's safe house where Fusco took him after saving his life. The bedridden Elias, now aware of at least Samaritan, attempts to convince Moran to go back into hiding but Moran refuses.

Over the following episodes, Elias continues to recover from his wounds, appearing to all the world like he is dead. In "Reassortment", after learning of Bruce Moran's death, Elias supplies Fusco with a lead on a case he is working. He is later confronted by Finch for his actions and tells Finch he needs to let Fusco in on the truth. In "Sotto Voce", Finch enlists Elias' help to track down the elusive criminal mastermind known as "the Voice." Elias agrees to help in exchange for going along as protection as the Team are the only friends he has left. With Elias' help, Finch tracks down "the Voice's" hideout only to learn that he's their person of interest, Terry Easton. As Easton holds a gun on Finch, Elias intervenes and threatens Easton into backing down. The two men allow Easton to drive away before Elias detonates a bomb on Easton's getaway car, killing him. Elias then implies that Finch brought him along to kill Easton as he had to know what Elias would do.

In "The Day the World Went Away", Finch's cover is blown and Elias offers to protect him while the Team goes on the offensive against Samaritan. Elias takes Finch to the apartment buildings Reese protected him in when they first met and the two reminisce. However, Samaritan figures out where they are and sends agents. With the help of Elias' men stationed through the building, the two escape outside where they find Elias' driver has been murdered. Moments later, Elias is shot in the head and killed by a Samaritan agent as he attempts to protect Finch. After being called to the scene of Elias' death, Reese removes Elias' glasses and closes his eyes as a sign of respect towards Elias. He is then approached by a gang member with information on the car that took Finch as the gang member respected Elias and Elias respected Finch. The information Reese is given enables Root and Shaw to rescue Finch.

==== Anthony Marconi ====
Anthony S. "Scarface" Marconi (played by David Valcin) is a member of Elias's mob group, and is his second-in-command and principal enforcer. He is also informally known as Scarface due to an easily identifiable scar on his right cheek coupled with the fact that his name is never mentioned by any of the characters in any episode he appears in. Marconi is mistaken by many to be a HR officer. He actually only works for Elias, and his police jacket is a disguise.

When his boss, Carl Elias, was on the run from a rival mob (the Yogorovs led by Ivan Yogorov) Marconi disguised himself as a police officer. While he gathered information on his boss' whereabouts, Harold Finch became suspicious of him and started following him, thinking that he might actually be Elias.

When Elias had finally escaped the Russian mob with the help of John Reese, Marconi rendezvoused with his boss by knocking out Fusco who was waiting to intercept Reese and Elias. Later, Marconi killed Ivan Yogorov and was with Elias as he expressed his desire to reunite the five families.

Marconi resurfaced by again impersonating a police officer and dropping a burner phone in a trash can for Reese and Carter to find. Marconi also killed a corrupt Security and Exchange Commission investigator who he'd taken into "custody".

Marconi was present when Reese met with Elias in order to get information on a kidnapper who had taken a baby. Elias agreed to help and had Marconi escort Reese to the location where the baby would be offloaded to be shipped to Eastern Europe. After Reese rescued the child, Marconi ambushed him and brought him back to Elias. Marconi personally took the child to Elias for use as leverage to get the location of Gianni Moretti from Reese. Marconi then severely injured Moretti's police guard Bill Szymanski and took Moretti captive.

Marconi was responsible for a car bomb that killed one of the five dons of the New York crime families in plain view of Reese. He later informed Elias that the remaining Dons had been taken into protective custody by Detectives Carter and Fusco. Marconi then kidnapped Carter's son Taylor from school on Elias's orders; shooting it out with Reese before escaping with Taylor captive. Marconi again fought with Reese during Reese's rescue attempt of Taylor and successfully escaped once more, though both Taylor and Moretti were rescued.

Despite his employer now being imprisoned, Marconi continued his duties and planted a bomb in a car that killed both Gianni Moretti and his legitimate son Gianni Moretti, Jr.

Simmons and Fusco later met with Marconi to have him get Elias to bring back HR; however, Marconi told them in order for that to happen they had to bring Elias the last of the original dons. Despite attempts to capture the last don, the remaining members of HR failed to do this since the don was now working with Elias.

Later in the series, he is captured, along with Elias, by Dominic ("Mini") Besson, the leader of a rival gang trying to gain control, who has killed or turned several of Elias's men and now demands the combination for a vault in Bruce Moran's office. After cautioning Dominic's second-in-command about the ability to remain in stable power and trust Dominic, he watches on as Dominic relays the numbers (which were told to him by Elias) and as Link's man opens the vault, which then triggers an explosion that blows up the entire floor they are on, killing Marconi in the process. Dominic and his second-in-command escape, but lose some of their men in the process. Later, when Elias is again captured by Dominic, to avenge Scarface's death, he plays a mind-game with Dominic to get him to believe his #2, Link, has betrayed him. Dominic kills Link before he realizes it was a trick.

==== Bruce Moran ====
Bruce Moran (played by James LeGros) Elias' accountant and close friend of both him and Anthony Marconi from boyhood. He is eventually killed by Samaritan agents and discovered by Fusco in a dumping ground for Samaritan victims. The killer is later revealed to be FBI Agent Martin LeRoux who is in reality a Samaritan agent.

==== Gianni Moretti ====
Don Gianni F. Moretti, Sr. (played by Mark Margolis) was a mob boss who was a father to both Gianni Moretti Jr. and Carl Elias. As Elias was born out of wedlock and during an affair Moretti Sr. denied he existed and even tried to have him killed when he was sought out by his illegitimate son. He was killed along with Moretti Jr. in a car bomb set off by Elias's main enforcer Anthony Marconi (a.k.a. Scarface).

==== Peter Yogorov ====
Peter I. Yogorov (Played by Morgan Spector) is the leader of Russian Mafia, who in the first 3 seasons was Elias's main enemy. The Russian Mafia was originally run by Ivan Yogorov, Peter's father, until he was killed by, Elias's enforcer, Anthony Marconi so that Elias could take over Brighton Beach. Peter was freed from Prison by HR but also has a brother, Laszlo Yogorov, who is currently still incarcerated at Rikers Island.

=== The Brotherhood ===
The following characters are involved in the Brotherhood drug gang storyline:

==== Dominic Besson ====
Dominic Besson (played by Winston Duke) also known as "Mini" (as he is quite big) is leader of the Brotherhood. When he was first introduced he was hiding as his own lackey to prove that people underestimate him. He soon becomes Carl Elias's main enemy. After Reese defeats the Brotherhood using God Mode, Dominic is arrested by Fusco and the NYPD. He is later killed by a Samaritan sniper as part of the Correction.

==== Link Cordell ====
Lincoln "Link" Cordell (played by Jamie Hector) a violent gang member who acts as Dominic's right-hand-man. He was at one point arrested by Detective John Riley (Reese's new cover identity) but Dominic paid for someone to take the fall for Link and he is released. Link is later killed by Dominic after Elias tricks him into thinking that Link betrayed Dominic.

==== Floyd ====
Floyd (played by Jessica Pimentel), another of Dominic's higher-ups, often appearing in place of Link. It is assumed that she is arrested with the remaining Brotherhood members by Detective Lionel Fusco and the rest of NYPD.

=== New York City Police Department ===
==== Cal Beecher ====
New York City Police Department Narcotics Detective Calvin T. Beecher (played by Sterling K. Brown) is a narcotics detective who works at Carter's precinct, whom Carter has begun a relationship with.

He helps Carter with the Drakes case ("Til Death"). He later asks Carter out on a date when she says that she owes him a favor for helping her with the case. She agrees to go out with him.

Beecher is Alonzo Quinn's godson and gives his godfather information ("Shadow Box"). It is unknown if Beecher is aware of Quinn's activities.

Later, when Carter receives a job offer with the FBI pending a polygraph, she is turned down because of her relationship with Beecher. The FBI tells her that Beecher is currently under investigation ("Booked Solid").

In "Trojan Horse", it is revealed that Beecher is the godson of HR leader Alonzo Quinn. Realizing Beecher knows too much about his involvement in HR, Quinn orders his godson killed. He chases after some drug dealers, only to be led into a trap, and then a shootout involving him and some HR men. The Machine produces Beecher's number too late, and he is killed within the shooting. Carter arrives at the scene and is severely devastated to find her friend dead, especially as Fusco cleared him of any involvement in Bill Szymanski's death.

Following Beecher's murder, part of Carter's motivation for taking down HR is revenge. In "Endgame", with the help of Finch, Carter is able to record Alonzo Quinn confessing to ordering Beecher's murder and he is arrested for it along with all of his other crimes.

==== Bill Szymanski ====
New York City Police Department Detective Bill Szymanski (played by Michael McGlone) is a police detective in the organized crime division at NYPD 8th Precinct who assisted Carter with a mob murder committed by Carl Elias ("Witness", "Baby Blue").

He is an honest cop, that Carter entrusted with the job of guarding Gianni Moretti, Elias' father. Ultimately, Reese had to reveal Moretti's location to Elias in order to save a person of interest, and Szymanski was severely injured in the line of duty and taken to the hospital. Fortunately, he survived ("Baby Blue", "Identity Crisis").

Szymanski fully recovered and went back to active duty where he worked on the investigation of the murder of George Massey's son, who was killed by Riley Cavanaugh ("Triggerman").

Later, Szymanski and the assistant district attorney are meeting with Alonzo Quinn about testifying against the Yogorov mob family. Since HR is in ties with the Yogorovs, Quinn kills Szymanski and the ADA in order to keep them from testifying ("All In").

In a simulated world where the Machine never existed, Szymanski is still alive and a part of the NYPD's Homicide Task Force.

==== Joseph Soriano ====
New York City Police Department Detective Joseph Soriano (played by Ned Eisenberg) is an Internal Affairs Division detective who twice investigates Lionel Fusco. He first appears in (2.20 "In Extremis") when he investigates information from a jailhouse informant that links Fusco to the disappearance of Narcotics detective James Stills. Fusco feigns ignorance about the fate of the detective, but Soriano seems to get concrete proof when cadaver dogs signal the location of a body at a spot where Fusco's vehicle was on the night of Stills' disappearance. He takes Fusco to the spot, but is shocked when he finds that someone has dug up and removed the body. With no more evidence and the recantation of the informant, he is forced to drop the investigation and Fusco is allowed to return to duty.

(5.1 "BSOD") Soriano is part of a joint investigation with FBI Special Agent Martin LeRoux that is looking into Fusco's version of the circumstances of the deaths of Dominic and Carl Elias. LeRoux, a Samaritan operative, doctors the official reports and Fusco is cleared of any wrongdoing. Visibly upset with the verdict, Soriano is last seen leaving the 8th Precinct. Later, another IAD detective tells Fusco that Soriano has suddenly died of a heart attack. It is implied that he was actually killed by Samaritan to prevent any further investigations into events that transpired during the "Correction."

==== Kane ====
New York City Police Department Homicide Detective Kane (played by Anthony Mangano) is a police detective who sometimes shares his cases with Carter.

==== Dani Silva ====
New York City Police Department Detective Dani Silva (played by Adria Arjona) is an Internal Affairs Division detective who is undercover trying to find a mole in the NYPD Cadet program when she becomes a Person of Interest. She finds the mole, but is framed for her handlers' murder at the hands of a criminal gang called The Brotherhood. Reese is able to help her clear her name. She later transfers into the NYPD Gang Division, where she and Fusco work together to investigate another Person of Interest.

=== HR ===
The following characters are involved in the HR storyline, in which a group of corrupt police officers work in collaboration with an up-and-coming mob boss to control organized crime in New York.

==== Alonzo Quinn ====
Alonzo D. Quinn (played by Clarke Peters) is a political adviser for New York City councilman and mayoral candidate Ed Griffin (Richard V. Licata) and the leader of HR. Quinn's leadership is subtle enough that only Harold Finch even suspects that HR still has someone in charge.

With many of his subordinates arrested by the FBI, Quinn tricks a local reporter, Maxine Angelis, into thinking that Christopher Zambrano is the head of HR. This results in Zambrano's death and Angelis' career destroyed. Quinn however leads his candidate Ed Griffin to an even greater victory by framing Landon Walker as the leader of HR and restoring Angelis' career in the process ("Bury the Lede").

After the political victory, Quinn becomes Ed Griffin's chief of staff in the Mayor's Office. Quinn later asks his number two man, Patrick Simmons, to try and reforge HR's alliance with Elias by giving them mafia don Luciano Grifoni. This, however does not go as planned when it turns out Grifoni is working with Elias now and has one of his new subordinates killed declaring that Elias is done with HR ("C.O.D.").

Quinn starts talking to his godson Detective Cal Beecher for some information with Patrick Simmons guarding him. Quinn meets with Simmons to inform him of his plans to make an alliance with Russian mobster Peter Yogorov. Since Elias refuses to work with them, Quinn decides to strike a deal with the Russian Mafia in order to secure funds for the rebuilding of HR ("Shadow Box").

Quinn is eventually identified to Carter as the head of HR by a dying Raymond Terney. ("The Perfect Mark") Pretending to give up on the hunt for Cal's killer, Carter uses Finch's phone cloning program to clone Quinn's phone and spy on and record him as she prepares to bring HR down. Carter eventually tricks Quinn into confessing to having Cal murdered which Finch records through Quinn's phone. Taking Quinn into custody, Carter flees with the help of Reese, chased by HR. ("Endgame") Unable to trust the NYPD, Carter works with Reese to bring Quinn to the FBI across the city with HR, led by Simmons, hunting them. Despite HR's intervention, Carter is eventually able to get Quinn to the FBI and he is taken into custody as the head of HR, leading to the end of HR. ("The Crossing") Quinn is subsequently put into protective custody by US Marshalls, but is hunted by Reese for Simmons' location after the murder of Carter. Reese is able to force Quinn to give up Simmons' escape plan, but his injured state keeps Reese from killing Quinn before he collapses. Quinn is left alive and in custody to face punishment for his crimes while Fusco is able to use the information Quinn gave Reese to hunt down and arrest Simmons. ("The Devil's Share")

==== Patrick Simmons ====
New York City Police Department Officer Patrick M. Simmons (Robert John Burke) is a uniformed officer who is the right-hand man to Quinn; he handles HR activities on the street level ("C.O.D.").

Simmons was an old friend of Detective Fusco, and in collusion with Elias until learning from Finch that HR families were under Elias' surveillance. He also periodically meets with Fusco ("Flesh and Blood") and blackmails Fusco into working with HR ("Firewall"). Simmons has also given an anonymous tip to Detective Carter that another cop murdered Internal Affairs officer Ian Davidson, also an HR cop, as to increase the pressure on Fusco.

He is later strangled to death by Scarface, as Elias watches on. ("The Devil's Share")

==== Artie Lynch ====
New York City Police Department Captain Arthur 'Artie' Lynch (played by Michael Mulheren) was a major figure in HR with whom Fusco must appear to be working. Reese forced Lynch to deliver a message to Elias to "back away from Carter or else Reese would kill him" ("Get Carter").

A man named Andre Wilcox who was receiving protection for HR, not Elias, met with Lynch to arrange for the release of one of his men named Brick from jail. Despite being reluctant, Lynch agreed to do what Andre wanted. Lynch met with Captain Womack, the head of the precinct where Brick was being held, and told him to release Brick, which the captain did because he was a co-conspirator of Lynch ("Wolf and Cub").

Lynch is killed by Fusco when Lynch is about to kill Reese ("Matsya Nyaya").

==== Womack ====
New York City Police Department Captain P. Womack (played by John Fiore) is the captain in charge of Homicide and Carter and Fusco's supervisor. Womack protects members of HR when Carter gets too close. Reese blackmails him into transferring Fusco to Carter's precinct.

Despite first appearing in the background ("Cura Te Ipsum"), he did something of a more credited role in which he invited CIA agent Mark Snow, Tyrell Evans and Carter into his office to talk about Reese ("Number Crunch"). He appears to be a friend and known contact of Artie Lynch, when Lynch went to talk to him about doing something for him, meaning the captain is most likely corrupt. This is later confirmed when Womack is revealed to currently be incarcerated with other HR cops ("C.O.D.").

==== Raymond Terney ====
New York City Police Department Detective Raymond Terney (played by Al Sapienza) is a NYPD police detective who has been shown to work with Detective Carter on more than one occasion. He always seems to be very calm and polite.

He was investigating the murder of Vincent DeLuca, a former henchman of Don Gianni Moretti, Carl Elias' father ("The Fix").

Later, HR boss Alonzo Quinn is meeting with Detective Bill Szymanski. When he hears Szymanski say they're testifying against the Russian Yogorov mob family, Quinn kills him and the assistant district attorney to avoid it. Terney, now revealed to be part of HR, comes in, and Quinn tells him to shoot him in the right shoulder so he can survive, and make it look like someone shot all of them ("All In").

Later, Carter and Terney are investigating a place supposedly told to have been an HR hideout. Carter shoots an armed suspect, but someone takes the gun away in order to frame Carter. In the police station, Terney reveals his true colors and threatens to kill Carter if she meddles in their business ("Zero Day").

Terney and Peter Yogorov are preparing to kill Carl Elias in a dark forest. A masked Carter comes out and wounds Yogorov. Terney begs profusely for his life, and Carter knocks him out and rescues Elias ("God Mode").

Terney eventually finds out that Carter wants to take down HR when he discovers she turned Laskey. A shootout occurs, with Laskey dying instantly, and a dying Terney revealing to Carter that Alonzo Quinn is the head of HR ("The Perfect Mark").

==== Mike Laskey ====
Michael "Mike" Laskey, born Mikhail S. Lesnichy (played by Brian Wiles) is a rookie cop affiliated with HR who is installed as Carter's new partner after she is demoted to officer for getting too close to HR. She turns him by threatening to frame him for the death of another dirty cop. While initially only helping because he's forced to, Laskey comes to see the truth about HR and aids Carter and the Team in stopping a money laundering scheme. In "The Perfect Mark", Laskey follows Simmons around to try to identify the head of HR. He is killed in a shootout with Raymond Terney, but his pictures are used by Terney to identify the head of HR to Carter.

==== James Stills ====
James Stills (played by James Hanlon) is a Narcotics detective from the 51st Precinct. In (1.1 "Pilot"), he is shown to be the ringleader of a group of corrupt HR officers that includes Lionel Fusco. When he tries to frame an innocent man for murder, Reese kills him with Fusco's service pistol and has Fusco bury his body.

(2.20 "In Extremis") When Fusco is investigated by Internal Affairs in connection with Stills' disappearance, his previous relationship with Stills is explored through flashbacks. In 2004, Stills helped Fusco get back on his feet after Fusco's alcoholism destroyed his marriage. In return for his kindness, Fusco reluctantly began participating in Stills' corruption.

==== Azarello ====
Azarello (played by Louis Vanaria) is a Narcotics detective from the 51st Precinct who is part of Detective James Stills' crew. He is arrested for corruption and attempted murder at the end of (1.1 "Pilot").

(2.20 "In Extremis) Flashbacks show Azarello as a long time willing participant in corruption with his partner James Stills. In 2013, he attempts to get his prison sentence reduced by giving information to NYPD Internal Affairs about Lionel Fusco's involvement in Stills' disappearance. Joss Carter eventually enlists help from mob boss Carl Elias, who is able to use his resources to pressure Azarello into recanting.

=== Federal Bureau of Investigation ===
The following characters are involved in the pursuit for "The man in the suit" story-line.

==== Nicholas Donnelly ====
Federal Bureau of Investigation (FBI) Special Agent Nicholas Donnelly (played by Brennan Brown) was a federal agent who becomes interested in Reese when one of his cases crosses one of Reese's. Donnelly's intent was to expose the CIA for their illegal actions and crimes and track down "The Man in the Suit". He periodically offers Carter the opportunity to work with him as he pursues Reese.

A native of Roanoke, Virginia, Donnelly studied law at Northwestern University. In August 1998, he joined the FBI after graduating from the FBI Academy with honors. He began with the Miami, Florida field office in counter-terrorism until he distinguished himself as an investigator and became a highly sought-after agent. In subsequent years, he moved from Miami to Portland, Oregon in 2000, then to San Diego in 2003. He was promoted to supervisory special agent for the Boston Field Office in 2007 and worked there until 2011. He was then transferred to New York City ("Prisoner's Dilemma") . He first appears investigating Scott Powell for the murder of Congressman Michael Delancey. He first encounters The Man in the Suit when Reese breaks out Scott Powell from the FBI's custody. Although Powell was later proven innocent, Donnelly started suspecting Reese of being a mercenary ("Root Cause"). Donnelly believed that Reese was selling his services to the highest bidder and working for Elias ("Identity Crisis").

Donnelly informs Carter that the FBI has information about DNA that ties Reese to a case involving smugglers ("Blue Code") and a cold case from 2011 in New Rochelle, New York. Donnelly invites Carter to assist on the investigation, and she accepts. In New Rochelle, he discovers the fact that the victim, Peter Arndt, was in debt to loan sharks, and he hypothesizes that the loan sharks had hired Reese to kill him ("Many Happy Returns").

Donnelly offers Carter a temporary role with the FBI when he finally manages to track Reese's phone to a bank. He tells her about his new theory that Reese is working for CIA Agent Snow and is receiving aid of some sort from China to help him further. He then makes his way to the bank with several armed FBI officers and Carter, and arrests four men wearing suits, one of them being Reese. When he asks Carter if she recognizes any of them as "the man in the suit", she tells him that she does not ("Shadow Box").

After getting Carter to interrogate the suspects, Donnelly finds out Carter was conspiring against him. He arrests Reese and Carter, planning on taking them to a safe house and incarcerating them shortly after. The Machine, however, identified him as a Person of Interest and informed Finch. Finch tried to warn Donnelly but was too late. Kara Stanton intercepted them, killing Donnelly and kidnapping Reese ("Prisoner's Dilemma").

After the events of "Dead Reckoning", Donnelly's former partner reveals to Carter that they have identified the "Man in the Suit" as Mark Snow, following his death at the hands of Kara Stanton ("Dead Reckoning").

==== Brian Moss ====
Federal Bureau of Investigation (FBI) Special Agent Brian Moss (played by Brian Hutchison) is an FBI Special Agent in charge (SAIC) of investigating the death of Nicholas Donnelly. He incorrectly came to the conclusion that Mark Snow was "the man in the suit". He then tried to recruit Carter to the FBI but had to reject her due to her relationship to Calvin Beecher, who was under investigation at the time for his involvement with HR. He later appears in "Proteus" to bring Carter a series of missing persons files she requested which, unknown to him, were the victims of an identity-stealing serial killer.

==== Martin LeRoux ====
Martin LeRoux (played by David Aaron Baker) is an FBI Special Agent, Samaritan operative and contract killer. He first appears in (5.1 "BSOD") when he is part of a joint investigation with NYPD Internal Affairs into Lionel Fusco's involvement in the deaths of Dominic and Carl Elias. To protect Samaritan's role in the "Correction", he eventually presents a drastically different chain of events than were initially in Fusco's report and then proceeds to allow Fusco to return to active duty.

(5.12 ".exe") LeRoux reappears after the NYPD discovers the bodies of the missing persons at the demolition site. He grills Fusco about evidence he collected, but Fusco feigns ignorance. LeRoux kidnaps Fusco and reveals that he is actually the one who murdered all of the missing persons, working at the behest of Samaritan. He tries to shoot and kill Fusco at a secluded beach, but is overpowered when it is revealed that Fusco is wearing a bulletproof vest. Fusco debates whether to arrest him or kill him. In the series finale, Fusco claims that he allowed LeRoux to live and has him locked up in the trunk of his car.

=== The Government ===
The following characters are tied to a government conspiracy related to the development and use of the Machine.

==== Alicia Corwin ====
Alicia M. Corwin (played by Elizabeth Marvel) is a liaison between Ingram and the government while the Machine was being developed. She was the deputy Assistant to the President for National Security Affairs (APNSA) and as a former member, she is one of the few to know of the Machine's existence.

Corwin met with Nathan Ingram to determine the progress of the Machine. Ingram gave her a social security number associated with a DIA agent.

Later, she introduced Ingram to Denton Weeks who told Ingram that the DIA agent was found to be a traitor. Weeks was curious as to how the Machine actually worked, and was unhappy when he was told that the Machine could not be used to track specific people. He threatened to reduce the payment for the Machine, but Corwin explained to him that Ingram was building it merely for one US dollar ("Super").

Alicia met with Nathan in a bar to discuss the transfer of the Machine to its new location. They discussed dissemination and she assured him that nobody would be able to track the data back to the Machine or to Ingram. Yet she was visibly shaken and told Nathan that she was happy to return to her day job once everything related to the Machine was settled ("No Good Deed").

Corwin was in Morocco, where she met with CIA agents Mark Snow, John Reese and Kara Stanton. She gave Reese and Stanton orders to retrieve a stolen laptop with secret software from Ordos, China. In reality, whether she knew it or not, the whole operation was nothing more than a ruse to check and make sure that an advance team had eliminated all the software engineers related to The Machine as well as successfully moving the Machine to another location ("Matsya Nyaya").

After Ingram died, Corwin quit her job at the government and moved to Green Bank, a small town in West Virginia that does not have cell phones or wireless internet ("Wolf and Cub").

Will Ingram, eager to know what his father was working on before he died, tracked Alicia down and questioned her. During their conversation, Will referred to his "uncle Harold". Alicia seemed unnerved at the mention of his name and abruptly ended the conversation. She told Will nothing about her knowledge of the Machine ("Wolf and Cub").

Sometime after meeting with Will, Alicia was being contacted by a member of National Security Agency (NSA), Henry Peck who was being attacked by government assassins trying to silence him about The Machine. Peck called Alicia numerous times trying to get information about "the machine". Though they never met in person, Alicia spoke to Peck over the phone. Not answering any of his questions she only mentioned "Sibilance" and told him to "run". Apparently through following Peck, Alicia managed to listen in a conversation between Peck and Finch. She was visibly surprised when Finch told Peck that the machine existed and that he had built it ("No Good Deed").

Alicia succeeded in tracking down Harold and observed him leaving the Library. She broke into the building and discovered Finch's headquarters. Not realizing what exactly she was looking at, she seemed overwhelmed seeing the Irrelevant List ("Firewall").

Alicia finally found Finch in his car waiting to pick up John Reese and Caroline Turing. Climbing into his car and confronting him at gun point, she stated that Nathan was afraid and stressed about what they had built, and that he was killed by the machine. As guilt was starting to weigh down on her, she claimed she could feel it watching and listening to them at that moment. Alicia told Finch that she was tired of running.

Finch told her that she was not running from the machine, but she was running from people they had both trusted. Alicia said he was right, but that it was a good thing she found Finch first. Moments later, she was killed with a gunshot to the head by Root. She was later found dead at the meeting point by Reese ("Firewall").

Corwin's murder attracted much attention from different angles. Reese asked Carter and Fusco to look into the case and find out why Corwin was in New York ("The Contingency"). Mark Snow also began an independent investigation under the coercion of Kara Stanton. They all hit a dead end because at the same time Special Counsel and Denton Weeks conspired to corrupt the investigation when they feared that the investigation into Corwin's death might uncover their secret activities ("Bad Code"). Their fixer, Hersh, managed to clean up the majority of the evidence, except for a few objects Fusco removed from her apartment prior to his arrival. Hersh also removed a radio-frequency identification (RFID) chip from the right shoulder of Corwin's body that had been planted in her and could be the reason why she had been running and hiding ("Masquerade"). Special Counsel later receives a report stating that the chip was linked to Decima Technologies, the group that was trying to take control of the Machine. ("God Mode")

==== Denton Weeks ====
Denton L. Weeks (played by Cotter Smith) was the official who commissioned the development of the machine. He worked for the President for National Security Affairs (APNSA) and is Alicia Corwin's supervisor. He was one of the few people to know of the Machine's existence. He is in league with the Special Counsel.

At an unspecified point in time, Weeks was appointed head of a task force on Privacy and Information, reporting directly to the Chief of Staff. Prior to that promotion, he had already been working in corporate law for a decade as a member of the White House legal team and a specialist in security policy ("Bad Code").

Weeks and Corwin arrived unannounced at Nathan Ingram's office to question him about the Social Security number Ingram gave to Corwin in a previous meeting. Demanding an explanation how a computer program could spot a traitor when federal agents could not Weeks tried to gain more knowledge about how the machine worked. He appeared slightly agitated when Ingram did not answer his questions but had to put up with it when he was informed about the price negotiated for the project. He did not know that the Machine had already evaluated him as a possible threat. Finch later revealed to Ingram that Weeks had been unsuccessfully trying to hack into the Machine via NSA feeds for the past six months ("Super").

Following the murder of Alicia Corwin by Root, Weeks met with Special Counsel to discuss further steps. They just started to remove all evidence when Weeks received a message from his mistress about an emergency. Not knowing that Root had set it up to lure him to his getaway lodge, he drove there and got knocked out by Root with a sedative ("The Contingency"). Root then tortured him using Palestinian hanging, an enhanced interrogation technique that was once authorized in a top-secret Department of Defense memo by Weeks, trying to get him talking about the whereabouts of the Machine.

In a suitable moment when Root was away to gas up the car, Weeks recognized Finch and convinced him to help him escape. Weeks managed to free himself and attacked Root when she returned. He beat her up and then turned her gun on Finch threatening to shoot him unless he told him what he knew about how to access the Machine. Just as planned by Root, however, the gun did not fire and Root first tased Weeks and eventually killed him by shooting him in the chest ("Bad Code").

==== Special Counsel ====
Special Counsel (played by Jay O. Sanders) is a shadowy figure from the United States Office of Special Counsel and one of the original eight people who know about the Machine. He is in a position which is filled by Presidential appointment, followed by Congressional confirmation. He appears to be the one engineering the activity regarding the Machine, and sees Reese as a threat.

He sent out a team of hit men to assassinate Henry Peck after he came too close to finding out about the Machine ("No Good Deed").

After Alicia Corwin was murdered, he conspired with Denton Weeks and Hersh to cover-up the case and to make sure that there are no connections to them ("The Contingency"). When Weeks went missing, he sent Hersh to look for him, but Hersh only found him dead ("Bad Code").

He later sent Hersh to kill the "Man in the Suit" but redirected him to the FBI when it appears the FBI captured him. When asked about all four suspects, he tells Hersh to kill them all ("Prisoner's Dilemma").

After Hersh's failed attempt to kill The Man in the Suit at Rikers Penitentiary, he once again instructs Hersh to find Reese and kill him. This time, Hersh loses in a fist fight with Reese and after recovering in the hospital, Special Counsel calls him in for more important matters. He then begins drafting a letter with his new secretary, who is revealed to be Root ("Booked Solid").

He meets with Shaw and she trades him her partner's evidence on the Program in exchange for calling the hit off on her. He agrees and Shaw kills her treacherous handler before leaving. Later, Hersh poisons Shaw anyway ("Relevance").

In "God Mode", he arrives with Hersh and two other men to confront Finch about the Machine. Reese, Finch, Root, and Shaw leave, and someone calls Counsel. It comes from an unnamed woman who is at a higher rank than Special Counsel. Hersh takes the phone, and the woman orders him to seal the room. Hersh kills Special Counsel and leaves.

==== Senator Ross Garrison ====
Senator Ross Garrison (played by John Doman) is a U.S. Senator and one of the original eight people who was aware of the Machine's existence.

He first appears in (3.19 "Most Likely To...") where he speaks to Control about his worries of potential legal ramifications if the Machine's existence was ever made public. After Operation Northern Lights is exposed by Vigilance, he denies any knowledge during a press conference. Later, he orders Control to shut down the program.

(3.20 "Death Benefit") Garrison meets with John Greer and he is convinced to give Samaritan a 24 hour test period in the five boroughs of New York City.

(3.21 "Beta") Garrison demands and later receives a relevant number from Greer, but he remains unaware that the main goal of the Samaritan beta is to track down Harold Finch.

(3.22 "A House Divided") While in a meeting to get approval for Samaritan, Garrison is one of the hostages captured by Vigilance and taken to their kangaroo court proceedings.

(3.23 "Deus Ex Machina") Garrison gives a brief testimony in the "trial", deflecting most of the blame to Control. Through the intervention of Reese and Hersh, Garrison is eventually rescued by Decima agents and he is evacuated with Control. After a bomb in the post office goes off and Vigilance is falsely implicated, Garrison readily agrees to Greer's demands for complete control and he allows Samaritan to go online.

Garrison makes periodic appearances in Season 4 to check on the status of Samaritan. (4.12 "Control-Alt-Delete) He chastises Control for claiming that Samaritan representatives are purposely trying to derail her investigation into a terrorist cell.

(5.12 ".exe") In a simulated world where the Machine never existed, Samaritan goes online as the government's surveillance program anyway. Garrison meets with John Greer to discuss his dissatisfaction with Decima's practices. After Garrison leaves, Greer orders his trusted assassin (Root) to kill him.

(5.13 "return 0") At a secret meeting following the destruction of Samaritan, Garrison attempts to blame the ICE-9 virus attack on the Chinese. However, a government official calls his bluff and blames Operation Northern Lights. Garrison absolves himself of complicity by claiming that Operation Northern Lights was shut down years before.

==== Henry Peck ====
Henry Peck (played by Jacob Pitts) is a former NSA Analyst and Person of Interest. (1.22 "No Good Deed") When Peck discovers the existence of the mass surveillance program, "Operation Northern Lights", an ISA team is sent to kill him. Peck still refuses to stop investigating, so Finch is forced to tell him the truth and give him a new identity so he can escape the threat. Alicia Corwin secretly records their conversation and learns of Finch's involvement.

(5.12 ".exe") In a simulated world where the Machine never existed, Peck uncovers the existence of Samaritan. He presents his evidence to a member of the Office of Special Counsel, revealed to be Shaw. After she verifies that Peck hasn't told anyone else about his theory, she assassinates him.

=== Intelligence Support Activity (ISA) ===
The following characters are part of Sameen Shaw's back story relating to her time with the ISA.

==== Hersh ====
Hersh (played by Boris McGiver) was Special Counsel's enforcer and fixer in the clean-up of Alicia Corwin's murder. He also worked for Control, the head of the Intelligence Support Activity.

After Alicia Corwin was found dead and the investigation was handed over to the NYPD 8th Precinct, Hersh was sent there to make sure that "the investigation is a dead end". He stole Corwin's case file and corrupted digital records as well as the ballistics report ("The Contingency").

While still investigating the Corwin murder, Hersh is dispatched to investigate the disappearance of Denton Weeks. Suspicious of Hersh's presence and behavior, Fusco uses Finch's phone cloning program to listen in on Hersh's cell phone and follow him around. From information overheard on one of Hersh's calls, Fusco discovers a clue to where Root was holding Finch ("Bad Code").

To clean up loose ends, Hersh went to Corwin's hotel room and collected personal effects and later gained access to the cold storage room at the morgue where Corwin's body had been examined to remove an RFID chip from under her skin ("Masquerade").

Parallel to corrupting the Corwin investigation, Special Counsel also sent Hersh to track down Denton Weeks, who had disappeared on private business and was later found dead after Root shot him ("Bad Code").

When Special Counsel learned of Reese's recent arrest, Special Counsel instructed him to kill him and the other three people arrested. Following the instruction, he pulled out a gun in front of a group of policemen and shot into the air several times. He was arrested and taken to Rikers Penitentiary where he managed to kill Brian Kelly, one of the four men who were arrested on suspicion of being "The Man in the Suit". He attempted to kill Reese too, but Elias stopped him before he had a chance to do so ("Prisoner's Dilemma").

Hersh is freed from Rikers and tracks Reese to a hotel when he saves the latest person of interest. Hersh and Reese engage in a brief fight with Reese defeating Hersh.

Hersh is then seen receiving a call from the Special Counsel telling him there is a situation in Washington, D.C. The Special Counsel then calls in his newly hired assistant Ms. May, who unknown to Special Counsel, is the hacker Root ("Booked Solid").

His next appearance is in New York, poisoning Sameen Shaw. However, with the help of Leon Tao, the team is able to fake her death ("Relevance").

Hersh leads the effort to prevent Decima Technologies from taking control of the Machine. He later confronts Finch, Reese, Shaw and Root at gunpoint in the Hanford Nuclear Reservation where the Machine had once been stored. After they leave, Hersh is ordered by Control to kill everyone in the room, including Special Counsel. He is also revealed to have orchestrated the ferry bombing that killed Nathan Ingram and left Finch with his permanent injuries. ("God Mode")

Hersh is later sent by Control to kill Root in a psychiatric hospital. With the help of the Machine, Root escapes and wounds Hersh but spares his life on orders from the Machine. ("Lady Killer")

After being exposed, Control calls in Hersh in her attempts to get either the Machine or Arthur Claypool's machine Samaritan. With the help of Root, the team escapes, but Hersh captures Root who is taken for torture by Control. Hersh then leads a SWAT team to the bank where Vigilance is trying to retrieve the Samaritan drives. When Peter Collier refuses to cooperate, Hersh and his team storm the bank, killing several Vigilance members before one blows himself up with a grenade, leaving Hersh's fate unknown. ("Alethia")

Hersh survives and is later tracked down by Shaw hunting another relevant number. Shaw drugs Hersh for information about why the government is after Owen Matthews and leaves him alive. Before she departs, Hersh asks if Shaw's new employers are treating her well, showing concern for Shaw who simply tells him that they haven't tried to kill her and leaves. ("4C")

After Vigilance abducts Control and several other important people, Hersh arrives at the hotel where he enters a standoff with Reese and Shaw. After Root tells them Hersh knows where to find Finch, Reese and Shaw convince him to work with them to save their respective bosses. Hersh then leads them to Decima's hideout only to find it empty and that Peter Collier is running a kangaroo court where everyone is on trial for their connection to the Machine. ("A House Divided")

After a brief gunfight with Decima operatives, Hersh, Reese and Shaw set out together to find the courthouse. When Shaw needs to get to Root fast, Hersh helps her steal a bike and continues on to a destination specified by Root. There, they meet up with Detective Fusco who brings them Bear and news of a Vigilance operative looting nearby stores. Hersh and Reese are able to trick the operative into giving them the courthouse location before turning him over to Fusco. Near the courthouse, they find a Vigilance guard post slaughtered and Finch testifying on TV about the history of the Machine. Finally reaching the courthouse, Hersh and Reese separate, acknowledging they will likely be enemies the next time they meet. In the basement, Hersh finds a bomb set to go off when the power is restored and sets to work disarming it, refusing help from Reese and telling him to focus on rescuing Finch. Hersh is severely wounded in a gunfight with Decima operatives, but continues his efforts to disarm the bomb. Before he can cut a last wire, the power comes back on and the bomb detonates, killing Hersh, the people kidnapped for the trial and the emergency responders.

The next day, Control receives Hersh's final autopsy report. During her voiceover, Root states that a lot of people who could've helped them against Samaritan will die as the report is shown, indicating Hersh to be one of those people. ("Deux Ex Machina")

==== Control ====
Control (played by Camryn Manheim) is the alias of the head of the ISA's operation (code-named Northern Lights) regarding the Machine. She is a forty-year-old single mother with a ten-year-old daughter, Julia. Control is shrewd but ruthless and combat-minded.

Control is first mentioned in (2.22 "God Mode") when Special Counsel calls her from the Hanford Nuclear facility where the Machine was formally stored. She speaks to Hersh and orders him to "seal" the room. He confirms her orders and executes everyone who is present including Special Counsel. Later, Hersch is seen talking to a unseen woman in a black town car assumed to be Control.

She first appears in (3.11 "Lethe") posing as the wife of Arthur Claypool, Samaritan's creator, who is suffering from memory loss due to a terminal brain tumor. After escaping Vigilance, Claypool remembers the death and burial of his wife, which exposes Control as an impostor.

(3.12 "Aletheia") Control brings her ISA team into the room to attempt to coerce access to the Machine or Samaritan out of either Finch or Claypool. She orders Hersh to execute Shaw, but Root crashes the party and is captured by Hersh instead while the others escape. Control recognizes Root as the analog interface for the Machine and brutally tortures her for its location, going so far as to deafen Root in her right ear. The Machine helps Root get the upper hand and escape.

(3.16 "Ram") In 2010, Control is angry to learn that CIA agents Reese and Stanton failed to retrieve Daniel Casey's laptop and that it has been traced to Ordos, China. She orders Special Counsel to have the CIA send Reese and Stanton to confirm its location and then be killed in a drone strike as a punishment.

(3.22 "A House Divided") Control is present at a meeting with other high level government officials to discuss the possible implementation of Samaritan. She becomes one of the hostages taken by Vigilance.

(3.23 "Deus Ex Machina") After Sen. Garrison makes her out to be the main conspirator, Control is forced to give testimony in Vigilance's mock trial. She refuses to cooperate, saying that as a government agent she won't confirm or deny anything that is asked of her. Collier prepares to shoot her, but she is saved by Finch who is willing to talk. Eventually, Reese and Hersh assault the mock trial and the hostages are rescued by Decima agents. Control and Garrison are evacuated. She is present when Garrison allows Samaritan to go online.

(4.12 "Control-Alt-Delete") Control is shown to now be the head of Samaritan's Research into relevant threats. She tracks a terrorist cell in Detroit, but when one suspect, Yasin Said, escapes, she is denied access to all the evidence by a liaison Samaritan operative. She attempts to go above his head by getting Sen. Garrison and Greer involved, but is told to back off. She secretly contacts Devon Grice to find and interrogate Said. He gives her information that the Said will be attempting to flee to Canada on a freight train. Control and her bodyguards find Said, but he escapes when Control is captured by Reese and Root. They interrogate her in a warehouse about Shaw's location and the battle at the Stock Exchange, but it quickly becomes apparent that she has no knowledge of the events and is merely a puppet for Samaritan. She is rescued by Grice and the ISA. She travels alone to Canada and finds Said. He proclaims his innocence and it seems likely that he was set up by Samaritan, but she executes him anyway. Later, she travels to the supposed scene of the battle at the Stock Exchange. Everything seems normal, but Control notices wet paint on a wall.

(4.21 "Asylum") In Washington, D.C., Control captures and interrogates a female Samaritan handler. In the handler's schedule book, Control finds mention of an event referred to as the "Correction." The handler refuses to give up any information, so Control executes her.

(4.22 "YHWH") Control, with the help of Grice, seems to uncover that the "Correction" is a terrorist plot against the Supreme Court. Since the attack was not presented as relevant through Research, Control suspects that it is Samaritan-sanctioned operation approved by John Greer. She sends Grice to the courthouse to investigate. Control confronts Greer at gunpoint, certain that she uncovered his plot. However, the "Correction" is revealed to be a purge of persons seen as threats to Samaritan. Grice is executed for his previous betrayal and Control is black-bagged by Greer's operatives and taken away to an unknown fate.

Control considers herself the ultimate patriot. In ("Control-Alt-Delete"), she proudly exclaims that up until that point she has personally sanctioned the executions of 854 individuals whom she evaluated as detrimental to national security.

==== Devon Grice ====
Devon Grice (played by Nick Tarabay) is a Crimson 6 agent who was trained by Sameen Shaw herself when she was still working as an ISA operative. When they meet in New York whilst both on different ends of the same mission, Grice lets her live. When a Samaritan representative refuses to allow Control to review the contents of a relevant threat's laptop, she secretly enlists Grice's help to continue the investigation. When Control discovers the impending "Correction" and labels it as a Samaritan-sanctioned terrorist attack, she has Grice investigate the supposed target: the Supreme Court. When the "Correction" is revealed to be a purging of persons seen as threats to Samaritan, Grice is executed by an operative for his previous betrayal.

==== Brooks ====
Brooks (played by Theodora Miranne) is another Crimson 6 agent and Grice's partner.

==== Cole ====
Cole (played by Ebon Moss-Bachrach) is Shaw's partner at the ISA. (2.16 "Relevance") Cole uncovers evidence that he and Shaw have been assassinating innocent people. He and Shaw are set up by their handler and Cole is killed for learning to much about "The Program". Later, Shaw is shown to be watching over Cole's parents.

(5.12 ".exe") In a simulated world where the Machine never existed, Cole is shown to have survived and to still be partnered with Shaw.

=== The CIA ===
The following characters are part of Reese's back story relating to his time with the CIA.

==== Mark Snow ====
Mark Snow (played by Michael Kelly) is the alias of a CIA operative, partnered with Tyrell Evans and once worked with John Reese, and is now trying to find and kill him. He once claimed to be Reese's best friend ("Number Crunch").

In 2008, Snow was with CIA agents John Reese and Kara Stanton, operating in New York City. They had a government employee in their custody who had committed treason by attempting to sell some software to the Chinese. Positive they were not going to get a call regarding their prisoner, he allowed Reese to head out to the city for some rest ("Blue Code").

In 2010, Snow was in Morocco while Reese and Stanton were interrogating a suspect. Alongside Alicia Corwin, they gave orders to Reese and Stanton to go to Ordos to retrieve a laptop containing information pertaining to a computer virus that could disable nuclear programs. Snow had been ordered to tell both agents secretly that the other was compromised and retire each other. The plan, however, failed when Reese realized they'd been set up after Stanton shoots him, and tells him it was because he was compromised. Reese then tells her that he was ordered to do the same thing to her. They realize they were set up and escape just minutes before a gunship shelled their supposed extraction point ("Matsya Nyaya").

When Reese's fingerprints were run through the system after he is arrested, the CIA was alerted to the fact that Reese had survived the shelling in Ordos. Snow visited the precinct where Detective Carter worked and asked her a few questions about Reese. Both Snow and his partner began to follow her, but she eventually caught them. Snow had a talk with Carter at a diner afterwards in which he showed Carter that Reese was a cold blooded killer. He convinced her to set a trap to capture Reese, though his true intention was, in fact, to have him killed. However, the trap failed as his partner Evans went for non-lethal shots, allowing Reese to escape with the help of Carter to Finch's car ("Number Crunch").

In 2012, Snow, along with his CIA partner, initiated surveillance on Carter, believing she helped Reese escape. He constantly had operatives tailing her, though they were unable to track her effectively, and she managed to lose them. Later, he received information that Reese had escaped to northern Connecticut where his fingerprints were found on a prescription bottle at a veterinary clinic (planted by Lionel Fusco at Finch's request), and immediately left New York ("Super").

Snow eventually returned to New York and confronted Carter, who he was still suspicious of after realizing Reese was never in Connecticut. Later, Snow had to bail out a CIA operative known as L.O.S. who was selling drugs for the CIA in a scheme to fund the war on terror. Bluntly telling L.O.S. that he warned him about getting caught "behind enemy lines", he had his head bagged and presumably killed in the back seat of an SUV ("Blue Code").

When the FBI established a task force to catch Reese, Special Agent Donnelly informed Carter that he did not just want to apprehend Reese, but also expose Snow and the CIA's illegal operations. He claimed that Snow was the man who swept the CIA's domestic operations under the rug ("Identity Crisis").

Unhappy with the FBI's investigation into Reese, Snow paid another visit to Carter with Evans and warned her not to cooperate with Agent Donnelly. The next day, he received some information supposedly regarding Reese from a North Korean contact who had aided a CIA agent who escaped from China. Both he and Evans entered a hotel room, but were ambushed by Stanton, who had also survived the Ordos shelling. Evans was killed, while Snow was wounded as Stanton approached him, wanting to "catch-up" ("Matsya Nyaya").

Following the ambush, Snow has been held captive by Stanton, who locked him up in a storage room and forced him to wear a bomb vest to prevent him from escaping. From time to time, he would be released to "run errands" for Stanton, presumably to help her find out who had set her up in the Ordos mission. While at the morgue looking into the Alicia Corwin case, Snow accidentally ran into Carter. He told her that he had been reassigned and was no longer trying to catch Reese. When Carter tried to call Snow's CIA phone, she was redirected to another man who appeared to be looking for Snow, too ("Masquerade").

Snow killed a janitor named Dusan Babic on Stanton's orders, so that he could use his ID to get into Fujima Techtronics. As he had no other way of communicating with her, Snow left Carter's card in the dead man's pocket with Fujima Techtronics address on it. Carter followed Snow's clues to Fujima Techtronics and saw him leaving the building. Carter followed and confronted him. Snow revealed that he is rigged with an explosive vest and tells Carter to tell John that, "she is planning something big" ("Critical").

Snow is present when Reese wakes up in the back of a moving bus after being kidnapped and drugged at the end of "Prisoner's Dilemma" by Stanton. He informs Reese that they are wearing similar bomb vests and that Stanton holds the trigger to both. Kara then sends them to perform a few tasks for her.

After retrieving the drive that Mark earlier stole from Fujima Techtronics Stanton sends them to steal the car of two Bureau of Alcohol, Tobacco, Firearms and Explosives (ATF) agents. Snow nearly kills one of the agents but is stopped by Reese. Snow and Reese then take the place of the two agents and enter an office building housing a secret DOD facility on the 21st floor. While going up the elevator Stanton informs them that they would be facing two Delta Force operatives with M4s. The doors open and Reese and Snow take out the two men and tie them up. One of them hits Snow and he prepares to kill the man, but Reese stops him again. Kara warns that there may be signal interference so she arms the bombs on a 15-minute timer.

Reese and Snow then enter an electronics lab and with the help of Kevin, a technician, prepare to download a computer virus. Reese tells Snow that Stanton cannot hear them in the lab and suggests that they do something. However Snow says that they do not have enough time. Reese upon Kevin's advice starts removing the drives to trigger a security breach, Snow discovers what Reese is doing and attacks him. The two engage in a vicious fist fight but Reese holds Snow off. Just then Stanton arrives and tells them that she only needed them to clear the way and uploads a virus on the DOD servers. She then triggers a five-minute timer on the bomb vests, locks them in the lab and leaves.

With the help of Kevin, Reese and Snow manage to open the lab door and escape. Reese says that they have to get up to the roof so no one else is killed but Snow clubs him down. He says that the CIA has a safe house two blocks away. Reese warns him that the CIA will consider him compromised and all that is waiting for him is a black hood. Reese tries to get through to him but Snow simply wishes him luck and leaves. As Finch arrives and disarms Reese's bomb vest just in the nick of time, Kara returns to her car; however, to her surprise, she finds Snow in the back seat. Snow tells Stanton that she was right about him that he would be very good at dying. It is unclear what happens to Kara after that but the car explodes killing Snow and seemingly Kara. Up on the roof Reese realizes what Snow has done.

After Snow's death, the FBI informs Carter that they believe Snow to be "The Man in the Suit" that Donnelly was chasing and consider the case now closed ("Dead Reckoning").

The Machine puts a white square on Snow indicating that he does not know about its existence ("Super").

Snow does not know about the Machine. Strangely, Snow is not listed by the machine as a threat to an asset (Reese), even though he tries many times to kill him.

==== Tyrell Evans ====
Tyrell Evans (played by Darien Sills-Evans) is the alias of a CIA Operative, partnered with Mark Snow and assisted him in trying to retire Reese along with other assignments. He was shown to be an expert sniper and good with computers. He appeared many times with his partner, Snow ("Number Crunch").

He shoots Reese in the torso while his partner Mark Snow distracts Reese, almost killing him, but fails to find him afterwards as the lights are shot out by John right after ("Super").

When he and Snow receive a tip about a possible location on Reese at a hotel in the city. The two enter the room guns drawn. However, they are for some reason unable to correctly cover the room, and are shot by an assailant standing behind the door before they can return fire. The assailant turns out not to be Reese but Stanton ("Matsya Nyaya").

==== Kara Stanton ====
Kara Stanton (played by Annie Parisse) is a former CIA operative and John Reese's former handler and partner. Before joining the CIA, Kara graduated from the U.S. Naval Academy and is a former officer in the U.S. Marine Corps. Unlike John, Kara loved operating as an assassin and also was the love interest of John Reese. She was ruthless and her boss Mark Snow stated that Kara was a disturbing person " in a class all by herself ".

In 2006, Stanton met with Reese for the first time in Hungary to interrogate two men about the whereabouts of Alim Nazir. Prior to this meeting, Stanton was apparently informed by a reliable, anonymous source that the men were involved in getting Nazir out of the country. On this information, Stanton executed them in front of a shocked Reese, who expected them to be questioned before any action was taken. She also had a photo of Jessica Arndt talking to Reese at the airport. Upon showing this to Reese, she told him that he could not go back to her, and that he no longer had any old friends. Telling him to dispose of the body and gun, Stanton assigned him the cover name "Reese" ("Foe").

In 2007, in Prague, Reese and Stanton posed as a couple and shot three men down (one man selling plans on a drone to two Chinese nationals). Reese wanted to finish the mission as fast as possible but Stanton told him that he should learn to love his work as a killer ("Prisoner's Dilemma").

In 2008, Stanton, Reese, and Mark Snow were operating illegally in New York City, holding a government employee captive after he tried to sell some software to the Chinese. When Reese was given permission for time off, Stanton followed him to a bar and found him meeting with Jessica's husband Peter. She gave him a lecture, telling him that they're no longer like other people, and Reese reluctantly left with her before Jessica spotted them ("Blue Code").

In 2009, Stanton and Reese were assigned to kill a couple in Paris. They followed the couple to a bar. Stanton did not care why they have been ordered to kill them and advises Reese to act more credible since they were posing as a married couple. When the bar's other patron left, Stanton shot out the camera while Reese approached the couple.

Back in their apartment, after having killed the couple, they tried to remove all the traces that would ever prove they have been there. Stanton told him that they could take a break, but Reese said that he was fine. So Stanton drew out a gun on him and wanted him to choose between being a boy scout or a killer because she was tired of working with both. She also reminded him that he chose this life. Reese slammed her into the wall and told her that he loved his work and they kissed ("Prisoner's Dilemma").

In 2010, Reese and Stanton were in Morocco interrogating a suspect. A few hours later Mark Snow and Alicia Corwin arrived and informed them that they were being sent to China to retrieve a high-profile Stuxnet-like computer program from the Chinese. As Stanton left the room, Snow secretly ordered Reese to retire her, claiming she had been in contact with a terrorist.

The pair arrived in Ordos and discovered the site where the program was found. On arrival, they discovered the corpses of many software engineers, and much of the building's servers had been emptied. Reese found a survivor whom Stanton conversed with in Chinese. He said that men had turned up and took away the Machine. Upon hearing that, she promptly executed him and withheld what he had said from Reese. With much of what they came for already taken, Reese and Stanton had no choice but to wait for their extraction at nightfall.

When nightfall came, Stanton marked the landing zone with infrared glow sticks. Reese had readied his gun to shoot her in the back, but lowered it at the last moment, only for Stanton to turn and shoot him. She apologized, saying she had orders from Snow, and was told Reese had ties to terrorists. Reese laughed, telling her he had the same orders and that they were being set up, with the beacon actually signaling for a shelling, not extraction. Reese then made his escape, leaving Stanton standing in shock. Overhead, a CIA drone launched an incoming missile attack targeting the target structure. The wounded Reese managed to escape the blast radius, and turned back to see the explosion apparently killing his partner.

Stanton however, had managed to escape the explosion and escape China with the help of a dissident group ("Matsya Nyaya").

While recovering and becoming angry and disillusioned after operating as a CIA field operative, she was approached, successfully brainwashed and manipulated by a mysterious intelligence operator operating in the alias of "John Greer" who was aware of and tracking her while she was participating in those CIA field operations. ("Dead Reckoning").

Snow revealed to Detective Carter that over the course of their partnership, Reese and Stanton worked on numerous missions and often saved each other's lives. However, he lies and tells Carter Stanton was killed by Reese before he went off the grid ("Number Crunch").

Snow and his partner Evans were led to a hotel room after receiving some intelligence from one of their North Korean contacts. Upon their entry and subsequent search of the room, Stanton emerged from the shadows and ambushed them both, killing Evans and injuring Snow ("Matsya Nyaya").

Meaning to "catch up" with Snow, she kept him locked in a storage room with a bomb vest strapped onto him so that he would not escape. After he presented her proof that Alicia Corwin, the person who set her up in the mission to Ordos, was dead, she told him that she needed him to run a few more errands for her ("Masquerade").

Snow was seen by Carter, leaving Fujima Techtronics. Carter followed and confronted him. Snow revealed that he is rigged with an explosive vest and tells Carter to tell John that, "she is planning something big". Snow flees when a shooter fires upon them (presumably Stanton) interrupting their meeting ("Critical").

Nicholas Donnelly's number came up and Finch called him to warn him. At this point Stanton rams the vehicle that Donnelly is using to transport Reese and Carter to a safe-house. As the trio are recovering from the collision's impact, Stanton shoots Donnelly twice, before approaching Reese and asking if he missed her. She then plunges a syringe into his neck, presumably laden with some form of sedative as Reese goes limp after being injected ("Prisoner's Dilemma").

After rigging him with an explosive vest as well, she sends Reese and Snow out to run more errands for her. While fetching a hard drive, Stanton remotely instructs them to kill the sellers when they demand a higher price, but Reese refuses. Before the seller can press the matter further, Stanton who had been observing them, shoots the sellers with a sniper rifle from a rooftop.

She then orders Reese and Snow to steal the gear of two ATF agents who were about to be called in a bomb threat Stanton orchestrated in a nearby office building. The building houses a computer security installation and cyberwarfare development lab and by activating a fifteen-minute detonation timer, Stanton drives the team to clear the entry for her to access a Sensitive Compartmented Information Facility containing the weapons cache where she uploads the contents of the drive Reese and Snow retrieved earlier. Before she leaves, she triggers the bomb vests and locks the team in the room.

On the way back to her car, she calls Greer to inform him that the mission has been completed. He tells her the name of the man who sold the laptop (alleged to be Harold Finch), which was the cause for what happened in Ordos. Before she can act on the information, she is cornered by Snow, who escaped the building and hides in the backseat of her car, and then gets his revenge by seemingly killing her in his bomb's explosion. Her fate after this is unknown because she was never seen as actually in the car when it exploded and her corpse was never recovered. ("Dead Reckoning").

=== Decima Technologies ===
The following characters are involved in the Decima Technologies storyline, a shadowy organization that is in possession of the Samaritan AI:

==== John Greer ====
John Greer (played by John Nolan). Greer is a former British Army officer and MI6 agent who is trying to destroy the Machine with a rival A.I. In 2010, he sent one of three interested parties to Ordos, China to retrieve a laptop with stolen "Machine" code. The other teams were "The CIA" (John Reese and Kara Stanton) and the Chinese ("Ram" (2014), "Aletheia" (2014), "Zero Day" (2013), "Trojan Horse" (2013), and "Dead Reckoning" (2013)). He is very much present from the second half of season 3 to the end of season 5 as the main villain, getting Samaritan, a totalitarian artificial intelligence, online, to track down and kill any opponent, especially Finch, Reese, their friends, and the Machine. In the penultimate episode ".exe", Greer confronts Finch as he tries to destroy Samaritan with the Ice 9 computer virus. Greer sacrifices himself in an attempt to kill Finch by locking them in a sealed room and having Samaritan remove the oxygen. Greer dies from lack of oxygen, but Finch is rescued by the Machine with the help of Reese and Shaw who had been given Greer's number by the Machine.

==== Jeremy Lambert ====
Jeremy Lambert (played by Julian Ovenden) is an operative for Decima Technologies, and Greer's right-hand man. He first appears (in 3.16 "RAM") posing as a government agent that wants to help Daniel Casey. Casey sees through his deception, forcing Lambert to attempt harsher methods to get at Casey's laptop. He is ultimately unsuccessful when the laptop falls into the hands of a Chinese intelligence agent.

(3.23 "Deus Ex Machina") Lambert and Decima rescue the hostages from Vigilance's mock trial. After Greer reveals the truth behind Vigilance, Lambert shoots and kills Peter Collier.

(4.10 "The Cold War") Lambert meets Root in a shadow zone and brokers a meeting between her and the analog interface of Samaritan, Gabriel Hayward.

(5.4 "6,741") Lambert is killed by Shaw in her escape from Samaritan, however it is later revealed that this was just one of thousands of simulations in Shaw's mind to get her to lead Samaritan to the Machine.

(5.7 "QSO") Lambert takes Shaw on a field trip to see a scientist whose research is threatening Samaritan's long term goals. Shaw kills the scientist, thinking she is in another simulation. However, it later becomes evident that maybe Shaw has lost her grip on reality and in fact really did kill an innocent person.

(5.8 "Reassortment") Shaw is finally able to escape her captors and finds herself within a South African prison. Right before getting to freedom, she is stopped by Lambert who tries to convince her that she is still in a simulation. Shaw mortally wounds him with a gunshot to the chest, telling him that he will be fine if this is only a simulation. As Lambert dies of his wound, Shaw takes his keys and drives his vehicle away from the facility.

==== Martine Rousseau ====
Martine Rousseau (played by Cara Buono) is the alias of a former investigator for the United Nations who is now a Samaritan operative.

Martine first appears in (4.1 "Panopticon") where she murders a journalist in Budapest who is attempting to reveal Samaritan to the public. Afterwards she serves as John Greer's lead assassin, hellbent on destroying the POI team.

(4.8 "Point of Origin") Martine is tasked by Greer to discover the identity of a woman (Sameen Shaw), who ISA operative Devon Grice allowed to escape a crime scene. She is eventually able to find Shaw's criminal friend Romeo, who she tortures for information. Romeo gives up Shaw and Martine tracks her to the department store that she works at for her cover identity.

(4.9 "The Devil You Know") When Shaw's cover is blown, Martine goes after her in a gunfight in a department store. Shaw is able to escape with the help of Root.

(4.11 "If-Then-Else") Martine leads a Samaritan task force to take out the POI team in the sub-levels of the Stock Exchange. Ultimately, Shaw intervenes and sacrifices herself to help the others escape and is last seen being shot multiple times at close range by Martine.

(4.19 "Search and Destroy") Martine intercepts the POI team when they discover a secret facility that Samaritan is using to apply Sulaiman Khan's anti-virus software to a worldwide search for the Machine. Root and Martine engage each other in hand-to-hand combat, but the POI team is overwhelmed and forced to retreat. Martine captures Khan and brings him to Greer.

(4.21 "Asylum") Root and Finch are captured while infiltrating a mental asylum that serves as Samaritan's New York base of operations. Martine confines Root to a bed, intent on brutally torturing her. While the Machine and Samaritan discuss the surrender of the Machine in exchange for the release of the POI agents, Root is able to get an advantage over Martine and snap her neck.

==== Gabriel Hayward ====
Gabriel Hayward (played by Oakes Fegley) is a young boy who acts as Samaritan's "analog interface".

==== Claire Mahoney ====
Claire Mahoney (played by Quinn Shephard) is a former college student who stole files from a private military contractor and who now has become obsessed with solving the Nautilus puzzle. Finch is able to discover that the Nautilus is actually a Samaritan recruiting tool, but he can't convince Claire to stop her quest. She makes it to the end of the puzzle where she is surrounded by hitmen hired by the PMC, but she is saved by an unseen marksman. She finds a hidden cell phone and Samaritan tells her that it will now protect her.

(4.15 "Q&A") Claire secretly contacts Finch, telling him that he was right about Samaritan. Finch rescues her from a sniper who wounds her and she attempts to give him a piece of Samaritan source code to study on his computer, but he remains suspicious. Eventually, she calls Harold by his name (which he never told her) and she is outed as an active Samaritan operative. She takes Harold at gunpoint to a Samaritan-controlled school and attempts to recruit him. He refuses and is taken away by other Samaritan operatives, but Root saves him and wounds Claire. Later, Claire takes Finch's laptop to Greer. When stating that she was nearly killed twice, she becomes concerned when Greer implies that she is expendable.

==== Zachary ====
Zachary (played by Robert Manning, Jr) an operative for Decima Technologies who later becomes a Samaritan agent. He is killed by John Reese in ".exe".

==== Jeff Blackwell ====
Jeff Blackwell (played by Joshua Close) is a recently paroled ex-con who later works for Samaritan.

(5.2 "SNAFU") Blackwell is originally a Person of Interest who is written off by Reese as a non-threat due to the Machine suffering malfunctions from its reboot. Later, he is recruited into Samaritan by Mona.

(5.5 "ShotSeeker") Blackwell is put back onto the POI team's radar when he is involved in the theft of research compiled by a missing graduate student at the behest of Samaritan.

(5.8 "Reassortment") Blackwell is tasked by Mona to infect two doctors in a quarantined hospital with a Samaritan-created virus, but the POI team stops him from completing his mission.

(5.10 "The Day The World Went Away") Blackwell is given the order by a superior to take out two high-valued targets (Finch and Root) from a sniper perch. He misses Finch, but mortally wounds Root, which eventually leads to her death.

(5.13 "return 0") Blackwell is part of a Samaritan team that assaults the Subway. He is captured by Fusco and Shaw, who with the help of the Machine deduce that he killed Root. He is able to stab Fusco with a hidden knife and escape. One week after the destruction of Samaritan, Shaw tracks him down and executes him as retribution for Root.

==== Mona ====
Mona (played by LaChanze) is a Samaritan operative who recruits Jeff Blackwell and later serves as his handler. She orders Blackwell to infiltrate a quarantined hospital and murder two doctors with a virulent flu strain created by Samaritan. Blackwell can't complete his mission, but Mona tells him that his actions ultimately helped achieve the desired outcome: Following the outbreak, numerous civilians willingly went to clinics for vaccinations allowing Samaritan to secretly collect their DNA.

==== Travers ====
Travers (played by Michael Potts) is a Samaritan agent who serves as a liaison with the government. (4.12 "Control-Alt-Delete") Travers is present in Research when Control demands to be privy to vital information on a suspected terrorist's laptop. He refuses and eventually turns off the Samaritan feeds when Control persists. He turns the feeds back on after Sen. Garrison gets Control to back down. (5.12 ".exe") Travers captures Finch in a Fort Meade server room, as Finch attempts to upload the ICE-9 computer virus. He then brings Finch to Greer.

=== Vigilance ===
The following characters are involved in the Vigilance story line, in which a violent organization professes to protect people's privacy from government intrusion.

==== Peter Collier ====
Peter Collier (played by Leslie Odom, Jr.) is the alias of Peter Brandt, the presumed leader of Vigilance. In 2010, Peter Brandt was an aspiring lawyer whose former addict brother Jesse was arrested by the federal government and held without legal counsel. Jesse eventually committed suicide while in custody, but Peter learned afterwards that Jesse was innocent. Infuriated, Peter got no answers or explanations from the government. Soon after, he was contacted by an anonymous source who played to his anger and ultimately recruited him into Vigilance where he took the alias of Peter Collier. Vigilance started off small by vandalizing surveillance equipment and spreading propaganda. After discovering an undercover federal agent in his ranks and summarily executing him, Collier was goaded by the anonymous source into taking more drastic measures.

Collier first appears posing as a member of a firm named Riverton, who is trying to get involved with Person of Interest Wayne Kruger's Lifetrace company. Kruger's own life unravels after his privacy and legal history are compromised by members involved in a class-action lawsuit against his company. Kruger unwittingly attempts to meet with Riverton to save the deal, unaware that Collier orchestrated his demise. Collier wounds Reese and executes Kruger before disappearing.

Collier and Vigilance attempt to abduct Arthur Claypool, the creator of rival ASI "Samaritan", but are foiled by Finch and Shaw. Vigilance eventually tracks Finch, Claypool and Shaw to a bank where the two drives containing the Samaritan source code are being held. Collier attempts to bomb his way into the vault to capture Claypool and Finch and destroy the drives, but is unsuccessful when Reese and Fusco show up to help.

After Vigilance kills OPR official Leona Wainwright, Finch and Fusco travel to her Washington, D.C. office to figure out why she was targeted. Finch breaks into her vault and discovers a government black ops budget report that mentions Operation Northern Lights. Collier and Vigilance show up to get the report and capture Finch, but he is rescued by Root and Fusco. Collier escapes with the report and disseminates it to the press, which causes Sen. Garrison to order Control to shut down Operation Northern Lights.

Collier and Vigilance use a computer virus to disable the power grid in New York City, so that they can capture Sen. Garrison, Control, National Security Adviser Manuel Rivera, John Greer and Finch. They take their hostages to an abandoned post office where they have set up a kangaroo court to try the hostages for their crimes against privacy. When Rivera get hostile during his testimony, he is shot and killed by Collier. After Garrison implicates Control as the main conspirator, Collier prepares to shoot her but Finch is able to stop him and admits his involvement in creating the Machine. Reese and Hersh team up to save their bosses and assault the post office, forcing Vigilance to take the hostages to a nearby rooftop for immediate execution. Decima agents led by Jeremy Lambert attack and kill everyone except Garrison, Control, Greer, Finch and Collier. After Garrison and Control are evacuated to safety, Greer tells Collier the brutal truth: Decima created Vigilance and subliminally radicalized them. When the power in the city is restored, a massive bomb in the post office explodes which kills Hersh, many Vigilance members and numerous civilians. The bombing is blamed on Vigilance, painting them as a domestic terrorist organization. Garrison falls for the ploy and uses the attack to quickly adopt Samaritan as the government's new mass surveillance program. Jeremy Lambert then executes Collier, but Finch escapes with the help of Reese.

==== Madison ====
Madison (played by Diane Davis) is the alias of a member of Vigilance, possibly second in command to Collier. She acts as the judge during Vigilance's "trial". Though initially able to escape the post office bombing, she is labelled as a threat when Samaritan goes online and is found and killed by operatives.

== General and cited references ==
- As of this edit, this article uses content from "Pedia of Interest (Wikia)", which is licensed in a way that permits reuse under the Creative Commons Attribution-ShareAlike 3.0 Unported License, but not under the GFDL. All relevant terms must be followed.
