= Return 0 =

"return 0"
- Person of Interest episode
- Episode no.: Season 5 Episode 13
- Directed by: Chris Fisher
- Written by: Jonathan Nolan & Denise Thé
- Cinematography by: David Insley
- Editing by: Mark Conte
- Production code: 3J6012
- Original air date: June 21, 2016
- Running time: 44 minutes

Guest appearances
- John Doman as Senator Ross Garrison; Carrie Preston as Grace Hendricks; Josh Close as Jeff Blackwell; John Douglas Thompson as Murphy; Neal Matarazzo as Lieutenant Kierny; Justin Grace as Cop

Episode chronology
← Previous ".exe"	Next → —

"return 0" is the series finale of the American television drama series Person of Interest. It is the 13th episode of the fifth season and is the 103rd overall episode of the series. The episode was written by series creator Jonathan Nolan and executive producer Denise Thé, and directed by executive producer Chris Fisher. It aired on CBS in the United States and on CTV in Canada on June 21, 2016.

The series centers on a mysterious reclusive billionaire computer programmer, Harold Finch (Michael Emerson), who has developed a computer program for the federal government known as "the Machine" that is capable of collating all sources of information to predict terrorist acts and to identify people planning them. The Machine also identifies perpetrators and victims of other premeditated deadly crimes; however, because the government considers these "irrelevant", Finch programs the Machine to delete this information each night. To help him with his missions in saving lives, Finch recruited John Reese (Jim Caviezel), a former CIA agent who is presumed dead; NYPD Detectives Joss Carter (Taraji P. Henson) and Lionel Fusco (Kevin Chapman); Samantha "Root" Groves (Amy Acker), a highly intelligent computer hacker and contract killer, and Sameen Shaw (Sarah Shahi), a former ISA assassin. Throughout the course of the show, the team dealt with many adversaries and enemies, resulting in the death of Carter and Root. The finale focuses on the team's last stand against Samaritan, a competing intelligent system that wants to expand and destroy the Machine. The title refers to "Return 0", which means that a program will successfully execute its intention or plan.

According to Nielsen Media Research, the episode was seen by an estimated 6.51 million household viewers and gained a 1.0/4 ratings share among adults aged 18–49. The episode received universal acclaim from critics and fans, who praised the writing, acting, musical score, directing, pace, emotional impact and "great closure" for the series, and has been called one of the best series finales of all time.

== Plot ==
The episode starts with news reports about the aftermath of the ICE-9 virus spreading throughout the country before the screen turns black and the Machine (Amy Acker) speaks Root's opening lines from "B.S.O.D.", revealing it was the Machine talking. The scene then cuts to Finch (Michael Emerson) going to a building's rooftop with the Machine on a briefcase as it loses energy and starts saying that everyone dies alone. Finch is shown to have been shot in the stomach.

One day before, Shaw (Sarah Shahi) visits Root's grave and discovers that the Machine took Root's voice. Samaritan has taken Root's cochlear implant from which it has learned all of their cover identities. Samaritan agents arrive, forcing Shaw to flee. Reese (Jim Caviezel) and Fusco (Kevin Chapman) arrive at the precinct but Samaritan has officers on its payroll. Its agents arrest them and take them to the docks to kill them. However, they are saved by snipers sent by the Machine and meet Finch at the docks. He takes them to the subway station where Shaw reveals that the Machine protected itself on a backup copy, but Samaritan has done the same, storing a copy of itself immune to the virus located in a Federal Reserve bank. Shaw and Fusco stay in the station to protect the Machine while Reese and Finch go to the vault.

In order to gain access to the vault, Reese and Finch threaten the guard that their briefcase carries a thermonuclear weapon and the building is evacuated. During their mission, Finch is shot in the stomach while Reese fights against the Samaritan agents. The virus is successfully uploaded in the servers, but Samaritan is trying to transfer its compressed code to another unit: a Midtown building with a Torus antenna where it intends to upload itself to a Russian satellite and come back stronger. The Machine warns Finch that they need to reach the antenna but whoever goes there will die, as Samaritan will send a missile to the location and prevent its destruction. Unwilling to let Reese do it, Finch locks him in the vault and goes to reach the antenna.

At the station, the Machine instructs Shaw to activate the train's mobile system so they can leave the station just as Samaritan agents arrive. However, Jeff Blackwell (Josh Close) breaks into the train and shoots Shaw in the arm before being subdued by Fusco. While inspecting his weaponry, Shaw recognizes his gun as the same one that killed Root and realizes that he is her killer. The Machine stops her from acting on that, telling her that her lack of emotion and coldness was what Root admired of her, causing Shaw to shed a tear. She then instructs Shaw to leave the train on their next stop. However, Blackwell uses a knife to stab Fusco and escape although he is wounded by Shaw.

Back to the opening scene, Finch talks with the Machine, who manifests in Root's form to express her thoughts on death. However, he notices that the building does not have the antenna. Reese then reveals himself in an adjacent building with the antenna and the real briefcase, having been told by the Machine about the mission. Reese tells Finch he plans to sacrifice himself, as saving one life can make a real difference depending on the person. He starts uploading the Machine's copy just as Samaritan agents arrive to attack him with the Machine guiding Reese in God Mode. Reese is mortally wounded but the Machine copy is successfully uploaded. Finch then says goodbye to the Machine as it goes to stay with Reese in his last moments before the missile hits the building, killing Reese and the agents. The Machine's copy destroys Samaritan's copy on the satellite while the original Machine and Samaritan are both destroyed by the virus.

A week later, Senator Garrison (John Doman) is blamed for the events due to his association with Northern Lights while ICE-9 has been contained. Shaw locates Blackwell and kills him to avenge Root. She then meets with Fusco, who is recovering from his wounds, and it is clear neither of them know what happened to Reese and Finch. Finch decides to stop hiding and reveals himself to Grace (Carrie Preston), who is astounded to see him.

The Machine's copy—having survived the battle with Samaritan—returns to Earth, downloading into the computers in the empty station and receiving the messages that the original had left for it. Shaw is walking in the street with Bear when she hears a payphone ring. She answers and realizes the Machine is still alive. The Machine then starts analyzing the pedestrians as it did at the start of the series as Shaw and Bear disappear in the crowd.

== Production ==
=== Development ===
In May 2015, Person of Interest was renewed by CBS for a fifth season. Due to the limited 13 episode order and midseason replacement slot, executive producer J. J. Abrams was dubious about a sixth season, stating "My guess is it is the final season. The only heartbreak there is how much good story there was to come if it were to have continued. Jonah [Nolan] and Greg Plageman have done such an amazing job on that show. I know what these episodes are, that they're done wrapping it up. We don't yet have a schedule. But I know they will see the light of day, and people will get to see these episodes. I know the power of that story. Again, to have a show that goes on as many years as that has, it's very hard to complain. It's a miracle to get a show on the air and to have it last that long is something that we should just be grateful for. But I do love that show and I would've loved to see that continue." In August 2015, Michael Emerson explained how they approached the season, "I think because we're thinking of this like an ending — although I'm guessing it will be ambiguous enough to be pursued later on — it's an ending. Splashy endings usually involve casualties. So I think we're likely to either lose characters or have them somehow transformed." Co-star Jim Caviezel also expressed doubt on the final season announcement.

CBS then announced in March 2016 that the fifth season would be the show's last. Series creator Jonathan Nolan and executive producer Greg Plageman released a statement saying, ""We're extremely excited to be able share this final season with the fans. We're eternally grateful to our amazing cast and crew, as well as our partners at the studio and network. Most of all, we want to thank the show's fans — the best fans in the world. This subversive little paranoia-inducing cyberpunk-thriller is for you and would not have been possible without your support. As life has come to imitate Person of Interest, it's been our great privilege to work on show for the past five seasons. We can't wait for you to experience this thrilling and final chapter." On the same day, CBS officially set June 21, 2016 as the date for the series finale.

Series creator Nolan commented on the final season, explaining that despite being announced as the final one, they brought closure to the show, "It became abundantly clear to us that we were a part of a business model that did not work for the network anymore, despite loyal fans and the better part of 10 million people watching every week. We read the writing on the wall. We're in a very fortunate position to be able to write the end of the show, and write it in a way that it's not the very end of the story. I think with this many characters and a world as big as the one that we created with the show, you never say never. But we wanted to definitively end this chapter, this version of the show." Michael Emerson also talked about the season, saying, "We had to hurry up and end it. They had 13 episodes to turn a very large, slow-moving boat. But I think the idea that we had to do it in 13 was actually a plus rather than a minus. I think it allowed the writers' room to set aside their need to create palatable side stories or a murder-of-the-week or whatever, and really just get focused on wrapping up the loose ends of this thing."

In December 2015, it was announced that the final episode would be titled "return 0" and it would be written by Jonathan Nolan and Denise Thé with Chris Fisher serving as the director.

=== Writing ===
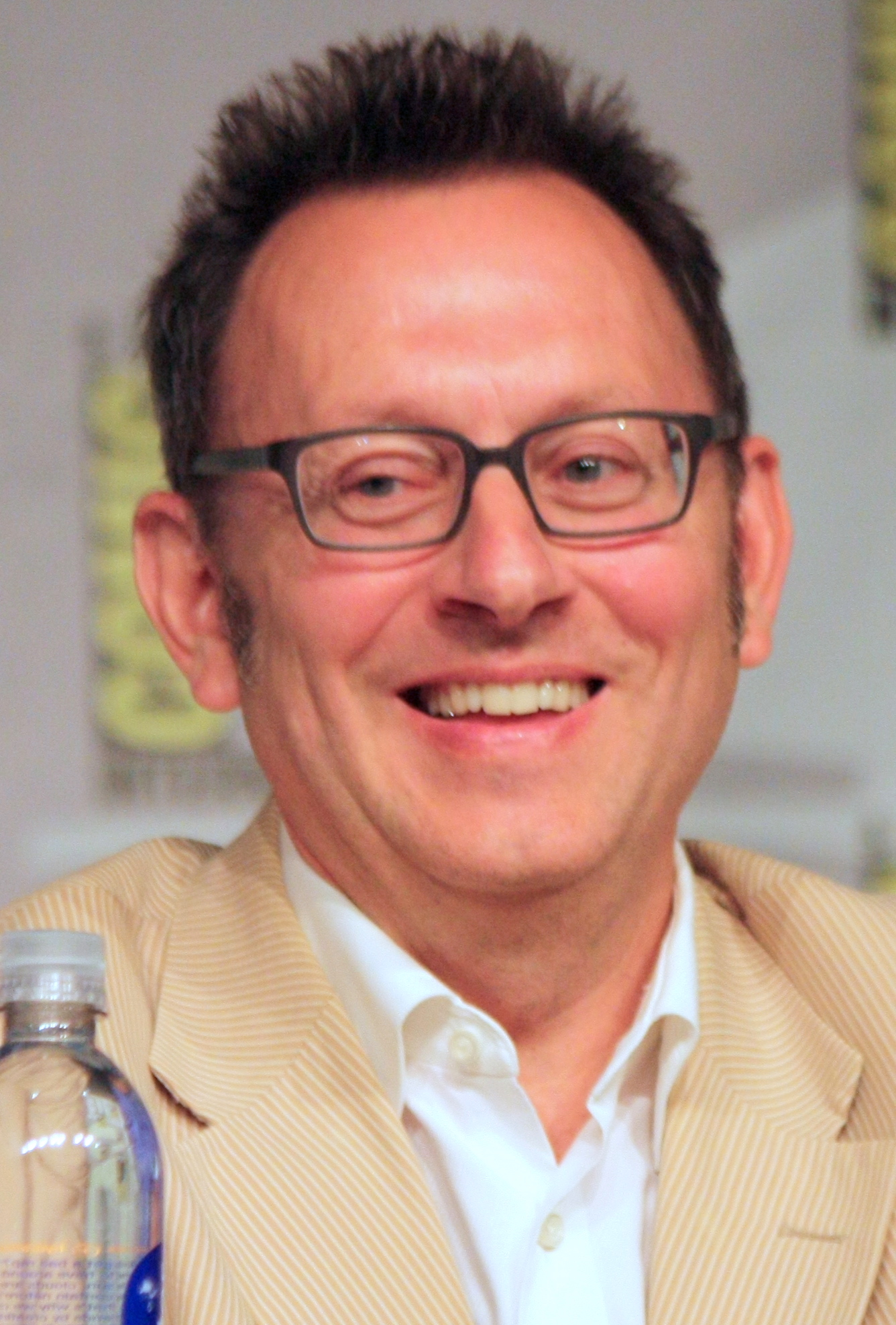
Michael Emerson commented that the finale "was really satisfying."

Before the finale aired, Nolan teased the finale, "we limp into the finale with some of our team intact. And some of them make it out. It's a bit of a bloodbath. It's delicious fun watching the final confrontation between these two titans: Samaritan and the Machine, and all of the folks who work for them. That kind of cataclysm of how do you stop an unstoppable force? And the answer is, through a great deal of sacrifice." He also added, "I don't think I've ever written a happy ending. We're not keen on happy endings here. Way back in the pilot, Finch promised that 'this will end messily for all of them' and I think we fulfilled the mandate." Michael Emerson also talked about the finale, saying "The ending, I thought, was really satisfying - and still ever so slightly open-ended, so that if someone, someday wanted to reboot this thing, or have a Chapter 2 of some sort, it wouldn't be out of the question. There are survivors... but not many." He also added, "I didn't know how they would wrap it up. I didn't feel the end coming, though I could feel the stakes rising. When I could finally see the end, I thought, 'oh my god, they're doing that'. The narrative dictates its own end. They honored the five years and their viewer's expectations."

Reese's death was written before the season was announced as the last one, with Nolan saying, "this relationship between Reese and Finch, from the beginning, has been so beautiful to write, and it's a slow burn, with these two great actors, this kind of odd couple. And what Finch has given to Reese and what Reese has tried to give back in return, is very moving to me. And the opportunity for Reese to repay that, as he says in the beginning of the episode, pay it back all at once, for me and for Greg I think, was just the most moving version of how this story ended. And yeah, it would just be bulls**t if they all made it out intact. What they've been doing is fighting against impossible odds. It would rob the ending of all meaning if it was happy endings all around." Nolan also commented, "You almost knew at some point in time that sort of sacrifice was going to be required in order for them to ultimately defeat Samaritan and for one to allow the other to go on. You get a sense that these guys are on a tragic journey - we announced it right from the pilot that they are not both going to make it." Nolan explained the decision to use Root as the Machine's form, "If the journey of the whole series had been from the Machine as a notion to a thing, a person, an intelligence, you really wanted to crystalize that. You really wanted to bring that moment to the fore. So there's no better actor to present that and no better character on our show, potentially with the exception of Finch himself, which I guess is another way the narrative could have gone, than Amy Acker, to have someone to convey all that complexity and all those multitudes contained within the Machine."

Executive producer Greg Plageman mentioned that despite the late announcement, the ending was exactly as they envisioned it, "It seemed to spring organically from the sacrificial nature of what Reese was doing. It felt right in terms of that relationship from the very beginning." Regarding the idea of a sequel series, Plageman said "I would say never say never in a world where we've seen the X-Files and 24 and a number of really strong premises come back as well." Nolan also debunked rumors that "Synecdoche" could serve as a spin-off, "We didn't want to do a spinoff. We've watched friends go through this where it’s like, the series is doing great, spin it off and then you wind up impoverishing both shows."

== Reception ==
=== Viewers ===
In its original American broadcast, "return 0" was seen by an estimated 6.51 million household viewers and gained a 1.0/4 ratings share among adults aged 18–49, according to Nielsen Media Research. This means that 1 percent of all households with televisions watched the episode, while 4 percent of all households watching television at that time watched it. This was a 4% increase in viewership from the previous episode, which was watched by 6.27 million viewers with a 1.0/4 in the 18-49 demographics. With these ratings, Person of Interest was the most watched show on CBS for the night, second on its timeslot and third for the night in the 18-49 demographics, behind Maya & Marty, and America's Got Talent.

With Live +7 DVR factored in, the episode was watched by 9.01 million viewers with a 1.5 in the 18–49 demographics.

=== Critical reviews ===
"return 0" received universal acclaim from critics. Matt Fowler of IGN gave the episode a perfect "masterpiece" 10 out of 10 rating and wrote in his verdict, "Person of Interest gave us the second half of Team Machine's final showdown with Samaritan... and it was exquisite. A fitting, moving end for a great series."

Alan Sepinwall of Uproxx wrote, "On the whole, 'Return 0' was an incredibly satisfying end to the story, and not just because it fulfilled Chekhov's famous rule about how if you introduce a decommissioned subway car in season 4, your characters must actually ride on it by the end of season 5. I'm glad I finally caught up, and glad I got to watch most of the final season in real time. This was a treat."

LaToya Ferguson of The A.V. Club gave the episode an "A" grade and wrote, "'return 0' is a perfect series finale. That's sort of a difficult thing to say, because a 'perfect series finale' is a difficult thing to create. But it's true. Even more so, 'return 0' is a very well-made episode of television. And as basic of a compliment as that sounds, that type of thing is something that's very rarely pointed out. It's all just well-directed, beautifully-acted, and best of all, an honestly-written episode of television and Person of Interest. Nothing feels forced or out of place, and if it does, there's a reason for that. Every single moment of the 'now' scenes in the episode are just so perfectly blocked and framed."

Chancellor Agard of Entertainment Weekly wrote, "There are many reasons to miss Person of Interest. It was great sci-fi in the sense that its world was only a few steps away from our present and commenting on it. Throughout its run, Person of Interest figured out how to juggle procedural and serialized storytelling pretty well (season 3 is a high point) and created strong and moving relationships at the same time. As the show makes clear, it may be ending, but it's not over, and these characters live on."

Sean McKenna of TV Fanatic gave the episode a perfect 5 star rating out of 5 and wrote "The finale delivered a satisfying ending to a smart and engaging show that became so much more than just a case-of-the-week ordeal. It brought the action, it tugged on the heartstrings, and it gave us characters worth investing in. Person of Interest was definitely a gem of a show that got to go out in fantastic fashion."

Writing on io9, Katharine Trendacosta noted that by the end of the series in 2016, Person of Interest had been transformed from a "crime-fighting show" with an entertaining plot device into "one of the best science-fiction series ever broadcast".
