= .exe (Person of Interest) =

- Person of Interest episode
- Episode no.: Season 5 Episode 12
- Directed by: Greg Plageman
- Written by: Greg Plageman; Erik Mountain
- Cinematography by: David Insley
- Editing by: Lola Popovac
- Production code: 3J6012
- Original air date: June 14, 2016
- Running time: 44 minutes

Guest appearances
- John Doman as Senator Ross Garrison; Brett Cullen as Nathan Ingram; John Nolan as John Greer; Michael Potts as Travers; David Aaron Baker as Agent Martin LeRoux; Michael McGlone as Detective Bill Szymanski; Robert Manning, Jr. as Zachary; Ebon Moss-Bachrach as Michael Cole; Jacob Pitts as Henry Peck; Alex Manette as Richard Barnett; Jean Brassard as Emile Bertrand

Episode chronology
← Previous "Synecdoche"	Next → "return 0"

".exe" is the 12th episode of the fifth season of the American television drama series Person of Interest. It is the 102nd overall episode of the series and is written by executive producer Greg Plageman and supervising producer Erik Mountain and directed by Plageman on his directorial debut. It aired on CBS in the United States and on CTV in Canada on June 14, 2016.

The series revolves around a computer program for the federal government known as "The Machine" that is capable of collating all sources of information to predict terrorist acts and to identify people planning them. A team follows "irrelevant" crimes: lesser level of priority for the government. However, their security and safety is put in danger following the activation of a new program named Samaritan. In the episode, Finch sets out to destroy Samaritan with a virus, despite knowing it will also kill the Machine. The title refers to ".exe", a common filename extension denoting an executable file for Microsoft Windows.

According to Nielsen Media Research, the episode was seen by an estimated 6.27 million household viewers and gained a 1.0/4 ratings share among adults aged 18–49. The episode received extremely positive reviews from critics, who praised the writing, directing, acting, use of the alternate scenarios and set-up for the finale.

== Plot ==
=== Alternate scenarios ===
During a talk with Finch (Michael Emerson) while he works on the ICE-9 virus, the Machine (Amy Acker) produces an alternate scenario where the Machine was never created.

In Finch's scenario, Ingram (Brett Cullen) is alive, their company is still active, Finch was not injured but feels saddened at feeling lost in the world and never met Grace.

In Fusco's (Kevin Chapman) scenario, he ratted out on HR to avoid prison, which led to their dismissal but he is reviled by the rest of the precinct. Szymanski (Michael McGlone) is still alive and they use new DNA database to solve crimes. In this scenario, Carter is still alive and for her actions in taking down HR, she was promoted to Lieutenant.

In Shaw's (Sarah Shahi) scenario, she still works for ISA with Michael Cole (Ebon Moss-Bachrach), who is still alive. She assassinates Henry Peck (Jacob Pitts) after he reveals his knowledge of a mass surveillance system. Due to this, she never met Root.

In Reese's (Jim Caviezel) scenario, he returned in time to the country to prevent Peter from killing Jessica. However, his past caught up with him and Jessica left him. Without a purpose in life, Reese killed himself a few months later.

In Root's scenario, she works for Greer (John Nolan) and Samaritan, who now expanded its reach. When Senator Garrison (John Doman) expresses concern for the purpose of Samaritan, Greer assigns Root to kill him. The Machine reveals to Finch that this is the true hidden darker nature of the world without the Machine: Samaritan still would've come into existence, but unopposed in its plans for world domination.

=== Real scenario ===
Reese and Shaw find that the Machine produced the number for Greer through an alias. They then receive the coordinates to Fort Meade and deduce that Finch may target the NSA and Greer. At the precinct, Fusco finds that the corpses at the tunnel were discovered, and Agent LeRoux (David Aaron Baker) has found out about his secret investigation. LeRoux reveals himself to be the killer and tries to kill Fusco who is saved by a bulletproof vest; Fusco subdues him but questions whether to kill him or let him live. (Note: In "return 0," Fusco heavily implies to Reese that he had in fact killed LeRoux in the end, but his ultimate fate is never confirmed.)

Finch infiltrates Fort Meade, but due to the building serving as a Faraday cage, loses contact with the Machine after he enters. He manages to gain access to the server room and starts uploading the virus. The virus is complete, but it requires a voice password confirmation, and Samaritan's agents arrive at the room to retrieve Finch. They take him to a base of operations in the building to meet Greer, who warns that Samaritan is working on something called "The Great Filter". Reese and Shaw have infiltrated Fort Meade and are instructed by the Machine to get to an evidence room to retrieve and set up a wireless modem, allowing the Machine access to the building to reconnect with Finch.

Greer once again tries to convince Finch to join Samaritan, but Finch refuses. However, their talk revealed that Finch is the only one who can activate the virus, and Greer locks himself and Finch in a room where their oxygen is removed by Samaritan. Greer dies from lack of oxygen, but Finch manages to escape thanks to the Machine. After evading the Samaritan agents, Finch instructs Reese and Shaw to leave the building while he goes to activate the virus. The reason behind the alternate scenarios was to convince Finch to activate the virus, as Samaritan would continue existing, but nothing would stand in its way. The Machine reveals that it has always known the password and could imitate Finch's voice to activate it, but has left the choice up to Finch. Despite knowing the virus will kill the Machine as well, Finch activates it and leaves Samaritan's base of operations as it starts glitching.

== Production ==
=== Development ===
The episode marked executive producer Greg Plageman's directorial debut and it was his last writing credit for the series. He said, "the big lesson I learned is if you ever get that feeling that you're completely terrified by doing something because you're not sure how it'll work out, then you should definitely do that thing. Because that was this episode for me. It certainly arrived at the perfect time for me since it was the second to last episode and it was something we'd talked about doing and it hadn't come up, so I thought 'Well, if I'm going to direct, I'm going to do that and I'm going to get Michael Emerson to be in, like, every scene.'" On the concept of the Machine never being created, Plageman said, "That was a lot of fun, extrapolating what that world would have looked like if Samaritan had emerged and become more dominant. And also, what's really fun is bringing back some people we missed from the past and seeing what would have happened to them."

=== Casting ===
Plageman revealed that the original concept for the episode involved the return of many characters including Annie Parisse as Kara Stanton and Michael Kelly as Agent Mark Snow but scheduling conflicts forced them to abandon some ideas.

== Reception ==
=== Viewers ===
In its original American broadcast, ".exe" was seen by an estimated 6.27 million household viewers and gained a 1.0/4 ratings share among adults aged 18–49, according to Nielsen Media Research. This means that 1 percent of all households with televisions watched the episode, while 4 percent of all households watching television at that time watched it. This was a 2% decrease in viewership from the previous episode, which was watched by 6.36 million viewers with a 1.0/3 in the 18-49 demographics. With these ratings, Person of Interest was the most watched show on CBS for the night, third on its timeslot and fifth for the night in the 18-49 demographics, behind To Tell the Truth, Maya & Marty, Uncle Buck, and America's Got Talent.

With Live +7 DVR factored in, the episode was watched by 8.75 million viewers with a 1.5 in the 18-49 demographics.

=== Critical reviews ===
".exe" received extremely positive reviews from critics. Matt Fowler of IGN gave the episode an "amazing" 9 out of 10 rating and wrote in his verdict, "The combination of alternate Machine-free lives and the final fifteen minutes (Finch vs. Greer, Finch in God Mode, Reese and Shaw as back up, Samaritan reaching out to Finch before its flickering demise) made '.exe' a tremendous penultimate chapter."

LaToya Ferguson of The A.V. Club gave the episode a "B+" grade and wrote, "Person of Interest takes all of those assumptions about what '.exe' will be like from that very first 'what if?' simulation and decides to flip them on their head. The 'what if?' simulations are still a part of the bigger decision, but unlike most versions of this story, Person of Interest doesn't make it easy to lean in one direction or the other."

Chancellor Agard of Entertainment Weekly wrote, "Is defeating Samaritan worth the price? That's one of several questions asked in tonight's penultimate episode, where Person of Interest explores what a world would look like without The Machine."

Sean McKenna of TV Fanatic gave the episode a 4.8 star rating out of 5 and wrote "It's bittersweet knowing that this exciting series is coming to and end, but the penultimate episode did a wonderful job of leading us into that final chapter."
