= Synecdoche (Person of Interest) =

- Person of Interest episode
- Episode no.: Season 5 Episode 11
- Directed by: Tim Matheson
- Written by: Jacey Heldrich & Joshua Brown
- Cinematography by: David Insley
- Editing by: Ryan Malanaphy
- Production code: 3J6011
- Original air date: June 7, 2016
- Running time: 43 minutes

Guest appearances
- Jimmi Simpson as Logan Pierce; Annie Ilonzeh as Harper Rose; Karen Pittman as Tracey Phillips; James Carpinello as Joey Durban; Will Brill as Charlie Vaida; L. Steven Taylor as Agent Barnes; Theis Weckesser as Agent Daniels

Episode chronology
← Previous "The Day the World Went Away"	Next → ".exe"

"Synecdoche" is the 11th episode of the fifth season of the American television drama series Person of Interest. It is the 101st overall episode of the series and is written by Jacey Heldrich & Joshua Brown and directed by Tim Matheson. It aired on CBS in the United States and on CTV in Canada on June 7, 2016.

The series revolves around a computer program for the federal government known as "The Machine" that is capable of collating all sources of information to predict terrorist acts and to identify people planning them. A team follows "irrelevant" crimes: lesser level of priority for the government. However, their security and safety is put in danger following the activation of a new program named Samaritan. In the episode, Reese, Shaw and Fusco are sent to Washington to protect the President from a threat while Finch goes on a road trip with the Machine. The title refers to "synecdoche", a figure of speech in which a term for a part of something refers to the whole of something or vice versa.

According to Nielsen Media Research, the episode was seen by an estimated 6.36 million household viewers and gained a 1.0/3 ratings share among adults aged 18–49. The episode received very positive reviews from critics, who viewed the episode as a "love letter for the fans" of the show and a decent closure to the procedural aspect of the show.

== Plot ==
Reese (Jim Caviezel) and Fusco (Kevin Chapman) are the only ones who attend Root's funeral and set out to find Shaw (Sarah Shahi) and Finch (Michael Emerson). In Kentucky, Finch is revealed to be on a road trip with the Machine (Amy Acker) to an unknown destination, still grieving over Root's death.

Reese finds Shaw in the playground where she took Root in her simulations. She exposes herself on camera so Samaritan can find her but the Machine sent her new aliases to protect her. Just then, a payphone rings and they receive a new number: the President of the United States. Reese, Shaw and Fusco head to Washington, D.C. for a fundraising event which the President will attend. Shaw uses an invitation from the Machine to enter while Reese enters thanks to Logan Pierce (Jimmi Simpson), who has been pressured by the NSA to reveal data information. Shaw and Reese find a bomb hidden in a brick and hide it so it can't injure anyone, and alert the President to leave. Broadcast signals are then hacked by the terrorists, who warn that they'll kill the President tomorrow if his surveillance system program isn't cancelled.

Reese and Shaw take one of the waiters, Charlie Vaida (Will Brill), who behaved suspiciously at the event. Shaw tortures him and Charlie confesses to being associated with a group. Charlie escapes as part of their plan as they placed a GPS tracker on him, which leads them to a house in Dupont Circle. Shaw infiltrates the house and discovers that the terrorists are a group of citizens who are against the mass surveillance program and are relative amateurs rather than experienced criminals. Fusco arrives and both subdue them although the plan is still happening as the President is arriving at a plaza.

Reese arrives at the plaza, where he runs into Joey Durban (James Carpinello). The team discovers that the terrorists plan to kill the President by nuking his car with an incoming UAV. To prevent the President from reaching the car, Shaw shoots at the president, which forces him to stay on the ground as the UAV rams the car. After evading Secret Service agents, they are cornered by the terrorists. However, Joey subdues them and helps them escape the plaza by posing as military officials. Shaw then expresses her concerns to Reese that Samaritan considered the President "irrelevant" and intends to destroy Samaritan.

In San Antonio, Texas, Finch arrives at a highly secured government facility of the Twenty-Fourth Air Force with a weaponized virus capable of destroying Samaritan. He is almost caught on his way out but he buys a guard's silence by promising to help his ill daughter. Back in Washington, Joey takes Reese to his partners: Logan Pierce and Harper Rose (Annie Ilonzeh) the latter of whom helped Fusco escape the Secret Service. The three former POIs reveal that they were recruited by the Machine as a second team chasing numbers. The Machine had sent Reese's irrelevant number to Joey, Logan and Harper and they had been secretly helping in the background as a result. The six discuss their enlistment by the Machine, what has happened, and what is to come before Logan provides the team with their next number: Finch. As Logan, Joey and Harper leave, the team prepares for their final battle against Samaritan.

== Reception ==
=== Viewers ===
In its original American broadcast, "Synecdoche" was seen by an estimated 6.36 million household viewers and gained a 1.0/3 ratings share among adults aged 18–49, according to Nielsen Media Research. This means that 1 percent of all households with televisions watched the episode, while 3 percent of all households watching television at that time watched it. This was a 5% decrease in viewership from the previous episode, which was watched by 6.66 million viewers with a 1.0/4 in the 18-49 demographics. With these ratings, Person of Interest was the most watched show on CBS for the night, third on its timeslot and fifth for the night in the 18-49 demographics, behind Maya & Marty, 20/20, The Bachelorette, and America's Got Talent.

With Live +7 DVR factored in, the episode was watched by 8.89 million viewers with a 1.5 in the 18-49 demographics.

=== Critical reviews ===
"Synecdoche" received very positive reviews from critics. Matt Fowler of IGN gave the episode a "great" 8.5 out of 10 rating and wrote in his verdict, "'Synecdoche' gave Team Machine a change of scenery and probably the biggest name they could ever get as a 'number' in an effort to help Shaw see the true danger of Samaritan. As someone who, in the past, has occasionally sided with Samaritan tactics, and has since had her brain scrambled by the thing, she was in dire need of a reset following last week's huge loss. And so allowing the president, the institution she previously risked her life for, to come to harm was a great 'this has gone too far' moment for her. Also TEAM FACSIMILE FTW!"

LaToya Ferguson of The A.V. Club gave the episode a "B+" grade and wrote, "'Synecdoche,' despite what happened in the previous episode, is arguably a fun episode of Person of Interest. It's not a light episode by any means, but as far as a number episodes go, it takes the show out of that particular world on a high-note. It's fast-paced, and Reese, Fusco, and Shaw all play their parts in the mission super well. And on the scale of things in the episode that aren't ultimately heartbreaking, it's always great to see Fusco remind the audience just how competent he actually is at his job and as a member of the team."

Chancellor Agard of Entertainment Weekly wrote, "The numbers never stop coming, not even when Team Machine has to grieve. 'Synecdoche' picks up very soon after the events of the tragic 100th episode."

Sean McKenna of TV Fanatic gave the episode a 4.3 star rating out of 5 and wrote "This was a surprisingly case of the week type episode, considering how close we are to the end of the series, but Person of Interest was able to blend the focus on the number and some larger story aspects to keep me invested enough and entertained."
