= Pilot (Person of Interest) =

- Person of Interest episode
- Episode no.: Season 1 Episode 1
- Directed by: David Semel
- Written by: Jonathan Nolan
- Production code: 296807
- Original air date: September 22, 2011
- Running time: 45 minutes

Guest appearances
- Leon Addison Brown as Charles Robinson; Chris Chalk as Lawrence Pope; Jermaine Crawford as Michael Pope; Michael Drayer as Anton O'Mara; James Hanlon as Detective James Stills; Brian d'Arcy James as James Wheeler; Kristine Johnson as herself; Gregory Lay as Transit cop; Bruce MacVittie as Defense Attorney; Anthony Mangano as Detective Kane; Susan Misner as Jessica Arndt; Charlie Moss as Judge; Kevin Murphy as Anton's friend; Alfredo Narciso as Forensic Tech; William Sadler as Seamus O'Mara; Wolfgang Scheitinger as Henry Wheeler; Louis Vanaria as Detective Louis Azarello; Natalie Zea as Diane Hanson

Episode chronology
← Previous —	Next → "Ghosts"

"Pilot" is the first episode of the crime drama television series Person of Interest. It originally aired on CBS in the United States on September 22, 2011. The episode was written by series creator Jonathan Nolan and directed by David Semel.

Reviews for the episode were largely positive. In the United States, the series premiere achieved a viewership of 13.33 million.

== Plot ==
John Reese (Jim Caviezel), a former CIA Agent and United States Army Special Forces soldier-turned homeless alcoholic, has a struggle with a group of hot-headed teenagers on the subway in New York City. After this, he is extracted from police custody before New York Police Department Homicide Detective Joss Carter (Taraji P. Henson) can confront him on his links to previous killings discovered through analysis of his fingerprints on the police system.

Reese is brought to a mysterious and secretive billionaire, Harold Finch (Michael Emerson), who eventually reveals that he is the creator of a powerful AI known simply as "The Machine". After 9/11, Finch developed a computer program that can sift through enormous amounts of data, looking for patterns of behavior or activity that would predict another attack. It also provided information about individuals who could be in danger; it can predict the identity of a person involved in a premeditated crime that will happen at some point in the future – however, Finch's back-door link to the Machine only provides the Social Security number of the person, and offers no clues to their involvement or when the crime will take place.

Finch, who feels a need to do something to help these people, enlists Reese to aid him in preventing these crimes. Finch offers Reese employment, as well as giving Reese a purpose following the death of his girlfriend, Jessica (Susan Misner) (which is the source of his depression).

The first on his list is Diane Hansen (Natalie Zea), an Assistant District Attorney currently working on a major prosecution of a prominent drug killing. Reese agrees to help and begins watching her. Reese soon learns that Hansen is not the victim, but the perpetrator, running a ring of corrupt police officers and planning to kill a fellow DA, Wheeler (Brian d'Arcy James).

Reese intervenes in the attempted murder of Wheeler, in the process saving two other intended victims (an ex-con they'd been planning to frame for Wheeler's murder, and Wheeler's young son who happened to be with him that day) but also killing Detective Stills (James Hanlon), the leader of the corrupt gang of cops.

To wrap up the case, Reese sneakily reveals Hansen's corruption to an open court. He also blackmails one of the corrupt officers, Detective Lionel Fusco (Kevin Chapman), by linking him to Stills' murder in a way that ensures his cooperation (forcing Fusco to hide the body), into becoming Reese's source of information inside the NYPD.

Though Finch offers Reese the opportunity to quit at this point, Reese decides to continue working for him. He agrees to continue preventing violent crimes.

== Reception ==
=== Ratings ===
In its original American broadcast, "Pilot" was seen by an estimated 13.33 million household viewers and gained a 3.1 ratings share among adults aged 18–49, according to Nielsen Media Research.

=== Critical reception ===
David Wiegand of the San Francisco Chronicle wrote: "Person of Interest separates itself from the gimmick pack, not only because of superbly nuanced characterization and writing but also because of how it engages a post-9/11 sense of paranoia in its viewers." David Hinckley of the New York Daily News gave the pilot four stars out of five, commenting on Caviezel's and Emerson's performances, saying Caviezel "brings the right stuff to this role" and Emerson "is fascinating as Mr. Finch." Mary McNamara of the Los Angeles Times stated that in regards to the pilot, "the notion of preventing crimes rather than solving them is an appealing twist... The surveillance graphics are very cool."
