= Overnight (2003 film) =

2003 documentary film

- Theatrical release poster
- Directed by: Tony Montana; Mark Brian Smith
- Written by: Tony Montana; Mark Brian Smith
- Produced by: Tony Montana; Mark Brian Smith; Todd Fossey
- Starring: Troy Duffy; Tony Montana; Mark Brian Smith
- Cinematography: Mark Brian Smith
- Edited by: Tony Montana; Mark Brian Smith; Jeff Roe; Kevin Finn
- Music by: Jack Livesey; Peter Nashel
- Production companies: Black & White Pictures; Tony Montana Films; Ether Films; Ronnoco Productions
- Distributed by: ThinkFilm
- Release date: June 12, 2003 (U.S.)
- Running time: 82 minutes
- Country: United States
- Language: English

Overnight is a 2003 American documentary film by Tony Montana and Mark Brian Smith. The film details several years in the life of filmmaker and musician Troy Duffy, the writer-director of The Boondock Saints (1999), and was filmed at his request.

Duffy is presented as a victim of his own ego: as the documentary progresses and his fortunes fade during the troubled production and distribution of The Boondock Saints, he becomes increasingly abusive to his friends, relatives, and business partners.

== Plot ==
In 1997, bartender, musician, and aspiring screenwriter Troy Duffy successfully sells his script for The Boondock Saints to Miramax chief Harvey Weinstein for US$300,000 and is taken on by the William Morris Agency. Though Duffy has never made a film or formally studied the subject, Weinstein agrees to let him direct the film with a US$15 million budget. Moreover, Duffy's band The Brood will produce the soundtrack and sign a recording contract with Maverick Records. Weinstein also agrees to buy J. Sloan's, the Los Angeles bar where Duffy works, and will hire him to run it. Meanwhile, Duffy asks friends Tony Montana and Mark Brian Smith to manage The Brood and document his activities on film.

Duffy initially enjoys his new success, entertaining celebrities at his bar, dining at hotel restaurants, and moving into a production office where he holds teleconferences with major film producers. The movie deal quickly turns sour, largely due to his own arrogance and increasingly abusive behavior. Believing himself to be the next power-player in Hollywood, he is filmed insulting actors who are in consideration for roles in his film, including Ethan Hawke and Keanu Reeves. Duffy repeatedly mispronounces Kenneth Branagh's name, before simply calling him "cunt", and also disparages producers such as Jerry Bruckheimer. When the film fails to go into production as quickly as Duffy would like, he threatens to leave William Morris in favor of a rival agency, and alienates both Weinstein and his own production team through abrasive behavior. He later receives word of rumors that Weinstein has had him informally blacklisted. Miramax puts the film in turnaround, conference calls are refused, and soon Duffy is without any film industry contacts at all.

Duffy's musical efforts are equally ill-fated. Famed guitarist Jeff "Skunk" Baxter expresses interest in producing The Brood, singling out lead vocalist Taylor Duffy for particular praise. During recording sessions with Baxter and producer Ron Saint Germain, Duffy attempts to wrest control away from them, ignores any advice that contradicts his own opinions, and refuses to listen to Baxter's concerns about the band's heavy alcohol consumption. After being dropped by Maverick Records, Duffy and his band are signed to Atlantic Records. Renaming themselves The Boondock Saints, their debut CD sells only 690 copies, and they are dropped from the label shortly before disbanding.

In 1998, Duffy is finally able to obtain financing for the film through Franchise Pictures, although the budget totals less than half of Miramax's offer. The Boondock Saints is promoted at the 1999 Cannes Film Festival, but all the major American distribution companies pass on it. The film manages to receive a limited release in five cities, but performs poorly and is pulled from distribution after a week before being released on DVD and VHS. On the night of the film's screening at the Palm Springs International Film Festival, a car jumps the curb and collides with Duffy and producer Chris Brinker; neither are seriously injured, while the car and its driver remain unidentified.

Although the film becomes a sleeper hit on home video, Duffy's contract with Franchise Films stipulates he cannot profit from the film's television, home media, or foreign sales. He eventually spends all of the money he earned from his film and record deals, his bar closes, and he is unable to secure any work in Hollywood within six years after the production of The Boondock Saints.

== Cast ==
- Troy Duffy
- Tony Montana
- Mark Brian Smith
- Taylor Duffy
- Tate Duffy
- Tyson Duffy
- Marie Duffy
- Gordon Clark
- Jimi Jackson
- Chris Brinker
- Dave Zerr
- Jim Crabbe
- Ramses Ishak
- Joel Roman
- Cassian Elwes
- Shaun Hill
- Sharon Waxman
- Jeff "Skunk" Baxter
- Ron Saint Germain
- Eric Greenspan
- Jason Flom
- Sean Patrick Flanery
- Norman Reedus
- David Della Rocco
- Billy Connolly
- Ron Jeremy
- Willem Dafoe
- Mark Wahlberg
- Jake Busey
- John Goodman

== Reception ==
Overnight received positive reviews. On Rotten Tomatoes, it has a 78% fresh rating, based on 77 reviews. The consensus says, "This absorbing but wince-inducing documentary is a cautionary tale about the costs of hubris in the world of indie film." Metacritic, which uses a weighted average, assigned the film a score of 60 out of 100, based on 22 critics, indicating "mixed or average" reviews.

Roger Ebert of The Chicago Sun-Times gave Overnight 3-out-of-4 stars, writing, "[Duffy's] family, we sense during one scene, has been listening to this blowhard for a lifetime, and although they are happy to share his success, they're sort of waiting to see how he screws up. ... So are we."

Comedian Adam Carolla listed Overnight as one of his favorite films in his 2010 book In 50 Years We'll All Be Chicks, describing Duffy's behavior as a case study for how fame and money can lead to negative consequences. In November 2011, Carolla released an interview with Troy Duffy on his podcast The Adam Carolla Show. Duffy acknowledged he was not on his best behavior while the documentary was filming, but insisted that Overnight was edited unfairly to make him appear like a "boorish asshole."

Comedian and filmmaker Nathan Fielder commented, "That's one of my favorites... I just think it's one of those ones that anyone who's trying to get into film should just watch. It should be the first thing they show when people start film school -- not for necessarily how it's made, but just for showing how your attitude about things can destroy a great thing potentially."
