= Turnaround (filmmaking) =

Film production phase

Turnaround in filmmaking is the use of outside assistance to resolve problems preventing a film project from completing its development phase and entering the pre-production phase. A project stuck in development phase is said to be in development hell.

== Background ==
The outside help needed to get a film project into turnaround may appear in the form of new money being invested into a project in development hell, or it might come along as another outside studio taking interest in a project which the original studio may find difficult to move forward into the pre-production phase. When an outside source takes over a film project from development hell in one studio and transfers the film project to another studio which is willing to invest further resources to move the project into pre-production, then the project is said to have gone through a 'turnaround'. The film project can now move forward out of development hell in one studio into the pre-production phase of filmmaking at another studio.

The term 'turnaround' is borrowed from business operations and management consulting where it is used to describe business ventures which are in some form of insolvency and require a 'business turnaround' or 'management turnaround' to become profitable and make a 'turnaround' in business performance. In the case of the filmmaking process, the transfer of the film project from development hell, at one studio, leading to the project receiving a green light to begin pre-production, at another studio, is referred to as a 'turnaround' for that film.

== Informal descriptions ==
A 'turnaround' or 'turnaround deal' is occasionally used to describe an arrangement in the film industry whereby the production costs of a project that one studio has developed are declared a loss on the company's tax return, thereby preventing the studio from exploiting the property any further. The rights can then be sold to another studio in exchange for the cost of development plus interest.

== Examples ==
Michael Cieply defined the term in The New York Times as "arrangements under which producers can move a project from one studio to another under certain conditions". Some examples include:

- Columbia Pictures stopped production of Steven Spielberg's E.T. the Extra-Terrestrial, but Universal Pictures picked up the film and made it a success.
- Back to the Future was under development at Columbia Pictures, while Columbia was developing a satire of the Universal-owned noir film Double Indemnity (1944) called Big Trouble (1986). Its similarities to Double Indemnity meant the studio would violate Universal Pictures' copyright. With production imminent, Columbia asked for the rights from Universal; in exchange, Universal obtained the rights to Back to the Future. The film wound up being a hit.
- Dirty Dancing began development at Metro-Goldwyn-Mayer, but management changes at the studio put the film in limbo. Vestron Pictures eventually picked up the film and it was a success.
- Total Recall originally began work at De Laurentiis Entertainment Group (DEG), but after DEG suffered some box-office failures like Dune and filed for bankruptcy in 1988, actor Arnold Schwarzenegger convinced Carolco Pictures to buy the film. The film was a hit.
- Home Alone and Edward Scissorhands were originally developed under Warner Bros., but the studio shut down the projects after their budgets increased. 20th Century Fox took control of Home Alone after secret meetings with producer and screenwriter John Hughes, and it was a hit. Warner Bros. also sent Edward Scissorhands to 20th Century Fox after Tim Burton collaborated with Warner Bros. on Pee-wee's Big Adventure, Beetlejuice, and Batman (1989).
- The 1993 film My Life's in Turnaround, starring Donal Lardner Ward, Eric Schaeffer, Martha Plimpton and Phoebe Cates, tells the story of two friends who attempt to sell the story of their lives to a variety of studios.
- Tim Burton's Ed Wood was originally in development at Columbia Pictures, but the studio put the film in "turnaround" over Burton's decision to shoot in black-and-white. Ed Wood was taken to Walt Disney Studios, which produced the film through its Touchstone Pictures label. The film became a box-office failure.
- Quentin Tarantino's Pulp Fiction began production at TriStar Pictures, but the studio turned it down after deeming the script to be "too demented". Miramax Films co-chairman Harvey Weinstein picked up the project and it was a success.
- Carolco Pictures sold off the rights to several films in production, including Stargate (to Le Studio Canal+ and Metro-Goldwyn-Mayer), Last of the Dogmen, and Showgirls (the latter, to Chargeurs). This was done due to their financial troubles and in order to fund their next big-budget film, Cutthroat Island. Cutthroat Island wound up being a massive box-office bomb and led to the demise of Carolco Pictures.
- The turnaround of The Boondock Saints is documented in Overnight, a 2003 documentary that mainly focuses on the perspective of how director Troy Duffy "fell" in Hollywood.
- The Lord of the Rings film trilogy originally began development at Miramax Films, but after Miramax Films co-chairman Harvey Weinstein tried to force the project into one film, director Peter Jackson argued his way until Weinstein agreed to allow Jackson to take the project to New Line Cinema, and was a massive success.
- Spider-Man began development at Metro-Goldwyn-Mayer, but the studio put it in turnaround due to a massive and financial mess on bankrupt studios, Columbia Pictures picked up the film and made it a success.
- Over the Hedge originally began production at Fox Animation Studios, however after the studio closed down after the failure of Titan A.E., DreamWorks Animation picked up the film and it became a hit.
- After the rights to adapt Stephenie Meyer's novel Twilight were purchased by MTV Films in 2004, they were optioned by Paramount Pictures where it remained in turnaround before they let the rights lapse in 2007. Summit Entertainment picked them up and released Twilight in 2008.
- Watchmen originally began development at 20th Century Fox before moving to Warner Bros., where it remained in development hell for over two decades before it was finally released in 2009.
- An adaptation of At the Mountains of Madness was in the works at DreamWorks Pictures in 2004 with Guillermo Del Toro attached to produce, co-write and direct but it went into turnaround; By 2010, Universal Pictures had bought the project and James Cameron attached to produce. By 2011, Tom Cruise was attached to star and test footage and concept art was crafted but Universal Pictures believed a horror skewing, R-rated film was unprofitable with a $150 million budget and cancelled it. In 2022, Del Toro shared test footage produced for the film. Del Toro owns the rights and still hopes to get the movie made.
- The 2012 film Argo makes several references to the film that was faked for the 1980 CIA Iranian hostage extraction operation as being "in turnaround".
- Sonic the Hedgehog was originally in development at Columbia Pictures, however, after putting the film in turnaround, Paramount Pictures picked up the film and it became a box office success.
- Vivo was originally developed at DreamWorks Animation, but was cancelled due to the restructuring at the company. It was later revived by Sony Pictures Animation and was successful.
- A film adaptation of Mouse Guard, to be directed by Wes Ball, was greenlit by 20th Century Fox and was two weeks away from filming when Walt Disney Pictures - having finalised its purchase of 20th Century the prior month - decided to cancel it in 2019 and allow the producers to shop it elsewhere. Unfortunately, no other studio ultimately picked it up.
- Cattywumpus, an animated science fiction comedy about cats in outer space was in development at Netflix and was to be directed by Gore Verbinski. In 2022, Netflix decided not to proceed with the project and allowed Verbinski and team to shop the project elsewhere to no avail. In 2025, Verbinski revealed he was developing it independently and had a cast set.
- Nimona (2023) was in active production at Blue Sky Studios when Disney chose to shut the studio down and halt production of Nimona. Netflix and Annapurna Pictures later came on-board to finish the film.
- Deeper, a deep-sea supernatural thriller written by Max Landis, originated in 2016 with Metro-Goldwyn-Mayer producing and distributing. However, following sexual abuse allegations against Landis, MGM dropped the film in 2020. Four years later, Warner Bros. Pictures initially picked up the film with Tom Cruise attached to produce and star in it, but dropped out when Cruise demanded too high of a budget; Cruise was allowed to shop the project elsewhere to no avail.
- The 2026 film The Bluff was initially bought by Netflix in 2021. They put it in turnaround and the project was bought by Amazon MGM Studios three years later in 2024, which made the film.
- The Bride! (2026) was initially set at Netflix. However, Netflix ultimately balked at the films raising production costs and allowed the creatives to shop it elsewhere and Warner Bros. Pictures picked it up and produced it.
- The 2026 Masters of the Universe was in development at Columbia Pictures for over a decade before being put in turnaround and being shopped to Netflix, which in turn put the film in turnaround again over budget concerns, before Amazon MGM Studios bought the film.
- Paris Paramount was in development at Netflix but was put in turnaround when the director, Nancy Meyers insisted on an increased budget beyond what Netflix was initially committed to. Several years later, Warner Bros. Pictures picked up the abandoned project.
- K-Pop: The Debut was in development at 20th Century Studios but let the project go in July 2025, Paramount Pictures picked up the project.
