= Cheryl Chin =

Singaporean television and film actress

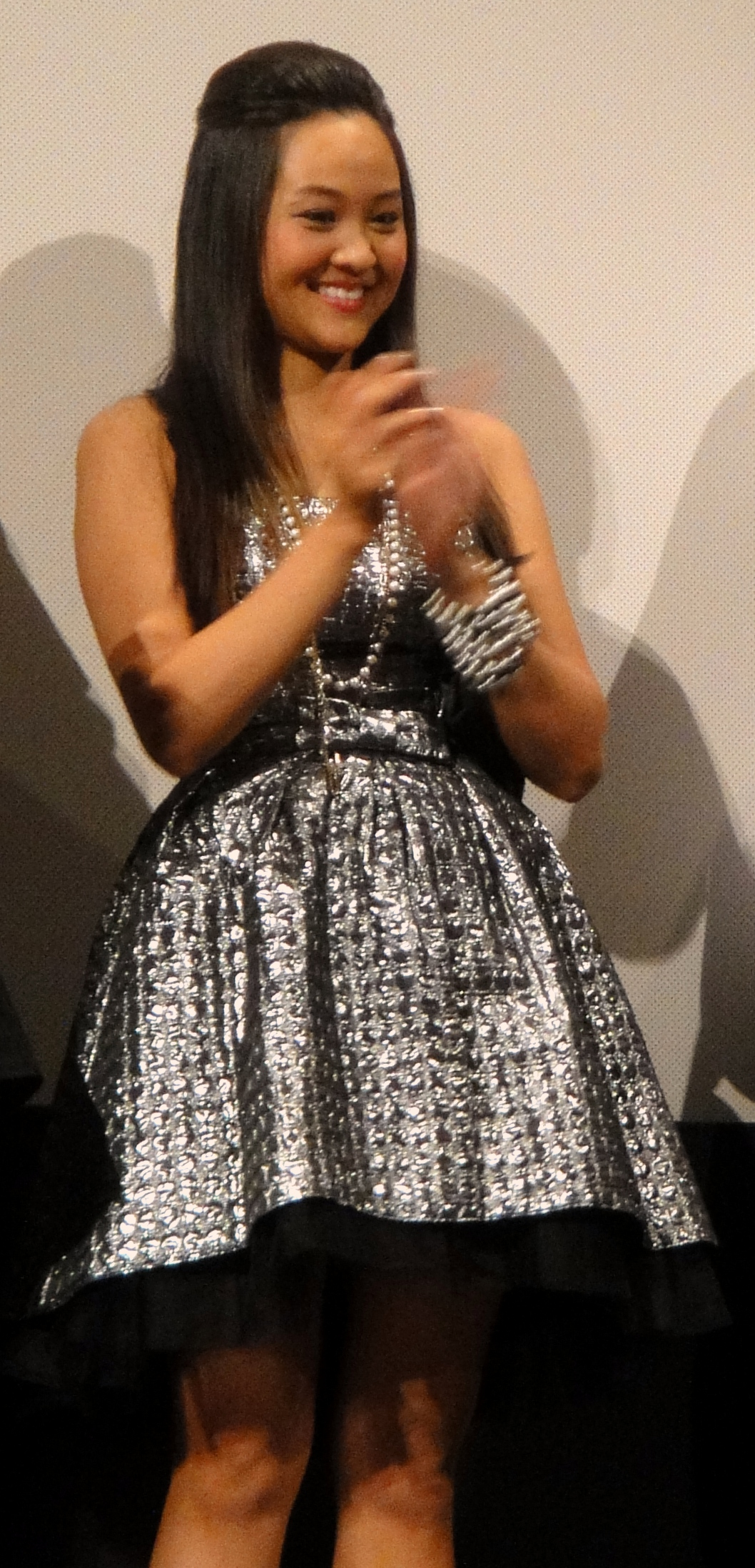
- Cheryl Chin at the Austin Film Society in 2010
- Born: Singapore
- Partner(s): Brandon Fernandez (former); Lee Smith (former)

Cheryl Chin is a Singaporean television and film actress. She was formerly known as a Singapore television actress and fashion model who competed in and won the Star Search Singapore finals in 2003. She also received the best actress award.

She has appeared mostly on Singapore's television drama and comedy series. In 2010, she appeared in Mongolian Death Worm, directed by Steven R. Monroe, starring Sean Patrick Flanery, and Machete, directed by Robert Rodriguez, starring Danny Trejo, Steven Seagal, Jessica Alba, and Robert De Niro.

== Early life ==
Chin was born in Singapore to Irene and Albert Chin. Both her mother and father are of Chinese descent, though her father was born in Kuala Lumpur, Malaysia. Chin has a younger brother, Sean. Because of her father's roots, she was raised in Malaysia for 3 years and then settled in Singapore until the age of 11. Chin grew up without both grandparents. Her grandmother died in the first plane crash of Singapore Airlines' history, and she was told her grandfather died of a broken heart.

Chin attended Convent of the Holy Infant Jesus, an all-girls Catholic school, from first through eighth grade. In 2001, her mother remarried an American and the family migrated to Virginia in 1993. In 2001, in an attempt to pursue an acting career, Chin made a bargain with her mother that allowed her to return to Singapore for six months with all expenses paid to audition for roles. If she could not make a living from acting within the six months, she would have to attend an American business university. On the last day of her 6-month period, she won her first acting role in a theatre production for a cruise ship.

== Career ==
Shortly after, Chin received starring roles in Singapore's prime time television series such as: Singapore's longest running comedy TV series, Under One Roof, the hit TV movie Blueprint anthology series – Scars, School Days hit comedy TV series, and The Outsiders, an independent slasher film.

She was listed by FHM Magazine as one of the 100 Sexiest Women in the World in 2003 and 2004. She entered the Singaporean version of the TV talent show Star Search in 2003 and won the Best Acting Potential Award together with the Female Champion Award, becoming Singapore's representative for Star Search Asia Grand Finals. Chin won the first runner-up title and an artist contract with Mediacorp, Singapore's national television studios, to be part of their stable of performers. Under Mediacorp's management, she received her first dramatic role in An Ode To Life as Weng Xiaoyun, a muddle-headed nurse who unexpectedly falls into a love triangle. An Ode To Life was shown in 2004 on Mediacorp Television and later won the best dramatic television series award.

She went on to star in the 13-episode comedy series The Cheer Team, broadcast in 2004, as Miss Bai, a cheerleading teacher who was inappropriate for the job. While shooting The Cheer Team, she was offered a role in The Best Bet, a 14-episode Singaporean television series, as Lina Zhang, the love interest of both Christopher Lee's and Mark Lee's characters.

As her contract with Mediacorp came to an end in 2004, she completed filming of The Best Bet and returned to America. During her four years in Singapore, Chin appeared in four films, six television series, and four variety shows.

After taking a break for three years, she worked on two films in 2009: Mongolian Death Worm, a TV movie ordered by the Syfy Channel, and Machete, which was released in August 2010. Machete marked Chin's first villainous role.

She was the female champion of Star Search Singapore Finals 2003, was ranked No. 93 on FHM Singapore's 100 Sexiest Woman of the World 2003, and No. 90 in FHM Singapore's 100 Sexiest Woman of the World 2004.

Since moving to the U.S., Chin started a food truck called DFG Noodles, based in Austin, Texas. The truck serves noodle and rice dished inspired by Singaporean, Malaysian, and Indonesian cuisine.

== Personal life ==
While in Singapore, Chin began a 2-year relationship with Brandon Fernandez, a veteran stage actor. Chin then met Lee Smith, a British businessman, in 2003, soon after winning Star Search Singapore. Their relationship ended shortly before Chin returned to the US in 2005.

Chin met Wes Thompson when she hired him as her Director of Photography on a pilot production.

Chin was raised as a Buddhist, Christian, and Catholic. Her great-grandmother was Buddhist, her mother is Catholic, and her father is Christian. During childhood, Chin was close friends with her neighbour, Samantha, who is an Indonesian Christian. Chin would follow her to an Indonesian church where an interpreter's services were employed every weekend in order for her to understand the pastor. At the age of 11, Chin asked to be baptised as a Christian.

== Filmography ==
Year	Project	Role	Notes	Ref
2010	Beneath the Darkness	Nurse Josie		
2010	Dad Camp	As Self		
2010	Machete	Torrez Henchwoman		
2010	Mongolian Death Worm	Thuan		
2008	The 2 Bobs	Boneshredder		
2005	The Best Bet	Lina Zhang		
2004	The Cheer Team	Miss Bai		
2004	An Ode to Life	Weng Xiaoyun		
2004	World of Wonders	Multiple Roles	Guest Star	
2004	Let's Party with Food	Host		
2003	The Last Wedding	Weng Xiaoyun		
2003	The Outsiders	Samantha Teo		
2003	Blueprint - Scars	Best Friend		
2003	Under One Roof Season 7	Wendy		
2003	Blueprint - Scars	Hui	Principal photography	
2002	School Days	Angel Tan		
