= Norman Reedus =

American actor (born 1969)

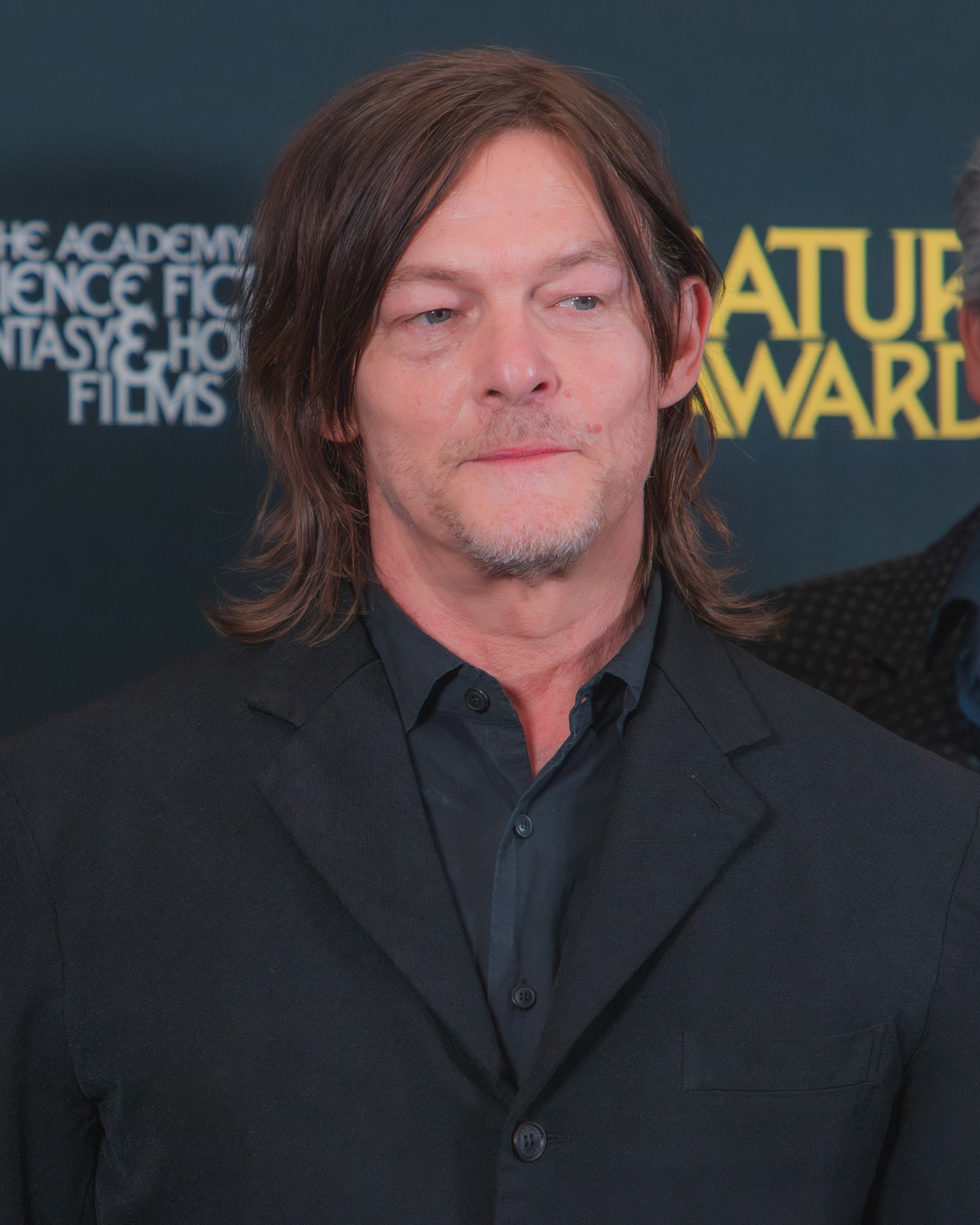
- Reedus in 2026
- Born: Norman Mark Reedus; January 6, 1969 (age 57); Hollywood, Florida, U.S.
- Occupation: Actor
- Years active: 1992–present
- Partner(s): Helena Christensen (1998–2003); Diane Kruger (2016–present)
- Children: 2
- Website: normanreedusonline.com

Norman Mark Reedus (born January 6, 1969) is an American actor. Starting his career as a model, he first rose to prominence as an actor for his role as Murphy MacManus in The Boondock Saints (1999), which he reprised in The Boondock Saints II: All Saints Day (2009). Aside from an occasional supporting role in larger budget films such as Blade II (2002) and American Gangster (2007), Reedus mostly starred in independent film productions until being cast as Daryl Dixon in the AMC horror drama series The Walking Dead (2010–2022). Regarded as one of the series' most popular characters, he currently stars as Dixon in the spin-off series The Walking Dead: Daryl Dixon (2023–present).

Reedus is also the host of the AMC travel show Ride with Norman Reedus (2016–2025) and starred as protagonist Sam Porter Bridges in the video games Death Stranding (2019) and Death Stranding 2: On the Beach (2025).

== Early life, family and education ==
Norman Mark Reedus was born on 6 January 1969 in Hollywood, Florida, the son of Marianne (née Yarber), a teacher and former Playboy bunny, and Ira Norman Reedus. His parents divorced when he was young. He has a sister, Leslie.

As a teen, Reedus lived in Japan with his mother.

== Career ==
Reedus worked at a Harley-Davidson shop in Venice, Los Angeles, California, and contributed artwork to various shows as a painter, photographer, sculptor, and video artist. He first acted in the play Maps for Drowners at the Tiffany Theater on Sunset Boulevard.

=== Film and television ===
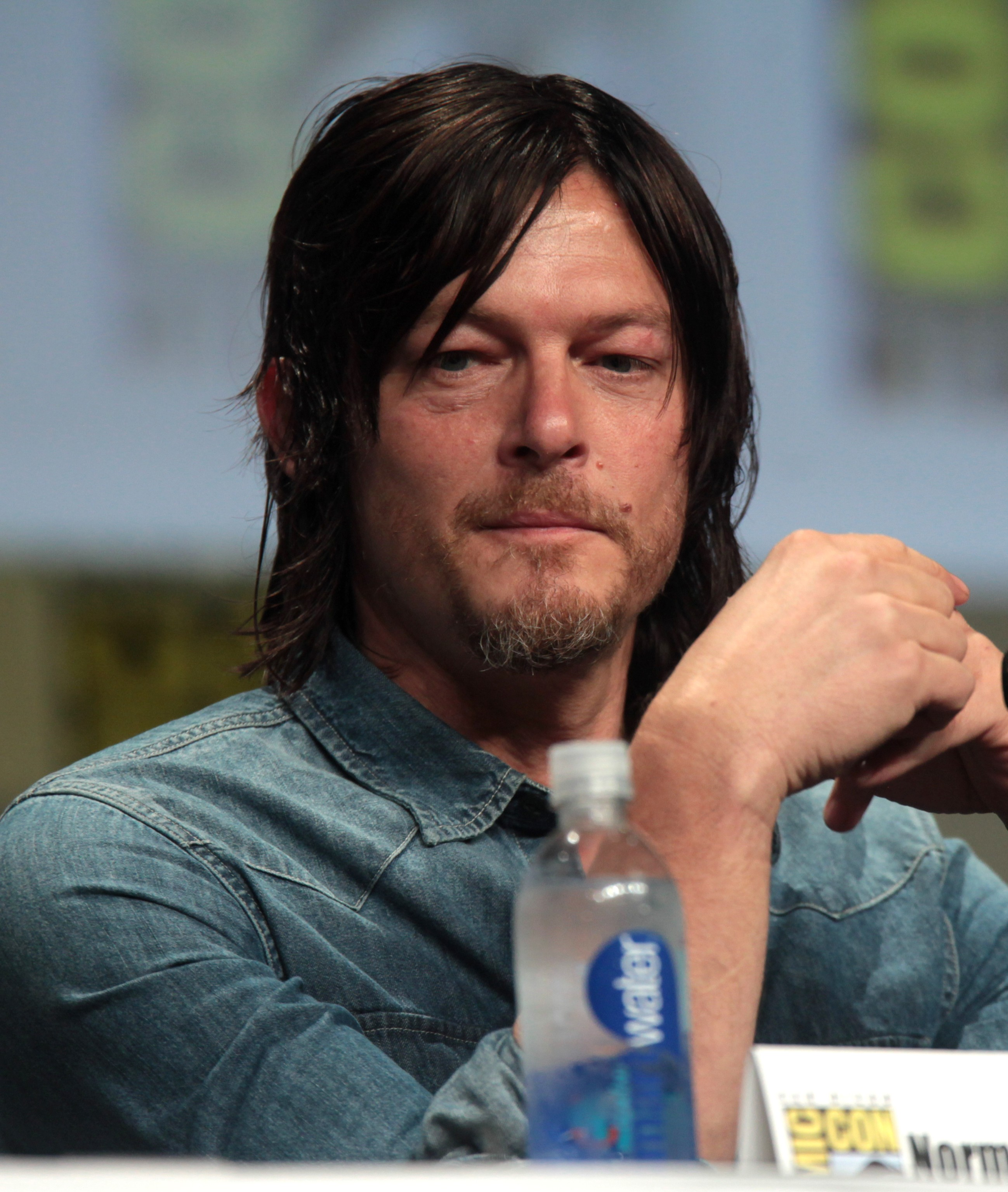
Reedus in 2014

Reedus played Jeremy in his major film debut Mimic and Mac in Giovanni Rodriguez's Red Canyon. He played Murphy MacManus in the 1999 film The Boondock Saints. In 2005, he starred as the main protagonist in the hour-long "Cigarette Burns", a John Carpenter-directed episode of Masters of Horror, in which his character seeks a uniquely cursed lost film about an imprisoned fallen angel. He reprised the role of MacManus in the 2009 sequel The Boondock Saints II: All Saints Day. He played Scud in Blade II. He guest-starred in Charmed as Nate, the boyfriend of Paige (Rose McGowan). Reedus starred in Hello Herman, which opened nationwide and on-demand on June 7, 2013. Reedus stars in the reality series Ride with Norman Reedus, which premiered in June 2016. Most recently, he started Bigbaldhead Productions with an overall deal at AMC.

Reedus played Daniel Pine in the 2025 John Wick spin-off Ballerina, alongside Keanu Reeves and Ana de Armas. In March 2024, Thunder Road Films, Dragonfly Films and Impossible Dream Entertainment announced a "reimagining" of The Boondock Saints, with Reedus and co-star Sean Patrick Flanery reprising their roles from the first two films and serving as executive producers, although Troy Duffy would not return as director for the third film; instead, he plans to write a series of novels.

==== The Walking Dead ====
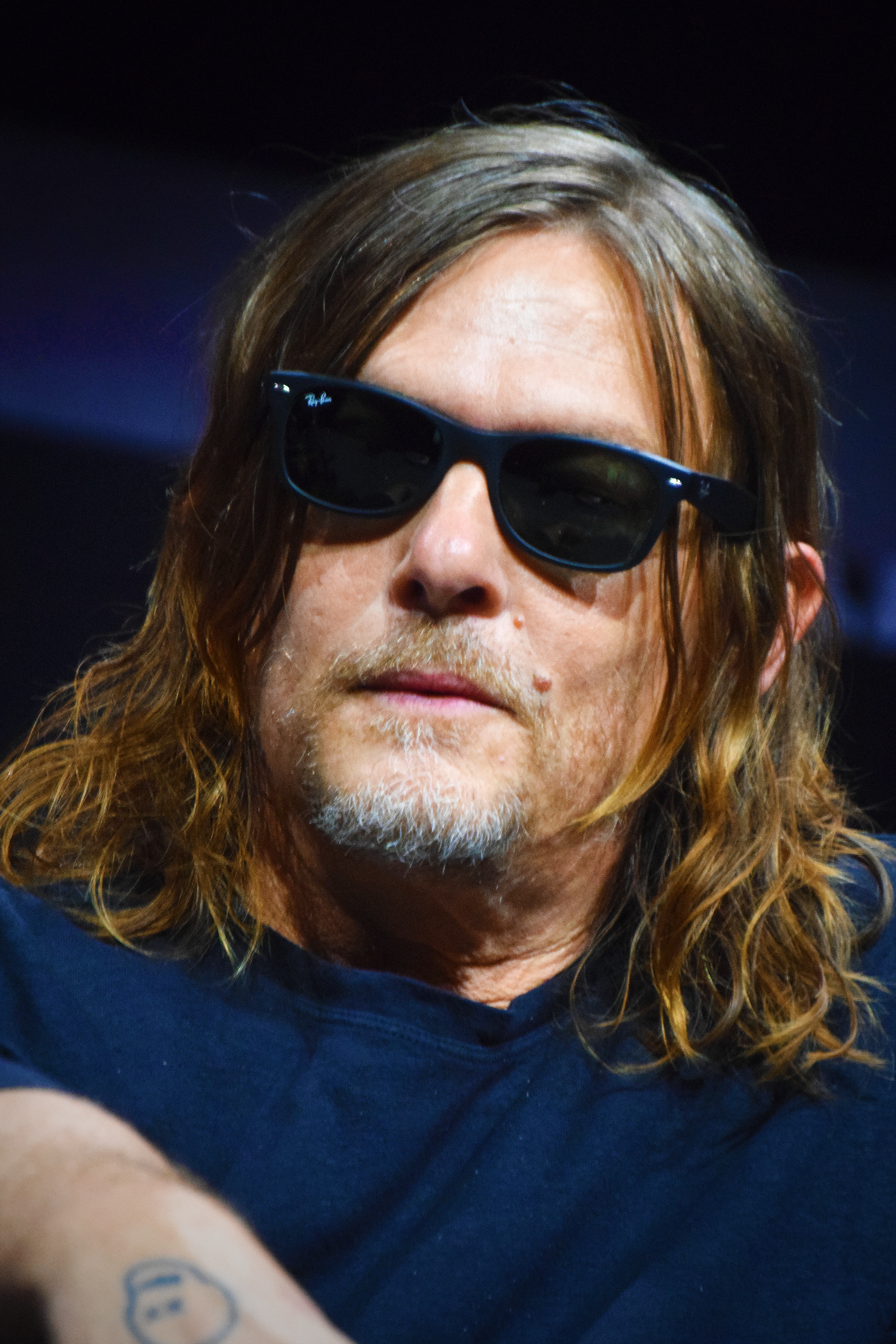
Reedus in 2023

In 2010, Reedus began playing Daryl Dixon in the AMC television series The Walking Dead, a horror drama about a group of friends and family members who fight to survive in a violent apocalyptic world populated with flesh-eating zombies and the few surviving humans. The character was not originally in the comic book series of the same name, but was created specifically for Reedus after his audition for the character of Merle Dixon. The Walking Dead comic creator Robert Kirkman feels "absolutely blessed Reedus has honored the show with his presence, and the way he has come in and taken over that role and defined Daryl Dixon. A lot of Reedus's portrayal of the character in the first season inspired all the writers to do what we did with him in the second season. We love writing him and end up doing cool stuff with him." The drama has evolved into the highest-rated in cable history, smashing all previous records. Reedus was nominated for a Saturn Award for Best Supporting Actor for his performance and has overall received critical acclaim for the role.

Reedus reprised his role of Daryl as the lead of a spin-off series centered on his character, following the conclusion of the 11th and final season of The Walking Dead. Angela Kang is the showrunner for the series, which debuted in September 2023.

=== Modeling, music videos, and art ===
Reedus has modeled for Prada, Yohji Yamamoto, Alessandro Dell'Acqua, Durban, Levi's, Lexus, and Morgenthal Fredrics. In 2015, Reedus posed for a Cruelty Free International advertisement in support of ending cosmetic tests on animals.

In the mid-1990s, while working as a model, Reedus appeared in the music videos for "Wicked as It Seems" by Keith Richards, "Violently Happy" by Björk, "Flat Top" by Goo Goo Dolls, "Cat's in the Cradle" covered by Ugly Kid Joe, "Strange Currencies" by R.E.M., and "Fake Plastic Trees" by Radiohead. In 1999, he appeared in the video for "Mean to Me" by Tonic. Since achieving fame as an actor, he has also appeared in the videos for "Judas" by Lady Gaga, "Sun Down" by Tricky (feat. Tirzah), "Gypsy Woman" by Hilary Duff, "No Cities to Love" by Sleater-Kinney, and "Curse of the Blackened Eye" by Orville Peck.

Reedus is also a painter, sculptor, and photographer who has shown his artwork in galleries in New York City, Barcelona, Berlin, and Frankfurt. He released a book of photography on October 31, 2013, called The Sun's Coming Up... Like a Big Bald Head. In September 2014, Reedus announced a fan-art compilation called Thanks for All the Niceness.

=== Video games ===
In 2014, it was revealed that Reedus was set to star in Hideo Kojima and Guillermo del Toro's horror game Silent Hills, but Kojima departed Konami and the game was canceled in 2015. Reedus went on to reunite with Kojima to star in the videogame Death Stranding (2019) where he takes the role of Sam Porter Bridges, the protagonist of the game, a courier tasked with reconnecting a post-apocalyptic United States. Reedus reprises his role in the game's sequel, Death Stranding 2: On the Beach (2025).

Reedus has also reprised his role as Daryl Dixon in the 2013 video game The Walking Dead: Survival Instinct, which is based on the television series, and has additionally provided his likeness as Daryl for Fortnite Battle Royale, Call of Duty: Modern Warfare III, and Dead by Daylight.

=== Author ===
In 2022, Reedus released his debut novel The Ravaged.

== Personal life ==
Reedus was in a five-year relationship with Danish-Peruvian ex–Victoria's Secret Angel and supermodel Helena Christensen from 1998 to 2003. Despite reports to the contrary, the two were never married. Together they have a son, born in 1999. They remained friends and shared joint custody of their son until he reached adulthood.

Reedus owns part of the restaurant chain Nic and Normans.

In February 2005, Reedus sustained a head injury when a truck collided with his car in Germany. His nose was reconstructed with the aid of four screws and his left eye socket with titanium.

In 2015, during the filming of Sky, Reedus met German actress Diane Kruger; the two were first seen together as a couple in July 2016. In November 2018, Kruger gave birth to their daughter, his second and her first child. Reedus has lived in New York City since 1997.

== Filmography ==
=== Film ===
Year	Title	Role(s)	Notes	Ref.
1997	Floating	Van		
1997	Mimic	Jeremy		
1997	Six Ways to Sunday	Harold		
1998	I'm Losing You	Toby		
1998	Dark Harbor	Young Man		
1998	Davis Is Dead	Larry		
1999	Let the Devil Wear Black	Brautigan		
1999	8mm	Warren Anderson		
1999	The Boondock Saints	Murphy MacManus		
2000	Beat	Lucien Carr		
2000	Gossip	Travis		
2000	Preston Tylk	Jonathan Casey		
2000	Sand	Jack		
2001	The Beatnicks	Nick Nero		
2002	Luster	Sextools Delivery Boy		
2002	Blade II	'Scud'		
2002	Deuces Wild	Marco Vendetti		
2003	Nobody Needs to Know	Kurt		
2003	Tough Luck	Archie		
2003	Octane	Recovery Man		
2003	Overnight	Himself	Documentary film	
2004	Until the Night	Robert		
2004	Great Wall Great Medicine	Norman		
2005	A Lot like Love	Emily's Ex At Airport	Uncredited role	
2005	Antibodies	Polizist Schmitz		
2005	The Notorious Bettie Page	Billy Neal		
2006	Walls	Henry Flesh	Short film	
2006	A Crime	Vincent Harris		
2006	I Thought of You	Unknown	Short film; also writer and director	
2006	Killer Queen	Jack Trust		
2007	American Gangster	Detective Norman Reilly		
2007	Moscow Chill	Ray Perso		
2008	Hero Wanted	Swain	Direct-to-video film	
2008	Meet Me in Berlin	Unnamed American	Short film	
2008	Red Canyon	Mac		
2008	Dead*Line	Seth	Short film	
2008	Clown	Lucien	Short film	
2008	Cadillac Records	Chess Records Engineer		
2008	Echoes of Extinction	Eric Richards		
2008	Styrofoam Soul	Joe		
2009	The Chase	Dangerous Guy		
2009	Messengers 2: The Scarecrow	John Rollins	Direct-to-video film	
2009	Pandorum	Shepard		
2009	The Boondock Saints II: All Saints Day	Murphy MacManus		
2010	Meskada	Dennis Burrows		
2010	The Conspirator	Lewis Payne		
2010	Ollie Klublershturf vs. The Nazis	Barry	Short film	
2010	8:28 AM	Stranger		
2011	Hello Herman	Lax Morales		
2012	Night of the Templar	Henry Flesh		
2013	Iron Man: Rise of Technovore	Frank Castle / Punisher	Voice role; direct-to-video film	
2013	Sunlight Jr.	Justin		
2013	Pawn Shop Chronicles	Stanley		
2014	Stretch	Himself	Cameo appearance	
2015	Vacation	Truck Driver	Cameo appearance	
2015	Air	Bauer	Also executive producer	
2015	Sky	Diego		
2016	Triple 9	Russel Welch		
2017	Alien Invasion: S.U.M.1	K.E.R.4	Voice role	
2023	The Bikeriders	Funny Sonny		
2025	Ballerina	Daniel Pine		
2027	Pendulum	TBA	Post-production	
TBA	Untitled Takashi Miike film	TBA	Filming	

Key
†	Denotes films that have not yet been released

=== Television ===
Year	Title	Role(s)	Notes	Ref.
2003	Charmed	Nate Parks	Episodes: "Sense and Sense Ability" & "Necromancing the Stone"	
2005	Masters of Horror	Kirby Sweetman	Episode: "Cigarette Burns"	
2006	Law & Order: Special Victims Unit	Derek Lord	Episode: "Influence"	
2006	13 Graves	Norman	Television film	
2009	The Chase	Dangerous Guy #1	Episode: "The Final Chapter"	
2010	Hawaii Five-0	Anton Hesse	Episode: "Pilot"	
2010–2022	The Walking Dead	Daryl Dixon	Recurring role (season 1), Main role (seasons 2–11), 148 episodes	
2016	American Dad!	Tim	Voice role; Episode: "Hayley Smith, Seal Team Six"	
2016	Turbo Fast	Wild Pete	Voice role; Episode: "The Good, The Bad, and the Bugly"	
2016	Voltron: Legendary Defender	Rolo	Voice role; Episode: "Taking Flight"	
2016–2025	Ride with Norman Reedus	Himself (host)	Travel Docuseries; 37 episodes	
2017	Robot Chicken	Daryl Dixon, Dale Horvath	Voice role; Episode: "The Robot Chicken Walking Dead Special: Look Who's Walking"	
2018	Ballmastrz: 9009	Bacchus LaBrute	Voice role; Episode: "Leather Passions! 2 Hearts, 2 Wheelz, Infinite Roadz. Ride Now!"	
2021	Helluva Boss	Striker	Voice role; Episode: "The Harvest Moon Festival"	
2021	The Walking Dead: Origins	Himself	Episode: "Daryl's Story"	
2023–present	The Walking Dead: Daryl Dixon	Daryl Dixon	Lead role; 19 episodes (also executive producer)	

=== Video games ===
Year	Title	Role(s)	Notes	Ref.
2013	The Walking Dead: Survival Instinct	Daryl Dixon	Based on the TV series	
2014	P.T.	Protagonist	Motion capture, voice and likeness	
2019	Death Stranding	Sam Porter Bridges	Motion capture, voice and likeness	
2020	The Walking Dead: Onslaught	Daryl Dixon	Voice and likeness	
2020	Fortnite Battle Royale	Daryl Dixon	Likeness	
2021	State of Survival	Daryl Dixon	Hero model	
2024	Call of Duty: Modern Warfare III	Daryl Dixon	Playable character (DLC); voice and likeness	
2025	Death Stranding 2: On the Beach	Sam Porter Bridges	Motion capture, voice and likeness	
2025	Dead by Daylight	Daryl Dixon	Playable character; voice and likeness	
2025	World of Tanks	Daryl Dixon	Commander with custom voice lines	
2026	World War Z	Daryl Dixon	Playable character (DLC); voice and likeness	

=== Music videos ===
Year	Title	Artist	Role(s)	Ref.
1992	"Wicked as It Seems"	Keith Richards	N/A	
1994	"Violently Happy"	Björk	N/A	
1995	"Strange Currencies"	R.E.M.	N/A	
1995	"Fake Plastic Trees"	Radiohead	N/A	
2011	"Judas"	Lady Gaga	Judas Iscariot	
2014	"Sun Down"	Tricky		
2015	"It Just Feels"	Jihae	N/A	
2020	"Don't Chase the Dead"	Marilyn Manson	N/A	
2021	"Never Look Back"	Run the Jewels	N/A	
2022	"The Curse of the Blackened Eye"	Orville Peck	The Curse	

== Awards and nominations ==
Year	Award	Category	Work	Result	Ref.
1997	New England Film & Video Festival	Special Jury Award for Best Acting Performance	Floating	Won	
1998	Gotham Awards	Breakthrough Actor	Six Ways to Sunday	Nominated	
2012	Saturn Awards	Best Supporting Actor on Television	The Walking Dead	Nominated	
2012	Satellite Awards	Best Television Ensemble (shared with cast)	The Walking Dead	Won	
2012	IGN Awards	Best TV Hero	The Walking Dead	Won	
2012	IGN People's Choice Awards	Best TV Hero	The Walking Dead	Won	
2014	EWwy Awards	Best Supporting Actor	The Walking Dead	Nominated	
2014	New York City Horror Film Festival	Lifetime Achievement Award		Won	
2015	Saturn Awards	Best Supporting Actor on Television	The Walking Dead	Nominated	
2015	Fangoria Chainsaw Awards	Best TV Supporting Actor	The Walking Dead	Won	
2017	Saturn Awards	Best Supporting Actor on a Television Series	The Walking Dead	Nominated	
2018	Critics' Choice Television Awards	Best Unstructured Reality Series	Ride with Norman Reedus	Nominated	
2019	People's Choice Awards	The Male TV Star of 2019	The Walking Dead	Nominated	
2019	People's Choice Awards	The Drama TV Star of 2019	The Walking Dead	Nominated	
2019	The Game Awards	Best Performance	Death Stranding	Nominated	
2020	British Academy Games Awards	Performer in a Leading Role	Death Stranding	Nominated	
2020	D.I.C.E. Awards	Outstanding Achievement in Character	Death Stranding	Nominated	
2022	Hollywood Walk of Fame	Television	The Walking Dead	Won	
2024	Saturn Awards	Dan Curtis Legacy Award	The Walking Dead	Won	
2025	Saturn Awards	Best Actor in a Television Series	The Walking Dead: Daryl Dixon	Nominated	
