= Bob Marley (comedian) =

American comedian (born 1967)

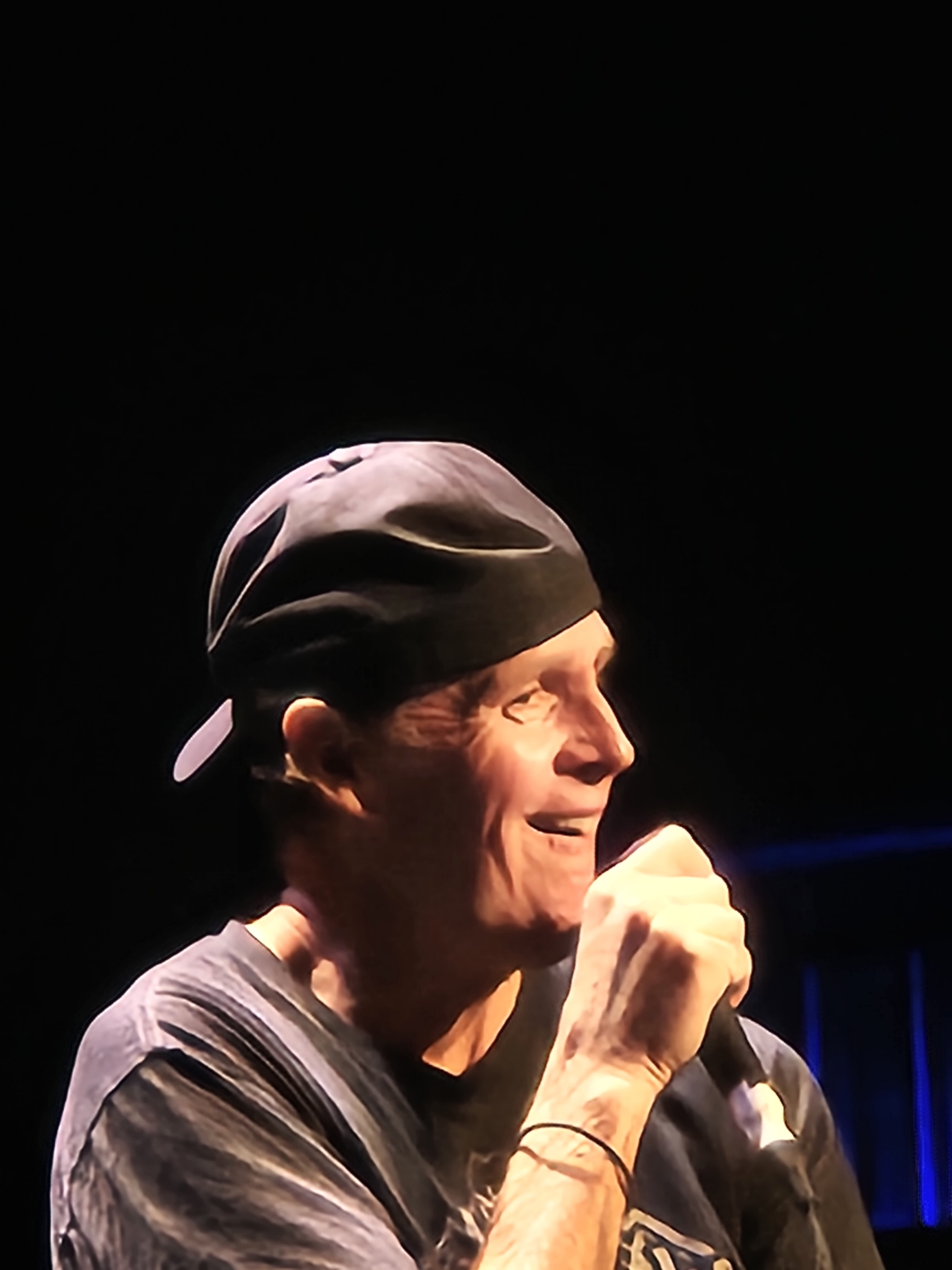
- Education: University of Maine at Farmington
- Occupations: Comedian, actor
- Website: www.bmarley.com

Bob Marley is an American comedian. He has appeared on The David Letterman Show, Late Night with Conan O'Brien, and Comedy Central. As an actor, he appeared in the film The Boondock Saints and its sequel.

== Personal life ==
Marley grew up in Bangor, Maine before moving to Portland, Maine. Marley said his "dad had no idea there was a singer named Bob Marley." He attended the University of Maine at Farmington, where he realized he wanted to pursue comedy as his career.

As his career was taking off, Marley moved to California and lived there for several years, but moved back to Maine in 2005. His third child was born shortly before the family moved back.

== Career ==
Marley's comedy routines are mostly about life in Maine. His first television appearance was on Comedy Central. He also appeared as Detective Greenly in the movie The Boondock Saints, and reprised this role in The Boondock Saints II: All Saints Day.

He has been a guest host on XM Radio channels 97, Blue Collar Radio, and 99, RawDog Comedy; and, as of 2013, appears weekly on the Portland-based station Coast 93.1-WMGX in a segment called "The World According to Bob."

== Personal achievements ==
On Thursday, September 23, 2010, at 11:02 pm EDT, Marley entered the Guinness Book of World Records with the longest continuous stand-up routine, beating the record held by Lindsay Webb from Australia. He completed 40 hours of comedy, the first 17 hours and 14 minutes without any repetition of material. Marley's record was broken by David Scott on April 30, 2013, with a time of 40 hours and 8 minutes.

== Television ==
- Badly Dubbed Porn
- The Dink Show with Tyler Dama
- Spider Man: Return Of The Mongols
- Late Show with David Letterman
- Late Night with Conan O'Brien
- The Late Late Show with Craig Kilborn
- MAD TV
- Prime Time Live with Diane Sawyer
- NBC's Showcase
- Rodney Dangerfield's Comedy Cure on TBS
- Mars and Venus with Cybill Shepherd
- The Martin Short Show
- Comedy Central Presents
- Shorties Watchin' Shorties
- The Late Late Show
- Comics Unleashed
- Late Night with Jimmy Fallon

== Filmography ==
- The Breaks (1999)
- The Boondock Saints (1999)
- Liar's Club (2001)
- The Boondock Saints II: All Saints Day (2009)

== Discography ==
- 3000 Shows Later (1997)
- All New Stuff (1998)
- Up Against the Brick Wall (1999)
- Sold Out! (2000)
- Live at Merrill Auditorium (2001)
- Comedian Bob Marley Live (previously released material) (2002)
- I'm Tellin' You (2002)
- Dude...Don't Be Such a Dink! (2003)
- Greatest Hits Vol.1 (DVD) (2003)
- Put the Boots to 'Er (2004)
- Greatest Hits Vol.2 (DVD) (2004)
- Upta Camp (2005)
- Greatest Hits Vol.3 (DVD) (2005)
- Naughty Pine aka Worldwide (CD/DVD combo) (2006)
- Don't Feed The Native (previously released material) (2006)
- Goin' Up the Faya (2007)
- Big Mouth Bob (CD/DVD combo) (2008)
- Runamuck (2008)
- Maine-iac on the Loose (2008)
- Drop It Haahd (CD/DVD combo) (2009)
- 15 Years in Comedy (box set) (2009)
- Weirdo (2010)
- Minivan Owner (CD/DVD combo) (2010)
- New England's King Of Comedy (2011)
- Guinness World Champ (CD/DVD Combo) (2011)
- Irish Curse (2011)
- Wicked Funny with Greatest Hits Vol.4 (CD/DVD combo) (2012)
- Traveling Hooligan (2013)
- Mouth Farts (2014)
- Down One Nut (2015)
