= Bad Country =

- Blu-Ray Disc cover
- Directed by: Chris Brinker
- Written by: Jonathan Hirschbein
- Produced by: Chris Brinker; Kevin Chapman
- Starring: Matt Dillon; Willem Dafoe; Neal McDonough; Amy Smart; Tom Berenger
- Music by: John Fee
- Production company: CB Productions
- Distributed by: Mandalay Pictures
- Release date: April 29, 2014
- Running time: 95 minutes
- Country: United States
- Language: English
- Budget: $6.7 million

Bad Country (also known as Whiskey Bay) is a 2014 American crime drama film based on a true story starring Matt Dillon, Willem Dafoe, Neal McDonough, Amy Smart, and Tom Berenger. The film started shooting in Baton Rouge and Angola, Louisiana on August 7, 2012.

== Plot ==
When Baton Rouge police detective Bud Carter arrests contract killer Jesse Weiland, he convinces Jesse to help the police to destroy the South's most powerful crime ring. When the syndicate orders Carter's death and Weiland is identified as an informant, the two team up to fight the mob and catch the crime boss who ordered the hit.

== Cast ==
- Matt Dillon as Jesse Weiland
- Willem Dafoe as Bud Carter
- Neal McDonough as Kiersey
- Amy Smart as Lynn Weiland
- Tom Berenger as Lutin Adams
- Bill Duke as John Nokes
- Kevin Chapman as Morris
- Christopher Denham as Tommy Weiland
- Chris Marquette as Fitch
- Alex Solowitz as Buzz McKinnnon
- Don Yesso as Captain Bannock
- John Edward Lee as Catfish Stanton
- Jean Moolman as Hank Jones

== Production ==
The film was in post-production when director Chris Brinker died suddenly on February 8, 2013. Brinker was to be presented with the Robert Smalls Indie Vision Award at the 7th annual Beaufort, South Carolina International Film Festival in February 2013. The film is dedicated to his memory.
