= Kevin Chapman =

American actor (born 1962)

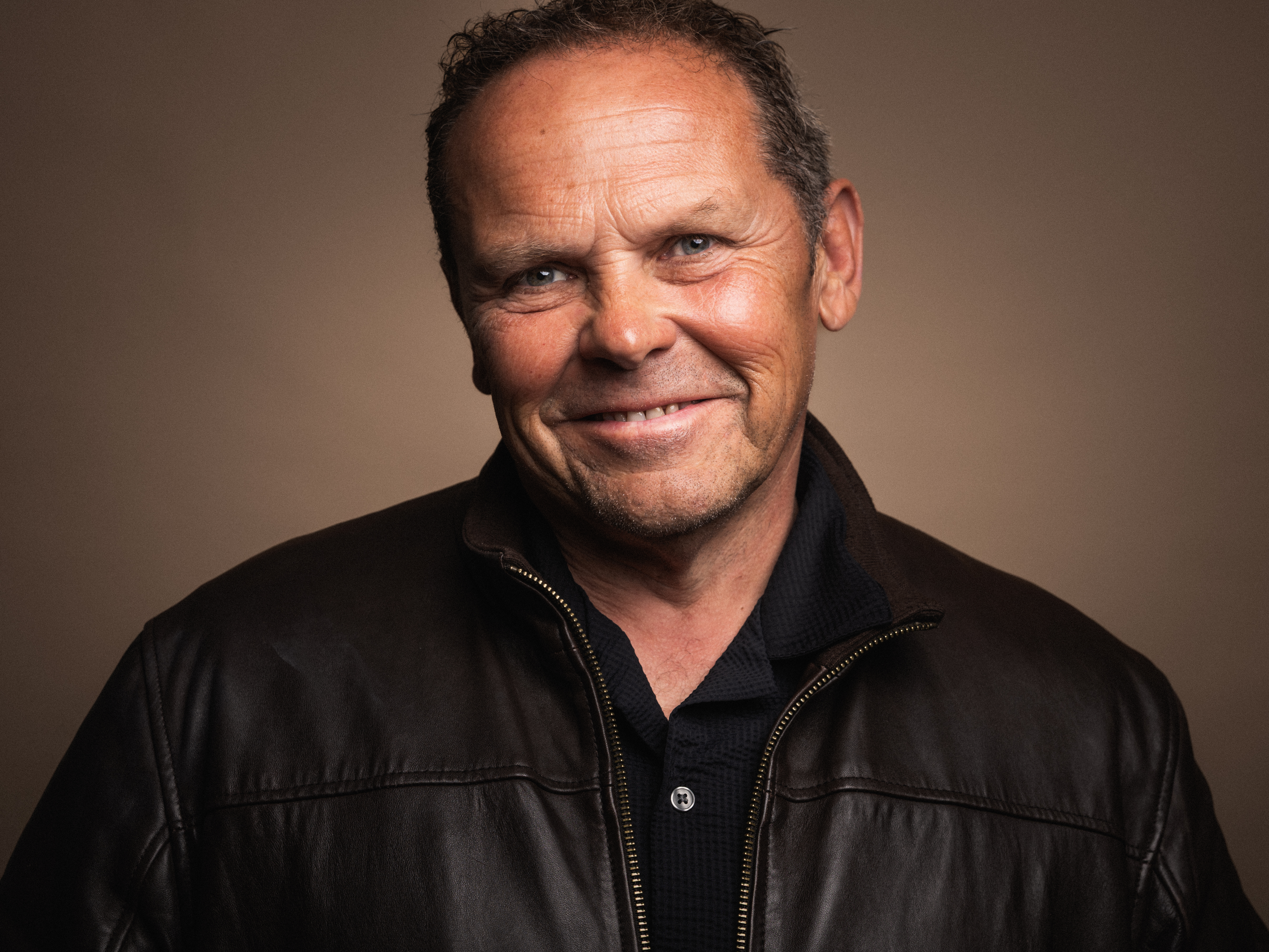

Kevin Chapman is an American actor known for playing an assortment of characters ranging from the obnoxious brother Terrence Garrity in FX's Rescue Me to street enforcer Val Savage in Clint Eastwood's Mystic River. He also guest starred in 24 (2002–2003), played Freddie Cork on Brotherhood (2006–2008), appeared in the film Sunshine Cleaning (2008), and portrayed Detective Lionel Fusco on the CBS crime drama Person of Interest (2011–2016).

== Career ==
Prior to acting, he had worked as a doorman and a stand-up comedian. While working at the Boston Office of Cultural Affairs, Chapman was discovered by the director Ted Demme and was cast as Mickey Pat in Monument Ave. (1998). Other notable film roles of his include The Cider House Rules, Mystic River, 21 Grams, In Good Company, an Italian mobster in The Boondock Saints (1999), and Fire Lt. Frank McKinney in Ladder 49 (2004). Chapman starred as Irish Mob boss, Freddie Cork, for three seasons in the Showtime original series Brotherhood. Chapman played a first responder assisting Jack Bauer (Kiefer Sutherland) in season 1 episode 24 of the TV series 24 (2001) and Kevin Mitchell in season 3 of 24 (2003). He also played a CIA operative (O'Leary) in the independent comedy Black Dynamite.

In 2006, Chapman appeared as an officer in the episode "Lessons Learned" (Season 2, Episode 10) of Criminal Minds. In 2010, he played Bunny in Tony Scott's action film Unstoppable. He also was a guest star in the series Lost. He appears in the film Bad Country (2013), directed by Chris Brinker. From 2011 to 2016, he portrayed Detective Lionel Fusco on the CBS show Person of Interest. He had a small role, as a struggling alcoholic, in Equalizer 2 (2018) but was mysteriously credited as Gerry Pucci.

== Filmography ==
=== Film ===
Key
†	Denotes films that have not yet been released

Year	Title	Role	Notes
1998	Monument Ave.	Mickey Pat	
1999	The Boondock Saints	"Chappy"	
1999	In Too Deep	O'Hanlon	
1999	The Cider House Rules	Adopting Dad	Uncredited
1999	Sporting Dog	Mr. James	Short film
2001	In the Bedroom	Tim's Friend	
2001	Blow	DEA Eastham	
2001	What's the Worst That Could Happen?	The Bartender	
2001	abracadabra	Unknown	
2003	Mystic River	Val Savage	
2003	21 Grams	Alan	
2004	Irish Eyes	Hopper	
2004	Ladder 49	Frank McKinny	
2004	In Good Company	Lou	
2005	The Fix	Cyrus	Short film
2005	Long Distance	Joe	
2005	Two for the Money	"Southie"	
2006	Hard Luck	Franklin	
2006	Unknown	Detective McGahey	
2007	Black Irish	Officer Pierce	
2008	Sunshine Cleaning	Carl Swanson	
2009	Lonely Street	Cowboy Cop	
2009	Black Dynamite	O'Leary	
2010	Unstoppable	"Bunny"	
2010	Inside Out	John McGinley	Short film
2011	Street Kings 2: Motor City	Detective Jimmy Rogan	
2011	Assassination Games	Culley	
2014	Bad Country	Daniel Morris	
2015	Exeter	Greer	
2016	Stevie D	Lenny	
2016	Good Kids	Principal Brinkley	
2018	The Equalizer 2	Taxi Passenger	
2018	Slender Man	Mr. Jensen	
2018	Saint Judy	Officer King	
2018	City of Lies	Sergeant Leeds	
2021	CODA	Brady	
2023	Outlaw Johnny Black	U.S. Marshal Cove	
2024	Aftermath	Inspector Grimes	
TBA	Wekiwa †	Walter	Filming

=== Television ===
Year	Title	Role	Notes
1998	Vig	Dave	TV movie
2001	Private Lies	Unknown	TV movie
2001	The Practice	Officer LeMay	Episode: "Home of the Brave"
2002	The Agency	Unknown	Episode: "Finale"
2002–2003	24	Warden Kevin Mitchell / Coast Guard Officer	3 episodes
2003	CSI: Crime Scene Investigation	The Bartender	Episode: "Random Acts of Violence"
2003	NYPD Blue	Brad Riggs	Episode: "Frickin’ Fraker"
2004	Touching Evil	Daniel "D.J." James	Episode: "Boston"
2005	Joan of Arcadia	Jim Lane	Episode: "Independence Day"
2005	Boston Legal	Officer Wayne Kirkland	Episode: "Tortured Souls"
2006	Criminal Minds	FBI Agent Andy Bingaman	Episode: "Lessons Learned"
2006–2008	Brotherhood	Freddie Cork	Main role
2008	Sons of Anarchy	Michael McKeavey	Episode: "Fun Town"
2009	Lost	Mitch	2 episodes
2009	Rescue Me	Terrence Garrity	Recurring role
2009	Leverage	Brandon O'Hare	Episode: "The Beantown Bailout Job"
2009–2010	Cold Case	Joe Mueller	2 episodes
2010	Hawthorne	Ben Adams	2 episodes
2010	Madso's War	Gerry Walker	TV movie
2011	The Whole Truth	Billy Brogan	Episode: "Perfect Witness"
2011	Rizzoli & Isles	Chief Merck	Episode: "Don't Hate the Player"
2011–2016	Person of Interest	Detective Lionel Fusco	Main role
2015	Survivor's Remorse	Joe Connelly	Episode: "Homebound"
2015	Last Week Tonight with John Oliver	Cop	Segment: "Public Defenders in the United States"
2017	Sneaky Pete	Bo Lockley	3 episodes
2017	APB	Captain Raymond Hauser	Episode: "Hard Reset"
2019	Blue Bloods	Art Buckner	Episode: "Disrupted"
2019	The Punisher	Kusack	2 episodes
2019	City on a Hill	Detective J.R. "Dickie" Minogue	Recurring role
2021	The Equalizer	Zev Petrus	Episode: "The Room Where It Happens"
2021	Kevin Can F**k Himself	Detective Bob Bram	3 episodes
2022	Billions	Tony Plimpton	Episode: "Hostis Humani Generis"
2022	NCIS	Billy Doyle	Episode: "Thick as Thieves"
2022	Evil	Manager Demon (voice)	Episode: "The Angel of Warning"; uncredited
2024	FBI: Most Wanted	Coach	Episode:"Fouled Out"
2024	Chicago Fire	Ron	Episode: "Down the Rabbit Hole"
2025	Bookie	Mickey	2 episodes
2025	Boston Blue	Fire Chief Terry Morgan	Episode: "In the name of the Father, and of..."
