= Moscow Chill =

2007 film directed by Chris Solimine

- Directed by: Chris Solimine
- Screenplay by: Andrey Konchalovskiy; Chris Solimine
- Starring: Norman Reedus; Konstantin Yushkevich; Slava Schoot
- Cinematography: Sergei Kozlov
- Edited by: Henry Richardson
- Production companies: Production Center of Andrei Konchalovsky; Park Cinema Production; Rospofilm
- Distributed by: Nashe Kino
- Release date: December 7, 2007
- Running time: 92 minutes
- Country: Russia
- Languages: English; Russian
- Budget: $1 million (estimated)

Moscow Chill (Russian: Мороз по коже, romanized: Moroz po kozhe) is a 2007 Russian thriller film co-written and directed by Chris Solimine.

== Plot ==
American computer hacker Ray Perso is brought to Russia. His client is a Russian oligarch sitting in jail. He orders him to track down and steal the money that is hidden in the "International Bank Transfer System". Unexpectedly, Ray falls in love with a girl named Maya. Having successfully breached the system Ray realizes that he has become a pawn in someone else's game, and now the fate of people Perso cares about hangs solely upon him.

== Cast ==
- Norman Reedus as Ray Perso
- Konstantin Yushkevich as Vasya
- Slava Schoot as Dolphin
- Kseniya Buravskaya as Maya
- Alexander Lenkov as Mitya
- Aleksandr Yakovlev as Ivan
- Valery Marionov as Eel
- Yuriy Dumchev as Carp
- Vladimir Kuleshov as Dubinsky
