= The Boondock Saints II: All Saints Day =

2009 film by Troy Duffy

- Theatrical release poster
- Directed by: Troy Duffy
- Screenplay by: Troy Duffy
- Story by: Troy Duffy; Taylor Duffy
- Produced by: Chris Brinker; Don Carmody
- Starring: Sean Patrick Flanery; Norman Reedus; Clifton Collins Jr.; Julie Benz; Judd Nelson; Bob Marley; Brian Mahoney; David Ferry; David Della Rocco; Peter Fonda; Billy Connolly
- Cinematography: Miroslaw Baszak
- Edited by: Bill DeRonde; Paul Kumpata
- Music by: Jeff Danna
- Production companies: Stage 6 Films; Don Carmody Productions
- Distributed by: Apparition
- Release dates: October 19, 2009 (Boston); December 11, 2009 (United States)
- Running time: 117 minutes
- Countries: United States; Canada
- Language: English
- Budget: $8 million
- Box office: $10.6 million

The Boondock Saints II: All Saints Day is a 2009 action thriller film written and directed by Troy Duffy, based on a story he co-wrote with his brother Taylor. A sequel to The Boondock Saints (1999), the film stars Sean Patrick Flanery, Norman Reedus, Clifton Collins Jr., Julie Benz, Peter Fonda, and Billy Connolly. Set eight years after the events of the first film, it follows Irish fraternal twin brothers Connor and Murphy MacManus (Flanery and Reedus) living a quiet life in Ireland with their father Noah, formerly known as "Il Duce" (Connolly). However, when an assassin frames the twins for the murder of a Catholic priest, they return to Boston and join forces with Mexican underground fighter Romeo (Collins, Jr.) and FBI Special Agent Eunice Bloom (Benz), a former protégée of Paul Smecker.

The Boondock Saints II: All Saints Day had its world premiere in Boston on October 19, 2009, and was theatrically released in the United States on December 11, 2009. Despite negative reviews from critics, the film was a modest success at the box office, grossing $10.6 million against its $8 million budget.

== Plot ==
On St. Patrick's Day, a renowned Boston priest is ritually murdered. Father Sibeal arrives in Ireland to inform his nephews the MacManus twins, Connor and Murphy, that someone has copied the style of execution they used eight years earlier to kill Mafia boss Joe Yakavetta. The twins and their father, Noah, realize that someone is trying to implicate them in the priest's killing. In response, the Saints dig up their old gear and weapons and depart for the United States, but Noah stays behind.

En route to Boston aboard a container ship, the twins meet Romeo, a Mexican underground fighter who recognizes them as the Saints. Romeo convinces them to let him join them as their new partner. Hearing a radio broadcast regarding Joe's son, Concezio Yakavetta, they deduce that he must have hired the hitman who killed the priest to draw them out of hiding.

Meanwhile, Boston Detectives Greenly, Dolly, and Duffy are at the scene of the priest's murder. Also there is FBI Special Agent Eunice Bloom, a no-nonsense protégée of the late Paul Smecker, who has been assigned to determine whether or not the Saints are responsible for the murder. Bloom eventually concludes that the Saints did not murder the priest, and begins an investigation to find the real assassin. She and the detectives deduce the killer is Ottilio Panza, working for someone known only as "The Old Man".

Connor, Murphy, and Romeo hit a warehouse that is being used by a Chinese Triad gang to process heroin for Yakavetta. After clumsily killing everyone at the warehouse, the trio hides out with the MacManus' old bartender friend, Doc. They learn that the assassin was an independent contractor and that Yakavetta himself is hiding in the Prudential Tower. Later at the warehouse, Bloom confirms that the Saints have returned.

The twins and Romeo have Yakavetta's caporegime "Gorgeous George" set up a meeting with a group of mobsters at a bar, where they kill them all except George, who is allowed to escape. Panza arrives shortly after and attempts to ambush the twins, but Bloom arrives in time to save them by wounding Panza, who then flees. Bloom introduces herself to the Saints, revealing that she had intended to help them all along in Smecker's place. The group then cleans up the crime scene to make it look as if the mobsters had turned on each other. Later, Bloom reunites the detectives with the Saints, thus bringing them in on their plans.

Yakavetta calls a meeting with his crew, during which the Saints arrive and kill everyone, including Yakavetta. Bloom interrogates Yakavetta's consigliere Jimmy and learns of the Old Man's involvement with Panza. FBI Special Agent Kuntsler takes over the gang murder case, suspending Bloom. Later at the bar, Greenly arrives to celebrate the boys' victory, but is shot and killed by Panza. Noah, earlier having decided to help his sons, unexpectedly arrives to demand Panza tell him the Old Man's location. They engage in a "Russian roulette" stand-off, and after Panza still refuses to answer, Noah kills him.

Noah relates to the group that in 1958 New York, he watched a trio of mobsters brutally murder his father. Aided by his best friend Louie, Noah later hunted down and killed the mobsters. Noah still felt unsatisfied, so Louie reluctantly helped him pick out other mobsters to kill, which is how Noah became "Il Duce". They continued this until 1975, when Louie finally gave Noah up to the police.

Bloom illegally obtains a file regarding Louie's location and gives it to Noah, which reveals that Louie is The Old Man. Anticipating the Saints' arrival at his mansion, Louie has hit men stationed on the grounds. Confronted by Noah, Louie admits that he had deliberately used Noah to eliminate his competition in the Mafia, afterwards giving him up to the police when he was no longer useful. After this, however, the Mafia cast Louie himself out for the same reason. He then helped rebuild the Yakavetta family after Joe's demise and let the Saints take out the rest of the organization so Louie could take control. Louie signals the hit men waiting for the Saints to make their move, but the Saints and Romeo kill them all. Noah suffers a fatal gunshot wound, but kills Louie before he dies. The police arrive and Connor, Murphy, and a seriously injured Romeo are taken to a prison hospital.

Bloom meets with Sibeal, who has arranged to take her to a safe place out of the country to flee FBI prosecution. She discovers that Sibeal has been working with Smecker, who faked his own death and developed a network of support for the Saints and their work. Smecker tells Bloom he plans to break the Saints out of prison. As supporters outside of the prison protest for the release of the Saints, Connor and Murphy see the sea of prisoners in the yard, finding that they will have plenty of work while they wait to be freed.

== Cast ==
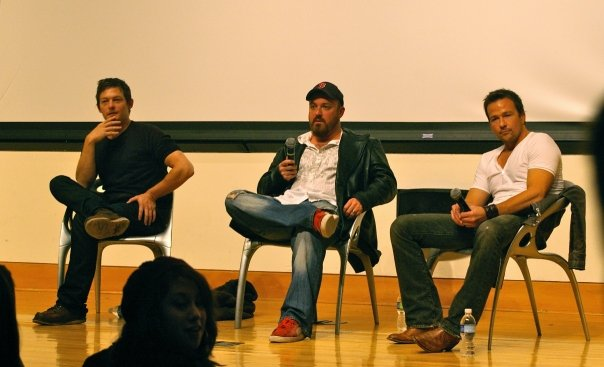
Norman Reedus (left), Troy Duffy (center), and Sean Patrick Flanery (right) promoting the film at Drexel University in Philadelphia

- Sean Patrick Flanery as Connor MacManus, one-half of the MacManus twins. In addition to the "Veritas" tattoo on his left hand, he now has a tattoo of Christ's upper torso and face on his back.
- Norman Reedus as Murphy MacManus, the other half of the MacManus twins. In addition to the "Aequitas" tattoo on his right hand, he now has a tattoo of Christ's nailed feet on his back.
- Clifton Collins Jr. as Romeo, a Mexican fighter who becomes the twins' new sidekick.
- Billy Connolly as Noah "Il Duce" MacManus, the father of the MacManus twins.
  - Matt Lemche as Young Noah MacManus
- Julie Benz as FBI Special Agent Eunice Bloom, the agent assigned to the gang murders connected to the Saints. She is a former apprentice of Paul Smecker.
- Willem Dafoe as FBI Special Agent Paul Smecker (Uncredited Cameo), an ally of the MacManus twins in the first film. He fakes his own death and reveals at the end that he has started an agency funded by the Catholic Church that will help the Saints escape from jail and continue their work as vigilantes.
- Judd Nelson as Concezio "Little Yaka" Yakavetta, the son of Don 'Papa' Joe Yakavetta, who was executed by the Saints in court eight years ago. He hires a hitman to execute a priest to call out the Saints.
- Bob Marley as Detective David Greenly, a detective partnered with 'Dolly' and Duffy.
- David Ferry as Detective "Dolly" Alapopskalius, a detective partnered with Duffy and Greenly.
- Brian Mahoney as Detective Duffy, a detective partnered with 'Dolly' and Greenly.
- Peter Fonda as Louie "The Roman" Romano, Noah's former friend, who had him sent to prison in 1975.
  - Robert Mauriell as Young Louie Romano
- Daniel DeSanto as Ottilio "The Little Man" Panza, a hitman of short stature hired by Yakavetta to kill a priest.
- David Della Rocco as David "The Funny Man" Della Rocco, the twins' former sidekick, who was killed by Joe Yakavetta in the first film. He appears in flashbacks and dream sequences.
- Paul Johansson as FBI Special Agent Bill Kuntsler, the agent who suspends Special Agent Bloom and takes over the gang murder case.
- Gerard Parkes as "Doc" McGinty, the owner of an Irish pub and a friend of the twins. He has a stutter and Tourette syndrome.
- Bob Rubin as George "Gorgeous George", Yakavetta's underboss from Brooklyn. He is forced by Special Agent Bloom and the twins to give information on the Yakavetta clan.
- Mairtin O'Carrigan as Father Sibeal MacManus, the cousin of Noah MacManus.
- Louis Di Bianco as Patronazzi, an old mobster and friend of Louie's.
- Aaron Berg as Joe "Jo-Jo" Rhama, one Yakavetta's top lieutenants.
- Richard Fitzpatrick as The Chief, Chief of the Boston Police Department.
- Tig Fong as Asian Gangster, leader of the Chinese Triads who is smuggling drugs for Yakavetta.
- Pedro Salvin as Uncle Cesar, Romeo's uncle and an alley of the Saints.
- Sweeney MacArthur as Jacob MacManus, Noah's father who was killed by mobsters in the 1950s.
- Dwayne McLean as Father Douglas McKinney, a priest who was killed in attempt to frame the Saints.
- Robb Wells as Jimmy "The Gofer" Green, Concezio Yakavetta's consigliere

== Production ==
After years in development hell, the success of the first film's theatrical rerelease spurred 20th Century Fox to finance a sequel. In March 2008, Troy Duffy confirmed that the film was greenlit. Pre-production on the film started in early September 2008. Principal photography took place in Ontario from October 20, 2008 to December 10, 2008.

Duffy kept a video diary of the film's progress on YouTube, with some of the shooting sequences, and "question and answer" segments from fans answered by the film's stars.

== Marketing and release ==
The film's first trailer was officially released online on September 2, 2009, via IGN. The film was initially released in 67 theaters in the Northeastern and Western areas of the continental US, and was gradually released into more theaters in the following weeks.

=== Critical reception ===
On Rotten Tomatoes, the film received a 23% approval rating based on 44 reviews, with a weighted average of 4.12/10. The site's consensus reads: "This sequel to the cult favorite The Boondock Saints is more of the same -- unoriginal, absurd, violent, over-the-top, and occasionally mean-spirited". Metacritic, which uses a weighted average, assigned a score of 24 out of 100 based on 16 critics, indicating "generally unfavorable reviews".

Roger Ebert praised the film's "superb" cinematography, but felt it was wasted on an "idiotic ode to macho horseshite," and gave the film one star out of four.

== Home media ==
On March 9, 2010 the film was released on single disc DVD and 2-Disc Steelbook Special Edition DVD, as well as Blu-ray with special features including deleted scenes, audio commentary, and a behind the scenes featurette.

== Soundtrack ==
The Boondock Saints II: All Saints Day (Music from the Motion Picture)

Soundtrack album by Jeff Danna and various artists
- Released: April 7, 2010
- Genres: Film score; hard rock; alternative rock
- Length: 61:00
- Labels: Boondock Saints, LLC.

The soundtrack became available for preorder in late March on the official Boondock Saints Store website and became available for purchase and digital download at other retailers April 7, 2010.

All tracks are written by Jeff Danna, except where noted.

No.	Title	Writer(s)	Artist(s)	Length
1.	"Ireland Intro"			0:42
2.	"Line of Blood"	Ty Stone	Ty Stone	3:49
3.	"B.O.S.M."	The Dirges	The Dirges	2:08
4.	"Plastic Jesus"	Taylor Duffy	Taylor Duffy	4:27
5.	"Eclipse"	Radiant-X	Radiant-X	0:57
6.	"Balls Deep"	Sean Cane	Sean C	3:42
7.	"Better Days"	The Dirges	The Dirges	4:05
8.	"Requiem Massive"	Radiant-X	Radiant-X	2:02
9.	"Real Thang"	Sam Wood; Ty Stone	Ty Stone	3:10
10.	"Holiday"	The Dirges	The Dirges	3:03
11.	"The Wreckoning"	Radiant-X	Radiant-X	2:14
12.	"Holy Fool"	Troy Duffy	The Boondock Saints	4:16
13.	"The Saints Are Coming" (Skids cover)	Richard Jobson; Stuart Adamson	The Dirges	2:51
14.	"Saints from the Streets"			2:56
15.	"Crew Cut vs. Poppa M"			1:48
16.	"Young Noah"			1:55
17.	"Ireland"			2:22
18.	"Noah's Vendetta"			1:36
19.	"Fake-bake Shake"			1:40
20.	"Skyscraper Assault"			3:02
21.	"The Last Gun Battle"			1:55
22.	"Get Them Out"			2:04
23.	"Blood Of Cu Chulainn 2010"	J. Danna; Mychael Danna	Jeff Danna & Mychael Danna	4:06
Total length:				61:00

== Books ==
A six-issue comic book series, made up of three two-issue chapters written by Troy Duffy and published by 12 Gauge Comics, was released in May 2010 as a companion to the film. The story is a more in-depth version of Il Duce's backstory together with the story of a hit the twin brothers performed that does not appear in the film.

There was also a mini-book available from the official Boondock Saints website which told a story that took place prior to the strip club scene from the first film. Both will eventually be released in a single graphic novel.

== Sequel ==
Director Troy Duffy spoke about a potential sequel in an interview on June 13, 2011. He said that "We’ve been approached to do a possible Boondock Saints TV series. So the fans may be getting a part 3 as a television show. We might be able to pull that off….I actually called both Sean and Norman and they both said “hell yeah, we’ll drop everything.” On March 21, 2012 it was indicated by Sean Patrick Flanery and Norman Reedus that Boondock Saints 3 is being written, tentatively titled "The Boondock Saints III: Saints Preserve Us." On September 14, 2012 Norman Reedus stated that there would be no third film.

Again, on February 26, 2013, Troy Duffy stated that he was getting together with Norman Reedus and Sean Patrick Flanery to resume talks about Boondock Saints 3, in hopes that they could make the film a reality for fans. Later in 2013 at the Calgary Comic & Entertainment Expo, Sean Patrick Flanery confirmed that The Boondock Saints 3 is being worked on by Troy Duffy by saying "After the recent tragedies hit Boston I texted (director) Troy Duffy to ask him about when he would work on the third one and he replied ‘on it’". On July 16, 2013, Troy Duffy stated in an interview with CraveOnline that he was halfway finished with the script for The Boondock Saints III.

On May 6, 2017, Sean Patrick Flannery announced on Twitter that he and Norman Reedus had walked away from production of Boondock Saints III with no further explanation, leading the future of the series in doubt.

In November 2021, a third Boondock Saints film was officially announced, with Reedus and Flanery reprising their roles as Connor and Murphy MacManus and Duffy returning to direct. Production was slated to begin in May 2022.

In March 2024, a "reimagining" of the franchise was officially announced, with Thunder Road Films joining Impossible Dream Entertainment and rights holder Dragonfly Films as a production company on the film. Reedus and Flanery will reprise their roles and serve as executive producers, although Duffy, who plans to continue the story through a series of books, will not return as director.
