= George Cheung =

Hong Kong-American actor and stuntman (born 1949)

- Born: February 8, 1949 (age 77); Hong Kong
- Other names: George Kee Cheung; Cheung Joh-chi
- Occupations: Actor; stuntman
- Years active: 1975–present

Chinese name
- Traditional Chinese: 張佐治
- Simplified Chinese: 张佐治
Transcriptions
Standard Mandarin
- Hanyu Pinyin: Zhāng Zuǒzhì
Yue: Cantonese
- Jyutping: Zoeng^{1} Zo^{3}Zi^{6}

George Kee Cheung (Chinese: 張佐治; Jyutping: Zoeng^{1} Zo^{3}Zi^{6}; born February 8, 1949) is a Hong Kong-American actor and stunt performer. He has appeared in over 200 film and television roles since 1975, typically as supporting villains and henchmen.

== Early life ==
Cheung was born and raised in Hong Kong, and practiced martial arts as a child. He moved to the United States to study at the University of San Francisco, where he earned a degree in biology.

== Career ==
Cheung began his acting career in 1975, appearing in a number of San Francisco-based productions like the TV series The Streets of San Francisco and the Sam Peckinpah film The Killer Elite, and performing stunts for the Dirty Harry film The Enforcer.

Some notable television programs he has guest starred on include M*A*S*H; Fantasy Island; Hart to Hart; MacGyver; Magnum, P.I.; Simon & Simon; Kung Fu: The Legend Continues; The A-Team; Knight Rider; How I Met Your Mother; Seinfeld; Thunder in Paradise; Martial Law; Walker, Texas Ranger; Nash Bridges; NYPD Blue; ER; The West Wing; Seibu Keisatsu; Lost and The Haves and the Have Nots.

His film appearances include Under Siege, Rambo: First Blood Part II, RoboCop 2, Fist of the North Star, Lethal Weapon 4, Rush Hour, Starsky & Hutch and Mongolian Death Worm. In 2013, he voiced Wei Cheng in Grand Theft Auto V.

== Honors ==
In May 2008, Cheung was presented by California's Asian Pacific Islander Legislative Caucus with the Asian Pacific Islander Heritage Award for Excellence in Arts and Entertainment.

== Filmography ==
=== Film ===
- The Killer Elite (1975) as Bruce
- The Enforcer (1976) as Mendez Henchman (uncredited)
- The Kentucky Fried Movie (1977) as Guard No. 1 (segment "A Fistful of Yen")
- The Amsterdam Kill (1977) as Jimmy Wong
- Invisible Strangler (1978) as Medical Examiner Jim
- Spider-Man: The Dragon's Challenge (1979, TV Movie) as Doctor Pai
- The Exterminator (1980) as Viet Cong Commander
- The Beach Girls (1982) as Wang
- Going Berserk (1983) as Kung Fu Fighter
- Rambo: First Blood Part II (1985) as Lieutenant Tay
- Big Trouble in Little China (1986) as Chang Sing No. 6
- Opposing Force (1986) as Tuan
- The Night Stalker (1986) as Thug (uncredited)
- Steele Justice (1987) as Mob Thug No. 3 (uncredited)
- Weekend at Bernie's (1989) as Lomax's Gardener
- Another 48 Hrs. (1990) as Hotel Guest
- RoboCop 2 (1990) as Gilette
- Guns (1990) as Sifu
- The Hard Way (1991) as Drug Dealer
- One Good Cop (1991) as Waiter
- Fury in Red (1991) as George Chang
- Showdown in Little Tokyo (1991) as Yoshida's Men (uncredited)
- Ricochet (1991) as Huey, Drug Dealer (uncredited)
- The Master (1992) as Paul
- Death Ring (1992) as Mr. Chen
- Storyville (1992) as Xang Tran
- Sneakers (1992) as Chinese Restaurant Singer
- Glengarry Glen Ross (1992) (voice)
- Wishman (1992) as Servant No. 1
- Under Siege (1992) as Commando
- Cooperstown (1993, TV Movie) as Mr. Matsunaga
- Joshua Tree (1993) as Chinese Gunmen No. 4
- Shootfighter: Fight to the Death (1993) as Master
- New York Cop (1993) as Tong
- North (1994) as Chinese Barber
- Deadly Target (1994) as Man No. 2
- Fist of the North Star (1995) as Neville
- Batman Forever (1995) as Guest (uncredited)
- Galaxis (1995) as Eddie
- The Adventurers (1995) as Uncle Tung
- Police Story 4: First Strike (1996) as Chinese Group No. 1
- White Tiger (1996) as Detective Fong
- Carjack (1996) as Chang
- True Vengeance (1997) as Hideko Minushoto
- Brotherhood (1997) as Nick
- High Voltage (1997) as Victor Phan
- Lethal Weapon 4 (1998) as Fan
- Rush Hour (1998) as Soo Yung's Driver
- The Yakuza Way (1998) as Mike Sakata
- Austin Powers: The Spy Who Shagged Me (1999) as Chinese Teacher
- No Tomorrow (1999) as Ming
- Ultimate Target (2000) as Raymond Fischer
- Assassina – Codinome: Ghost (2001)
- The Silent Force (2001) as Hue Gung Pao
- U.S. Seals II: The Ultimate Force (2001, Direct-to-video) as Sensei Matsumura
- Invincible (2001, TV Movie) as Tojo Sakamura
- We Were Soldiers (2002) as NVA Officer (uncredited)
- Wicked Game (2002) as Christopher
- Starsky & Hutch (2004) as Chau
- Sucker Free City (2004, TV Movie) as Mr. Tsing
- American Fusion (2005) as Albert
- 18 Fingers of Death! (2006) as Dr. Fook Yu
- Mission: Impossible III (2006) as Shanghai Game Player (uncredited)
- The Pursuit of Happyness (2006) as Chinese Maintenance Worker
- Rush Hour 3 (2007) as Reynard Triad Gangster (uncredited)
- Blizhniy Boy: The Ultimate Fighter (2007) as Detective Ishanov
- The Perfect Host (2010) as Storekeeper
- Invincible Scripture (2010) as Tao Ling
- Mongolian Death Worm (2010, TV Movie) as Timor
- Anita Ho (2014) as Mr. Lee
- Awesome Asian Bad Guys (2014) as George
- Beyond the Game (2016) as Police Captain

=== Television ===
- The Bionic Woman (1978) as 2nd Agent (Episode: "Rancho Outcast")
- Wonder Woman (1979) as Mr. Munn (Episode: "Spaced Out")
- M*A*S*H (1979) as Korean Soldier (Episode: "Guerilla my Dreams")
- Magnum, P.I. (1980) as Choi (Episode: "China Doll")
- Manimal (1983) as Dragon the sifu (Episode: "Breath of the dragon")
- T. J. Hooker (1983–1984) as Po and Dr. Coe (2 episodes)
- Mickey Spillane's Mike Hammer (1984) as Chinese Triad member (Episode: "Hot Ice")
- MacGyver (1985–1992) as General Narai (Episode 1.2 "The Golden Triangle")/ Troy / Dr Liang (3 episodes)
- Knight Rider (1986) as Suki Taneka (Episode: "Knight Of The Rising Sun")
- Saved by the Bell: The College Years (1993) as Chinese Professor (Episode: "Guess Who's Coming to College?")
- Kung Fu: The Legend Continues (1993) as Chang Lu Ma (Episode: "Illusion")
- Thunder in Paradise (1994) as Da Ri (Episode: "Nature of the Beast")
- Walker Texas Ranger (1994) as Manzo Tokada (Episode: "Tiger's Eye")
- Murder She Wrote (1996) as Ikuma Nakata (Episode: "Kendo Killing")
- Seinfeld (1997) as Owner (Episode: "The Pothole")
- Sunset Beach (1997) as Mr. Chang (7 episodes)
- Mortal Kombat Conquest (1999) as Master Cho (Episode: "The Master")
- ER (2003) as Mr. Chen
- Days of Our Lives (2004) as Hanzo Hattori (2 episodes)
- The West Wing (2004–2006) as China Ambassador Ling-Po (2 episodes)
- How I Met Your Mother (2006) as Korean Elvis (Episode: "Nothing Good Happens After 2 A.M.")
- Lost (2008) as Ambassador (Episode: "Ji Yeon")
- House M.D (2012) as Xang (Episode: "Body and Soul")
- Hawaii Five-0 (2016) as Yao Fat (2 episodes)
- BMF (2024) as Han Jin (3 episodes)

=== Videogames ===
- Soldier of Fortune II: Double Helix (2002) as Huang Zhenmeng
- Halo 2 (2004) as ILB: Mr. Shebura (Uncredited)
- Mercenaries: Playground of Destruction (2005) as Captain Kai Leu, China Soldier
- The Matrix: Path of Neo (2005) as Kung Fu Soldier, Chinatown Gangster, Additional Walla
- Pirates of the Caribbean: At World's End (2007) as Sao Feng's Henchman
- Enemy Territory: Quake Wars (2007) as GDF Covert Ops, Additional VO
- Uncharted: Drake's Fortune (2007) as Pirates No. 1
- Dead to Rights: Retribution (2010) as Lao
- Grand Theft Auto V (2013) as Wei Cheng, The Local Population
- Uncharted: The Nathan Drake Collection (2015) as Pirates (Archive Footage)
