= Gerard Parkes =

Irish-Canadian actor (1924–2014)

- Born: October 16, 1924; Dublin, Ireland
- Died: October 19, 2014 (aged 90); Toronto, Ontario, Canada
- Other names: Gerry Parkes
- Occupation: Actor
- Years active: 1959–2009
- Spouse: Sheelagh Norman (m. 1980s)

Gerard Parkes (October 16, 1924 – October 19, 2014) was an Irish-Canadian actor. He was born in Dublin and moved to Toronto in 1956. Parkes is known for playing Doc on the Canadian Broadcasting Corporation television series Fraggle Rock and the bartender in the film The Boondock Saints and its sequel The Boondock Saints II: All Saints Day.

== Career ==
Parkes' acting career spanned film, radio, television, and the stage. He worked often on CBC radio, beginning in 1959, and shifted into television and film, acting in such diverse series as the 1960s' ecological adventure series The Forest Rangers, family show The Littlest Hobo (both series), and the detective series Cagney and Lacey.

In 1968, Parkes won the first Canadian film award (then called the Etrog and now known as the Gemini) for his portrayal of Uncle Matthew in the movie Isabel. Parkes received the Andrew Allan Award in 1983 for Best Radio Actor, and in 1999, he won the Dora Mavor Moore Award for Outstanding Performance in a Featured Role for Kilt. Parkes played Wiff Roach in Mike Newell's 1976 television adaptation of David French's theatrical play Of the Fields, Lately.

Parkes played "Doc" in the North American version of Fraggle Rock. When he was cast in Fraggle Rock, Parkes was finishing a regular role as another type of "doc," playing Dr. Arthur Lowe (no relation to the English actor of the same name) on the Canadian TV series Home Fires. After Fraggle Rock, in addition to returning as Doc in A Muppet Family Christmas, he continued to work in children's television, guest starring as alcoholic photographer Phil (opposite Sesame Park puppeteer Nina Keogh) on the TVOntario puppet series Today's Special, and appearing regularly on PBS's Shining Time Station as store owner Barton Winslow.

In 1988, Parkes made a cameo appearance in the hit comedy Short Circuit 2 as a priest, and he appeared in The Last Winter as the protagonist's grandfather the following year. In 1995, Parkes also portrayed the priest at St Bart's in New York in the Olsen Twins movie It Takes Two.

In 1996, Parkes portrayed Jonathan Swift in the HBO Original Film Handel's Last Chance. Two years later, he appeared on an episode of PBS's Noddy, as Wally the Wanderer in "Noah's Leaving". Parkes appeared with Willem Dafoe and Billy Connolly in The Boondock Saints (playing a Tourette's syndrome-afflicted bartender, also named "Doc"). He reprised the role for The Boondock Saints II: All Saints Day.

Parkes appeared in The Adjuster (1991), premiering at the New York Film Festival. In 1991, it won the Special Silver St. George at the 17th Moscow International Film Festival.

== Death ==
Parkes died on October 19, 2014, in Toronto, Ontario, three days after his 90th birthday.

== Honors and awards ==
- In 1968, Canadian Film Award for Best Actor.
- In 1999, Dora Mavor Moore Award for Outstanding Performance in a Featured Role for Kilt.

== Sources ==
- Greer, Sandy. "Small Screen", The Toronto Star, August 2, 1986
