= Mongolian Death Worm (film) =

2010 American television film by Steven R. Monroe

- DVD Cover
- Genre: Action; Horror; Science fiction
- Screenplay by: Neil Elman; Kevin Leeson; Steven R. Monroe
- Directed by: Steven R. Monroe
- Starring: Victoria Pratt; Sean Patrick Flanery; George Cheung; Drew Waters
- Music by: Emir Isilay; Pinar Toprak
- Country of origin: United States
- Original language: English

Production
- Executive producers: Paul Hertzberg; Lisa M. Hansen; Steven R. Monroe; Nathan Ross
- Producer: Andrew Stevens
- Cinematography: Neil Lisk
- Editor: Kristina Hamilton-Grobler
- Running time: 90 minutes
- Production companies: CineTel Films; Andrew Stevens Entertainment; RHI Entertainment

Original release
- Network: Syfy
- Release: May 8, 2010

Mongolian Death Worm is a 2010 television film directed by Steven R. Monroe and stars Sean Patrick Flanery that was aired on May 8, 2010 on Syfy.

== Plot ==
A shale oil extracting operation funded by an American corporation in Mongolia is interrupted by mysterious mechanical failures, worrying Patrick, the on-site manager. The drilling operations have disturbed a nest of creatures known in indigenous legends as Mongolian death worms. They are enormous underground creatures with vicious teeth, poisonous venom, and the ability to generate an electromagnetic field that interferes with electronics. After one of the workers is killed, the others stop showing up for work, frightened by the rumors. Patrick starts to panic when his boss, Mr. Bixler, arrives from America.

In Sepegal village, a group of volunteer medical workers, Doctors of Hope, attempts to stop a disease outbreak. Elsewhere, lead doctor Alicia and her colleague Phillip hire treasure hunter Daniel to take them and medical supplies to Sepegal.

Daniel is well aware of the legends of the worms and has found artifacts engraved with their images. He believes they are clue to Genghis Khan's tomb. His activities has earned the ire of local crime boss Kowlan. On the way, Daniel's truck breaks down, and Kowlan's men capture them. Local police officer Timur, Daniel's friend, finds his abandoned vehicle and starts searching for him.

At Kowlan's camp, Daniel creates a distraction allowing the two doctors to escape. During the ensuing gun battle, worms emerge from the ground and eat Kowlan and his men. Daniel shoots at a fuel tank, blowing a worm. After retrieving the medical supplies from Daniel's truck, Alicia and Phillip arrive at Sepegal. Doctor Steffi informs them that sick, elderly people insist that epidemic is caused by the "death worms."

Patrick, desperate to fulfill his end of the black market deal, subdues Bixler and ties him up. Soon, another corporate manager shows up and is eaten by a death worm, to which Patrick remains oblivious.

Daniel arrives at Spegal warns Alicia about the worms, insisting they evacuate their clinic and patients. One of the local people suggest finding a phone and help at the oil drilling facility nearby. After they leave, a nurse is sucked in by a worm and killed. Phillip and Steffi run back to the clinic as the worms begin to surround it.

Arriving at the plant, Daniel and Alicia are confronted by one of Patrick's cohorts, Bana. He lets Daniel and Alicia inside when a worm appears behind them. Alicia theorizes that the worms were released from stasis because the operations pumped hot water deep into the earth. If the pumping stops, no new worms should be hatched. Daniel and Bana shut down the pumps, before Bana flees in panic.

As Bana emerges from the plant, Patrick, in the process of relocating a crate of stolen loot, shoots him in the back. Alicia uses the office phone to call Timur, explaining that Sepegal needs help. Timur rushes to Sepegal and help defend the clinic, killing several worms.

Daniel goes down to the lower levels of the plant and finds Genghis Khan's treasure in storage. Patrick and his associate confront him, holding Alicia at knifepoint. Daniel distracts Patrick by pointing out Bixler's remains, then wrestles the gun away, shooting Patrick in the shoulder. Worms emerge from the walls, eating Patrick's henchman. Patrick is eaten by the queen worm shortly after.

Timur arrives at the plant, discovers Bana's body and find Daniel and Alicia. Daniel discovers the room full of crates holding the treasure from the tomb. At Alicia behest, he reluctantly agrees that they must destroy the plant. As the worms close in, Daniel and Alicia build up the pressure in the generators and pipes. Timur defends them with a shotgun, but the queen eats him. Daniel and Alicia escape the exploding plant.

After returning Alicia to Sepegal, Daniel drives away, planning to collect the treasure scattered around the plant.

== Cast ==
- Sean Patrick Flanery as Daniel
- Victoria Pratt as Alicia
- George Cheung as Timur
- Drew Waters as Patrick
- Matthew Tompkins as Mr. Bixler
- Nate Rubin as Phillip
- Jon Mack as Steffi
- Cheryl Chin as Thuan
- Tiger Sheu as Bana
- Ryan Manalansan as Tali
- Andrew Stevens as Jackson

== Home media ==
Mongolian Death Worm was released on DVD on April 26, 2011 by Lions Gate Entertainment.

== Reception ==
Critical reception has been mixed, with several outlets alternating between praising and criticizing the movie for its cheesiness. DVD Verdict panned the movie, writing "Forgetting the really poor CGI, the problem is just how dumb you need to be for these giant worms to be a serious threat. Though the worms run up a decent body count, this is solely down to their victims' stupidity. One after another, people just stand dumbstruck, waiting for the amazingly slow-moving worms to devour them. You wouldn't even need to break a sweat to outpace these invertebrates." Dread Central also heavily criticized Mongolian Death Worms, calling it an "instantly forgettable Syfy monster-of-the-week formula feature" and also stating that "I'm sure for some it will pass the time on a rainy day. Hopefully you live in an arid climate."

In contrast, HorrorNews.net and BeyondHollywood.com both wrote overall favorable reviews for the movie, as both praised Flanery's performance and BeyondHollywood.com commented that "Bad movies fanatics will have no problem consuming the massive amount of cheese caked all over Steven R. Monroe's brisk little monster movie. And while Worm certainly doesn't redefine the genre, it should give SyFy original movie aficionados exactly what they're craving. At the end of the day, that's pretty much all you can ask for when you sit down with a movie that bears the title Mongolian Death Worm."
