= Chris Brinker =

American actor (1970–2013)

- Born: December 17, 1970; United States
- Died: February 8, 2013 (aged 42); Marina Del Ray, California, United States
- Occupations: Film producer, film director
- Partner: Erika Bruun-Anderson

Chris Brinker (December 17, 1970 – February 8, 2013) was an American film producer and director, known for his work in the film The Boondock Saints (1999), and also as an actor in a small role in that film. He was co-producer on Lonely Street (2008) and on The Boondock Saints II: All Saints Day (2009).

Before Brinker died suddenly in 2013, he was working with his friend Lloyd Segan on the film Baby Proof.

Brinker made his directorial debut, working with Matt Dillon, Kevin Chapman, and Willem Dafoe, in the feature film Bad Country, which was released in 2014.

Brinker was to be presented with the Robert Smalls Indie Vision Award at the 7th annual Beaufort, South Carolina International Film Festival in February 2013.

On October 3, 2013, the San Diego Film Festival honored his life and work by naming the annual award given to first time directors the Chris Brinker Award.

Since 2013, there has been an annual scholarship given to students from Point Loma High School where Brinker attended, on behalf of the CB Films Foundation to aspiring movie artists. His sister, Brea Brinker, founded the non-profit in his namesake to keep his legacy alive.
