= Lindsay Webb =

Australian comedian

- Born: 20 June 1973 (age 52); Brisbane, Queensland, Australia

Comedy career
- Medium: Comedian, presenter
- Website: www.lindsaywebb.com.au

Lindsay Webb (born 20 June 1973) is an Australian comedian based in Brisbane. Originally getting his break in radio Webb has been performing stand-up comedy all over the world since 1998, including major comedy festivals such as Melbourne International Comedy Festival and Adelaide Fringe.

He has also supported many of the world's top comedy stars on tour, including Jim Jeffries, Wayne Brady, Stephen K. Amos, Brad Garrett, Wil Anderson, and Tom Green.

== Guinness World Record ==
As well as headlining at major clubs and events all over the world, Webb also holds a Guinness Book of World Records record for the world's longest ever stand-up gig by a solo artist, performing for 38 hours and 6 minutes.
