= The Boondock Saints =

1999 film by Troy Duffy

- Theatrical release poster
- Directed by: Troy Duffy
- Written by: Troy Duffy
- Produced by: Elie Samaha; Lloyd Segan; Rob Fried; Chris Brinker
- Starring: Willem Dafoe; Sean Patrick Flanery; Norman Reedus; David Della Rocco; Billy Connolly
- Cinematography: Adam Kane
- Edited by: Bill DeRonde
- Music by: Jeff Danna
- Production companies: Franchise Pictures; Brood Syndicate; Fried Films; Lloyd Segan Company; Chris Brinker Productions
- Distributed by: Indican Pictures
- Release dates: November 19, 1999 (Denmark); January 21, 2000 (United States)
- Running time: 108 minutes
- Countries: United States; Canada
- Language: English
- Budget: $6 million
- Box office: $30,471

The Boondock Saints is a 1999 action thriller film written and directed by Troy Duffy in his feature directorial debut. Starring Willem Dafoe, Sean Patrick Flanery, Norman Reedus, David Della Rocco, and Billy Connolly, the film follows Irish fraternal twin brothers Connor and Murphy MacManus (Flanery and Reedus), who become vigilantes after killing two members of the Russian mafia in self defense. After both experience an epiphany, the twins, together with their best friend "Funny Man" Rocco (Rocco), set out on a mission to rid Boston of the criminal underworld in the name of God, all the while being pursued by FBI Special Agent Paul Smecker (Dafoe).

Duffy, who had never written a screenplay before, said he was inspired by personal experience while living with his brother Taylor in Los Angeles. Although the script was initially regarded as one of the hottest in Hollywood, the film had a troubled production. Miramax Films dropped the project in 1997 before Franchise Pictures acquired the rights the following year. Principal photography began in Boston and Toronto on August 10, 1998, and concluded on September 26.

Theatrical distribution was significantly affected by the Columbine High School massacre, which had taken place just two weeks before test screenings. Amidst concerns that the film would inspire copycat crimes, it was given a limited release in only five theaters across the United States on January 21, 2000. Consequently, the film was a box office failure and received negative reviews from critics, with criticism aimed at its perceived glorification of vigilante justice and violence. Despite this, The Boondock Saints became a cult classic through word of mouth and its home video release, ultimately grossing $50 million in sales.

A successful 2006 theatrical re-release led to a sequel, The Boondock Saints II: All Saints Day (2009), with Flanery, Reedus, Connolly, and Rocco reprising their roles, and Dafoe making an uncredited cameo appearance. Overnight (2003), a documentary about the making of the film, was also released. A third film is currently in development, with Flanery and Reedus expected to return.

== Plot ==
In Boston, Irish American fraternal twin brothers Connor and Murphy MacManus attend Mass, where the priest mentions the fate of Kitty Genovese. Later, while Connor and Murphy are celebrating Saint Patrick's Day with friends, three Russian mobsters arrive and try to shut down the pub so they can demolish it for the valuable land underneath. Despite Connor and Murphy's attempt to talk them down, a brawl ensues, in which the Russians are defeated and humiliated. The next morning, when two of the Russians seek revenge, the brothers beat them to death in self-defense.

FBI Special Agent Paul Smecker is assigned to the case and finds that the police and the press see the MacManus twins as heroes. The duo turn themselves in at a police station, where Smecker interviews them. After the twins retell their incident to Smecker, he declines to press charges and allows them to spend the night in a holding cell to avoid attention from the media. That night, they receive a "calling" from God telling them to rid Boston of all evil.

Connor learns that a local hotel is hosting a meeting of the Russian mob. Having equipped themselves with weaponry from an underground gun dealer, the twins kill nine Russian mobsters, while Rocco, a friend of the twins and errand boy for local mafia boss Giuseppe "Papa Joe" Yakavetta, surprises them after being sent by his boss to carry out a hit. Realizing that he was set up, Rocco agrees to help Connor and Murphy. That night, they hunt down and kill Vincenzo Lapazzi, Papa Joe's underboss, at a peep show.

Falsely believing that Rocco is behind the murders, Papa Joe hires the legendary hitman "Il Duce" to deal with the problem. Rocco takes revenge on his former crew and convinces the twins to shoot up a gambling den so he can execute a criminal he was once forced to assist in a heinous crime. As they depart, the trio are ambushed by Il Duce. Although they manage to repel the attack, the three men suffer serious wounds, including the loss of Rocco's finger. The trio retreat to a safehouse where they cauterize their wounds.

Hours later, as the police secure the crime scene, the investigation seems futile since the twins covered their tracks by spraying any blood left behind with ammonia. However, Smecker happens upon Rocco's finger and analyzes it, eventually tracing the clues back to Rocco and his allies. This leaves Smecker in a difficult conundrum; he struggles with the choice of whether to prosecute the three men or join them in their cause as he believes they are doing the right thing. After getting drunk at a gay bar and subsequently taking advice from a reluctant priest (who is being held at gunpoint by Rocco, who is being held at gunpoint by one of the twins), Smecker decides to help the trio.

Later, the twins and Rocco inform Smecker that they plan to assassinate Papa Joe at his mansion, but Smecker learns that they are walking into a trap. The twins are captured, and Rocco is shot and killed by Papa Joe. As Papa Joe leaves, Smecker arrives disguised as a prostitute and tries to rescue them before being knocked unconscious by Il Duce. While the twins say their family prayer over Rocco, Il Duce enters the room and prepares to open fire. However, he instead finishes the prayer – revealing he is the twins' father and deciding to join his sons in their mission.

Three months later, Papa Joe is on trial for the third time. However, the on-scene reporters anticipate his acquittal. The twins and Il Duce, aided by Smecker and a group of sympathetic Boston Police Department detectives, infiltrate the courthouse and take the spectators hostage. Unmasked, they make a speech stating that they intend to eradicate evil wherever they find it before reciting their family prayer and publicly executing Papa Joe. The media dubs the three as "the Saints".

== Cast ==
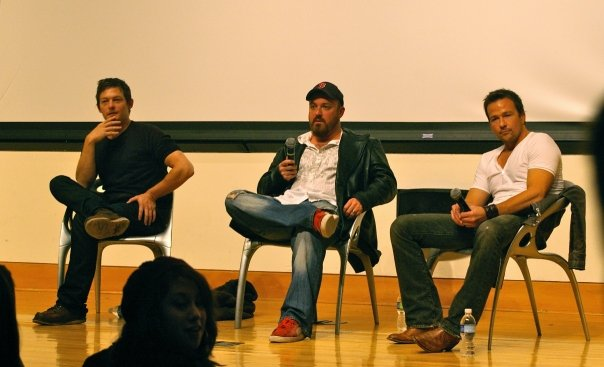
Norman Reedus (left), Troy Duffy (center), and Sean Patrick Flanery (right) at Drexel University in Philadelphia

- Willem Dafoe as Paul Smecker, a brilliant but emotionally troubled FBI special agent assigned to the murders linked to the MacManus twins.
- Sean Patrick Flanery as Connor MacManus, one-half of the MacManus twins. He has a tattoo on his left hand that reads "Veritas" ("truth" in Latin). He is more sensible and rational than his brother, and often tries to carefully plan out their missions; however, he usually and foolishly bases his plans on the plots of classic action movies. Connor frequently references John Wayne, Clint Eastwood, and Charles Bronson.
- Norman Reedus as Murphy MacManus, the other half of the MacManus twins. He has a tattoo on his right hand that reads "Aequitas" ("justice/equality" in Latin). He seems to be the more emotional and hot-headed of the two; however, Murphy is usually shown to be exasperated by his brother's inept planning and displays a stronger sense of adaptability and cool headedness in difficult situations.
- David Della Rocco as David "The Funny Man" Della Rocco, a henchman of the Yakavetta clan until Papa Joe sets him up to be killed, and a loyal friend of the MacManus twins.
- Billy Connolly as Noah "Il Duce" MacManus, the father of Connor and Murphy and a famous mob assassin. He is released from prison by Yakavetta to confront the twins and Rocco, only to assist the twins after learning who they are.
- Bob Marley as Detective David Greenly, a marginally competent Boston Police Department detective assigned to the gang murders.
- David Ferry as Detective "Dolly" Alapopskalius, a detective partnered with Greenly and Duffy.
- Brian Mahoney as Detective Duffy, a detective partnered with Greenly and Dolly.
- Richard Fitzpatrick as The Chief of the Boston Police Department.
- Dorothy Marie-Jones as Rosengurtle Baumgartener, a new employee at the meat packing plant where the MacManus twins work.
- Carlo Rota as Giuseppe "Papa Joe" Yakavetta, a leader of a powerful mafia in Boston.
- Ron Jeremy as Vincenzo Lapazzi, Yakavetta's right-hand man.
- Carmen DiStefano as Augustus DiStephano, a retired mobster who helps Papa Joe get Il Duce out of prison. He is secretly one of Smecker's informants.
- Gerard Parkes as "Doc" McGinty, the owner of an Irish-themed pub who has Tourette syndrome with coprolalia.
- Tom Barnett as the Irish gun dealer who supplies the Saints with guns.
- Lauren Piech as Donna, Rocco's junkie girlfriend.
- Gina Sorell as Rayvie, Donna's junkie friend.
- Dick Callahan as Sal, a restaurant owner and associate of the Yakavetta family. He is killed by Rocco in anger over his set-up.
- Angelo Tucci as Vinnie, Rocco's associate and one of his victims.
- Sergio Di Zio as Oly, Rocco's associate who also winds up dead at his hands.
- Kevin Chapman as "Chappy", one of Papa Joe's caporegimes.
- Markus Parilo as Sick Mob Man, a professional cleaner of the Yakavetta syndicate and a victim of the Saints.
- Layton Morrison as Vladdy, a Russian Mafia soldier slain by Connor.
- Scott Griffith as Ivan Checkov, a Russian Mafia soldier who is also killed by Connor.
- Viktor Pedtchenko as Yuri Petrova, the Russian Mafia boss who becomes the first high-profile mobster to be executed by the Saints.
- Troy Duffy as a bar patron on St. Patrick's Day.

== Production ==
Troy Duffy's screenplay was inspired by his disgust at seeing a drug dealer taking money from a corpse across the hall from his apartment. Duffy, who was working as a bartender and bouncer, had never written a screenplay before.

Duffy completed the screenplay in the fall of 1996 and passed it to a producer's assistant at New Line Cinema to be read by a senior executive. The screenplay changed hands through multiple studios and Duffy was approached by multiple producers for the rights. In March 1997, he was contracted by Paramount Pictures for $500,000, and later in the month, Miramax Films won a bidding war to buy The Boondock Saints. The studio offered $450,000 to Duffy to write and direct the film. The documentary Overnight (2003), which chronicled Duffy's "rags-to-riches-to-rags" story, showed that the script was worth $300,000, and the film itself was originally given a $15 million budget by Miramax's Harvey Weinstein. Duffy's band The Brood would do the soundtrack, and as a bonus, Miramax offered to buy and include co-ownership of J. Sloan's, where Duffy worked. Overnight showed that Duffy frequently exhibited abrasive behavior, causing tension for many people involved in the project. Filming of The Boondock Saints was scheduled for the coming autumn in Boston.

=== Casting and funding ===
Duffy sought to cast Stephen Dorff and Mark Wahlberg as the brothers, though Wahlberg passed on the role to star in Boogie Nights (1997). The director also wanted to cast Billy Connolly and Kenneth Branagh in the film, with Branagh playing FBI Agent Paul Smecker. Duffy also expressed interest in casting Brendan Fraser, Nicky Katt, Keanu Reeves, Ethan Hawke, and Ewan McGregor, with two of them as the brothers, but no decisions were finalized. The director later sought Patrick Swayze to play Smecker, but Miramax preferred Sylvester Stallone (with whom the studio had an existing relationship), Bill Murray, or Mike Myers. Kevin Spacey and Robert De Niro were also considered for the role of Smecker. Before pre-production was scheduled to begin in Boston in December 1997, Miramax pulled out of the project. Producer Lloyd Segan said that the project had stalled because of casting and location problems. While Duffy was able to keep the writer's fee of $300,000, the studio required the reimbursement of the $150,000 director's fee and the $700,000 advance to develop the project.

The independent studio Franchise Pictures sought to finance the project once other elements were in place. Duffy approached Sean Patrick Flanery and Norman Reedus to play the brothers, and Willem Dafoe to play the FBI agent. Having found someone to back the film, filming began in Toronto, with the final scenes being filmed in Boston. The name of Duffy's band, The Brood, was changed to The Boondock Saints, following the movie's release. The film featured two songs from the band: "Holy Fool", which played during Rocco's tavern shootout, and "Pipes", which played during the credits.

== Release ==
The Boondock Saints had a very limited theatrical release through Indican Pictures in 2000 on only five screens in the United States for several weeks. However, the original unrated version was later re-released in theaters on May 22, 2006. Duffy later funded screenings with help from Blockbuster Video. "Indican Pictures and Blockbuster saved us [...] They agreed to take it on exclusively, and from there the rest is history." According to Duffy on his DVD audio commentary, the film's distributor allowed the limited screening in the United States because of the then-recent Columbine High School massacre and the pending Blockbuster exclusive.

The film was shown on major international screens (most notably in Japan) with success. Blockbuster released The Boondock Saints as a "Blockbuster Exclusive", a collection of independent direct-to-video films. The Boondock Saints gained a following mostly due to word-of-mouth publicity and was a bestseller when released on DVD. Despite its success, Duffy and Indican Pictures never saw any of the profits, having signed away the home media rights to 20th Century Fox Home Entertainment as part of the settlement with Franchise Pictures. According to Duffy, neither he, his producers, nor his principal cast got paid. He sued Franchise Pictures and other undisclosed companies for royalties of the first film and rights to the sequel. After a lengthy lawsuit, Duffy, his producers, and the principal cast received an undisclosed amount of The Boondock Saints royalties, as well as the sequel rights.

=== Home media ===
The Boondock Saints has been released numerous times on DVD, including an import on March 13, 2001, and an uncut Japanese release published by Toshiba Entertainment, whose special features include anamorphic widescreen, audio commentary, trailers, and interviews with the Japanese media.

On May 23, 2006, The Boondock Saints Collector's Edition was published and released by 20th Century Fox Home Entertainment on DVD with THX-certified Dolby audio, as well as on Universal Media Disc for the PlayStation Portable. The special features include English and Spanish subtitles, commentary by Connolly and Duffy, deleted scenes, and outtakes. It also featured the film's trailer, cast and crew filmographies, and a printable script. Fox and Duffy showed an interest in doing a new audio commentary for the special release, but he was ultimately unable to because of unresolved legal issues. The film was released on Blu-ray on February 10, 2009.

== Reception ==
On the review aggregator website Rotten Tomatoes, 26% of 31 critics' reviews are positive, with an average rating of 4.6/10. The website's consensus reads: "A juvenile, ugly movie that represents the worst tendencies of directors channeling Tarantino." Metacritic, which uses a weighted average, assigned the film a score of 44 out of 100, based on 4 critics, indicating "mixed or average" reviews.

Nathan Rabin of The A.V. Club described the film, in his review of the DVD, as "less a proper action-thriller" than "a series of gratuitously violent setpieces strung together with only the sketchiest semblance of a plot". Rabin went on to describe the film as "all style and no substance, a film so gleeful in its endorsement of vigilante justice that it almost veers (or ascends) into self-parody."

Robert Koehler of Variety wrote in his review: "A belated entry in the hipster crime movie movement that began with Reservoir Dogs, Troy Duffy's Boondock Saints mixes blood and Catholic-tinged vigilante justice in excessive portions for sometimes wacky and always brutal effect. [The film is] more interested in finding fresh ways to stage execution scenes than in finding meaning behind the human urge for self-appointed righting of wrongs."

Koehler also described Flanery and Reedus as "curiously stolid and blank", while praising supporting actors Connolly, Dafoe, and Rota for making the most of their screen time. Koehler also praised the tech personnel: "This uneven exercise in pacing and cutting is abetted by an eclectic score by Jeff Danna and whiz lensing by Adam Kane. Other tech credits fire bull's-eyes."

Film critics have taken note of the film's extreme violence and "slow-motion bloodletting".

=== Box office ===
In its original run, the film only earned $30,471 at five theaters. It later developed a cult following and has grossed about $50 million in domestic video sales.

== Documentary ==
The documentary film Overnight was released in 2003, following the story of Troy Duffy during his negotiations with Miramax over The Boondock Saints script, as well as his band's struggles to secure a recording contract. Duffy's abrasive behavior strained his relationships with friends and people in the film industry and ultimately led to Miramax pulling out of the project, leaving the film to be made by another studio at half the originally proposed budget.

== Sequels ==
After numerous delays, Troy Duffy shot a sequel, The Boondock Saints II: All Saints Day, in which the MacManus twins return to Boston in order to continue their reign of vengeance. It was released October 30, 2009.

In an October 27, 2009, article, director Duffy and actor Connolly mention details regarding a possible third film. They maintained that "it is slowly in the works and is still just an idea". Duffy insists that he wants to get a few more of his films done before returning to the Boondock Saints. Duffy also added that the proposed working title for the third film would be called "Boondock Saints III: Saints Preserve Us".

Again, on February 26, 2013, Duffy stated that he was getting together with Reedus and Flanery to resume talks about The Boondock Saints 3, in hopes that they could make the film a reality for fans.

As of July 2013, Duffy has confirmed in an interview that he is working on the script for the third film, and possibly a TV series, later named as The Boondock Saints: Origins.

On September 3, 2014, the third film, subtitled Legion, was revealed to be in pre-production.

In 2017, Flanery tweeted that he and Reedus had walked away from The Boondock Saints 3, citing disputes over production issues.

In November 2021, a third Boondock Saints film was officially announced, with Reedus and Flanery reprising their roles as Connor and Murphy MacManus and Duffy returning to direct. Production was slated to begin in May 2022. In March 2024, Thunder Road Films, Dragonfly Films and Impossible Dream Entertainment announced a "reimagining" of the franchise, with Reedus and Flanery reprising their roles and serving as executive producers, although Duffy would not return as director.

== Comic book ==
A two-part comic-book story, serving as a companion to the movie sequel, was released in May 2010. The series is written by Troy Duffy, produced by Innfusion Inc., and released through 12 Gauge Comics. The book focuses on a more in-depth version of Il Duce's back story, as well as telling the story of the brothers during a hit they performed that is not featured in the film. It was paired with a minibook that was featured on the official Boondock Saints website that told a ministory that takes place before the strip-club scene from the first film. These will eventually be released in one single graphic novel. The Boondock Saints: In Nomine Patris was written with J.B. Love and published in November 2011.

== Video game ==
A video game was supposed to be made based on the film, but was later cancelled. The characters of Connor and Murphy would feature in the side-scroller Broforce, which released in 2015.

== See also ==
- Tarantinoesque film
