= Sean Patrick Flanery =

American actor (born 1965)

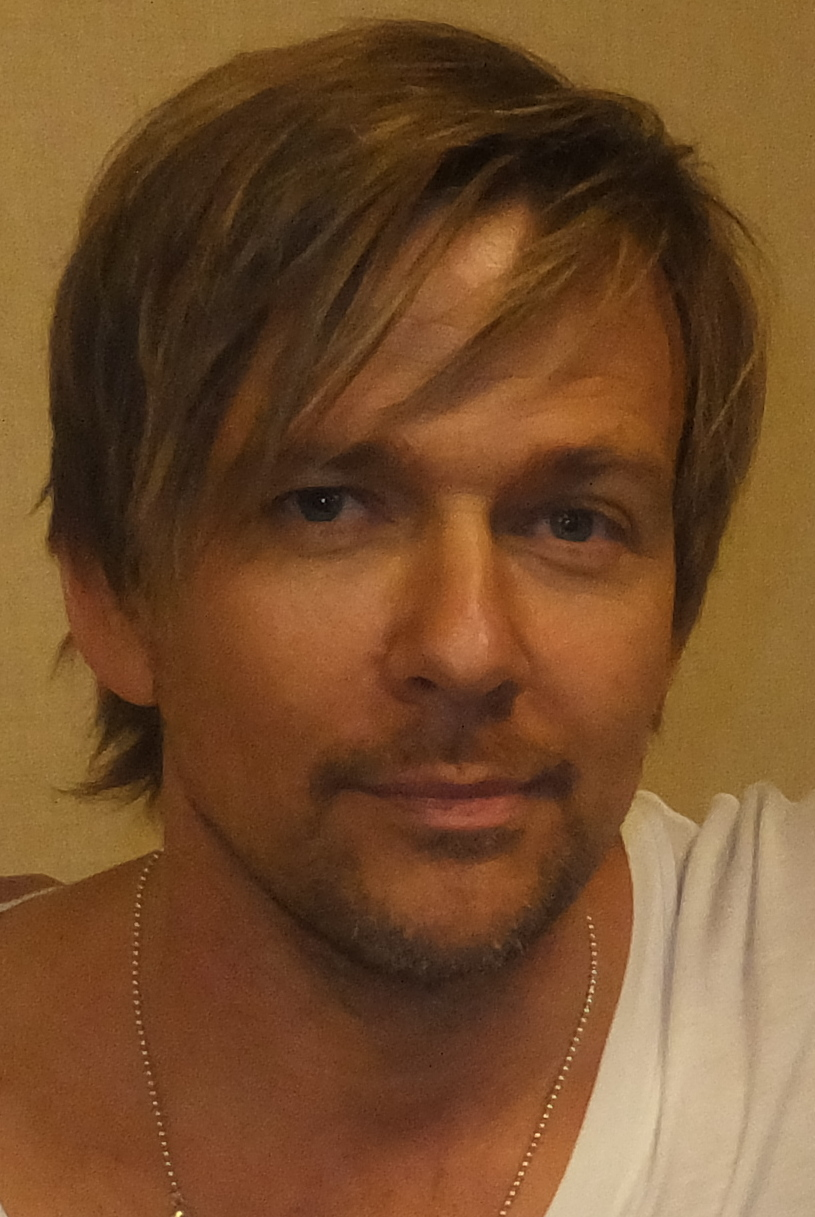
- Flanery in 2014
- Born: October 11, 1965 (age 61); Lake Charles, Louisiana, U.S.
- Education: University of St. Thomas (attended)
- Occupations: Actor, author
- Years active: 1987–present
- Spouse: Lauren Michelle Hill
- Children: 3

Sean Patrick Flanery (born October 11, 1965) is an American actor. He is known for playing Connor MacManus in The Boondock Saints (1999) and its sequel The Boondock Saints II: All Saints Day (2009), Greg Stillson in the television series The Dead Zone, Jeremy "Powder" Reed in Powder (1995), Indiana Jones in the George Lucas television series The Young Indiana Jones Chronicles, as well as Bobby Dagen in Saw 3D (2010). He is also known for his role as Sam Gibson on the CBS soap opera The Young and the Restless in 2011. He starred in Devil's Carnival, a short film which was screened on tour beginning in April 2012.

In 2016, he published his first novel, Jane Two, a coming-of-age story drawing inspiration from his own childhood and early experiences.

== Early life ==
Flanery was born on October 11, 1965, in Lake Charles, Louisiana and was raised in Houston, Texas. His mother, Genie (née LeDoux), is a real estate broker, and his father, Paul Flanery, is a medical equipment salesman. His ancestry includes Irish, Cajun (French), and English. After attending Awty International School, Flanery graduated from Dulles High School in Sugar Land, and attended the University of St. Thomas in Houston.

== Acting career ==
Flanery started acting in college at University of St. Thomas, after he joined an acting class to meet a girl on whom he had a crush. After graduating college, he decided to move to Los Angeles, California to pursue his career in screenwriting. Beginning his career as a playwright, while working as a server at TGI Fridays, Flanery was eventually discovered while acting in a play by Natalie Rossan who approached him to appear in television commercials before being offered roles in television and film.

Since 1988, he has appeared in over 53 films, including Powder, Simply Irresistible, and D-Tox. He is best known, however, for playing Indiana Jones in The Young Indiana Jones Chronicles and Connor MacManus in The Boondock Saints and The Boondock Saints II: All Saints Day. He had a role as the ascended being Orlin in the Stargate SG-1 episode "Ascension". He appeared on the TV show The Dead Zone in the role of Vice-President, Greg Stillson, until its cancellation. Flanery also appeared in an installment of Showtime's Masters of Horror playing a town sheriff who later became one of the antagonistic entity's possessed hosts in the episode "The Damned Thing". In March 2010, he was cast in the lead role in the sci-fi horror film Mongolian Death Worm. In 2010, he played Bobby Dagen in Saw 3D.

Flanery appeared in The Black Keys' music video "Howlin' For You", which was released on February 10, 2011. In April 2011 Flanery headed to the CBS soap The Young and the Restless, playing the part of Sam, Sharon Newman's boyfriend from New Mexico.

In March 2024, Thunder Road Films, Dragonfly Films and Impossible Dream Entertainment announced a "reimagining" of The Boondock Saints, with Flanery and co-star Norman Reedus reprising their roles from the first two films and serving as executive producers, although Troy Duffy would not return as director for the third film; instead he plans to write a series of novels.

== Other activities ==
In 2016, he published his first novel, Jane Two, a coming-of-age story drawing inspiration from his own childhood and early experiences.

== Awards ==
Flanery won the award for Outstanding Guest Performer in a Digital Daytime Drama Series at the 46th Annual Daytime Creative Arts Emmy Awards for his role as Ty Garrett on The Bay.

== Personal life ==
Flanery is married to model and actress Lauren Michelle Hill. He is a close friend with actor Norman Reedus, with whom he co-starred in The Boondock Saints and its sequel.

Flanery won the 1997 Toyota Pro-Celebrity Race at the Toyota Grand Prix of Long Beach as the celebrity driver; the "Alfonso Ribeiro rule" (whereby if a celebrity wins, he must be classified as a professional the next time) forced him to "defend" his title as a professional driver under TGPLB rules, and he won the 1998 race as a professional driver.

Flanery is also a 4th degree black belt in Brazilian Jiu-Jitsu, which he teaches. He placed first in the Master 1/ Blue/ Male/ Light division at the 2003 American National IBJJF Jiu-jitsu Championship and the 2003 Pan Jiu-jitsu IBJJF Championship by the International Brazilian Jiu-Jitsu Federation. Flanery indicated in an interview that, at one point, he considered competing in mixed martial arts, saying "If it didn't come around so late in my life, that would've 100 percent been my trajectory."

Flanery is a Christian and attributes his role as a father to his convictions in his beliefs, stating: "I meet a lot of friends that they say, 'Well, I don't believe, because I can't explain it.' For me, that's exactly why I believe, because I can't explain it." He is conservative in expressing his firm beliefs in Ayn Randian philosophy, the importance of preserving the Constitution of the United States and the family unit, and the associated risks of modern criticism of the US and its foundation.

== Filmography ==
Key
†	Denotes works that have not yet been released

=== Film ===
List of films and roles
Year	Title	Role	Notes
1987	A Tiger's Tale	Buddy	
1993	Kingdom Come		Direct-to-video
1994	Frank & Jesse	Zack Murphy	
1995	The Grass Harp	Riley Henderson	
1995	Raging Angels	Chris	
1995	Powder	Jeremy 'Powder' Reed	
1996	Just Your Luck	Ray	Direct-to-video
1996	The Method	Christian	Also executive producer
1996	Eden	Dave Edgerton	
1997	Pale Saints	Louis	
1997	Suicide Kings	Max Minot	
1997	Best Men	Billy Phillips	
1998	Girl	Todd Sparrow	
1998	Zack and Reba	Zack Blanton	
1999	Simply Irresistible	Tom Bartlett	
1999	The Boondock Saints	Connor MacManus	
1999	Body Shots	Rick Hamilton	
2002	Kiss the Bride	Tom Terranova	
2002	Con Express	Alex Brooks	Direct-to-video
2002	D-Tox	Conner	
2002	Lone Hero	John	
2002	Borderline	Ed Baikman	
2004	The Gunman	Ben Simms	
2004	30 Days Until I'm Famous		
2005	Demon Hunter	Jake Greyman	
2006	The Insatiable	Harry Balbo	Direct-to-video
2007	Veritas, Prince of Truth	Veritas	
2007	Ten Inch Hero	Noah	
2008	Crystal River	Clay Arrendal	
2009	Deadly Impact	Tom Armstrong	
2009	The Whole Truth	Gary Langston	
2009	The Boondock Saints II: All Saints Day	Connor MacManus	
2009	Citizen Jane		
2010	Sinners & Saints	Colin	Direct-to-video
2010	Scavengers	Captain Jekel	
2010	Saw 3D	Bobby Dagen	
2011	InSight	Detective Peter Rafferty	
2012	The Devil's Carnival	John	Short film
2013	Phantom	Tyrtov	
2015	Broken Horses	Ignacio	
2016	Gibby	Frank	
2016	Beyond Valkyrie: Dawn of the 4th Reich	Capt. Evan Blackburn	
2016	My First Miracle	Charlie	
2016	Johnny Frank Garrett's Last Word	District Attorney Danny Hill	
2017	Trafficked	Simon	
2017	The Evil Within	John	
2017	Flashburn	Wes Nolan	
2017	Kepler's Dream	Walt	
2017	Furthest Witness	The Florist	
2018	Unhinged	Steve Walsh	
2018	Lasso	Ennis	
2018	Howlers	Bob Barlow	
2019	100 Yards	Ray	
2019	2177: The San Francisco Love Hacker Crimes	Burnett Adams	
2019	American Fighter	Duke	
2019	Acceleration	Kane	
2019	The Outsider	Chris King	
2020	The Orchard	Martin Ellsbury	
2020	Lady Driver	Tim Lansing	
2021	Born a Champion	Mickey Kelley	Also writer and producer
2021	Assault on VA-33	Jason Hill	
2021	Insight	Wallace Jackson	
2021	All I Want for Christmas	Hank	
2022	Love Hurts	Detective Holden	
2022	Frank and Penelope	Club Manager	Also writer and director
2023	The Weapon	U.S. Marshall Antano	
2023	Get the Girl	Mr. Fun	
2023	Nefarious	Edward Wayne Brady and Nefariamus / "Nefarious"	
2025	Killing Mary Sue †	Cable Henry	Post-production

=== Television ===
List of television appearances and roles
Year	Title	Role	Notes
1990	Just Perfect		Television film
1990	My Life as a Babysitter		Television film
1992– 1993	The Young Indiana Jones Chronicles	Indiana Jones (age 16–21)	22 episodes
1993	The Accident	The Driver	Television film
1994	Guinevere	King Arthur	Television film
1994	The Adventures of Young Indiana Jones: Hollywood Follies	Indiana Jones (age 21)	Television film
1995	The Adventures of Young Indiana Jones: Treasure of the Peacock's Eye	Indiana Jones (age 19)	Television film
1995	The Adventures of Young Indiana Jones: Attack of the Hawkmen	Indiana Jones (age 17)	Television film
1996	The Adventures of Young Indiana Jones: Travels with Father	Indiana Jones (age 19)	Television film
1999	The Adventures of Young Indiana Jones: Spring Break Adventure	Indiana Jones (age 16)	Re-edited series (with new connecting segments)
1999	The Adventures of Young Indiana Jones: Adventures in the Secret Service	Indiana Jones (age 17)	Re-edited series (with new connecting segments)
1999	The Adventures of Young Indiana Jones: Daredevils of the Desert	Indiana Jones (age 18)	Re-edited series (with new scenes)
1999	The Adventures of Young Indiana Jones: Tales of Innocence	Indiana Jones (age 18)	Re-edited series (with new scenes)
1999	The Adventures of Young Indiana Jones: Masks of Evil	Indiana Jones (age 19)	Re-edited series (with new connecting segments)
1999– 2000	The Strip	Elvis Ford	10 episodes
2000	The Adventures of Young Indiana Jones: Love's Sweet Song	Indiana Jones (age 16)	Re-edited series (with new connecting segments)
2000	The Adventures of Young Indiana Jones: Demons Of Deception	Indiana Jones (age 17)	Re-edited series (with new connecting segments)
2000	Run the Wild Fields	Tom Walker	Television film
2000	The Outer Limits	Eric	Episode: "Stasis"
2001	The Adventures of Young Indiana Jones: Espionage Escapades	Indiana Jones (age 18)	Re-edited series (with new connecting segments)
2001	The Adventures of Young Indiana Jones: Winds of Change	Indiana Jones (age 19)	Re-edited series (with new scenes)
2001	The Diamond Hunters	Johnny Lance	unknown episodes
2001	Acceptable Risk	Bobby	Television film
2001	Stargate SG-1	Orlin	Episode: "Ascension"
2001	Touched by an Angel	Daniel Lee Corbitt	Episode: "Famous Last Words"
2002	Charmed	Adam	Episode: "Happily Ever After"
2002– 2007	Stephen King's Dead Zone	Greg Stillson / Vice President Greg Stillson	19 episodes
2003	Then Came Jones	Sheriff Ben Jones	Television film
2003	The Twilight Zone	Dr. Paul Thorson	Episode: "Cold Fusion"
2004	Dead Lawyers	Jimmy Blake	Television film
2004	30 Days Until I'm Famous	Cole Thompson	Television film
2005	Into the Fire	Walter Harwig Jr.	Television film
2006	Savage Planet	Randall Cain	Television film
2006	Secrets of a Small Town	Jimmy Lee Daniels	Pilot episode
2006	CSI: Crime Scene Investigation	The Big Hombre	Episode: "Double Cross"
2006	Masters of Horror	Sheriff Kevin Reddle	Episode: "The Damned Thing"
2007	KAW	Wayne	Syfy Television film
2007	Numb3rs	Jeff Upchurch	Episode: "Tabu"
2008	No Game	Devlin	Television film; also director and executive producer
2009	Criminal Minds	Darrin Call	Episode: "Haunted"
2010	Mongolian Death Worm	Daniel	Television film
2011	The Young and the Restless	Sam Gibson	Soap opera; April 18 - November 4
2011	A Crush on You	Ben Martin	Hallmark TV Film
2013	Dexter	Jacob Elway	Season 8
2018	The Bay	Ty Garrett	3 episodes
2022	Rock Me	Jibs McCaffrey	1 episode
2022	The Boys	Gunpowder	Episode: "The Only Man in the Sky"
