= Troy Duffy =

American film director

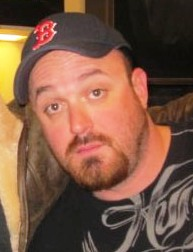
- Duffy in 2009
- Born: 1970 or 1971 (age 54–55); Hartford, Connecticut, U.S.
- Occupation: Filmmaker
- Years active: 1999–present
- Spouse: Angela (m. 2007)

Troy Duffy (born 1970 or 1971) is an American filmmaker. He has directed two films, The Boondock Saints and its sequel The Boondock Saints II: All Saints Day. Duffy was the subject of the 2003 documentary film Overnight.

== Early life ==
Duffy was born in Hartford, Connecticut. He was one of five children, and his father is a Harvard-educated English teacher. Duffy was born to a wealthy family that bought several hotels among the New Hampshire and southern Maine coast, where Duffy spent most of his youth. He graduated from Exeter High School in New Hampshire, and spent two years at Colorado State University before dropping out to move to Hollywood with $2,000 given to him by his father.

== Career ==
=== Film ===
Duffy moved to Los Angeles in his twenties to pursue a music career with his band, the Brood. While working at a bar, he wrote the screenplay of The Boondock Saints, which was inspired by seeing a dead woman being wheeled out of a drug dealer's apartment in his building. The script featured two brothers in Boston dedicated to killing Mafia thugs. He explained:

I decided right there that out of sheer frustration and not being able to afford a psychologist, I was going to write this, think about it. People watching the news sometimes get so disgusted by what they see. Susan Smith drowning her kids...guys going into McDonald's, lighting up the whole place ... One day you're gonna watch the news and you're gonna say, 'Whoever did that despicable thing should pay with their life.' You think—for maybe just a minute—that whoever did that should die, without any fuckin' jury. I was going to give everybody that sick fantasy.

Duffy completed the screenplay in fall of 1996 and passed it to a producer's assistant at New Line Cinema. In March 1997, he was contracted by Paramount Pictures for $500,000, and later in the month, Miramax Films won a bidding war to buy The Boondock Saints. The studio offered $450,000 to Duffy to write and direct the film, and it was given a $15 million budget by Miramax's Harvey Weinstein. Duffy's band the Brood would do the soundtrack, and Miramax offered to buy and throw in co-ownership of J. Sloan's, the bar where Duffy worked.

Filming of The Boondock Saints was scheduled for the coming autumn in Boston. Before pre-production, Miramax pulled out of the project in December 1997 due to casting and location problems, and Franchise Pictures took over the project at less than half of Miramax's original budget. Filming began in Toronto and the final scenes were filmed in Boston. After completion, the film was unsuccessfully shopped for distributors at the 1999 Cannes Film Festival. The film was eventually picked up by a small company for a limited theatrical release on five U.S. screens for just seven days. The film received negative reviews, but was more successful on home video, grossing over $50 million in domestic sales.

Duffy directed the sequel to The Boondock Saints, titled The Boondock Saints II: All Saints Day which was released on October 30, 2009. The film grossed $11 million at the box office against an $8 million budget. Like its predecessor, the film received negative reviews.

Duffy's rise to fame was chronicled in two documentaries: Off the Boulevard (2011), by Jeff Santo, and Overnight (2003), by Tony Montana and Mark Brian Smith.

Duffy co-wrote the 2020 comedy film Guest House, which was directed by Sam Macaroni and stars Pauly Shore.

=== Music ===
Duffy's band the Brood, who had performed two songs on The Boondock Saints soundtrack, were signed by Atlantic Records in 1999 and renamed the Boondock Saints. In 2000, they released their only album, the Jeff Baxter-produced Release the Hounds, which sold 690 copies in total. Jason Anderson of AllMusic gave the album a mixed review (3 stars out of 5), stating the best material was reminiscent of Alice in Chains or Bon Jovi but the album as a whole was bogged down by "thin production and weak lyrics."

== Filmography ==
Year	Title	Director	Writer	Executive Producer
1999	The Boondock Saints	Yes	Yes	No
2009	The Boondock Saints II: All Saints Day	Yes	Yes	No
2020	Guest House	No	Yes	No
2027	The Boondock Saints III	No	Yes	Yes

Documentary appearance

- Overnight (2003)
