= Auto Focus =

- Theatrical release poster
- Directed by: Paul Schrader
- Written by: Michael Gerbosi
- Based on: The Murder of Bob Crane by Robert Graysmith
- Produced by: Scott Alexander Larry Karaszewski; Alicia Allain; Pat Dollard; Brian Oliver; Todd Rosken
- Starring: Greg Kinnear; Willem Dafoe; Rita Wilson; Maria Bello; Ron Leibman
- Cinematography: Jeffrey Greeley; Fred Murphy
- Edited by: Kristina Boden
- Music by: Angelo Badalamenti
- Production companies: Propaganda Films; Good Machine
- Distributed by: Sony Pictures Classics
- Release date: October 18, 2002 (United States)
- Running time: 105 minutes
- Country: United States
- Language: English
- Budget: $7 million
- Box office: $2.7 million

Auto Focus is a 2002 American biographical drama film directed by Paul Schrader and starring Greg Kinnear and Willem Dafoe. The screenplay by Michael Gerbosi is based on Robert Graysmith's book The Murder of Bob Crane (1993).

Auto Focus tells a dramatized story of actor Bob Crane, an affable radio show host and amateur drummer who found success on the popular sitcom Hogan's Heroes, and his dramatic descent into the underbelly of Hollywood after the series was cancelled and he formed a friendship with videographer John Henry Carpenter.

Carpenter was later tried, and acquitted in 1994 of Crane's murder. Although the crime remains officially unsolved, Carpenter has remained the main subject of suspicion even after his death in 1998.

== Plot ==
Disc-jockey-turned-actor Bob Crane develops a secret personal life after befriending John Henry Carpenter, an electronics expert involved with the nascent home video market. Encouraged by Carpenter and enabled by his expertise, Crane—a church-going, clean-cut family man—becomes a sex addict, initiating encounters with many women and recording these encounters with video and photographic equipment, usually with Carpenter participating.

As the years pass, the relationship between Crane and Carpenter unravels. Crane's wife, Anne, divorces him; he later marries Patricia Olson, a co-star from his TV series Hogan's Heroes. After the show goes off-the-air, Crane struggles to find work and deals with money troubles. By the time Walt Disney Productions hires him for the leading role in a family movie, Superdad, his reputation for obsession with sex and pornography has jeopardized his image.

Resigned to doing dinner theater in mid-sized cities, Crane's attempts to distance himself from Carpenter fail and their sexual escapades continue. Carpenter ends up becoming Crane's "only friend". In 1978 they have a final falling-out in Scottsdale, Arizona when Crane tells Carpenter that he wants to start a new life without the latter's influence. Soon after, Crane is bludgeoned to death while he sleeps in a motel room. Carpenter is tried for the murder and acquitted in 1994. Crane's murder remains unsolved.

== Cast ==
- Greg Kinnear as Bob Crane
- Willem Dafoe as John Henry Carpenter
- Rita Wilson as Anne Crane
- Maria Bello as Patricia Olson-Crane / Sigrid Valdis
- Ron Leibman as Lenny
- Michael E. Rodgers as Richard Dawson
- Kurt Fuller as Werner Klemperer
- Grand L. Bush as Ivan Dixon
- Christopher Neiman as Robert Clary
- Ed Begley Jr. as Mel Rosen
- Michael McKean as Video Executive
- Roderick L. McCarthy as Bartender
- John Kapelos as Bruno Gerussi
- Lyle Kanouse as John Banner
- Bruce Solomon as Edward H. Feldman

== Production ==
The film premiered at the Toronto International Film Festival and was shown at the San Sebastián Film Festival, the Helsinki International Film Festival, the Chicago International Film Festival, the New Orleans Film Festival, and the Bergen International Film Festival before going into limited release on eleven screens in the US, earning $123,761 on its opening weekend. It grossed $2,063,196 in the US and $641,755 in foreign markets for a total worldwide box office of $2,704,951.

== Release ==
=== Critical reception ===
The film met with a largely positive reception from critics. On review aggregator website Rotten Tomatoes, the film holds an approval rating of 71% based on 163 reviews, and an average rating of 6.64/10. The website's critical consensus states, "Kinnear and Dafoe help make this downward spiral of one man's life a compelling watch." On Metacritic, the film has a weighted average score of 66 out of 100, based on 36 critics, indicating "generally favorable" reviews.

A. O. Scott of The New York Times said the film "gets to you like a low-grade fever, a malaise with no known antidote. When it was over, I wasn't sure if I needed a drink, a shower or a lifelong vow of chastity ... there is [a] severe, powerful moralism lurking beneath the film's dispassionate matter-of-factness. Mr. Schrader is indifferent to the sinner, but he cannot contain his loathing of the sin, which is not so much sex as the fascination with images ... To argue that images can corrupt the flesh and hollow out the soul is, for a filmmaker, an obviously contradictory exercise, but not necessarily a hypocritical one. There is plenty of nudity in Auto Focus, but you can always glimpse the abyss behind the undulating bodies, and the director leads you from easy titillation to suffocating dread, pausing only briefly and cautiously to consider the possibility of pleasure."

Roger Ebert of the Chicago Sun-Times gave the film four out of four stars, calling it "a hypnotic portrait ... pitch-perfect in its decor, music, clothes, cars, language and values ... Greg Kinnear gives a creepy, brilliant performance as a man lacking in all insight ... Crane was not a complex man, but that should not blind us to the subtlety and complexity of Kinnear's performance."

Edward Guthmann of the San Francisco Chronicle called it "a compelling, sympathetic portrait ... Kinnear undercuts the seaminess of the Crane story, and shows us a man with more dimension and complexity than his behavior might suggest."

Peter Travers of Rolling Stone awarded it three and a half out of four stars and added, "Schrader, the writer of Taxi Driver and the director of American Gigolo, is a poet of male sexual pathology. Shot through with profane laughs and stinging drama, Auto Focus ranks with his best films."

Todd McCarthy of Variety called it "one of director Paul Schrader's best films, and like Boogie Nights ranks as a shrewd exposé of recent Hollywood's slimy underside ... Schrader directs with a very smooth hand, providing a good-natured and frequently amusing spin to eventually grim material that aptly reflects the protagonist's almost unfailing good humor ... Pic overall has an excellent period in Los Angeles feel without getting elaborate about it, and musical contributions by Angelo Badalamenti and a host of pop tunes are tops."

=== Criticism by Scotty Crane ===
One of Bob Crane's sons, Scotty, bitterly attacked the film as being inaccurate. In an October 2002 article, Scotty said that his father was not a regular church-goer and had only been to church three times in the last dozen years of his life, including his own funeral. There is no evidence that Crane engaged in S&M, and director Paul Schrader told Scotty that the S&M scene was based on Schrader's own personal experience. Scotty claims that his father and John Carpenter did not become close friends who socialized together until 1975, and that Crane was already a sex addict and had recorded his sexual encounters since 1956, long before he became famous.

Scotty and his mother had written their own script for a film biography on Crane. The spec script, alternately titled "F-Stop" and "Take Off Your Clothes and Smile", was written up in Variety by columnist Army Archerd, but after Auto-Focus was announced, interest in Scotty's script ceased.

=== Awards and nominations ===
Paul Schrader was nominated for the Golden Seashell at the San Sebastián International Film Festival. Willem Dafoe was nominated for Best Supporting Actor by the Chicago Film Critics Association but lost to Dennis Quaid for Far from Heaven.

=== Home media ===
The DVD release includes a 50-minute documentary, Murder in Scottsdale, which delves into the initial murder investigation and the reopening of the case some 15 years later. The DVD also features several audio commentary tracks.
