= Chicago Film Critics Association Award for Best Supporting Actor =

American film award

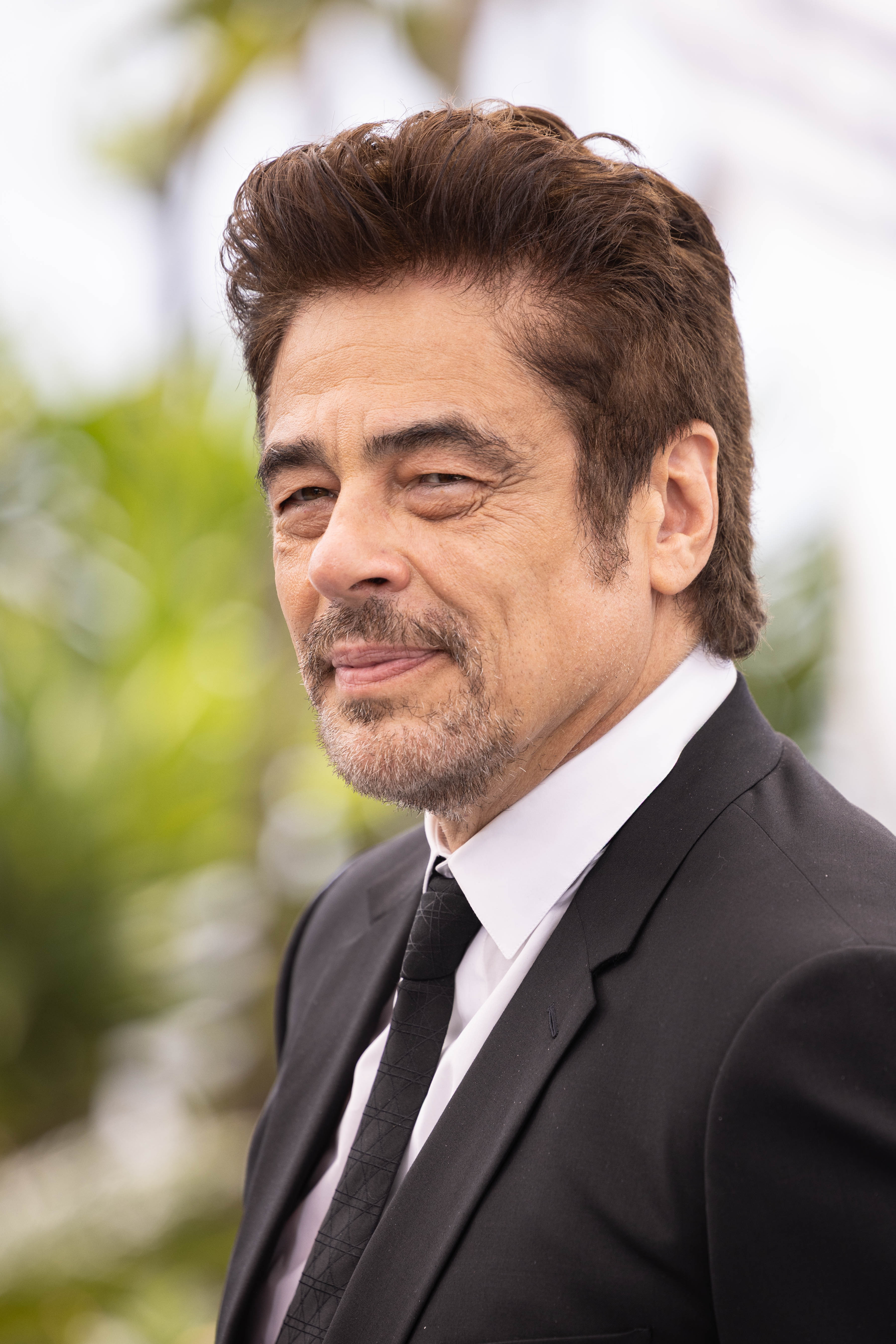
- The 2000, 2015 & 2025 recipient: Benicio del Toro
- Awarded for: Best Performance by an Actor in a Supporting Role
- Country: United States
- Presented by: Chicago Film Critics Association
- First award: Martin Landau; Tucker: The Man and His Dream (1988)
- Currently held by: Benicio del Toro; One Battle After Another (2025)
- Website: www.chicagofilmcritics.org

The Chicago Film Critics Association Award for Best Supporting Actor is an annual award given by the Chicago Film Critics Association.

== Winners ==
=== 1980s ===
Year	Winner and nominees	Film	Role
1988	Martin Landau	Tucker: The Man and His Dream	Abe Karatz
1989	Danny Aiello	Do the Right Thing	Sal
1989	Marlon Brando	A Dry White Season	Joe Bella
1989	Morgan Freeman	Glory	Sergeant Major John Rawlins
1989	John Goodman	Sea of Love	Det. Sherman Touhey
1989	Lance Henriksen	Johnny Handsome	Rafe Garrett
1989	Jack Nicholson	Batman	Jack Napier / The Joker
1989	Denzel Washington	Glory	Private Silas Trip

=== 1990s ===
Year	Winner and nominees	Film	Role
1990	Joe Pesci	Goodfellas	Tommy DeVito
1991	Harvey Keitel	Bugsy	Mickey Cohen
1991	Danny Aiello	Once Around	Joe Bella
1991	Ice Cube	Boyz n the Hood	Darrin "Doughboy" Baker
1991	Laurence Fishburne	Boyz n the Hood	Furious Styles
1991	John Goodman	Barton Fink	Charlie Meadows
1991	Samuel L. Jackson	Jungle Fever	"Gator" Purify
1991	Michael Lerner	Barton Fink	Jack Lipnick
1991	Jack Palance	City Slickers	Curly Washburn
1991	Alan Rickman	Robin Hood: Prince of Thieves	Sheriff of Nottingham
1992	Jack Nicholson	A Few Good Men	Colonel Nathan Jessup
1992	Al Freeman Jr.	Malcolm X	Elijah Muhammad
1992	Jeff Goldblum	Deep Cover	David Jason
1992	Gene Hackman	Unforgiven	Little Bill Daggett
1992	Al Pacino	Glengarry Glen Ross	Ricky Roma
1993	Ralph Fiennes	Schindler's List	Amon Göth
1993	Jeff Daniels	Gettysburg	Colonel Joshua Chamberlain
1993	Tommy Lee Jones	The Fugitive	Marshal Samuel Gerard
1993	John Malkovich	In the Line of Fire	Mitch Leary
1993	Sean Penn	Carlito's Way	David Kleinfeld
1994	Martin Landau	Ed Wood	Bela Lugosi
1994	Morgan Freeman	The Shawshank Redemption	Ellis Boyd "Red" Redding
1994	Anthony Hopkins	The Road to Wellville	Dr. John Harvey Kellogg
1994	Chazz Palminteri	Bullets Over Broadway	Cheech
1994	Gary Sinise	Forrest Gump	Lt. Dan Taylor
1994	John Turturro	Quiz Show	Herb Stempel
1995	Kevin Spacey	The Usual Suspects	Roger "Verbal" Kint
1995	Don Cheadle	Devil in a Blue Dress	Mouse Alexander
1995	Gene Hackman	Get Shorty	Harry Zimm
1995	Ed Harris	Apollo 13	Gene Kranz
1995	Delroy Lindo	Clockers	Rodney Little
1996	Cuba Gooding Jr.	Jerry Maguire	Rod Tidwell
1996	Steve Buscemi	Fargo	Carl Showalter
1996	Nathan Lane	The Birdcage	Albert Goldman
1996	Edward Norton	Primal Fear	Aaron Stampler
1996	James Woods	Ghosts of Mississippi	Byron De La Beckwith
1997	Burt Reynolds	Boogie Nights	Jack Horner
1997	Robert Forster	Jackie Brown	Max Cherry
1997	Anthony Hopkins	Amistad	John Quincy Adams
1997	Greg Kinnear	As Good as It Gets	Simon Bishop
1997	Kevin Spacey	L.A. Confidential	Det. Sgt. Jack Vincennes
1998	Billy Bob Thornton	A Simple Plan	Jacob Mitchell
1998	Michael Caine	Little Voice	Ray Say
1998	Robert Duvall	A Civil Action	Jerome Facher
1998	Bill Murray	Rushmore	Herman Blume
1998	Nick Nolte	The Thin Red Line	Lt. Col. Gordon Tall
1999	Tom Cruise	Magnolia	Frank T.J. Mackey
1999	Michael Clarke Duncan	The Green Mile	John Coffey
1999	John Malkovich	Being John Malkovich	John Horatio Malkovich
1999	Haley Joel Osment	The Sixth Sense	Cole Sear
1999	Christopher Plummer	The Insider	Mike Wallace

=== 2000s ===
Year	Winner and nominees	Film	Role
2000	Benicio del Toro	Traffic	Javier Rodriguez
2000	Jack Black	High Fidelity	Barry
2000	Willem Dafoe	Shadow of the Vampire	Max Schreck
2000	Albert Finney	Erin Brockovich	Edward L. Masry
2000	Philip Seymour Hoffman	Almost Famous	Lester Bangs
2001	Steve Buscemi	Ghost World	Seymour
2001	Ben Kingsley	Sexy Beast	Don Logan
2001	Jude Law	A.I. Artificial Intelligence	Gigolo Joe
2001	Tony Shalhoub	The Man Who Wasn't There	Freddy Riedenschneider
2001	Jon Voight	Ali	Howard Cosell
2002	Dennis Quaid	Far from Heaven	Frank Whitaker
2002	Chris Cooper	Adaptation	John Laroche
2002	Willem Dafoe	Auto Focus	John Henry Carpenter
2002	Alfred Molina	Frida	Diego Rivera
2002	Paul Newman	Road to Perdition	John Rooney
2003	Tim Robbins	Mystic River	Dave Boyle
2003	Sean Astin	The Lord of the Rings: The Return of the King	Samwise Gamgee
2003	Alec Baldwin	The Cooler	Shelly Kaplow
2003	Benicio del Toro	21 Grams	Jack Jordan
2003	Peter Sarsgaard	Shattered Glass	Chuck Lane
2003	Andy Serkis	The Lord of the Rings: The Return of the King	Sméagol/Gollum
2004	Thomas Haden Church	Sideways	Jack
2005	Mickey Rourke	Sin City	Marv
2005	Matt Dillon	Crash	Officer John Ryan
2005	Terrence Howard	Crash	Cameron Thayer
2005	Paul Giamatti	Cinderella Man	Joe Gould
2005	Jake Gyllenhaal	Brokeback Mountain	Jack Twist
2005	Donald Sutherland	Pride & Prejudice	Mr. Bennet
2006	Jackie Earle Haley	Little Children	Ronald J. McGorvey
2006	Ben Affleck	Hollywoodland	George Reeves
2006	Eddie Murphy	Dreamgirls	James "Thunder" Early
2006	Jack Nicholson	The Departed	Frank Costello
2006	Brad Pitt	Babel	Richard Jones
2006	Michael Sheen	The Queen	Tony Blair
2007	Javier Bardem	No Country for Old Men	Anton Chigurh
2007	Casey Affleck	The Assassination of Jesse James by the Coward Robert Ford	Robert Ford
2007	Philip Seymour Hoffman	Charlie Wilson's War	Gust Avrakotos
2007	Hal Holbrook	Into the Wild	Ron Franz
2007	Tom Wilkinson	Michael Clayton	Arthur Edens
2008	Heath Ledger (posthumous)	The Dark Knight	The Joker
2008	Robert Downey Jr.	Tropic Thunder	Kirk Lazarus
2008	Philip Seymour Hoffman	Doubt	Father Brendan Flynn
2008	Bill Irwin	Rachel Getting Married	Paul
2008	Michael Shannon	Revolutionary Road	John Givings, Jr.
2009	Christoph Waltz	Inglourious Basterds	Col. Hans Landa
2009	Peter Capaldi	In the Loop	Malcolm Tucker
2009	Woody Harrelson	The Messenger	Capt. Tony Stone
2009	Christian McKay	Me and Orson Welles	Orson Welles
2009	Stanley Tucci	The Lovely Bones	George Harvey

=== 2010s ===
Year	Winner and nominees	Film	Role
2010	Christian Bale	The Fighter	Dicky Eklund
2010	Andrew Garfield	The Social Network	Eduardo Saverin
2010	John Hawkes	Winter's Bone	Teardrop Dolly
2010	Mark Ruffalo	The Kids Are All Right	Paul Hatfield
2010	Geoffrey Rush	The King's Speech	Lionel Logue
2011	Albert Brooks	Drive	Bernie Rose
2011	Nick Nolte	Warrior	Paddy Conlon
2011	Patton Oswalt	Young Adult	Matt Freehauf
2011	Brad Pitt	The Tree of Life	Mr. O'Brien
2011	Christopher Plummer	Beginners	Hal Fields
2012	Philip Seymour Hoffman	The Master	Lancaster Dodd
2012	Jason Clarke	Zero Dark Thirty	Dan
2012	Leonardo DiCaprio	Django Unchained	Calvin Candie
2012	Dwight Henry	Beasts of the Southern Wild	Wink
2012	Tommy Lee Jones	Lincoln	Thaddeus Stevens
2013	Jared Leto	Dallas Buyers Club	Rayon
2013	Barkhad Abdi	Captain Phillips	Abduwali Muse
2013	Michael Fassbender	12 Years a Slave	Edwin Epps
2013	James Franco	Spring Breakers	Alien
2013	James Gandolfini	Enough Said	Albert
2014	J. K. Simmons	Whiplash	Terence Fletcher
2014	Josh Brolin	Inherent Vice	Lt. Det. Christian "Bigfoot" Bjornsen
2014	Ethan Hawke	Boyhood	Mason Evans, Sr.
2014	Edward Norton	Birdman	Mike Shiner
2014	Mark Ruffalo	Foxcatcher	Dave Schultz
2015	Benicio Del Toro	Sicario	Alejandro
2015	Sam Elliott	Grandma	Karl
2015	Mark Rylance	Bridge of Spies	Rudolf Abel
2015	Michael Shannon	99 Homes	Rick Carver
2015	Sylvester Stallone	Creed	Rocky Balboa
2016	Mahershala Ali	Moonlight	Juan
2016	Alden Ehrenreich	Hail, Caesar!	Hobie Doyle
2016	Ben Foster	Hell or High Water	Tanner Howard
2016	Lucas Hedges	Manchester by the Sea	Patrick Chandler
2016	Trevante Rhodes	Moonlight	Chiron/"Black"
2016	Michael Shannon	Nocturnal Animals	Detective Bobby Andes
2017	Willem Dafoe	The Florida Project	Bobby Hicks
2017	Armie Hammer	Call Me by Your Name	Oliver
2017	Jason Mitchell	Mudbound	Ronsel Jackson
2017	Sam Rockwell	Three Billboards Outside Ebbing, Missouri	Jason Dixon
2017	Michael Stuhlbarg	Call Me by Your Name	Mr. Perlman
2018	Richard E. Grant	Can You Ever Forgive Me?	Jack Hock
2018	Mahershala Ali	Green Book	Dr. Don Shirley
2018	Timothée Chalamet	Beautiful Boy	Nic Scheff
2018	Michael B. Jordan	Black Panther	Erik Killmonger
2018	Steven Yeun	Burning	Ben
2019	Brad Pitt	Once Upon a Time in Hollywood	Cliff Booth
2019	Tom Hanks	A Beautiful Day in the Neighborhood	Fred Rogers
2019	Shia LaBeouf	Honey Boy	James Lort
2019	Al Pacino	The Irishman	Jimmy Hoffa
2019	Joe Pesci	The Irishman	Russell Bufalino

=== 2020s ===
Year	Winner and nominees	Film	Role
2020	Paul Raci	Sound of Metal	Joe
2020	Chadwick Boseman	Da 5 Bloods	"Stormin'" Norman Earl Holloway
2020	Bill Murray	On the Rocks	Felix Keane
2020	Leslie Odom Jr.	One Night in Miami...	Sam Cooke
2020	David Strathairn	Nomadland	David
2021	Kodi Smit-McPhee	The Power of the Dog	Peter Gordon
2021	Bradley Cooper	Licorice Pizza	Jon Peters
2021	Colman Domingo	Zola	Abegunde “X” Olawale
2021	Mike Faist	West Side Story	Riff
2021	Jeffrey Wright	The French Dispatch	Roebuck Wright
2022	Ke Huy Quan	Everything Everywhere All at Once	Waymond Wang
2022	Brendan Gleeson	The Banshees of Inisherin	Colm Doherty
2022	Brian Tyree Henry	Causeway	James Aucoin
2022	Barry Keoghan	The Banshees of Inisherin	Dominic Kearney
2022	Mark Rylance	Bones and All	Sully
2023	Charles Melton	May December	Joe Yoo
2023	Robert Downey Jr.	Oppenheimer	Lewis Strauss
2023	Ryan Gosling	Barbie	Ken
2023	Glenn Howerton	BlackBerry	Jim Balsillie
2023	Mark Ruffalo	Poor Things	Duncan Wedderburn
2024	Kieran Culkin	A Real Pain	Benji Kaplan
2024	Yura Borisov	Anora	Igor
2024	Clarence Maclin	Sing Sing	Himself
2024	Guy Pearce	The Brutalist	Harrison Lee Van Buren
2024	Adam Pearson	A Different Man	Oswald
2025	Benicio del Toro	One Battle After Another	Sergio St. Carlos
2025	Jacob Elordi	Frankenstein	The Creature
2025	Delroy Lindo	Sinners	Delta Slim
2025	Sean Penn	One Battle After Another	Col. Steven J. Lockjaw
2025	Stellan Skarsgård	Sentimental Value	Gustav Borg
