= List of Hogan's Heroes characters =

List of characters from the American television series Hogan's Heroes

The following is a list of characters from Hogan's Heroes, an American sitcom television series that ran on the CBS television network for 168 episodes over six seasons from September 17, 1965 to April 4, 1971.

== Main ==
=== Colonel Hogan ===
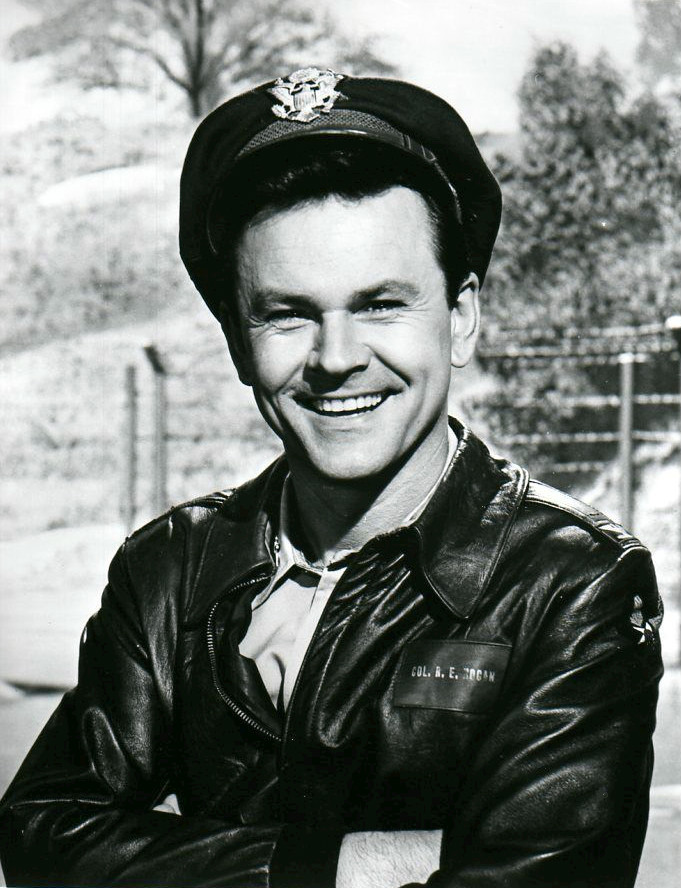
Bob Crane as Colonel Hogan

United States Army Air Forces Colonel Robert E. Hogan (portrayed by Bob Crane) is the main protagonist of the series. Hogan is the senior officer of the prisoners of war at Stalag 13, and leads a group who secretly sabotage the German war effort and help allies to escape Germany. Hogan commanded the 504th Bombardment Group, and was shot down and captured during a raid on Hamburg when Luftwaffe Colonel Albert Biedenbender guessed Hogan's plan and developed a successful defense. Hogan graduated third in his military class, and seems to thrive on difficult if not impossible missions. He was described by Biedenbender as having "a flair for the overcomplex" because of the complicated details of his plans.

Due to Hogan's care in planning operations, the skill of his staff, and Hogan's success at manipulating Klink and Schultz, Hogan's team is usually successful. Throughout the show, Hogan impersonates German officers, typically using aliases derived from his own name, such as "Hoganschmidt." He is a ladies' man, engaging in relationships with Klink's secretaries, Helga and Hilda, as well as many of the civilian women with whom he comes into contact. In "The Ultimate Weapon" he even becomes romantically involved with a female SS officer.

Hogan's men are extremely loyal to their commander, as he is to them. In "Two Nazis for the Price of One", Hogan and his men are ordered back to London after their operations become known to a Gestapo general. When circumstances force Hogan to stay behind, the men elect to remain with him, which visibly touches Hogan. Newkirk once disobeyed orders to keep the team's activities secret and explained them to an Allied general who had chastised Hogan for appearing to cooperate with the Nazis ("The General Swap"). When a British general praises Hogan's war efforts, Hogan is quick to state that he "has a good crew", crediting the men with the team's successes ("D-Day at Stalag 13").

The character was named after the actor Robert Hogan by friend and series creator Bernard Fein; Hogan actually appeared in two episodes of the show.

=== Colonel Klink ===
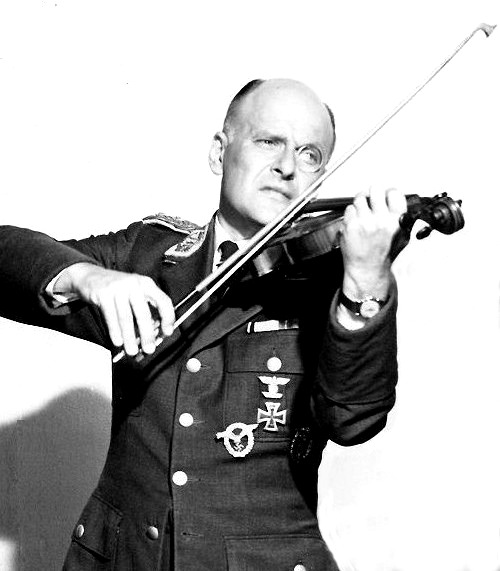
Werner Klemperer as Col. Klink

Kommandant Oberst (Colonel) Wilhelm Klink (portrayed by Werner Klemperer) is an old-line Luftwaffe officer of Prussian descent. He is officious, gullible, cowardly, vain, inept, and often clueless. He is a veteran aviator of the First World War and can be seen wearing an Iron Cross First Class, along with the 1939 clasp for a second award (spange), Ground Assault Badge of the Luftwaffe, and the Pilot's Badge. The first class Iron Cross implies that he has also earned both the Iron Cross Second Class and the Honor Cross for service in World War I.

After failing his entrance exams for law or medical school, he received an appointment to a military academy and graduated 95th in his class. Stuck at the rank of colonel for twenty years with an efficiency rating "a few points above miserable", he is the only member of his class still in the Luftwaffe who has not risen to the rank of general. As far as the Wehrmacht knows, no prisoner has ever escaped Stalag 13 during Klink's command, a record he frequently touts. Klink always wears a monocle on his left eye and often carries a riding crop. Klink is, for the most part, portrayed as a cowardly and muddling career officer rather than a stereotypical evil German or ardent Nazi. Klink is easily manipulated by Hogan through a combination of flattery, chicanery, and playing on Klink's fear of being sent to the Russian Front or being arrested by the Gestapo. Although Klink tries to keep their relationship at arm's length, he appears to genuinely like Hogan and frequently seeks his advice when faced with professional and personal challenges, which Hogan typically uses as an opportunity to help the Allied cause. Klink is an enthusiastic but untalented violinist.

Klemperer reprised his role as Colonel Klink outside of the series twice: once in a cameo in a 1966 episode of Batman, and again in a 1993 episode of The Simpsons:

- In the Batman episode, Klink had a window climb cameo where he tells Batman and Robin that he is looking for an underground agent in Gotham City.
- In the episode of The Simpsons, an unconscious Homer Simpson's guardian angel assumes the form of someone Homer would revere, trying first Sir Isaac Newton, with whom Homer is unfamiliar, then Klink. During their conversation, Homer reveals the truth of Hogan's operations to a surprised Klink.

=== Sergeant Schultz ===
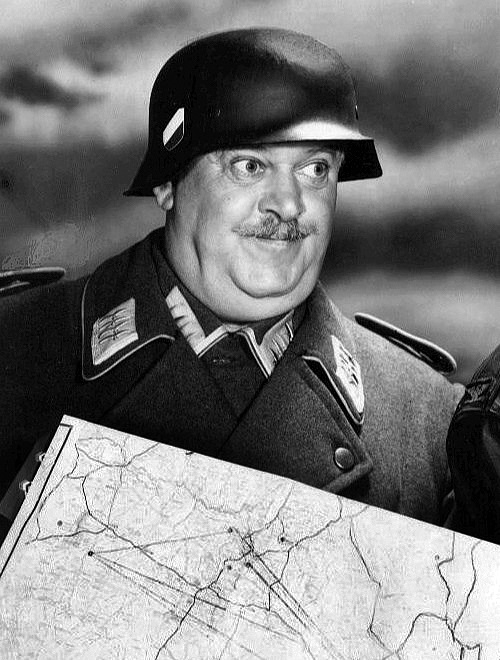
John Banner as Schultz

Sergeant Hans Schultz (portrayed by John Banner) is Klink's portly, inept, clumsy, dim-witted, yet affable Oberfeldwebel (equivalent to master sergeant during World War II) of the guard. He displays two stripes at the cuffs of his tunic sleeves indicating the rank of Hauptfeldwebel, which is the equivalent of a company first sergeant with the same pay grade as Oberfeldwebel; he wears a fictitious version of the Iron Cross (4th Grade). Schultz also has three other decorations from World War I (including the Wound Badge).

Timid and cowardly, Schultz seeks to avoid trouble at all costs. He generally prefers to ignore the prisoners' suspicious activities, a desire he expresses with his catchphrase, "I know (see, hear) nothing!" Hogan and his crew often openly discuss and even carry out their plots in Schultz's presence. They usually convince him to ignore and sometimes even assist them in their operations, either by bribing him (usually with chocolate bars or LeBeau's gourmet cooking) or pointing out how he could be implicated if he reports them to Klink. Schultz carries a Krag-Jørgensen rifle, although he never keeps it loaded, and tends to misplace it and often hands it to a prisoner when he is distracted.

Schultz seems ambivalent to the German war effort, once stating that, "In war, I do not like to take sides", and "Things were so much happier here when we had an emperor." Like Klink, Schultz is a veteran of World War I. In the episode "War Takes a Holiday", he says that in civilian life he was the owner of Germany's largest toy manufacturing company, however in other episodes he says that he is "a poor man." His claims of poverty are backed up by the fact that he is frequently short of money, even to the point of borrowing from the prisoners. He has a wife and five children, whom he sees only on infrequent leaves. He is apparently unfaithful, as he is sometimes seen dating women from the nearby town of Hammelburg, who usually turn out to be either underground agents assisting Hogan and his men or undercover Gestapo agents. Schultz is an enthusiastic but unsuccessful gambler, and above all loves to eat, especially LeBeau's gourmet cooking.

=== Corporal LeBeau ===
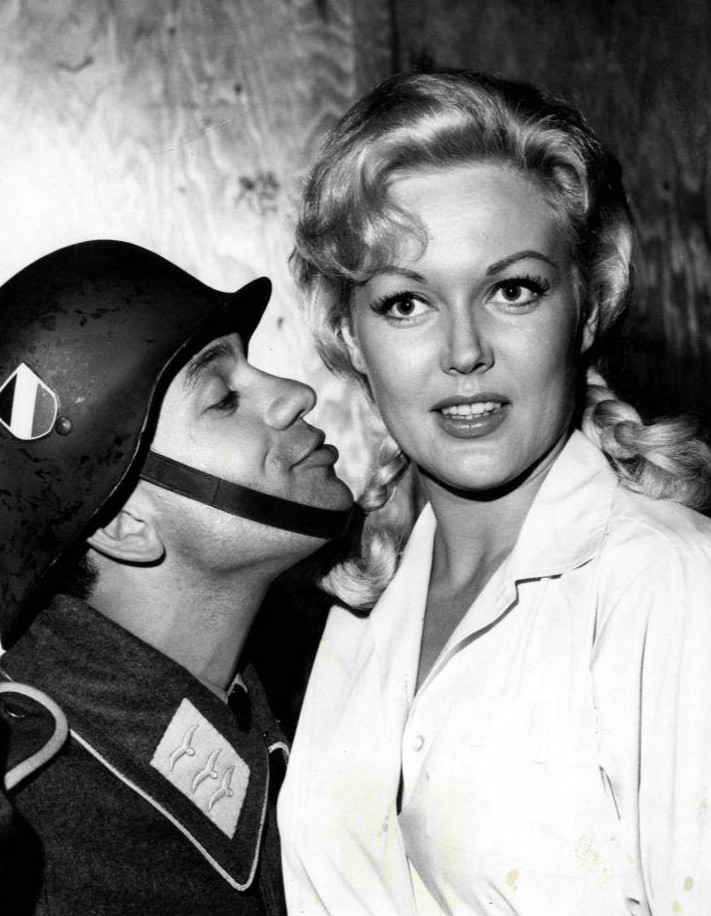
Robert Clary as LeBeau and Cynthia Lynn as Fräulein Helga

Free French Air Force Corporal Louis LeBeau (portrayed by Robert Clary) is a skilled chef and occasional tailor. He is passionate about his cooking and patriotism for France. LeBeau frequently uses his culinary skills to impress Klink's guests, and Hogan uses LeBeau's culinary prowess to gain access to Klink's guests at dinners or banquets. LeBeau is also frequently seen bribing Schultz with food for information. He is friendly with the camp's guard dogs, which makes it possible to use a hidden tunnel entrance located under a doghouse in the kennel. Though claustrophobic, due to his diminutive stature he sometime facilitates Hogan's operations by hiding in small spaces, such as the safe in Colonel Klink's office, boxes, crates, or a dumbwaiter. Because of his size, both Schultz and Klink frequently refer to LeBeau as "the cockroach".

In one first-season episode, LeBeau mentions being married, but except for that one instance it is never referenced again. When Lebeau and Marya flirt on several occasions, he expresses a desire to marry her. LeBeau is portrayed as a stereotypical Frenchman, attracted to most of the beautiful women with whom he comes in contact.

Actor Robert Clary was a French Jew and Holocaust survivor who was held in the Ottmuth and Buchenwald concentration camps during the Second World War. Clary was the last surviving member of the original cast of Hogan's Heroes; he died on November 16, 2022, at the age of 96.

=== Corporal Newkirk ===
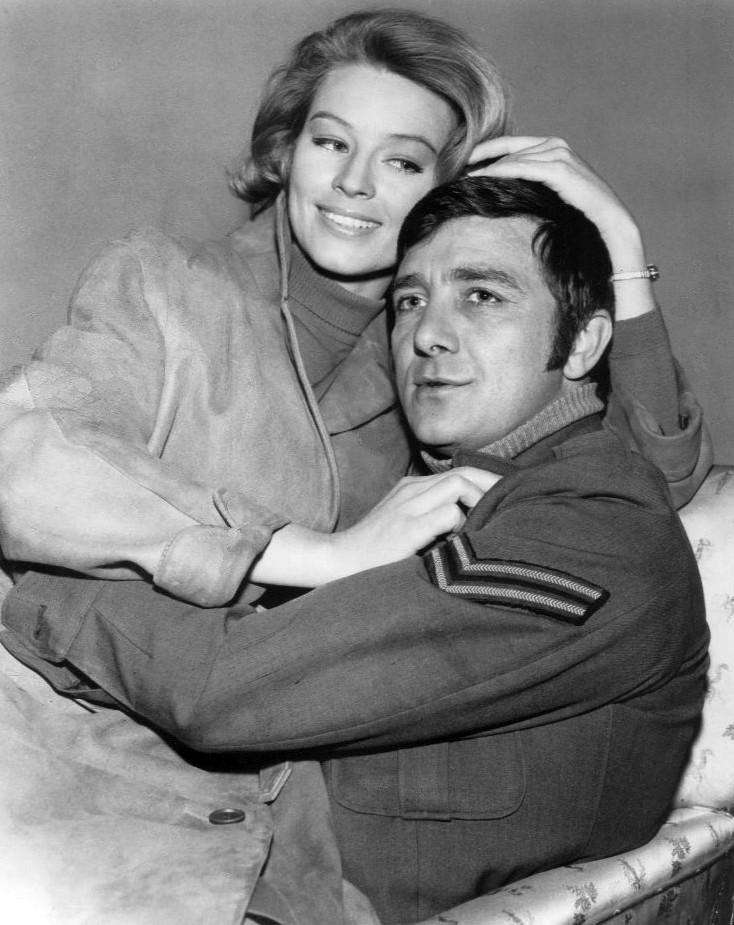
Richard Dawson as Newkirk alongside guest star Ulla Strömstedt

Royal Air Force Corporal Peter Newkirk (portrayed by Richard Dawson) had been a magician in civilian life. He uses his skills as a pick-pocket, forger, lock picker, and safe cracker on many occasions, particularly to forge Klink's signature or open the safe in Klink's office. As a card shark, Newkirk gambles with Schultz to learn secret information. He is also a skilled tailor, in charge of making or altering uniforms, civilian clothes, and other disguises as needed for missions or for prisoners to move out of Germany. He is often teamed with Carter in operations, and sometimes quarrels with LeBeau over English and French cultural differences.

Newkirk is an excellent mimic and does numerous impersonations; he often impersonates German officers and can imitate the voices of Adolf Hitler and Winston Churchill, as well as celebrities, such as Humphrey Bogart. Newkirk is a ladies' man, and often tries to initiate romance with the women who appear in the series.

Often the British voices heard on the radio as being from "London" were done by Richard Dawson, using a different, more "posh", accent than the one he used for Newkirk. Dawson had originally proposed using a Liverpool accent for Newkirk, but the producers rejected the idea.

=== Sergeant Kinchloe ===
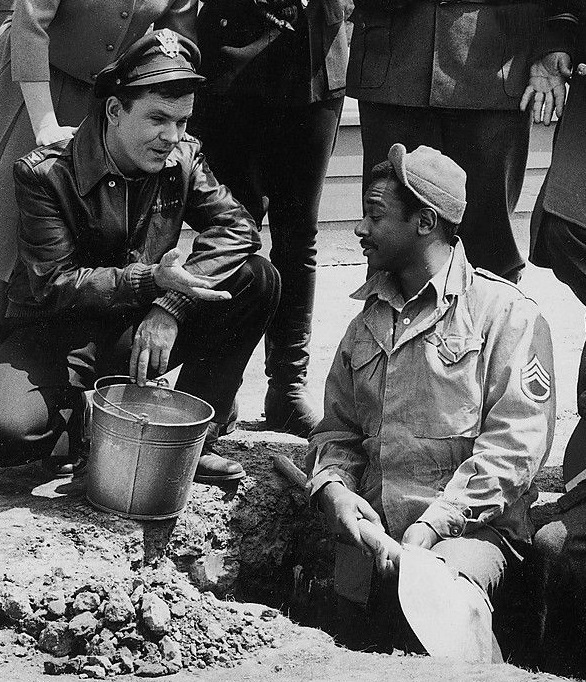
Ivan Dixon as Kinchloe, with Bob Crane as Col. Hogan

United States Army Air Forces Staff Sergeant James "Kinch" Kinchloe (portrayed by Ivan Dixon) is primarily responsible for radio, telephone, and other forms of electronic communications. In many episodes Kinch acts as the de facto second-in-command in Hogan's crew; it was notable for a 1960s television show to have an African-American actor identified in such a manner.

A talented mimic, Kinchloe easily imitates German officers speaking over the radio or telephone. Kinch is from Detroit, where he worked for the telephone company before the war. Kinch was also a boxer, having fought in Golden Gloves matches as a middleweight; because of this experience, in one episode he is recruited to fight a guard from Stalag 13. Kinchloe has remarkable ability when participating in undercover activities, but due to his skin color, his roles outside of the camp are limited.

Ivan Dixon left the series after the fifth season and was replaced in the cast by Kenneth Washington. No mention was made on-screen of Kinchloe's departure from Stalag 13 and his role as radio operator was filled by Sgt. Baker, while Newkirk became Hogan's second-in-command.

=== Sergeant Carter ===
Larry Hovis as Sgt. Carter

United States Army Air Forces Technical Sergeant Andrew J. Carter (portrayed by Larry Hovis) is an explosives expert in charge of ordnance and bomb-making. Prior to the war, Carter was a Boy Scout who had run a drug store in Muncie, Indiana. Although Carter is technically the ranking non-commissioned officer, he is never shown to exercise any authority.

Carter is often called upon to impersonate high ranking German officers and officials, including Adolf Hitler, to whom he bears a striking resemblance.

Carter references his fiancée Mary Jane, whom he expects to marry after the war. Unlike the rest of the men, he is shown to be shy around women, and Newkirk and LeBeau often joke about his naïveté. He is from the fictional town of Bullfrog, North Dakota, and is revealed to be part Native American, when he receives a letter from one of his Sioux relatives. Hovis did not want to remove his wedding ring to play the character, so to conceal it, Carter wears gloves in most of his appearances. In the few episodes in which he is gloveless, Carter's left hand is visible only briefly.

In the pilot episode, "The Informer", Carter is a lieutenant who escaped from another prisoner-of-war camp, staying at Stalag 13 before continuing his journey to England. By the second episode, Carter has a different rank and is a permanent member of Hogan's crew. This cast change occurred after Leonid Kinskey, who played Russian Sergeant Vladimir Minsk in the pilot, declined to return for further episodes.

=== Sergeant Baker ===
Sergeant Richard Baker (portrayed by Kenneth Washington) is an African-American radio expert. Following Kinchloe's departure at the end of the fifth season, Newkirk succeeds him as Hogan's second-in-command. Baker takes over Kinchloe's role as radio operator and manager of the underground communications center. Washington died in July, 2025 and was the last surviving regular cast member of Hogan's Heroes.

== Recurring ==
=== Fräulein Helga ===
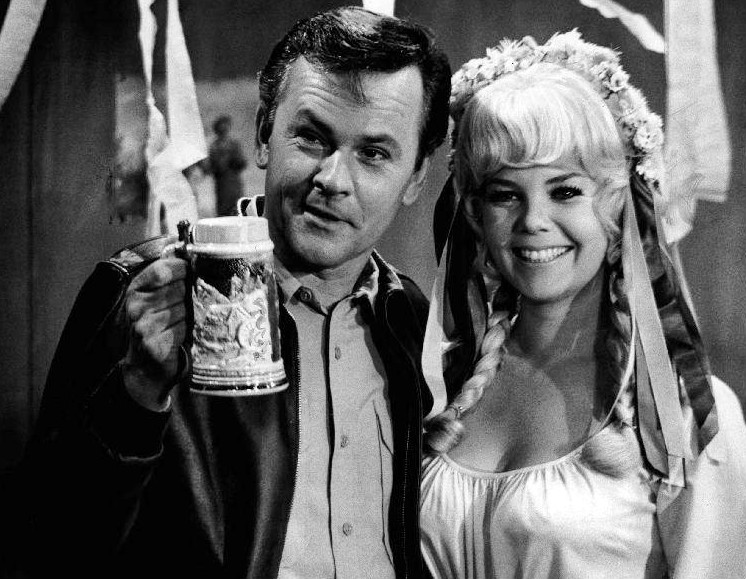
Sigrid Valdis as Fräulein Hilda with Crane as Hogan

Fräulein Helga (portrayed by Cynthia Lynn in season 1) was Klink's first secretary. She was pro-Allies, having assisted Hogan and his men in their operations, such as providing verification for Hogan's statements when he tries to manipulate Klink, or stealing documents to pass on to Hogan. Helga had a flirtatious personal relationship with Hogan, and was clearly smitten with him. In the pilot episode, Helga works as a manicurist in the prisoners' underground barber shop, but this is the only scene in the series that shows her cooperation as that extensive. Lynn left Hogan's Heroes at the end of its first season, because her off-screen relationship with Bob Crane was causing trouble in her marriage. Helga's departure was never explained in the series. Lynn later made two guest appearances as other characters.

=== Fräulein Hilda ===
Fräulein Hilda (portrayed by Sigrid Valdis in seasons 2–6) replaced Helga as Klink's secretary. Her role is very similar to Helga's, aiding the prisoners by providing information to Hogan and confirming details of the stories he tells Klink. Hilda's relationship with Hogan seems to go beyond flirtation, since they are occasionally seen meeting in Klink's car, and in "Top Secret Top Coat", she jokes that he should pay for her help with an engagement ring. Valdis appeared on the series once in a minor role prior to being cast as Hilda. Valdis and Bob Crane were married on the show's set in 1970. Most of the cast and crew were present and Richard Dawson served as Crane's best man.

=== General Albert Burkhalter ===
General Albert Burkhalter (portrayed by Leon Askin) is Klink's superior officer, and is in charge of Luftwaffe prison camps. His rank is equivalent to a lieutenant (three-star) general in the American forces. Burkhalter is domineering, irritable, and treats Klink with open contempt, frequently stopping Klink's nervous babbling with "Shut up, Klink!" He regularly threatens to send Klink to the Russian Front or have him shot. Burkhalter is mystified by Stalag 13's perfect record, unable to make sense of it in contrast with Klink's apparent incompetence. Burkhalter fears his wife; after Hogan arranges to obtain blackmail photos of him with another woman, Burkhalter frantically agrees to do whatever is necessary to prevent her from finding out. Like Klink, Burkhalter depends on Hogan's explanations to get him out of trouble with the high command when Hogan's plots result in German failures. In the pilot episode, Burkhalter was portrayed as a colonel.

=== Major Wolfgang Hochstetter ===
Major Wolfgang Hochstetter (portrayed by Howard Caine) is a zealous, hot-tempered Gestapo major (Sturmbannführer). Unlike most of the other German characters, he references being a long-time Nazi Party member, having joined in 1931. Although Hochstetter is a member of the Gestapo, he wears an SS uniform. Hochstetter often arrives at Stalag 13 to investigate Klink or one of Klink's visitors. Given the high rate of sabotage near the camp, Hochstetter is highly suspicious of Hogan and comes to regard him as "the most dangerous man in all Germany." Hochstetter's position in the Gestapo makes Klink clearly fearful of him, while Burkhalter, who openly despises Hochstetter, is not and frequently insults him. Although Hochstetter is suspicious and distrustful of Hogan, like Klink and Burkhalter, he fails to notice how he himself is manipulated by Hogan. Whenever one of Hogan's schemes results in another German disaster, Hochstetter always accepts Hogan's advice about what to tell his superiors in Berlin in order to save his own skin.

Before being cast as Hochstetter, Howard Caine appeared as two other German officers, artillery officer Major Keitel, and Gestapo Colonel Feldkamp.

=== Colonel Rodney Crittendon ===
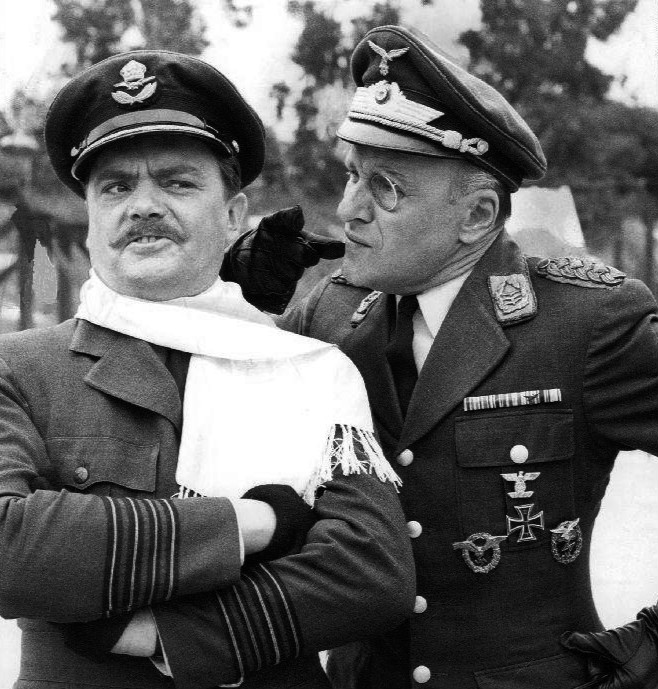
Bernard Fox as Colonel Crittendon, alongside Klemperer as Klink

Colonel Rodney Crittendon (portrayed by Bernard Fox) is a Royal Air Force group captain. Since the United States military has no "group captain" rank, Crittendon was referred to as "colonel," the equivalent American rank, to avoid confusion for the show's American audience. He is dim-witted and dense, but full of enthusiasm. His date of rank is earlier than Hogan's, so he outranks Hogan, which invariably leads to disastrous results whenever he overrules Hogan. His medals include the Distinguished Service Order, Order of the British Empire, Military Cross and Bar, and the Distinguished Flying Cross and Bar. When Crittendon is first transferred to Stalag 13, Hogan poses him a "hypothetical" question, asking what he would do if he were aware the POWs were engaged in spying and sabotage; Crittendon replies that he would report them to the German authorities, because a POW's only job is to escape. He constantly tries to escape, but his attempts all fail due to his incompetence.

In later episodes, Crittendon is aware of Hogan's operations and tries to participate, much to Hogan's annoyance, since Crittendon is hopelessly inept and clumsy.

In the episode "Lady Chitterly's Lover," Fox played both Crittendon and British traitor Sir Charles Chitterly (a parody of William Joyce, known as Lord Haw-Haw), who stops at Stalag 13 with his wife Lady Leslie Chitterly while on their way to visit Adolf Hitler.

=== Marya ===
Marya Parmanova (portrayed by Nita Talbot) is a White Russian émigré spy whose work occasionally aligns with Hogan's. She often appears as the paramour of a high-ranking German officer or scientist. Her mission is to either discredit them or set them up for arrest, as she notes that "...We cannot trust Hitler to shoot all his own generals". She first meets Hogan and LeBeau in Paris during the second season, where she learns of their Stalag 13 activities. Her schemes often come into conflict with Hogan's, but their plans always turn out to be compatible. Marya constantly flirts with Hogan, and also with LeBeau. LeBeau is extremely infatuated with her and trusts her but Hogan is always wary of her. Klink is also suspicious of Marya, stating that trouble always ensues when she visits Stalag 13.

Following Kenneth Washington's death in July 2025, Talbot is the last living series regular or recurring actor from the Hogan's Heroes cast.

=== Tiger ===
- Tiger (portrayed by Arlene Martel) is the codename of French Underground agent, Marie Louise Monet, who collaborates with Hogan and has a recurring romantic relationship him. Hogan speaks of Tiger with great respect. He notes that she has saved his life "more than once", and he describes her as "The leader of the French Underground." Hogan frees Tiger from the Gestapo twice; once from Gestapo headquarters in Paris, and once from a train, as she is being taken to Berlin for trial. Tiger made her first appearance in one of the very first episodes of the series; Season one, episode two, "Hold That Tiger." Martel also played an unrelated underground agent named "Gretchen" in season 5, episode 10, "The Defector".

== Occasional ==
The following characters occasionally appear in this show.

- Oscar Schnitzer (portrayed by Walter Janowitz) is an elderly veterinarian and dog trainer who keeps Stalag 13 supplied with guard dogs. He is a member of the German underground resistance, and secretly in league with Hogan and his men. Schnitzer's truck is occasionally used for smuggling people in and out of camp (through the entrance under a doghouse), as the guards are too afraid of the dogs to look inside his truck.
- Captain Fritz Gruber (portrayed by Dick Wilson) is Klink's adjutant in "Don't Forget to Write", and becomes the new ruthless Kommandant of Stalag 13 after Klink mistakenly volunteers for the Russian Front. Because Gruber is hard-nosed and not easy to manipulate, the prisoners desperately want to get Klink back. Hogan orders three prisoners to escape and hide. When Gruber is unable to recapture them, Burkhalter orders Klink to find them, which he does with Hogan's aid. Burkhalter then replaces Gruber with Klink. Gruber appears in one scene each of two other episodes (with Hogan assuming his identity to visit the home of a general in the first of those episodes). In addition to Gruber, several other junior officers and capable NCOs are occasionally assigned to Klink's command, but Hogan always finds a way to get rid of them. Some sources give his first name as "Felix".
- Corporal Karl Langenscheidt (portrayed by Jon Cedar) is one of Schultz's guards. He is only seen or spoken of occasionally (mostly in the first-season episodes). He often arrives with poor timing, such as informing Klink that an important guest has arrived unannounced, much to Klink's displeasure. In "Art for Hogan's Sake", Langenscheidt gets involved in Hogan's scheme to forge the priceless Édouard Manet painting "The Fife Player", and switch it for the real one General Burkhalter had "requisitioned" from the Louvre in Paris to give to Hermann Göring as a birthday present.
- Frau Gertrude Linkmeyer (née Burkhalter) (portrayed four times by Kathleen Freeman, once by Alice Ghostley) is General Burkhalter's homely, overbearing sister. Her previous husband Otto is missing in action on the Russian Front and presumed dead. General Burkhalter suggests she marry Klink, much to the prospective groom's horror. Later in "Kommandant Gertrude", Frau Linkmeyer arrives at the camp with her new (and reluctant) fiancé, Major Wolfgang Karp (Lee Bergere), whom she intends to have replace Klink as Kommandant, but Hogan manages to foil her plans and their engagement.
- Lieutenant Maurice DuBois (portrayed by Felice Orlandi) is a French Underground contact who appeared in three episodes. Orlandi's real-life wife Alice Ghostley appeared in two episodes.

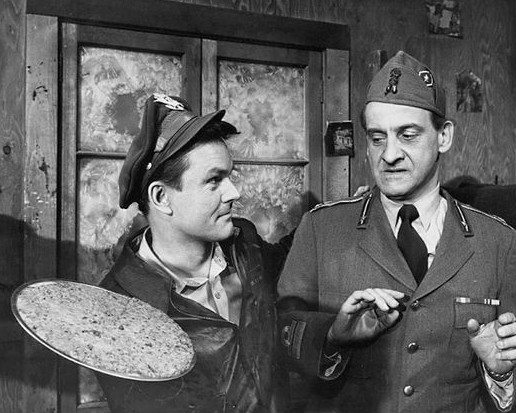
Hogan tries to convince Italian Major Bonacelli (Hans Conried) to help him.

- Major Bonacelli (portrayed by Hans Conried in the first appearance, Vito Scotti in the second appearance) is the commander of an Italian prisoner-of-war camp near the fictional city of Capezio. Bonacelli does not support the Fascist war effort, and attempts to desert to Switzerland in "The Pizza Parlor" under the guise of a trip to Stalag 13 to study Klink's operations. Hogan convinces him to instead return to his camp and act as an Allied spy. Bonacelli appears again in "The Return of Major Bonacelli," having traveled to Stalag 13 after he is discovered as an Allied agent. Hogan talks Bonacelli into photographing the new advanced German anti-aircraft gun before defecting to England, narrowly escaping capture by Hochstetter.
- Olsen (portrayed by Stewart Moss) was primarily used as a "stand-in" character when one of the actors from Hogan's four-member core team (Clary, Dawson, Dixon, Hovis) was unavailable for filming, yet the script required the presence of a 4-member core team.
- Addison, Broughton, Walters, and Slim (portrayed by Dick Ryan [Addison], Walter Smith [Broughton], Roy Goldman [Walters], and Dennis Troy [Slim]) are four prisoners in Hogan's barracks who serve as extras in crowd scenes and occasionally provide minor support for operations requiring more men than Hogan's core team. They appear in the majority of the show's episodes, but have almost no dialogue and are never listed in the credits. In one episode, Slim is described as the petty-theft specialist among the prisoners. Troy, who portrays Slim, also appears in multiple background roles as a guard or driver.
