= Patricia Harty =

American actress (born 1941)

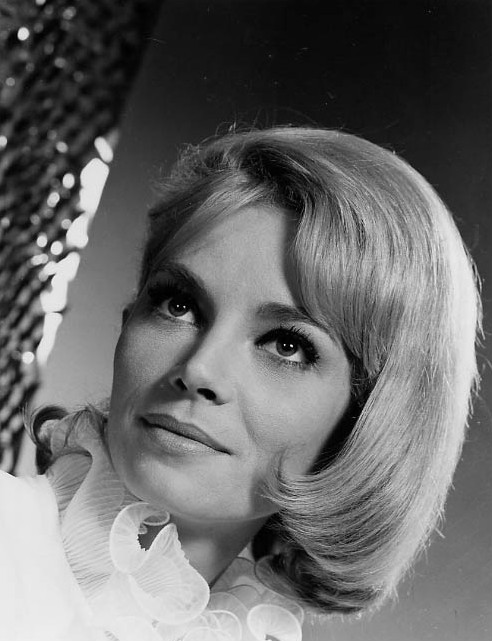
- Harty in 1968 publicity photo
- Born: November 5, 1941 (age 84); Washington, D.C., U.S.
- Occupation: Actress
- Years active: 1963–2003
- Spouses: E. Thomas Kearney; Michael Callan (m. 1968; div. 1970) Les Sheldon (m. 1975)

Patricia Harty (born November 5, 1941), also known professionally as Trisha Hart, is an American actress.

== Early years ==
Born in Washington, D.C., Harty lived in Baltimore until age 5, when she and her family moved. She took lessons in singing and dancing while growing up in North Miami, Florida, and graduated from Miami Edison High School in 1957. She worked for a lawyer, took secretarial classes, and majored in English at Columbia University.

== Career ==
Harty performed in the national company of I Ought to Be in Pictures. On Broadway, Harty's credits include Fiorello! (1959) and Sail Away (1961).

Harty debuted on television as a dancer on Pat Boone's ABC Chevy Show program, and Perry Como's NBC Kraft Music Hall. She was also a featured dancer on Garry Moore's CBS series, where she also performed in comedy skits with Carol Burnett. Harty is known for her starring roles in several short-lived television series, Occasional Wife (1966–67) as Greta Patterson, Blondie (1968-69) as the titular Blondie Bumstead, The Bob Crane Show (1975) as Ellie Wilcox, and Herbie, the Love Bug (1982) as Susan MacLane. She also appeared on Broadway in Fiorello! and Sail Away.

A review in The New York Times highlighted Harty's work in Occasional Wife, saying "she made a viewer more aware of what was right than wrong" with the show.

== Filmography ==
- 1970 : The Virginian (TV series) (TV) season 9 episode 09 (The price of the hanging) : Tracy

== Personal life ==
In the mid-1960s, Harty was married to E. Thomas Kearney, who was also her manager. She married Occasional Wife co-star Michael Callan. The marriage ended in divorce. She married Les Sheldon, who had been associate producer on The Bob Crane Show, in 1975.
