= The Last Temptation of Homer =

- The Simpsons episode
- Episode no.: Season 5 Episode 9
- Directed by: Carlos Baeza
- Written by: Frank Mula
- Production code: 1F07
- Original air date: December 9, 1993

Guest appearances
- Michelle Pfeiffer as Mindy Simmons; Werner Klemperer as Colonel Klink; Phil Hartman as Lionel Hutz

Episode features
- Chalkboard gag: "All work and no play makes Bart a dull boy"
- Couch gag: The Simpsons sit on the couch and find themselves on the set of the Late Show with David Letterman.
- Commentary: Matt Groening; David Mirkin; David Silverman

Episode chronology
← Previous "Boy-Scoutz 'n the Hood"	Next → "$pringfield (or, How I Learned to Stop Worrying and Love Legalized Gambling)"
- The Simpsons season 5

"The Last Temptation of Homer" is the ninth episode of the fifth season of the American animated television series The Simpsons. It originally aired on the Fox network in the United States on December 9, 1993. In the episode, an attractive female employee named Mindy is hired at the nuclear power plant. Homer and Mindy find themselves attracted to each other after bonding over their shared interests of beer, donuts and television. Although Homer is tempted to sleep with Mindy, he remains faithful to his wife Marge. Meanwhile, Bart becomes an outcast after medical treatments make him look like a nerd.

The episode was written by Frank Mula and directed by Carlos Baeza. It features cultural references to films such as The Wizard of Oz, It's a Wonderful Life, and A Christmas Carol. It did not get the usual amount of laughs at the test screenings, which made the staff worry the show was not as funny as they expected.

Since airing, the episode has received mostly positive reviews from television critics; guest star Michelle Pfeiffer was especially praised for her performance as Mindy, which was highlighted on Entertainment Weekly's list of the 16 best guest appearances on The Simpsons. It acquired a Nielsen rating of 12.7, and was the highest-rated show on the Fox network the week it aired.

== Plot ==
After Homer, Lenny, Carl, and Charlie miraculously escape from a gas leak at the Springfield Nuclear Power Plant, Charlie asks Mr. Burns to add a functional emergency exit to the plant. Burns degrades and promptly fires Charlie. During Burns's attempts to find Charlie's replacement, agents from the United States Department of Labor come to the plant and charge Burns with violations of several labor laws; Burns has employed undocumented immigrants and working animals, but has never hired a woman. A beautiful woman, Mindy Simmons, is hired and when Homer first sees her, he has a hallucination where she resembles the figure in The Birth of Venus by Sandro Botticelli, which he attributes to eating a packet of powdered gravy he found in the parking lot. Homer immediately becomes attracted to Mindy. Barney advises Homer to talk to Mindy because they will most likely have nothing in common. To his horror, Homer discovers that Mindy shares many of his interests, and Marge develops a cold, causing Homer to find her unattractive. While Homer and Mindy are in an elevator together, they catch each other muttering to themselves "think unsexy thoughts", and realize the attraction is mutual.

Bart is sent to an eye doctor, who finds Bart has a lazy eye and fits him with thick glasses he must wear for two weeks. A dermatologist treats Bart's dry scalp by matting his hair down with a medicated salve, parting his hair to both sides. He receives a pair of oversized shoes from the podiatrist to help his posture, and the otolaryngologist sprays his throat. These changes make Bart look and sound like a nerd, causing school bullies to pick on him. Bart eventually returns to school in his normal guise after his treatments end, but the bullies pummel him anyway.

Homer tells Mindy they should avoid each other because of their mutual attraction. However, Mr. Burns chooses Homer and Mindy to represent the power plant at the National Energy Convention in Capital City. To make matters worse, the convention organizers award Homer and Mindy a free dinner in a romantic restaurant. Later, in Homer's hotel room, Mindy tells Homer how she feels about him, but notices his anguish and tells him to decide what to do. Although he is very tempted by her, Homer declares his faithfulness to Marge. Mindy accepts his decision and leaves after they share a small kiss. Later, Marge and Homer share a romantic evening together in the same room.

== Production ==
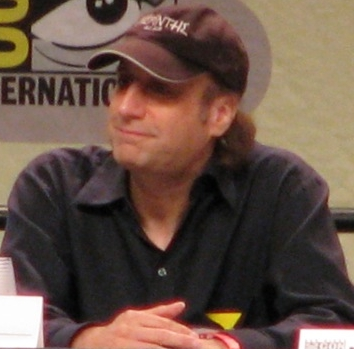
The idea of the episode came from show runner David Mirkin.

The episode was written by Frank Mula and directed by Carlos Baeza. The premise was pitched by then-show runner David Mirkin. When he was hired to work on The Simpsons, one of his goals was to study the aspect of Homer Simpson's character if he was "really tempted away" from Marge. Mirkin wanted to find out what would happen in a situation where Homer finds himself attracted to another woman. The Simpsons creator Matt Groening had previously written the third season episode "Colonel Homer", where Homer finds himself attracted to a country singer named Lurleen Lumpkin. In that episode, Lurleen immediately had a "crush" on Homer, but Homer belatedly became aware of it. With this episode, Mirkin wanted Homer to immediately know he was attracted to Mindy. Mirkin thought it was a "great exploration" to see what happened to Homer in this particular case.

The episode did not get the usual amount of laughs at the animatic test screening, which made the staff worry it was not as funny as they expected. Mirkin said it had to do with the fact that because there were very "subtle" performances in the episode, the animation had to be "exactly right" for it to be funny. Baeza and David Silverman, another animation director on the show, worked "hard" on the episode. Mirkin said from the very beginning it was a "huge group effort" from both the writing and the animation staff.

Many scenes in the animatic portrayed Mindy as flirty. Mirkin did not like this because the secret of the episode was Homer and Mindy are two good people who are thrown into the situation and "can't help that their libidos are going crazy upon seeing each other". He added that the two characters have "so much in common" that it is "not just a physical relationship, but a mental connection as well", and that Mindy is not a seductress but rather a woman just as nervous as Homer. Mirkin also pointed out that while Homer is being tempted by a "seemingly perfect" woman at work, his wife could not be more "imperfect" since she has got a cold and looks sick. "He's trying to connect with his family, but with Marge looking sick and Bart looking like a nerd, everything is just not working," Mirkin said.

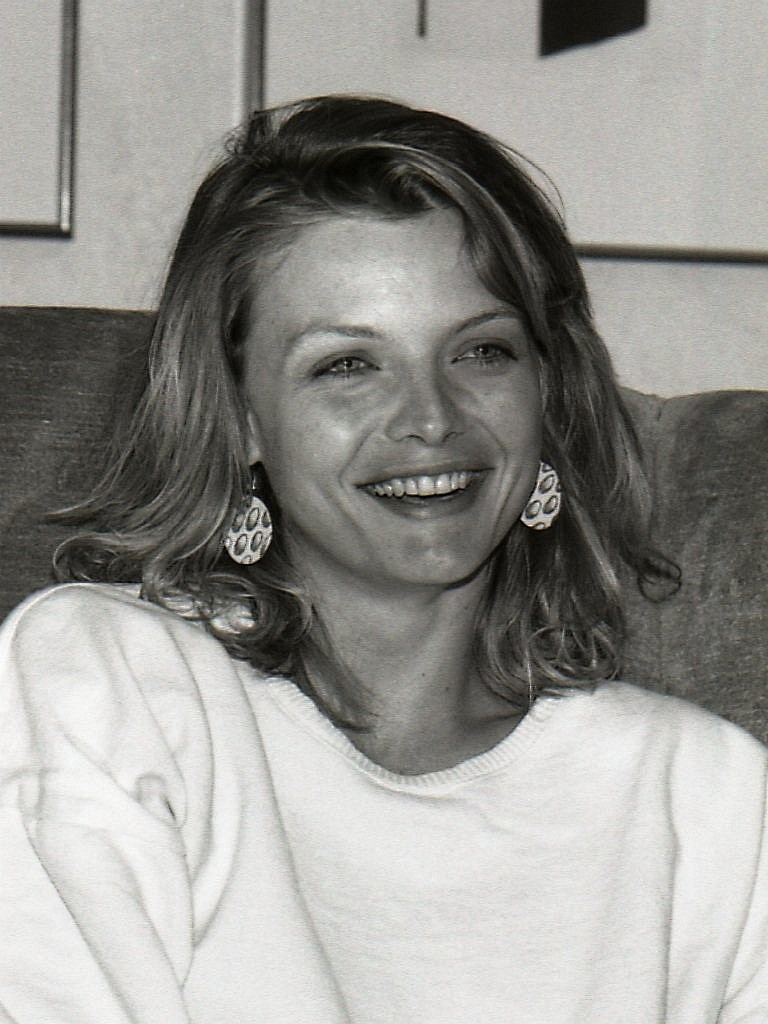
Michelle Pfeiffer guest starred in the episode as the voice of Mindy Simmons. Mirkin praised her performance as being "great".

Michelle Pfeiffer voiced Mindy Simmons. All the writers showed up at the recording studio in West Los Angeles, Los Angeles, California to see her record her lines. When Pfeiffer entered the room with her daughter, Pfeiffer was "mobbed" by the energy of the writers and directors, who were excited to see her. Mirkin, who directed Pfeiffer in the studio, was nervous because he thought she was a beautiful woman who was on a "completely different level" than the other actors and actresses he had directed on the show. Pfeiffer was also nervous because she had never voiced an animated character. Mirkin told her: "You're gonna love this more than anything you have ever done because it's calm and pleasant, and we have so much time to play and experiment." This helped her calm down and by the end of the session, she was "really relaxed" and they had a "fantastic" time.

Silverman told Pfeiffer to not sound too flirty, and that she should just act herself. In one scene, Mindy drools as she eats doughnuts, much like Homer. To get the right drool sound, Pfeiffer put broccoli and water in her mouth. Mirkin said he did not have to give much direction during the recording of Homer and Mindy's final scene together, in which Mindy tells Homer how she feels about him. Pfeiffer "hit it really well" and they did it several times to get it "more and more real". Mirkin also thought that Pfeiffer completely understood the part and played it perfectly. He described her as "one of those actresses that you don't even have to see to know they're great, instead you can hear from her voice what a brilliant actress she is." Dan Castellaneta was also praised by Mirkin for his performance as Homer. Castellaneta struggled to be "sweet" and "moving" in his performance.

When Homer calls a marriage counseling hotline in the episode, he accidentally knocks himself unconscious in the phone booth. In a dream, he is approached by his guardian angel. He initially takes the form of Isaac Newton, but since Homer has no idea who that is, he instead takes the form of Colonel Klink, and shows Homer what his life would be like without Marge (à la It's a Wonderful Life). Klink is a character on Hogan's Heroes and Klink's actor, Werner Klemperer, voiced Klink in this episode. Mirkin said Klemperer was a "fantastic sport" to do the character. Since Hogan's Heroes had gone off the air in 1971, he had forgotten how to play Klink. Mirkin therefore had to do an impression of Klink that Klemperer could imitate to get it right. This cameo was Klemperer's last credited role before his death in 2000.

== Cultural references ==
The title is a reference to "The Last Temptation of Christ" (1988). When Homer first meets Mindy, he imagines her as Venus in Sandro Botticelli's painting The Birth of Venus. To deal with Homer and Mindy charging room service to the company, Mr. Burns unleashes flying monkeys à la the Wicked Witch of the West in The Wizard of Oz (1939). However, the attempt fails as the monkeys all fall to their deaths. The scene where Homer meets his guardian angel in the guise of Isaac Newton (who changes into Colonel Klink from Hogan's Heroes because Homer doesn't know who Newton is), showing him what his life would have been like if he married Mindy and not Marge, draws from the films It's a Wonderful Life and A Christmas Carol. When Homer meets Mindy in the elevator, he thinks "unsexy thoughts" to avoid being seduced by her; specifically, he imagines Barney in a bikini and humming the I Dream of Jeannie theme. At home, Homer watches a TV show about the 'secret affairs' of Kennedy, Eisenhower, Bush and Clinton. When telling Mindy that they should avoid each other, Homer says he is "sweating like [film critic] Roger Ebert". As Homer attempts read the notes for Mindy that he wrote on his sweat-smeared hand, he unknowingly babbles the Nam Myoho Renge Kyo, a Japanese Buddhist chant in Nichiren Buddhism and Soka Gakkai. This is a reference to an Akbar and Jeff cartoon, written by Groening, in which the same mantra is used. In the bathroom, Homer sings a rough version of the Barry Manilow song "Mandy", replacing "Mandy" with "Mindy". Homer imagines Mindy agreeing with him that Ziggy has "gotten too preachy". Barry White's song "Can't Get Enough of Your Love, Babe" is played in the episode's final scene where Homer and Marge make love in the hotel room; the song was featured in the fourth season episode "Whacking Day".

== Reception ==
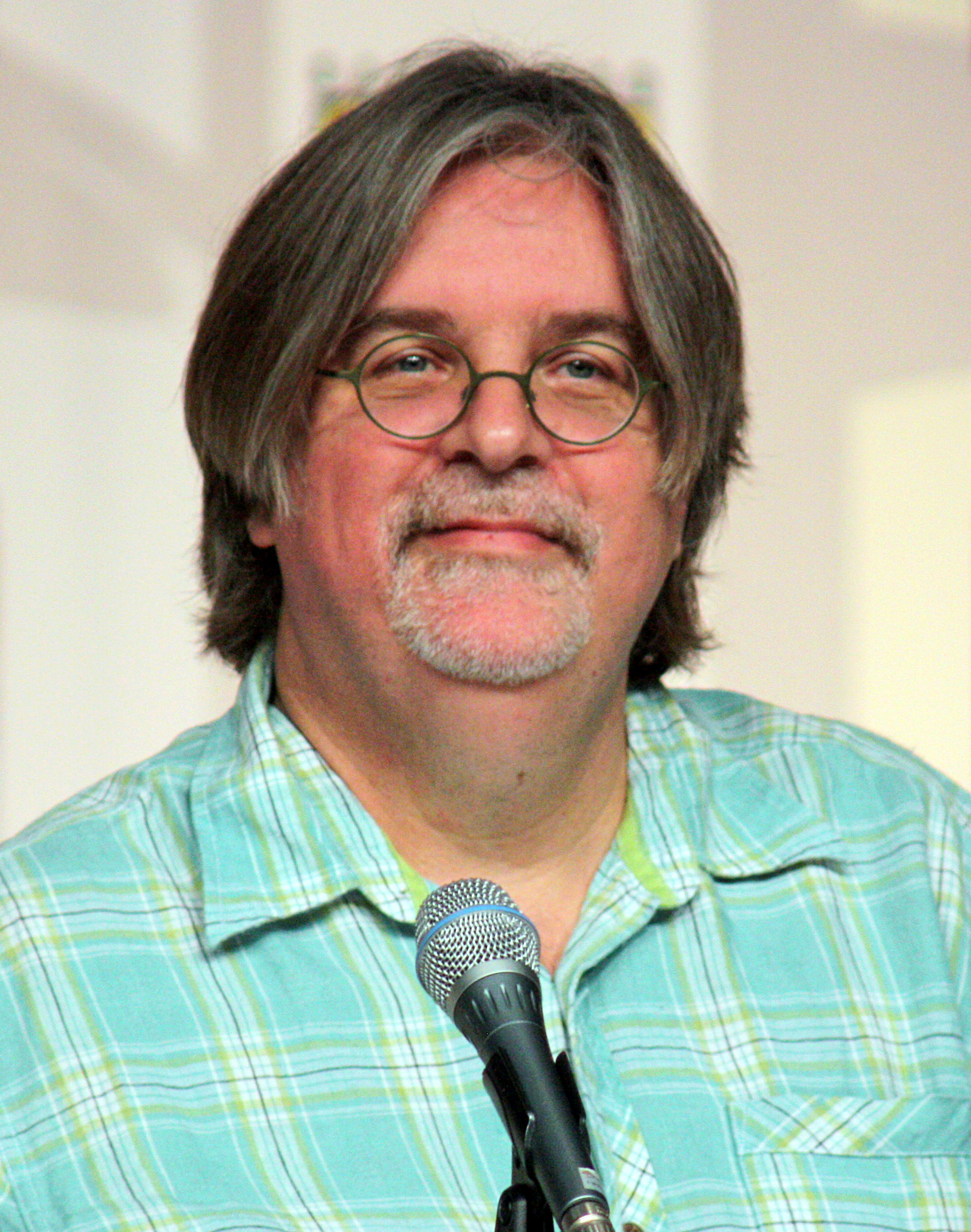
Matt Groening thought the episode was "amazing".

In its original American broadcast, "The Last Temptation of Homer" finished 24th (tied with The Fresh Prince of Bel-Air) in the ratings for the week of December 6–12, 1993. It acquired a Nielsen rating of 12.7. The episode was the highest-rated show on the Fox network that week.

Since airing, the episode has received mostly positive reviews from television critics.

In 2003, it was placed tenth on Entertainment Weekly's top 25 The Simpsons episode list, and The Daily Telegraph characterized the episode as one of "The 10 Best Simpsons Television Episodes". Nancy Basile of About.com named it one of her top twenty favorite episodes of the show, and said Michelle Pfeiffer "is so elegant and beautiful, that the irony of her playing a burping love interest for Homer Simpson is funny enough." She added "the thorny issue of adultery is tackled in a way only The Simpsons could," and "though Homer is contemplating cheating, he's a sympathetic and almost innocent character." The authors of the book I Can't Believe It's a Bigger and Better Updated Unofficial Simpsons Guide, Gary Russell and Gareth Roberts, called it a "wonderfully scripted episode". DVD Movie Guide's Colin Jacobson said, "Given Homer’s utter devotion to Marge, it may seem off-character for him to fall for Mindy, but the show makes it fit, as his obsession doesn’t come across as inconsistent." He added the plot with Bart becoming a nerd is the "funnier one" of the two. Bill Gibron of DVD Talk called it a "jest fest loaded with insight into the human heart and hilarious over-the-top goofiness."

In a review of the 2008 episode "Dangerous Curves", Robert Canning of IGN called the episode "smart, touching and funny", and said "it did a great job showing Homer's struggle to deal with the flirtations of a co-worker."

TV DVD Reviews's Kay Daly called it the season's finest episode with the "greatest foray into emotional resonance". Matt Groening thought it was an amazing episode with "a lot of fun" in it. David Mirkin said Frank Mula's script was great. In 2008, Entertainment Weekly named Pfeiffer's role as Mindy one of the 16 best guest appearances on The Simpsons. She also appeared on AOL's list of their top favorite guest stars on the show. Brett Buckalew of Metromix Indianapolis wrote that Pfeiffer "gives arguably the best celebrity guest-vocal performance in series history." Total Film's Nathan Ditum ranked her performance as the 15th best guest appearance in the show's history.

When the inspectors visit the plant, they mention finding an entire Brazilian soccer team working there, and Burns says that they have to because their plane crashed on his property. This scene was mentioned by various media outlets after the 2016 disaster that killed most players on the Brazilian team Chapecoense.

Nathan Rabin notes Bart's discovery of "a secret society of underground nerds that in any other show could easily be the foundation for an entire episode, if not an entire season, but here is only used as a throwaway gag. The episode ends as it must: with Homer flagrantly disobeying a fortune cookie that had told him he would find new love and inviting Marge to his hotel room for some dirty, dirty hotel sex, the very best kind of sex there is. 'The Last Temptation Of Homer' concludes with Marge and Homer’s marriage being lustily and satisfactorily reaffirmed, with the deep, true love Homer and Marge share overcoming his intense but passing physical attraction to Mindy. It’s a sweet and tender episode that also has the benefit of being consistently hilarious around the edges. From the flying-impaired 'flying monkeys' Burns is raising as hench-monkeys plummeting immediately to the ground after exiting a window to a visibly agitated Martin Prince leaping up and imploring his teacher, 'Pick me, teacher! I’m ever so smart!' when a vision-impaired Bart stalls on answering a question in class, it’s chockablock with inspired bits of business. In its god-like prime The Simpsons did not need to sacrifice laughs for heart or vice versa."
