= St. Paul the Apostle Church and School =

St. Paul the Apostle Church
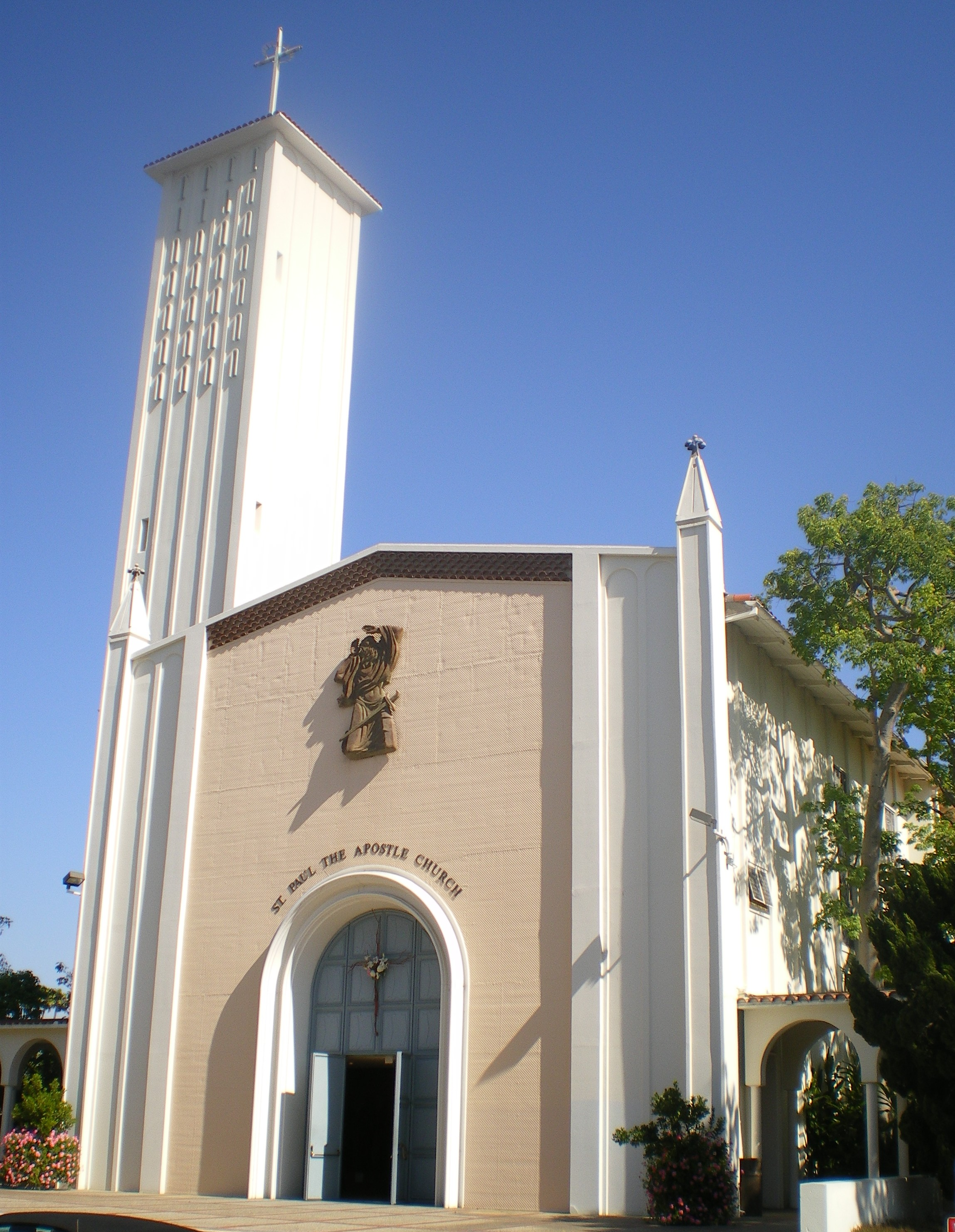
- St. Paul the Apostle Church
- 34.05584°N 118.43706°W
- Location: 10750 Ohio Avenue; Los Angeles, California
- Country: United States
- Denomination: Roman Catholic
- Religious order: Paulist Fathers, Daughters of Mary and Joseph

History
- Status: Parish church
- Consecrated: June 29, 1958

Architecture
- Functional status: Active
- Years built: 1956-58

Administration
- Archdiocese: Los Angeles
- Parish: St. Paul the Apostle

Clergy
- Pastor(s): Rev Gilbert Martinez, CSP

St. Paul the Apostle School

Location
- 1536 Selby Avenue; Los Angeles, California 90024; United States

Information
- Type: Private
- Denomination: Roman Catholic
- Patron saint: St. Paul the Apostle
- Principal: Dr. Joe Reiken
- Grades: DK-8
- Enrollment: 541
- Student to teacher ratio: 13:1
- Area: Westwood
- Campus type: Urban
- Colors: Green and White
- Athletics conference: Catholic Youth Organization, Pacific Basin League
- Sports: Basketball, Flag Football, Volleyball, Track and Field, Cross Country
- Nickname: SPA
- Team name: Saints
- Accreditation: Western Association of Schools and Colleges
- Newspaper: SPA Halo
- Endowment: US$2 million
- Pastor: Reverend Gilbert Martinez CSP
- Athletic Director: Keith Mortimer
- Coordinator of Advancement: Mary Pat Cooper
- Website: sp-apostle.org

St. Paul the Apostle Church and School is a Catholic church complex established in 1935 in Los Angeles, California.

== Description ==
The complex is a part of the Archdiocese of Los Angeles and is staffed by the Paulist Fathers and the Daughters of Mary and Joseph, who are also active in the parochial school. Both the church and the school are named after St. Paul the Apostle. St Paul The Apostle School has 1301 total employees across all of its locations and generates $1.09 million in revenue.

St. Paul the Apostle School is a Catholic coeducational K-8 school located next to the church. Colloquially known as "St. Paul's," the school is adjacent to the community of Westwood, and admits students from the greater Los Angeles area. It is also affiliated with the National Catholic Educational Association.

== History ==
The church traces its beginnings to the 1920s when John Joseph Cantwell, then the Bishop of Los Angeles, requested the Paulist Fathers to establish a new parish to serve the community of Westwood and the new University of California, Los Angeles campus. The parish was organized in 1928 and the priests were specifically charged with ministering to local residents, UCLA faculty and students and "the moving picture people" (employees in the film and television industry).

The current property on which the church and school are co-located on was only obtained during the 1930s. Prior to that, the priests held mass on numerous sites as they searched for a suitable location to build the parish church.

The parish school was opened in 1935. The current church building was completed in 1958.

Due to its proximity to Hollywood, the church has been attended by and held the funerals of notable personalities in the entertainment industry. It held the funeral mass of entertainer Bing Crosby, actor and radio personality Bob Crane, pioneering director and producer Hal Roach and actor Carroll O'Connor, who was also a devout parishioner.
