= Cynthia Lynn =

American actress (1937–2014)

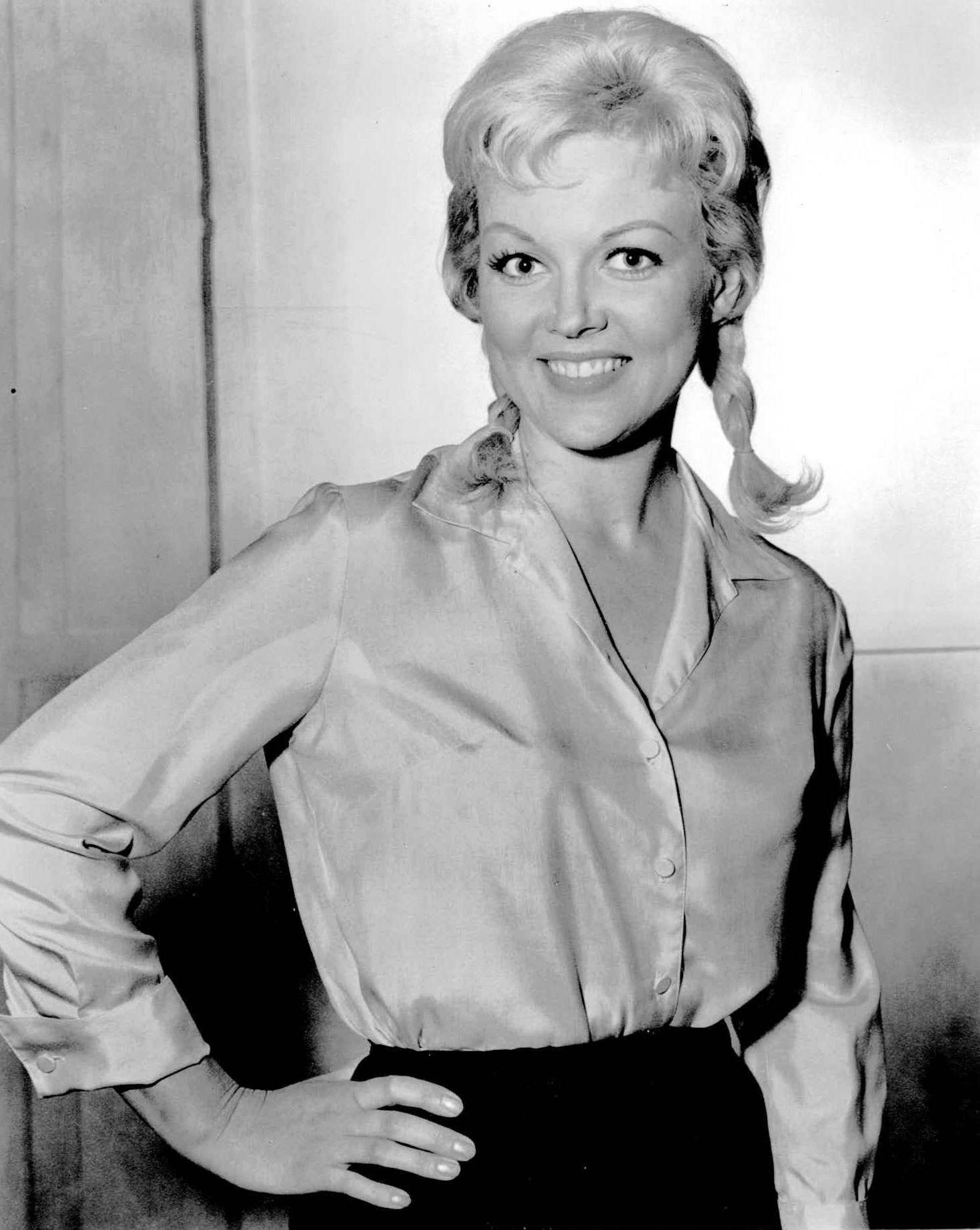
- Lynn as Fräulein Helga in Hogan's Heroes, c. 1965
- Born: Zinta Valda Ziemelis; April 2, 1937; Riga, Latvia
- Died: March 10, 2014 (aged 76); Los Angeles, California, U.S.
- Occupation: Actress
- Years active: 1962–1975
- Known for: Hogan's Heroes
- Children: 2

Cynthia Lynn (born Zinta Valda Ziemelis; April 2, 1937 – March 10, 2014) was an American actress.

== Early life ==
Lynn was born in Riga, Latvia, as Zinta Valda Ziemelis. At age eight, she and her mother, Alisa, fled the country after the Soviet re-occupation of Latvia in 1944 during World War II, eventually arriving in the United States in 1950.

== Career ==
Lynn portrayed "Fräulein Helga", Colonel Klink's original secretary in Hogan's Heroes during the first season (1965–1966). The secretary's role was played by Sigrid Valdis as "Hilda" in the next five seasons. Lynn returned to the series in the 1968 and 1971 episodes "Will the Blue Baron Strike Again" and "Easy Come, Easy Go", respectively. Her last acting role was in 1975 in an episode of Harry O. She also appeared in such television series as Gidget Grows Up, Mission: Impossible, The Odd Couple, Love American Style, and The Six Million Dollar Man.

Lynn wrote an autobiography, Escape to Freedom, in 2000, with the assistance of Edward Ansara.

== Personal life and death ==
Although no public record of the marriage has been found, Lynn was allegedly married at the time she worked on Hogan's Heroes where she was known to have had a romantic relationship with co-star Bob Crane. Prior to this she had been romantically involved with actor Marlon Brando. After Brando's death in 2004, Lynn's daughter, Lisa, claimed that the short-lived affair between her mother and Brando resulted in her birth in 1964. Lynn also had a son, Tony. Lynn died on March 10, 2014, at age 76, from multiple organ failure after developing hepatitis.

== Filmography ==
Year	Title	Role	Notes
1964	Honeymoon Hotel	Mrs. Christopher	Uncredited
1964	Bedtime Story	Frieda	
