= Herbie, the Love Bug (TV series) =

1982 American television sitcom

- Based on: Characters by Gordon Buford
- Written by: Arthur Alsberg; Don Nelson; Don Tait
- Directed by: Charles S. Dubin; Vincent McEveety; Bill Bixby
- Starring: Dean Jones; Patricia Harty; Richard Paul; Claudia Wells; Douglas Emerson; Nicky Katt; Larry Linville
- Music by: Frank De Vol; Tom Worrall
- Opening theme: "Herbie, My Best Friend" sung by Dean Jones
- Country of origin: United States
- Original language: English
- No. of seasons: 1
- No. of episodes: 5

Production
- Executive producer: William Robert Yates
- Producer: Kevin Corcoran
- Cinematography: Jack A. Whitman Jr. Jack Swain
- Editors: Gordon Brenner; Marsh Hendry; Ron Honthaner
- Running time: 48 minutes
- Production company: Walt Disney Productions

Original release
- Network: CBS
- Release: March 17 – April 14, 1982

Herbie, the Love Bug is an American television sitcom that aired on CBS from March 17 to April 14, 1982. It was produced by Walt Disney Productions and based on a series of films about Herbie, a sentient pearl white 1963 Volkswagen Beetle.

The show was a five-episode mid-season replacement series. It was the last production to feature the starring car until 1997's television film The Love Bug. The show's theme song "Herbie, My Best Friend" was performed by its star, Dean Jones.

== Plot ==
Dean Jones, who had appeared in two of the films (The Love Bug and Herbie Goes to Monte Carlo), reprises his role of Jim Douglas, Herbie's original owner, now a retired race car driver who works as an instructor at the Famous Driving School with his partner Bo Phillips (Richard Paul). He and Herbie stumble upon a bank robbery in progress. They manage to thwart the crime and rescue a young divorcée named Susan MacLane (Patricia Harty), who works at the bank and is a mother of three: Julie (Claudia Wells), Robbie (Douglas Emerson) and Matthew (Nicky Katt). Jim and Susan soon begin to fall in love, much to the consternation of her ex-boyfriend Randy Bigelow (Larry Linville). Randy's attempts to break them up are in vain; Jim and Susan get married in "Herbie the Best Man" episode that aired on April 7.

== Cast ==
- Dean Jones as James "Jim" Douglas
- Patricia Harty as Susan MacLane
- Richard Paul as Bo Phillips
- Claudia Wells as Julie MacLane
- Douglas Emerson as Robbie MacLane
- Nicky Katt as Matthew MacLane
- Bryan Utman as Jason
- Larry Linville as Randy Bigelow
- Natalie Core as Mrs. Bigelow

== Episodes ==
| No. | Title | Directed by | Written by | Original release date |
|---|---|---|---|---|
| 1 | "Herbie the Matchmaker" | Charles S. Dubin | Arthur Alsberg, Don Nelson | March 17, 1982 |
Herbie and his owner, Jim Douglas, stumble on an attempted bank robbery and rescue a hostage.
| 2 | "Herbie to the Rescue" | Vincent McEveety | Arthur Alsberg, Don Nelson | March 24, 1982 |
Jim's driving school is closed down when Herbie interferes with a motor vehicle inspection.
| 3 | "My House is Your House" | Bill Bixby | Don Tait | March 31, 1982 |
Jim's ex-girlfriend, Diane Darcy (Andrea Howard), surprisingly shows up at his bachelor party.
| 4 | "Herbie the Best Man" | Vincent McEveety | Arthur Alsberg, Don Nelson | April 7, 1982 |
Randy Bigelow kidnaps Herbie and substitutes a look-alike in a desperate attempt to break up Jim and Susan's wedding.
| 5 | "Calling Dr. Herbie" | Bill Bixby | Arthur Alsberg, Don Nelson | April 14, 1982 |
Jim and Susan decide to sell her car to buy a family station wagon.
