= Douglas Emerson =

American actor (born 1974)

- Born: October 5, 1974 (age 51); Glendale, California, U.S.
- Occupation: Actor
- Years active: 1982–1991
- Spouse: Emily Barth (m. 1996)
- Children: 2

Douglas Emerson (born October 5, 1974) is an American former child actor who played Scott Scanlon on Beverly Hills, 90210 in the show's first and second seasons and played Eddie Beckner in The Blob.

== Biography ==
=== Early life ===
Douglas Emerson was born October 5, 1974 in Glendale, California to Diane and John Emerson. One of 6 children, he grew up in Canoga Park, California and began working as a child actor at age 4.

=== Career ===
In the first season of Beverly Hills, 90210, Emerson's character Scott Scanlon was a nerdy freshman and best friends with David Silver, played by Brian Austin Green. Emerson's character was reduced to a recurring role in the second season and the character died following the unintentional discharge of a handgun at his birthday party.

After his departure from the show, Emerson enrolled in junior college and in 1993 transferred to Pepperdine University. He dropped out to join the U.S. Air Force in 1996. By 2002, he attained the rank of staff sergeant working in intelligence and had earned a dozen awards for, among other accomplishments, planning missions during the 1999 Kosovo War. He left the Air Force in 2003.

In 2019, Emerson reunited with 90210 co-stars Brian Austin Green and Ian Ziering at a Peach Pit charity pop up honoring the late Luke Perry.

=== Personal life ===
Douglas Emerson married Emily Barth, whom he met while studying at Pepperdine, in 1996. The couple has two daughters, Hayley and Hannah.

== Filmography ==
Year	Title	Role	Notes
1982	CHiPs	Boy in Car	Episode: "Flare Up"
1982	Herbie, the Love Bug	Robbie MacLane	5 episodes
1984	Highway to Heaven	Donny Wells	Episode: "Hotel of Dreams"
1985	Wildside	Markie Jonsen	Episode: "The Crimea of the Century"
1985	Alfred Hitchcock Presents	Kid Soldier	Segment: "Bang! You're Dead!"
1985	Malice in Wonderland	Young Bill Harper	TV movie
1986	The Twilight Zone	Young Roger	Segment: "The Elevator"
1986	Trapper John, M.D.	Morgan Christmas	Episode: "Life, Death and Dr. Christmas"
1986	Brothers	Harry	Episode: "Harry and the Ogre of Ock"
1986	Something in Common	Jason Grant	TV movie
1986	The Disney Sunday Movie	Harry	Episode: "The Leftovers"
1986	Body Slam	Kid in Parking Lot	
1986	Small Wonder	Adam	Episode: "Thanksgiving Story"
1986	Night Court	Ernie	Episode: "Earthquake"
1987	Million Dollar Mystery	Howie Briggs	
1987	Dolly		Episode: "A Down Home Country Christmas"
1988	Fun House	Himself, contestant	pilot
1988	Mr. Belvedere	Vance	Episode: "G.I. George"
1988	The Wonder Years	Kid #1	Episode: "Swingers"
1988	The Blob	Eddie Beckner	
1988	The River Pirates	Spit	
1990–1991	Beverly Hills, 90210	Scott Scanlon	26 episodes
1991	Blossom	Boy #2	Episode: "Honor?"
