= The Bob Crane Show =

American sitcom (1975)

- Title card
- Also known as: Second Start
- Genre: Sitcom
- Created by: Norman S. Powell; Martin Cohan; Jim Allen
- Starring: Bob Crane; Patricia Harty
- Country of origin: United States
- Original language: English
- No. of seasons: 1
- No. of episodes: 14

Production
- Camera setup: Multi-camera
- Running time: 30 minutes
- Production company: MTM Enterprises

Original release
- Network: NBC
- Release: March 6 – June 19, 1975

The Bob Crane Show is an American sitcom that aired on NBC from March 6 to June 19, 1975. The series starred Bob Crane as Bob Wilcox, a man in his 40s who abruptly quits his job as an insurance company executive to enter medical school. The series co-starred Patricia Harty as his wife Ellie Wilcox, who becomes the family's breadwinner while Bob is in school. The family helped out at home, but at school Bob faced the problem of being so much older than the other students. Characters such as Mr. Busso, the nutty landlord, and the overzealous Dean Ingersoll added to the show's comedy.

After initial delays, the series debuted on March 6, 1975. It performed poorly in the Nielsen ratings and was canceled after 14 episodes were broadcast.

== Production ==
The Bob Crane Show was originally titled Second Start, and NBC planned to debut it in the fall of 1974. However, the Federal Communications Commission re-instituted its Prime Time Access Rule, which limited the broadcast networks to programming only three of the four hours of the prime time programming block. This decision led NBC to delay the series until January 1975. Crane re-shot the pilot, leading to another delay to March 1975.

Crane expressed his desire that his series be what he called "hard comedy", which he described as comedy that "goes for the fences. It's also what you might call take-a-risk comedy because if you don't hit a home run, you might strike out. It's either a belly laugh or it's no go and no show."

MTM Enterprises, who had produced the hit shows The Mary Tyler Moore Show and The Bob Newhart Show, among others, produced the series, which was filmed with three-cameras in front of a studio audience, whose responses were "sweetened" with a laugh track.

== Cast ==
- Bob Crane as Bob Wilcox
- Patricia Harty as Ellie Wilcox
- Todd Susman as Marvin Susman
- Jack Fletcher as Dean Lyle Ingersoll
- Ronny Graham as Ernest Busso
- Erica Petal as Pam Wilcox
- James Sutorius as Jerry Mallory

== Episodes ==
No.	Title	Directed by	Written by	Original release date
1	"Mid-Term Blues"	Jay Sandrich	Martin Donovan	March 6, 1975
Bob Wilcox returns to medical school, leaving the responsibility for supporting the family on his wife Ellie and facing mid-term exams.
2	"Not with My Mother You Don't"	Norman S. Powell	Arlene Stadd & Leonard Stadd	March 13, 1975
Bob's mother (Audra Lindley) moves in with a man the same age as Bob.
3	"The Incredible Shrinking Bob"	Norman S. Powell	Unknown	March 20, 1975
Bob's anxiety over leaving his wife as sole financial supporter grows.
4	"Ellie's Sister"	Norman S. Powell	Jim Allen	March 27, 1975
Two of Bob's classmates fall in love with his visiting sister-in-law.
5	"One Summer of Misery"	Norman S. Powell	Unknown	April 3, 1975
Bob receives a summer scholarship to Columbia University but frets that Ellie, who can't afford to go with him, is a little too eager to see him go.
6	"But I Love My Wife"	Jack Shea	Martin Cohan	April 17, 1975
A South African exchange student zeroes in on Bob with her swinging singles approach to medical studies.
7	"Acute Bussophobia"	Norman S. Powell	Unknown	April 24, 1975
Bob's old skills of salesmanship come in handy when he has to persuade his landlord to enter the hospital for an operation.
8	"Grin and Bare It"	Norman S. Powell	Unknown	May 1, 1975
Ellie decides to supplement her income by posing as a nude model for art classes at Bob's college.
9	"A Case of Misdiagnosis"	Norman S. Powell	Jim Allen	May 8, 1975
Bob treats an old friend (John Astin) and is surprised to learn the man is a prominent gay activist, prompting concern that people will think he is also gay. NBC, worried that the script might be offensive to gay people, refused to approve the episode until it was reviewed by gay media activist Newton Dieter.
10	"The Lyle Principle"	Norman S. Powell	Unknown	May 15, 1975
Bob and a friend give the newly appointed dean a pep talk.
11	"An American Fiasco"	Norman S. Powell	Martin Donovan	May 22, 1975
The descent of a pair of young documentary filmmakers on the Wilcox household creates havoc in domestic tranquility for Bob and Ellie.
12	"The Doctor Sings the Blues"	Norman S. Powell	Unknown	May 29, 1975
Bob's burgeoning friendship with his anatomy professor backfires when the man unloads his marital problems on Bob.
13	"The Embezzler"	Norman S. Powell	Unknown	June 5, 1975
When the last man he hired before resigning as an insurance company executive embezzles thousands of dollars from the firm, Bob is suspected of having been an accessory.
14	"The Son of the Campus Capers"	Georg Tyne	Lloyd Garver & Ken Hecht	June 12, 1975
A campus flirtation of 20 years before causes some anxious moments for Bob when the lady (Gloria LeRoy) turns up married to the dean (John Hillerman) of the medical school.

== Reception ==
The Bob Crane Show finished the season in 65th place with a 14.9 Nielsen rating, a disappointment to the network. NBC cancelled the series after 13 weeks.

Series star Crane blamed the failure on the lack of chemistry among the characters. He compared The Bob Crane Show to its fellow MTM series, The Mary Tyler Moore Show and The Bob Newhart Show, in wishing that the same sorts of character relationships on those series had been present in his. "I had nobody to talk to....In my series, I had no Bill Daily."
