= John Henry Carpenter =

American accused murderer (1928–1998)

- Carpenter during his 1994 trial
- Born: June 24, 1928; Los Angeles, California, U.S.
- Died: September 3, 1998 (aged 70); Torrance, California, U.S.
- Occupation: Video equipment salesman
- Known for: Friendship with, then accused in the murder of, actor Bob Crane
- Spouse: Diana Tootikian

John Henry Carpenter (June 24, 1928 – September 3, 1998) was an American video equipment salesman, most widely known as a friend—and the accused murderer—of actor Bob Crane, who died in 1978.

== Biography ==
Carpenter was born in 1928 in Los Angeles, of Native American and Spanish heritage.

Carpenter served in the United States Army and was married twice. Following his retirement from the Army, he took a job marketing video technology, achieving expertise in that field and becoming head of the video wing of a new Japanese electronics company debuting in the United States, later known as Sony.

=== Relationship with Bob Crane ===
During the run of Hogan's Heroes (1965–1971), actor Richard Dawson introduced Bob Crane, star of the series, to Carpenter, then a regional sales manager for Sony Electronics. Carpenter often helped famous clients with video and audio equipment. The two men struck up a friendship and began going to bars together. Crane attracted women due to his celebrity status and good looks, and introduced Carpenter as his manager. Later, the two would videotape their sexual encounters with women they met. While Crane's son Robert later insisted that all of the women were aware of the videotaping and consented to it, some, according to one source, had no idea they had been recorded until informed by police after Crane's murder. During his friendship with Crane, Carpenter became national sales manager at Akai and arranged his business trips to coincide with Crane's dinner theater touring schedule, so that the two could continue seducing and videotaping women after Hogan's Heroes had run its course. Crane was discovered bludgeoned to death in Scottsdale, Arizona, on June 29, 1978.

=== Investigation and trial ===
The crime scene yielded few clues; no evidence was found of forced entry, and nothing of value was missing. Detectives examined Crane's extensive videotape collection, which led them to Carpenter, who had flown to Phoenix on June 25 to spend a few days with Crane. Carpenter's rental car was impounded and searched. Several blood smears were found that matched Crane's blood type; no one else of that blood type was known to have been in the car, including Carpenter. DNA testing was not yet available, and the Maricopa County district attorney declined to file charges.

In 1990, investigators re-examined the evidence from 1978 and persuaded the county attorney to reopen the case. DNA testing was inconclusive on the blood found in Carpenter's rental car, but an evidence photograph of the car's interior appeared to show a piece of brain tissue. The actual tissue samples recovered from the car had been lost, but an Arizona judge ruled that the new evidence was admissible. In June 1992, Carpenter was arrested and charged with Crane's murder.

Carpenter was tried in 1994 and eventually acquitted. As a result of the accusation, he was fired from work as National Service Manager at the electronics firm Kenwood USA. He always maintained his innocence, and later said he felt a huge relief after his name had been cleared. One jury member later said in an interview that the jury believed there was insufficient proof to determine Carpenter's guilt and that "you cannot prove someone guilty on speculation."

Carpenter died in 1998 in Torrance, California. In the 2002 biopic Auto Focus, Carpenter was played by Willem Dafoe.
