= Bob Crane =

American actor (1928–1978)

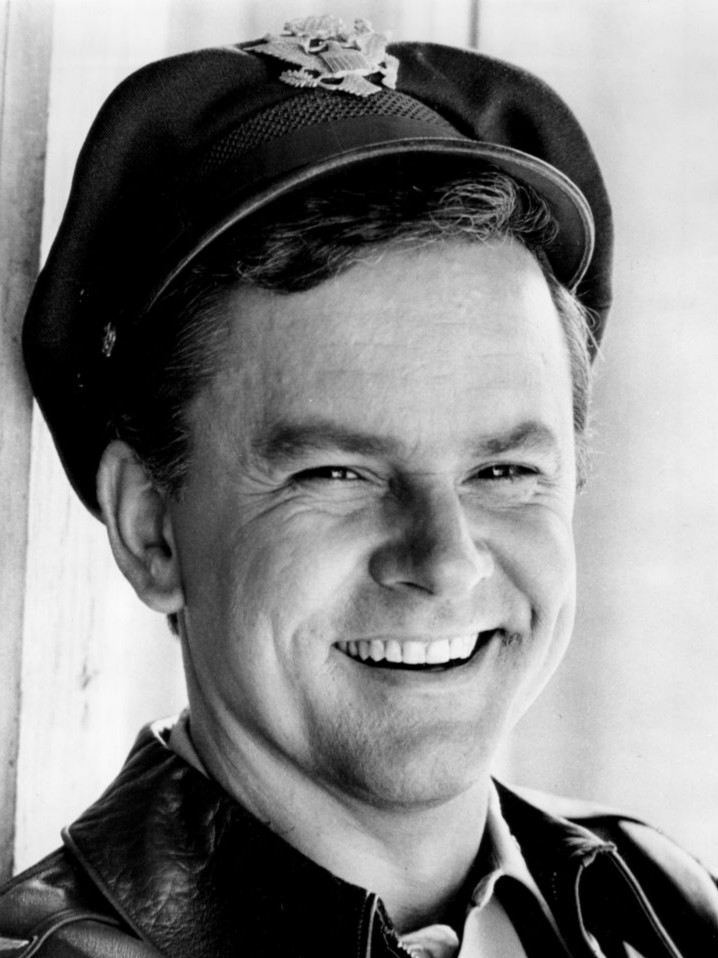
- Crane in Hogan's Heroes, 1969
- Born: Robert Edward Crane; July 13, 1928; Waterbury, Connecticut, U.S.
- Died: June 29, 1978 (aged 49); Scottsdale, Arizona, U.S.
- Cause of death: Homicide
- Resting place: Westwood Village Memorial Park Cemetery
- Occupations: Actor; drummer; radio host; disc jockey
- Years active: 1950–1978
- Spouses: Anne Terzian (m. 1949; div. 1970) Sigrid Valdis (m. 1970)
- Children: 5

Robert Edward Crane (July 13, 1928 – June 29, 1978) was an American actor, drummer, radio personality, disc jockey and star of the CBS sitcom Hogan's Heroes.

Crane was a drummer from age 11, and began his entertainment career as a radio personality, beginning in Hornell, New York, and later in Connecticut. He then moved to Los Angeles, where he hosted the number-one rated morning radio show on KNX-AM. In the early 1960s, Crane moved into acting, eventually landing the lead role of Colonel Robert Hogan in Hogan's Heroes. The series aired from 1965 to 1971, and Crane received two Emmy Award nominations.

Crane's career declined after Hogan's Heroes. He became frustrated with the few roles that he was being offered and began performing in dinner theater. In 1975 he returned to television with the NBC series The Bob Crane Show, but the series received poor ratings and was cancelled after thirteen weeks. Afterward, Crane returned to performing in dinner theater and also appeared in occasional guest spots on television.

Crane was found bludgeoned to death in his Scottsdale, Arizona, apartment while on tour in June 1978 for a dinner theater production of Beginner's Luck. In the 1990s his friend John Henry Carpenter was tried for the murder but was acquitted, and the case remains officially unsolved. Crane's previously uncontroversial public image suffered due to the violent nature of his death and posthumous revelations about his personal life.

== Early life ==
Bob Crane was born in Waterbury, Connecticut, the younger of two sons to Rose Mary (née Ksenich) and Alfred Thomas Crane—the original spelling of the family name was Crean. Crane spent his childhood and teenaged years in Stamford.

Crane began playing drums at the age of 11, and by junior high was organizing local drum and bugle parades with his neighborhood friends. He joined his high school's orchestra and its marching and jazz bands. Crane also played for the Connecticut and Norwalk Symphony Orchestras as part of their youth orchestra program. He graduated from Stamford High School in 1946. Two years later, he enlisted for two years in the Connecticut Army National Guard and was honorably discharged in 1950. The previous year, he married his high-school sweetheart, Anne Terzian. The couple had three children: Robert David, Deborah Anne, and Karen Leslie.

== Career ==
=== Early career ===
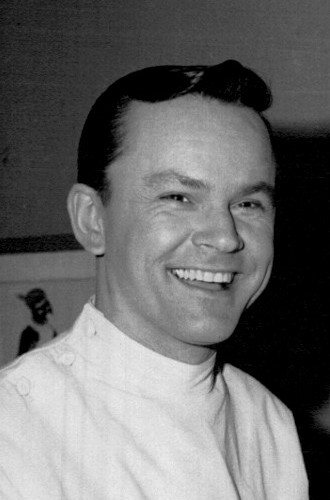
Crane in 1963

In 1950, Crane began his career in radio broadcasting at WLEA in Hornell, New York. He soon moved to Connecticut stations WLAD in Danbury, WBIS in Bristol and then WICC in Bridgeport, a 1,000-watt operation with a signal covering the northeastern portion of the New York metropolitan area. In 1956, Crane was hired by CBS Radio to host the morning show at its West Coast flagship KNX in Los Angeles, partly to re-energize that station's ratings and partly to halt his erosion of suburban ratings at WCBS in New York City. In Los Angeles, Crane filled the broadcast with sly wit, drumming and such guests as Marilyn Monroe, Frank Sinatra and Bob Hope. His show quickly topped the morning ratings with adult listeners, and he became "king of the Los Angeles airwaves."

Crane's acting ambitions led to guest-hosting for Johnny Carson on the daytime game show Who Do You Trust? and appearances on The Twilight Zone (uncredited), Channing, Alfred Hitchcock Presents and General Electric Theater. After Carl Reiner appeared on his radio show, Crane persuaded Reiner to book him for a guest appearance on The Dick Van Dyke Show.

=== The Donna Reed Show (1963–1964) ===
After seeing Crane's performance on The Dick Van Dyke Show, Donna Reed offered him a guest shot on her program, ABC's The Donna Reed Show. After the success of that episode, Crane's character, Dr. David Kelsey, was incorporated into the show's storyline, and Crane became a regular cast member, beginning with the episode "Friends and Neighbors." Crane continued to work full-time at KNX during his stint on The Donna Reed Show, running back and forth from the KNX studio at Columbia Square to Columbia Studios. He left the show in December 1964.

=== Hogan's Heroes (1965–1971) ===
In 1965, Crane was offered the starring role in a CBS television sitcom set in a World War II POW camp. Hogan's Heroes involved the sabotage and espionage missions of Allied soldiers, led by Colonel Robert Hogan, from under the noses of the oblivious Germans guarding them. The show was an immediate ratings hit, finishing in the top ten in its first year. The series lasted for six seasons on CBS, and Crane was nominated for an Emmy Award in 1966 and 1967.

After having a love affair with Hogan co-star Cynthia Lynn, the actress who played Helga, Crane became romantically involved in 1968 with Lynn's replacement Patricia Olson, who played Hilda under the stage name Sigrid Valdis. Crane divorced Terzian in 1970, just before their 21st anniversary, and married Olson on the set of the show later that year, with series co-star Richard Dawson serving as best man. The couple's son, Robert Scott "Scotty" Crane, was born in 1971, and they later adopted a daughter, Ana Marie.

Crane's son Robert David later alleged that Crane was not the biological father of any of Olson's children. When they were married in 1970, Olson was already pregnant, but Crane had had a vasectomy in 1968 while he was still married to Terzian. Crane and Olson separated in 1977, and were mere weeks away from finalizing their divorce at the time of Crane's death in June 1978.

=== After Hogan's Heroes ===
In 1968, Crane and Hogan co-stars Werner Klemperer, Leon Askin and John Banner appeared with Elke Sommer in a feature film, The Wicked Dreams of Paula Schultz, set in the divided city of Berlin during the Cold War. In 1969, Crane starred with Abby Dalton in a dinner theater production of Cactus Flower.

Following the cancellation of Hogan's Heroes in 1971, Crane appeared in two Disney films: Superdad (1973), in the title role, and a small role in Gus (1976). In 1973, Crane purchased the rights to a comedy play called Beginner's Luck and began touring it, as its star and director, at the Showboat Dinner Theatre in St. Petersburg, Florida; the La Mirada Civic Theatre in California; the Windmill Dinner Theatre in Scottsdale, Arizona; and other dinner theaters around the country.

Between theater engagements, Crane guest-starred in a number of television shows, including Police Woman, Gibbsville, Quincy, M.E. and The Love Boat. In 1975, he returned to television with his own series, The Bob Crane Show on NBC, which was cancelled after fourteen episodes.

In early 1978, Crane taped a travel documentary in Hawaii and recorded an appearance on the Canadian afternoon cooking show Celebrity Cooks; neither aired in the U.S. His appearance on Celebrity Cooks was broadcast on CBC Television five times beginning in 1978, and was dramatized in the biopic film Auto Focus. Claims that Crane had been distraught during the taping and had made inappropriate jokes about death and sex have been denied by the show's producers and production staff, who have stated that taping would have stopped or the episode cancelled if anything inappropriate had been said.

== Private life and murder ==
Crane frequently videotaped and photographed his own sexual encounters. During the run of Hogan, Dawson introduced Crane to John Henry Carpenter, a regional sales manager for Sony Electronics who often helped famous clients with their video equipment. The two men struck up a friendship and began visiting bars and nightclubs together. Crane attracted many women due to his celebrity status, and he introduced Carpenter to them as his manager. The two men videotaped their joint sexual encounters. Crane's son Scotty later insisted that all of the women were aware of the videotaping and consented to it, but several claimed that they had no idea that they had been recorded until they were informed by Scottsdale police after Crane's murder. During their friendship, Carpenter became national sales manager at the consumer electronics company Akai and arranged his business trips to coincide with Crane's touring schedule, allowing the two to continue videotaping their sexual encounters.

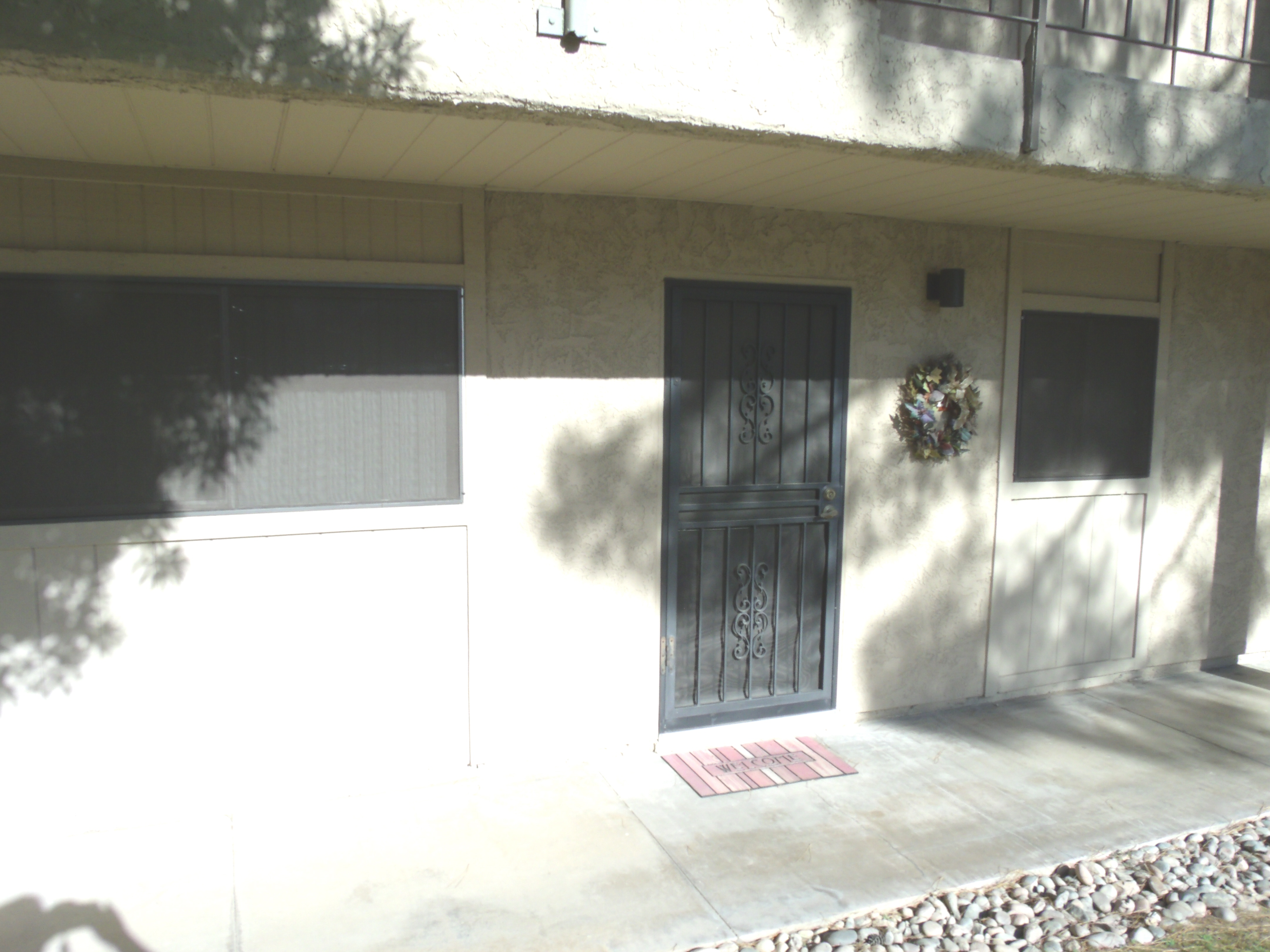
Apartment 132A of the Winfield Place Apartments (now condominiums) where Crane was murdered

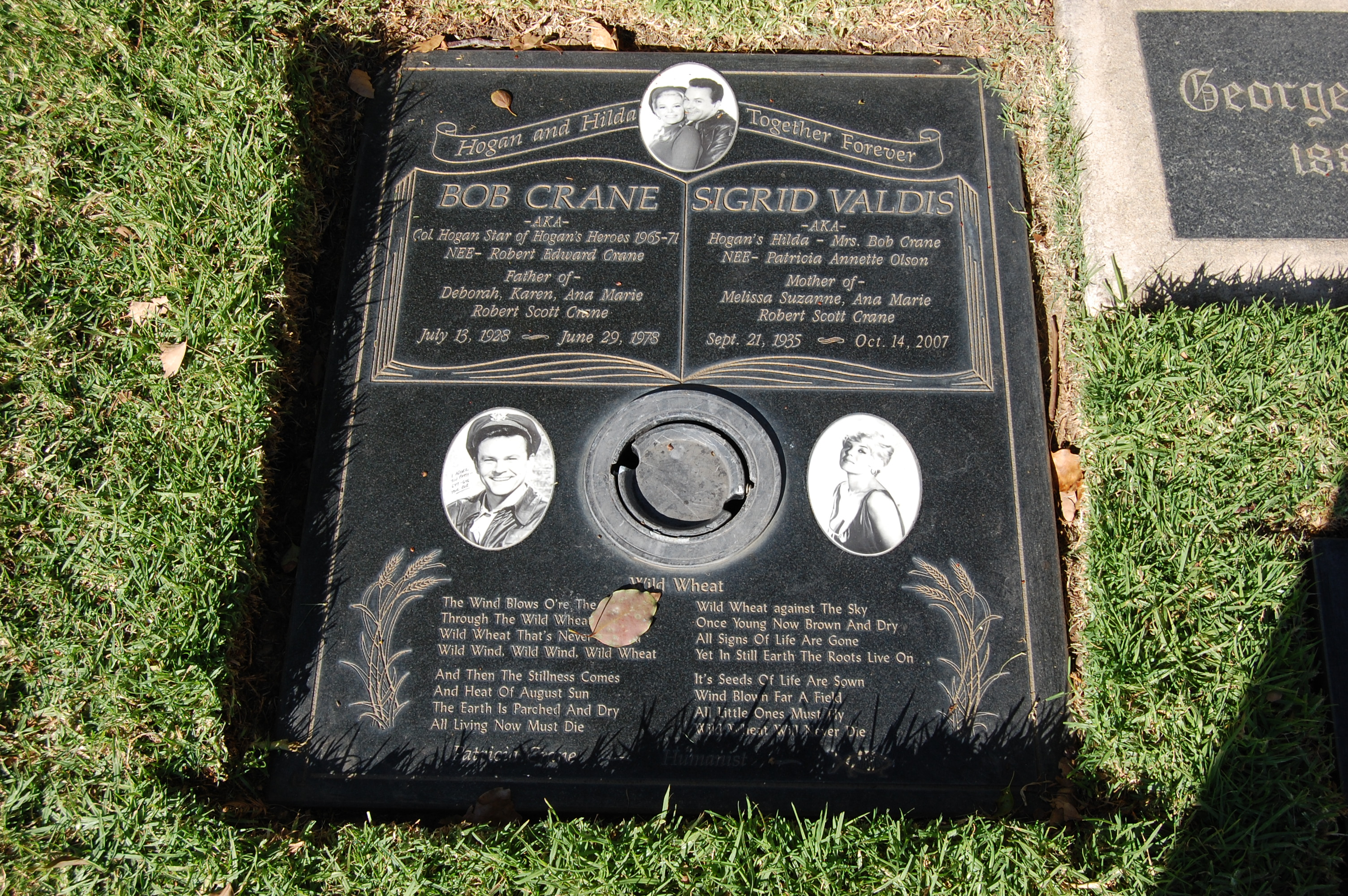
Crane and Valdis' gravestone, bearing their portraits and the banner "Hogan and Hilda, Together Forever"

In June 1978, Crane was living in the Winfield Place Apartments in Scottsdale during a run of Beginner's Luck at the Windmill Dinner Theatre. On the afternoon of June 29, his co-star Victoria Ann Berry entered his apartment after he failed to show up for a lunch meeting, and discovered his body. Crane had been bludgeoned to death with a weapon that was never identified, though investigators believed it to be a camera tripod. An electrical cord had been tied around his neck, but he showed no signs of strangulation.

Crane's funeral was held on July 5, 1978 at St. Paul the Apostle Catholic Church in Westwood, Los Angeles. An estimated 200 family members and friends attended, including John Astin, Astin's wife Patty Duke and Carroll O'Connor. Pallbearers included Hogan producer Edward Feldman, co-stars Robert Clary and Larry Hovis, and Crane's son Robert Crane Jr. He was interred in Oakwood Memorial Park Cemetery in Chatsworth, California. Olson later had his remains relocated to Westwood Village Memorial Park in Westwood, and she was buried beside him in 2007 under her stage name of Sigrid Valdis.

=== Investigation ===
Scottsdale police had no homicide division in 1978, so it was ill-equipped to handle such a high-profile murder investigation. The crime scene yielded few clues; no evidence was found of forced entry, and nothing of value was missing. Detectives examined Crane's extensive videotape collection, which led them to Carpenter, who had flown to Phoenix on June 25 to spend a few days with Crane. Carpenter's rental car was impounded and searched. Several blood smears were found that matched Crane's blood type; no one else of that blood type was known to have been in the car, including Carpenter. DNA testing was not yet available, and the Maricopa County district attorney declined to file charges.

In 1990, Scottsdale police investigator Barry Vassall and Maricopa County Attorney's Office investigator Jim Raines re-examined the evidence from 1978 and persuaded the county attorney to reopen the case. DNA testing was inconclusive on the blood found in Carpenter's rental car, but Raines discovered an evidence photograph of the car's interior that appeared to show a piece of brain tissue. The actual tissue samples recovered from the car had been lost, but an Arizona judge ruled that the new evidence was admissible. In June 1992, Carpenter was arrested and charged with Crane's murder.

=== Trial ===
At the 1994 trial, Crane's son Robert David testified that Crane had repeatedly expressed a desire to terminate his friendship with Carpenter in the weeks before his death. He said that Carpenter had become "a hanger-on" and "a nuisance to the point of being obnoxious." "My dad expressed that he just didn't need Carpenter kind of hanging around him anymore," he said. Robert David further testified that Crane had called Carpenter the night before the murder to end their friendship.

Carpenter's attorneys attacked the prosecution's case as circumstantial and inconclusive. They presented evidence that Carpenter and Crane were still on good terms, including witnesses from the restaurant where the two men had dined the evening before the murder. They noted that the murder weapon had never been identified or found; the prosecution's camera tripod theory was sheer speculation, they said, based solely on Carpenter's occupation. They disputed the claim that the newly discovered evidence photo showed brain tissue, and alleged that the police work had been sloppy, such as the mishandling and misplacing of evidence—including the crucial tissue sample itself. They pointed out that Crane had been videotaped and photographed in sexual relations with numerous women, implying that any one of them might have been the killer. Other potential suspects proposed by Carpenter's attorneys included angry husbands and boyfriends of the women, and an actor who had sworn vengeance after a violent argument with Crane in Texas several months earlier.

Carpenter was acquitted, and he continued to maintain his innocence until his death in 1998.

After the trial, Crane's son Robert David speculated publicly that Patricia Olson might have had a role in instigating the crime. "Nobody got a dime out of [the murder]," he said, "except for one person," alluding to Crane's will, which left his entire estate to Olson while excluding him, his siblings and his mother. Robert David repeated his suspicions in the 2015 book Crane: Sex, Celebrity, and My Father's Unsolved Murder. Maricopa County District Attorney Rick Romley responded "We never characterized Patty as a suspect," adding "I am convinced John Carpenter murdered Bob Crane." Officially, Crane's murder remains unsolved.

=== Later DNA testing ===
In November 2016, the Maricopa County Attorney's Office permitted Phoenix television reporter John Hook to submit the 1978 blood samples from Carpenter's rental car for retesting, using a more advanced DNA technique than the one used in 1990. Two sequences were identified, one from an unknown male, and the other was too degraded to reach a conclusion.

This testing consumed all of the remaining DNA from the rental car, making further tests impossible. Hook's investigation turned up two blood vials, samples from Crane and Carpenter, located in evidence storage at the Maricopa County Attorney's Office. Carpenter had voluntarily given a sample to Scottsdale police when he was questioned in 1978. Crane's blood vial was recovered during his autopsy the day after the murder. Both were used as comparison samples for Hook's DNA tests on the blood stains found in Carpenter's rental car.

== Auto Focus ==
Crane's life and murder were the subject of the 2002 feature film Auto Focus, directed by Paul Schrader and starring Greg Kinnear as Crane. The film is based on the book The Murder of Bob Crane by author Robert Graysmith and was described as "brilliant" by critic Roger Ebert. It portrays Crane as a happily married, church-going family man who succumbs to Hollywood's celebrity lifestyle after becoming a television star. He meets Carpenter, played by Willem Dafoe, and learns about the new home video technology. He subsequently descends into a life of strip clubs, BDSM, and sex addiction.

Scotty challenged the film's accuracy in an October 2002 review. "During the last twelve years of his life," he wrote, "[Crane] went to church three times: when I was baptized, when his father died, and when he was buried." Scotty further stated that Crane was a sex addict long before he became a celebrity, and that he may have begun recording his sexual encounters as early as 1956. There was no evidence, he said, that Crane engaged in BDSM; there were no such scenes in any of his hundreds of home movies, and Schrader admitted that the film's BDSM scene was based on his own experience while writing his earlier film Hardcore (1979). Before production on Auto Focus was announced, Scotty and Olson had tried to sell a rival script titled F-Stop or Take Off Your Clothes and Smile, but interest ceased after Auto Focus was announced.

In June 2001, Scotty launched the bobcrane.com website, which remained active as late as May 2017. It included a paid section featuring photographs, out-takes from his father's sex films and Crane's autopsy report that proved, he said, that his father did not have a penile implant as stated in Auto Focus. Explicit photographs and videos from Crane's private archive could also be purchased for a monthly subscription fee of $19.95. The site was renamed "Bob Crane: The Official Web Site", but is now abandoned. An "Official Licensing Website of Bob Crane" was maintained by CMG Worldwide elsewhere on the internet; it was active as late as February 2023, but the website is now defunct.

== Filmography ==
=== Film ===
Year	Title	Role	Notes
1961	Return to Peyton Place	Peter White	Uncredited
1961	Man-Trap	Ralph Turner	
1964	The New Interns	Drunken prankster at baby shower	Uncredited
1968	The Wicked Dreams of Paula Schultz	Bill Mason	
1972	Patriotism	Narrator	Short film
1973	Superdad	Charlie McCready	
1976	Gus	Pepper	Final film role

=== Television ===
Year	Title	Role	Notes
1953	General Electric Theater		Episode: "Ride the River"
1959	Picture Window	Jerry McEvoy	Unaired pilot
1961	The Twilight Zone	Disc jockey	Episode: "Static", uncredited
1961	General Electric Theater	Harry	Episode: "The $200 Parlay"
1962	The Dick Van Dyke Show	Harry Rogers	Episode: "Somebody Has to Play Cleopatra"
1963	The Alfred Hitchcock Hour	Charlie Lessing	Season 1 Episode 15: "The Thirty-First of February"
1963	Channing	Prof. Arlen	Episode: "A Hall Full of Strangers"
1963–1965	The Donna Reed Show	Dr. Dave Kelsey	62 episodes
1965–1971	Hogan's Heroes	Col. Robert E. Hogan	168 episodes
1966	The Lucy Show	Himself	Episode: "Lucy and Bob Crane"
1966	Password	Himself	Game show contestant / celebrity guest star
1967	The Green Hornet	Uncredited (non-speaking role)	Episode: "Corpse of the Year, Part 1"
1967	The Red Skelton Show	Col. Hogan	Episode: "Freddie's Heroes"
1969	Arsenic and Old Lace	Mortimer Brewster	Television film
1969	Love, American Style	Howard Melville	Episode: "Love and the Modern Wife"
1971	Love, American Style	Mark	Episode: "Love and the Logical Explanation"
1971	Love, American Style		Episode: "Love and the Waitress"
1971	The Doris Day Show	Bob Carter	Episode: "And Here's... Doris"
1971	Night Gallery	Ellis Travers	Episode: "House – with Ghost"
1972	The Delphi Bureau	Charlie Taggart	Television pilot
1974	Tenafly	Sid Pierce	Episode: "Man Running"
1974	Tattletales	Himself	Game show contestant / celebrity guest star
1974	Police Woman	Larry Brooks	Episode: "Requiem for Bored Wives'
1975	The Bob Crane Show	Bob Wilcox	14 episodes
1976	Joe Forrester	Alban	Episode: "The Invaders"
1976	Ellery Queen	Jerry Crabtree	Episode: "The Adventure of the Hardhearted Huckster"
1976	Spencer's Pilots	Cozens	Episode: "The Search"
1976	Gibbsville	Lawyer	Episode: "Trapped"
1977	Quincy, M.E.	Dr. Jamison	Episode: "Has Anybody Here Seen Quincy?"
1977	The Hardy Boys/Nancy Drew Mysteries	Danny Day	Episode: "A Haunting We Will Go"
1978	The Love Boat	Edward "Teddy" Anderson	Episode: "Too Hot to Handle/Family Reunion/Cinderella Story" (final US television appearance)
1978	Celebrity Cooks	Himself	Episode: "Chicken A La Hogan`s Heroes". Guest on daytime cooking show, aired nationally in Canada on CBC Television (final television appearance)

== Awards and honors ==
Year	Award	Category	Title of work	Nominated/Won
1966	Primetime Emmy Award	Outstanding Lead Actor in a Comedy Series	Hogan's Heroes	Nominated
1967	Primetime Emmy Award	Outstanding Lead Actor in a Comedy Series	Hogan's Heroes	Nominated
