= Sigrid Valdis =

American actress (1935–2007)

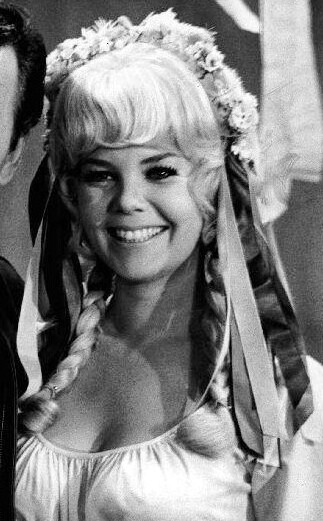
- Valdis on Hogan's Heroes in 1969
- Born: Patricia Annette Olson; September 21, 1935; Bakersfield, California, U.S.
- Died: October 14, 2007 (aged 72); Anaheim, California, U.S.
- Resting place: Westwood Memorial Park
- Occupation: Actress
- Years active: 1957–1970
- Spouses: George Gilbert Ateyeh (m. 1958; died 1967) Bob Crane (m. 1970; died 1978)
- Children: 3

Patricia Annette Olson (September 21, 1935 – October 14, 2007), known by her stage name Sigrid Valdis, was an American actress best known for playing "Hilda" in the television series Hogan's Heroes.

== Early life and career ==
Valdis was born in Bakersfield, California. She began acting in the late 1950s. She appeared in bit parts in films and guest starred in several television shows including The Wild Wild West and Kraft Television Theatre. She appeared in one episode of Hogan's Heroes as a different character before landing the role of Hilda, Colonel Klink's secretary, replacing Cynthia Lynn ("Helga") who had played the role of Klink's secretary in the first season.

== Personal life ==
Valdis was married twice. Her first marriage was to fashion businessman George Gilbert Ateyeh, with whom she had a daughter, Melissa. Ateyeh died in 1967.

Valdis' second marriage was to Hogan's Heroes star Bob Crane on the set of the series on October 16, 1970. Co-star Richard Dawson served as Crane's best man. Following the birth of their son Robert Scott Crane in 1971, Valdis retired from acting. However, the claim of Crane being the biological father of Robert Scott has been challenged, with Crane confirmed to have had a vasectomy in 1968. Valdis and Crane separated in 1977, and were merely weeks away from having a planned divorce finalized at the time of Crane's death. In 1978, she moved from the Los Angeles area after Crane was murdered.

In 1980, she moved to Seattle, where in 1998 she joined the cast of her son's syndicated weekly sketch comedy radio show, Shaken, Not Stirred. In 2004, she moved back to her childhood home in Westwood. Though no longer using her stage name, she later oversaw a tribute website to her husband, with a blog where she answered questions from fans of her husband and Hogan's Heroes.

== Death ==
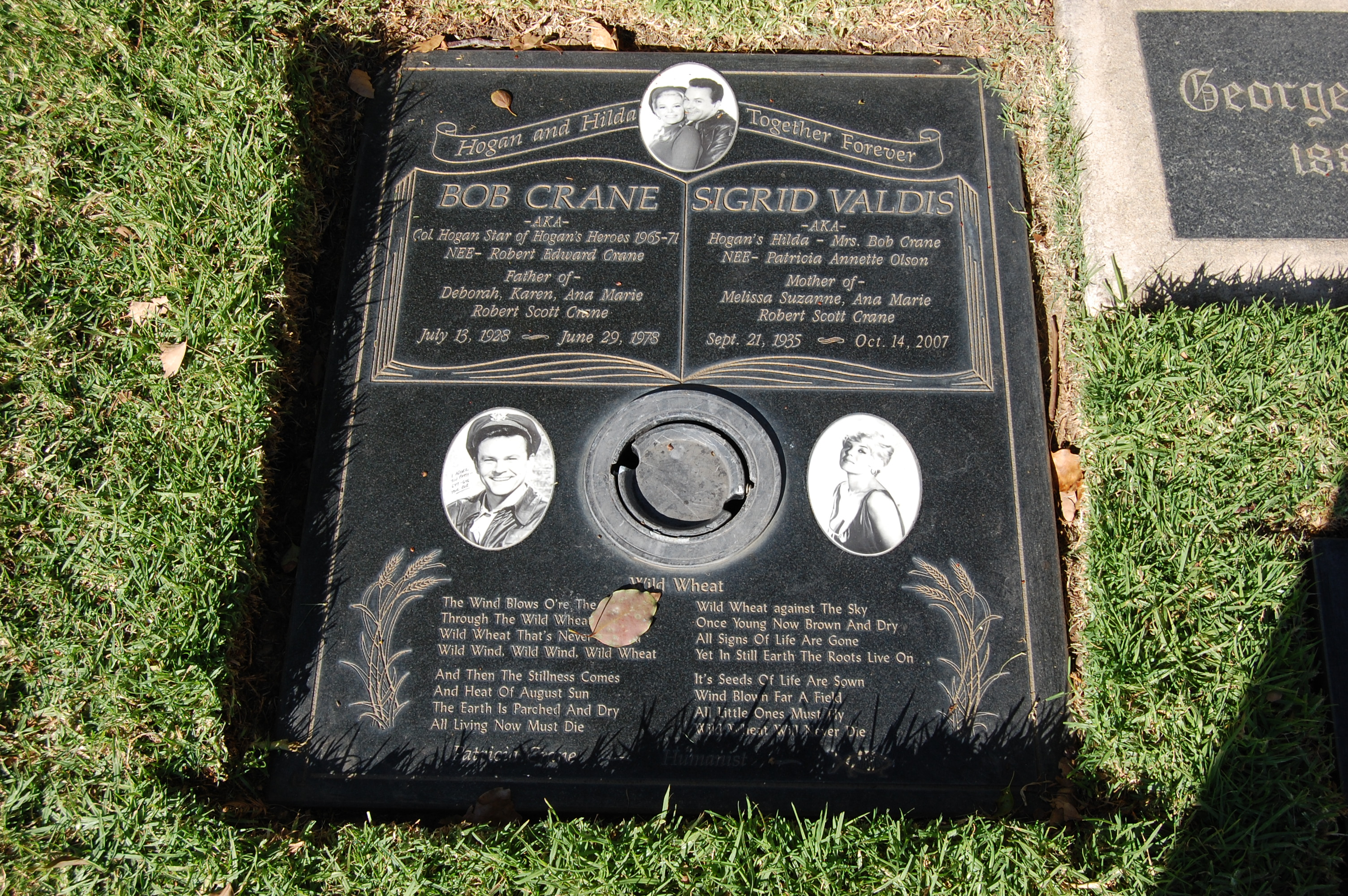
Grave of Bob Crane and Sigrid Valdis in Westwood Village Memorial Park Cemetery

Twice widowed, Valdis died on October 14, 2007, from lung cancer in Anaheim, California, aged 72. She had two daughters, Melissa Smith and Ana Sarmiento, and a son, Scott. She had three stepchildren from Crane's earlier marriage to Anne Terzian: Karen, Deborah, and Robert David Crane.

== Filmography ==
Film
Year	Title	Role	Notes
1962	Two Tickets to Paris	Young woman	Uncredited
1965	Marriage on the Rocks	Kitty	
1966	Our Man Flint	Anna	
1967	The Venetian Affair		Uncredited
Television
Year	Title	Role	Notes
1964	Kraft Suspense Theatre	Ruby	1 episode
1965	The Wild Wild West	Miss Piecemeal	2 episodes
1965	Hogan's Heroes	Gretchen	1 episode
1966–1971	Hogan's Heroes	Hilda	43 episodes
