= Willem Dafoe on stage and screen =

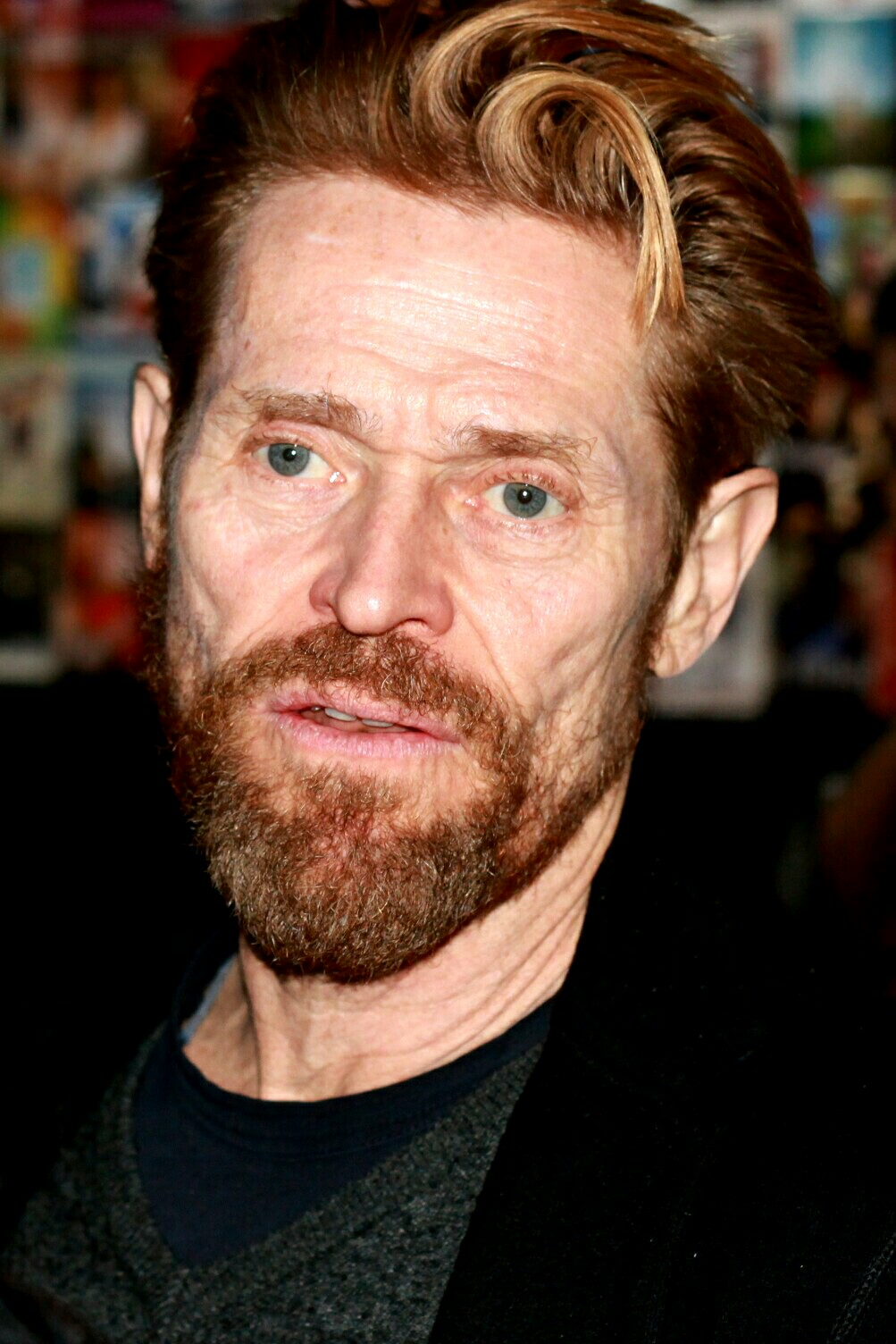
- Dafoe in 2017
- Film: 136
- Television series: 8
- Others: 5 video games

Willem Dafoe is an American actor known for his work in To Live and Die in L.A. (1985), Platoon (1986), The Last Temptation of Christ (1988), Flight of the Intruder (1991), Speed 2: Cruise Control (1997), The Boondock Saints (1999), Shadow of the Vampire (2000), Spider-Man (2002), Finding Nemo (2003), The Life Aquatic with Steve Zissou (2004), Manderlay (2005), Antichrist (2009), The Florida Project (2017), At Eternity's Gate (2018), The Lighthouse (2019), Spider-Man: No Way Home (2021), and Poor Things (2023).

Dafoe has received multiple awards and nominations, including four Academy Award nominations and has collaborated with filmmakers such as Paul Schrader, Abel Ferrara, Kathryn Bigelow, Oliver Stone, Lars von Trier, Julian Schnabel, Wes Anderson, Robert Eggers, David Lynch, William Friedkin, and Yorgos Lanthimos.

== Film ==
| Year | Title | Role | Notes | Ref(s) |
|---|---|---|---|---|
| 1980 | Heaven's Gate | Willy | Uncredited | |
| 1981 | The Loveless | Vance | | |
| 1983 | The Hunger | 2nd Phone Booth Youth | | |
| 1984 | Streets of Fire | Raven Shaddock | | |
| 1985 | Roadhouse 66 | Johnny Harte | | |
| 1985 | To Live and Die in L.A. | Eric Masters | | |
| 1986 | Platoon | Sgt. Elias Grodin | | |
| 1987 | Dear America: Letters Home from Vietnam | Elephant Grass | Voice; Documentary | |
| 1988 | Off Limits | Buck McGriff | | |
| 1988 | The Last Temptation of Christ | Jesus | | |
| 1988 | Mississippi Burning | FBI Agent Alan Ward | | |
| 1989 | Triumph of the Spirit | Salamo Arouch | | |
| 1989 | Born on the Fourth of July | Charlie | | |
| 1990 | Cry-Baby | Hateful Guard | | |
| 1990 | Wild at Heart | Bobby Peru | | |
| 1991 | Flight of the Intruder | Lieutenant Commander Virgil Cole | | |
| 1991 | Arrive Alive | Mickey Crews | Unfinished film | |
| 1992 | Light Sleeper | John LeTour | | |
| 1992 | White Sands | Ray Dolezal | | |
| 1992 | Body of Evidence | Frank Dulaney | | |
| 1993 | Faraway, So Close! | Emit Flesti | | |
| 1994 | Tom & Viv | T.S. Eliot | | |
| 1994 | Clear and Present Danger | John Clark | | |
| 1994 | The Night and the Moment | The Writer | | |
| 1996 | Victory | Axel Heyst | | |
| 1996 | Basquiat | The Electrician | | |
| 1996 | The English Patient | David Caravaggio | | |
| 1997 | Speed 2: Cruise Control | John Geiger | | |
| 1997 | Affliction | Rolfe Whitehouse | | |
| 1998 | Lulu on the Bridge | Dr. Van Horn | | |
| 1998 | New Rose Hotel | X | Also co-producer | |
| 1999 | Existenz | Gas | | |
| 1999 | The Boondock Saints | Paul Smecker | | |
| 2000 | American Psycho | Donald Kimball | | |
| 2000 | Animal Factory | Earl Copen | | |
| 2000 | Shadow of the Vampire | Max Schreck / Count Orlok | | |
| 2000 | Bullfighter | Father Ramirez | | |
| 2001 | Pavilion of Women | Father Andre | | |
| 2001 | Edges of the Lord | Priest | | |
| 2002 | Spider-Man | Norman Osborn / Green Goblin | | |
| 2002 | Auto Focus | John Henry Carpenter | | |
| 2003 | Finding Nemo | Gill | Voice | |
| 2003 | Once Upon a Time in Mexico | Armando Barillo | | |
| 2004 | The Reckoning | Martin | | |
| 2004 | The Clearing | Arnold Mack | | |
| 2004 | Spider-Man 2 | Norman Osborn / Green Goblin | Cameo | |
| 2004 | Jiminy Glick in Lalawood | Himself | | |
| 2004 | The Life Aquatic with Steve Zissou | Klaus Daimler | | |
| 2004 | Control | Dr. Michael Copeland | | |
| 2004 | The Aviator | Roland Sweet | | |
| 2005 | XXX: State of the Union | General George Deckert | | |
| 2005 | Manderlay | Grace's Father | | |
| 2005 | Before It Had a Name | Leslie | Also co-writer | |
| 2005 | Ripley Under Ground | Neil Murchison | | |
| 2006 | American Dreamz | Chief of Staff | | |
| 2006 | Inside Man | Captain John Darius | | |
| 2006 | Paris, je t'aime | Le Cowboy | Segment: "Place des Victoires" | |
| 2007 | The Walker | Larry Lockner | | |
| 2007 | Mr. Bean's Holiday | Carson Clay | | |
| 2007 | Spider-Man 3 | Norman Osborn / Green Goblin | Cameo | |
| 2007 | Tales from Earthsea | Cob | Voice; English dub | |
| 2007 | Go Go Tales | Ray Ruby | | |
| 2007 | Anamorph | Stan Aubrey | | |
| 2008 | Fireflies in the Garden | Charles Taylor | | |
| 2008 | Adam Resurrected | Commandant Klein | | |
| 2008 | The Dust of Time | A | | |
| 2009 | Antichrist | He | | |
| 2009 | Farewell | Feeney | | |
| 2009 | My Son, My Son, What Have Ye Done | Det. Hank Havenhurst | | |
| 2009 | Daybreakers | Lionel 'Elvis' Cormac | | |
| 2009 | Fantastic Mr. Fox | Rat | Voice | |
| 2009 | The Boondock Saints II: All Saints Day | Paul Smecker | Uncredited Cameo | |
| 2009 | Cirque du Freak: The Vampire's Assistant | Gavner Purl | | |
| 2010 | Miral | Eddie | | |
| 2010 | A Woman | Max Oliver | | |
| 2011 | 4:44 Last Day on Earth | Cisco | | |
| 2011 | The Hunter | Martin David | | |
| 2012 | John Carter | Tars Tarkas | Motion-capture performance | |
| 2012 | Tomorrow You're Gone | The Buddha | | |
| 2013 | Odd Thomas | Chief Wyatt Porter | | |
| 2013 | Out of the Furnace | John Petty | | |
| 2013 | Nymphomaniac | L | | |
| 2014 | A Most Wanted Man | Tommy Brue | | |
| 2014 | The Grand Budapest Hotel | Jopling | | |
| 2014 | Bad Country | Bud Carter | | |
| 2014 | The Fault in Our Stars | Peter Van Houten | | |
| 2014 | Pasolini | Pier Paolo Pasolini | | |
| 2014 | John Wick | Marcus | | |
| 2015 | My Hindu Friend | Diego Fairman | | |
| 2016 | Padre | James Verdun | | |
| 2016 | Dog Eat Dog | 'Mad Dog' | | |
| 2016 | Finding Dory | Gill | Voice cameo | |
| 2016 | A Family Man | Ed Blackridge | | |
| 2016 | Sculpt | Man | | |
| 2016 | The Great Wall | Ballard | | |
| 2017 | The Florida Project | Bobby Hicks | | |
| 2017 | What Happened to Monday | Terrence Settman | | |
| 2017 | Mountain | Narrator | Voice; Documentary | |
| 2017 | Death Note | Ryuk | Voice | |
| 2017 | Murder on the Orient Express | Gerhard Hardman | | |
| 2017 | Opus Zero | Paul | | |
| 2018 | At Eternity's Gate | Vincent van Gogh | | |
| 2018 | Vox Lux | Narrator | Voice | |
| 2018 | Aquaman | Vulko | | |
| 2019 | Birds of a Feather | Yves | Voice | |
| 2019 | The Lighthouse | Thomas Wake | | |
| 2019 | Tommaso | Tommaso | | |
| 2019 | Babenco: Tell Me When I Die | Himself | Documentary; also associate producer | |
| 2019 | Motherless Brooklyn | Paul Randolph | | |
| 2019 | Togo | Leonhard Seppala | | |
| 2020 | The Last Thing He Wanted | Dick McMahon | | |
| 2020 | Siberia | Clint | | |
| 2020 | Sportin' Life | Himself | Documentary | |
| 2021 | Zack Snyder's Justice League | Vulko | Director's cut of Justice League | |
| 2021 | The French Dispatch | Albert the Abacus | | |
| 2021 | The Card Counter | Major John Gordo | | |
| 2021 | Nightmare Alley | Clem Hoately | | |
| 2021 | Spider-Man: No Way Home | Norman Osborn / Green Goblin | | |
| 2021 | River | Narrator | Voice; Documentary | |
| 2022 | The Northman | Heimir the Fool | | |
| 2022 | Dead for a Dollar | Joe Cribbens | | |
| 2023 | Inside | Nemo | | |
| 2023 | Asteroid City | Saltzburg Keitel | | |
| 2023 | Poor Things | Dr. Godwin Baxter | | |
| 2023 | Finally Dawn | Rufus Priori | | |
| 2023 | Pet Shop Days | Francis | | |
| 2023 | Gonzo Girl | Walker Reade | | |
| 2023 | The Boy and the Heron | Noble Pelican | Voice; English dub | |
| 2024 | Kinds of Kindness | Raymond/George/Omi | | |
| 2024 | Beetlejuice Beetlejuice | Wolf Jackson | | |
| 2024 | Saturday Night | David Tebet | | |
| 2024 | Zero | Voice on the Phone | Voice | |
| 2024 | Nosferatu | Prof. Albin Eberhart Von Franz | | |
| 2025 | The Legend of Ochi | Maxim | | |
| 2025 | The Phoenician Scheme | Knave | | |
| 2025 | The Birthday Party | Marcos Timoleon | | |
| 2025 | Late Fame | Ed Saxberger | | |
| 2025 | The Souffleur | Tenured Hotelier | | |
| 2025 | The Man in My Basement | Anniston Bennet | | |
| 2026 | Tenzing | John Hunt | | |
| 2026 | Werwulf † | Old Hunter | Post-production | |
| TBA | Time Out † | | Post-production | |
| TBA | White Lies † | | Post-production | |
| TBA | Lincoln in the Bardo † | Everly Thomas | Voice, in production | |

Key
| † | Denotes films that have not yet been released |

== Television ==
| Year | Title | Role | Notes |
|---|---|---|---|
| 1986 | The Hitchhiker | Jeffrey Hunt | Episode: "Ghostwriter" |
| 1991 | Fishing with John | Himself | Segment: "Ice Fishing in Northern Maine" |
| 1997, 2014 | The Simpsons | The Commandant / Mr. Lassen (voices) | 2 episodes |
| 2002 | Globehunters | Hunter (voice) | Television film |
| 2010 | American Experience | Narrator (voice) | Episode: "Into the Deep: America, Whaling & the World" |
| 2017 | Piigs | Narrator (voice) | Documentary |
| 2022 | Finding Satoshi | Narrator (voice) | Documentary |
| 2022 | Saturday Night Live | Himself / various | Episodes: "Will Forte/Måneskin", "Willem Dafoe/Katy Perry" |
| 2022 | The Kingdom | Grand Duc | 3 episodes |

== Stage ==
| Year | Title | Role(s) | Venue | Notes | Ref. |
|---|---|---|---|---|---|
| 1975–1976 | The Razor Blade | Performer | North American and Netherlands Tours | | |
| 1975 | Civil Commitment Hearings | Performer | Milwaukee, Wisconsin | | |
| 1975 | Offending the Audience | Speaker | Milwaukee, Wisconsin | | |
| 1975 | Sakonnet Point | Assistant with Sheet | Wooster Group Performing Garage | | |
| 1976 | Folter Follies | Performer | Mickery Theatre, Amsterdam | | |
| 1978–1979 | Nayatt School | Assistant with Recorder | Wooster Group Performing Garage | Also construction team | |
| 1979–1982 | Point Judith (an epilog) | B.B. Nettleson / Mary / Sister Muriel | The Envelope, New York City; World Tour | | |
| 1981–1987 | Route 1 & 9 (The Last Act) | Performer | World tour | | |
| 1983 | North Atlantic | Colonel Lloyd "Ned" Lud (A.A.) | Globe Theater, Eindhoven | | |
| 1983–1990 | L.S.D. | John Proctor / Jack Kerouac / John Webster / Jackie Leary / Betsy Perry | Wooster Group Performing Garage; World tour | | |
| 1984 | North Atlantic | Colonel Lloyd "Ned" Lud (A.A.) | Wooster Group Performing Garage | | |
| 1985 | North Atlantic | Colonel Lloyd "Ned" Lud (A.A.) | National Theatre, Washington, D.C. | | |
| 1987 | Frank Dell's The Temptation of St. Antony | Performer | Wooster Group Performing Garage | | |
| 1988 | North Atlantic | Colonel Lloyd "Ned" Lud (A.A.) | Wooster Group Performing Garage | | |
| 1990–1991 | Brace Up! | Andrei Sergeyevich Prozorov | Wooster Group Performing Garage; World tour | | |
| 1992–1994 | The Emperor Jones | Smithers | Wooster Group Performing Garage; World Tour | | |
| 1994 | Frank Dell's The Temptation of St. Antony | Frank Dell | Hebbel-Theater, Berlin | | |
| 1995 | The Hairy Ape | Yank | Wooster Group Performing Garage | | |
| 1996 | Fish Story | Performer | William Shakespeare Theater, Bogotá, Colombia | | |
| 1996 | Fish Story | Performer | Kaaitheater, Brussels, Belgium | | |
| 1997 | The Hairy Ape | Yank | Selwyn Theatre, Broadway; European tour | | |
| 1999–2000 | North Atlantic | Captain N.I. Roscoe Chizzum | Wooster Group Performing Garage | | |
| 2001 | The Hairy Ape | Yank | Melbourne Festival | | |
| 2001 | The Hairy Ape | Yank | Festival d'Automne, Paris | | |
| 2001–2003 | To You, The Birdie | Theseus | Wooster Group Performing Garage; World tour | | |
| 2003 | Brace Up! | Colonel Alexander Ignatyevich Vershinin | St. Ann's Warehouse, New York | | |
| 2003 | Poor Theare | Performer | Wooster Group Performing Garage | | |
| 2009 | Idiot Savant | Idiot Savant | The Public Theater | | |
| 2011 | The Life and Death of Marina Abramovic | Narrator | The Lowry, Manchester | | |
| 2013 | The Life and Death of Marina Abramovic | Narrator | Park Avenue Armory, New York | | |
| 2013 | The Old Woman | Performer | Palace Theatre, Manchester | | |
| 2014 | The Old Woman | Performer | Brooklyn Academy of Music | | |
| 2014 | The Old Woman | Performer | Zellerbach Hall, Berkeley, California | | |
| 2016 | The Minister's Black Veil | Reverend Hooper | DeSingel, Antwerp, Belgium | | |
| 2025 | Biennale Teatro 2025 | —N/a | Venice | Artistic Director | |
| 2025 | No Title (An Experiment) | Performer | Venetian Arsenal, Venice | | |
| 2026 | Biennale Teatro 2026 | —N/a | Venice | Artistic Director | |

== Video games ==
| Year | Title | Role | Notes |
|---|---|---|---|
| 2002 | Spider-Man | Norman Osborn / The Green Goblin (voice) | Also likeness |
| 2003 | Finding Nemo | Gill (voice) | |
| 2004 | James Bond 007: Everything or Nothing | Nikolai Diavolo (voice) | Also likeness |
| 2013 | Beyond: Two Souls | Nathan Dawkins (voice) | Also motion capture and likeness |
| 2021 | Twelve Minutes | Cop (voice) | |

== Music videos ==
| Year | Title | Role | Notes |
|---|---|---|---|
| 2013 | Antony and the Johnsons: "Cut the World" | Himself | |
| 2025 | GAMMAGAMMA: "Avrio Vrady" | Himself | |

== Audiobook narration ==
- The Langoliers from Four Past Midnight by Stephen King
- Suddenly, A Knock on the Door by Etgar Keret
- The Essential Stories by T.S. Eliot
