= Defoe =

Defoe may refer to:

== People ==
- Defoe (surname), most notably English author Daniel Defoe

== Places ==
- Defoe, Webster County, West Virginia, an unincorporated community

== Other uses ==
- Defoe (comics), a zombie story
- Defoe Shipbuilding Company, a former shipyard in Bay City, Michigan
- Operation Defoe, a Second World War reconnaissance by the British Special Air Service
- Defoe (horse) (2014–2020), Thoroughbred racehorse

== See also ==
- Dafoe (disambiguation)
- Foe (disambiguation)
