= Dafoe =

Dafoe is a surname of French origin. It may be a variation of Foe or Fow or an Anglicized form of a French name, possibly Thevoz, de Vaux or Devaux, Dufau or Dufou. Notable people with the surname include:

- Allan Roy Dafoe (1883–1943), Canadian obstetrician
- Byron Dafoe (born 1971), Canadian hockey player
- Charles Dafoe (1901–1942), American politician and attorney from Nebraska
- Colin Scott Dafoe (1909–1969), Canadian surgeon
- Donald Dafoe, American surgeon and research scientist, brother of Willem
- Frances Dafoe (1929–2016), Canadian figure skater
- John Wesley Dafoe (1866–1944), Canadian journalist
- Willem Dafoe (born 1955), American film and stage actor, brother of Donald

== See also ==
- Defoe (disambiguation)
- Defoe (surname)
- DeFeo
