= Foe (disambiguation) =

A foe is an enemy.

Foe or FOE may also refer to:

== People ==
- Greg Foe (born 1991), Samoan rugby player
- Manga Foe-Ondoa (born 2005), French footballer
- Marc-Vivien Foé (1975–2003), Cameroonian football midfielder
- Victoria Foe (born 1945), American developmental biologist
- Frances Tiafoe (born 1998), American tennis player nicknamed "Big Foe" or "Foe"

== Arts and entertainment ==
=== Literature ===
- Foe (Coetzee novel), a 1986 novel by J. M. Coetzee
- Foe (Reid novel), a 2018 novel by Iain Reid

=== Film and TV ===
- Foe (film), a 2023 film based on the Reid novel
- "Foe" (Person of Interest), an episode of the American TV drama series Person of Interest

=== Music ===
- Foe (EP), a 2003 EP by the German band Blackmail
- Haruomi Hosono#Bands and collaborations, F.O.E., Friends of Earth, a collective of various artists centering around Haruomi Hosono

=== Other ===
- Foes (RuneQuest), a 1980 supplement for the role-playing game RuneQuest

== Companies and organizations ==
- Friends of the Earth, a network of environmental organizations
- Fred. Olsen Energy, a Norwegian offshore driller
- Fraternal Order of Eagles, international fraternal order

== Other uses ==
- Topeka Regional Airport (IATA airport code: FOE) in Kansas, United States
- Foe (unit), a unit of energy used in astrophysics
- Foe language, spoken in Papua New Guinea
- Prix Marc-Vivien Foé (Foé Prize) for the best African nationals player in Ligue 1

== See also ==
- U-Foes, Marvel Comics supervillain team
- PHO (disambiguation)
- Defoe (disambiguation)
- Friend or Foe (disambiguation)
