= FEO =

Feo, FEO, or similar may refer to:

== People ==
- Feo Aladag (born 1972), Australian film director and actor
- Francesco Feo (1691–1761), Italian composer
- Frutos Feo (born 1972), Spanish athlete
- Giacomo Feo (c. 1471–1495), second husband of Caterina Sforza

== Other uses ==
- F. E. Osborne Junior High School, in Calgary, Alberta, Canada
- Firearms Enquiry Officer, a civilian member of British police forces
- Front end optimization, a technique of dynamic site acceleration in website management
- Iron(II) oxide (FeO)
- Wüstite, a mineral form of iron(II) oxide

== See also ==
- DeFeo
