= Willem Dafoe =

American actor (born 1955)

- Dafoe in 2025
- Born: William James Dafoe; July 22, 1955 (age 71); Appleton, Wisconsin, U.S.
- Citizenship: United States; Italy
- Occupation: Actor
- Years active: 1975–present
- Works: Full list
- Spouse: Giada Colagrande (m. 2005)
- Partner: Elizabeth LeCompte (1977–2004)
- Children: 1
- Relatives: Donald Dafoe (brother)
- Awards: Full list

William James "Willem" Dafoe (/dəˈfoʊ/ də-FOH; born July 22, 1955) is an American actor. Known for his prolific career portraying diverse roles on stage and screen, he is the recipient of various accolades including a Volpi Cup Award for Best Actor, with nominations for four Academy Awards, a BAFTA Award, and four Golden Globe Awards. He received an Honorary Golden Bear in 2018.

Born in Appleton, Wisconsin, Dafoe made his film debut with an uncredited role in Heaven's Gate (1980). He is known for collaborating with both mainstream and auteur filmmakers such as Paul Schrader, Abel Ferrara, Lars von Trier, Julian Schnabel, Wes Anderson, and Robert Eggers. He received Academy Award nominations for playing a compassionate army sergeant in the war drama Platoon (1986), Max Schreck in the mystery film Shadow of the Vampire (2000), a kindly motel manager in the coming of age film The Florida Project (2017), and Vincent van Gogh in the biopic At Eternity's Gate (2018).

He portrayed Jesus Christ in Martin Scorsese's The Last Temptation of Christ (1988) and Norman Osborn in Sam Raimi's Spider-Man film trilogy (2002–2007), reprising the role in Spider-Man: No Way Home (2021). He has also voiced roles in the animated films Finding Nemo (2003) and Fantastic Mr. Fox (2009). His other film credits include Streets of Fire (1984), To Live and Die in L.A. (1985), Mississippi Burning (1988), Born on the Fourth of July (1989), Wild at Heart (1990), Light Sleeper (1992), The English Patient (1996), The Boondock Saints (1999), American Psycho (2000), Animal Factory (2000), The Life Aquatic with Steve Zissou (2004), Inside Man (2006), Antichrist (2009), The Hunter (2011), The Grand Budapest Hotel (2014), John Wick (2014), Aquaman (2018), The Lighthouse (2019), Togo (2019), Poor Things (2023), Nosferatu (2024), and Tenzing (2026).

A lifelong performer in experimental theatre, Dafoe founded the experimental theatre company The Wooster Group in 1975.

== Early life and education ==
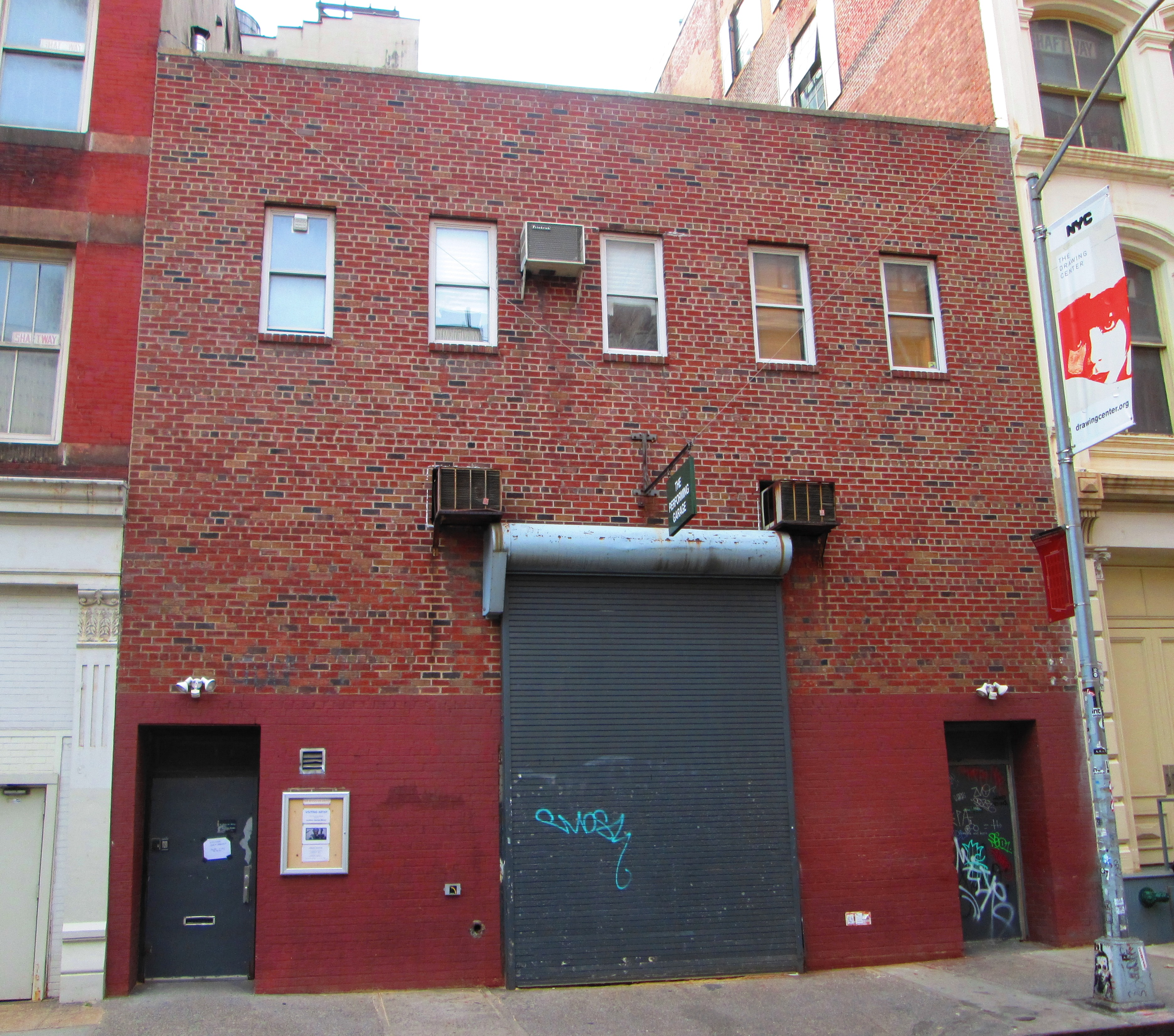
The Performing Garage, where Dafoe joined The Wooster Group

Dafoe was born on July 22, 1955, in Appleton, Wisconsin, to Muriel Isabel (née Sprissler; 1921–2012) and Dr. William Alfred Dafoe (1917–2014). He recalled in 2009, "My five sisters raised me because my father was a surgeon, my mother was a nurse and they worked together, so I didn't see either of them much." His brother, Donald, is a surgeon and research scientist. His surname, Dafoe, is the anglicized version of the Swiss-French surname Thévou. Half of his family pronounced Dafoe as /ˈdeɪfoʊ/ DAY-foh, while half pronounced it /dəˈfoʊ/ də-FOH; he used the former early in his career, but ultimately settled with the latter pronunciation. In high school, he acquired the nickname Willem, the Dutch version of the name William. He later grew more accustomed to it than his birth name. He was raised in a Christian household.

After attending Appleton East High School until 1973, Dafoe studied drama at the University of Wisconsin–Milwaukee, and left after 18 months to join the experimental theater company Theatre X in Milwaukee, before moving to New York City in 1976. He apprenticed under Richard Schechner, the director of the avant-garde theater troupe The Performance Group, where he met and became romantically involved with director Elizabeth LeCompte. Following tensions between Schechner and other members after they started staging their own productions outside of the group, Schechner left and the remaining members (including LeCompte and her ex-boyfriend Spalding Gray) renamed themselves The Wooster Group. Dafoe joined the new company and is credited as one of its co-founders. He continued his work with the group into the 2000s, well after establishing himself as a mainstream film star.

== Career ==
=== 1980–1985: Early roles ===
Dafoe made his film debut in a supporting role in Michael Cimino's 1980 epic Western film Heaven's Gate. Dafoe was present for the first three months of an eight-month shoot. His role, that of a cockfighter who works for Jeff Bridges' character, was removed from a majority of the film during editing but was visible during a cockfight scene. Dafoe did not receive a credit for his work on the film. In 1982, Dafoe starred as the leader of an outlaw motorcycle club in the drama The Loveless, his first role as a leading man. The film was co-directed by Kathryn Bigelow and Monty Montgomery and paid homage to 1953 film The Wild One, starring Marlon Brando in a similar role.

Following a brief bit part in The Hunger (1983), Dafoe again played the leader of a biker gang in Walter Hill's 1984 action film Streets of Fire. His character in the film served as the main antagonist, who captures the ex-girlfriend of a mercenary, played by Diane Lane and Michael Paré, respectively. Janet Maslin of The New York Times felt there were no great performances in the film, but praised Dafoe's "perfectly villainous" face. Dafoe starred alongside Judge Reinhold in Roadhouse 66 (1985) as a pair of young men who become stranded in a town on U.S. Route 66. Later in 1985, Dafoe starred with William Petersen and John Pankow in William Friedkin's thriller To Live and Die in L.A., in which Dafoe portrays a counterfeiter named Rick Masters who is being tracked by two Secret Service agents. Film critic Roger Ebert commended his "strong" performance in the film.

=== 1986–1996: Breakthrough and acclaim ===
Dafoe's sole film release of 1986 was Oliver Stone's Vietnam War film Platoon, gaining him his widest exposure up to that point for playing the compassionate Sergeant Elias Grodin. He enjoyed the opportunity to play a heroic role and said the film gave him a chance to display his versatility, saying "I think all characters live in you. You just frame them, give them circumstances, and that character will happen." Principal photography for the film took place in the Philippines and required Dafoe to undergo boot camp training. Having been caught in the People Power Revolution during his stay in the country, he ended up on the civilian blockade of Camp Aguinaldo. Los Angeles Times writer Sheila Benson praised his performance and found it to be "particularly fine" to see Dafoe play "something other than a psychopath". At the 59th Academy Awards, Dafoe was nominated for the Academy Award for Best Supporting Actor. Dafoe provided his voice to the documentary Dear America: Letters Home from Vietnam (1987) and, in 1988, Dafoe starred in another film set during the Vietnam War, this time as Buck McGriff in the action thriller Off Limits. His second release of 1988 was Martin Scorsese's epic drama The Last Temptation of Christ, in which Dafoe portrayed Jesus. The film was adapted from the novel of the same name and depicts his struggle with various forms of temptation throughout his life. Like the novel, the film sparked controversy for departing from the biblical portrayal of Jesus and was branded as being blasphemous. Dafoe's performance in the film was widely praised, however, with Janet Maslin opining that Dafoe brought a "gleaming intensity" to the role.

In his final release of 1988, Dafoe starred opposite Gene Hackman in the crime thriller Mississippi Burning as a pair of FBI agents investigating the disappearance of three civil rights workers in fictional Jessup County, Mississippi during the civil rights movement. Variety praised Dafoe's performance, writing, "Dafoe gives a disciplined and noteworthy portrayal of Ward", although they felt it was Hackman "who steals the picture". As with The Last Temptation of Christ, the film was the subject of controversy, this time among African-American activists who criticized its fictionalization of events. Dafoe was briefly considered for the role of the super-villain the Joker in the Tim Burton-directed superhero film Batman (1989), as screenwriter Sam Hamm noticed physical similarities, but was never offered the part that eventually went to Jack Nicholson. Dafoe starred in the drama Triumph of the Spirit in 1989 as Jewish Greek boxer Salamo Arouch, an Auschwitz concentration camp inmate who was forced to fight other internees to death for the Nazi officers' entertainment. It was filmed on location at Auschwitz, the first major film to do so. While the film was negatively received, Dafoe's performance was lauded by some critics; Peter Travers of Rolling Stone felt he gave a "disciplined performance" and Janet Maslin thought he was "harrowingly good". Dafoe reunited with Platoon director Oliver Stone for a small appearance in the biographical war drama Born on the Fourth of July (1989). Dafoe played a paraplegic, wheelchair-using Vietnam veteran who befriends the film's subject Ron Kovic (played by Tom Cruise), another paraplegic veteran.

Dafoe made a cameo appearance in John Waters' musical comedy Cry-Baby (1990) as a prison guard who gives a brief lecture on values to the title character, who is played by Johnny Depp. Rita Kempley of The Washington Post found the scene to be one of the film's highlights. In the same year, Dafoe co-starred in David Lynch's crime film Wild at Heart with Nicolas Cage and Laura Dern. Dafoe played a criminal who engages in a robbery with Cage's character before demonstrating his dark side. He wore fake, corroded teeth and grew a pencil moustache that bore resemblance to his previous collaborator, John Waters. Entertainment Weekly critic Owen Gleiberman felt the role proved Dafoe as a "master of leering, fish-faced villainy". In 1991, Dafoe starred with Danny Glover and Brad Johnson in the action film Flight of the Intruder. The film follows a pair of pilots, played by Dafoe and Johnson, who scheme and participate in an unauthorized air strike on Hanoi. Directed by John Millius, the film received negative reviews. He was due to star opposite Joan Cusack in the comedy Arrive Alive in 1991, but the film was canceled during production. Dafoe had two lead roles in 1992. The first to be released, White Sands, saw Dafoe play a small-town sheriff who impersonates a dead man after finding his dead body and a suitcase containing $500,000 to solve the case, resulting in an investigation. In his next starring role, Paul Schrader's drama Light Sleeper, Dafoe played John LeTour, a lonely, insomniac, New Yorker working as a delivery man for a drug supplier, who is played by Susan Sarandon. Roger Ebert praised Dafoe's "gifted" portrayal of LeTour and Owen Gleiberman opined that "even when the film doesn't gel, one is held by Willem Dafoe's grimly compelling performance."

Dafoe next starred in the erotic thriller Body of Evidence (1993) with Madonna. The story concerns a lawyer, played by Dafoe, who engages in a sexual relationship with the woman he is representing in a murder case. The film was panned by critics and performed poorly at the box office, with some audience members laughing during the sex scenes. In his review of the film, Vincent Canby felt that Dafoe lacked sensuality in the role. Later in 1993, Dafoe appeared in a supporting role as Emit Flesti in the German fantasy film Faraway, So Close!, directed by Wim Wenders. Dafoe co-starred in the spy thriller Clear and Present Danger (1994), an adaptation of the Tom Clancy novel of the name starring Harrison Ford as operative Jack Ryan. Dafoe played John Clark, a CIA agent conducting a covert operation against a drug cartel in Colombia with Jack Ryan. Dafoe portrayed the poet T. S. Eliot in the drama Tom & Viv (also in 1994), which tells the story of Eliot and his first wife, Vivienne Haigh-Wood Eliot, who was played by Miranda Richardson. The film was met with a mixed reception from critics, although Caryn James of The New York Times felt that Dafoe's "stunningly sharp, sympathetic portrait raises the film above a script that is full of serious holes and stilted dialogue". In 1995, he played an 18th-century writer in the period drama The Night and the Moment.

In his first of three film appearances in 1996, Dafoe made a cameo appearance as an electrician in the biographical drama Basquiat. Next, he played an operative in the romantic war drama The English Patient. The English Patient was filmed in Tuscany, where Dafoe said he particularly enjoyed the "quiet moments in the monastery between shoots". In the period drama Victory—which was filmed in 1994 and premiered in Europe in 1996, but was not released until 1998—Dafoe played a European living on an island in the Southeast Asia who becomes the target of redemption after preventing a woman, played by Irène Jacob, from being raped.

=== 1997–2013: Established actor ===
"I really made a conscious effort to mix it up, not because in itself it's not the job of an actor to do all different things, but for me that's what I'm interested in. You've got to be careful because you've got to work with what you have, not just for vanity's sake, but I think the best part of being an actor sometimes is the opportunity to transform yourself superficially, and deeply."

— Dafoe on his avoidance of being typecast as a villain, 1998

In 1997, Dafoe returned to playing a villainous role in the action thriller Speed 2: Cruise Control, expressing the necessity of appearing in both independent and blockbuster films. The film starred Sandra Bullock and Jason Patric as a couple vacationing on a luxury cruise that has been hijacked by Dafoe's character, Geiger, a hacker that has programmed the ship to crash into an oil tanker. Speed 2 was met with negative reviews from critics, with Dafoe himself receiving a Razzie Award nomination for Worst Supporting Actor. For his next film, Affliction (1997), Dafoe worked with Paul Schrader for a second time, playing the brother of Nick Nolte's character and served as the film's narrator. Also in 1997, Dafoe took on a voice acting role in an episode of the animated sitcom The Simpsons titled "The Secret War of Lisa Simpson", voicing the commandant of a military academy that Bart and Lisa Simpson are attending. Following a villainous supporting role in the romantic mystery drama Lulu on the Bridge, Dafoe starred alongside Christopher Walken and Asia Argento in Abel Ferrara's cyberpunk drama New Rose Hotel in 1998. It follows X (Dafoe) and Fox (Walken), a pair of corporate raiders attempting to lure a Japanese scientist from one megacorporation to another. Although the film was largely dismissed by critics, critic David Stratton found there to be "compensation" in the performances.

In 1999, Dafoe gave a supporting performance in David Cronenberg's Existenz, a science fiction thriller in which he played a gas station owner named Gas. Later in the year, Dafoe starred in the action film The Boondock Saints. He played an eccentric, gay FBI agent assigned with investigating a series of murders committed by the MacManus twins (played by Sean Patrick Flanery and Norman Reedus) who are acting as vigilantes after an act of self-defense. The Boondock Saints was negatively received by film critics, largely for its extreme violence and lack of emotional depth, though some critics praised Dafoe's role in the film. The film performed poorly at the box office, but has since been branded as being a cult film.

In his first film of the 2000s, Dafoe was featured in a supporting role in American Psycho (2000) as a private investigator investigating the disappearance of a co-worker of Patrick Bateman (played by Christian Bale), an investment banker who leads a double life as a serial killer. He then acted in Steve Buscemi's crime drama Animal Factory, starring as an incarcerated veteran con-man who takes a young inmate (played by Edward Furlong) under his wing and introduces him to his gang. The film was positively received by critics and Elvis Mitchell of The New York Times wrote that "Dafoe steals the picture with his comic timing".

That same year he starred in Shadow of the Vampire, his final film of the year. He portrayed a fictionalized version of the German actor Max Schreck during the production of the 1922 horror film Nosferatu, in which Schreck starred as the vampire Count Orlok. Dafoe's co-star John Malkovich portrayed the film's director, F. W. Murnau. The film delves into fiction when, over the course of Nosferatu's production, the cast and crew come to discover that Schreck is actually a vampire himself. Much of the film's critical praise went to Dafoe; Roger Ebert wrote that Dafoe "embodies the Schreck of Nosferatu so uncannily that when real scenes from the silent classic are slipped into the frame, we don't notice a difference". The Chicago Reader critic Jonathan Rosenbaum felt the film's "only redeeming quality" was Dafoe's "enjoyably over-the-top, eye-rolling performance". Dafoe received numerous awards and nominations for his performance, including his second Academy Award for Best Supporting Actor nomination.

Dafoe took on two leading roles in 2001, both of which were as priests. In the drama Pavilion of Women, he played an American priest living in China who falls in love with a local married woman (played by the film's screenwriter Luo Yan) while giving her son a Western education. He starred opposite Haley Joel Osment in Edges of the Lord, playing a compassionate priest helping a young Jewish boy pose as a Catholic to protect him during Nazi Germany's occupation of Poland.

Dafoe played the supervillain the Green Goblin in Sam Raimi's 2002 superhero film Spider-Man, starring Tobey Maguire as the titular Marvel Comics superhero. Dafoe played the Norman Osborn incarnation of the Green Goblin, the billionaire founder and owner of the corporation Oscorp, becoming the Green Goblin after testing an unstable strength enhancer on himself, turning him insane and making him extremely powerful. The role required Dafoe to wear an uncomfortable costume and mask that made it impossible to emote using his face, confining Dafoe to convey emotion through his voice and head movements. Dafoe also had to wear a prosthetic teeth for his part as Norman, whereas the hallucinations of the character had Dafoe in his natural teeth. Dafoe's role in the film was generally well-received, including a New York Daily News reviewer who felt he put "the scare in archvillain" and Peter Bradshaw of The Guardian who deemed him "strong support". Conversely, critic A. O. Scott wrote that his performance was "uninspired and secondhand". IGN's Richard George commented that Green Goblin's armor, particularly the helmet, was "almost comically bad... Not only is it not frightening, it prohibits expression". Steven Scaife at Vice wrote that Dafoe's Goblin "represents everything that's fun about superhero villains, as well as everything that's great about Raimi's campy films", also commending Dafoe's voice and body language, which helped overcome the bulky Green Goblin costume that he compared to that of a Power Rangers villain.

Later in 2002, Dafoe starred with Greg Kinnear in Paul Schrader's biographical film Auto Focus, Dafoe's third collaboration with Schrader. Dafoe portrayed John Henry Carpenter, an electronics expert who develops a strange friendship with the actor Bob Crane, leading Crane into a downward spiral. Dafoe provided his voice to the animated Pixar film Finding Nemo in 2003. Dafoe voiced Gill, a moorish idol fish who helps Nemo, a clownfish, in his struggle to return home to the ocean. In the same year, Dafoe appeared in a small but pivotal role as a drug lord planning a coup d'état against the President of Mexico in Robert Rodriguez's action film Once Upon a Time in Mexico. He acted in the murder mystery film The Reckoning (2004), in which he starred with Paul Bettany. The film takes place during the Middle Ages and saw Dafoe play the leader of an acting troupe that recreate the events surrounding a woman accused of witchcraft and murder, who they believe is innocent. Dafoe lent his voice and likeness to the James Bond video game James Bond 007: Everything or Nothing (2004) as the villain Nikolai Diavolo.

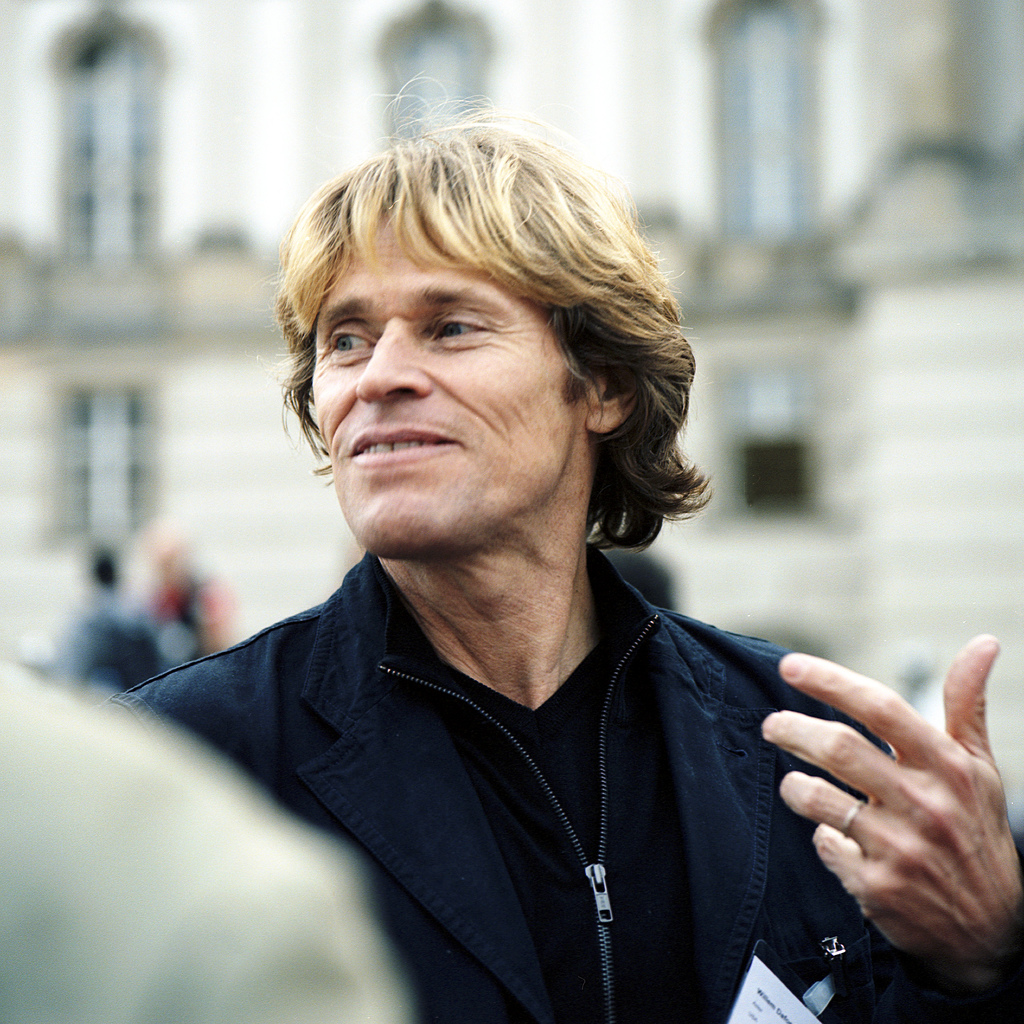
Dafoe in 2006

The following year, Dafoe took on another villainous role in The Clearing, albeit with a more sympathetic approach. Dafoe co-starred as a man who kidnaps his former boss (played by Robert Redford) in exchange for a ransom. The film received mixed reviews, although Peter Travers felt that he added a note of "vulnerability to the menace he has made his stock in trade". Dafoe reprised his role as Norman Osborn in Spider-Man 2 (2004), appearing to his son Harry in an hallucination. The cameo was suggested by Dafoe, comparing it to the ghost of Hamlet's father visiting his son to ask him to avenge his death. Dafoe was next seen in the comedy-drama The Life Aquatic with Steve Zissou (2004), his first of three films with director Wes Anderson. He played the "hilariously doltish" German first mate of a research vessel owned by the eponymous lead character, who is played by Bill Murray.

Dafoe had a small role as a tabloid magazine editor in Martin Scorsese's The Aviator (2004), a biographical film about Howard Hughes starring Leonardo DiCaprio. Also in 2004, Dafoe narrated the documentary Final Cut: The Making and Unmaking of Heaven's Gate, chronicling the production of Heaven's Gate and co-starred in the direct-to-video thriller Control (2004) alongside Ray Liotta and Michelle Rodriguez. Dafoe co-starred in XXX: State of the Union (2005), an action film sequel starring Ice Cube in which Dafoe played a U.S. Secretary of Defense attempting a coup d'état against the President of the United States. It was largely panned by critics, although Dafoe stated he did not regret appearing in the film.

With the avant-garde drama Manderlay in 2005, Dafoe began another actor-director collaboration, this time with Danish filmmaker Lars von Trier. Dafoe co-starred in the film as the father of Bryce Dallas Howard's character, a woman who discovers a plantation still thriving as if slavery had never been abolished. Along with his wife Giada Colagrande, Dafoe co-wrote and starred in Before It Had a Name (2005), which Colagrande directed. Dafoe played the caretaker of a house that is inherited by the lover of its deceased owner, engaging in a sexual relationship with her. The film was excoriated by a Variety reviewer as a "wannabe haunted house tale laced with silly sex scenes" and an "embarrassment". His fourth and final film appearance of 2005 was the crime thriller Ripley Under Ground, in which he played a museum curator. Dafoe had a supporting role in Spike Lee's 2006 crime thriller Inside Man, playing a veteran captain helping with a hostage negotiation during a bank heist on Wall Street. Dafoe co-starred as the White House Chief of Staff in American Dreamz, a comedy satirizing both popular entertainment and American politics. His character was described as a "diminutive version of Dick Cheney, with wire-rimmed glasses and a fringe of white hair" by The Times writer Caryn James. He starred with Juliette Binoche in a short film directed by Nobuhiro Suwa as part of the 2006 anthology film Paris, je t'aime.

In 2007, Dafoe played a pretentious film director in the British comedy film Mr. Bean's Holiday, starring Rowan Atkinson as Mr. Bean. The Hollywood Reporter thought that Dafoe appeared to think he was "in a pantomime", while a New York Times reviewer felt he was "amusing" in the role. Dafoe starred as the owner of a strip club in Abel Ferrara's Go Go Tales (2007); Manohla Dargis praised his "twitchy, sympathetic performance" in the film. In the same year, Dafoe voiced the main villain, an evil wizard, in the English dub of the Japanese animated fantasy film Tales from Earthsea, had a supporting role as a US Senator in the drama The Walker, his fourth collaboration with Paul Schrader, and took on the lead role in the psychological thriller Anamorph, in which Dafoe played a detective who notices the case he is investigating bears similarities to a previous case of his. He reprised his role again as Norman Osborn in Spider-Man 3 (2007) in a brief cameo. Dafoe starred with Ryan Reynolds, Julia Roberts, and Emily Watson in the drama Fireflies in the Garden, which premiered at Berlinale in 2008 but was not released theatrically until 2011. Dafoe played a cold, domineering English professor who has a strained relationship with his family. The film received mostly negative reviews, although the performances were generally praised. Roger Ebert thought that Dafoe was "fearsome" in the role, while Manohla Dargis felt he and Roberts were "awkwardly matched" as a married couple. Dafoe co-starred as a Nazi officer in Paul Schrader's Adam Resurrected (2008), which starred Jeff Goldblum as a concentration camp internee. In his final release of 2008, Dafoe starred in the Greek drama The Dust of Time as an American film director of Greek descent making a film about his mother's (played by Irène Jacob) life. The critic Peter Brunette felt the cast's performances, especially Dafoe's, were unconvincing.

Dafoe appeared in seven films in 2009, the first of which was in Lars von Trier's experimental film Antichrist. Dafoe and Charlotte Gainsbourg played a couple whose relationship becomes increasingly sexually violent and sadomasochistic after retreating to a cabin in the woods following the death of their child. The film received a polarized response from critics and audiences, receiving both applause and boos at the Cannes Film Festival and was called the "most shocking movie" to be shown at the festival because of its graphic sex scenes. Roger Ebert commended Dafoe's and Gainsbourg's performances as being "heroic and fearless". During an interview with L Magazine, it was revealed Dafoe had a stand in for scenes where his character's penis was on screen as his own was too big. Dafoe next had a small role in the French thriller Farewell as the Director of the Central Intelligence Agency. He then co-starred opposite Michael Shannon in Werner Herzog's My Son, My Son, What Have Ye Done?, in which he played a detective attempting to figure out why a troubled man killed his own mother. Dafoe played a former vampire who has a cure that can save the human species in the science fiction horror film Daybreakers. Richard Corliss of Time magazine wrote that Dafoe "triumphs over some awful dialogue by giving the role his nutsy-greatsy weirdness". Dafoe had a voice role in Wes Anderson's stop-motion animated film Fantastic Mr. Fox starring George Clooney as the titular Roald Dahl character. Fresh Air critic David Edelstein felt Dafoe was one of the film's highlights as a "hep-cat, knife-wielding rat security guard". Dafoe reprised his role from The Boondock Saints in The Boondock Saints II: All Saints Day, making a brief cameo appearance. His final appearance of the year was in Cirque du Freak: The Vampire's Assistant, another film centring around vampires in which Dafoe played the foppish vampire Gavner Purl. Between October and December 2009, Dafoe appeared in Richard Foreman's surrealist play Idiot Savant at The Public Theater.

Dafoe appeared in two films that premiered at the Venice International Film Festival in 2010, making a brief appearance in Julian Schnabel's political thriller Miral, which some reviewers found to be distracting. and starred in his wife Giada Colagrande's film A Woman. Also in 2010, Dafoe began voicing Clarence, the Birds Eye polar bear mascot in the company's television commercials in the United Kingdom, and narrated Into the Deep: America, Whaling & the World, a Ric Burns documentary about the history of the whaling industry in the United States.

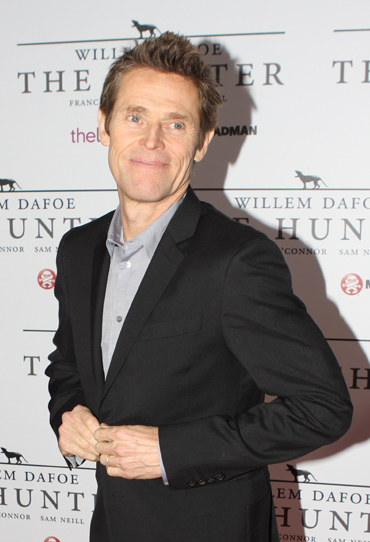
Dafoe at the premiere of The Hunter in 2011

Dafoe's first of two leading roles in 2011 was in Abel Ferrara's apocalyptic drama 4:44 Last Day on Earth, his third film with Ferrara. He played an actor spending his last hours on Earth before the end of the world with his much-younger lover (played by Shanyn Leigh). The film garnered a poor reaction critics, with a reviewer for Paste stating "there's only so much depth [Dafoe] can bring to such a shallow character". Dafoe starred in the Australian drama The Hunter, playing a professional hunter who travels to Tasmania to hunt down the world's only remaining thylacine. Critic Stephen Holden wrote in his review of the film, "Even in the "toughest, most macho roles... [Dafoe] retains a tinge of Christ-like sweetness and vulnerability". In 2011, Dafoe began narrating a series of television commercials for the company Fage and starred in a Jim Beam commercial titled "Bold Choices". Dafoe starred alongside Marina Abramović and Gretchen Mol in the play The Life and Death of Marina Abramović, where he played six different roles including Abramović's father Vojin, Abramović's brother Velimir and Abramović's partner Ulay, and which premiered at The Lowry in 2011.

Dafoe played Martian chieftain Tars Tarkas in the Disney film John Carter (2012), using motion capture to portray the multi-limbed character. The film was a box office failure and ranks among the biggest box-office bombs of all time. Later in 2012, Dafoe co-starred in the low-budget crime thriller Tomorrow You're Gone with Stephen Dorff and Michelle Monaghan. In 2013, Dafoe played a police officer in the supernatural thriller Odd Thomas, starring Anton Yelchin as the titular character that possesses supernatural powers to see the dead. Using motion-capture acting technology, Dafoe co-starred alongside Elliot Page in David Cage's video game Beyond: Two Souls (2013) as a paranormal activity researcher who acts as the surrogate-father-figure to a girl who possesses supernatural powers. The game polarized reviewers, although Dafoe and Page's performance were widely praised. In Scott Cooper's Out of the Furnace (2013), starring Christian Bale, Dafoe played the supporting role of a bookmaker running an illegal gambling operation. Dafoe next appeared in Lars von Trier's two-part erotic art film Nymphomaniac, his third and final film release of 2013. In the film, Dafoe played a perverse businessman who hires Charlotte Gainsbourg's character to work as a debt collector using sex and sadomasochism. Also in 2013, Dafoe played the devil in a Mercedes-Benz Super Bowl commercial and starred in three short student films as part of a competition sponsored by Jameson Irish Whiskey.

=== 2014–present: Independent films and career resurgence ===
In 2014, Dafoe portrayed a wealthy private banker with connections to the Russia mafia opposite Philip Seymour Hoffman in Anton Corbijn's espionage thriller A Most Wanted Man. Dafoe worked with Wes Anderson for a third time with the comedy The Grand Budapest Hotel (also 2014), featuring as the henchman of Adrien Brody's character alongside an ensemble cast led by Ralph Fiennes. Dafoe next starred alongside Matt Dillon as a detective in the crime thriller Bad Country, which critic Justin Chang dismissed as being "blandly constructed".

In May 2014, Dafoe served as member of the main competition jury at the 2014 Cannes Film Festival. He was next featured in a supporting role as a mean-spirited, alcoholic author who is visited by a pair of cancer patients, who are played by Shailene Woodley and Ansel Elgort, in the romantic drama The Fault in Our Stars. Dafoe once again collaborated with Ferrara on the drama Pasolini, in which he played Italian filmmaker Pier Paolo Pasolini during his last days before his murder in 1975. Film critic Peter Bradshaw noted the physical similarities between Dafoe and Pasolini, although felt Dafoe had too little screen time in the film. His final film of 2014 was the action thriller John Wick starring Keanu Reeves, in which Dafoe appeared as the mentor to the titular character, a former hitman who is forced out of retirement to seek vengeance for the killing of his puppy. Dafoe stated he found the use of gun fu combat created an interesting mix of action, stating "you have the grace of martial arts, but then the bang of the gun". His performance in the film was generally well received by critics, including Peter Travers who felt he provided "ample compensation". Dafoe made his second guest appearance on The Simpsons in November 2014, voicing a new school teacher who bullies Bart Simpson profusely. Dafoe starred in director's Héctor Babenco's final film My Hindu Friend (2015) as a film director close to death who befriends a Hindu 8-year-old boy while hospitalized.

The black comedy Dog Eat Dog (2016), Dafoe's sixth film with Paul Schrader, starred Dafoe and Nicolas Cage as a pair of ex-convicts hired to kidnap a baby. In the same year, Dafoe reprised his voice role as Gill, a Moorish idol fish, from Finding Nemo in its sequel Finding Dory. He next played the boss of Gerard Butler's character in the drama A Family Man and starred in Loris Gréaud's arthouse science fiction film Sculpt, which was only screened at the Los Angeles County Museum of Art for one person at a time. His final film of the year was the monster film The Great Wall, a Chinese-American co-production directed by Zhang Yimou starring Matt Damon as an Irish mercenary in China defending the Great Wall of China from a horde of monsters, in which Dafoe played a former adventurer working as a teacher in China. Also in 2016, Dafoe appeared in another Super Bowl commercial, this time for Snickers, recreating Marilyn Monroe's iconic white dress scene from the film The Seven Year Itch.

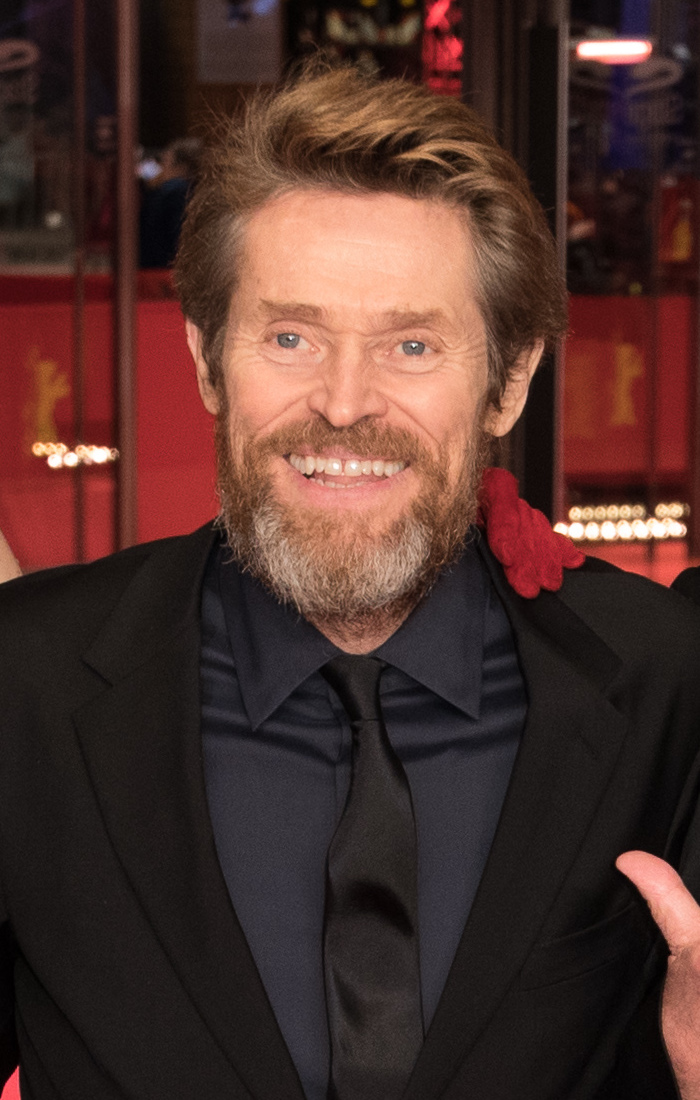
Dafoe at the 2018 Berlin International Film Festival

In the end of the decade, Dafoe experienced career resurgence after receiving two Academy Awards nominations. In 2017, Dafoe co-starred in Sean Baker's drama The Florida Project as the manager of a motel who houses a toxic mother and her six-year-old daughter. The film and his performance received critical acclaim, with The Washington Post critic Ann Hornaday writing that "Dafoe delivers his finest performance in recent memory, bringing to levelheaded, unsanctimonious life a character who offers a glimmer of hope and caring within a world markedly short on both". Dafoe earned his third Academy Award for Best Supporting Actor nomination, as well as nominations at the Golden Globes, SAG Awards, and BAFTA Awards. In 2017, Dafoe also played and voiced the character of Ryuk, a demonic death god from Japanese mythology, in Netflix's Death Note, and adaptation of the Japanese supernatural-thriller manga of the same name. He narrated Australian documentarian Jennifer Peedom's documentary Mountain. Also that year, he co-starred as Gerhard Hardman in a film adaptation of Agatha Christie's detective novel Murder on the Orient Express, directed by and starring Kenneth Branagh; and played Atlantean scientist Nuidis Vulko in a deleted role in Zack Snyder's Justice League. He later played Nuidis Vulko in a leading role in James Wan's 2018 film Aquaman. The same year, Dafoe played Vincent van Gogh in the biographical drama At Eternity's Gate, for which he received the Volpi Cup for Best Actor and his first Academy Award for Best Actor nomination. His performance drew raves from film critics. Peter Keough of Boston Globe said Dafoe "may be the best actor around for expressing an inner life in extremis."

In 2019, he had a supporting role in Edward Norton's period crime drama Motherless Brooklyn where he played powerful developer Moses Randolph's "beaten and broken" brother. In the same year, he played a lighthouse keeper on a storm-swept island in Robert Eggers' psychological horror The Lighthouse opposite Robert Pattinson. It had its world premiere at the Cannes Film Festival, where the film and Dafoe's performance received high praise. Owen Gleiberman of Variety said "Both actors are sensational (and they work together like one), but in terms of sheer showboating power it's Dafoe's movie." Dafoe won Satellite Award for Best Actor in a Supporting Role and Independent Spirit Award for Best Supporting Male for the role, and got Oscar buzz, but ultimately did not receive Academy Award nomination, in what was perceived by some as snub.

Dafoe portrayed sled dog breeder, trainer, and musher Leonhard Seppala in Togo. Dafoe reunited with Wes Anderson in the latter's ensemble period comedy The French Dispatch, appeared in Guillermo del Toro's neo-noir thriller Nightmare Alley, which were both released in 2021, and Robert Eggers's historical epic The Northman, released in 2022. All projects pushed their release dates due to the COVID-19 pandemic. Dafoe voiced the Australian ABC-television documentary River in 2021, which was written to highlight the precaricity of rivers worldwide. In 2020, The New York Times ranked him No. 18 in its list of the 25 Greatest Actors of the 21st Century.

Dafoe reprised his role as Green Goblin from Sam Raimi's Spider-Man trilogy in the Marvel Cinematic Universe film Spider-Man: No Way Home (2021). To avoid having his role in the film prematurely revealed, Dafoe wore a cloak on-set to conceal his appearance from being outed publicly. The star of the film, Tom Holland, said that he got scared after bumping into Dafoe by accident one day on set and only then found out about his role in the film. Like Alfred Molina (who reprised his role as Otto Octavius/Doctor Octopus in the film), Dafoe was digitally de-aged for the character's 2002 self. Upon release of No Way Home, Dafoe's reprisal was met with universal acclaim. The Lantern's Brett Price wrote that Dafoe was "on another level" in No Way Home and not having his mask made him even more intimidating than he was in the 2002 film. Peter Travers of Good Morning America Amelia Emberwing of IGN praised Dafoe, Molina, and Foxx in No Way Home, while Vulture's Bilge Ebiri said Dafoe "once again gets to have some modest fun with his character's divided self".

On January 18, 2022, it was announced that Dafoe would host Saturday Night Live on January 29, 2022, with musical guest singer Katy Perry. The psychological thriller film Inside had its world premiere at the 2023 Berlin International Film Festival, and was released in the United States in March by Focus Features. That same year he reunited with Wes Anderson, playing Saltzburg Keitel in Asteroid City (2023). He starred opposite Emma Stone and Mark Ruffalo in Yorgos Lanthimos's Poor Things (2023) which premiered at the Venice International Film Festival. He played Dr. Godwin "God" Baxter, a disfigured scientist who resurrects a Victorian woman. For his performance, he earned Golden Globe and SAG nominations. He portrayed Walter Reade, based on Hunter S. Thompson, acting opposite Camila Morrone in Patricia Arquette's directorial film debut Gonzo Girl based on the Cheryl Della Pietra novel of the same name. The film debuted at the 2023 Toronto International Film Festival. Also in 2023 he starred in the Italian period drama Finally Dawn with Lily James. In October 2023 it was announced that Dafoe would provide the English language voice for Elder Pelican for Hayao Miyazaki's animated film The Boy and the Heron.

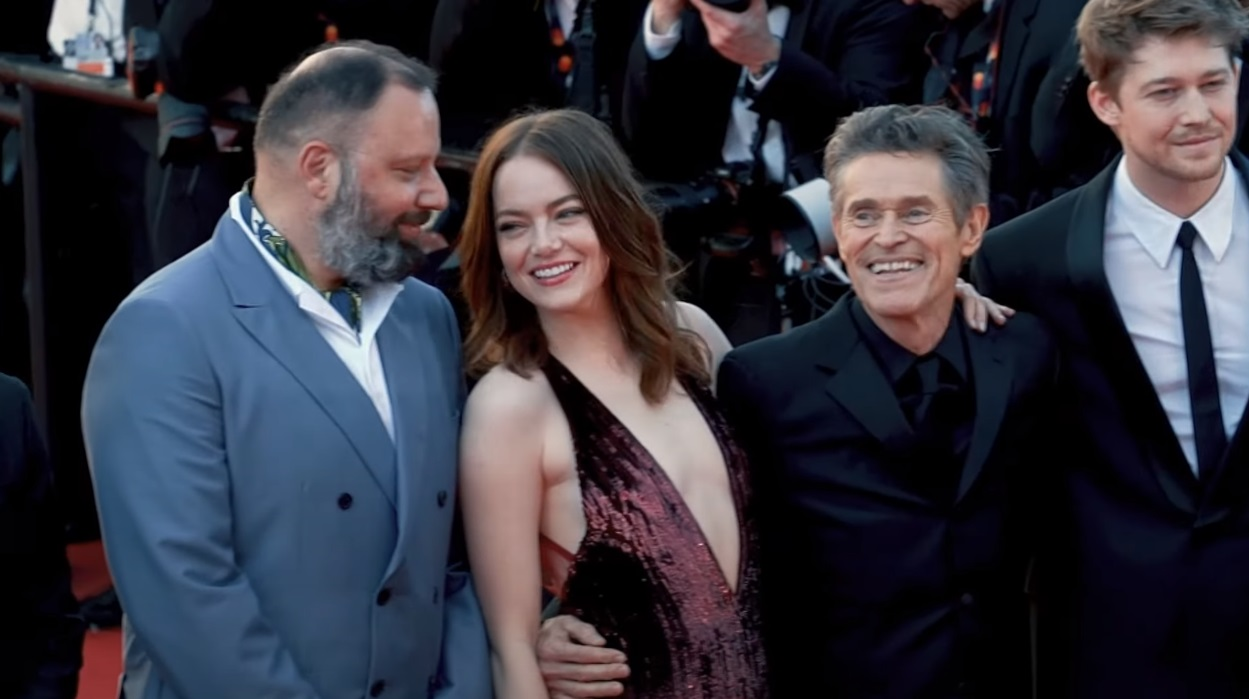
Yorgos Lanthimos, Emma Stone, Willem Dafoe, and Joe Alwyn at the Cannes Film Festival promoting Kinds of Kindness (2024)

The following year he reunited with Yorgos Lanthimos in Kinds of Kindness (2024) starring Emma Stone, Jesse Plemons, and Margaret Qualley. Dafoe also acted in the British romantic thriller Pet Shop Days. In Tim Burton's sequel Beetlejuice Beetlejuice, he appeared as Wolf Jackson, a ghost detective. The film was released on September 6, 2024, to critical and commercial success. He starred as real-life television talent executive David Tebet in Jason Reitman's biographical comedy-drama film Saturday Night, released on October 11, 2024. He portrayed Professor Albin Eberhart Von Franz in Robert Eggers' gothic horror film Nosferatu, which was released on December 25, 2024. He played Maxim, the overly-protective father, in the A24 fantasy adventure film The Legend of Ochi with Helena Zengel, Emily Watson, and Finn Wolfhard, which was released in April 2025. He reteamed with Wes Anderson in his feature The Phoenician Scheme. In August 2025, Dafoe was honored with the Honorary Heart of Sarajevo Award at the 31st Sarajevo Film Festival. Also in 2025, he starred in Miguel Ángel Jiménez's The Birthday Party, Kent Jones's Late Fame, Gastón Solnicki's The Souffleur, and the film adaptation of Walter Mosley's novel The Man in My Basement. In 2026, Dafoe co-starred in Jennifer Peedom's biographical drama Tenzing.

==== Upcoming projects ====
Dafoe will next star in Robert Eggers' period horror Werwulf.

== Acting credits and accolades ==
Dafoe has received numerous accolades including nominations for four Academy Awards, a BAFTA Award, four Critics' Choice Movie Awards, three Golden Globe Awards, four Critics' Choice Movie Awards and five Actor Awards. He received four Independent Spirit Award nominations winning twice for Best Supporting Male for his roles in Shadow of the Vampire (2000), and The Florida Project (2017).

Over his career he has been recognized by the Academy of Motion Picture Arts and Sciences for the following performances:

- 59th Academy Awards: Best Supporting Actor, nomination, Platoon (1986)
- 73rd Academy Awards: Best Supporting Actor, nomination, Shadow of the Vampire (2000)
- 90th Academy Awards: Best Supporting Actor, nomination, The Florida Project (2017)
- 91st Academy Awards: Best Actor, nomination, At Eternity's Gate (2018)

On January 8, 2024, he received a star on the Hollywood Walk of Fame.

== Personal life ==
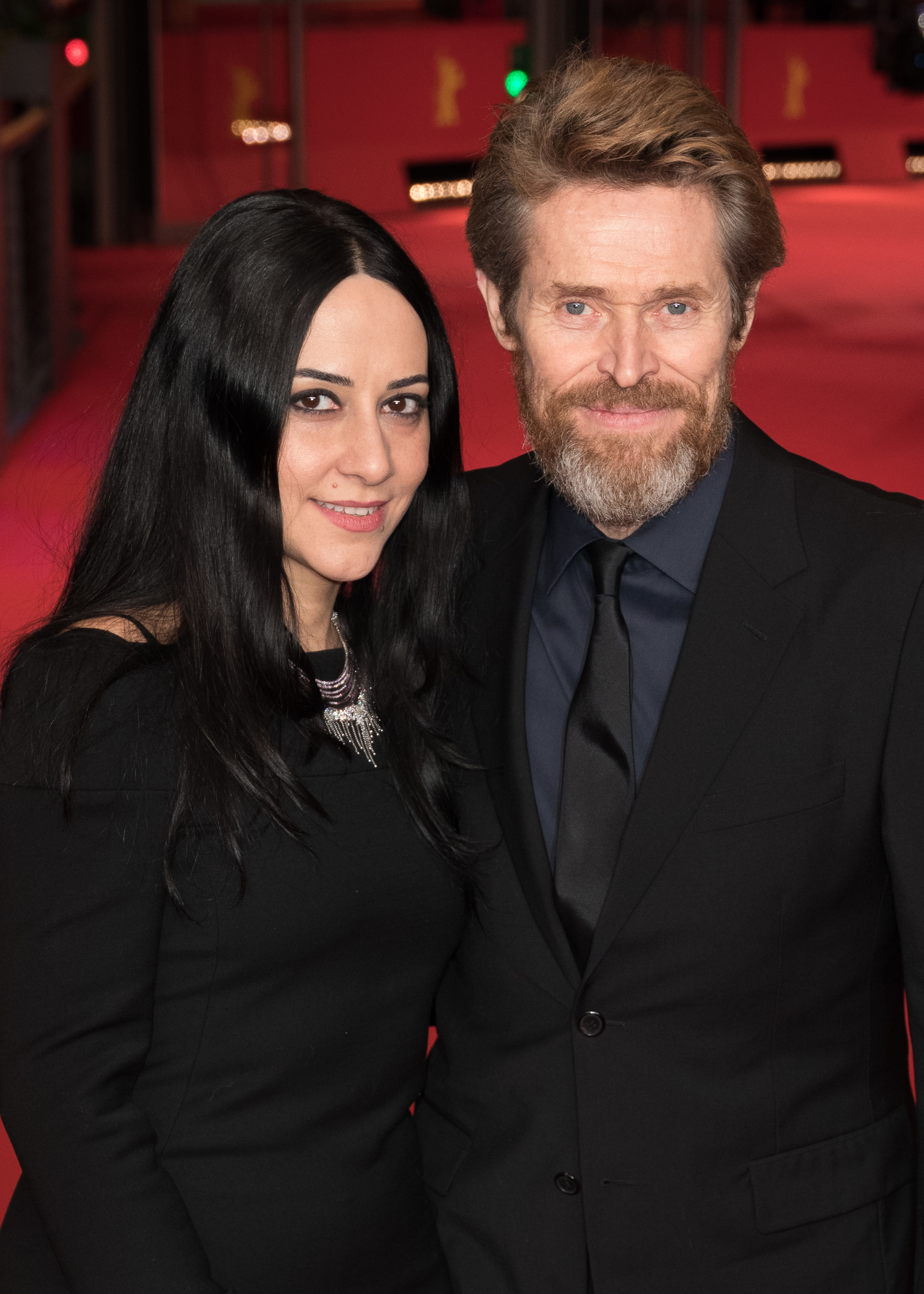
Dafoe and his wife, Giada Colagrande, in 2018

In 1977, Dafoe began a relationship with director Elizabeth LeCompte. Their son, Jack, was born in 1982. They separated in 2004 and were never married, with Dafoe later explaining that he and LeCompte "never married because to her marriage represented ownership, and I respected that".

In 1988, his mother, Muriel, told the Orlando Sentinel, "He was brought up in a Christian home, and he believes in God. And I do not believe he would do anything blasphemous."

Dafoe met Italian actress Giada Colagrande while filming Wes Anderson's film The Life Aquatic with Steve Zissou in 2003. They were married on March 25, 2005. Dafoe recalled in 2010, "We were having lunch and I said, 'Do you want to get married tomorrow?'" They did so the following afternoon at a small ceremony with two friends as witnesses. Since then they have worked together on her films Before It Had a Name and A Woman. They split their time between Rome, where they have a farm, and West Village, Manhattan, New York City. They previously had a house in Ulster County, New York. Dafoe acquired Italian citizenship through the marriage.

Dafoe is a pescetarian, and believes that "animal farms are one of the main causes of the destruction of the planet". He signed a letter calling to act strongly against the threats of climate change and biodiversity loss. He practices ashtanga yoga every day.

On May 22, 2022, Dafoe was invited back to his alma mater the University of Wisconsin–Milwaukee by chancellor Mark Mone to serve as the keynote speaker for the university's commencement ceremony and to receive an honorary Doctor of Arts degree.
