= Defoe (surname) =

Defoe is a surname. Its origin is uncertain, it may be a variation of Foe or Fow or an Anglicized form of a French name, possibly Thevoz, Thevoux, de Vaux or Devaux, Dufau or Dufou. Notable people with the surname include:

- Annette DeFoe (1890–1960), American silent film actress
- Daniel Defoe (c. 1660–1731), English trader, writer, and journalist best known for writing Robinson Crusoe
- David Defoe (born 1949), Dominican-Dutch cricketer
- Gideon Defoe (born 1975), author of Pirates!
- Jermain Defoe (born 1982), English footballer
- Dr Peter Stanley Defoe (born 1952), Chartered Building Surveyor and author on Rights of Light The Validity of Daylight Calculations in Rights to Light Cases

== See also ==
- Dafoe
- DeFeo
- Defew
- Deffew
- de Feue
