= List of awards and nominations received by Willem Dafoe =

Willem Dafoe awards and nominations
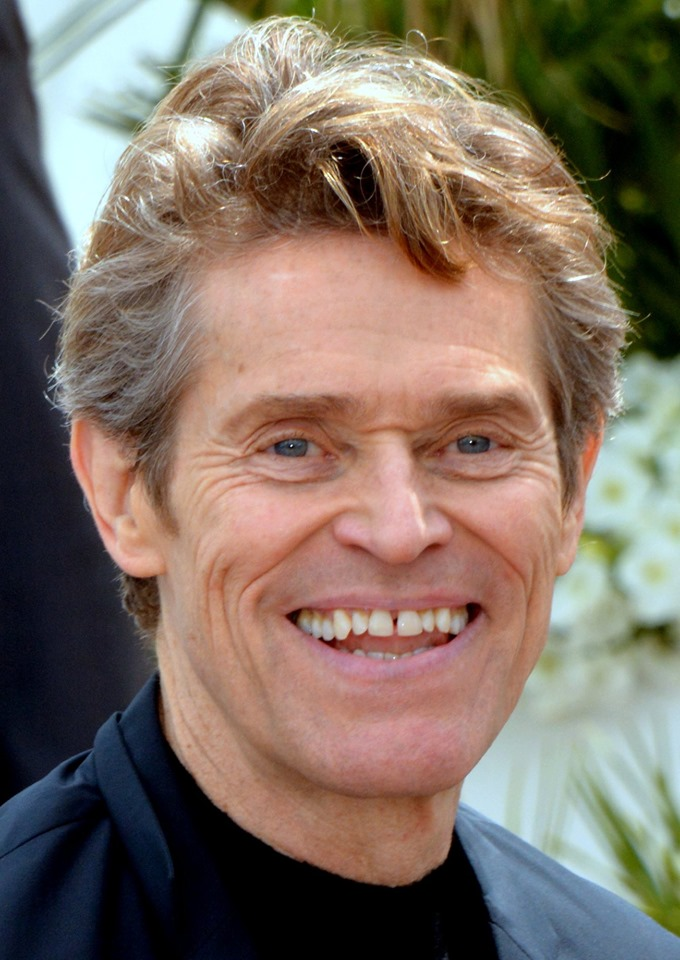
- Dafoe at the 2019 Cannes Film Festival
Awards and nominations
Award	Wins	Nominations
Academy Awards	0	4
BAFTA Awards	0	1
Critics' Choice Awards	1	6
Golden Globes	0	4
SAG Awards	0	5

Totals (Note: Certain award groups do not simply award one winner. They acknowledge several different recipients, have runners-up, and have third place. Since this is a specific recognition and is different from losing an award, runner-up mentions are considered wins in this award tally. For simplification and to avoid errors, each award in this list has been presumed to have had a prior nomination.)
- Wins: 69
- Nominations: 124

The following is a list of awards and nominations received by Willem Dafoe.

Willem Dafoe is an American actor known for his extensive diverse roles in film. He has received numerous accolades including two Independent Spirit Awards as well as nominations for four Academy Awards, a BAFTA Award, four Golden Globe Awards, and five Screen Actors Guild Awards. Dafoe was honored with the Honorary Golden Bear in 2018 and a Motion Picture Star on the Hollywood Walk of Fame in 2024.

Dafoe gained acclaim for playing a compassionate Sergeant during the Vietnam War in Oliver Stone's war drama Platoon (1986) for which he was nominated for the Academy Award for Best Supporting Actor and the Independent Spirit Award for Best Male Lead. He played a career criminal in the David Lynch romantic crime drama Wild at Heart (1991) for which he was nominated for the Independent Spirit Award for Best Supporting Male. He portrayed Max Schreck in the E. Elias Merhige directed horror film Shadow of the Vampire (2000) for which he won the Independent Spirit Award for Best Supporting Male and was nominated for the Academy Award for Best Supporting Actor, the Golden Globe Award for Best Supporting Actor – Motion Picture, and the Screen Actors Guild Award for Outstanding Performance by a Male Actor in a Supporting Role.

For his role as a kindly motel manager in the Sean Baker coming-of-age drama The Florida Project (2017) he was nominated for the Academy Award, the BAFTA Award, the Critics' Choice Award, the Golden Globe Award and the Screen Actors Guild Award for Outstanding Actor in a Supporting Role. He took a leading role as painter Vincent van Gogh in the Julian Schnabel biographical drama At Eternity's Gate (2018) for which he won the Volpi Cup for Best Actor and was nominated for the Academy Award for Best Actor and the Golden Globe Award for Best Actor in a Motion Picture – Drama. He played a moody lighthouse keeper in the Robert Eggers psychological drama The Lighthouse (2019) for which he won the Independent Spirit Award for Best Supporting Male and was nominated for the Critics' Choice Movie Award for Best Supporting Actor.

In 2002, he gained international recognition for his portrayal as Norman Osborn / Green Goblin in Sam Raimi's Spider-Man (2002), Spider-Man 2 (2004) and Spider-Man 3 (2007), for which he was nominated for the MTV Movie Award for Best Villain. He reprised the role in the Marvel Cinematic Universe (MCU) film Spider-Man: No Way Home (2021) for which he won the Critics' Choice Super Award for Best Villain in a Movie. He also became known for his appearances in numerous of Wes Anderson's films including The Life Aquatic with Steve Zissou (2004), Fantastic Mr. Fox (2009), The Grand Budapest Hotel (2014), The French Dispatch (2021), and The Phoenician Scheme (2025).

== Major associations ==
=== Academy Awards ===
Year	Category	Nominated work	Result	Ref.
1987	Best Supporting Actor	Platoon	Nominated	
2001	Best Supporting Actor	Shadow of the Vampire	Nominated	
2018	Best Supporting Actor	The Florida Project	Nominated	
2019	Best Actor	At Eternity's Gate	Nominated	

=== BAFTA Awards ===
Year	Category	Nominated work	Result	Ref.
2018	Best Film Actor in a Supporting Role	The Florida Project	Nominated	

=== Critics' Choice Awards ===
Year	Category	Nominated work	Result	Ref.
Critics' Choice Movie Awards
2004	Best Acting Ensemble	The Life Aquatic with Steve Zissou	Nominated	
2017	Best Supporting Actor	The Florida Project	Nominated	
2018	Best Actor	At Eternity's Gate	Nominated	
2019	Best Supporting Actor	The Lighthouse	Nominated	
Critics' Choice Super Awards
2022	Best Villain in a Movie	Spider-Man: No Way Home	Won	
2024	Best Actor in a Science Fiction/Fantasy Movie	Poor Things	Nominated	

=== Golden Globe Awards ===
Year	Category	Nominated work	Result	Ref.
2001	Best Supporting Actor – Motion Picture	Shadow of the Vampire	Nominated	
2018	Best Supporting Actor – Motion Picture	The Florida Project	Nominated	
2019	Best Actor in a Motion Picture – Drama	At Eternity's Gate	Nominated	
2024	Best Supporting Actor – Motion Picture	Poor Things	Nominated	

=== Screen Actors Guild Awards ===
Year	Category	Nominated work	Result	Ref.
1997	Outstanding Ensemble Cast in a Motion Picture	The English Patient	Nominated	
2001	Outstanding Supporting Actor in a Motion Picture	Shadow of the Vampire	Nominated	
2015	Outstanding Ensemble Cast in a Motion Picture	The Grand Budapest Hotel	Nominated	
2018	Outstanding Supporting Actor in a Motion Picture	The Florida Project	Nominated	
2024	Outstanding Supporting Actor in a Motion Picture	Poor Things	Nominated	

== Miscellaneous awards ==
Organizations	Year	Category	Work	Result	Ref.
AACTA Awards	2012	Best Actor in a Leading Role	The Hunter	Nominated	
Bodil Awards	2010	Best Actor in a Leading Role	Antichrist	Won	
Fantasporto International Film Festival	2000	Best Actor	Shadow of the Vampire	Won	
Gotham Awards	2018	Best Actor	The Florida Project	Nominated	
Gotham Awards	2019	Best Actor	The Lighthouse	Nominated	
Golden Raspberry Awards	1994	Worst Actor	Body of Evidence	Nominated	
Golden Raspberry Awards	1998	Worst Supporting Actor	Speed 2: Cruise Control	Nominated	
Golden Schmoes Awards	2021	Favorite Movie of the Year	Spider-Man: No Way Home	Won	
Independent Spirit Awards	1987	Best Male Lead	Platoon	Nominated	
Independent Spirit Awards	1991	Best Supporting Male	Wild at Heart	Nominated	
Independent Spirit Awards	2001	Best Supporting Male	Shadow of the Vampire	Won	
Independent Spirit Awards	2020	Best Supporting Male	The Lighthouse	Won	
MTV Movie & TV Awards	2003	Best Fight	Spider-Man	Nominated	
MTV Movie & TV Awards	2003	Best Villain	Spider-Man	Nominated	
MTV Movie & TV Awards	2022	Best Villain	Spider-Man: No Way Home	Nominated	
Robert Awards	2009	Best Actor in a Leading Role	Antichrist	Nominated	
Sant Jordi Awards	1992	Best Foreign Actor	Light Sleeper	Won	
Satellite Awards	2000	Best Supporting Actor in a Motion Picture	Shadow of the Vampire	Won	
Satellite Awards	2017	Best Supporting Actor in a Motion Picture	The Florida Project	Nominated	
Satellite Awards	2018	Best Actor in a Motion Picture, Drama	At Eternity's Gate	Won	
Satellite Awards	2019	Best Supporting Actor in a Motion Picture	The Lighthouse	Won	
Spike Video Game Awards	2013	Best Voice Actor	Beyond: Two Souls	Nominated	
UK Film Festival	2018	Best Actor	Padre	Won	
Venice Film Festival	2018	Fondazione Mimmo Rotella Award	At Eternity's Gate	Won	
Venice Film Festival	2018	Green Drop Award	At Eternity's Gate	Won	
Venice Film Festival	2018	Volpi Cup for Best Actor	At Eternity's Gate	Won	

== Critics awards ==
Organizations	Year	Category	Work	Result	Ref.
Alliance of Women Film Journalists	2018	Best Actor	At Eternity's Gate	Nominated	
Alliance of Women Film Journalists	2020	Best Supporting Actor	The Lighthouse	Nominated	
Austin Film Critics Association	2018	Best Supporting Actor	The Florida Project	Won	
Austin Film Critics Association	2020	Best Supporting Actor	The Lighthouse	Nominated	
Boston Society of Film Critics	2004	Best Cast	The Life Aquatic with Steve Zissou	Nominated	
Boston Society of Film Critics	2017	Best Supporting Actor	The Florida Project	Won	
Chicago Film Critics Association	2001	Best Supporting Actor	Shadow of the Vampire	Nominated	
Chicago Film Critics Association	2003	Best Supporting Actor	Auto Focus	Nominated	
Chicago Film Critics Association	2017	Best Supporting Actor	The Florida Project	Won	
Columbus Film Critics Association	2019	Best Supporting Actor	The Lighthouse	Won	
Dallas–Fort Worth Film Critics Association	2001	Best Supporting Actor	Shadow of the Vampire	Nominated	
Dallas–Fort Worth Film Critics Association	2017	Best Supporting Actor	The Florida Project	Nominated	
Dallas–Fort Worth Film Critics Association	2019	Best Supporting Actor	The Lighthouse	Nominated	
Detroit Film Critics Society	2017	Best Supporting Actor	The Florida Project	Won	
Detroit Film Critics Society	2019	Best Supporting Actor	The Lighthouse	Nominated	
Florida Film Critics Circle	2018	Best Actor	At Eternity's Gate	Nominated	
Georgia Film Critics Association Awards	2015	Best Ensemble	The Grand Budapest Hotel	Won	
Georgia Film Critics Association Awards	2018	Best Supporting Actor	The Florida Project	Won	
Georgia Film Critics Association Awards	2020	Best Supporting Actor	The Lighthouse	Nominated	
Los Angeles Film Critics Association	2000	Best Supporting Actor	Shadow of the Vampire	Won	
Los Angeles Film Critics Association	2017	Best Supporting Actor	The Florida Project	Won	
London Film Critics' Circle	2017	Supporting Actor of the Year	The Florida Project	Nominated	
National Academy of Video Game Trade Reviewers	2013	Supporting Performance in a Drama	Beyond: Two Souls	Nominated	
National Board of Review	2017	Best Supporting Actor	The Florida Project	Won	
National Society of Film Critics	2017	Best Supporting Actor	The Florida Project	Won	
National Society of Film Critics	2018	Best Actor	At Eternity's Gate	2nd Place	
New York Film Critics Circle	2000	Best Supporting Actor	Shadow of the Vampire	Nominated	
New York Film Critics Circle	2002	Best Supporting Actor	Auto Focus	Nominated	
New York Film Critics Circle	2017	Best Supporting Actor	The Florida Project	Won	
New York Film Critics Online	2017	Best Supporting Actor	The Florida Project	Won	
Online Film Critics Society	2000	Best Supporting Actor	Shadow of the Vampire	Nominated	
Online Film Critics Society	2019	Best Supporting Actor	The Lighthouse	Nominated	
San Diego Film Critics Society	2000	Best Supporting Actor	Shadow of the Vampire	Nominated	
San Diego Film Critics Society	2017	Best Supporting Actor	The Florida Project	Runner-up	
San Diego Film Critics Society	2019	Best Supporting Actor	The Lighthouse	Nominated	
San Francisco Film Critics Circle	2017	Best Supporting Actor	The Florida Project	Won	
San Francisco Film Critics Circle	2018	Best Actor	At Eternity's Gate	Nominated	
San Francisco Film Critics Circle	2019	Best Supporting Actor	The Lighthouse	Nominated	
Seattle Film Critics Society	2017	Best Supporting Actor	The Florida Project	Won	
Seattle Film Critics Society	2019	Best Supporting Actor	The Lighthouse	Won	
Seattle Film Critics Society	2022	Villain of the Year	Spider-Man: No Way Home	Nominated	
St. Louis Film Critics Association	2017	Best Supporting Actor	The Florida Project	Nominated	
St. Louis Film Critics Association	2018	Best Actor	At Eternity's Gate	Nominated	
Toronto Film Critics Association	2017	Best Supporting Actor	The Florida Project	Won	
Toronto Film Critics Association	2018	Best Actor	At Eternity's Gate	Nominated	
Toronto Film Critics Association	2019	Best Supporting Actor	The Lighthouse	Runner-up	
Utah Film Critics Association	2017	Best Supporting Actor	The Florida Project	Won	
Vancouver Film Critics Circle	2017	Best Supporting Actor	The Florida Project	Won	
Washington D.C. Area Film Critics Association	2017	Best Supporting Actor	The Florida Project	Nominated	

== Honorary awards ==
Organizations	Year	Award	Result	Ref.
Taormina International Film Festival	2002	Taormina Arte Award	Honored	
San Sebastián International Film Festival	2005	Donostia Lifetime Achievement Award	Honored	
Locarno Film Festival	2006	Excellence Award	Honored	
Stockholm Film Festival	2012	Achievement Award	Honored	
Karlovy Vary International Film Festival	2016	Outstanding Contribution to World Cinema	Honored	
Berlin International Film Festival	2018	Honorary Golden Bear	Honored	
Gotham Awards	2018	Tribute Award	Honored	
Santa Barbara International Film Festival	2018	Cinema Vanguard Award	Honored	
University of Wisconsin-Milwaukee	2022	Honorary Doctor of Arts	Honored	
Morelia International Film Festival	2023	Artistic Excellence Award	Honored	
Hollywood Walk of Fame	2024	Motion Picture Star at 6284 Hollywood Blvd.	Honored	
Sarajevo Film Festival	2025	Honorary Heart of Sarajevo Award	Honored	
