= PHO =

PHO or pho may refer to:

- Phở, a Vietnamese noodle soup
- Pho (restaurant), UK chain
- Primary health organisation, New Zealand
- Public health observatory, UK
- Potentially hazardous object, an asteroid or comet that could potentially collide with Earth
- Pho regulon, a bacterial phosphate regulatory mechanism

== See also ==
- Pho4, a basic helix-loop-helix transcription factor
- Phos, a genus of sea snails
