= A Woman (2010 film) =

- Directed by: Giada Colagrande
- Written by: Giada Colagrande
- Produced by: Rita Capasa; Frank Frattaroli
- Starring: Willem Dafoe; Jess Weixler
- Cinematography: Tommaso Borgstrom
- Edited by: Natalie Cristiani
- Music by: Angelo Badalamenti
- Production company: Bidou Pictures
- Release date: September 4, 2010
- Running time: 100 minutes
- Countries: United States; Italy
- Languages: English; Italian

A Woman is a 2010 American-Italian drama film written and directed by Giada Colagrande and starring Willem Dafoe and Jess Weixler.

== Plot ==
The young woman Julie falls in love with the famous writer Max Oliver, who has just published a bestseller about his deceased wife, the beautiful mysterious Lucia. Julie wants to ease Max's grief and accompany him to Italy to live with him. After a short time, Julie's interest in Lucia turns into a fierce obsession. Little by little, Julie loses her mind.

== Cast ==
- Willem Dafoe as Max Oliver
- Jess Weixler as Julie
- Stefania Rocca as Natalie
- Michele Venitucci as Vincenzo
- Mariela Franganillo as Lucia Giordano
