= Ubi de Feo =

Italian creative technologist and educator (born 1974)

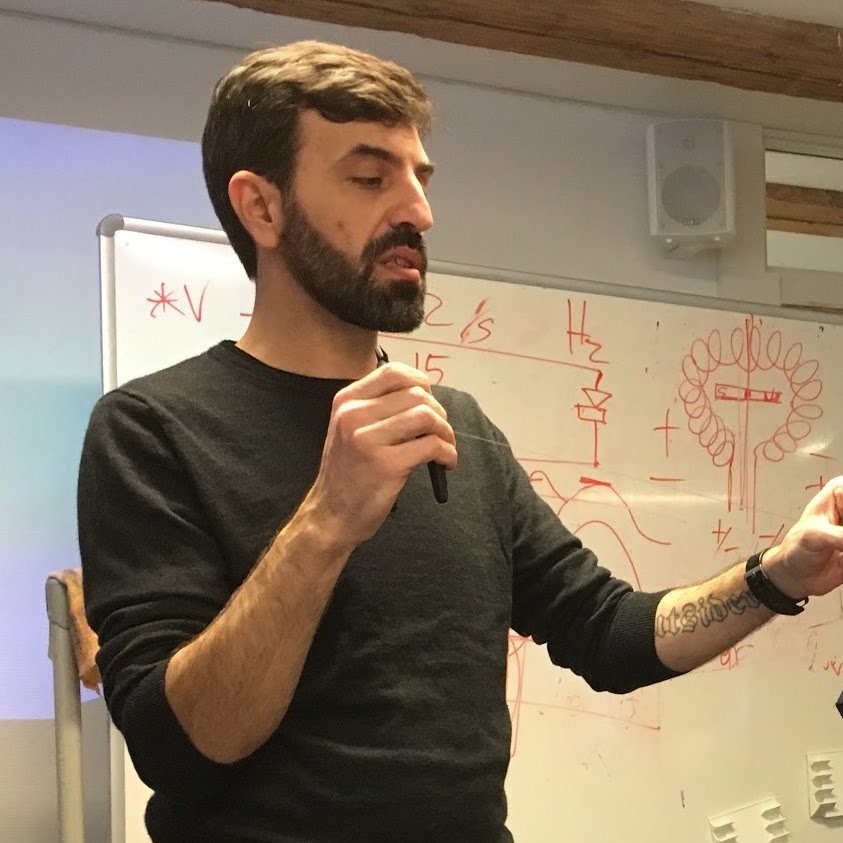
- Ubi teaching electronics in 2016 at CIID
- Born: 1974 (age 51–52); Italy
- Education: University of Salerno (dropped out in 1996)
- Occupations: Creative Technologist, Educator

Ubi de Feo (born 1974) is a creative technologist and educator. Curiosity drives everything in his life and work. In 2007 de Feo began teaching programming, electronics and other things.

== Education ==
"I have learned most of what I know by interacting with people far from my location. Internet has been my campus and will be till the end of one of us two, be it mine or the internet's," Ubi de Feo. From 1993–1995 de Feo was enrolled at the University of Salerno where he studied Electrical and Electronics Engineering. Bored with that track he dropped out and switched his focus to Social Studies. In 1995 he was drafted into the Navy. Shortly thereafter de Feo was in a serious Vespa accident and spent six months in bed recovering and thinking.

== Professional life ==
In 2000 de Feo became a professional creative coder. He began experimenting with mobile devices in 2001. In 2002 he moved to Amsterdam where he worked as a Creative Technologist for Wieden+Kenney [W+K interaction design lab startup], set up the collective Hello, Savants! [a fellowship of creative people with unique disabilities and unexpected talents], and went to work for himself as twodotone. In this range of capacities de Feo produced both personal and commercial projects that span disciplines from teaching and coding to sound and animation while developing projects for Nike, Nokia [Nokia Flagship Stores Bluetooth Framework], Gore-Tex, Heineken, Bottega Veneta, Mandarina Duck, Electronic Arts, Reebok, MTV networks, Nationaal Historisch Museum Amsterdam, Belastingdienst and many more. Currently de Feo is the Director of Secret Space Program at MediaMonks and is a 2015 visiting faculty at Copenhagen Institute of Interaction Design (CIID).

== Teaching ==
Ubi de Feo's project "From 0 to C" is a series of workshops – and a framework of objects, methods, stories and games – that aim at teaching programming using a more creative, human approach. Through the use of tangible, hand-made objects, "From 0 to C" attempts to establish a clear understanding of how a computer works and what a programming language actually is.

During years of teaching—or trying to teach—Arduino coding to creatives, de Feo ran into the following scenarios: “For the beginner, the artist, the industrial designer who wants to start prototyping, [the difficulties of learning to code] can appear as walls they constantly have to crash against," de Feo observed. "If you ask them why, most of the times the answer will be something along the lines of I’m a creative person, this structured stuff is not for me." His Arduino courses at Mediamatic with Massimo Banzi revealed "a really steep entry curve" barrier and further motivated de Feo to develop a new approach. "People got really really excited about the electronic part of it and the entry of the code was really complex. I have studied so many languages that I have learnt a lot of tricks and things that could be useful in learning a new programming language. I wanted to teach people Arduino but I wanted to teach them really really well." Realizing that the conventional approach to teaching coding was not working for the [creative] type of student, de Feo created “From 0 to C,” starting with a rather radical step: Removing all of the computers from the classroom. Instead, he introduced physical objects the students are meant to interact with. “From 0 to C” allows people to visualize what happens inside the computer when a program runs – how bytes are moved around and manipulated by the program.

Regarding the "From 0 to C" outcomes, de Feo explains, "The scope of this primer is not teaching you to be the best coder or hacker, but to be one who knows what you are dealing with and has a better attitude towards problem solving." "After learning the ins and outs of how stupid computers actually are, [Ubi]’s students then learn the syntax of a language of their choice (C, JavaScript, or Python, for example), and write a few programs."

Ubi de Feo has taught the Introduction to Electronics class at CIID (Copenhagen Institute of Interaction Design) in both 2015 and 2016 during their Interaction Design Programme.

== Selected workshops ==
- 2015 Copenhagen Institute of Interaction Design (CIID): Physical Computing with Ubi De Feo, Alice Pintus, and Lorenzo Romagnoli
- 2013 KIKK festival, Namur, Belgium: Learning "From 0 to C" on using tangible objects and real-world metaphors to teach programming

== Selected projects ==
- EYE Film Institute Netherlands Quiz Booth [2011] [with Hello, Savants! and meg grant]: button controller for a Quiz Booth; Sit in a cozy pod and answer multiple-choice questions about movies. The software design and interaction was executed by Submarine. When you select your answer, you'll enter it into the system by pushing a button
- The Automatiek [2010] [with Mediamatic]: interactive installation for the Museum of National History; An interactive installation that combines a typical Dutch snack machine, RFID technology, video and objects that evoke Dutch history.
- RadarFunk [2009] [for the Playmobiel exhibition, Amsterdam]: software for mobile phones that can scan drawings and transform them into beats; conceived by Pips:Lab (initial concept) and TwoDotOne (mobile transposition and additional concepting). The BlueTooth server involved, BlueSocket, is a technology developed by TwoDotOne, with concept and design by Ubi de Feo, and programming is by Salvatore Iodice
- The Magic Coloring Wall [2008]: interactive installation with a computer, and a large projection. The computer projects a line drawing on to the screen, and viewers are given a "magic paintbrush" to color the drawing in. When the viewer puts the magic paintbrush over a certain area, that spot fills in with color, as if you were painting with an actual paintbrush. Similar to the "magic markers" that we used as kids, this installation uses personal interaction to reveal hidden images where the "marker" draws. This works with a tracking system on a camera that tracks the marker, or brush, of the user and then a projector draws a hidden image where the brush has been
- Code troubles [with W+K]: collection of code bugs. "Basically it was Flash and Director experiments that had gone wrong. I was showing people this code, highlighting where the problem was and explaining why I kept it. I’m a control freak, unpredictability freaks me out but I always like to see and explore what happens if.

== Lectures ==
- From 0toC with Ubi de Feo (IT); Scratch Conference 2015, Amsterdam
- Unfinished Business with Ubi de Feo, FITC AMSTERDAM 2015
- Closing the Circle: 8 Bit to 64 and Back with Ubi de Feo FITC AMSTERDAM 2014
- From O To C. "Make believe" sounds better than "simulation."Copenhagen Institute Of Interaction Design ApS, Copenhagen, Denmark

== Press ==
- Solon, Olivia; Workshops teach programming with offline, playful approach (Wired UK)

== Publications ==
- Banzi, Massimo. Getting Started with Arduino. 1st ed. Cambridge; Beijing; Make Books / O'Reilly, 2009.
