= Donald Dafoe =

American transplant surgeon and research scientist (born 1949)

- Born: Donald Cameron Dafoe; November 22, 1949 (age 76)
- Citizenship: United States
- Education: University of Wisconsin-Madison
- Occupations: Transplant surgeon; research scientist
- Spouse: Rhoda F. Leichter (divorced) Sahara Dafoe (divorced)
- Children: 5
- Relatives: Willem Dafoe (brother); Giada Colagrande (sister-in-law)
- Medical career
- Institutions: Cedars-Sinai Medical Center

Donald Cameron Dafoe (born November 22, 1949) is an American transplant surgeon and research scientist active in California.

== Biography ==
Dafoe was born Donald Cameron Dafoe on November 22, 1949 to William Alfred Dafoe (1917–2014), a surgeon and physician, and Muriel Isabel Dafoe (née Sprissler; 1921–2012), a nurse. One of eight siblings, Dafoe is the elder brother of the actor Willem Dafoe. Raised in Appleton, Wisconsin, Dafoe graduated from Appleton West High School in 1967.

He then attended the University of Wisconsin-Madison, where he received his undergraduate degree in zoology and his medical degree.

He became a transplant surgeon after training in surgery at the Hospital of the University of Pennsylvania, and now works at University of California Irvine Medical Center in Orange, California, where he is chief of transplantation surgery. He previously worked at Cedars-Sinai Medical Center, where he was Director of the Pancreas Transplantation, Kidney and Pancreas Transplant Center; Director of Surgical Education; and held the Eris M. Field Endowed Chair in Diabetes Research. He was previously medical director for the California Transplant Donor Network.

He has written over 160 peer-reviewed articles, and has been on the editorial board of Journal of Surgical Research, The Chimera, and Transplantation Science.

== Personal life ==
Dafoe has five children, and was previously married to the vascular surgeon Rhoda F. Leichter and Sahara Dafoe. Dafoe is the brother-in-law of Giada Colagrande.
