= Defoe, Webster County, West Virginia =

Unincorporated community in West Virginia, United States

Defoe
- Unincorporated community
- Location within the state of West Virginia Defoe (the United States)
- Coordinates: 38°32′50″N 80°34′34″W
- Country: United States
- State: West Virginia
- County: Webster
- Elevation: 1,398 ft (426 m)
- Time zone: UTC-5 (Eastern (EST))
  - Summer (DST): UTC-4 (EDT)
- GNIS ID: 1727846

Defoe was an unincorporated community in Webster County, West Virginia.
