= At Eternity's Gate (film) =

2018 film

- Theatrical release poster
- Directed by: Julian Schnabel
- Written by: Jean-Claude Carrière; Louise Kugelberg; Julian Schnabel
- Produced by: Jon Kilik
- Starring: Willem Dafoe; Rupert Friend; Mads Mikkelsen; Mathieu Amalric; Emmanuelle Seigner; Oscar Isaac
- Cinematography: Benoît Delhomme
- Edited by: Louise Kugelberg; Julian Schnabel
- Music by: Tatiana Lisovskaya
- Production companies: Riverstone Pictures; SPK Pictures; Rocket Science; Rahway Road; Iconoclast
- Distributed by: Netflix (France); Curzon Artificial Eye (United Kingdom); CBS Films (United States)
- Release dates: September 3, 2018 (Venice); November 16, 2018 (United States); February 15, 2019 (France); March 29, 2019 (United Kingdom)
- Running time: 110 minutes
- Countries: France; United Kingdom; United States
- Languages: English; French
- Box office: $11.5 million

At Eternity's Gate is a 2018 biographical drama film directed by Julian Schnabel, from a screenplay by Schnabel, Jean-Claude Carrière and Louise Kugelberg. It follows Vincent van Gogh's final years of life, including dramatizing the theory that his death was caused by manslaughter rather than suicide. It stars Willem Dafoe as van Gogh, alongside an ensemble cast that includes Rupert Friend, Oscar Isaac, Mads Mikkelsen, Mathieu Amalric, Emmanuelle Seigner and Niels Arestrup.

The film had its world premiere in the main competition of the 75th Venice International Film Festival on September 3, 2018, where Dafoe won the Volpi Cup for Best Actor. It was theatrically released in the United States on November 16, 2018, by CBS Films, before streaming on Netflix in France on February 15, 2019. It was released theatrically in the United Kingdom on March 29, 2019, by Curzon Artificial Eye. It received generally positive reviews from critics; Dafoe's acting was widely acclaimed, and for his performance he was nominated for the Academy Award for Best Actor and the Golden Globe Award for Best Actor – Motion Picture Drama, among others.

== Plot ==
Vincent van Gogh seems to always be in artistic and emotional exhaustion. He is occasionally enraptured by his aesthetic responses to the landscapes around Arles; he renders them in oil on canvas or in a sketch pad using his own style of creating his work in a single, rapid sitting. When not in the countryside, he paints inside a yellow room in a yellow house. He begins to contemplate the fleeting nature of some subjects of still life. He also thinks about seasonal flowers and the artistic process which renders a permanent and eternal quality to the representation of flowers on canvas, which does not wilt and wither.

For a while, Vincent's preferred medium becomes a large sketchbook given to him by Madame Ginoux which he begins to fill with renderings of landscapes in pen and ink. He continues to ponder various philosophical and existential questions such as his desire "not to see a landscape but only the eternity behind it", and that "there cannot be such a thing as nature without there also being a meaning to nature". He wishes to devote increasing time to rendering the landscapes. A group of schoolchildren and their teacher mock Vincent and his work and he chases them away. The teacher and her students call him crazy as they run away in fear. On his walk home some boys throw rocks at him. When he chases the boys some townsmen subdue him and report him to the local psychiatric hospital. His brother Theo is called to Arles from Paris, who in turn convinces Paul Gauguin to agree to visit Vincent. Gauguin soon arrives in Arles.

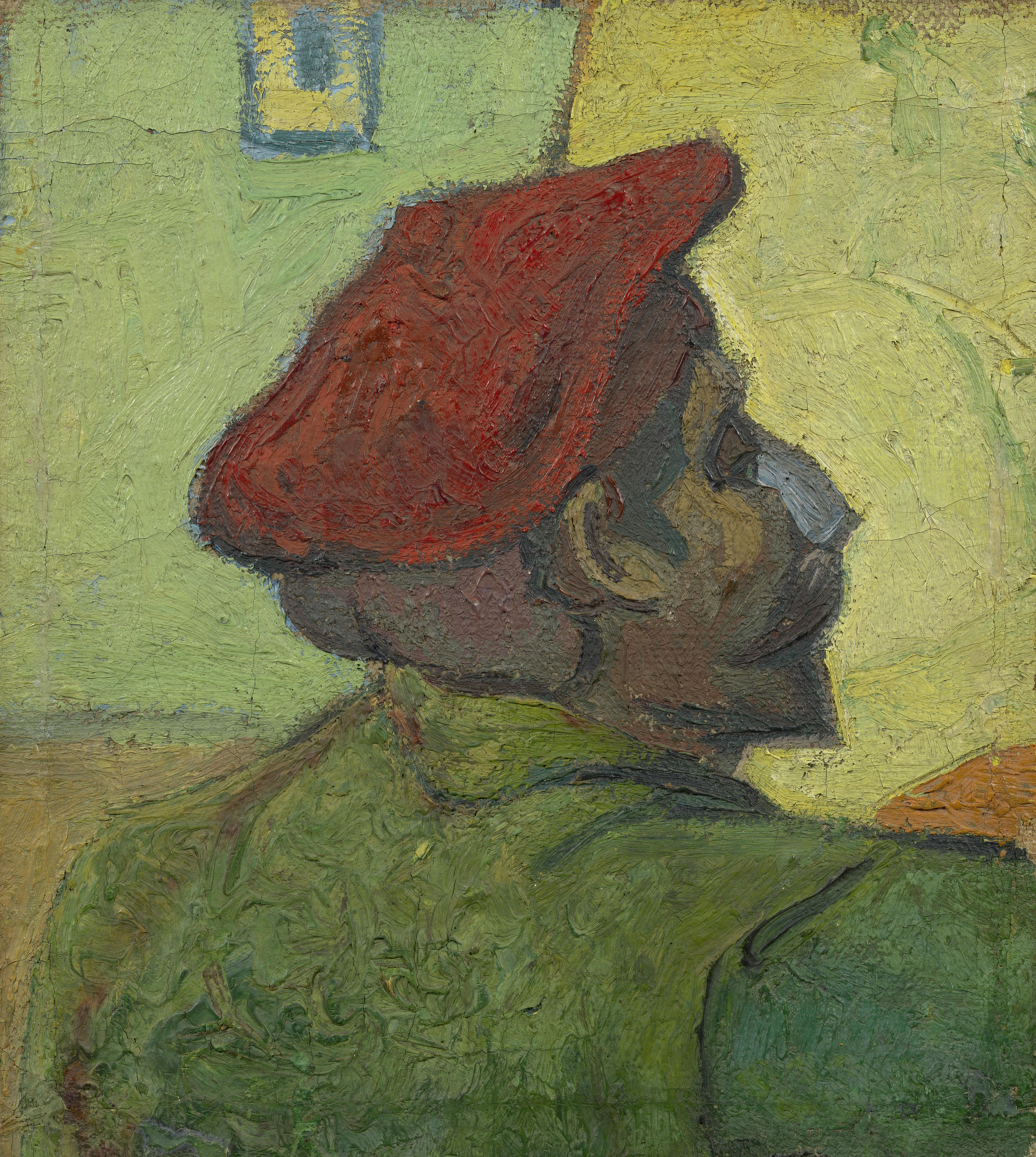
Vincent van Gogh painted Paul Gauguin (Man in a Red Beret) in 1888 in Arles. Currently at the Van Gogh Museum in Amsterdam

Vincent is at first exhilarated by the presence of Gauguin, though things quickly sour. When Gauguin announces that he will soon depart, the news crushes Vincent. He then cuts off a piece of his ear to show Gauguin his artistic allegiance to his work, but Gauguin has already departed. Vincent then gives the piece of his cut ear to a Madame Ginoux's barkeeper, Gaby, who is horrified and reports him to the authorities. He is sent by Doctor Ray to a mental asylum in nearby Saint-Rémy-de-Provence. There, he has a conversation with a sympathetic, supervising priest about his art and the nature of God. The priest releases Vincent, who travels to Auvers-sur-Oise since the town authorities in Arles deny him permission to stay.

In his last months, Vincent returns to drawing and painting scenes and landscapes, now in Auvers. While painting in the courtyard of a deserted estate, two teenagers with their hunting weapons see him and begin playing at cowboys-and-Indians. During the horsing around disrupting Vincent's painting, a shot goes off. He is hit by the bullet, and the boys beg him not to tell anyone. The boys then bury Vincent's painting and throw their guns into a river while he returns to Auvers. Doctor Gachet is summoned and questions Vincent about the wound; Vincent states the wound is self-inflicted. Theo is called for from Paris, but finds his brother dead upon arrival. Theo organizes an open-casket funeral for Vincent surrounded by his paintings.

A closing onscreen text states that Vincent died in 1890 at the age of 37 from a bullet wound 30 hours after being shot. His completed sketchbook (a gift to Madame Ginoux) was not discovered until 126 years later in 2016. A mid-credits scene features a narration by Gauguin regarding Vincent's favorite color: yellow.

== Cast ==
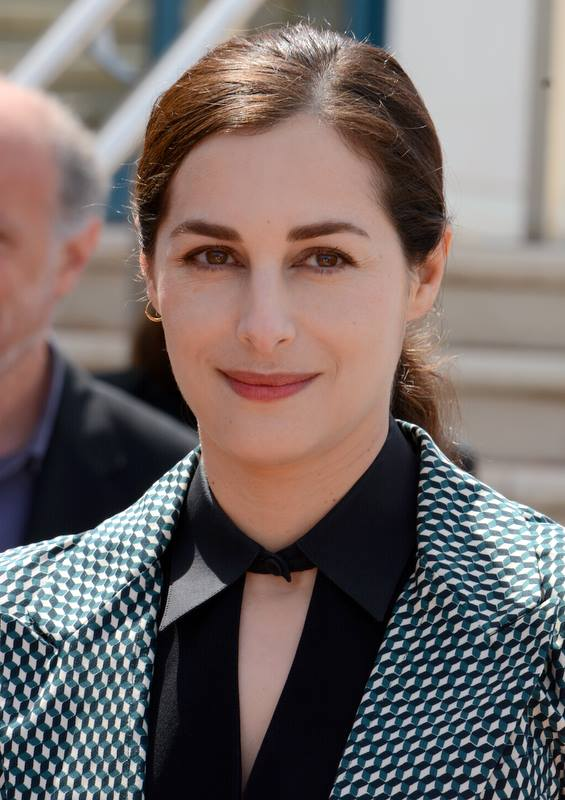
Amira Casar portrayed Johanna van Gogh-Bonger, van Gogh's brother's wife who translated letters between the brothers after Vincent's death

- Willem Dafoe as Vincent van Gogh
- Rupert Friend as Theo van Gogh
- Mads Mikkelsen as The Priest
- Mathieu Amalric as Dr. Paul Gachet
- Emmanuelle Seigner as The Woman from Arles/Madame Ginoux
- Oscar Isaac as Paul Gauguin
- Niels Arestrup as Madman
- Vladimir Consigny as Doctor Felix Ray
- Stella Schnabel as Gaby
- Amira Casar as Johanna van Gogh-Bonger
- Vincent Perez as The Director
- Anne Consigny as Teacher
- Alexis Michalik as Artist Tambourin
- Lolita Chammah as Girl on the Road
- Didier Jarre as Asylum Guard
- Vincent Grass as Café Owner
- Laurent Bateau as Joseph Roulin
- Louis Garrel as Aurier's Article (voice)

== Production ==
In May 2017, Schnabel announced that he would direct a film about the painter Vincent van Gogh, with Willem Dafoe cast in the role. For the film, Schnabel adapts Naifeh and Smith's theory that van Gogh died through the mischief of others rather than by suicide as the premise for the screenplay of the film. The film is dedicated to the Tunisian fashion designer Azzedine Alaïa.

=== Writing ===
The film was written by Schnabel and French screenwriter Jean-Claude Carrière along with Schnabel's life partner Louise Kugelberg. In regards to the story, Schnabel said:

This is a film about painting and a painter and their relationship to infinity. It is told by a painter. It contains what I felt were essential moments in his life; this is not the official history – it's my version. One that I hope could make you closer to him.

==== The Naifeh-Smith theory ====
In 2011, authors Steven Naifeh and Gregory White Smith published a biography, Van Gogh: The Life, in which they challenged the conventional account of the artist's death. In the book, Naifeh and Smith argue that it was unlikely for van Gogh to have killed himself, noting the upbeat disposition of the paintings he created immediately preceding his death; furthermore, in private correspondence, van Gogh described suicide as sinful and immoral. The authors also question how van Gogh could have traveled the mile-long (about 2 km) distance between the wheat field and the inn after sustaining the fatal stomach wound, how van Gogh could have obtained a gun despite his well-known mental health problems, and why van Gogh's painting gear was never found by the police.

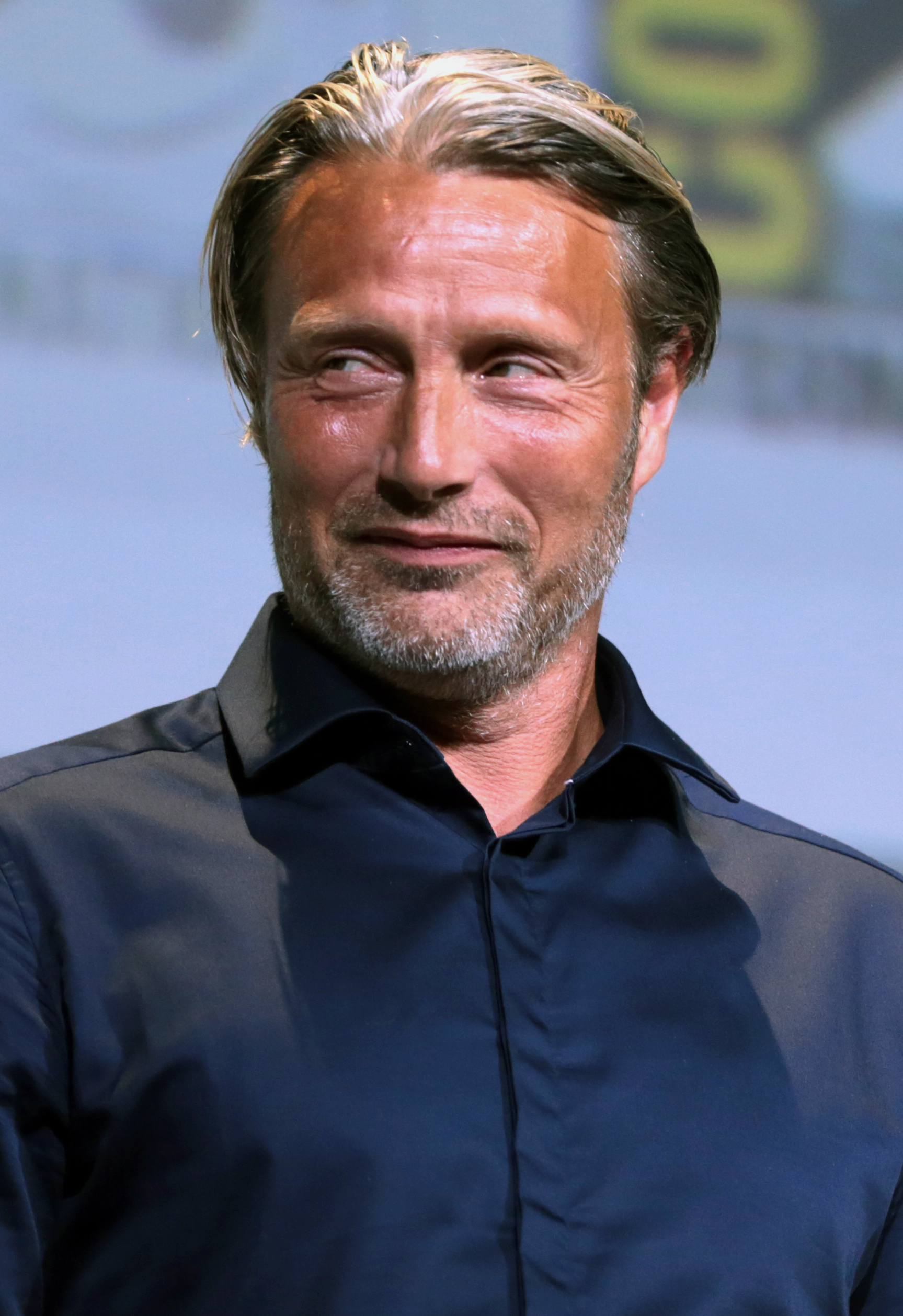
Mads Mikkelsen portrayed the pastor who arranged van Gogh's release from hospital to continue painting in Auvers-sur-Oise.

Naifeh and Smith developed an alternative hypothesis in which van Gogh did not commit suicide, but rather was a possible victim of accidental manslaughter or foul play. Naifeh and Smith point out that the bullet entered van Gogh's abdomen at an oblique angle, not straight as might be expected from a suicide. They claim that van Gogh was acquainted with the boys who may have shot him, one of whom was in the habit of wearing a cowboy suit, and had gone drinking with them. Naifeh said: "So you have a couple of teenagers who have a malfunctioning gun, you have a boy who likes to play cowboy, you have three people probably all of whom had too much to drink." Naifeh concluded that "accidental homicide" was "far more likely". The authors contend that art historian John Rewald visited Auvers in the 1930s, and recorded the version of events that is widely believed. The authors postulate that after he was fatally wounded, van Gogh welcomed death and believed the boys had done him a favour, hence his widely quoted deathbed remark: "Do not accuse anyone... it is I who wanted to kill myself." Schnabel adapts Naifeh and Smith's theory for the screenplay of the film. However, most experts disagree with Naifeh and Smith's theory.

=== Casting ===
According to Éntertainment Weekly, "Dafoe immersed himself in the artist's life, learning to paint, reading his letters, and ultimately shooting on location in artistically recognizable landscapes". Dafoe added, "You're not illustrating who you think van Gogh is; you're communing (with) his memory and what he's left behind... It all comes together in a swirl—a swirl of color, a swirl of light. It's not naturalistic representation. But it captures the spirit... [van Gogh] thought art was a language; art was a way of seeing; art was a way of waking up."

In an article for 'W' magazine, Dafoe further stated, "I painted in a movie called To Live and Die in L.A., but it wasn't about painting—it was more about counterfeiting and killing people. In playing Vincent van Gogh, painting was the key to the character. I had to know what I was doing. The director, Julian Schnabel, would say, 'Hold the brush like a sword' and 'There's no such thing as a bad mark.' I began to think that painting is about making an accumulation of marks. Acting is the same: You create a character scene by scene. It's a series of marks that start a rhythm, and that rhythm sends you where you need to go." It was noted that Dafoe was 62 at the time of filming, 25 years older than van Gogh when he died.

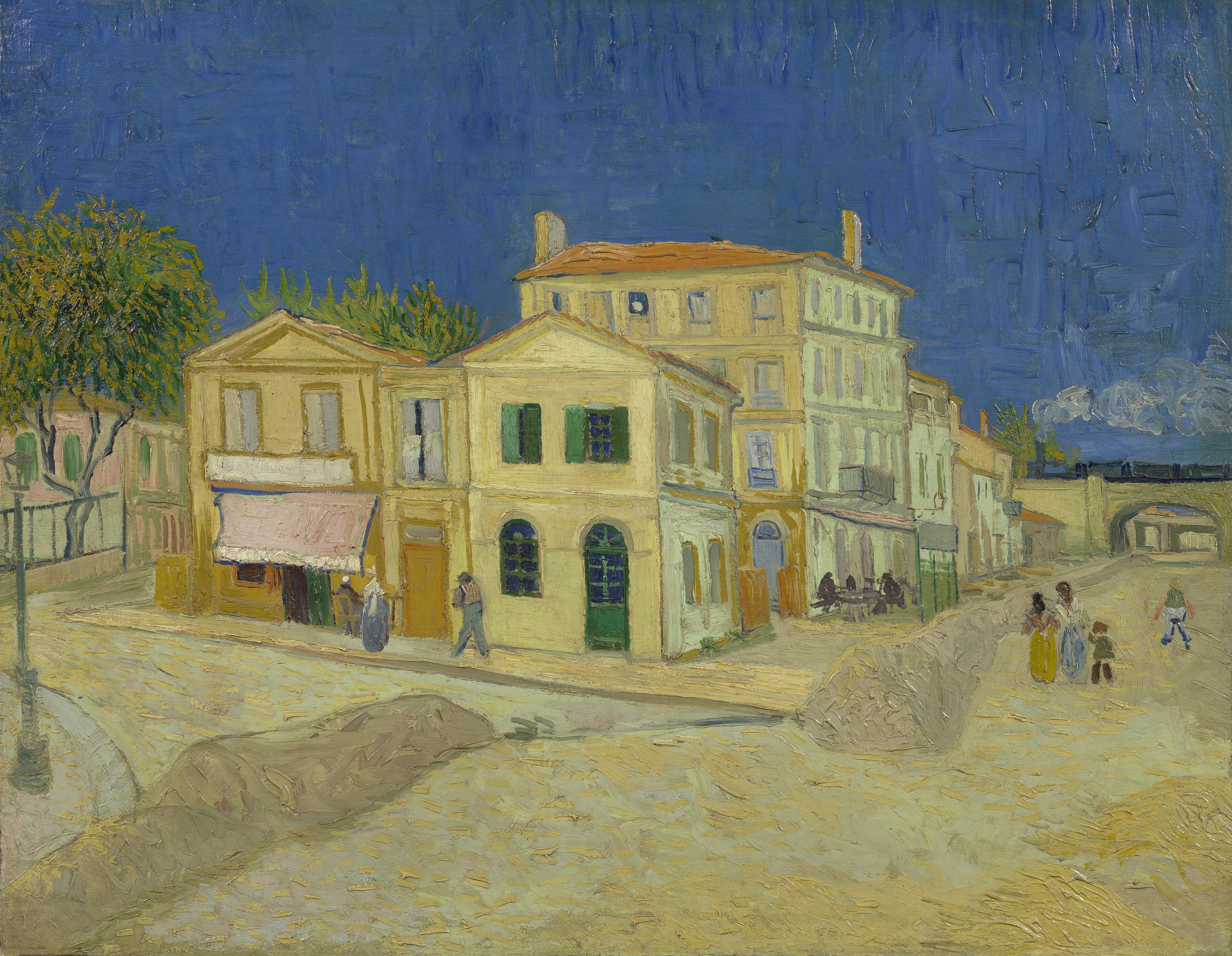
The Yellow House, Arles, 1888. The room and house where van Gogh resided in Arles has since been demolished and converted into a local park. Van Gogh Museum, Amsterdam.

=== Photography ===
The film was shot over 38 days beginning in September 2017 on location in Arles, Bouches-du-Rhône and Auvers-sur-Oise, France, all locations where van Gogh lived during his final years.

=== Soundtrack ===
The soundtrack for the film was composed by Tatiana Lisovskaya. The music is predominantly for solo piano in a minimalist classical tone with occasional accompaniment by solo instruments and string quartet. The soundtrack contains 16 tracks and was released in 2018.

== Release ==
In May 2018, CBS Films acquired distribution rights to the film. It had its world premiere at the 75th Venice International Film Festival on September 3, 2018. It was also screened at the New York Film Festival on October 12, 2018. The film was released in the United States on November 16, 2018. It was released for streaming on Netflix in France, beginning on February 15, 2019. The film was released simultaneously in theaters and on-demand in the United Kingdom on March 29, 2019, by Curzon Artificial Eye.

=== Home media ===
At Eternity's Gate was released on Digital HD on January 29, 2019, and on Blu-ray and DVD on February 12. Special features included an audio commentary with Julian Schnabel and Louise Kugelberg and three featurettes.

== Reception ==
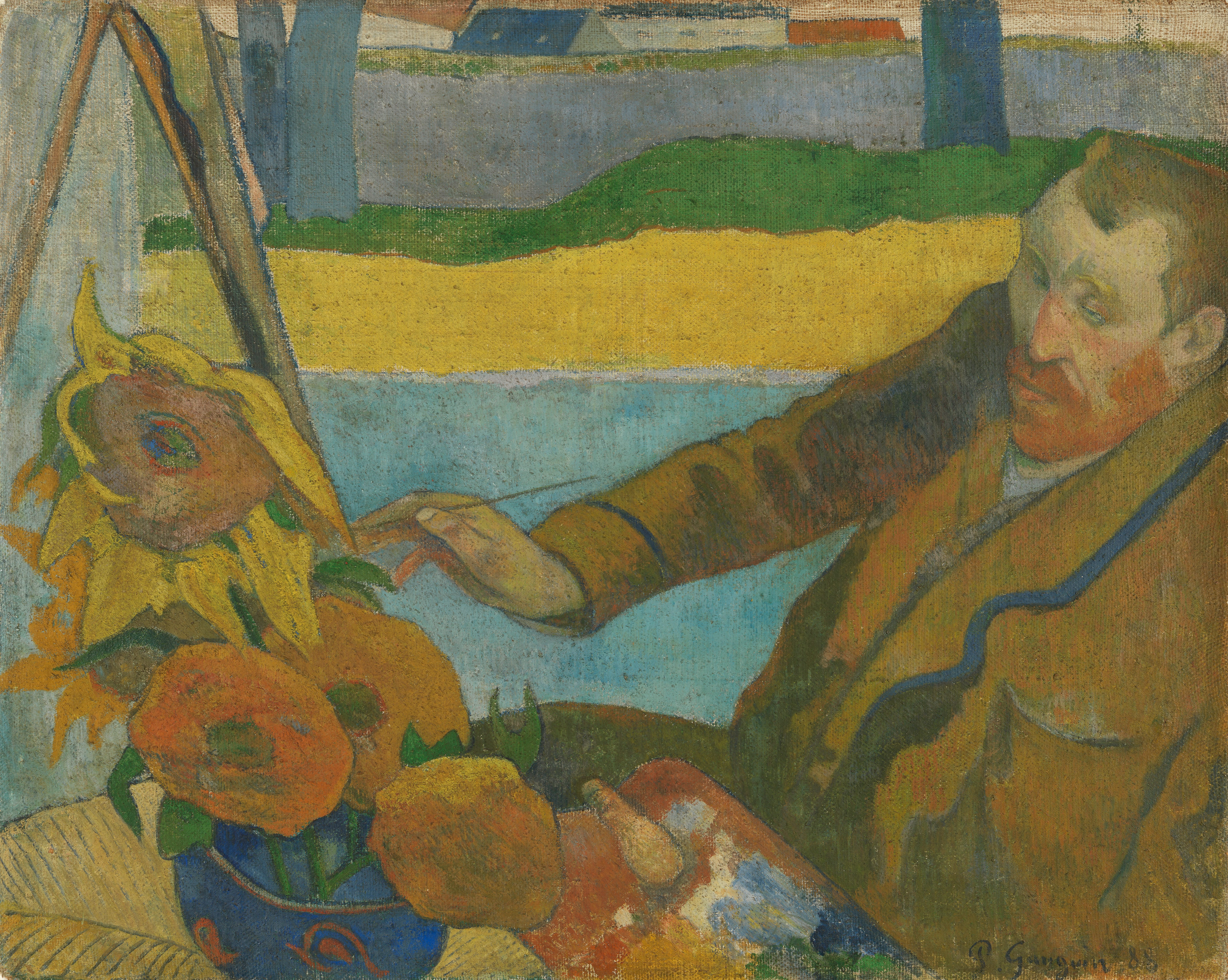
Paul Gauguin painted The Painter of Sunflowers: Portrait of Vincent van Gogh in 1888 in Arles. Currently at the Van Gogh Museum in Amsterdam.

On review aggregator Rotten Tomatoes, the film holds an approval rating of 79% based on 192 reviews, with an average rating of 7.2/10. The website's critical consensus reads, "Led by mesmerizing work from Willem Dafoe in the central role, At Eternity's Gate intriguingly imagines Vincent Van Gogh's troubled final days." Metacritic gives the film a weighted average score of 76 out of 100, based on 34 critics, indicating "generally favorable" reviews.

Manohla Dargis writing for The New York Times gave the film a strong review stating that the film is, "a vivid, intensely affecting portrait of Vincent van Gogh toward the end of his life, the artist walks and walks. Head bowed, he looks like a man on a mission, though at other times he seems more like a man at prayer." Adam Graham wrote, for the Detroit News: "Dafoe adds another masterful performance to his resume; his work here is as deep and as piercing as his performance in The Last Temptation of Christ more than 30 years ago."

=== Awards and nominations ===
Year	Award	Category	Nominee	Result
2019	Academy Awards	Best Actor	Willem Dafoe	Nominated
2019	Golden Globe Awards	Best Actor – Motion Picture Drama	Willem Dafoe	Nominated
2019	Critics' Choice Awards	Best Actor	Willem Dafoe	Nominated
2019	Satellite Awards	Best Actor in a Motion Picture, Drama	Willem Dafoe	Won
2018	Venice International Film Festival	Golden Lion	At Eternity's Gate	Nominated
2018	Venice International Film Festival	Fondazione Mimmo Rotella Award	Willem Dafoe and Julian Schnabel	Won
2018	Venice International Film Festival	Green Drop Award	Willem Dafoe and Julian Schnabel	Won
2018	Venice International Film Festival	Volpi Cup for Best Actor	Willem Dafoe	Won

== See also ==
- Van Gogh (1991 film)
