= DeFeo =

DeFeo is a surname. Notable people with the surname include:

- Jay DeFeo (1929–1989), American artist
- Peter DeFeo (1902–1993), American mobster
- Ronald DeFeo Jr. (1951–2021), American mass murderer
- Ubi de Feo (born 1974), Italian educator
- Vincenzo De Feo (1876–1955), Italian admiral
