= 76th Locarno Film Festival =

Swiss film festival

- Closing film: Shayda by Noora Niasari
- Location: Locarno, Switzerland
- Founded: 1946
- Awards: Golden Leopard: Critical Zone
- Hosted by: Associazione Festival del film Locarno
- Artistic director: Giona A. Nazzaro
- Festival date: Opening: 2 August 2023; Closing: 12 August 2023
- Website: LFF

Locarno Film Festival
- 77th 75th

The 76th annual Locarno Festival was held from 2 August to 12 August 2023 in Locarno, Switzerland.

French actor Lambert Wilson was the head of the Main Competition Jury. American filmmaker Harmony Korine received the Pardo d’Onore Manor.

The Iranian film Critical Zone, directed by Ali Ahmadzadeh, was the winner of the Golden Leopard, the festival's top prize. Radu Jude's Do Not Expect Too Much from the End of the World won the Special Jury Prize.

For this year's edition, the acting categories (Best Actor/Best Actress) became gender-neutral after the creation of the Best Performance category. In the Main Competition, the winners were Dimitra Vlagopoulou for Animal and Renée Soutendijk for Sweet Dreams.

== Juries ==
=== Concorso Internazionale - Main Competition ===
- Lambert Wilson, French actor - Jury President
- Charlotte Wells, Scottish filmmaker
- Matthijs Wouter Knol, Dutch CEO and Director of the European Film Academy
- Lesli Klainberg, President of Film at Lincoln Center
- Zar Amir Ebrahimi, Iranian actress and producer

=== Filmmakers of the Present Competition ===
- Beatrice Fiorentino, Italian General Delegate of the Film Critics’ Week at the Venice Film Festival
- Erige Sehiri, French-Tunisian director
- Helena Wittmann, German filmmaker

=== Leopard of Tomorrow ===
- Matthew Rankin, Canadian filmmaker
- Amos Sussigan, Swiss director and production designer
- Ewa Puszczyńska, Polish producer

=== First Feature ===
- Devika Girish, Indian-American film critic and programmer
- Omar El Zohairy, Egyptian filmmaker
- Isabel Sandoval, Filipina filmmaker

=== Pardo Verde Ricola (Green Leopard) ===
- Firouzeh Khosrovani, Iranian filmmaker
- Arami Ullón, Swiss-Paraguayan director, screenwriter and producer
- Moussa Sene Absa, Senegalese filmmaker and painter

== Official Sections ==
=== Piazza Grande ===
17 films, including 9 world premieres, were screened at the Piazza Grande, Locarno's open-air theater that accommodates a nightly audience of up to 8,000 people:

English title	Original title	Director(s)	Production country
Anatomy of a Fall	Anatomie d'une chute	Justine Triet	France
Antarctica Calling	Continent Magnétique	Luc Jacquet	France
The Beautiful Summer	La Bella Estate	Laura Luchetti	Italy
City of Women (1980)	La città delle donne	Federico Fellini	Italy
Dammi		Yann Mounir Demange	France
The Falling Star	L'Étoile Filante	Dominique Abel and Fiona Gordon	France, Belgium
Falling Stars		Richard Karpala, Gabriel Bienczycki	United States
Guardians of the Formula	Čuvari formule	Dragan Bjelogrlić	Serbia, Slovenia, Montenegro, North Macedonia
The Old Oak		Ken Loach	United Kingdom, Belgium
La Paloma (1974)		Daniel Schmid	Switzerland, France
First Case	Première affaire	Victoria Musiedlak	France
Shayda (closing film)		Noora Niasari	Australia
Smugglers	밀수	Ryoo Seung-wan	South Korea
Non sono quello che sono - The Tragedy of Othello di W. Shakespeare	I Am Not What I Am - The Tragedy of Othello by W. Shakespeare	Edoardo Leo	Italy
Theater Camp		Molly Gordon, Nick Lieberman	United States
The Path of Excellence	La Voie Royale	Frédéric Mermoud	Switzerland, France
Piazza Grande: Pre-festival
Chicken for Linda!	Linda veut du poulet!	Chiara Malta, Sébastien Laudenbach	France, Italy

=== Main Competition (Concorso Internazionale) ===
The Concorso internazionale explores new territories in moviemaking. This year's selection of 17 titles, all world premieres and one as an international premiere, will be competing for the Pardo d’oro:

English title	Original title	Director(s)	Production country
Animal		Sofia Exarchou	Greece, Austria, Romania, Cyprus, Bulgaria
Critical Zone	منطقه بحرانی	Ali Ahmadzadeh	Iran, Germany
Do Not Expect Too Much from the End of the World	Nu aștepta prea mult de la sfârșitul lumii	Radu Jude	Romania, Luxembourg, France, Croatia
Essential Truths of the Lake		Lav Diaz	Philippines, France, Portugal, Singapore, Italy, Switzerland, United Kingdom
Home	Baan	Leonor Teles	Portugal
The Human Surge 3	El auge del humano 3	Eduardo Williams	Argentina, Portugal, Netherlands, Taiwan, Brazil, Hong Kong, Sri Lanka, Peru
The Invisible Fight	Nähtamatu võitlus	Rainer Sarnet	Estonia, Latvia, Greece, Finland
Lousy Carter		Bob Byington	United States
Manga D'Terra		Basil Da Cunha	Switzerland, Portugal
Obscure Night - Goodbye Here, Anywhere	Nuit obscure - Au revoir ici, n'importe où	Sylvain George	France, Switzerland
Patagonia		Simone Bozzelli	Italy
The Permanent Picture	La imatge permanent	Laura Ferrés	Spain, France
Rossosperanza		Annarita Zambrano	Italy, France
Stepne		Maryna Vroda	Ukraine, Germany, Poland, Slovakia
Sweet Dreams		Ena Sendijarević	Netherlands, Sweden, Indonesia
The Vanishing Soldier	החייל הנעלם	Dani Rosenberg	Israel
Yannick		Quentin Dupieux	France

=== Out of Competition (Fuori Concorso) ===
The Fuori concorso section features 12 films, of which 11 are world premieres, from outstanding directors’ intent on exploring new possibilities in filmic narration:

English title	Original title	Director(s)	Production country
5 Hectares		Émilie Deleuze	France
Best Secret Place		Caroline Poggi, Jonathan Vinel	France
Bonjour la Langue		Paul Vecchiali	France
Lovano Supreme		Franco Maresco	Italy
Mademoiselle Kenopsia		Denis Côté	Canada
Mimì – Prince of Darkness	Mimì – Il principe delle tenebre	Brando De Sica	Italy
Procida		Antonella Di Nocera	Italy
Ricardo and Painting	Ricardo et la Peinture	Barbet Schroeder	Switzerland, France
She Is Conann		Bertrand Mandico	Luxembourg, France, Belgium
Triggered	Topakk	Richard V. Somes	Philippines, United States
We Barbarians	Nous les Barbares	Bertrand Mandico	Luxembourg, Belgium, France
What Remains		Ran Huang	Hong Kong, United Kingdom, Finland

=== Filmmakers of the Present Competition (Concorso Cineasti del presente) ===
The Concorso Cineasti del presente selection, dedicated to discovering the cinema of tomorrow, comprises 15 films: first and second features, all world premieres:

English title	Original title	Director(s)	Production country
A Good Place	Ein schöner Ort	Katharina Huber	Germany
All the Fires	Todos los Incendios	Mauricio Calderón Rico	Mexico
Bitten	La Morsure	Romain de Saint-Blanquat	France
Camping du Lac		Eléonore Saintagnan	Belgium, France
Dreaming & Dying	Hao jiu bu jian	Nelson Yeo	Singapore, Indonesia
Excursion	Ekskurzija	Una Gunjak	Bosnia-Herzegovina, Croatia, Serbia, France, Norway, Qatar
Family Portrait		Lucy Kerr	United States
Negu hurbilak		Colectivo Negu	Spain
Of Living Without Illusion	Und dass man ohne Täuschung zu leben vermag	Katharina Lüdin	Germany, Switzerland
On the Go		María Gisèle Royo, Julia de Castro	Spain
Rapture	Rimdogittanga	Dominic Sangma	India, China, Switzerland, Netherlands, Qatar
Rivière		Hugues Hariche	Switzerland, France
Touched		Claudia Rorarius	Germany
West Border	西渡	Yan Luo	China
Whispers of Fire & Water		Lubdhak Chatterjee	India

=== Leopard of Tomorrow (Pardi di Domani) ===
The Pardi di domani section, dedicated to short films by emerging Swiss and international directors, combines with auteur shorts competition Concorso Corti d’autore to screen a total of 40 films, all presented as world premieres. The selection is completed by the collection of short films made during the Spring Academy, led this year by director Radu Jude:

==== Concorso Internazionale ====
English title	Original title	Director(s)	Production country
A Bird Called Memory	Pássaro Memória	Leonardo Martinelli	Brazil, United Kingdom
As if Mother Cried That Night	Engar madaram geriste bud aan shab	Hoda Taheri	Germany
A Study of Empathy	En undersøgelse af empati	Hilke Rönnfeldt	Denmark, Germany
A Tortoise's Year of Fate	Yi zhi wu gui de ben ming nian	Yi Xiong	China
The Currency - Sensing 1 Agbogbloshie		Elom 20ce, Musquiqui Chihying, Gregor Kasper	Germany, Taiwan, Togo
De Imperio		Alessandro Novelli	Portugal, Spain
Du bist so wunderbar		Leandro Goddinho, Paulo Menezes	Germany, Brazil
Full Night	Pleine Nuit	Manon Coubia	Belgium, France
The Guard	Negahban	Amirhossein Shojaei	Iran
i look into the mirror and repeat to myself		Giselle Lin	Singapore
Kinderfilm		Total Refusal, Adrian Jonas Haim, Michael Stumpf, Robin Klengel	Austria
The Lovers		Carolina Sandvik	Sweden
Making Babies	Faire un enfant	Eric K. Boulianne	Canada
The Moon Will Contain Us	Solo la luna comprenderá	Kim Torres	Costa Rica, United States
Pray		Caleb Azumah Nelson	United Kingdom
Scorched Earth		Markela Kontaratou	Greece, United Kingdom
Slimane		Carlos Pereira	Germany
La Vedova Nera		fiume, Julian McKinnon	France
The Waves	Pado	Yumi Joung	South Korea
Z.O.		Loris G. Nese	Italy

==== Concorso Nazionale ====
English title	Original title	Director(s)	Production country
About a Cow	O krávě	Pavla Baštanová	Czech Republic, Switzerland
Alexx196 & the pink sand beach	Alexx196 & la plage de sable rose	Loïc Hobi	Switzerland, France
Duck	Canard	Elie Chapuis	Switzerland, Belgium
Ever Since, I Have Been Flying	O gün bu gündür, uçuyorum	Aylin Gökmen	Switzerland
The Island		Julien Pujol	France, Estonia
Jaima		Francesco Pereira	Switzerland
Last Night	Letzte Nacht	Lea Bloch	Switzerland
NIGHT SHIFT		Kayije Kagame, Hugo Radi	Switzerland
Remember, Broken Crayons Colour Too		Urša Kastelic, Shannet Clemmings	Switzerland
Searching for the 5th Direction		Matthias Herr Schüpbach	Switzerland

==== Concorso Corti d’Autore ====
English title	Original title	Director(s)	Production country
Been There		Corina Schwingruber Ilić	Switzerland
iNTELLIGENCE		Jeanne Frenkel, Cosme Castro	France
I Used to Live There		Ryan McKenna	Canada
Kill 'Em All	Mátalos a todos	Sebastian Molina Ruiz	Mexico
Loving in Between		Jyoti Mistry	Austria, South Africa
My Mother Is a Saint	I mitera mou ine agia	Syllas Tzoumerkas	Greece
Nocturne for a Forest	Nocturno para uma floresta	Catarina Vasconcelos	Portugal
The Passing		Ivete Lucas, Patrick Bresnan	United States
Rainer, a Vicious Dog in a Skull Valley		Bertrand Mandico	France
Valley Pride		Lukas Marxt	Austria, Germany

==== Pardi di Domani: Special event ====
Original title	Director(s)	Production country
Find a Film!	Coline Confort, Slava Doytcheva, Federico Frefel, Alessandro Garbuio, Andrea Gatopoulos, Ambra Guidotti, Jumana Issa, Zhenia Kazankina, Bohao Liu, Diego Andres Murillo, Chiara Toffoletto	Switzerland

=== Open Doors: Screenings ===
In the second of three years dedicated to cinemas in Latin America and the Caribbean, Open Doors will offer an overview of the most interesting independent productions from its current focus region. For the Open Doors Screenings, this year's focus will be on film from South American continent, with 18 long, medium and short films, of which one is a world premiere:

English title	Original title	Director(s)	Production country
98 Seconds Without Shadow (2021)	98 Segundos sin Sombra	Juan Pablo Richter	Bolivia
Autoerótica (2021)		Andrea Fernanda Hoyos Valderrama	Peru
Boreal (2022)		Federico Adorno	Paraguay, Mexico
Me & The Beasts (2021)	Yo y las Bestias	Nico Manzano	Venezuela
Once Upon a Time in Venezuela (2020)	Érase una vez en Venezuela	Anabel Rodríguez Ríos	Venezuela, United Kingdom, Austria, Brazil
The Preacher (2021)	El Rezador	Tito Jara H.	Ecuador, Colombia, Spain
The Shape of Things to Come (2021)	Tiempos Futuros	Víctor Checa	Peru, Germany, Spain, Mexico, Ecuador
Short Films
Angelo (2022)		Alex Plumb	Bolivia
The Distance of Time (2021)	La distancia del Tiempo	Carlos Ormeño Palma	Peru
Eating Papaw On The Seashore (2022)		Rae Wiltshire, Nickose Layne	Guyana
Hidden World (2018)		Kenrich Cairo	Suriname, Netherlands
Plástico (2022)		Vero Kompalic	Venezuela
The Red Spiral (2021)	La Espiral Roja	Lorena Colmenares	Venezuela, Germany
Rimana Wasi: Home of Stories (2022)	Rimana Wasi: Hogar de Historias	Ximena Málaga Sabogal, Piotr Turlej	Peru
Volivia (2014)		Leandro Grillo	Bolivia
What Do You See? (2019)	Veo, veo	Tania Cattebeke Laconich	Paraguay
Willkawiwa (The Sacred Fire of the Dead) (2022)	Willkawiwa (El Sagrado Fuego de los Muertos)	Pável Quevedo Ullauri	Ecuador, Costa Rica
You Can Read, Can't You? (2018)	Je kan toch lezen	Ananta Khemradj	Suriname, Netherlands

=== Histoire(s) du Cinéma ===
Unprecedented perspectives on movie history with 18 films, including prestigious restored titles, valuable rediscoveries and works that have become part of the collective imagination:

English title	Original title	Director(s)	Production country
Abismu (1977)		Rogério Sganzerla	Brazil
Alphaville (1965)	Alphaville, une étrange aventure de Lemmy Caution	Jean-Luc Godard	France
California Straight Ahead (1925)		Harry A. Pollard	United States
Documentário (1966)		Rogério Sganzerla	Brazil
Final Report (2020)	Zárójelentés	István Szabó	Hungary
The Lodger A Story of the London Fog (1927) (opening film)		Alfred Hitchcock	United Kingdom
Pardo d'onore Manor: Harmony Korine
Gummo (1997)		Harmony Korine	United States
Spring Breakers (2012)		Harmony Korine	United States
Cinéma Suisse Redécouvert - Heritage Online
If the Sun Never Returns (1987)	Si le soleil ne revenait pas	Claude Goretta	Switzerland, France
Heritage Online
The Gate of Sun (2004)	باب الشمس	Yousry Nasrallah	France, Egypt, Morocco, Denmark, Belgium
Sergio Leone: The Italian Who Invented America (2022)	Sergio Leone - L'italiano che inventò l'America	Francesco Zippel	Italy
TAMARO. Stones and Angels. Mario Botta Enzo Cucchi (1998)	TAMARO. Pietre e angeli. Mario Botta Enzo Cucchi	Villi Hermann	Switzerland
Pardo alla carriera Ascona-Locarno Turismo
Days (2020)	日子	Tsai Ming-liang	Taiwan, France
Premio Cinema Ticino
Waalo Fendo - Where the Earth Freezes (1997)	Waalo Fendo (là où la terre gèle)	Mohammed Soudani	Switzerland
Raimondo Rezzonico Award: Marianne Slot
Woman at War (2018)	Kona fer í stríð	Benedikt Erlingsson	Iceland, France, Ukraine
Vision Award Ticinomoda: Pietro Scalia
Black Hawk Down (2001)		Ridley Scott	United States, United Kingdom
Good Will Hunting (1997)		Gus Van Sant	United States
Excellence Award Davide Campari: Riz Ahmed
Mogul Mowgli (2020)		Bassam Tariq	United Kingdom, United States

=== Retrospettiva ===
“Espectáculo a diario – Las distintas temporadas del cine popular mexicano” (“Spectacle Every Day – The Many Seasons of Mexican Popular Cinema”) will offer an intensive investigation of Mexican filmmaking from the 1940s to the end of the 1960s, covering decades hallmarked by astonishing creativity and peppered with stars of the silver screen and one-of-a-kind directors who were an inspiration for generations. This year's Retrospective is curated by Olaf Möller, in collaboration with Roberto Turigliatto. A collection of essays in Spanish and English to accompany the event, curated by Jorge Javier Negrete Camacho and Alonso Díaz de la Vega, will be published by Les éditions de l’Œil:

English title	Original title	Director(s)	Production country
Amok (1944)		Antonio Momplet	Mexico
Autumn Days (1963)	Días de Otoño	Roberto Gavaldón	Mexico
The Batwoman (1968)	La Mujer Murciélago	René Cardona	Mexico
The Black Ace (1944)	El as Negro	René Cardona	Mexico
The Black Pit of Dr. M (1958)	Misterios de Ultratumba	Fernando Méndez	Mexico
Carry me in your Arms (1954)	Llévame en tus razos	Julio Bracho	Mexico
The Case of the Wee Murdered Woman (1955)	El Caso de la Mujer Asesinadita	Tito Davison	Mexico
La Corte de Faraón (1944)		Julio Bracho	Mexico
Corner, Stop (1948)	Esquina, Bajan...!	Alejandro Galindo	Mexico
El medallón del crimen (El 13 de oro) (1956)		Juan Bustillo Oro	Mexico
Girls in Uniform (1951)	Muchachas de Uniforme	Alfredo B. Crevenna	Mexico
The Great Champion (1949)	El Gran Campeón	Chano Urueta	Mexico
In the Times of Don Porfirio (1940)	En Tiempos de Don Porfirio	Juan Bustillo Oro	Mexico
The King of the Neighborhood (1949)	El Rey del Barrio	Gilberto Martínez Solares	Mexico
Más Fuerte que el Amor (1955)		Tulio Demicheli	Mexico, Cuba
May God Forgive Me (1948)	Que Dios me Perdone	Tito Davison	Mexico
La Mente y el Crimen (1961)		Alejandro Galindo	Mexico
My Son, the Hero (1961)	Los Hermanos del Hierro	Ismael Rodríguez	Mexico
Música de Siempre (1956)		Tito Davison	Mexico
The Night Falls (1952)	La Noche Avanza	Roberto Gavaldón	Mexico
The Olympics in Mexico (1969)	Olimpiada en México	Alberto Isaac	Mexico
Pueblerina (1949)		Emilio Fernández	Mexico
The River and Death (1954)	El Río y la Muerte	Luis Buñuel	Mexico
Skeleton of Mrs. Morales (1960)	El Esqueleto de la Señora Morales	Rogelio Antonio González	Mexico
The Soft One (1951)	El Suavecito	Fernando Méndez	Mexico
Sword of Granada (1953)	El Corazón y la Espada	Edward Dein, Carlos Véjar Jr.	Mexico
The Three Garcías (1947)	Los Tres García	Ismael Rodríguez	Mexico
Tongolele has been Killed (1948)	Han Matado a Tongolele	Roberto Gavaldón	Mexico
Torero! (1956)		Carlos Velo	Mexico
Santo vs. the Vampire Women (1962)	Santo vs. las Mujeres Vampiro	Alfonso Corona Blake	Mexico
Sensuality (1951)	Sensualidad	Alberto Gout	Mexico
Streetwalker (1951)	Trotacalles	Matilde Landeta	Mexico
Forgotten Faces (1952)	Rostros Olvidados	Julio Bracho	Mexico
The Unknown Policeman (1941)	El Gendarme Desconocido	Miguel Melitón Delgado	Mexico
Wetbacks (1955)	Espaldas Mojadas	Alejandro Galindo	Mexico
The Witch's Mirror (1960)	El Espejo de la Bruja	Chano Urueta	Mexico

=== Locarno Kids: Screenings ===
A rite of passage into the movies, with 8 titles for children and teenagers, featuring exclusive premieres, golden oldies, and forays into the world of animation:

English title	Original title	Director(s)	Production country
A Greyhound of a Girl (2023)	Mary e lo Spirito di Mezzanotte	Enzo d'Alò	Luxembourg, Italy, Ireland, United Kingdom, Estonia, Latvia, Germany
The Kid (1921)		Charles Chaplin	United States
March of the Penguins (2005)	La Marche de l'Empereur	Luc Jacquet	France
Nina and the Hedghog's Secret (2023)	Nina et le Secret du Hérisson	Alain Gagnol, Jean-Loup Felicioli	France, Luxembourg
The Singing Princess (1949)	La Rosa di Bagdad	Anton Gino Domenighini	Italy
Snot & Splash (2023)	Räkä ja Roiskis	Teemu Nikki	Finland
Tales of Franz (2022)	Geschichten vom Franz	Johannes Schmid	Austria, Germany
We Have a Dream (2023)		Pascal Plisson	France

== Independent Sections ==
=== International Critics' Week (Semaine de la Critique) ===
Founded in 1990, the Semaine de la Critique is an independent section within the Locarno Film Festival organized by the Swiss Association of Film Journalists. This year's Locarno's Critics’ Week features 7 full-length documentaries as world or international premieres:

English Title	Original title	Director(s)	Production Country
Archive of the Future	Archiv der Zukunft	Joerg Burger	Austria
The First Days	Les Premiers Jours	Stéphane Breton	France
Monogamia		Ohad Milstein	Israel
The Pathan Sisters	Les Soeurs Pathan	Eléonore Boissinot	France
Prisoners of Fate		Mehdi Sahebi	Switzerland
Under Construction	Wanha Markku	Markus Toivo	Finland
Vista Mare		Julia Gutweniger, Florian Kofler	Austria, Italy

=== Panorama Suisse ===
A selection of titles representing the state of the art in Swiss cinema, chosen by representatives from SWISS FILMS, the Solothurner Filmtage and the Swiss Film Academy, Panorama Suisse presents 10 current Swiss films such as festival successes, audience favorites and films that have not yet been released in theaters. Film lovers from all over the world have the opportunity to discover current Swiss filmmaking in its own dedicated section at the Locarno Festival.:

English Title	Original Title	Director	Production Country
Big Little Women (2022)		Nadia Fares	Switzerland, Egypt
Crows – Nature Is Watching Us (2023)	Krähen – Nature Is Watching Us	Martin Schilt	Switzerland, Austria
Flores del Otro Patio (2022)		Jorge Cadena	Switzerland, Colombia
The Giacomettis (2023)	I Giacometti	Susanna Fanzun	Switzerland
Jill (2022)		Steven Michael Hayes	Switzerland, Germany
The Land Within (2022)		Fisnik Maxville	Switzerland, Kosovo
Longing for the World (2023)	L'Amour du Monde	Jenna Hasse	Switzerland
Pipes (2022)		Jessica Meier, Kilian Feusi, Sujanth Ravichandran	Switzerland
Polish Prayers (2022)		Hanna Nobis	Switzerland, Poland
The Record (2023)		Jonathan Laskar	Switzerland
This Kind of Hope (2023)		Paweł Siczek	Switzerland, Germany
Thunder (2022)	Foudre	Carmen Jaquier	Switzerland
Until Branches Bend (2022)		Sophie Jarvis	Canada, Switzerland

== Special awards ==
=== Leopard of Honour (Pardo d’Onore Manor) ===
- Harmony Korine

=== Premio Raimondo Rezzonico ===
- Marianne Slot

=== Excellence Award Davide Campari ===
- Riz Ahmed

== Official Awards ==
=== Concorso Internazionale - Main Competition ===
- Golden Leopard (Pardo d'oro): Critical Zone by Ali Ahmadzadeh
- Special Jury Prize: Do Not Expect Too Much from the End of the World by Radu Jude
- Pardo for Best Direction: Stepne by Maryna Vroda
- Pardo for Best Performance:
  - Dimitra Vlagopoulou for Animal
  - Renée Soutendijk for Sweet Dreams
- Special Mention: Obscure Night - Goodbye Here, Anywhere by Sylvain George

=== Concorso Cineasti del presente (Filmmakers of the Present Competition) ===
- Golden Leopard - Filmmakers of the Present: Dreaming & Dying by Nelson Yeo
- Best Emerging Director: Katharina Huber for A Good Place
- Special Jury Prize CINÉ+: Camping du Lac by Éléonore Saintagnan
- Pardo for Best Performance
  - Clara Schwinning for A Good Place
  - Isold Halldórudóttir and Stavros Zafeiris for Touched
- Special Mentions:
  - Excursion by Una Gunjak
  - Negu hurbilak by Colectivo Negu
