= Martina Gatti =

Italian actress (born 1996)

- Born: 25 February 1996 (age 30); Rome, Italy
- Occupation: Actress
- Years active: 2018–present

Martina Gatti (born 25 February 1996) is an Italian actress.

== Life and career ==
Born and raised in Rome, Gatti attended the "Ennio Quirino Visconti" Classical High School before graduating in philosophy and psychological sciences at the University of Perugia.

She made her debut in 2018 by starring in the second season of Skam Italia as Emma Covitti. That same year, she played the lead role in Mollami, Matteo Gentiloni's debut film. In 2022, Gatti participated in Abel Ferrara's film Padre Pio, which was premiered at the Giornate degli Autori section of the 79th Venice International Film Festival.

In 2023, Gatti starred as the female lead in Maccio Capatonda's third feature, Il migliore dei mondi, and appeared in the television miniseries Un'estate fa, distributed by Sky Italia. The next year, she co-starred in Filippo Barbagallo's debut film Troppo azzurro.

Alongside Nicolas Maupas and Caterina De Angelis, Gatti was the lead in Luca Lucini's film L'amore, in teoria, released on 24 April 2025.

== Filmography ==
Film
Year	Title	Role	Notes
2018	Mollami	Valentina Cordiale	
2019	AnneFrank. Parallel Stories	KaterinaKat	
2022	Padre Pio	Anna	
2023	Il migliore dei mondi	Viola	
2024	Troppo azzurro	Lara	
2025	L'amore, in teoria	Flor	
2025	Twin Stars	Stella	

Television
Year	Title	Role	Notes
2018–2021	Skam Italia	Emma Covitti	Main role (season 2); recurring or guest role (season 3–5)
2019	The Silence of Water	Nina Ronchetti	TV miniseries
2021	Bangla - La serie	Federica	Episode 1x01
2023	Un'estate fa	Young Costanza	TV miniseries

Music videos
Year	Title	Artist(s)	Director(s)
2025	"Alibi"	Tananai	Luca Lucini (from the film L'amore, in teoria)
