= Deva Cassel =

Italian-French model and actress (born 2004)

- Cassel in 2026
- Born: 12 September 2004 (age 22); Rome, Italy
- Citizenship: Italy; France
- Occupations: Model; actress
- Years active: 2019—present
- Parents: Vincent Cassel (father); Monica Bellucci (mother)
- Relatives: Jean-Pierre Cassel (grandfather); Mathias Cassel (uncle); Cécile Cassel (half-aunt)
- Modeling information
- Height: 5 ft 10 1/2 in (1.79 m)
- Hair color: Brown
- Eye color: Hazel
- Agencies: DNA Models (New York); Karin Models (Paris); The Squad (London); D'Management Group (Milan)

Deva Cassel (born 12 September 2004) is an Italian-French model and actress. The daughter of Italian actress Monica Bellucci and French actor Vincent Cassel, she is a brand ambassador for Cartier and Dior.

Cassel has appeared in numerous Dolce & Gabbana fragrance campaigns, as well as walking their women's "Alta Moda" fashion shows in 2021.

In 2023, she made her acting debut in the romantic drama The Beautiful Summer. In 2025, she played Angelica in the Netflix series The Leopard. In 2026, she made her French film debut with the lead role of Anastasia in The Phantom of the Opera.

== Early life ==
Cassel was born on 12 September 2004 in Rome, Italy, to Italian model and actress Monica Bellucci and French actor Vincent Cassel. She grew up between Italy and France, and has also spent her upbringing in Rio de Janeiro, where her father lived for several years.

She has three younger siblings, two of whom are from her father's other relationships: Léonie (b. 2010), a half-sister, Amazonie (b. 2019), and a half-brother, Caetano (b. 2025), respectively.

Cassel is a polyglot. In addition to her native Italian and French, she also speaks English, Portuguese, and Spanish.

== Career ==
=== Modeling ===
Cassel began her modeling career at the age 14, when she walked the Dolce & Gabbana fashion show in 2019 and has since walked several fashion shows, most notably Courrèges.

She has also fronted several major luxury brand campaigns, most notably Dolce & Gabbana fragrance and beauty campaigns "Shine" (2020), "Dolce Rose" (2021) and "Dolce Lily" (2022), "Sisley Fall" 2023, and Dior beauty campaign in 2024, respectively.

=== Acting ===
Cassel made her acting debut in the period romantic drama film The Beautiful Summer (2023), and starred as Angelica Sedara in the Netflix historical drama series The Leopard (2025).

She portrayed the virgin Mary in the upcoming biblical drama film Zero A. D.: The Birth of Christ, directed by Alejandro Gómez Monteverde, scheduled to be released late 2026. She also starred as Anastasia in the French film adaptation of The Phantom of the Opera in 2026.

== Personal life ==
Since 2023, Cassel has been in a relationship with Italian actor Saul Nanni, whom she met while filming The Leopard.

== Filmography ==
=== Film ===
Key
†	Denotes films that have not yet been released

Year	Title	Role	Notes	Ref.
2023	The Beautiful Summer	Amelia		
2026	The Phantom of the Opera †	Anastasia Marescu		
2026	Zero A. D.: The Birth of Christ †	Virgin Mary		

=== Television ===
Year	Title	Role	Notes	Ref.
2025	The Leopard	Angelica Sedara		
