= Fisnik =

Fisnik is an Albanian male given name, which means "noble". The name may refer to:

- Fisnik Asllani (born 2002), German football player of Albanian origin
- Fisnik Maxville, Kosovo-Swiss filmmaker
- Fisnik Papuçi (born 1983), Kosovo Albanian football player
- Fisnik Rugova (born 1989), Kosovo Albanian basketball player
- Fisnik Zuka (born 1995), Macedonian-Albanian football player
