= Critical Zone =

2023 film by Ali Ahmadzadeh

- Poster
- Persian: منطقه بحرانی
- Directed by: Ali Ahmadzadeh
- Written by: Ali Ahmadzadeh
- Produced by: Sina Ataeian Dena; Ali Ahmadzadeh
- Starring: Amir Pousti
- Cinematography: Abbas Rahimi
- Edited by: Ali Ahmadzadeh; Ashkan Mehri
- Music by: Milad Movahedi
- Production company: Counterintuitive Film (Germany)
- Release date: 10 August 2023 (Locarno)
- Running time: 99 minutes
- Countries: Iran; Germany
- Language: Persian

Critical Zone (Persian: منطقه بحرانی, romanized: Mantagheye bohrani, German: Kritische Zone) is a 2023 drama film written and directed by Ali Ahmadzadeh. It is an Iranian and German co-production, and was shot in secret without permission from Iranian authorities.

Using a cast of non-professional actors, the film follows a drug dealer navigating Tehran's underworld over the course of a night.

The film won the Golden Leopard at the 76th Locarno Film Festival. Ahmadzadeh was pressured by Iranian authorities to not screen his film at the festival, and was unable to attend the premiere after being prohibited from leaving Iran.

== Plot ==
In present-day Tehran, Amir earns his living as a drug dealer. He lives alone in an apartment with his affectionate bulldog Mr. Fred. After returning home from the tunnel system of the city's ring roads with a bag containing, among other things, marijuana, hashish and opium, he sorts the drugs and bakes two trays full of hash cookies. He then gets into his car and meets his customers, to whom he provides relief "like a modern prophet." He is guided through the nighttime city by the female voice of his GPS navigation system, which also warns Amir about roadblocks, speed traps and other dangers. In addition to seemingly lost young men on the side of the road, his customers also include a young yoga teacher for children and an old palliative care patient in a hospital, whom he and a nurse feed the hash cookies to. Amir also supplies a few prostitutes, including a trans man, with drugs for free, while he helps a widow save her son from the throes of addiction by prescribing him a mixture of pills and opium tea. He receives drugs and beer from an Iranian flight attendant coming from Amsterdam in exchange for opium. Amir and the stewardess snort cocaine together and become intimate. Meanwhile, the pair are pursued by unnamed assailants and a car chase ensues.

== Cast ==
- Amir Pousti as Amir
- Shirin Abedinirad
- Alireza Keymanesh
- Saghar Saharkhiz
- Mina Hasanlou
- Saba Bagheri
- Alireza Rastjou
- Maryam Sadeghiyan
- Maman Pari
- Mr. Fred

== Production ==
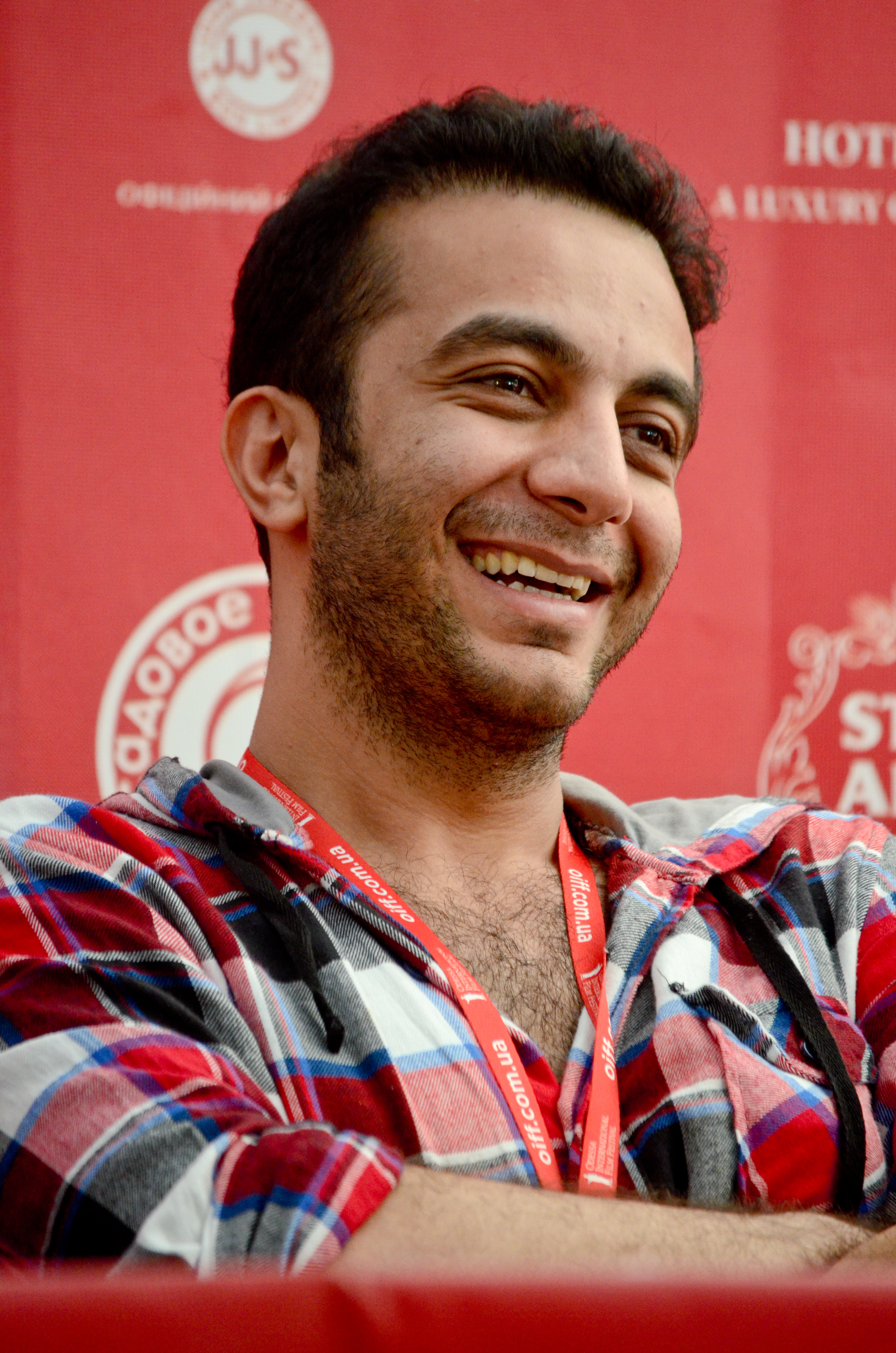
Ali Ahmadzadeh in 2015

Critical Zone is the fourth feature film by Iranian director, screenwriter, producer and editor Ali Ahmadzadeh. In a director's note to the Locarno Film Festival, he explained that he "worked with real people" instead of professional actors. The film was shot on location on the streets of Tehran. It was shot in secret without the normally required permission from Iranian authorities. According to Ahmadzadeh, the film crew "had to hide the camera or find complicated tricks to work around the limitations" of shooting in secrecy. He described the creation process as a "big rebellion", and that showing the film to others would mean an "even bigger victory for us". Three easily hidden mini cameras were said to have been used.

Sina Ataeian Dena, a Berlin-based producer who lives in exile, produced Critical Zone along with Ahmadzadeh. The film was edited by Ahmadzadeh himself. Abbas Rahimi served as director of photography and Milad Movahedi contributed the film score.

== Release ==
It was reported on 10 May 2023 that Paris-based Luxbox acquired the international sales rights to the film and would present it at the Marché du Film in Cannes. On 5 July 2023, Critical Zone was announced as a selection for the Concorso internazionale (international competition) at the 76th Locarno Film Festival. Two days later, Ali Ahmadzadeh was interrogated by the Ministry of Security and accused of shooting a pornographic film. He was pressured by the Iranian authorities to withdraw the film from the Locarno competition and was not allowed to travel to the festival. As a result of the film being shot without government permission, his visa to leave the country was revoked. According to his co-producer Sina Ataeian Dena, Ahmadzadeh has come under investigation by the security ministry and is under constant surveillance by an interrogator who monitors his text messages. He additionally receives threatening messages from anonymous sources. Luxbox and Ataeian Dena similarly reported receiving threatening messages demanding that the film not be shown. According to Ataeian Dena, Ahmadzadeh has resisted the attempts to pressure him and even refused to appear for questioning. Ataeian Dena said, "He doesn't believe in the censorship rules, he stands up for freedom of speech and art. Like many others, he has given up his fear and is part of the protest movement". In addition, Ahmadzadeh is said to have been banned from working for a long time.

The Locarno Film Festival, under artistic director Giona A. Nazzaro, unsuccessfully called on the Iranian government to immediately release Ahmadzadeh. Ataeian Dena expressed fear that the filmmaker could be arrested after the festival. The film had its world premiere at Locarno on 10 August 2023.

== Reception ==
=== Critical response ===
German-language film critics praised Critical Zone after its premiere and largely saw it as a deserving festival winner. Urs Bühler of Neue Zürcher Zeitung praised Critical Zone in a festival summary as "a fascinatingly intoxicating trip through Tehran".

Swiss journalist Michael Sennhauser evaluated it as a leisurely film that presents its central metaphor in variations. Sennhauser writes that Ahmadzadeh shows "an alternative form of social life in Iran [...] a depiction of a life that cannot be endured sober."

Daniel Kothenschulte of Frankfurter Rundschau praised the work as a dark portrait of society and a true example of an underground film. Kothenschulte writes that Ahmadzadeh created a "sensational" film with Critical Zone, highlighting the director's "visionary" style and the film's "sparing, but accurately used, bittersweet score" by Milad Movahedi. Kothenschulte compares the film's protagonist to a "mythological ferryman", describing Amir as an "angel of death sailing along the banks of his own personal Hades".

Marian Wilhelm of the Austrian daily Der Standard found that the film was "absolutely more than just a statement of disobedience under difficult production conditions". Wilhelm observes that Critical Zone adopts "the car ride motif that is so typical of Iranian films" and strikes upon "impressive atmospheric images". According to Wilhelm, given the death penalty for drug offenses applies in Iran, the "surrealistic-symbolic criminal story, in turn, becomes political".

Patrick Heidmann of Stuttgarter Nachrichten assessed Critical Zone as an "impetuous, energetic, also unnerving and visually impressive film", one which "represents a new generation in Iranian cinema and shows, in a much less claustrophobic manner than others, why and for whom a radical change in Iran is overdue". Heidmann also commented that, although the film was shot before the protests that broke out in Iran in autumn 2022, all of the "conflicts, struggles and topics that are at stake there can already be found in the Locarno winner". Susanna Petrin of St. Galler Tagblatt made the same observation: Critical Zone depicted "the anger of the young generation" and it seemed to her as if Ahmadzadeh "had already foreseen the women's revolt during filming". Petrin found a scene particularly impressive in which a young woman without a hijab leans out of the window of a moving car and screams from her soul "46 years of oppression of women by the imposed culture of radical Islamic clerics".

=== Accolades ===
On 12 August 2023, Critical Zone received the Golden Leopard, the top prize of the Locarno Film Festival. The jury was chaired by the French actor Lambert Wilson. Since Ahmadzadeh was unable to travel, Ataeian Dena accepted the prize alone at the award ceremony. Michael Ranze of Frankfurter Allgemeine Zeitung viewed the Golden Leopard win as simultaneously an "artistic recognition and a sign of solidarity with the filmmakers in Iran". The film's co-producer Sina Ataeian Dena, who had earlier expressed concerns for Ahmadzadeh's safety due to the inclusion of Critical Zone at Locarno, predicted that winning the Golden Leopard could potentially protect the director: "Experience shows that the more you are in the spotlight, the safer you are in Iran".

Award	Date of ceremony	Category	Recipient(s)	Result	Ref.
Belgrade Festival of Auteur Film	1 December 2023	Aleksandar Saša Petrović Grand Prix for Best Film	Critical Zone	Won	
Film Fest Gent	21 October 2023	Grand Prix for Best Film	Critical Zone	Nominated	
Locarno Film Festival	12 August 2023	Golden Leopard	Critical Zone	Won	
Tokyo FILMeX	26 November 2023	Special Jury Prize (Shared with If Only I Could Hibernate)	Critical Zone	Won	
Valladolid International Film Festival	28 October 2023	Recoletas Award for Best Feature Film – Alquimias	Critical Zone	Nominated	
Valladolid International Film Festival	28 October 2023	Special Mention for Best Feature Film – Alquimias	Critical Zone	Won	
