= Il gattopardo =

Il gattopardo may refer to:

- The Leopard, a novel
- The Leopard (1963 film), a film based on the novel
- The Leopard (TV series), a miniseries adaptation of the novel
