= The Beautiful Summer (film) =

2023 film by Laura Luchetti

- Italian: La bella estate
- Directed by: Laura Luchetti
- Written by: Laura Luchetti; Greta Scicchitano; Mario Iannuzziello
- Produced by: Giovanni Pompili; Luca Legnani
- Starring: Yile Yara Vianello; Deva Cassel; Nicolas Maupas; Alessandro Piavani; Adrien Dewitte
- Music by: Francesco Cerasi
- Production companies: Kino Produzioni; Rai Cinema; 9.99 Films
- Distributed by: Lucky Red
- Release dates: August 2023 (Locarno); 24 August 2023 (Italy)
- Running time: 112 minutes
- Country: Italy
- Language: Italian

The Beautiful Summer (Italian: La bella estate) is a 2023 Italian drama film written by Laura Luchetti, Greta Scicchitano and Mario Iannuzziello and directed by Luchetti.

It is loosely based on a novella by Cesare Pavese, first published in Italian as La bella estate in 1940 and then in a collection of three novellas under the same name in 1949.

The film, like the novella, is set in 1930s (1938 specifically in the film) Italy and is a coming of age story of juvenile love, hope and defeat.

== Cast ==
- Yile Yara Vianello as Ginia
- Deva Cassel as Amelia
- Nicolas Maupas as Severino
- Alessandro Piavani as Guido
- Adrien Dewitte as Rodrigues
- Cosima Centurioni as Rosa
- Gabriele Graham Gasco as Massimo
- Anna Bellato as Signora Gemma
- Andrea Bosca as Dottor Andrea
- Brixhilda Shqalso as Marta
- Marilina Succo as Sarta Atelier
- Matteo Accardi as Pino
- Chiara Turetta as Tina
- Federico Calistri as Ferruccio
- Leonardo Conte as Barista
- Alicia Edyta Frydrysiak as Cliente Atelier
- Salvatore Zito as Pittore

== Release ==
The film premiered at the 76th Locarno Film Festival in 2023. Distributed by Lucky Red, the film was released theatrically in Italy on 24 August 2023.

== Reception ==
Sheri Linden of The Hollywood Reporter declared the film to be "sometimes gloriously resonant but not without missteps".
