= L'amore, in teoria =

- Directed by: Luca Lucini
- Written by: Teresa Fraioli; Amina Grenci; Gennaro Nunziante
- Starring: Nicolas Maupas; Martina Gatti; Caterina De Angelis
- Cinematography: Manfredo Archinto
- Edited by: Luca Angeleri
- Music by: Andrea Cotroneo
- Distributed by: Vision Distribution
- Release date: 24 April 2025
- Running time: 90 minutes
- Country: Italy
- Language: Italian

L'amore, in teoria is a 2025 Italian romantic comedy film directed by Luca Lucini, starring Nicolas Maupas, Martina Gatti, and Caterina De Angelis.

The film was released in Italy on 24 April 2025 by Vision Distribution.

== Cast ==
- Nicolas Maupas as Leone
- Martina Gatti as Flor
- Caterina De Angelis as Carola
- Francesco Colella as Leone's father
- Francesco Salvi as Meda
- Irma Ticozzelli as Lucia
- Gianluca Di Gennaro as Rocco
- Domenico Pinelli as Filippo
- Sara Bertelà as Pamela
- Valerio Santoro as Riccardo
- Riccardo Vicardi as Manuel
