= Hayfever (film) =

- Theatrical release poster
- Directed by: Laura Luchetti
- Written by: Laura Luchetti
- Starring: Andrea Bosca; Diane Fleri
- Cinematography: Ferran Paredes
- Edited by: Claudio Di Mauro
- Music by: Francesco Cerasi
- Production companies: DAP Italy; The Walt Disney Company Italia; Donkadillo
- Distributed by: Buena Vista International
- Release dates: 13 November 2010 (St Louis); 28 January 2011 (Italy)
- Running time: 100 minutes
- Country: Italy
- Language: Italian

Hayfever (Italian: Febbre da fieno) is a 2010 romantic comedy film written and directed by Laura Luchetti and starring Andrea Bosca, Diane Fleri and Giulia Michelini.

== Plot ==
Rome. The young Camilla is the victim of a small scooter accident. When she is loaded into the ambulance she catches sight of Matteo, who hands her the shoe that she had lost in the accident, and reads the name "Twinkled" on his bag. Once healed, Camilla goes to Twinkled, a modern antiques shop, where she is promptly hired to reorganize the spaces by the thirty-six-year-old owner Stefano, full of debt and therefore in open marital crisis. So she makes friends with her peer Franki, who dreams of Jude Law's love and writes poignant letters to him, and with Matteo, who however does not recognize her. The boy is still in love with his former flame, Giovanna, who had left him, it will be discovered later, for a German girl, Gertrud, with whom he went to live in Berlin.

Camilla, thanks to work and walks with her brother, Gigio, begins to hang out with Matteo. It seems that even on the part of the boy there is more than a sympathy but the unexpected return of Giovanna to the city upsets his feelings, and for this Camilla takes a back seat. When Giovanna confides in Matteo and tells him how he could have given her what she was looking for, Matteo begins to dream of being able to have a family with her. He will soon be disappointed. Meanwhile, Stefano, the owner of the shop, receives a notice of foreclosure, ends up at loggerheads with his wife and therefore decides to give up his dreams, preparing a total sale to settle the debts. For Franki it will be the beginning of an unexpected opportunity to be less of a dreamer and more realistic. And when everything seems to take a certain turn, the final twist will come, which will leave a little bitter taste in the mouth but will serve the characters, and the viewer, to understand some of their mistakes.

== Cast ==
- Andrea Bosca as Matteo
- Diane Fleri as Camilla
- Giulia Michelini as Franki
- Giuseppe Gandini as Stefano
- Camilla Filippi as Giovanna
- Cecilia Cinardi as Patrizia
- Mauro Ursella as Gigio
- Marco Todisco as Michelino
- Angela Goodwin as Old Lady
- Beniamino Marcone as Carlo

== See also ==
- List of Italian films of 2010
