= The Invisible Fight =

2023 film

- Estonian: Nähtamatu võitlus
- Directed by: Rainer Sarnet
- Screenplay by: Rainer Sarnet
- Produced by: Katrin Kissa
- Starring: Ursel Tilk; Ester Kuntu; Indrek Sammul; Kaarel Pogga
- Cinematography: Mart Taniel
- Edited by: Jussi Rautaniemi
- Music by: Koshiro Hino
- Production company: Homeless Bob Production
- Release date: August 11, 2023 (Locarno)
- Running time: 115 minutes
- Countries: Estonia; Latvia; Greece; Finland
- Languages: Estonian; Russian

The Invisible Fight (Estonian: Nähtamatu võitlus) is a 2023 internationally co-produced action comedy film directed by Rainer Sarnet. Set in the Estonian Soviet Socialist Republic during the 1970s, the film stars Ursel Tilk as a would-be kung fu fighter.

At the 2024 Estonian Film and Television Awards, The Invisible Fight won the most prizes of the night, with a total of nine awards including Best Film, Best Actor, Best Actress, and Best Scriptwriter.

== Premise ==
Feeling alienated by conformist Soviet society, heavy metal fan Raphael encounters an underground society of Eastern Orthodox monks who practice kung fu.

== Cast ==
- Ursel Tilk as Raphael
- Ester Kuntu as Rita
- Indrek Sammul as Nafanail
- Kaarel Pogga as Irinei
- Sepa Tom as Melhisedek
- Rain Simmul as Big Hat
- Tiina Tauraite as Marfa
- Mari Abel as Zinaida
- Maria Avdjuško as Mother
- Marika Barabanštšikova as Lady
- Rein Oja as KGB agent
- Ekke Märten Hekles as Rudolf

== Production ==
Katrin Kissa of Homeless Bob Production produced The Invisible Fight, which was co-produced with White Picture, Neda Film, and Helsinki-Filmi.

== Release ==
The Invisible Fight premiered on 11 August 2023 in the Concorso Internazionale section of the 76th Locarno Film Festival. Later that year, the film screened at Fantastic Fest and the Sitges Film Festival. The film was acquired for North American distribution by Kino Lorber.

== Reception ==
=== Critical reception ===
On the review aggregator website Rotten Tomatoes, 57% of 14 critics' reviews are positive.

=== Accolades ===
Award	Ceremony date	Category	Recipient(s)	Result	Ref.
Locarno Film Festival	12 August 2023	Golden Leopard	The Invisible Fight	Nominated	
Estonian Film and Television Awards	12 April 2024	Best Film	The Invisible Fight	Won	
Estonian Film and Television Awards	12 April 2024	Best Director	Rainer Sarnet	Nominated	
Estonian Film and Television Awards	12 April 2024	Best Scriptwriter	Rainer Sarnet	Won	
Estonian Film and Television Awards	12 April 2024	Best Actress	Ester Kuntu	Won	
Estonian Film and Television Awards	12 April 2024	Best Actor	Ursel Tilk	Won	
Estonian Film and Television Awards	12 April 2024	Best Original Music	Koshiro Hino	Won	
Estonian Film and Television Awards	12 April 2024	Best Production Design	Jaagup Roomet	Won	
Estonian Film and Television Awards	12 April 2024	Best Editing	Jussi Rautaniemi	Won	
Estonian Film and Television Awards	12 April 2024	Best Costumes	Jaanus Vahtra	Won	
Estonian Film and Television Awards	12 April 2024	Best Make-up	Anu Konze	Won	
