= The Phantom of the Opera (2026 film) =

- Directed by: Alexandre Castagnett
- Written by: Alexandre Castagnett; Camille Fontaine
- Based on: The Phantom of the Opera by Gaston Leroux
- Produced by: Thierry Desmichelle; Boris Mendza; Gaël Cabouat; Remi Jimenez; Segolene Dupont
- Starring: Romain Duris; Deva Cassel; Julien de Saint Jean; Laïka Blanc-Francard; Guillaume Diop; Dorothée Gilbert; Axel Auriant
- Cinematography: Nicolas Bolduc
- Edited by: Thibaut Damade
- Music by: Dan Levy
- Production companies: Fulldawa Films; SND Films
- Distributed by: SND Films
- Release date: October 28, 2026
- Running time: 134 minutes
- Country: France
- Language: French
- Budget: €20 million

The Phantom of the Opera (French: Le Fantôme de l'Opéra) is a 2026 romantic drama adaptation of Gaston Leroux's 1910 novel of the same name, co-written and directed by Alexandre Castagnett and starring Romain Duris, Deva Cassel and Julien de Saint Jean. The film is the first adaptation of Leroux's novel to be shot in his native France.

== Premise ==
In present-day Paris, Anastasia, a young dancer, joins the prestigious Opéra Garnier. While rehearsing Orpheus—a cursed opera said to have been composed by the Phantom of the Opera—she falls in love with a mysterious pianist. As the opening night approaches, amidst unexplained accidents and unsettling revelations, Anastasia finds herself drawn into an impossible romance that blurs the line between reality and the fantastical.

== Release ==
Initially slated to be released on 23 September 2026, The Phantom of the Opera was postponed and released in France on 28 October 2026, in both regular and IMAX formats.

== Reception ==
Vittoria Scarpa from Cineuropa described the film adaptation as "immersing viewers in a world suspended between reality and fantasy, where the theatre becomes a place of wonder, obsession and danger" with "a lively pace, well-cast actors and a skilfully orchestrated plot."
