= Dreaming & Dying =

2023 Singaporean film

- Promotional poster
- Traditional Chinese: 好久不見
- Simplified Chinese: 好久不见
- Literal meaning: "Haven't seen you for a long time"
- Hanyu Pinyin: Hǎo jiǔ bù jiàn
- Directed by: Nelson Yeo
- Screenplay by: Nelson Yeo
- Produced by: Tan Si En; Sophia Sim
- Starring: Doreen Toh; Peter Yu; Kelvin Ho
- Cinematography: Lincoln Yeo
- Edited by: Armiliah Aripin
- Production company: Momo Film
- Release date: 5 August 2023 (Locarno)
- Running time: 77 minutes
- Country: Singapore
- Languages: Mandarin; English; Singlish

Dreaming & Dying (Chinese: 好久不見) is a 2023 Singaporean experimental fantasy drama film directed by Nelson Yeo. The debut feature of Yeo, the film revolves around three middle-aged friends who are meeting for the first time in years and things take a turn when something from their past resurfaces.

The film premiered at the Locarno Film Festival in August 2023, where it won the Golden Leopard – Filmmakers of the Present and Swatch First Feature Award.

== Cast ==
- Doreen Toh
- Peter Yu
- Kelvin Ho

== Production ==
The English title Dreaming and Dying derives from a Chinese idiom zuì shēng mèng sǐ (醉生梦死), which means leading a befuddled life as if drunk or in a dream.

The film was entirely shot in Singapore.
