= We Believed =

2010 Italian drama film

Noi credevamo
- Italian Poster
- Directed by: Mario Martone
- Written by: Giancarlo De Cataldo; Mario Martone; Anna Banti (novel)
- Produced by: Carlo Degli Esposti
- Starring: Francesca Inaudi; Andrea Bosca; Edoardo Natoli; Luigi Pisani
- Cinematography: Renato Berta
- Edited by: Jacopo Quadri
- Music by: Hubert Westkemper
- Distributed by: 01 Distribution
- Release date: 7 September 2010
- Running time: 200 minutes 170 minutes (cut-edition)
- Country: Italy
- Languages: Italian, French, English, Sicilian, Polish

We Believed (Italian: Noi credevamo) is a 2010 Italian drama film directed by Mario Martone, based on a screenplay by Martone and Giancarlo De Cataldo inspired by events around the 19th-century Young Italy political movement and based on the novel of the late art historian Anna Banti. Nominated for the Golden Lion at the 67th Venice International Film Festival, the film was released in Italy on 12 November 2010.

== Plot ==
The film is divided into four chapters, titled "Le scelte" ("Choices"), "Domenico," "Angelo," and "L'alba della Nazione" ("Dawn of the Nation"). The story follows three boys growing up in the Cilento Valley in southern Italy in the early 19th century in what was then the Kingdom of the Two Sicilies. Salvatore, who is all about patriotic spirit, Domenico, who believes in friendship, and Angelo, a restless and violent man.

In 1828 all three join Young Italy, a political movement seeking unification of Italy founded by Giuseppe Mazzini. Following this decision, their lives take different paths, tracing some episodes of the historical Risorgimento period which sought to consolidate various territories on the Italian Peninsula into a single unified state.

== Cast ==
- Luigi Lo Cascio as Domenico
- Valerio Binasco as Angelo
- Francesca Inaudi as Young Cristina of Belgiojoso
- Guido Caprino as Felice Orsini
- Renato Carpentieri as Carlo Poerio
- Ivan Franěk as Simon Bernard
- Andrea Bosca as Young Angelo
- Edoardo Natoli as Young Domenico
- Luigi Pisani as Salvatore
- Stefano Cassetti as Rudio
- Michele Riondino as Saverio
- Franco Ravera as Gomez
- Andrea Renzi as Sigismondo Castromediano
- Edoardo Winspeare as Nisco
- Anna Bonaiuto as Cristina of Belgiojoso
- Toni Servillo as Giuseppe Mazzini
- Luca Zingaretti as Francesco Crispi
- Romuald Andrzej Klos as Stanislaw Worcell
- Luca Barbareschi as Antonio Gallenga
- Roberto Accornero as Luigi Melegari
