= Nicolas Maupas =

Italian-French actor (born 1998)

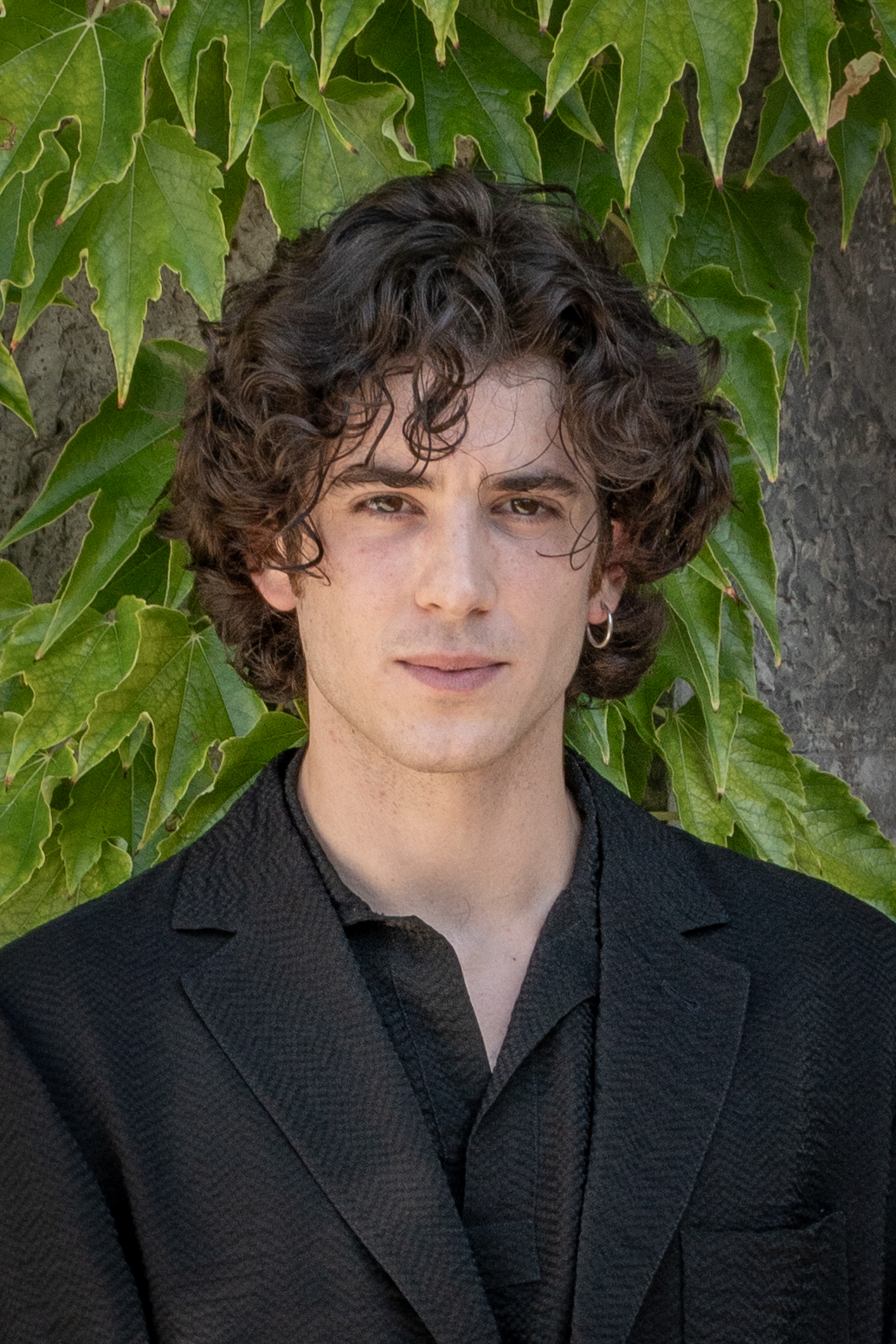
- Maupas in 2026
- Born: 29 October 1998 (age 27); Milan, Italy
- Occupation: Actor
- Years active: 2020–present

Nicolas Maupas (born 29 October 1998) is an Italian-French actor. He is best known for playing Filippo Ferrari in the Italian drama television series The Sea Beyond (2020–2023) and Simone Balestra in the teen comedy series Un professore (2021–present).

== Early life ==
Maupas was born in Milan to a French father and a Sicilian mother; his father is a graphic designer and his mother is a journalist. He grew up in Magenta and attended a liceo linguistico. He also attended Accademia 09, an acting school in Milan.

== Career ==
In 2020, he began playing Filippo Ferrari in the teen drama series The Sea Beyond, a role for which he won the Next Generation Award at the 79th Venice International Film Festival. The following year, he starred in the teen comedy series Un professore. In 2022 and 2023, he starred in the romantic comedy series I Hate Christmas and the films Under the Amalfi Sun and The Beautiful Summer. He played Albert De Morcerf in Bille August's The Count of Monte Cristo, a television adaptation of the novel of the same name by Alexandre Dumas, in 2024.

== Filmography ==
=== Film ===
Year	Title	Role	Ref.
2022	Under the Amalfi Sun	Hans	
2023	The Beautiful Summer	Severino	
2025	L'amore, in teoria	Leone	
2026	At the Revolutionary Festival	Giulio	

=== Television ===
Year	Title	Role	Notes	Ref.
2020–2023	The Sea Beyond	Filippo Ferrari	Main role (seasons 1–3)	
2021	Nudes	Vittorio	4 episodes	
2021–present	Un professore	Simone Balestra	Main role	
2022	Sopravvissuti	Roberto	11 episodes	
2022–2023	I Hate Christmas	Davide	Main role	
2023	Noi siamo leggenda	Jean	Lead role	
2024	Marconi	Young Guglielmo Marconi	2 episodes	
2025	The Count of Monte Cristo	Albert de Morcerf	Main role	

== Awards and nominations ==
Award	Year	Category	Nominated work	Result	Ref.
Ciak d'Oro Serie TV	2023	Best Audience Protagonist Under 30	The Sea Beyond	Nominated	
Ciak d'Oro Serie TV	2024	Best Audience Protagonist Under 30	Un professore; Noi siamo leggenda	Won	
Giffoni Film Festival	2022	Explosive Talent Award		Won	
Nastro d'Argento	2024	Premio Guglielmo Biraghi		Won	
Uzeta Awards	2022	Best Performance in a Television Series	Nudes	Won	
Venice International Film Festival	2022	Next Generation Award	The Sea Beyond	Won	
Best Movie Awards	2026	Best Actor	At the Revolutionary Festival	Won	
