= Indrek Sammul =

Estonian actor

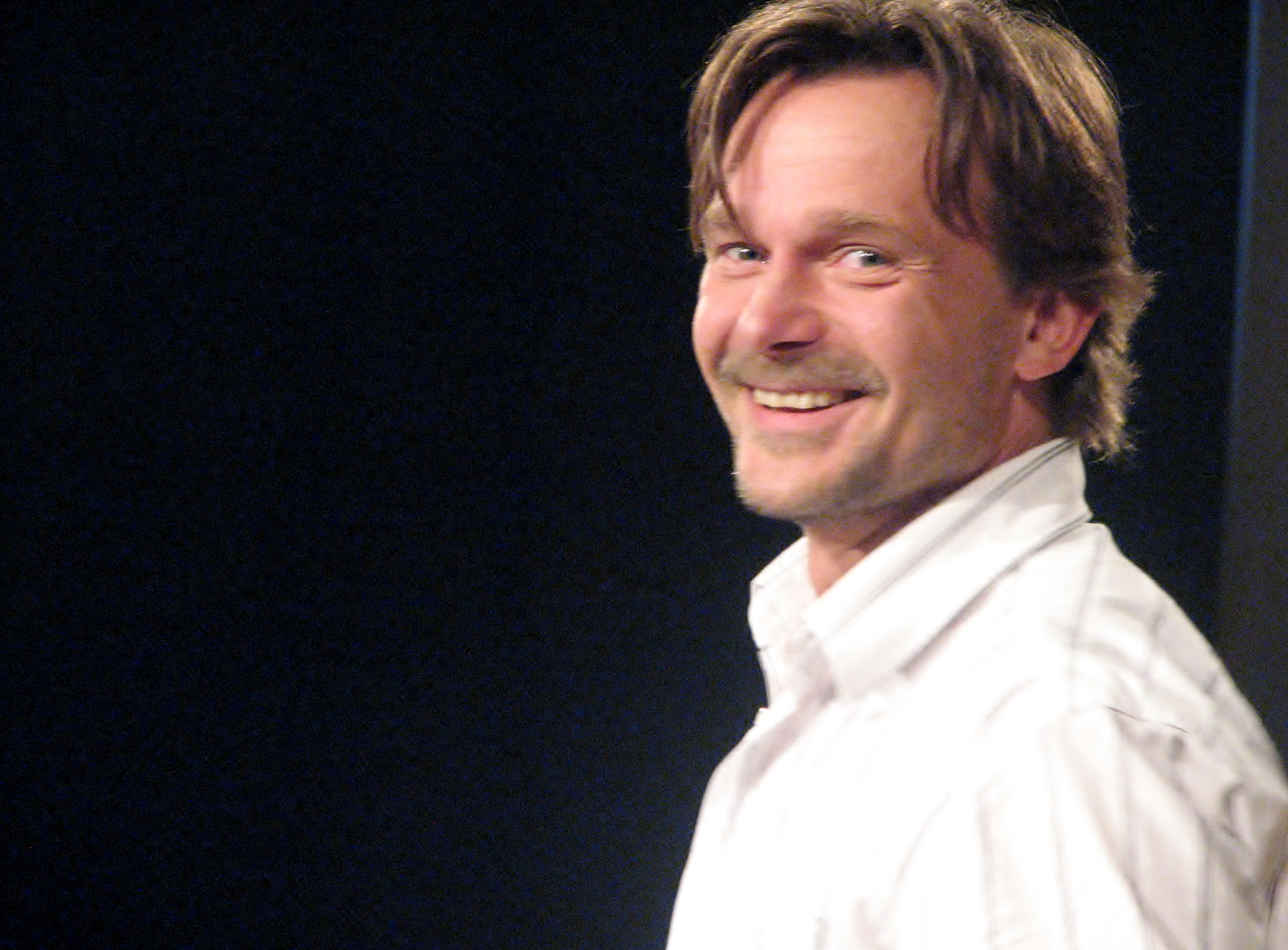
- Indrek Sammul in 2013.
- Born: Indrek Sammul; 28 January 1972 (age 54); Viljandi, then part of Estonian SSR, Soviet Union
- Occupation: Actor
- Years active: 1995–present
- Spouses: Katariina Unt (m. 1993; div. 1995) Liina Olmaru (m. 1998)
- Children: 3

Indrek Sammul (born 28 January 1972) is an Estonian actor, acting coach and stage fighting choreographer. In 1994 he graduated from the Estonian Academy of Music and Theatre, where he is a senior lecturer in State Speech. Sammul has worked as an actor in Tallinn City Theatre and Ugala Theatre. His first television role was in 1995 when he played in a drama series Wikman Boys.

== Personal life ==
Sammul was married to actress Katariina Unt from 1993 until their divorce in 1995. Since 1998, Sammul has been married to Estonian actress Liina Olmaru. The couple have three adopted children, two sons and a daughter.

== Filmography ==
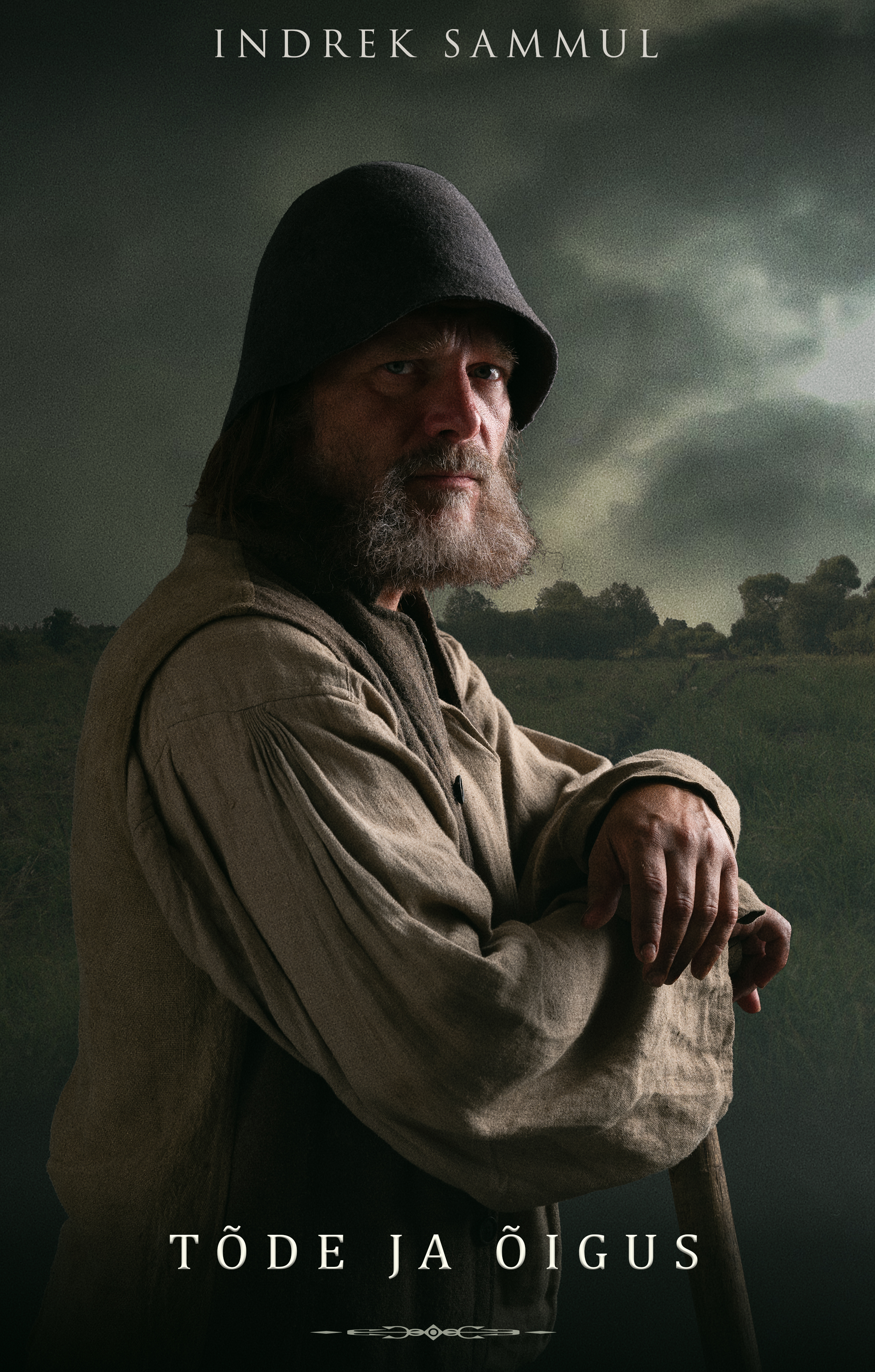
Sammul as the character Madis in a promotional poster for the film Tõde ja õigus (2029)

Films

Year	Film	Role	Film gross	Notes
2002	Nimed marmortahvlil	Ants Ahas	19 million EEK	English title: Names in Marble
2016	Polaarpoiss	Hardi		English title: The Polar Boy
2019	Tõde ja õigus	Sauna-Madis		English title: Truth and Justice. Film adaptation of A. H. Tammsaare's 1926–1933 pentalogy of the same name
2022	Kalev	Stranger		
2023	Nähtamatu võitlus	Nafanail		English title: The Invisible Fight
2024	Vari	Publisher		English title: The Shadow

Television

Year	Title	Role	Notes
1995	Wikmani poisid	Richard Laasik	
2003	Pehmed ja karvased	Voice	
2007	Ohtlik lend	Kaarel Oba	
2008	Brigaad 3	Mikk	
2010	Kättemaksukontor	Pearu Jalakas	
2010	Klass: Elu pärast	Father of Thea	
