= Zero A. D.: The Birth of Christ =

2026 film by Alejandro Gómez Monteverde

- Theatrical release poster
- Directed by: Alejandro Gómez Monteverde
- Written by: Rod Barr
- Based on: The Gospel of Matthew
- Produced by: Leo Severino; Eduardo Verástegui
- Starring: Deva Cassel; Sam Worthington; Ben Mendelsohn; Gael García Bernal; Jim Caviezel
- Cinematography: Gorka Gómez Andreu
- Music by: John Debney
- Production companies: Kasbah Films; 2521 Entertainment; Metanoia Films
- Distributed by: Angel Studios
- Release date: December 11, 2026
- Running time: 115 minutes
- Country: United States
- Language: English

Zero A. D.: The Birth of Christ is an upcoming American epic biblical drama film set during the Massacre of the Innocents as told in the Gospel of Matthew from the Bible. Directed by Alejandro Gómez Monteverde, it stars Deva Cassel, Sam Worthington, Ben Mendelsohn, Gael García Bernal, and Jim Caviezel.

Zero A. D.: The Birth of Christ is scheduled to be released in the United States on December 11, 2026.

== Premise ==
A young Joseph and Mary protect her child Jesus from a murderous King Herod.

== Cast ==
- Deva Cassel as Mary
  - Sophie Sloan as Young Mary
- Sam Worthington as Antipater, Herod's son
- Ben Mendelsohn as Nahash
- Gael García Bernal as Joachim
- Jim Caviezel as King Herod
- Jamie Ward as Joseph
- David Harewood

== Production ==
The film, originally titled Bethlehem and described as a "spiritual thriller" revolving around the Massacre of the Innocents, was announced in November 2024, with Alejandro Gómez Monteverde set to direct for Angel Studios, marking their third collaboration. The cast includes Jim Caviezel as King Herod, Sam Worthington as Herod's son Antipater, Ben Mendelsohn as Nahash, Gael García Bernal as Joachim, and Deva Cassel as Mary.

Principal photography took place in Morocco in November 2024.

== Release ==
The film was retitled Zero A.D. and was originally scheduled to be released by Angel Studios in the United States on December 19, 2025, but after Angel acquired the rights to David, they released David in that slot and moved Zero A.D. to December 25, 2026. It is now scheduled to be released in the United States by Angel on December 11, 2026.
