= AnneFrank. Parallel Stories =

2019 Italian documentary film

#AnneFrank. Parallel Stories
- Directed by: Sabina Fedeli; Anna Migotto
- Written by: Sabina Fedeli; Anna Migotto
- Produced by: Franco Di Sarro; Didi Gnocchi; 3D Produzioni; Nexo Digital; Anne Frank Fonds; Rai Cinema
- Starring: Helen Mirren; Arianna Szorenyi; Fanny Hochbaum; Sarah Lichtsztejn-Montard; Andra Bucci; Helga Weiss; Martina Gatti
- Narrated by: Helen Mirren
- Cinematography: Alessio Viola
- Edited by: Valentina Ghilotti
- Music by: Lele Marchitelli
- Distributed by: Nexo Digital
- Release date: 17 October 2019; (Australia)
- Running time: 92 minutes
- Country: Italy
- Language: English

#AnneFrank. Parallel Stories is a 2019 English-language Italian feature-length docufiction film, directed by Sabina Fedeli and Anna Migotto and narrated by Helen Mirren. In American theaters it premiered on January 22, 2020 on a limited release, while on Netflix it premiered on July 2, 2020.

Critics consider the film to be a moving documentary about the Holocaust that would help young viewers connect to a valuable past. The Guardian described the film as targeted at young people through an educational stance. Critics have also read the hashtagging of key phrases (in contemporary social media fashion) by the young character in the fiction part of the film as the clear inspiration for the film's title.

== Content ==
The film opens with a young Ugg boots-wearing/nose-ringed European girl (Martina Gatti), whom we later know by the name #KaterinaKat, scanning a secluded tree-surrounded spot that is soon revealed as the location of a former concentration camp, the Bergen-Belsen camp. She is also revealed as a young Anne Frank fan in present time, curious about the young Anne, who has been travelling by rail to various historical sites in Europe before ending her journey in Frank's reconstructed hiding room in Amsterdam. Throughout her journey, #KaterinaKat posts her thoughts and pictures on Instagram, hashtagging key phrases.

Meanwhile, from Frank's reconstructed Amsterdam hiding room, Academy Award-winning actress Helen Mirren introduces Frank's story through words from Frank's diary. Intermittently through the film's progress, there are also parallel stories from five surviving children of the Holocaust who appear in the film along with their grandchildren. The five survivors interviewed are Arianna Szörenyi, Sarah Lichtsztejn-Montard, Helga Weiss and sisters Andra and Tatiana Bucci. Frank would have been 90 years old at the film's 2019 release, and her story is intertwined in the film with narratives from these five Holocaust survivors who were more or less Frank's age during World War II. These survivors' testimonies, which create parallels between their past and Frank's, alternate with those from their children and grandchildren, creating parallels between the past and the present.

== Cast ==
- Helen Mirren
- Arianna Szorenyi
- Fanny Hochbaum
- Sarah Lichtsztejn-Montard
- Andra Bucci
- Helga Weiss
- Martina Gatti as #KaterinaKat

== Production ==
Anne Frank's hiding room in Amsterdam was reconstructed to the detail by set designers from the Piccolo Theatre in Milan.

== Style ==
The documentary was made in the docufiction style.

== Release ==
The film was released in Australia on 17 October 2019, in Italy on 11 November 2019, in the United States on 22 January 2020, and on Netflix on 2 July 2020.

== Reception ==
=== Box office ===
The film peaked at #16 on the Australian box office in the week ending 20 October 2019.

=== Critical reception ===
The film was received positively by critics. On the review aggregation website Rotten Tomatoes, the film holds an 89% approval rating based on 9 reviews. Roger Moore of Movie Nation said that the film's story is "a hard story to screw up, and appreciating its simple authority, how quickly this one breezes by and how moving it is in the end, they didn't." Peter Bradshaw, writing for The Guardian, called the film a "heartfelt and valuable documentary." Renuka Vyavahare reviewed the film for The Times of India, celebrating how the "documentary reminds us how integral freedom is for our survival and existence." Writing for mint lounge, Somak Ghoshal criticized the film for turning "the victim of a horrific historical tragedy into a hashtag."
