= Animal (2023 Greek film) =

2023 film directed by Sofia Exarchou

- Theatrical release poster
- Directed by: Sofia Exarchou
- Written by: Sofia Exarchou
- Produced by: Maria Drandaki; Maria Kontogianni
- Starring: Dimitra Vlagopoulou; Voodoo Jürgens; Flomaria Papadaki; Ahilleas Hariskos
- Cinematography: Monika Lenczewska
- Edited by: Dragos Apetri
- Music by: Wolfgang Frisch
- Production companies: Homemade Films; Nabis Filmgroup; Digital Cube; Felony; Ars OOD; ERT S.A.
- Distributed by: Weird Wave
- Release dates: 3 August 2023 (Locarno); 8 February 2024 (Greece)
- Running time: 116 minutes
- Countries: Greece; Austria; Romania; Cyprus; Bulgaria
- Languages: Greek; English; German

Animal is a 2023 drama film written and directed by Sofia Exarchou. The film premiered on 3 August 2023 at the 76th Locarno Film Festival, where it competed for the Golden Leopard.

== Plot ==
The entertainers on an all-inclusive Greek island are preparing for high season. It is the responsibility of Kalia, the leader of the group, to keep the program running. The characters must confront new challenges as the work becomes increasingly demanding. As the events take a turn for the worse, Kalia learns that the show must go on.

== Cast ==
- Dimitra Vlagopoulou as Kalia
- Voodoo Jürgens as Jonas
- Flomaria Papadaki as Eva
- Ahilleas Hariskos as Simos
- Chronis Barbarian as Thomas
- Ilias Hatzigeorgiou as Vladimir
- Danai Petropoulea as Mary
- Elpida Orfanidou as Fani
- Joanna Toumpakari as Jo
- Fay Tzouma as Sonia
- Nontas Damopoulos as Dimos
- Kristof as Sergey
- Vagelis Evangelinos as Argyris

== Production ==
Animal is a production of the Athens-based company Homemade Films, with co-production handled by Nabis Filmgroup (Austria), Digital Cube (Romania), Felony (Cyprus), Ars OOD (Bulgaria) and ERT S.A. (Greece).

The film music was composed by the Austrian Wolfgang Frisch. The soundtrack album with a total of 17 pieces of music was released as a download by the Plaza Mayor Company in mid-January 2024.

== Release ==
The film premiered on 3 August 2023 at the 76th Locarno Film Festival, where Animal competed for the Golden Leopard. In October 2023, the film was shown at the Vienna International Film Festival. From mid-November 2023 it was presented at the International Filmfestival Mannheim-Heidelberg. Weird Wave theatrically released the film in Greece from 8 February 2024. Filmgarten distributed the film in Austria beginning on 26 March 2024 in Innsbruck before expanding nationwide on 29 March 2024.

== Awards ==
Animal was shortlisted for the 2023 European Film Awards. Below are further nominations and awards.

Cork International Film Festival 2023

- Awarded the Spirit of the Festival Award

Gothenburg Film Festival 2024

- Nomination in the international competition

International Filmfestival Mannheim-Heidelberg 2023

- Awarded the FIPRESCI Prize
- Nomination in the international competition "On the Rise"

Thessaloniki International Film Festival 2023

- Awarded the Golden Alexander in the International Competition
- Best Actress Award ( Dimitra Vlagopoulou )
- Awarded the Crew United Award (Sofia Exarchou)

Les Arcs Film Festival 2023

- Crystal Arrow nomination in the main competition
- Awarded the Prix d'interprétation (Dimitra Vlagopoulou)

Locarno Film Festival 2023

- Golden Leopard nomination ( Sofia Exarchou )
- Award for Best Actress (Dimitra Vlagopoulou)

São Paulo International Film Festival 2023

- Nomination in the New Directors Competition (Sofia Exarchou)

68th Valladolid International Film Festival 2023

- Honorable mention in the Meeting Point Section

Vancouver International Film Festival 2023

- Awarded the Vanguard Award
