= Diane Fleri =

French-born Italian actress

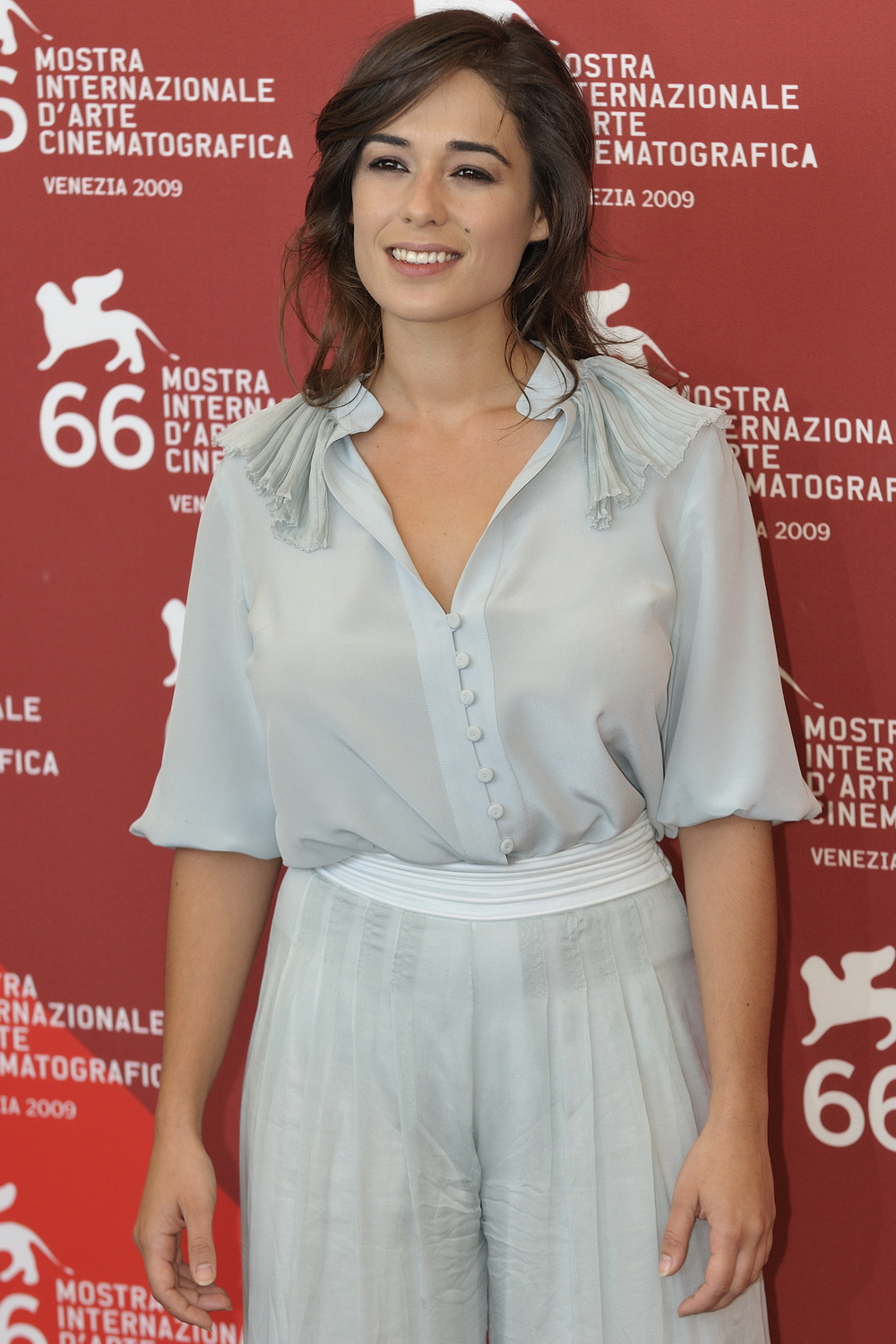
- Fleri at the 2009 Venice Film Festival
- Born: 13 July 1983 (age 42); Quimper, France
- Occupation: Actress

Diane Fleri (born 13 July 1983) is a French-born Italian actress.

== Early life ==
Fleri was born in Quimper, Brittany, France, to an Italian father, Marino Fleri, a diplomat of Estonian and Maltese origins, and a French mother of Vietnamese origin. She subsequently lived for eight years in Jerusalem, Israel, until the outbreak of the Gulf War; At the age of 9 Fleri moved to Rome. She has two brothers and a sister.

== Career ==
Fleri's career began by chance when, still a teenager, she accompanied a friend to an audition for the film Come te nessuno mai by Gabriele Muccino; she was eventually chosen by the director for the role of Arianna. After her film debut, Fleri continued her studies, enrolling in the department of political science, and in the meantime she went to live for a year in Paris, where she studied acting and debuted on stage.

After having appeared in several television dramas and short films, she had her breakout role in 2007, playing Francesca in Daniele Luchetti's My Brother Is an Only Child.

== Filmography ==
=== Films ===
| Year | Title | Role(s) | Notes |
|---|---|---|---|
| 1999 | But Forever in My Mind | Arianna | |
| 2005 | Achille e la tartaruga | Fiamma | Short film |
| 2007 | My Brother Is an Only Child | Francesca | |
| 2008 | Solo un padre | Camille | |
| 2008 | Quell'estate | Eleonora | |
| 2008 | François | Lila | Short film |
| 2008 | Il prossimo tuo | Caroline | |
| 2009 | I Am Love | Eva | |
| 2010 | Hayfever | Camilla | |
| 2011 | L'amore fa male | Antonia | |
| 2011 | It May Be Love But It Doesn't Show | Sonia | |
| 2011 | Ghost Track | Sophie | |
| 2012 | A Flat for Three | Claire | |
| 2012 | Nina | Nina | |
| 2018 | Looped Love | Rachel | Short film |
| 2022 | The Boat | Elena | |
| 2022 | Questa notte parlami dell'Africa | Fè | |
| 2023 | Romantic Girls | Susanna Celano | |

=== Television ===
| Year | Title | Role(s) | Notes |
|---|---|---|---|
| 2006 | R.I.S.: Delitti imperfetti | Susanna Reggiani | Episode: "Ossessione" |
| 2008–2009 | I liceali | Melanie Desmoulis | Main role (season 1–2) |
| 2010 | Gli ultimi del paradiso | Sara | Television film |
| 2014 | Questo nostro amore | Emanuela | 6 episodes |
| 2016–2018 | Solo | Barbara Migliardi | Main role |
| 2018 | Liberi sognatori | Alice Grassi | Episode: "A testa alta: Libero Grassi" |
| 2023 | Rocco Schiavone | Isabelle Baldaccini | Episode: "Il viaggio continua" |
