= List of 2019 box office number-one films in Australia =

This is a list of films which have placed number one at the box office in Australia during 2019. All amounts are in Australian dollars and from Box Office Mojo.

== Number-one films ==
†	This implies the highest-grossing movie of the year.

#	Weekend end date	Film	Weekend gross	Top 20 openings
1	6 January 2019	How to Train Your Dragon: The Hidden World	$6,738,805	Mary Poppins Returns (#3)
2	13 January 2019	Aquaman	$3,533,858	Instant Family (#3), Petta (#11), Uri: The Surgical Strike (#15), Viswasam (#17), Pick of the Litter (#20)
3	20 January 2019	Glass	$3,369,973	Mary Queen of Scots (#6), Storm Boy (#7), The Kid Who Would Be King (#10), F2 – Fun and Frustration (#17)
4	27 January 2019	The Mule	$1,904,222	Dragon Ball Super: Broly (#7), BTS World Tour: Love Yourself in Seoul (#14), Manikarnika: The Queen of Jhansi (#20)
5	3 February 2019	The Mule	$1,726,372	Ben Is Back (#9), Ek Ladki Ko Dekha Toh Aisa Laga (#19)
6	10 February 2019	Escape Room	$1,320,743	Cold Pursuit (#4), Extreme Job (#18)
7	17 February 2019	Alita: Battle Angel	$3,783,008	What Men Want (#2), Happy Death Day 2U (#6), Gully Boy (#9), Kala Shah Kala (#18), If Beale Street Could Talk (#20)
8	24 February 2019	Alita: Battle Angel	$2,315,184	Stan & Ollie (#4), Total Dhamaal (#8)
9	3 March 2019	Alita: Battle Angel	$1,467,682	A Dog's Way Home (#2), Greta (#6), Ploey: You Never Fly Alone (#18), Luka Chuppi (#19)
10	10 March 2019	Captain Marvel	$13,595,083	Badla (#11), Guddiyan Patole (#13), Everybody Knows (#15), Met Opera: La Traviata (#20)
11	17 March 2019	Captain Marvel	$7,371,106	Hotel Mumbai (#2), More than Blue (#11), Chaal Jeevi Laiye! (#16), Band Vaaje (Kudiye Lahore Diye) (#19)
12	24 March 2019	Captain Marvel	$3,881,160	The Lego Movie 2: The Second Part (#2), Fighting with My Family (#3), Kesari (#7), Destroyer (#8), Joni 75: A Birthday Celebration (#17), Water Lilies of Monet: The Magic of Water and Light (#18)
13	31 March 2019	Us	$3,851,856	Dumbo (#2), Five Feet Apart (#4), Rabb Da Radio 2 (#11), Lucifer (#15), Fate/stay night: Heaven's Feel II. lost butterfly (#17), Lakshmi's NTR (#20)
14	7 April 2019	Shazam!	$4,457,659	Pet Sematary (#6), Majili (#11), Woman at War (#15), The Happy Prince (#16), P Storm (#18), Romeo Akbar Walter (#19)
15	14 April 2019	Shazam!	$3,290,966	Wonder Park (#4), Hellboy (#8), Little (#9), The Aftermath (#11), Missing Link (#12), Manje Bistre 2 (#13)
16	21 April 2019	Shazam!	$2,520,468	The Curse of La Llorona (#5), Jersey (#15), Burning (#16)
17	28 April 2019	Avengers: Endgame †	$34,116,525	The Chaperone (#8), Gloria Bell (#12), The Hummingbird Project (#20)
18	5 May 2019	Avengers: Endgame †	$13,626,035	Top End Wedding (#2), Long Shot (#3), Peppa Pig: Festival of Fun (#4), Blackia (#17), Dil Diyaan Gallan (#18)
19	12 May 2019	Avengers: Endgame †	$5,479,149	Detective Pikachu (#2), The Hustle (#3), Poms (#5), Maharshi (#7), Student of the Year 2 (#9), All Is True (#10), Always Miss You (#20)
20	19 May 2019	John Wick: Chapter 3 – Parabellum	$4,148,333	De De Pyaar De (#8), The Least of These: The Graham Staines Story (#9), Code Geass: Lelouch of the Re;surrection (#13), Mr. Local (#16)
21	26 May 2019	Aladdin	$7,592,424	Brightburn (#5), 2040 (#9), Muklawa (#10), The Heiresses (#12), Chandigarh Amritsar Chandigarh (#13), All About Eve (#14), Mayday Life (#17)
22	2 June 2019	Aladdin	$5,746,853	Rocketman (#2), Godzilla: King of the Monsters (#3), NGK (#11), Met Opera: La Fille du Régiment (#16)
23	9 June 2019	Aladdin	$4,743,324	Dark Phoenix (#3), Laiye Je Yaarian (#11), My Big Gay Italian Wedding (#15), Exhibition on Screen: Degas Passion for Perfection (#16), The Gangster, The Cop, The Devil (#18), My Best Summer (#19)
24	16 June 2019	Men in Black: International	$3,887,817	Tolkien (#10), Wild Rose (#11), National Theatre Live: All My Sons (#15), Chasing the Dragon II: Wild Wild Bunch (#17), Is It Wrong to Try to Pick Up Girls in a Dungeon?: Arrow of the Orion (#20)
25	23 June 2019	Toy Story 4	$8,030,294	The Secret Life of Pets 2 (#2), Child's Play (#6), Kabir Singh (#10), Shadaa (#11), Never Look Away (#14), Claire Darling (#20)
26	30 June 2019	Toy Story 4	$6,402,508	Yesterday (#2), Annabelle Comes Home (#3), Parasite (#10), Article 15 (#18)
27	7 July 2019	Spider-Man: Far From Home	$10,438,089	After (#7), Mystify: Michael Hutchence (#10), An Unexpected Love (#16), Oh! Baby (#19)
28	14 July 2019	Spider-Man: Far From Home	$6,549,264	Crawl (#7), Stuber (#8), Booksmart (#9), Super 30 (#14), The White Storm 2 - Drug Lords (#16)
29	21 July 2019	The Lion King	$20,601,579	Apollo 11 (#6), Ardaas Karaan (#9), The White Crow (#11)
30	28 July 2019	The Lion King	$11,254,649	André Rieu's 2019 Maastricht Concert - Shall We Dance? (#3), Chal Mera Putt (#6), The Keeper (#8), Dear Comrade (#15), Diego Maradona (#17)
31	4 August 2019	Hobbs & Shaw	$7,239,134	Who You Think I Am (#9), The Bravest (#15), Camino Skies (#17), The Public (#19)
32	11 August 2019	The Lion King	$2,826,543	Palm Beach (#3), Late Night (#5), Bring the Soul: The Movie (#7), Midsommar (#10), Hello, Love, Goodbye (#11), Nerkonda Paarvai (#13)
33	18 August 2019	Once Upon a Time in Hollywood	$6,671,784	A Dog's Journey (#5), Mission Mangal (#8), Line Walker 2: Invisible Spy (#11), Batla House (#14), Evaru (#18)
34	25 August 2019	Once Upon a Time in Hollywood	$3,742,969	Angel Has Fallen (#2), Ne Zha (#5), Weathering with You (#6), Overcomer (#10), The Australian Dream (#12)
35	1 September 2019	Once Upon a Time in Hollywood	$2,649,403	The Kitchen (#7), Amazing Grace (#12), The Lehman Trilogy: National Theatre Live 2019 (#18), Exit (#19), Dogman (#20)
36	8 September 2019	It Chapter Two	$5,904,601	The Farewell (#6), Saaho (#13), Chhichhore (#15), Little Women (#18), Take Home Pay (#20)
37	15 September 2019	Downton Abbey	$3,218,839	The Angry Birds Movie 2 (#3), Dream Girl (#8), Gang Leader (#10)
38	22 September 2019	Downton Abbey	$2,256,068	Ad Astra (#2), Good Boys (#4), Rambo: Last Blood (#5), Abominable (#7), Dora and the Lost City of Gold (#8), Nikka Zaildar 3 (#10), Kaappaan (#15), Margaret Atwood: Live in Cinemas (#16), The Game Changers (#17)
39	29 September 2019	Ride Like a Girl	$1,664,809	Scary Stories to Tell in the Dark (#8), UglyDolls (#12), The Goldfinch (#14), Namma Veettu Pillai (#17), The Dead Don't Die (#19), Exhibition on Screen: Rembrandt (#20)
40	6 October 2019	Joker	$9,746,924	War (#8), My People, My Country (#10), PAW Patrol: Ready Race Rescue (#11), The Captain (#14), Sye Raa Narasimha Reddy (#17), Roger Waters Us + Them (#20)
41	13 October 2019	Joker	$7,439,024	Hustlers (#2), Gemini Man (#3), Fleabag: NT Live 2019 (#12), Metallica & San Francisco Symphony: S&M2 (#15), The Climbers (#20)
42	20 October 2019	Joker	$4,354,011	Maleficent: Mistress of Evil (#2), Zombieland: Double Tap (#3), Judy (#7), Billy Connolly: The Sex Life of Bandages (#13), #AnneFrank. Parallel Stories (#16), Ardab Mutiyaran (#19)
43	27 October 2019	Joker		Bigil (#7), Housefull 4 (#9), Blinded by the Light (#11), Pavarotti (#14), Friends 25th: The One with the Anniversary (#15), After the Wedding (#16), Cats (#18), Promare (#20)
44	3 November 2019	Terminator: Dark Fate		47 Meters Down: Uncaged (#8), DanTDM Presents The Contest (#13), Kaithi (#17), Ballon (#20)
45	10 November 2019	Last Christmas		Doctor Sleep (#4), Bala (#11), Arctic Dogs (#12), Pain and Glory (#14)
46	17 November 2019	Ford v Ferrari		Charlie's Angels (#2), INXS: Baby Live at Wembley Stadium (#9), One Piece: Stampede (#15)
47	24 November 2019	Ford v Ferrari		21 Bridges (#4), Fisherman's Friends (#6), Official Secrets (#9), Countdown (#11), Spirits in the Forest (#17), Pagalpanti (#19)
48	1 December 2019	Frozen 2		Knives Out (#2), Two Tigers (#11), Mrs Lowry & Son (#15), Ermitage. Il potere dell'arte (#16), Commando 3 (#19)
49	8 December 2019	Frozen 2		The Good Liar (#5), Pati Patni Aur Woh (#10), Panipat (#12), Western Stars (#13), Hellaro (#16), Violet Evergarden: Eternity and the Auto Memory Doll (#17), National Theatre Live: Hansard (#18)
50	15 December 2019	Frozen 2		Playing with Fire (#4), Black Christmas (#8), Playmobil: The Movie (#9), The Queen's Corgi (#10), Venky Mama (#14), Mardaani 2 (#15), Mamangam (#18)
51	22 December 2019	Star Wars: The Rise of Skywalker		Dabangg 3 (#6), Ip Man 4: The Finale (#8), Prati Roju Pandage (#14), Thambi (#18), Hero (#19)
52	29 December 2019	Jumanji: The Next Level		Cats (#4), Jojo Rabbit (#5), Good Newwz (#7), The Truth (#12), Portrait of a Lady on Fire (#15), Sorry We Missed You (#17)

== Highest-grossing films ==
Highest-grossing films of 2019
Rank	Title	Distributor	Domestic gross
1	Avengers: Endgame	Disney	$51,870,287
2	The Lion King	Disney	$41,318,431
3	Toy Story 4	Disney	$28,682,613
4	Captain Marvel	Disney	$28,407,793
5	Joker	Warner Bros.	$28,287,249
6	Aladdin	Disney	$24,182,100
7	Frozen 2	Disney	$21,426,799
8	Star Wars: The Rise of Skywalker	Disney	$21,310,150
9	Spider-Man: Far From Home	Sony	$21,134,067
10	Aquaman	Warner Bros.	$18,471,178

== See also ==
- List of Australian films – Australian films by year
- 2019 in film
