= Andrea Bosca =

Italian actor (born 1980)

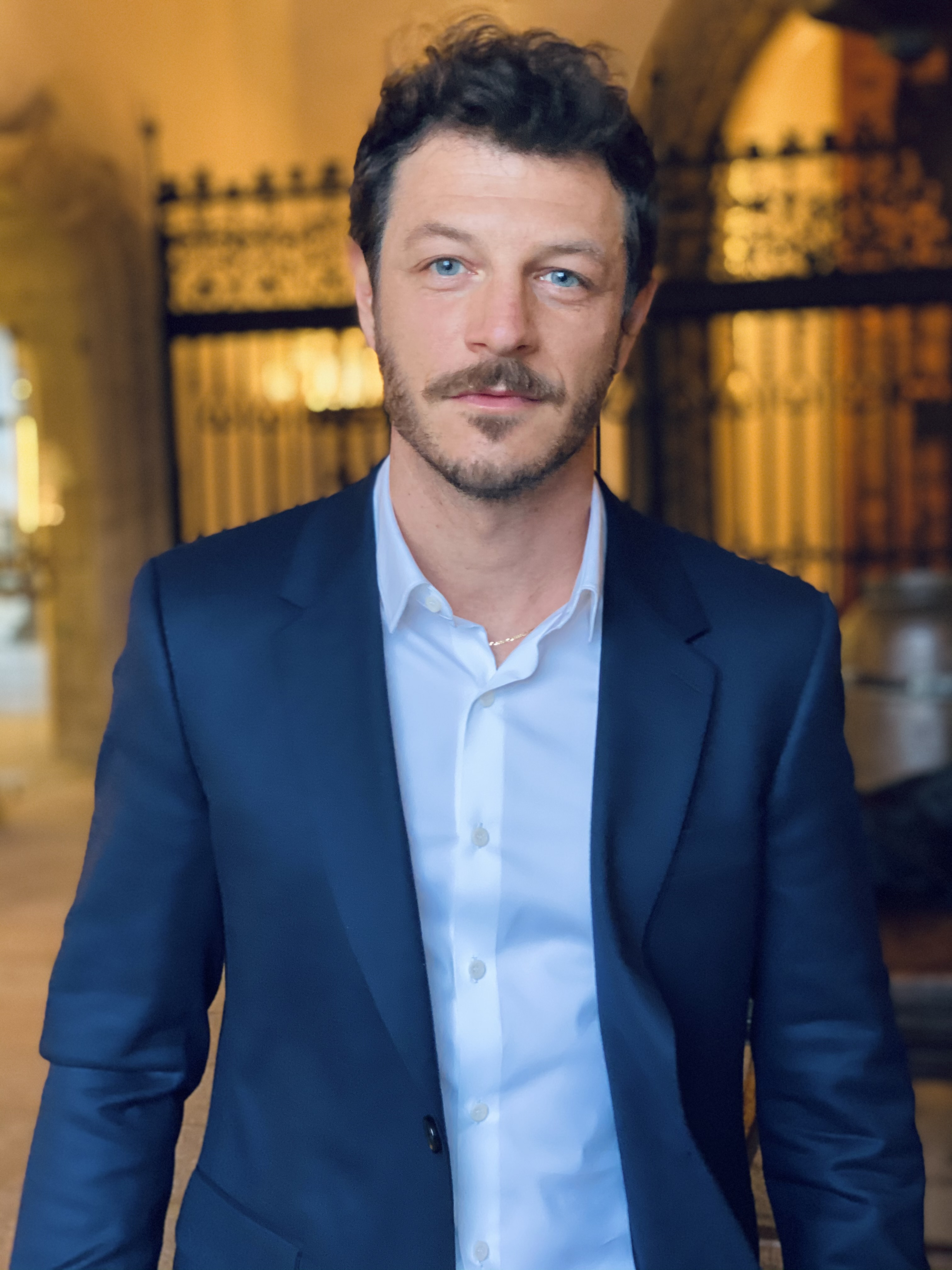
- Born: 14 July 1980 (age 45); Canelli, Italy
- Occupation: Actor
- Years active: 2004-present

Andrea Bosca (born 14 July 1980) is an Italian actor. He appeared in more than thirty films since 2004.

== Life and career ==
Andrea Bosca graduated in 2003 from the Teatro Stabile School of Turin, founded by director Luca Ronconi.

In 2004 he became part of the Teatro Stabile of Turin Company. Since 2005, he has also appeared in several Italian and international projects, working in movies, television series and theatrical productions, switching languages and physicality, developing diverse, challenging and realistic characters. He speaks Italian, English, Spanish and French.

He appeared in numerous movies, including We Can Do That directed by Giulio Manfredonia, We Believed by Mario Martone (Nastro d'Argento 2011), Hay Fever by Laura Luchetti, Drifters by Matteo Rovere (for which Bosca won the Guglielmo Biraghi Award in 2012) and Magnificent Presence by Ferzan Özpetek.

He starred in the international TV Series Medici: Master of Florence, and the ABC series Quantico along with actress Priyanka Chopra.

He lately worked in several popular Italian TV series including La porta rossa (The Red Door), Made in Italy (The Series), Romanzo Famigliare by Francesca Archibugi.

He is currently starring in the Amazon Exclusive production 3 Caminos set in the Camino de Santiago (The Way of St. James), available for streaming since January 2021 in more than 20 countries.

He is the writer and the protagonist of the monologue La luna e i falò (The Moon and the Bonfires), an adaptation from the book by Italian author Cesare Pavese, currently on a national tour throughout Italy.

== Selected filmography ==
Year	Title	Role	Notes
2004	Saint John Bosco: Mission to Love	Enrico Zarello	
2008	Love, Soccer and Other Catastrophes	Adam	
2008	We Can Do That	Gigio	
2010	We Believed	Young Angelo	
2010	Hayfever	Matteo	
2011	Drifters	Méte	
2012	Magnificent Presence	Luca Veroli	
2016	Best Enemies Forever	Ruggero	
2018	Quantico	Andrea	
2021	3 Caminos	Luca	
