= Sina Ataeian Dena =

Iranian film director, screenwriter and film producer

Sina Ataeian Dena (born 1983 in Ahvaz, Iran) is an Iranian-German film director, screenwriter and film producer and artist.

== Filmmaker ==
Sina Ataeian Dena studied film directing at the Sooreh University of Art in Tehran. In 2009 his animated short film "Especially Music" won the international competition of the Tehran International Short Film Festival. Sina Ataeian Dena then realized his first full-length feature film Paradise (original title: Ma dar behesht). He was responsible for writing, directing, and producing the film with his production partner Yousef Panahi. The shoot took three years to complete, as the film did not receive official filming permission or governmental funding in Iran. Paradise, a drama about subliminal violence, centers around the life of a young woman in modern day Tehran who works as a teacher in a girls' school in the suburbs. Paradise had its World Premiere in 2015 in the main competition of the 68th Locarno Film Festival. It was nominated for the Golden Leopard and was awarded the Prize of the Ecumenical Jury and the Swatch Art Peace Hotel Award. Subsequently, Paradise was shown at numerous international film festivals and won further nominations and awards. At the 15th Marrakech International Film Festival jury president Francis Ford Coppola gave Sina Ataeian Dena the Special Jury Award for Paradise.

In 2018, Snoeck Publishing published Paradise Handbook, which outlines the subversive strategies used in the film to circumvent the restrictions of the repressive regime.

In 2023, Dena was the producer and dramaturgical advisor of the Iranian social drama Critical Zone directed by Ali Ahmadzadeh. Both were awarded with the Golden Leopard for the best film at the Locarno Film Festival. Ataeian had to accept the award alone, as Ahmadzadeh had been prevented from entering the Schengen area. In his speech, Ataeian Dena spoke about the central role that artists play in repressive systems and called for solidarity and freedom of expression. The speech was widely received. The film won further awards, e.g. at the Haifa International Film Festival and the Batumi International Art-House Film Festival.

Ataeian Dena was the associate producer and dramaturgical advisor of Steffi Niederzoll's documentary Seven Winters in Tehran about the life of Reyhaneh Jabbari and her fight for women's rights. The film won numerous awards, including the Compass Perspective Award and the Peace Film Award at the Berlinale 2023, the F:act Award at its international premiere at the CPH:DOX and the Bavarian Film Award 2024.

Together with Kia Ataiean Dena, he is co-author for Henner Winckler´s new film Science of happiness. His latest work Wolves as screenwriter and director is the first animated series project of the Berlinale Co-Production Market. He is co-founder of the film production company counterintuitive film.

He teaches at the Deutsche Film- und Fernsehakademie (DFFB, German Film and Television Academy) and the Berlin University of the Arts (UdK). He offers seminars on creative writing, directing, dramaturgy and performance as well as computer-generated animation techniques.

== Artist ==
In 2018, Ataeian Dena exhibited photographies and the video installation "Altering Realities" in the exhibition "Hidden Secret" alongside works by the artists Francis Alys and !Mediengruppe Bitnik in the contemporary art gallery Villa Merkel, Germany. The video installation "Home" was presented by Ataeian Dena in 2018 as part of the showcase "Studio Bosporus" at the Museum for the Present Hamburger Bahnhof, Berlin.

In 2016, 2017 and 2018, Sina Ataeian Dena received scholarships from the Goethe-Institut for the artist residency Kulturakademie Tarabya in Istanbul. In 2018/2019 he was a fellow at the Swatch Art Peace Hotel artist residency in Shanghai. He now lives in Berlin.

He is co-founder of the public performance collective Exhilium, which was founded in 2020 and was represented at the Karneval der Kulturen, Berlin, in 2023, among others.

His provocative artworks about the environmental disasters in his hometown of Ahvaz and other places around the globe have attracted attention. His video art, paintings and photographs have been exhibited in renowned museums of contemporary art such as Staatliche Kunsthalle Baden-Baden and Künstlerhaus Bethanien, as well as in art galleries such as SOMA gallery Berlin.

== Filmography (selection) ==
=== Director, screenwriter and producer ===
- 2015: Paradise
- 2013: Wind in the Alley (Videoart)
- 2013: Homo (Videoart)
- 2006: Third Gender (Documentary)
- 2004: Freak out (Videoart)

=== Director and screenwriter ===
- 2012: Arghaj (Documentary)
- 2010: Life Tuning (Documentary)
- 2009: Especially Music (Animation, Short)
- 2009: Yar-e-dar (Short with animation)

=== Dramaturgical advisor and producer ===
- 2023: Critical Zone
- 2023: Seven Winters in Tehran
