= Twin Stars (film) =

- Italian: Stella gemella
- Directed by: Luca Lucini
- Written by: Davide Lisino; Luca Lucini; Greta Scicchitano; Ilaria Storti; Marta Storti
- Starring: Martina Gatti; Matteo Olivetti; Margherita Buy; Laura Morante; Jimi Durotoye
- Cinematography: Davide Manca
- Edited by: Carlotta Cristiani
- Music by: Elena Andreoli
- Distributed by: Eagle Pictures
- Release dates: 21 October 2025 (Rome); 14 May 2026 (Italy)
- Running time: 109 minutes
- Country: Italy
- Language: Italian

Twin Stars (Italian: Stella gemella) is a 2025 Italian comedy film directed by Luca Lucini, starring Martina Gatti, Matteo Olivetti, Margherita Buy, Laura Morante, and Jimi Durotoye.

The film premiered at the Rome Film Festival on 21 October 2025, and was released theatrically in Italy on 14 May 2026.

== Cast ==
- Martina Gatti as Stella
- Matteo Olivetti as Achille
- Margherita Buy as Rossana
- Laura Morante as Lucia
- Jimi Durotoye as Gil
- Eugenia Costantini as Mary
- Alessio Moneta as Ascanio
- Mattia Basciani as Flavio
- Fabrizio Colica as Don Pietro
- Paola Buratto as Giulia
- Emanuela Fresi as Gisella
- Luca Ferrini as the gynaecologist
