= Liina Olmaru =

Estonian actress

- Born: Liina-Riin Olmaru; 11 April 1967 (age 59); Tallinn, then part of Estonian SSR, Soviet Union
- Other names: Liina Olmaru-Sammul; Liina-Riin Olmaru-Sammul
- Occupation: Actress
- Years active: 1986–present
- Spouse: Indrek Sammul (m. 1998)
- Children: 3

Liina Olmaru (often credited as Liina-Riin Olmaru; born 11 April 1967) is an Estonian stage, radio, television, and film actress.

== Early life and education ==
Liina-Riin Olmaru was born in 1967 in Tallinn to actors Rein Olmaru and Linda Olmaru (née Kuusmaa). She has three siblings. In 1985, she graduated from Rakvere 1st Secondary School (now, Rakvere Gymnasium). In 1989, she graduated from the Vanemuine theatre teaching studio in Tartu.

Olmaru's interest in theology led her to study at the Institute of Theology of the Estonian Evangelical Lutheran Church, graduating from the institute's Pedagogy Department in 1996.

== Stage career ==
Following her graduation from the Vanemuine's teaching studio, Olmaru joined the theatre as an actress in 1989. She would remain at the Vanemuine until 1998. From 1989 until 1992 also participated in the Tartu Children's Theatre. Following her departure from the Vanemuine, she joined the Tallinn City Theatre in 1998, where she would remain engaged as an actress until 2007 when she joined the Ugala theatre in Viljandi. Olmaru was engaged at the Ugala for three years, leaving in 2010 to return to where her career began; the Vanemuine. From 2010 until 2012 she stayed with the Vanemuine before becoming a freelance actress.

Olmaru's first stage role was as Maria in a production of West Side Story at the Rakvere Theatre in 1986. Other roles that followed during her career on the stage include those by such varied international authors and playwrights as: Shakespeare, Yeats, Ibsen, Dumas, Dostoyevsky, Molière, Witold Gombrowicz, Ray Cooney, J. B. Priestley, Jean Anouilh, Jean Giraudoux, Paul Claudel, Thomas Mann, Yasmina Reza, Gérald Sibleyras, among others. Roles in works by Estonian authors and playwrights include those of: Kulno Süvalep, Karl Ristikivi, A. H. Tammsaare, Jaan Tätte, Urmas Lennuk, Jaan Undusk, Eduard Vilde, and Andri Luup, among several others.

== Television and radio ==
Liina Omaru's first significant television appearances came in 1995 as the character Virve in the Eesti Televisioon (ETV) dramatic television series Wikmani poised, based on the 1988 novel of the same name penned by Estonian author Jaan Kross. In 2007, she appeared in the role of Piret on the Swedish crime drama television series Tusenbröder; the previous year she had played the same character in the Erik Leijonborg directed feature film adaptation of the series titled Tusenbröder - Återkomsten. Also in 2007, she made an appearance on the ETV crime drama series Ohtlik lend as the character Anne Kulik.

In 2008, she played the role of Elfriede Kallaste in nine episodes of the ETV historical drama television mini-series Tuulepealne maa, which was a twelve-part mini-series chronicling the early 20th-century history of Estonia; its birth as a country, the Estonian War of Independence, post-war life throughout 1920 up to 1941 and World War II.

Other television appearances include a small role as Barbi on the Kanal 2 drama series Pilvede all in 2010; and as Ireen in Klass - Elu pärast, which was a 2010 television mini-series follow-up to Klass, the Ilmar Raag directed 2007 feature film about school bullying and violence.

Liina Olmaru has also appeared in a number of memorable radio theatre plays, including the role of Enenken Üüve in Ekke Moor in 2002, as Virve Adamson in Madis Kõiv's Üks teine lugu in 2003, and as Linda Vilde in Heidi Sarapuu's Tervist, härra Vilde! in 2015.

== Film ==
Olmaru's first feature film role was in the 2003 Russian language romantic drama Yantarnye krylya, directed by Andrey Razenkov. This was followed by the role of Piret in the 2006 Swedish language crime thriller Tusenbröder - Återkomsten, directed by Erik Leijonborg for Moviola Film och Television AB and Nordisk Film. The following year she appeared as Veera in the Estonian dramatic film short Öö, directed by Jaanis Valk.

== Personal life ==
Liina Olmaru married actor Indrek Sammul in 1998. The couple have three adopted children; two sons and a daughter. They currently reside in Tallinn.
