= Twin Flower (film) =

- Film poster
- Fiore gemello
- Directed by: Laura Luchetti
- Written by: Laura Luchetti
- Produced by: Giuseppe Gallo
- Starring: Anastasyia Bogach; Kalill Kone; Aniello Arena
- Cinematography: Ferran Rubio Paredes
- Edited by: Paola Freddi
- Music by: Francesco Cerasi
- Release date: 8 September 2018 (TIFF)
- Running time: 96 minutes
- Country: Italy
- Language: Italian

Twin Flower (Italian: Fiore gemello) is an Italian drama film, directed by Laura Luchetti and released in 2018. Set in Sardinia, the film stars Anastasyia Bogach as Anna, a young woman on the run from human traffickers who have murdered her father, and Kalill Kone as Basim, a refugee from Côte d'Ivoire desperately trying to avoid being caught by Italian immigration agents, with the two forming a loving bond as they travel together.

Both Bogach and Kone are non-professional actors in their first-ever film roles. According to Luchetti, "I was looking for real people whose emotions had not been infringed by acting techniques or trying to get in the characters. I wanted two real kids who had gone through the experience of leaving their country, where there was a hard reality, getting on the boat, risking their own lives just for the chance to have a future."

The cast also includes Aniello Arena, Giorgio Colangeli, Mauro Addis, Alessandro Pani and Fausto Verginelli.

The film premiered at the 2018 Toronto International Film Festival, where it received an honorable mention from the FIPRESCI Discovery Prize jury.
