= The Leopard (TV series) =

Italian television series

- Netflix poster
- Italian: Il gattopardo
- Genre: Historical drama
- Created by: Richard Warlow
- Based on: The Leopard by Giuseppe Tomasi di Lampedusa
- Screenplay by: Benji Walters; Richard Warlow
- Directed by: Tom Shankland; Giuseppe Capotondi; Laura Luchetti
- Starring: Kim Rossi Stuart; Benedetta Porcaroli; Saul Nanni; Deva Cassel
- Composer: Paolo Buonvino
- Countries of origin: Italy; United Kingdom
- Original language: Italian
- No. of episodes: 6

Production
- Executive producers: Fabrizio Donvito; Richard Warlow
- Producers: Fabrizio Donvito; Daniel Campos Pavoncelli; Marco Cohen; Benedetto Habib; Alessandro Mascheroni; Will Gould; Firth Tiplady
- Cinematography: Nicolaj Brüel
- Editors: Clelio Benevento; Alessio Doglione
- Running time: 51–61 minutes
- Production companies: Indiana Production; Moonage Pictures

Original release
- Network: Netflix
- Release: 5 March 2025

The Leopard (Italian: Il gattopardo) is a historical drama television series based on Giuseppe Tomasi di Lampedusa's 1958 novel of the same name. Directed by Tom Shankland, Giuseppe Capotondi, and Laura Luchetti, it is the second adaptation of the novel after Luchino Visconti's 1963 film. The series was released on Netflix on 5 March 2025.

== Synopsis ==
The Prince of Salina and his aristocratic family in 19th century Sicily face the changing social landscape of the Risorgimento.

== Cast ==
- Kim Rossi Stuart as Don Fabrizio Corbera, Prince of Salina
- Benedetta Porcaroli as Concetta Corbera di Salina
- Saul Nanni as Tancredi Falconeri
- Deva Cassel as Angelica Sedara
- Francesco Colella as Don Calogero Sedara
- Astrid Meloni as Maria Stella Corbera di Salina
- Paolo Calabresi as Father Pirrone
- Gaetano Bruno as Governor Leonforte
- Francesco Di Leva as Russo
- Alessandro Sperduti as Colonel Bombello
- Jozef Gjura as Tassoni
- Romano Reggiani as Cavriaghi
- Greta Esposito as Chiara Corbera di Salina
- Dalila Ricotta as Caterina Corbera di Salina
- Ruben Mulet Porena as Francesco Corbera di Salina
- Alberto Rossi as Paolo Corbera di Salina
- Anna Ferruzzo as Mother Superior

== Episodes ==
No.	Title	Duration	Original release date
1	"Episode 1"	60 min	5 March 2025
In 1860, Don Fabrizio Corbera fetches his daughter, Concetta, from a convent. Concerned about riots in the area, he takes her to the family estate. Concetta discovers that her cousin, Tancredi, is leaving to fight with General Garibaldi's redshirt army. Fabrizio's son, Paolo, harbors resentment towards Tancredi for being Fabrizio's favorite and spending the family's money. Meanwhile, Fabrizio reveals that he knows his employee, Rossi, has been stealing from him. He opts not to punish Rossi, and asks for the man's loyalty instead. Tancredi writes in secret to Concetta, telling her about the war. When his letters stop, she fears for his safety and informs her father. Fabrizio finds his nephew in a prison on the mainland, and he trades a large amount of land to save Tancredi from execution. When Fabrizio and Tancredi return to Sicily, Paolo accuses Tancredi of being a traitor. The redshirts land on Sicily, and Tancredi rides to meet them.
2	"Episode 2"	59 min	5 March 2025
By June, Garibaldi's forces have taken Sicily. Fabrizio wants to move his family to their summer resident, Donnafugata, but he must obtain permission to travel there from the new regime. Tancredi introduces Fabrizio to Colonel Bombello, who initially refuses the request for a travel permit. However, Bombello is charmed by Concetta, and he approves the permit in exchange for a dance with her at a ball. Tancredi confesses his love to Concetta and asks her to run away with him. Despite her feeling the same way, she refuses to elope. Via the family priest, Father Pirrone, Concetta informs her parents of her love for Tancredi. At first, Fabrizio is upset at the prospect of paying the cash-poor Tancredi a dowry for Concetta, but his wife, Maria Stella, points out the advantages of the match. Tancredi meets Angelica (daughter of the mayor, Calogero Sedara), and he is taken by the young woman's beauty.
3	"Episode 3"	61 min	5 March 2025
Angelica flirts with Tancredi and quickly wins his affection. Fabrizio learns that Sedara has grown wealthy and is attempting to challenge Fabrizio's status in the community. As Tancredi romantically pursues Angelica, Concetta struggles to accept that he no longer loves her. A soldier asks Concetta if he may court her, but she refuses, claiming that she and Tancredi are to be wed. The soldier informs her that it was Tancredi that told him to pursue Concetta. Fabrizio learns of Tancredi and Angelica's relationship, and Fabrizio draws up a marriage contract with Sedara. Maria Stella warns Fabrizio that arranging the marriage will break Concetta's heart, but he counters that the monetary gains will be worth the sacrifice. The community votes to join a united Italy, though the election has been rigged. During a celebration in town, Concetta is alone and heartbroken.
4	"Episode 4"	58 min	5 March 2025
5	"Episode 5"	51 min	5 March 2025
6	"Episode 6"	61 min	5 March 2025

== Production ==
The series was announced on 6 May 2022, corresponding with the opening of Netflix's Italian headquarters in Rome. It was allocated a budget of €40 million.

=== Casting ===
Kim Rossi Stuart, Benedetta Porcaroli, Deva Cassel, and Saul Nanni were announced as cast members on 26 April 2023. Both Nanni and Cassel expressed that they felt honored to reprise the roles of Alain Delon and Claudia Cardinale, respectively.

=== Filming ===
Principal photography began in April 2023. Filming took place over 105 days and required the use of 5,000 extras; 130 carriages, carts, and boats; 100 animals; and 12 animal trainers.

The series was shot on location in Sicily, with specific filming locations including Palermo, Catania, and Syracuse. In Palermo, filming took place at Palazzo Comitini, the Quattro Canti, Palazzo delle Aquile, and Villa Valguarnera. In and around Catania, filming took place at Palazzo Biscari and the Calanchi del Cannizzola. In and around Syracuse, filming took place at Palazzo Beneventano del Bosco and Santa Lucìa alla Badìa, both on the island of Ortygia. Production designer Dimitri Capuani stated that the team specifically avoided locations used in the 1963 film adaptation to differentiate the series from the film.

The series was also shot in Turin, specifically in the Museum of the Risorgimento, Palazzo Carignano, Piazza Carignano, Parco del Valentino, Piazza Palazzo di Città, Palazzo Birago di Borgaro, Palazzo Cisterna, Palazzo Civico, Parco ai Caduti dei Lager Nazisti, and Via Carlo Alberto. Interiors were also shot at Villa Parisi in Rome.

=== Music ===
Il Gattopardo (Colonna sonora della serie Netflix)

Soundtrack album by Paolo Buonvino
- Released: 28 February 2025
- Length: 82:26
- Label: Netflix Music
- Producer: Paolo Buonvino

Paolo Buonvino chronology
Here Now (Original Motion Picture Soundtrack) (2024)	Il Gattopardo (Colonna sonora della serie Netflix) (2025)

Il Gattopardo (Colonna sonora della serie Netflix)
No.	Title	Artist(s)	Length
1.	"Spunta lu Suli - Pt. I"	Paolo Buonvino; Simona Di Gregorio	2:42
2.	"Il valzer del Gattopardo"	Paolo Buonvino	4:04
3.	"L'incanto Sospeso - Pt. I"	Paolo Buonvino	2:25
4.	"Si Fussi Aceddu"	Paolo Buonvino; Simona Di Gregorio	3:28
5.	"Luci e Ombre"	Paolo Buonvino; Coro Cappella Musicale Lauretana	1:02
6.	"Di Speme e di Coraggio"	Paolo Buonvino; Coro Cappella Musicale Lauretana	2:46
7.	"L'alba"	Paolo Buonvino	2:19
8.	"Luce del Mattino"	Paolo Buonvino	1:18
9.	"Lettere dal Fronte"	Paolo Buonvino	2:39
10.	"Sei Benvenuta"	Paolo Buonvino	1:39
11.	"Angelica"	Paolo Buonvino	2:23
12.	"Amunì"	Paolo Buonvino	1:23
13.	"Ombre"	Paolo Buonvino	1:48
14.	"Il tormento di Tancredi"	Paolo Buonvino	4:11
15.	"Trasi Trasi Baiu"	Paolo Buonvino	1:03
16.	"Argivocale"	Paolo Buonvino	1:30
17.	"Il Tempo Negato"	Paolo Buonvino	1:59
18.	"Don Fabrizio"	Paolo Buonvino	2:26
19.	"Potremmo Scappare"	Paolo Buonvino	1:45
20.	"Spunta lu Suli"	Paolo Buonvino; Simona Di Gregorio	1:50
21.	"Nascondino"	Paolo Buonvino	1:16
22.	"Polka della Liberazione"	Paolo Buonvino	1:54
23.	"Mazurka di Palazzo"	Paolo Buonvino	2:08
24.	"Polka Spensierata"	Paolo Buonvino	1:54
25.	"Polka da Elektro-Magnetische - Polka, Op.110"	Paolo Buonvino	2:04
26.	"Valzer da Jerusalem - Act III Pas de Deux"	Paolo Buonvino	1:20
27.	"Valzer da I vespri Siciliani - Act III - Le quattro Stagioni - L'estate"	Paolo Buonvino	3:08
28.	"Avresti Dovuto Essere Tu"	Paolo Buonvino	1:21
29.	"L'incanto Sospeso - Pt. II"	Paolo Buonvino	0:58
30.	"Trame Invisibili"	Paolo Buonvino	1:48
31.	"Arida Sicilia"	Paolo Buonvino	2:04
32.	"Il racconto di Tancredi"	Paolo Buonvino	1:59
33.	"Un Vuoto"	Paolo Buonvino	1:37
34.	"Uno dei Nostri"	Paolo Buonvino	1:48
35.	"Pensando a Bellini"	Paolo Buonvino; Rossella Ruini	6:31
36.	"Tarantella di Donnafugata"	Paolo Buonvino	3:46
37.	"Spunta lu Suli - Pt. II"	Paolo Buonvino; Simona Di Gregorio	2:10
Total length:			82:26

== Release ==
A teaser trailer was released on 19 November 2024. The series was released on Netflix on 5 March 2025. Within five days of its release, the series had been viewed over 3 million times, making the Netflix Top 10 in over 30 countries.
