= Laura Luchetti =

Italian director and screenwriter (born 1974)

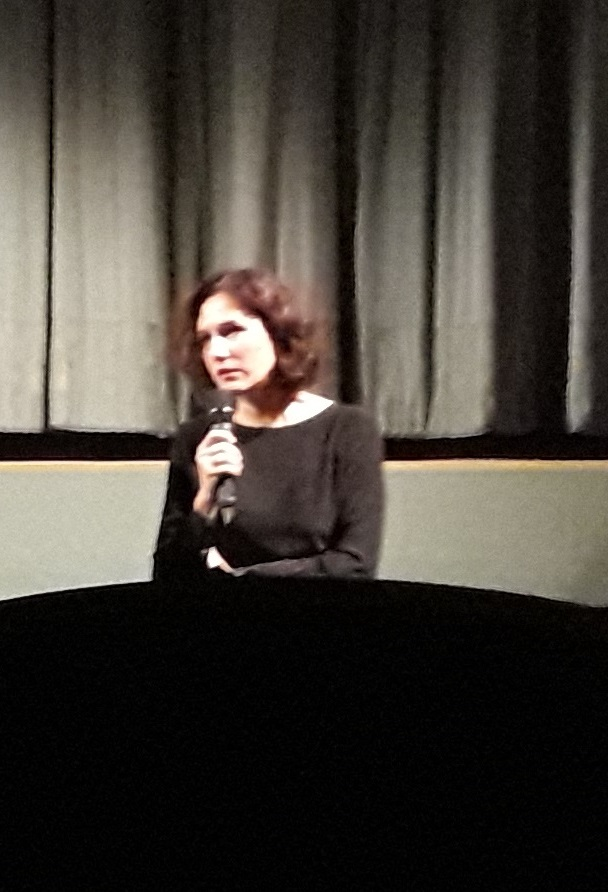
- Luchetti in 2018
- Born: 1974 (age 51–52); Rome, Italy
- Occupations: Director; screenwriter
- Years active: 2002–present

Laura Luchetti (born 1974) is an Italian director and screenwriter.

== Early life ==
Luchetti was born and raised in Rome. She originally graduated with a degree in political science, but later began working as an assistant in the film industry, most notably to Russell Crowe. She lived in England for 13 years.

== Career ==
In 2010, Luchetti made her directorial debut with the film Hayfever. In 2016, she directed her first animated short film, Bagni. In 2018, she directed the drama film Twin Flower, which she had written in 2003. She directed the fifth episode of the Netflix miniseries The Leopard (2025), based on Giuseppe Tomasi di Lampedusa's 1958 novel of the same name.

== Filmography ==
=== Film ===
| Year | Title | Director | Writer | Notes | Ref. |
|---|---|---|---|---|---|
| 2010 | Hayfever | Yes | Yes | | |
| 2016 | Bagni | Yes | Yes | Short film | |
| 2018 | Twin Flower | Yes | Yes | | |
| 2018 | Sugarlove | Yes | Yes | Short film | |
| 2023 | The Beautiful Summer | Yes | Yes | | |

=== Television ===
| Year | Title | Director | Producer | Notes | Ref. |
|---|---|---|---|---|---|
| 2024 | Nudes | Yes | No | 10 episodes | |
| 2025 | The Leopard | Yes | No | 1 episode | |

== Awards and nominations ==
| Award | Year | Category | Nominated work | Result | Ref. |
|---|---|---|---|---|---|
| Chicago International Film Festival | 2023 | Gold Q-Hugo | The Beautiful Summer | Nominated | |
| Etna Comics International Film Festival | 2022 | Best TV series | Nudes | Won | |
| Locarno Film Festival | 2023 | Audience Award | The Beautiful Summer | Nominated | |
| Montpellier Film Festival | 2023 | Antigone d'Or | The Beautiful Summer | Nominated | |
| Nastri d'Argento | 2019 | Best Animated Short Film | Sugarlove | Won | |
| Seattle International Film Festival | 2019 | Grand Jury Prize | Twin Flower | Nominated | |
| Seattle International Film Festival | 2019 | Futurewave Youth Jury Award | Twin Flower | Nominated | |
