= Alejandro Gómez Monteverde =

Mexican filmmaker (born 1977)

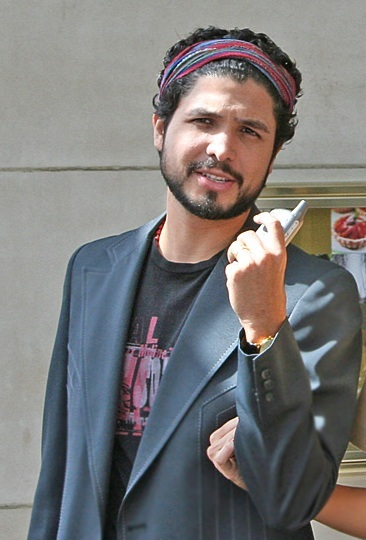
- Monteverde at the 2006 Toronto International Film Festival
- Born: José Alejandro Gómez Monteverde; 13 July 1977 (age 49); Tampico, Tamaulipas, Mexico
- Occupations: Film director; screenwriter; producer
- Years active: 2001–present
- Spouse: Ali Landry (m. 2006)
- Children: 3

José Alejandro Gómez Monteverde (born 13 July 1977) is a Mexican filmmaker. His first film, Bella, took top prize at the 2006 Toronto International Film Festival by winning the "People's Choice Award". He also directed the films Sound of Freedom and Cabrini.

In 2007, Monteverde received the US Citizenship and Immigration Services' "Outstanding American by Choice" Award, which recognizes the achievements of naturalized U.S. citizens.

== Career ==
Monteverde wrote and directed Bella, a film that took top prize at the 2006 Toronto International Film Festival by winning the "People's Choice Award". Bella was produced by Sean Wolfington, Eduardo Verástegui, Leo Severino, and Denise Pinckley. Monteverde and the filmmakers received honors for Bella from the Smithsonian and the White House. The Smithsonian Latino Center also honored Monteverde with their "Legacy Award". After US President George W. Bush and First Lady Laura Bush saw the film, Monteverde was invited to sit with the First Lady in her private box during the annual State of the Union speech in 2007.

Monteverde directed and co-wrote Little Boy, a film set during World War II, released in 2015.

Monteverde directed and co-wrote Sound of Freedom, starring Jim Caviezel, Mira Sorvino and Bill Camp. It was shot in 2018 and was set to be released by 2020, but because of the acquisition of 21st Century Fox by Disney and the film's subsequent shelving, it was not released until Angel Studios acquired it. He also directed the 2024 film Cabrini, which is based on the life of Frances Xavier Cabrini. Like Sound of Freedom, the film is also distributed by Angel Studios.

In 2022, Monteverde was given a Humanitarian Award by the Coronado Island Film Festival.

== Personal life ==
Monteverde married American actress Ali Landry on 8 April 2006 in San Miguel de Allende, Mexico. They have three children: a daughter born in July 2007, and sons born in October 2011, and July 2013. Their son Valentin Francesco's middle name was inspired by Pope Francis, as Monteverde and Landry met him while she was pregnant and he blessed the baby. Monteverde is Catholic.

His father, Juan Manuel Gómez Fernández, and brother, Juan Manuel Gómez Monteverde, were found dead with fatal head wounds in Pueblo Viejo, in the Mexican state of Veracruz, on 19 September 2015, approximately two weeks after they were kidnapped from their home in nearby Tamaulipas. On 9 November 2015, six people were arrested for the kidnapping and murder of Gómez Fernández and Gómez Monteverde. The suspects were allegedly holding six Central American migrants hostage at the time of their arrest, according to the Chief of the Mexican Federal Police.

== Filmography ==
Directed features
| Year | Title | Distributor | Notes |
|---|---|---|---|
| 2006 | Bella | Roadside Attractions | |
| 2015 | Little Boy | Open Road Films (US) / Videocine (Mexico) | |
| 2023 | Sound of Freedom | Angel Studios | |
| 2024 | Cabrini | Angel Studios | |
| 2026 | Zero A. D.: The Birth of Christ | Angel Studios | |
