= Luca Lucini =

Italian film director (born 1967)

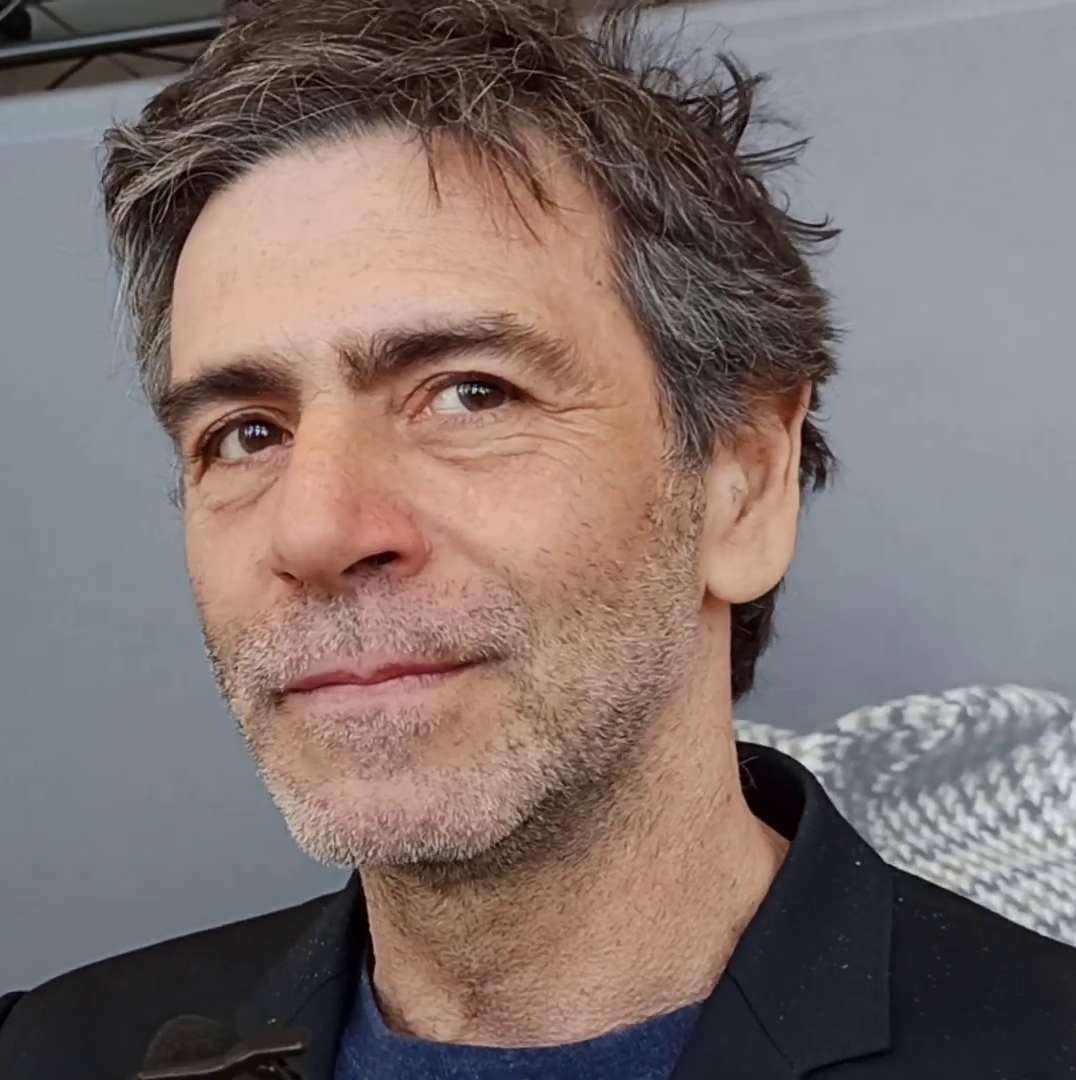
- Born: 26 November 1967 (age 58); Milan, Italy
- Occupation: Film director
- Years active: 2002-present

Luca Lucini (born 26 November 1967) is an Italian film director.

== Filmography ==
- Three Steps Over Heaven (2004)
- L'uomo perfetto (2005)
- Love, Soccer and Other Catastrophes (2008)
- Solo un padre (2008)
- Oggi sposi (2009)
- The Woman of My Dreams (2010)
- Best Enemies Forever (2016)
- Alex & Co: How to Grow Up Despite Your Parents (2016)
- Io e mio fratello (2023)
- My Paper Dolls (2023)
- L'amore, in teoria (2025)
- Twin Stars (2025)
