= At the Revolutionary Festival =

- Directed by: Arnaldo Catinari
- Release date: 2026

At the Revolutionary Festival is a 2026 film directed and co-written by Arnaldo Catinari.

== Plot ==
In 1919, following the end of the World War I, the Kingdom of Italy took part in the Paris Peace Conference to determine the geopolitical reorganization of Europe. The city of Fiume experienced a period of intense social and political unrest due to the dispute between the Kingdom of Italy and the Kingdom of Serbs, Croats and Slovenes over its sovereignty. In this context, Gabriele D’Annunzio led an expedition and occupied the city on 12 September 1919.

After surviving an assassination attempt thanks to the intervention of Giulio Leone, an anarchist doctor and deserter from the Battle of Caporetto, D’Annunzio becomes indirectly connected to Pietro Brandi, a man who claims allegiance to the ideals of the poet’s attacker while expressing political views aligned with the Fasci Italiani di Combattimento, a movement seeking to oppose D’Annunzio’s political ambitions. During these events, the two men encounter Beatrice Superbi, a Russian pianist secretly working as a spy for the Russian government.

Bound together by fate and by a passionate love intrigue, the lives of the three protagonists unfold against the backdrop of the Treaty of Rapallo and culminate in the events of Christmas 1920, when the Kingdom of Italy forcibly evacuated the city, forever altering their destinies.

== Production ==
Filming took place between October and November 2024, primarily in the Friuli-Venezia Giulia region, with scenes shot in Udine, Pradamano, at Villa Giacomelli, and in Trieste.

== Distribuction ==
After being presented in the “Grand Public” section at the 2025 Rome Film Festival, the film is scheduled to be released in Italian cinemas by 01 Distribution starting from 16 April 2026.

== Reception ==
=== Box Office ===
The film earned €164,827 at the box office.

=== Critical response ===
The film received mixed reviews from film critics.

Vania Amitrano of Ciak Magazine stated that it is “a film that, in its outward structure, succeeds in symbolically and visually conveying the full complexity of a historical passage,” praising Arnaldo Catinari’s directorial choices, which she finds well suited to the “necessary visual representation of D’Annunzio’s visionary and artistic experience.” However, she noted that at the screenplay level it “introduces certain historical distortions that generate a degree of ambiguity,” as “the narrative, already complex from a historical perspective, becomes dispersed across multiple layers and at times less fluid.”
