= Giona A. Nazzaro =

Italian film critic

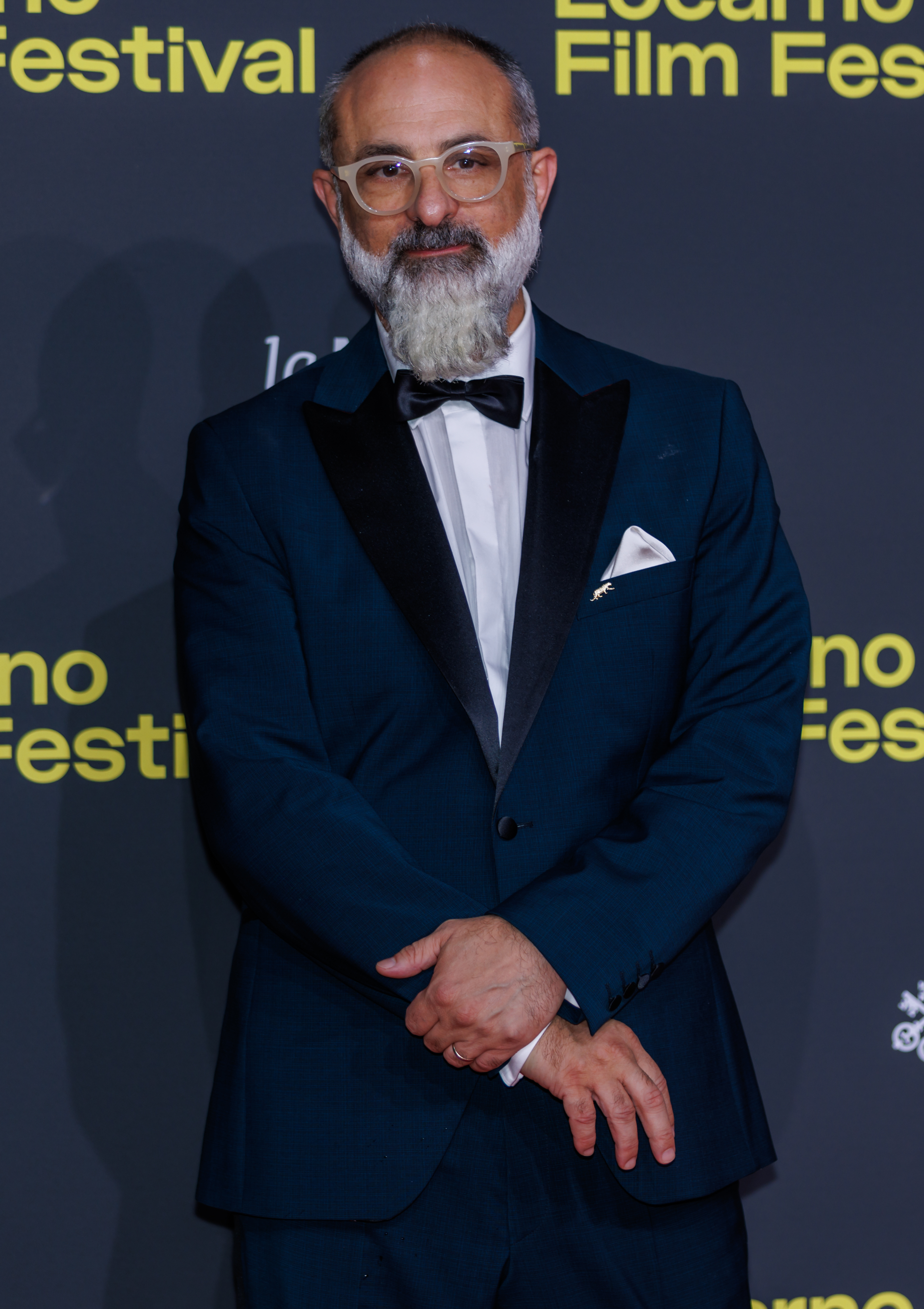
- Giona A. Nazzaro in 2025
- Born: 1 June 1965 (age 61); Zürich, Switzerland
- Occupation: Artistic director
- Organization: Locarno Festival

Giona A. Nazzaro (born 1 June 1965) is the artistic director of the Locarno Film Festival.

He is also the General Delegate of the Venice International Film Critics’ Week. and a member of the selection committee at the International Film Festival Rotterdam and he collaborates with the Locarno Film Festival and the Visions du Réel Nyon. He is a board member of the European Film Awards. He was named the artistic director of the Locarno Film Festival in November 2020 after the resignation of Lili Hinstin.

A member of the Union of Italian Film Critics (SNCCI) Nazzaro is a regular contributor to the Italian newspaper Il Manifesto and the bimonthly magazine MicroMega.

He is the author of several books on cinema: Il cinema di Hong Kong – Spade, kung fu, pistole, fantasmi (Le mani, 1997), John Woo – La nuova leggenda del cinema d'azione (Castelvecchi, 2000); Il dizionario dei film di Hong Kong (Universitaria Editrice, 2005), Action – Forme di un transgenere cinematografico (Le mani, 2000) and Il conflitto delle idee. Al cinema con MicroMega (Bietti, 2014). Nazzaro is also the author of the novel A Mon Dragone c'è il Diavolo (Perdisa Pop, 2010).
