= Fisnik Maxville =

Kosovo-Swiss filmmaker

- Born: Fisnik Maxhuni circa. 1992; Prishtina, Kosovo
- Education: Université de Genève, King's College London
- Notable work: Lost Exile; The Land Within; Nostromo
- Website: instagram.com/fisnik.maxville

Fisnik Maxville (also known as Fisnik Maxhuni, born 1992 or 1993) is a Kosovo-Swiss film director, screenwriter and producer.

His directorial debut The Land Within premiered at the 2022 Tallinn Black Nights Film Festival where it received the main award "Best First Film" of its category, followed by a nomination at the Swiss Film Awards in the "Best Music" category.

== Early life and education ==
Born in Pristina, Kosovo, Fisnik fled to Switzerland with his family at the age of five. Growing up in Neuchâtel, their refugee status had to be renewed until obtaining Swiss citizenship in 2005.

He graduated from a Bachelor's degree in international relations from the University of Geneva followed by a Master's degree in geopolitics from King's College London. In 2012, he worked for the Swiss Federal Department of Foreign Affairs (DEA-DFAE) as a diplomatic trainee at the Swiss Embassy in Tokyo.

Upon returning to Switzerland, he continued his studies with a Master's in film directing at ECAL/HEAD (Lausanne-Geneva/ Switzerland). During his studies he co-directed in Sarajevo a short film, Ministarstvo Sjecanja, under the mentorship of Hungarian director Béla Tarr.

His graduation short film Lost Exile (2016) premiered in Locarno Film Festival and won a jury prize. The film tells the story of Hana, a Kosovar immigrant trying to illegally emigrate to Europe but is being smuggled through a prostitution ring.

== Career ==
After graduating, he co-founded his production company Visceral Films in 2017, where he produced, wrote and directed a short film, The Valley of Happiness which was shot in Iran and went on to premiere at the 41st São Paulo International Film Festival.

In 2018, he co-directed his first feature-length documentary, Zvicra, that explored over the course of two years questions relating to integration in Switzerland, through several Kosovo-born protagonists living in Switzerland. Two years later, in 2018, he directed a portrait documentary about Bernard Challandes, a Swiss football coach heading the newly-founded Kosovo Football National Team, co-produced by the Radio Télévision Suisse.

In 2019, Maxville was part of the Ateliers d'Angers screenwriting lab, followed in 2020 by a participation at the Berlinale Talents cohort.

In 2021, he premiered his documentary Nostromo, shot in the Arctic circle of Canada, following Olivier, a Frenchman living by himself on a small island. The film premiered at the 2020 Visions du Réel documentary film festival, it was awarded the SRG SSR Award for Best National Film. The film went on to be presented at the São Paulo International Film Festival 2021 and the 2022 Solothurner Filmtage.

His directorial debut The Land Within, a co-production between Switzerland and Kosovo, premiered at the 2022 Tallinn Black Nights Film Festival in the First Feature competitive section. The film received the "Best First Film" award. After being part of the 2023 Locarno Film Festival in the Panorama section, the film makes its Kosovo premiere as the opening film of the Prishtina Film Festival 2023.

Early 2023, Maxville announced his upcoming feature project Reel Skin and participated in its development at the Atelier Grand Nord in Canada.

In August 2025, the development of Reel Skin was awarded the SSA - Swiss Society of Authors' 2025 Writing Fellowship, with the ceremony taking place at the Locarno Film Festival. The film is planned to enter production in 2026.
