= 20th Rome Film Festival =

2025 edition of Rome Film Festival

Festa del Cinema di Roma
- Official poster
- Opening film: Life Goes This Way by Riccardo Milani
- Closing film: Vita da Carlo (TV series 4 episodes)
- Location: Auditorium Parco della Musica, Rome
- Founded: 2006
- Awards: Best Film: Left-Handed Girl by Shih-Ching Tsou
- Directors: Francesca Via
- Hosted by: Cinema Per Roma Foundation; Rome City of Film
- Artistic director: Paola Malanga
- No. of films: 198
- Festival date: Opening: 15 October 2025; Closing: 26 October 2025
- Language: International
- Website: www.romacinemafest.it

Rome Film Festival
- 21st 19th

The 20th Rome Film Festival was held from 15 October in the Auditorium Parco della Musica, Rome till 26 October 2025. The festival opened with 2025 Italian comedy film Life Goes This Way by Riccardo Milani. Paola Cortellesi, an Italian actress, comedian, film director, screenwriter and producer served as the president of the jury of the Progressive Cinema Competition.

Ema Stokholma, a DJ, host, actress, writer and singer, hosted the opening of the festival on 15 October in Sala Sinopoli of the Auditorium Parco della Musica Ennio Morricone. She also hosted the closing ceremony and the awards presentation ceremony on 25 October in Sala Petrassi. The Taiwanese-American drama film Left-Handed Girl written, directed and produced by Shih-Ching Tsou, won the Best film award, while French drama film Nino by Pauline Loquès won the Grand Jury Prize, as announced during the presentation.

In the 20th edition of the festival 198 films from 38 countries had 436 screenings with the total attendance of 116,503 people.

The festival concluded on 26 October 2025 with re-run of winning films and screening of the final season of Carlo Verdone's TV series Vita da Carlo, which is a portrayal of the drama and the comedy of Carlo Verdone's private life.

== Highlights ==
The festival celebrated birth centenary of Franco Pinna, Italian photographer of the second half of the 20th century. The official poster of the festival is a shot taken by him on the set of Federico Fellini's 1965 fantasy comedy-drama film, Juliet of the Spirits. David Puttnam, British-Irish film producer, educator, environmentalist and former member of the House of Lords, was honoured with Industry Lifetime Achievement Award at the opening ceremony. He received the award from Britain-based Italian director and screenwriter Uberto Pasolini.

Jafar Panahi, Iranian film director, screenwriter, and editor and Richard Linklater, American filmmaker were honoured with Lifetime Achievement Award by Italian film director and screenwriter Giuseppe Tornatore and Italian film director, screenwriter, and actor Marco Bellocchio respectively. On 16 October the New York filmmaker Nia DaCosta was presented with the Progressive Lifetime Achievement Award by the festival's Artistic Director Paola Malanga.

On 19 September 2025, the festival unveiled its line-up. The festival showcased 191 titles from 38 countries.

== Jury ==
The jury for the competitive sections was announced on 29 July 2025. The jury will decide Best Film, Grand Jury Prize, Best Director, Best Screenplay, the "Monica Vitti" Award for Best Actress, the "Vittorio Gassman" Award for Best Actor and the Special Jury Prize in Progressive Cinema Competition.

=== Progressive Cinema Competition Award ===
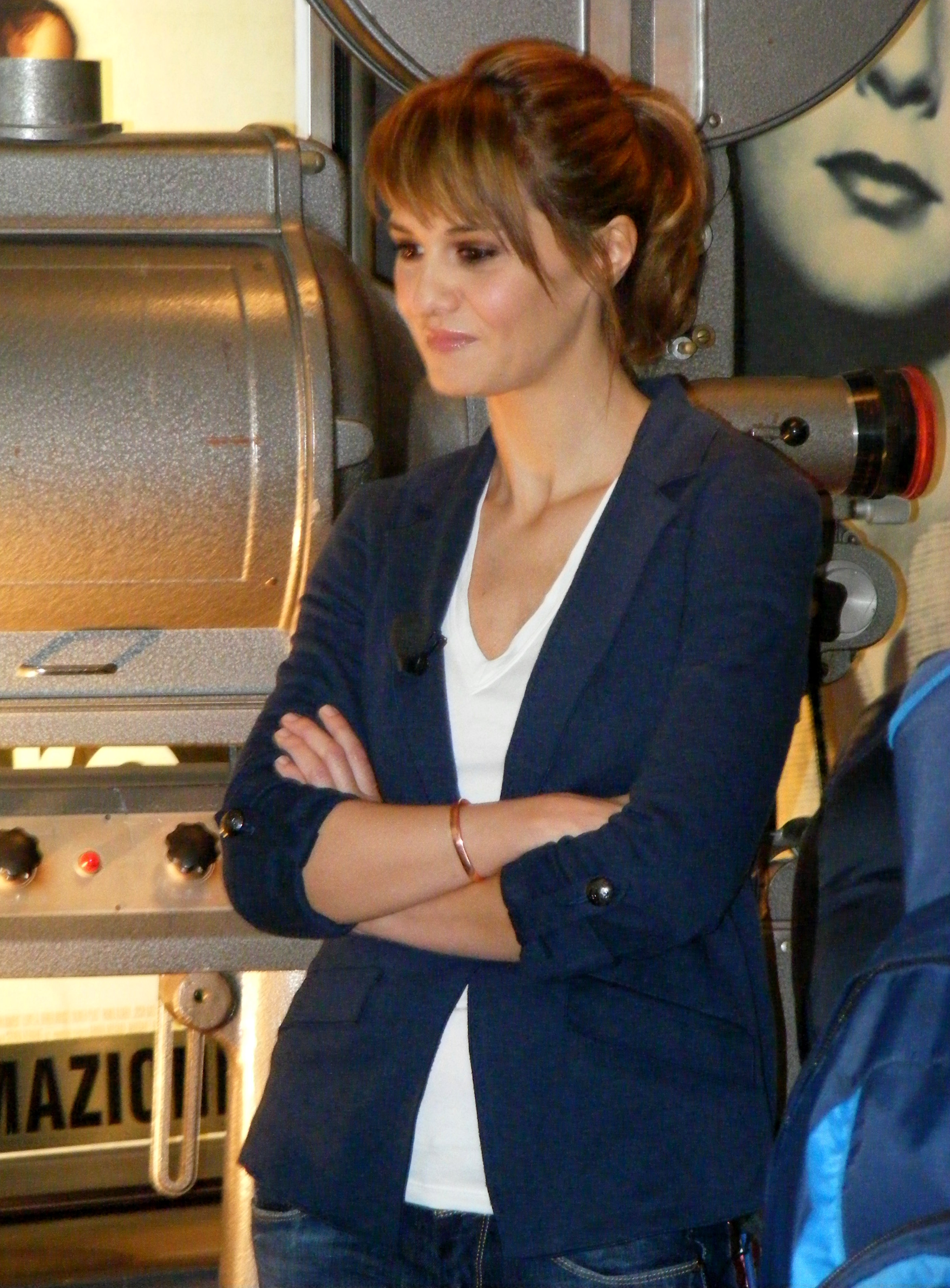
Paola Cortellesi, Jury President

- Paola Cortellesi, an Italian actress, comedian, film director, screenwriter and producer (Jury President)
- Teemu Nikki, a Finnish director and screenwriter
- William Oldroyd, a British director and screenwriter
- Brian Selznick, an American writer and illustrator
- Nadia Tereszkiewicz, a French-Finnish actress

=== Progressive Cinema, Freestyle and Grand Public Competition sections ===
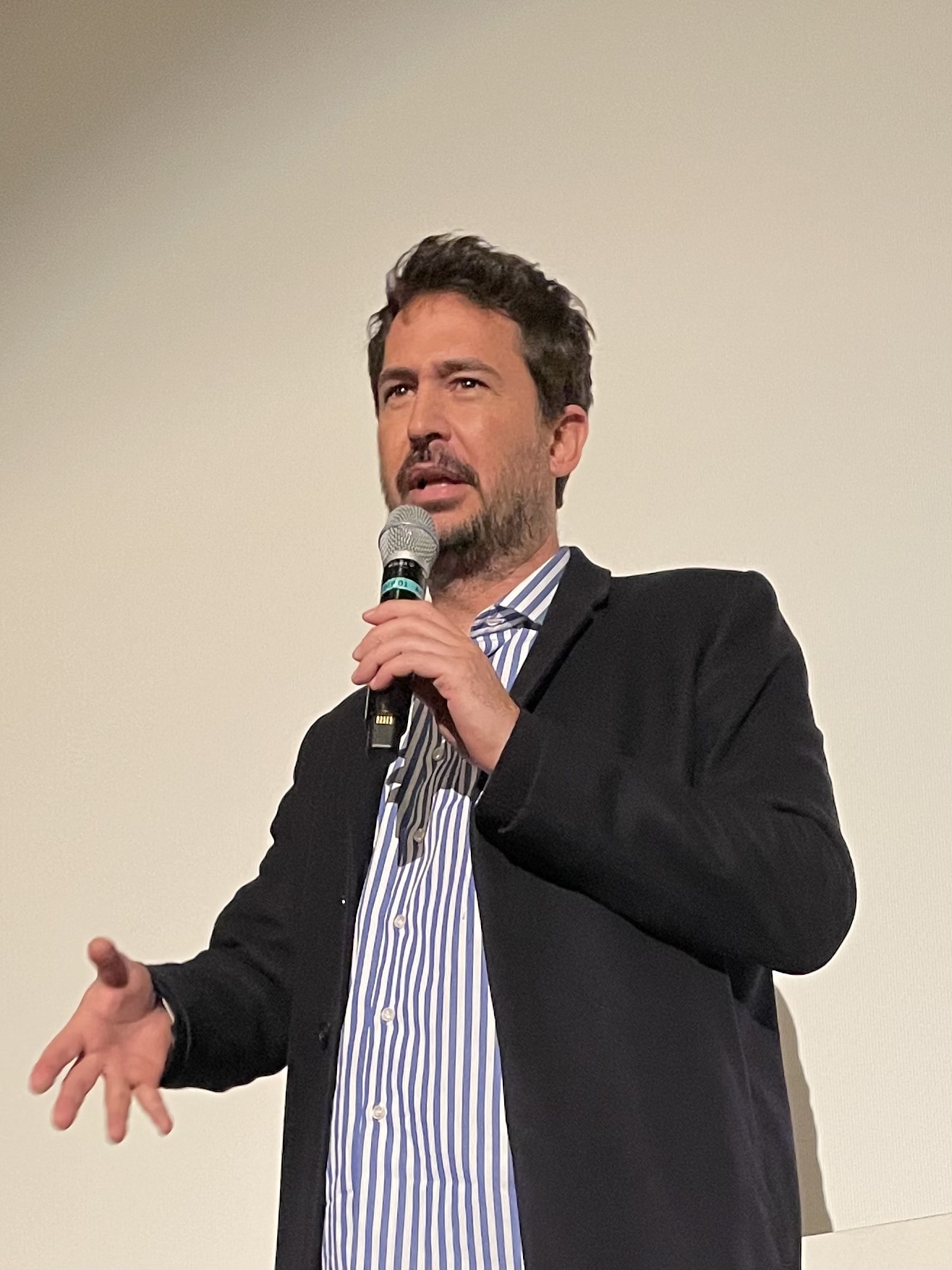
Santiago Mitre, Jury President

- Santiago Mitre, Argentine film director and screenwriter (Jury President)
- Patrick Dickinson, Anglo-Irish director and screenwriter
- Barbara Ronchi, Italian actress

== Events ==
=== Celebration of Franco Pinna ===
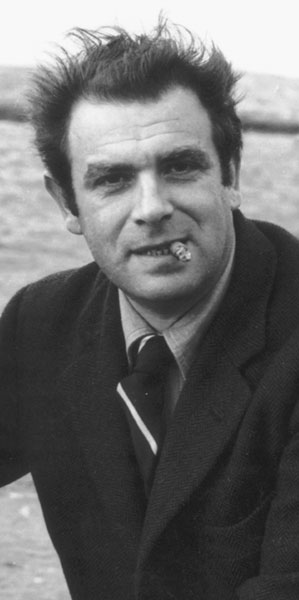
Franco Pinna, Italian photographer

Festa del Cinema will honor the 100th birth anniversary of Italian photographer Franco Pinna with three parallel exhibitions titled "Franco Pinna Photographer. Tribute to a Century." Curated by Paolo Pisanelli and organized by Archivio Franco Pinna and OfficinaVisioni, the exhibitions will be showcased in key festival venues, in collaboration with Cinema del reale, Erratacorrige, and Big Sur.

== Official sections ==
The twentieth edition will have following sections:

- Progressive Cinema Competition
- Freestyle
- Grand public
- Special screenings
- Best of 2025
- History of cinema
- Special events

=== Opening film ===
La vita va così starring Virginia Raffaele, Diego Abatantuono, and Aldo Baglio, a "humorous twenty-year story set in a wonderful corner of Sardinia" was selected as the opening film of the festival.

English title	Original title	Director(s)	Production country(ies)
Life Goes This Way	La vita va così	Riccardo Milani	Italy

=== Progressive Cinema Competition - Visions for the World of Tomorrow ===
English title	Original title	Director(s)	Production country(ies)
40 Seconds	40 secondi	Vincenzo Alfieri	Italy
The Eyes Of Others	Gli occhi degli altri	Andrea De Sica	Italy
Good Boy		Jan Komasa	Poland, United Kingdom
Hen	Kota	György Pálfi	Germany, Greece, Hungary
This Island	Esta Isla	Lorraine Jones Molina, Cristian Carretero	Puerto Rico
Left-Handed Girl	左撇子女孩	Shih-Ching Tsou	Taiwan, France, United States, United Kingdom
Mad Bills to Pay (or Destiny, dile que no soy malo)		Joel Alfonso Vargas	United States
Nino		Pauline Loquès	France
Our Hero, Balthazar		Oscar Boyson	United States
The Piano Accident	L'Accident de piano	Quentin Dupieux	France
Queen of Coal	Miss Carbón	Agustina Macri	Spain, Argentina
Re-creation		Jim Sheridan, David Merriman	Ireland, Luxembourg
Roberto Rossellini, More Than a Life		Ilaria de Laurentiis , Andrea Paolo Massara and Raffaele Brunetti	Italy, Latvia
Sciatunostro		Leandro Picarella	Italy
Six Days in Spring	Six Jours Ce Printemps-There	Joachim Lafosse	Belgium, France, Luxembourg
The Things You Kill		Alireza Khatami	Turkey, France, Poland, Canada
Wild Nights, Tamed Beasts	Chang Ye Jiang Jin	Wang Tong	China
Winter of the Crow		Kasia Adamik	Poland, Luxembourg, United Kingdom

=== Freestyle ===
==== Films ====
English title	Original title	Director(s)	Production country(ies)
The Big Bowl		Karen Di Porto	Italy
California Schemin'		James McAvoy	United Kingdom
The Council Chamber	La camera di consiglio	Fiorella Infascelli	Italy
Keep Me in Mind		Alberto Palmiero	Italy
Malavia		Nunzia De Stefano	Italy
Unseen Pictures	L'Oeuvre Invisible	Avril Tembouret, Vladimir Rodionov	France
Peter Hujar's Day		Ira Sachs	United States
Mehdi's Little Cuisine	La petite cuisine de Mehdi	Amine Adjina	France
Queens of the Dead		Tina Romero	United States

==== Arts ====
English title	Original title	Director(s)	Production countr y(ies)
Cannibals	Cannibali	Hilary Tiscione	Italy
Catartis - Preserving The Future		Ferdinando Vicentini Orgnani	Italy
Comedy Doesn't Exist. Salemme Tries Eduardo		Raffaele Rago	Italy
Dacia, My Life - Japanese Dialogues		Izumi Chiaraluce	Italy
Easy to Love - The True Story Of Massimo Urbani		Paolo Colangeli	Italy
Ellroy Vs La		Francesco Zippel	Italy
L'énigme Velázquez	L'énigme Velázquez	Stéphane Sorlat	France
I Love Lucca Comics & Games		Manlio Castagna	Italy
It's Never Over, Jeff Buckley		Amy J. Berg	United States
The Force of Destiny		Anissa Bonnefont	Italy, France
Looking for Nivola		Peter Marcias	Italy
The Librarians		Kim A. Snyder	United States
Beyond the Border: Images Of Francesco And Mimmo Jodice		Matteo Parisini	Italy
Pirandello - The Giant In Love		Costanza Quatriglio	Italy
Procès D'un Jeune Poète	Procès D'un Jeune Poète	Philippe Van Cutsem	Belgium
Rino Gaetano - Ever Blur		Giorgio Verdelli	Italy
Stardust: A Story of Love and Architecture		Jim Venturi, Anita Naughton	United States
Stile Albert		Michele Masneri, Antongiulio Panizzi	Italy
Tutta Vita		Valentina Cenni	Italy

==== Series ====
English title	Original title	Director(s)	Production country y(ies)
The Anatomy of a Moment	Anatomía de un instante	Alberto Rodríguez Librero	Spain, France
Choose Earth		Anne de Carbuccia	United States, Italy
The Deal		Jean-Stéphane Bron	Switzerland, France, Luxembourg, Belgium
Mrs Playmen		Riccardo Donna	Italy
Sandokan		Jan Maria Michelini, Nicola Abbatangelo	Italy
Tupa 13		Teemu Nikki	Finland
Vita da Carlo		Carlo Verdone	Italy
Warriors – The Rule of Balance		Gianluca Maria Tavarelli	Italy

=== Grand public ===
English title	Original title	Director(s)	Production country y(ies)
& Sons		Pablo Trapero	United Kingdom, Canada
Alla festa della Rivoluzione		Arnaldo Catinari	Italy
ANNA: The First Film on Anna Magnani		Monica Guerritore	Italy
The Big Fake	Il falsario	Stefano Lodovichi	Italy
Breve storia d'amore		Ludovica Rampoldi	Italy
Couture		Alice Winocour	United States, France
Dracula		Luc Besson	France
Elena's War	Elena del ghetto	Stefano Casertano	Italy
Five Seconds	Cinque secondi	Paolo Virzì	Italy
Glenrothan		Brian Cox	United Kingdom
Hamnet		Chloé Zhao	United Kingdom, United States
Hedda		Nia DaCosta	United States
Homo Argentum		Gastón Duprat, Mariano Cohn	Argentina
Illusion	Illusione	Francesca Archibugi	Italy
Life Goes This Way	La vita va così	Riccardo Milani	Italy
Out of Truth	Fuori la verità	Davide Minnella	Italy
Twin Stars	Stella gemella	Luca Lucini	Italy
Two Pianos	Deux Pianos	Arnaud Desplechin	France

=== Special screenings ===
English title	Original title	Director(s)	Production country y(ies)
2000 Meters to Andriivka	2000 метрів до Андріївки	Mstyslav Chernov	Ukraine
Belén		Dolores Fonzi	Argentina
The Better Truth		Lorenza Indovina	Italy
Cuba & Alaska		Yegor Troyanovsky	Ukraine, France, Belgium
The Guitar in the Rock - Lucio Corsi live at the Abbey of San Galgano		Tommaso Ottomano	Italy
The Diaspora of the Sails		Francesca Comencini	Italy
Ecce Mole		Heinz Emigholz	Italy
The Most Beautiful Son		Giovanni Piperno, Stefano Rulli	Italy
I Am Curious Johnny		Julien Temple	Italy
Kenny Dalglish		Asif Kapadia	United Kingdom
Ni Primera Ni Dama		Barbara Cupisti	Italy
Us and the Great Ambition		Andrea Segre	Italy
Pontifex - A Bridge Between Mercy and Hope		Daniele Ciprì	Italy
The Prince of Madness		Dario D'Ambrosi	Italy
Put Your Soul on Your Hand and Walk		Sepideh Farsi	France, Palestine
Hurry Up. Chefs on Leave		Claudia Gerini	Italy
Wider Than the Sky		Valerio Jalongo	Italy, Switzerland

=== Best of 2025 ===
English title	Original title	Director(s)	Production country(ies)
The Secret Agent	O Agente Secreto	Kleber Mendonça Filho	Brazil, France, Germany, Netherlands
Die My Love		Lynne Ramsay	United States
Dreams		Michel Franco	Mexico, United States
Eddington		Ari Aster	United States
If I Had Legs I'd Kick You		Mary Bronstein	United States
Yes	כן!	Nadav Lapid	Israel, France, Germany, Cyprus, United Kingdom
Leibniz – Chronicle of a Lost Painting	Leibniz – Chronik eines verschollenen Bildes	Edgar Reitz and Anatol Schuster	Germany
Nouvelle Vague		Richard Linklater	France
Once Upon a Time in Gaza		Tarzan and Arab Nasser	Palestine, France, Portugal
It Was Just an Accident	یک تصادف ساده	Jafar Panahi	Iran, France, Luxembourg

=== History of cinema ===
==== Documentaries ====
English title	Original title	Director(s)	Production country(ies)
Becoming Hitchcock: The Legacy of Blackmail		Laurent Bouzereau	France, United Kingdom, United States
The Cruise		Bennett Miller	United States
Il cinema secondo Corman		Giulio Laroni	Italy

=== Special events ===
==== A Tribute to Susan Seidelman ====
Susan Seidelman is an American film director, producer, and writer.

English title	Original title	Director(s)	Cast
Desperately Seeking Susan		Susan Seidelman	United States

==== The Anniversaries ====
Year of release	English title	Original title	Director(s)	Production country(ies)
2000	One Hundred Steps	I cento passi	Marco Tullio Giordana	Italy, Spain
1975	The Rocky Horror Picture Show		Jim Sharman	United Kingdom, United States
2025	Strange Journey: The Story of Rocky Horror		Linus O'Brien	United States

==== A Tribute to Claudio Caligari ====
Claudio Caligari was an Italian director and screenwriter. The production country of all the films is Italy.

English title	Original title	Director(s)	Cast
Don't Be Bad	Non essere cattivo	Claudio Caligari	Luca Marinelli, Alessandro Borghi, Silvia D'Amico, Roberta Mattei
Toxic Love	Amore tossico	Claudio Caligari	Cesare Ferretti, Michela Mioni, Enzo Di Benedetto, Roberto Stani
The Scent of the Night	L'odore della notte	Claudio Caligari	Valerio Mastandrea, Marco Giallini, Alessia Fugardi, Giorgio Tirabassi
The Madness of the Revolution	La follia della rivoluzione	Claudio Caligari	Documentary
The Lower Part	La Parte Bassa	Claudio Caligari, Franco Barbero	Documentary

==== Restorations ====
English title	Original title	Director(s)	Production country(ies)
The Big Heat (1953)		Fritz Lang	United States
The Day of the Locust (1975)		John Schlesinger	United States
The Assassination of Matteotti (1973)	Il delitto Matteotti	Florestano Vancini	Italy
Dirty Harry (1971)		Don Siegel	United States
Libera (1993)		Pappi Corsicato	Italy
Victory March (1976)	Marcia trionfale	Marco Bellocchio	Italy
Misery (1990)		Rob Reiner	United States
Norma Rae (1979)		Martin Ritt	United States
Who Killed Pasolini? (1995)	Pasolini, un delitto italiano	Marco Tullio Giordana	Italy, France
A Pilot Returns (1942)	Un pilota ritorna	Roberto Rossellini	Italy

=== Tribute to David Puttnam – Industry Lifetime Achievement Award ===
David Puttnam, British-Irish film producer, educator, environmentalist and former member of the House of Lords.

English title	Original title	Director(s)	Production country(ies)
Chariots of Fire		Hugh Hudson	United States, United Kingdom
Local Hero		Bill Forsyth	United Kingdom
The Mission		Roland Joffé	United States, United Kingdom

== Awards ==
The jury awarded the following prizes to the films presented in the festival:

=== Progressive Cinema Competition - Visions for the World of Tomorrow ===
- Best Film: Left-Handed Girl by Shih-Ching Tsou, Taiwan, France, United States, United Kingdom
- Jury Grand Prix: Nino by Pauline Loquès
- Best Director: Wang Tong for Wild Nights, Tamed Beasts
- Best Screenplay: Alireza Khatami for The Things You Kill
- Best Actress – Monica Vitti Award
  - Prize: Jasmine Trinca for [The Eyes Of Others
- Best Actor – Vittorio Gassman Award
  - Prize: Anson Boon for Good Boy
- Special Jury Prize: To the cast of film 40 secondi

=== Poste Italiane Best First Feature Award ===
- Keep Me in Mind by Alberto Palmiero

=== Best Documentary Award ===
- Cuba & Alaska by Yegor Troyanovsky

=== Terna Audience Award ===
- Roberto Rossellini, More Than a Life by Ilaria de Laurentiis , Andrea Paolo Massara and Raffaele Brunetti

=== Industry Lifetime Achievement Award ===
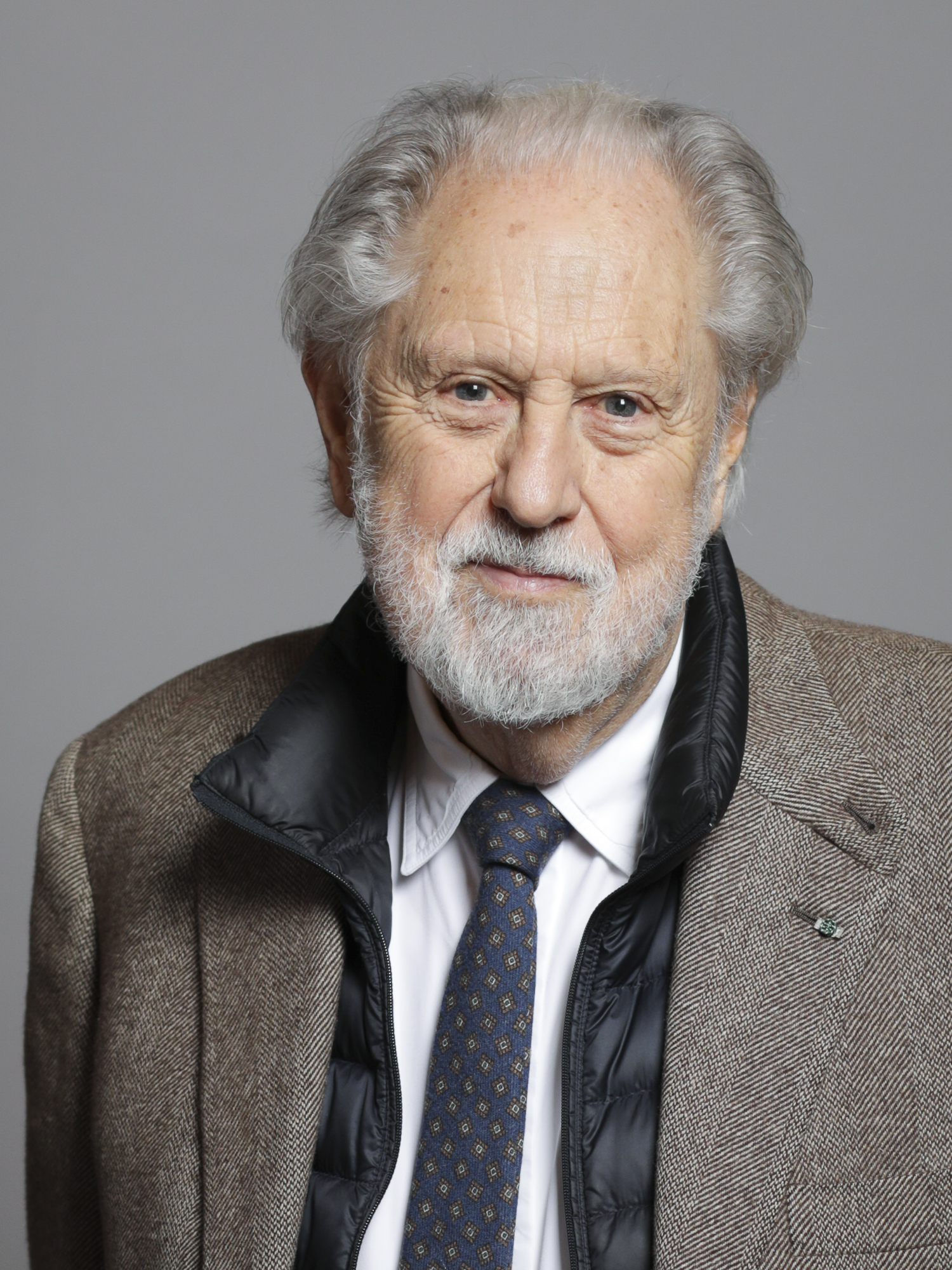
David Puttnam, recipient of Industry Lifetime Achievement Award

- David Puttnam, British-Irish film producer, educator, environmentalist and former member of the House of Lords.

=== Lifetime Achievement Award ===
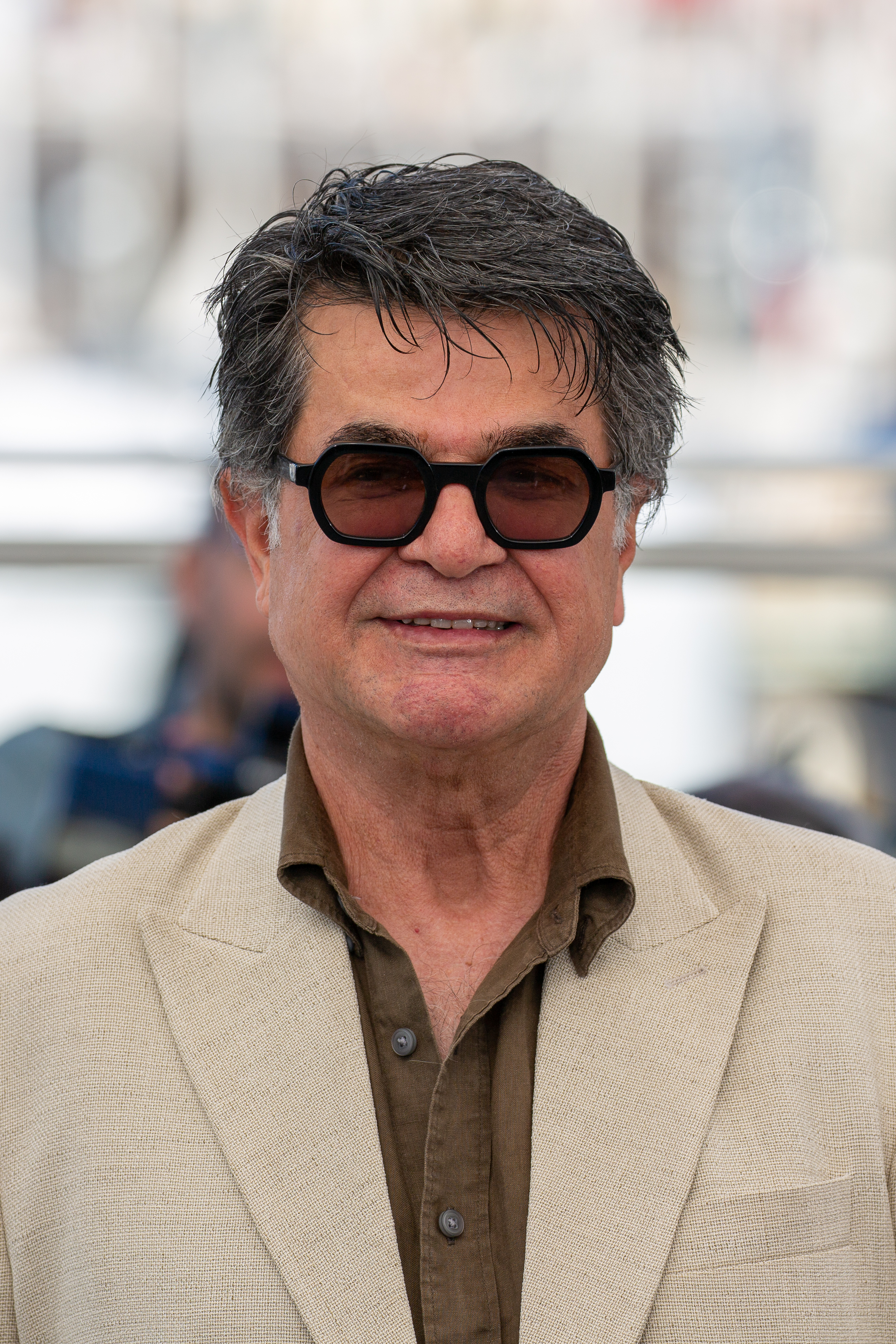
Jafar Panahi recipient of Lifetime Achievement Award

  - Jafar Panahi, Iranian film director, screenwriter, and editor

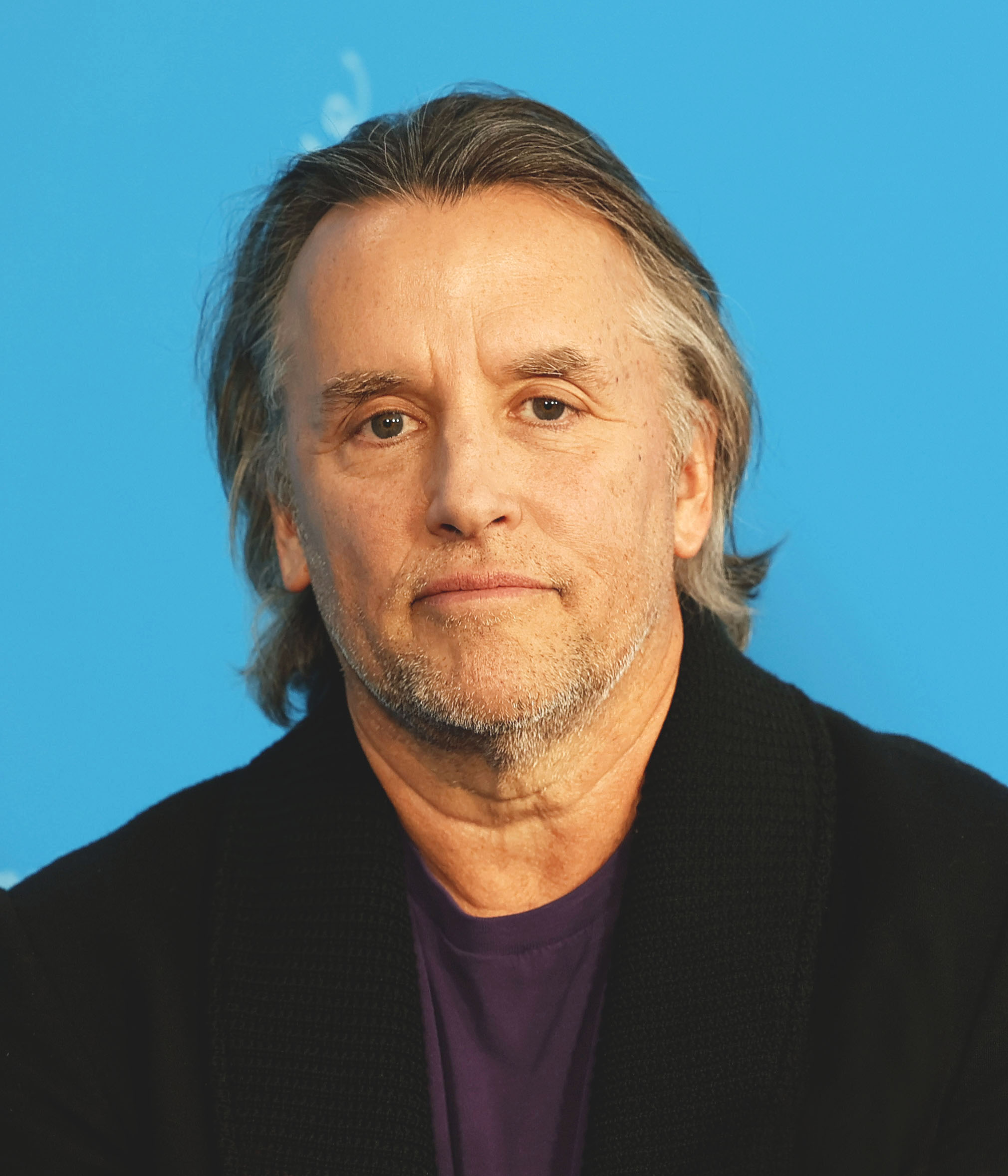
Richard Linklater recipient of Lifetime Achievement Award

  - Richard Linklater, American filmmaker

=== Progressive Lifetime Achievement Award ===
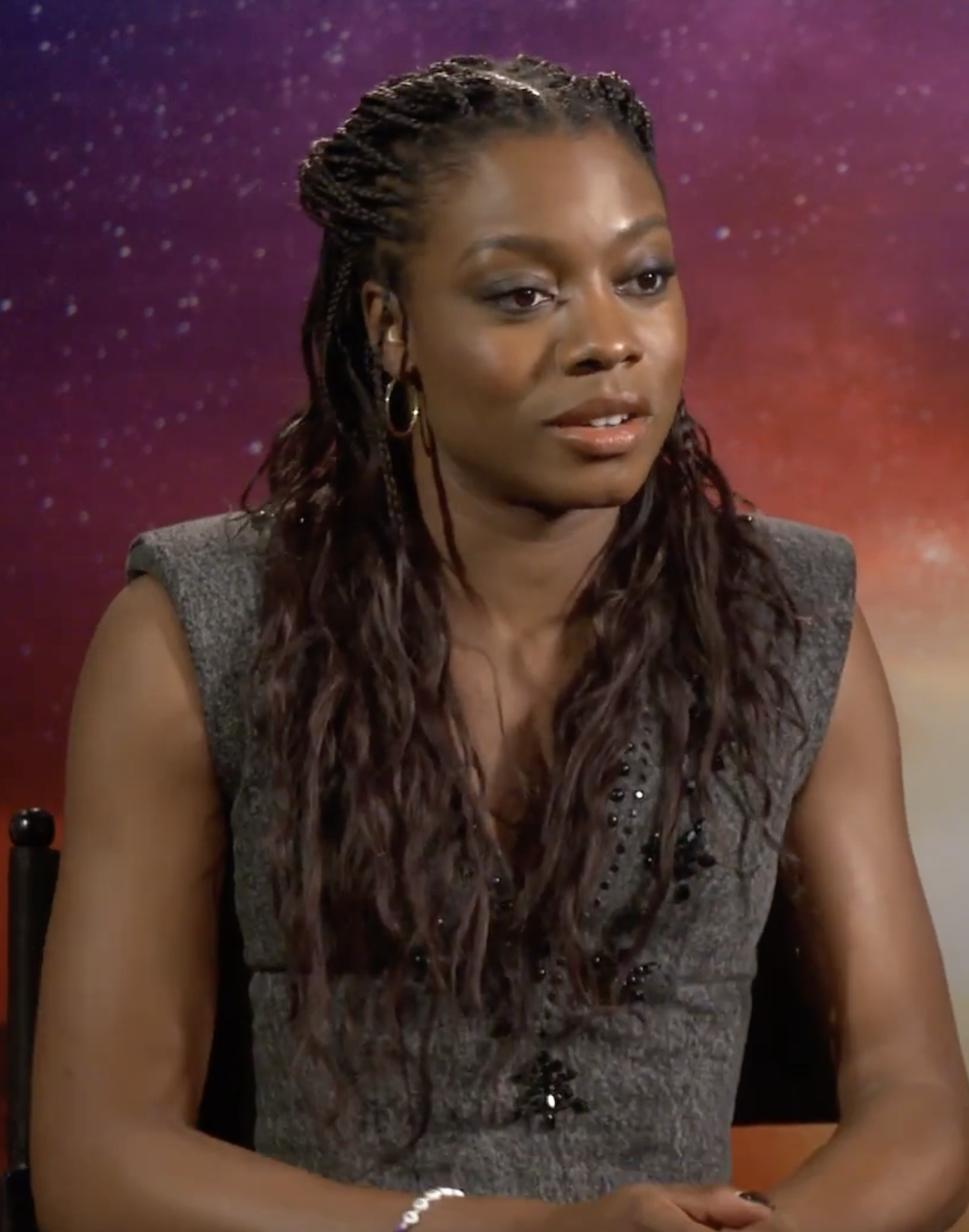
Nia DaCosta recipient of Progressive Lifetime Achievement Award

- Nia DaCosta, American filmmaker

=== Master of Film Award ===
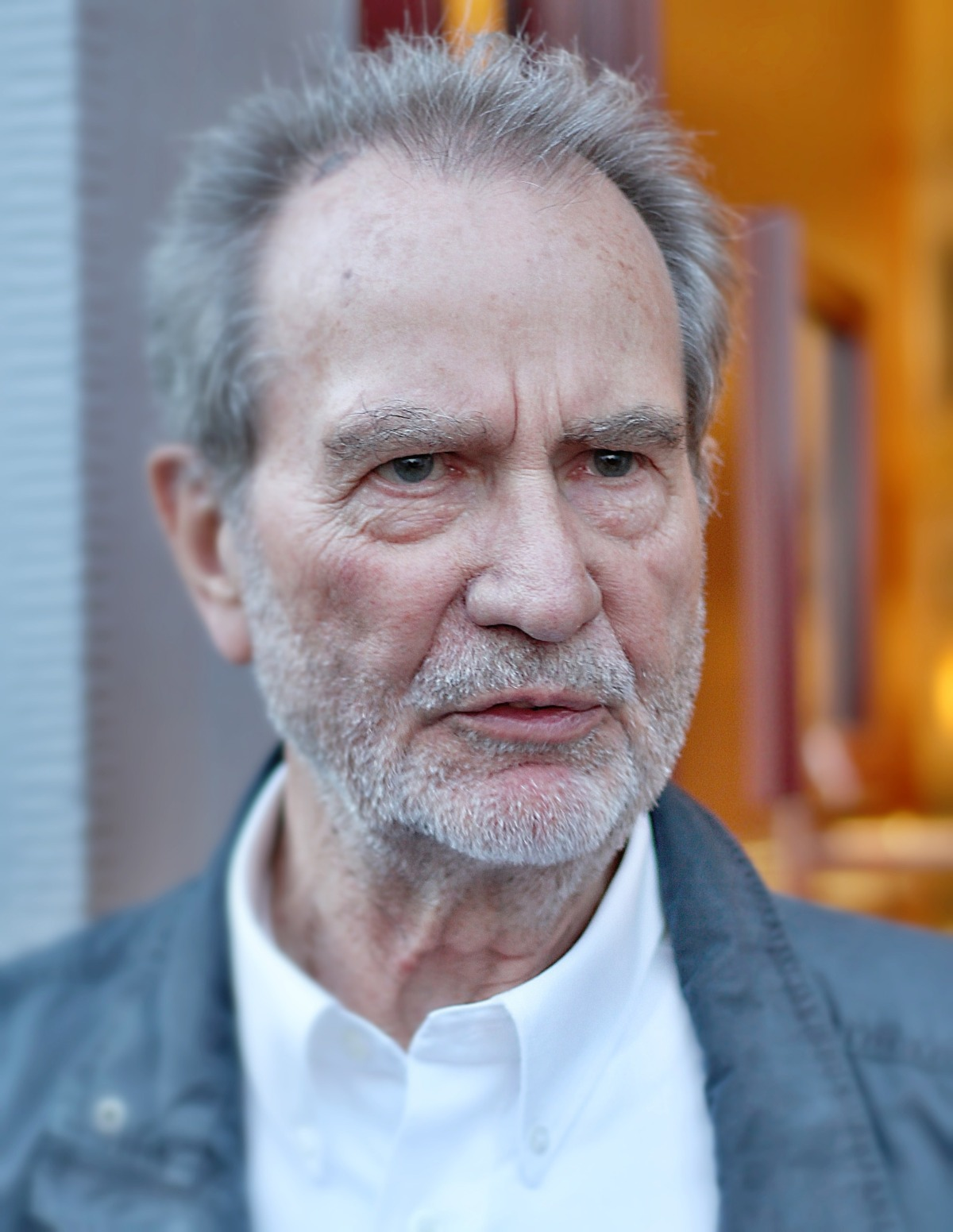
Edgar Reitz recipient of Master of Film Award

- Edgar Reitz, German filmmaker and Professor of Film at the Staatliche Hochschule für Gestaltung (State University of Design) in Karlsruhe

=== Lazio Terra di Cinema Award ===
- Can Yaman, Turkish actor

(awarded by the Lazio Region)
