= Pullen =

Pullen is an uncommon English surname with a purported Norman origin.

"Pullen" is likely an occupational name, arising from the Old French word poulain.

King / Queen

There are several variants of "Pullen", including Pullin, Pullins, Pulleyn, Pullan and Pullein, the latter being the earliest recorded version (1166).

The surname is shared by these notable people:

- Albert J. Pullen (1861–1937), American politician
- Alex Pullin (1987–2020), Australian snowboarder
- Andrew Pullan (1963–2012), New Zealand mathematician
- Ashley Pullen (1956–2002), British speedway rider
- Barry Pullen (1939–2024), Australian politician
- Benjamin Pulleyne, also spelt Pullan (died 1861), Church of England clergyman and schoolmaster
- Cecil Pullan (1910–1970), Indian-born English cricket player
- Clive Pullen (born 1994), Jamaican athlete
- Cyril Pullin (1893–1973), English inventor, engineer and motorcycle race driver
- Daniel Pullen (1885–1923), American football player
- Deborah Pullen (1963–2010), New Zealand female international football (soccer) player
- Don Pullen (1941–1995), American jazz musician
- Eddie Pullen (1883–1940), American racing driver
- Frank Pullen (1915–1992), English businessperson and racehorse owner
- Geoff Pullen (1925–2008), Australian rugby league footballer
- George Pullen (disambiguation), multiple people
- Harriet Pullen (1860–1947), American entrepreneur and hotelier
- Hartley Pullan (1899–1968), World War I flying ace
- Henry Pulleine (bef. 1850–1879), British Army administrator during the Anglo-Zulu War
- Henry William Pullen (1836–1903), English cleric and writer
- Herbert A. Pullen (1874–1938), American orthodontist
- Jacob Pullen (born 1989), American basketball player
- James Pullen (born 1982), English former footballer
- James Henry Pullen (1835–1916), aka "Genius of Earlswood Asylum", British autistic savant
- Joe Pullen (c. 1883–1923), African-American lynching victim
- John Pullen (1901–?), Welsh footballer
- John Pullin (1941–2021), English rugby union player
- Jorge Pullin (born 1963), Argentine-American physics academic
- Josiah Pullen (1631–1714), English vicar
- Julie Pullen, American oceanographer and investor
- Kent Pullen (1942–2003), American politician
- Liam Pullen (born 2005), English snooker player
- Lloyd T. Pullen (1825–1908), American politician
- Lucy Pullen, Canadian artist
- Matilda Marian Pullan (1819–1862), British author
- Melanie Pullen, American photographer
- Melanie Clark Pullen (1975–2022), Irish actress, producer and writer
- Mick Pullen (1921–1969), Australian rules footballer
- Mieke Pullen (1957–2003), Dutch long-distance runner
- Neil Pullen (born 1977), English cricketer
- Noel Pullen (1944–2024), Australian politician
- O'Neal Pullen (1892–1944), American Negro league catcher
- Penny Pullen (born 1947), American politician
- Peter Pullan (1857–1901), English cricket player
- Purv Pullen (1909–1992), American actor
- Randy Pullen, American political activist
- Richard Popplewell Pullan (1825–1888), English architect and archæologist
- Robert Pullen (died c.1150), English theologian and official of the Roman Catholic Church
- Ru Pullan (1916–1993), Australian writer
- Samuel Pullen, Church of Ireland archbishop of Tuam
- Sidney Pullen (1895–1950), English football (soccer) player
- Stacey Pullen, American techno musician
- Tessa Pullan (born 1954), sculptor, equestrian artist
- Thomas G. Pullen (1898–1979), American school superintendent
- Tobias Pullen (1648–1713), Irish bishop
- Tom Pullen (born 1945), Canadian football (gridiron) player
- Vern Pullens (1929–2001), American rockabilly and country singer
- Wally Pullen (1919–1977), English footballer
- Wayne Pullen (born 1945), Canadian archer
- William Pullen "Admiral Pullen" (1813–1887), Royal Navy officer and Arctic explorer
- William Pullen (cricketer) (1866–1937), an English cricket player

== See also ==
- Pullen House, a plantation house in Raleigh, North Carolina
