= One Planet One Future =

Environmental charity in the United States

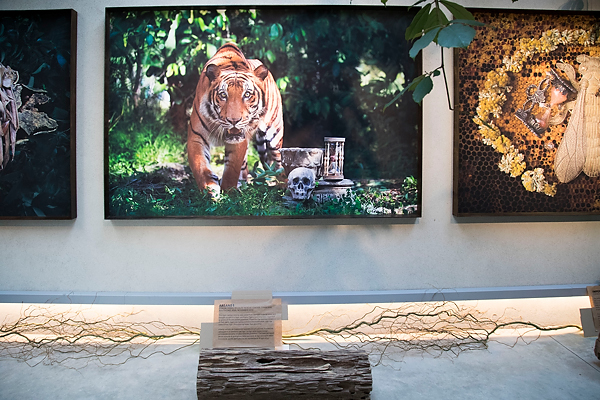
- One Planet One Future exhibition in Milan
- Artist: Anne de Carbuccia
- Condition: Ongoing
- Location: New York and Milan
- Website: oneplanetonefuture.org

One Planet One Future is a US public charity, based in New York and Milan, Italy. The Foundation was established by artist and film director Anne de Carbuccia in 2016. Its mission is to raise awareness on climate breakdown and human-caused threats to the planet and to inspire individual and collective action.

== Origins and development ==
Anne de Carbuccia began conceptualizing One Planet One Future in 2013 on a filming expedition to Antarctica.

Here she made a series of photographs, which inspired the creation of the TimeShrines: installations staged in symbolically significant environments incorporating organic elements and found objects. Each TimeShrine also features an hourglass and a skull as symbols of the transient nature of human existence and the resilience of the earth.

The first TimeShrine installation was created and captured at Lake Powell. Since then, de Carbuccia has travelled all over the world producing more than one hundred images of TimeShrines for her artistic project One Planet One Future, and since then she has travelled all over the world producing more than one hundred images for her artistic project One Planet One Future

In 2016 the project evolved, becoming a Public Foundation in the US. In 2018 the establishment of the Italian Association followed.

Today, One Planet One Future continues to operate in both the US and Italy, with its headquarters in Milan. Through art, education, video and film, it aims to engage people around the world in a discussion of environmental preservation. The foundation harnesses the universal language of art as a means to raise awareness, inspire individual and collective actions, and shift global perspectives towards creating a positive anthropocene.

== Educational project ==
In 2016 the foundation launched an educational project. It was founded on the conviction that education is fundamental to address the environmental crisis by engaging directly with future generations. Recognizing the rights of younger generations, allows for dialogue toe emerge surrounding their key role in devising solutions to protect and save the planet. The learning experience is intended for students from kindergarten through college around the world and is offered free of charge

One Planet One Future offers a variety of in-person and digital educational resources including customized art experiences, film screenings, digital lessons. The digital content, particularly de Carbuccia’s ‘Lessons for the Planet’ continues to expand with the growing importance and demand for digitalization. The lessons recount the key themes of the Anthropocene: water, drought, climate refugees, war, trash, endangered species and cultures. But, they also describe the potential of a positive Anthropocene: wonder, hope, protection, action, love. Additionally, they address educational themes that are becoming increasingly relevant for the school of the future: urban responsibility and the importance of choice, the connections and interconnections between events and between us and the planet. Lessons are available in English and Italian: https://oneplanetonefuture.org/education

== Exhibitions ==
Latest exhibitions:

- Venice, Brun Fine Art - Seargent S.N.A.F.U. - May 5 to Sep 30, 2026
- Turin, Cortile del Rettorato – One Planet One Future – Jun 5 to Aug 30, 2023
- Florence, Brun Fine Art – Palazzo Larderel – One Planet One Future - Jun 11 to Jun 30, 2019
- London, Brun Fine Art – One Planet One Future - Sep 28 to Nov 15, 2018
- Naples, Castel dell'Ovo – One Planet One Future – Jun 23 to Sep 30, 2018
- Moscow, Museum of Modern Art – One Planet One Future – Jun 21 to Sep 10, 2017
- Milano, Ventura Lambrate – One Planet One Future – Mar 30 to Apr 12, 2017
- New York, Westbeth Art Foundation – One Planet One Future – Sep 16 to Nov 21, 2016
- Monaco, Museum of Oceanography – Water at Dusk – Jan 30 to Feb 29, 2016

Permanent Art Centers:

- Milan, Via Conte Rosso 8, 20134 Milan, Italy- Opening in September 2017

== Films ==
In addition to photography and environmental art installations, One Planet One Future produces documentary and short films directed by its founder, Anne de Carbuccia. The foundation's film projects expand its artistic and educational mission, using visual storytelling to highlight the human and ecological consequences of the climate crisis.

In 2023 Earth Protectors premiered, a feature-length documentary on adaptation and the dangers of the Anthropocene. The film has been screened internationally in schools, museums, and cultural institutions, and is used as an educational tool within the foundation's educational program.

In 2024, Refugia, where life will persist was released. This is a short film exploring the theme of climate displacement and the loss of habitats and cultures threatened by global warming.

Most recently, the five-part documentary series Choose Earth released its final episode on Earth Day 2026. This series was filmed across a pivotal decade: 2014-2024. It had its world premiere at the Rome Film Fest and its international premier at Black Nights Film Festival (PÖFF). All five episodes; ‘Our Legacy’, ‘World Wide Web’, ‘Blue Print’, ‘Island of Coherence’, and ‘Children of the Anthropocene’ are currently available to stream on Amazon Prime Video.

All films produced by the foundation serve as visual testimonies of the Anthropocene, reflecting its core purpose: to inspire awareness and collective action for the preservation of the planet.

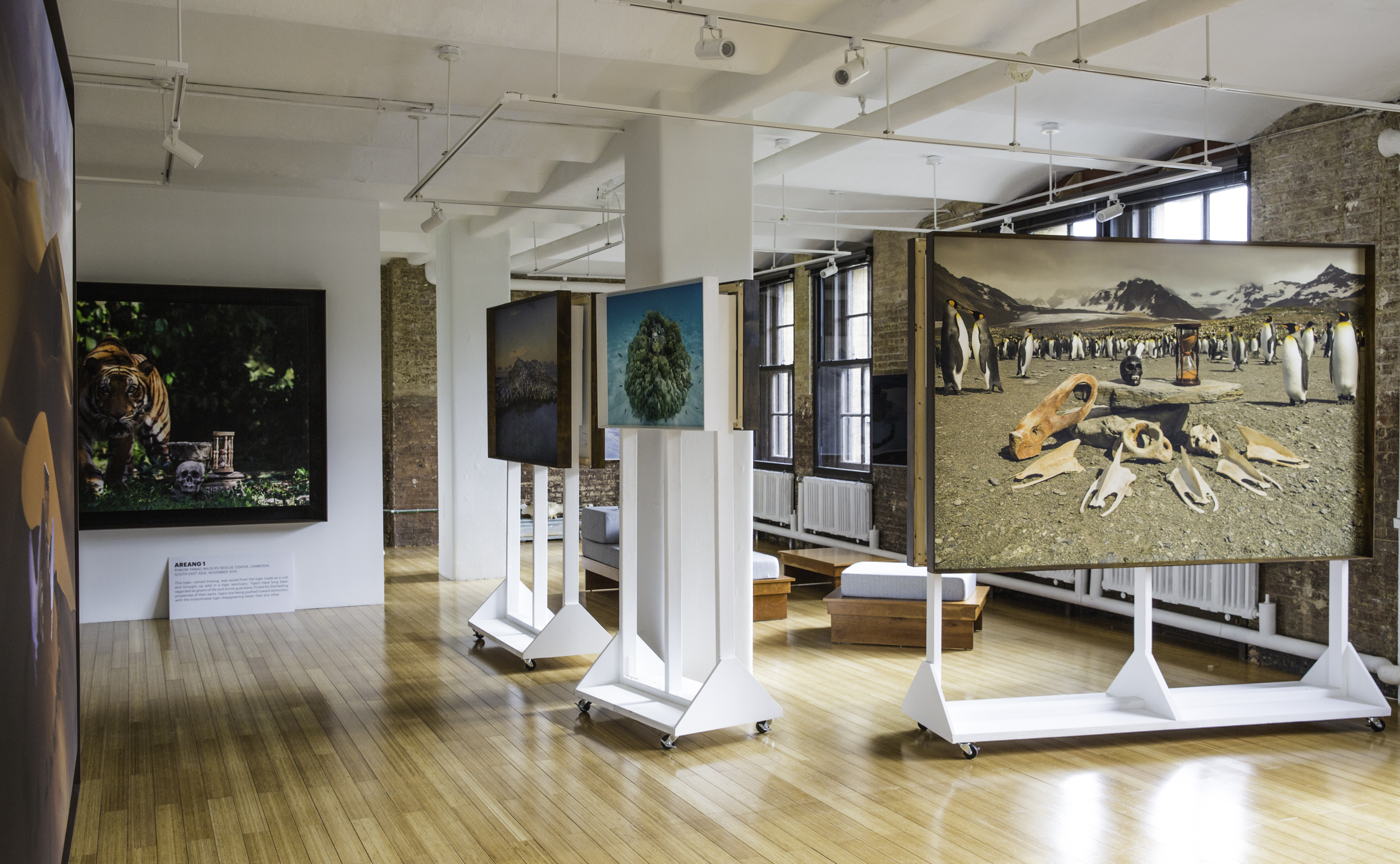
One Planet One Future Art Center in New York
