= Vanitas =

Genre of symbolic art

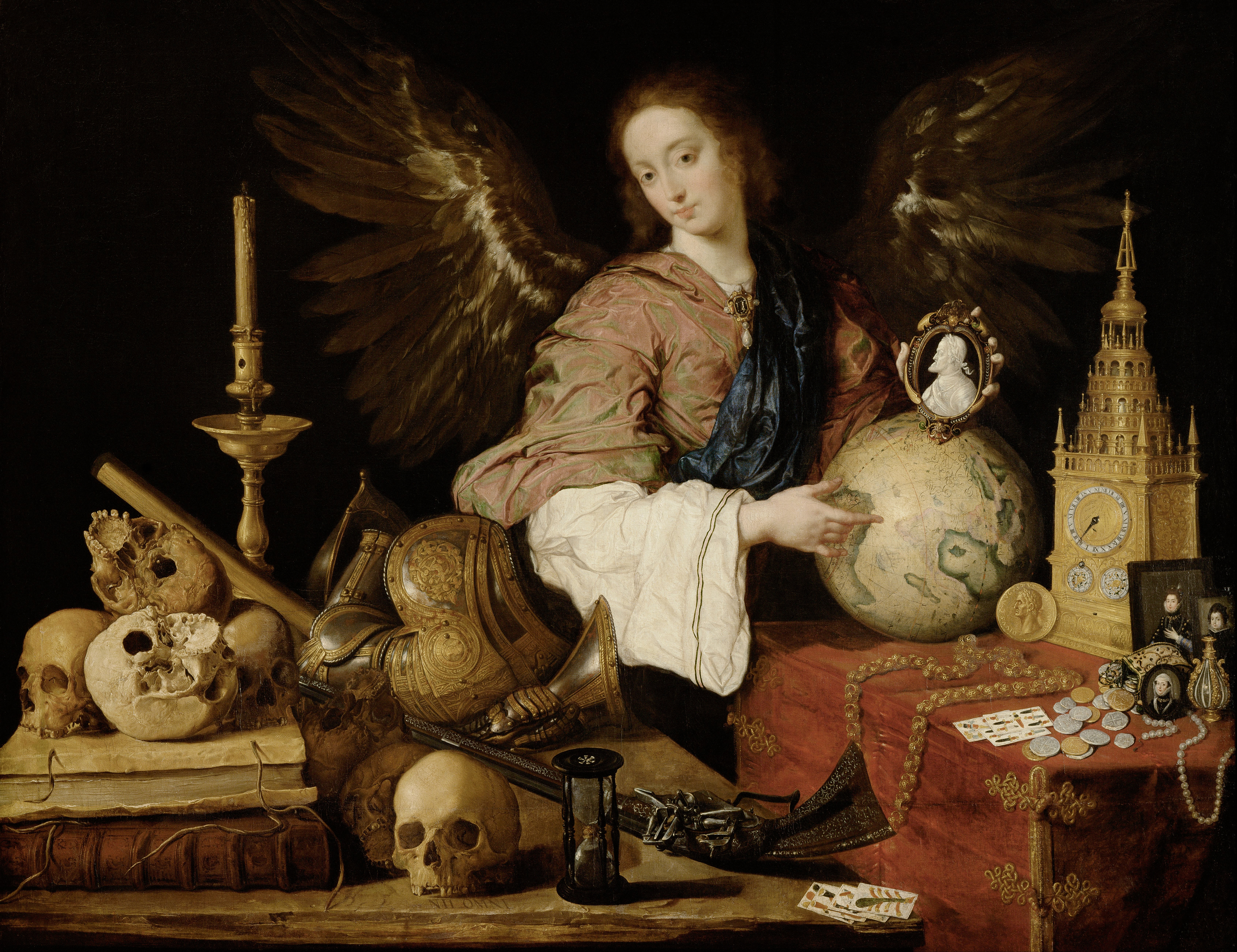
Vanitas by Antonio de Pereda

Vanitas (Note: from Latin meaning 'vanity', in this context meaning pointlessness, or futility, not to be confused with the other definition of vanity) is a genre of memento mori symbolizing the transience of life, the uselessness of pleasure, and the certainty of death, and thus the vanity of ambition and all worldly desires. The paintings involved still life imagery of transitory items. The genre began in the 16th century and continued into the 17th century. Vanitas art is a type of allegorical art representing a higher ideal. It was a sub-genre of painting heavily employed by Dutch painters during the Baroque period (c.1585–1730). Spanish painters working at the end of the Spanish Golden Age also created vanitas paintings.

== Etymology ==
The word vanitas comes from Latin and means vanity. In this context, vanity means pointlessness, or futility, not to be confused with the other definition of vanity. Vanity is referenced in the Hebrew Bible in Ecclesiastes 1:2, "Vanity of Vanities, saith the preacher, all is vanity". In some versions vanity is translated as "meaningless" to avoid the confusion with the other definition of vanity, that being inflated pride in oneself or one's appearance. The message is that human action is temporary and faith is forever. Memento mori is a similar theme which when translated from Latin means, "remember that you will die."

== History ==
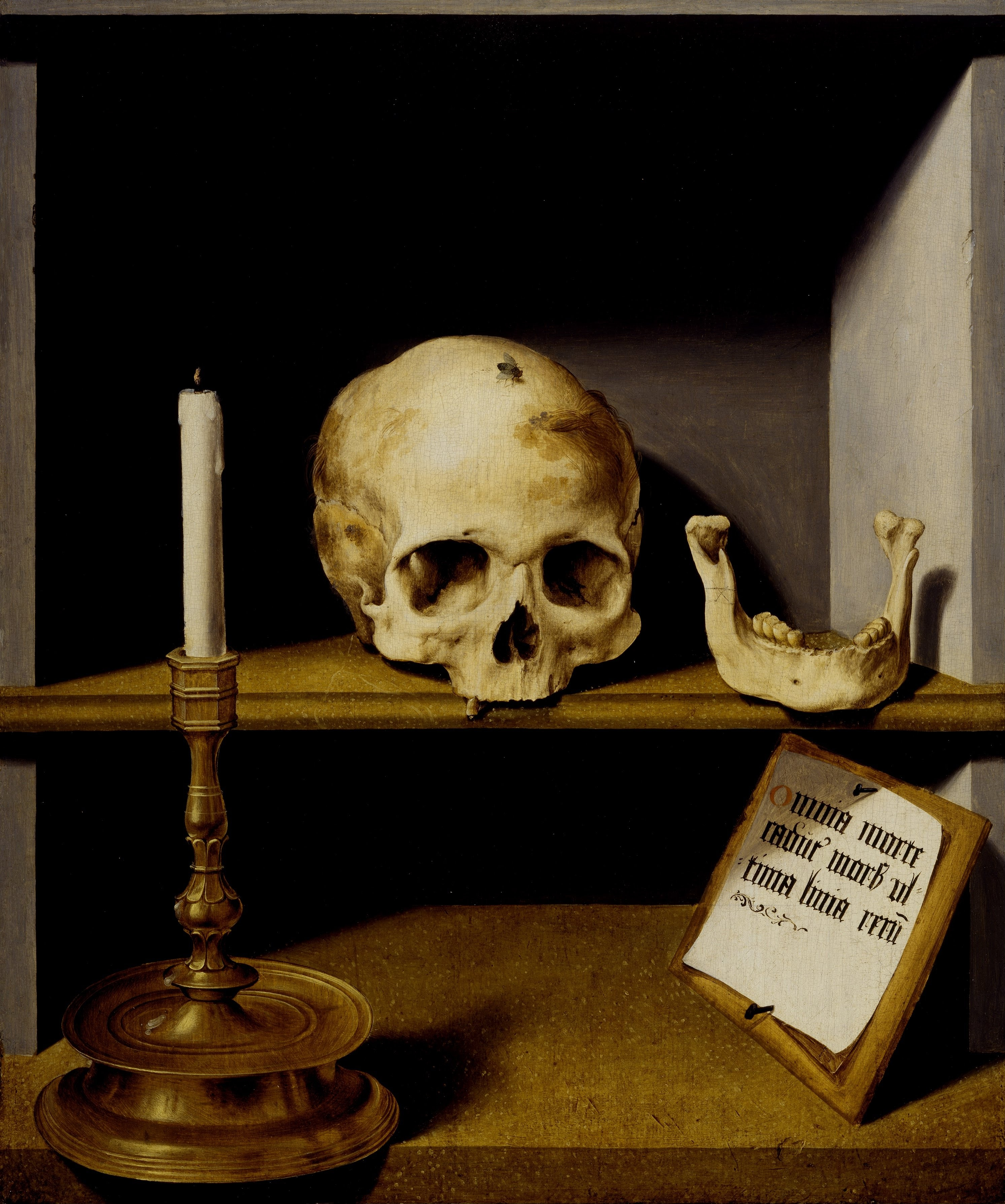
Vanitas by Bartholomaeus Bruyn the Elder (1524) with the text "Omnia morte cadunt, mors ultima linia rerum" (transl. "Everything passes in death/Death is the ultimate limit of all things").

A group of painters in Leiden began to produce vanitas paintings in the beginning of the 16th century and they continued into the 17th century. Vanitas art is an allegorical art representing a higher ideal or containing hidden meanings. Vanitas are formulaic and use literary and traditional symbols to convey mortality. Vanitas often have a message that is rooted in religion or the Christian Bible.

In the 17th century, the vanitas genre was popular among Dutch painters. The paintings often have symbolic imagery which attempts to convey the message that all people die, encouraging the viewer to think about the futility of earthly pursuits. The well-known Spanish vanitas refer to Spain's rulers and the politics of Spain. It was popular to include skulls in vanitas paintings as a symbol of the ephemeral nature of life.

== Outside visual art ==
- The first movement in composer Robert Schumann's 5 Pieces in a Folk Style, for Cello and Piano, Op. 102 is entitled Vanitas vanitatum: Mit Humor. (Note: Vanitas vanitatum: Latin, 'vanity of vanities')
- Vanitas vanitatum is the title of an oratorio written by Italian Baroque composer Giacomo Carissimi (1605–1674).
- Vanitas is the seventh album by British extreme metal band Anaal Nathrakh.
- Vanitas is the name of a character from the Kingdom Hearts franchise.
- Vanitas is the name of one of the two main characters from Vanitas no Carte.
- Vanitas is the motto of The Harvard Lampoon.

== In modern times ==
- Jana Sterbak, Vanitas: Flesh Dress for an Albino Anorectic, artwork, 1987.
- Alexander de Cadenet, Skull Portraits, various subjects, 1996 – present.
- Matthias Laurenz Gräff, various paintings of Vanitas and Memento mori, 2017 – present.
- Philippe Pasqua, series of skulls, sculpture, 1990s – present.
- Anne de Carbuccia, One Planet One Future, various subjects, 2013 – present.
- Alexander James Hamilton, underwater Vanitas series, analogue photography, 2010–present.
- Vivian van der Merwe, contemporary Vanitas painting, juxtaposing 17th century iconography and 21st century artefacts, 2020-present.

== See also ==
- Memento mori
- Mortality salience
- Pronkstilleven
- Sic transit gloria mundi
