= The Winter Lake =

2020 film directed by Phil Sheerin

- Directed by: Phil Sheerin
- Written by: David Turpin
- Release date: 2020
- Countries: Ireland; Canada
- Language: English

The Winter Lake is a 2020 Irish-Canadian mystery drama film, written by David Turpin and directed by Phil Sheerin.

== Plot ==
Tom is an introverted and troubled young man living with his struggling mother Elaine, the pair having just moved into a house that they have inherited. They have come from a distressing family background. Tom explores the nearby 'turlach', a winter lake fed by a mysterious and dangerous intermittently flowing underground river. He finds a dreadful relic in the water. He has a Stanley knife. Elaine needs the help of her neighbour, Ward, who jealously watches over his daughter Holly, a manipulative young woman who picks up on Tom. Holly intuits that Tom has found the relic. Ward will do anything to prevent people from knowing about the relic. Holly steers Tom towards killing Ward.

== The winter lake ==
The words 'winter lake' in the title of the movie refer to a particular kind of water course that occurs in parts of Ireland, called in Irish a 'turlach'. Holly uses that Irish term in the movie.

== Cast ==
- Emma Mackey as Holly
- Anson Boon as Tom
- Charlie Murphy as Elaine
- Michael McElhatton as Ward
- Mark McKenna as Col
- Maria McDermottroe as Tessie
- Ally Ní Chiaráin as Peggy
- Mark Duffy as Darren
- Conor Hamill as Fergal
- Michael Roper as Ged
- Penny Robinson as Joan
- Jordan McGuinness as Eoin
- Gillian Quinn, Ciaran McHugh, Chris Price, Anto Brennan, Ewa Chameliec, Martin Treacy, Miniver Lee McLoughlin & Tarrach Loughrey all appear as extras.

== Reception ==
On the review aggregator website Rotten Tomatoes, 74% of 23 critics' reviews are positive, with an average rating of 5.90/10.
