= Sergeant S.N.A.F.U. =

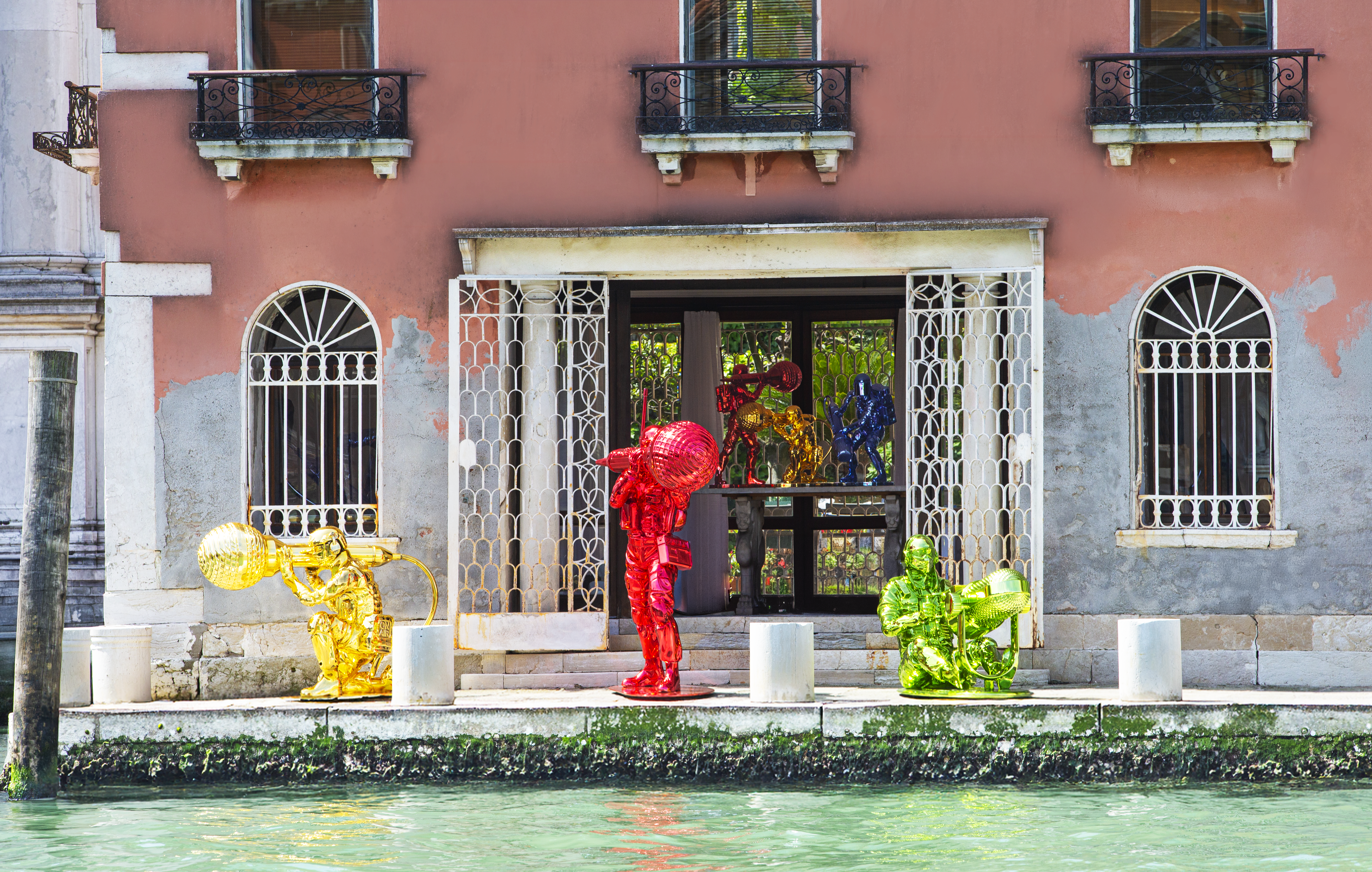
The S.N.A.F.U. soldiers exhibited on the Canal Grande, Venice

Sergeant S.N.A.F.U. is an artistic project by Anne de Carbuccia composed of four sculptures.

Each statue represents a toy soldier holding a microphone, instead of a weapon. The soldiers exist in three sizes: small, medium and large, the large one is life-size.

The sculptures are made through 3D printing, and then coloured and chromed, to give them a shining effect.

Sergeant S.N.A.F.U. was exhibited for the first time at Venice in 2026, next to the Ponte dell'Accademia (Accademia Bridge).

== Artwork's meaning ==
The statues show soldiers, whose weapons are microphones, to shed light on the role of information and journalism in relation to armed conflicts. On one side, they represent the danger reporters face when in war zones and on the other, the problem of disinformation.

The project name, Sergeant S.N.A.F.U., comes from SNAFU, a military acronym that means "Situation Normal, All Fucked Up", expressing a paradox..

The soldiers' figures are inspired by toy soldiers, recalling another paradox between children's innocence and the brutality of war. The chrome finish, as well, wants to attract the viewer and work as a mirror to reality.

== Technique ==
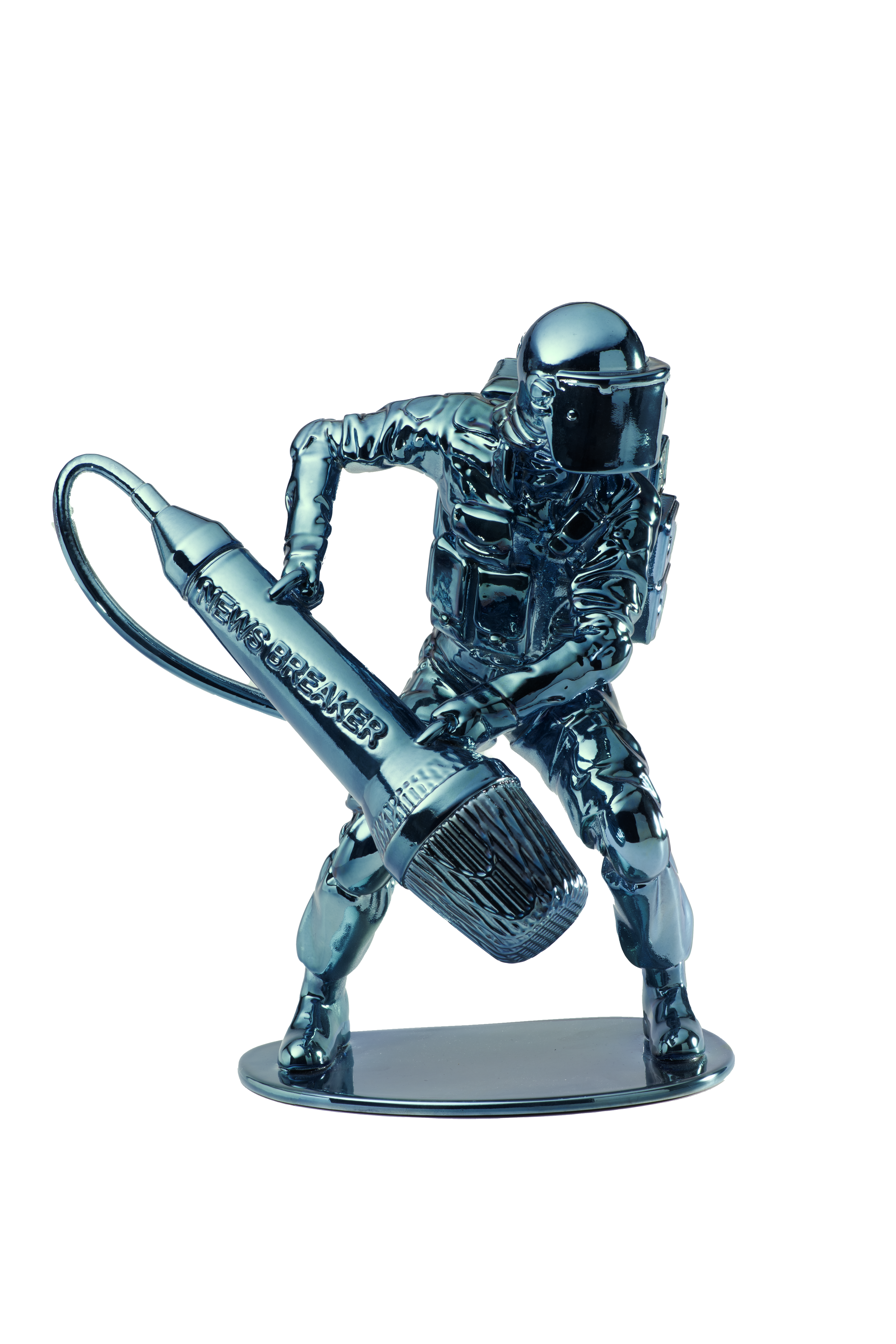
Blue soldier

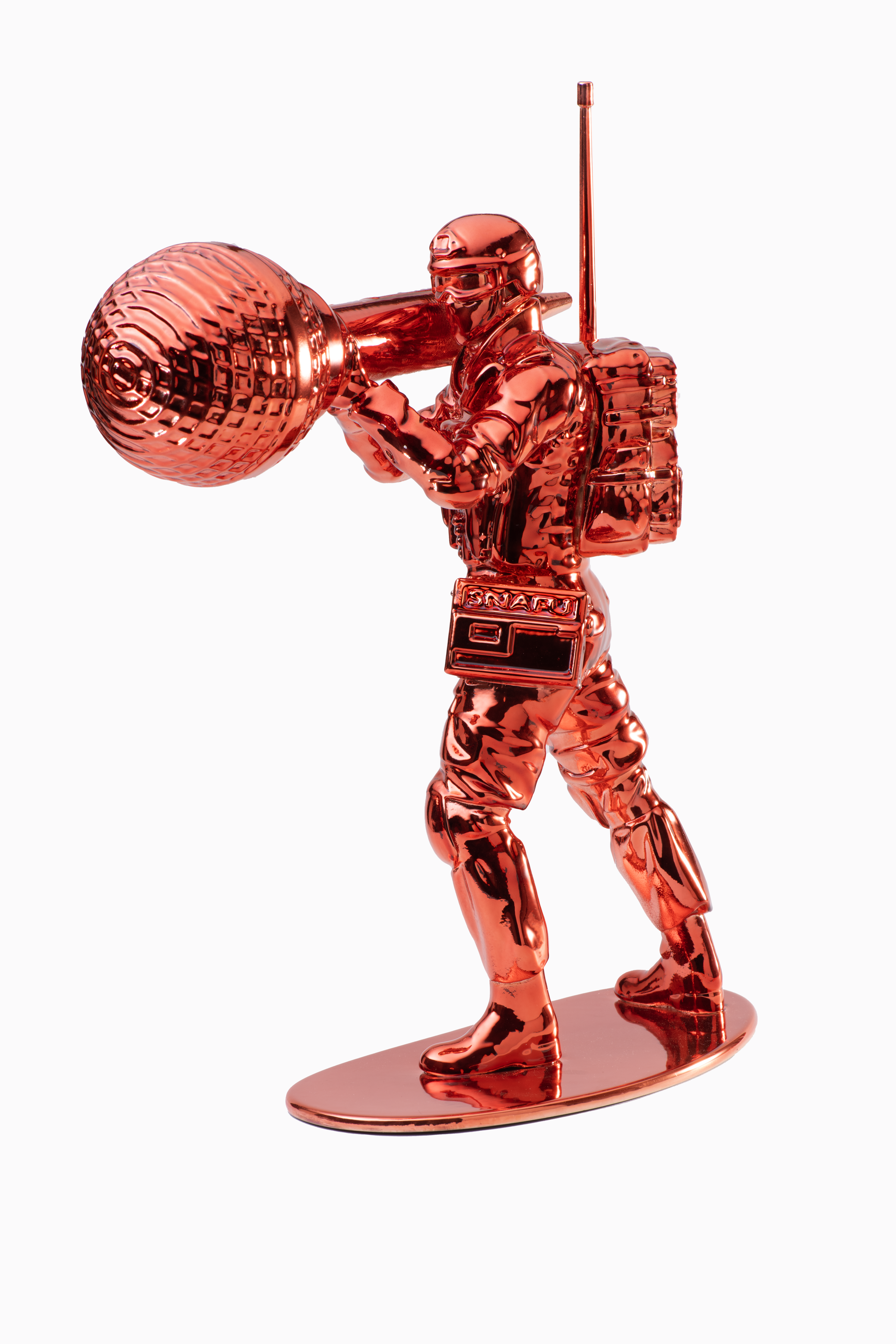
Red soldier

The Sergeant S.N.A.F.U. series is made of four sculptures, each one portraying a soldier holding, in different ways, an out-of-proportion microphone:

- Red soldier: the red-chromed statue is a soldier standing and holding a microphone over their shoulder.
- Gold soldier: the gold-chromed statue is a kneeling soldier, who is also holding a microphone over their shoulder.
- Blue soldier: the blue-chromed statue is a standing soldier who is holding a microphone as if it were a battering ram.
- Green soldier: the green-chromed statue is a sitting soldier that is about to shoot from a microphone-shaped bazooka.

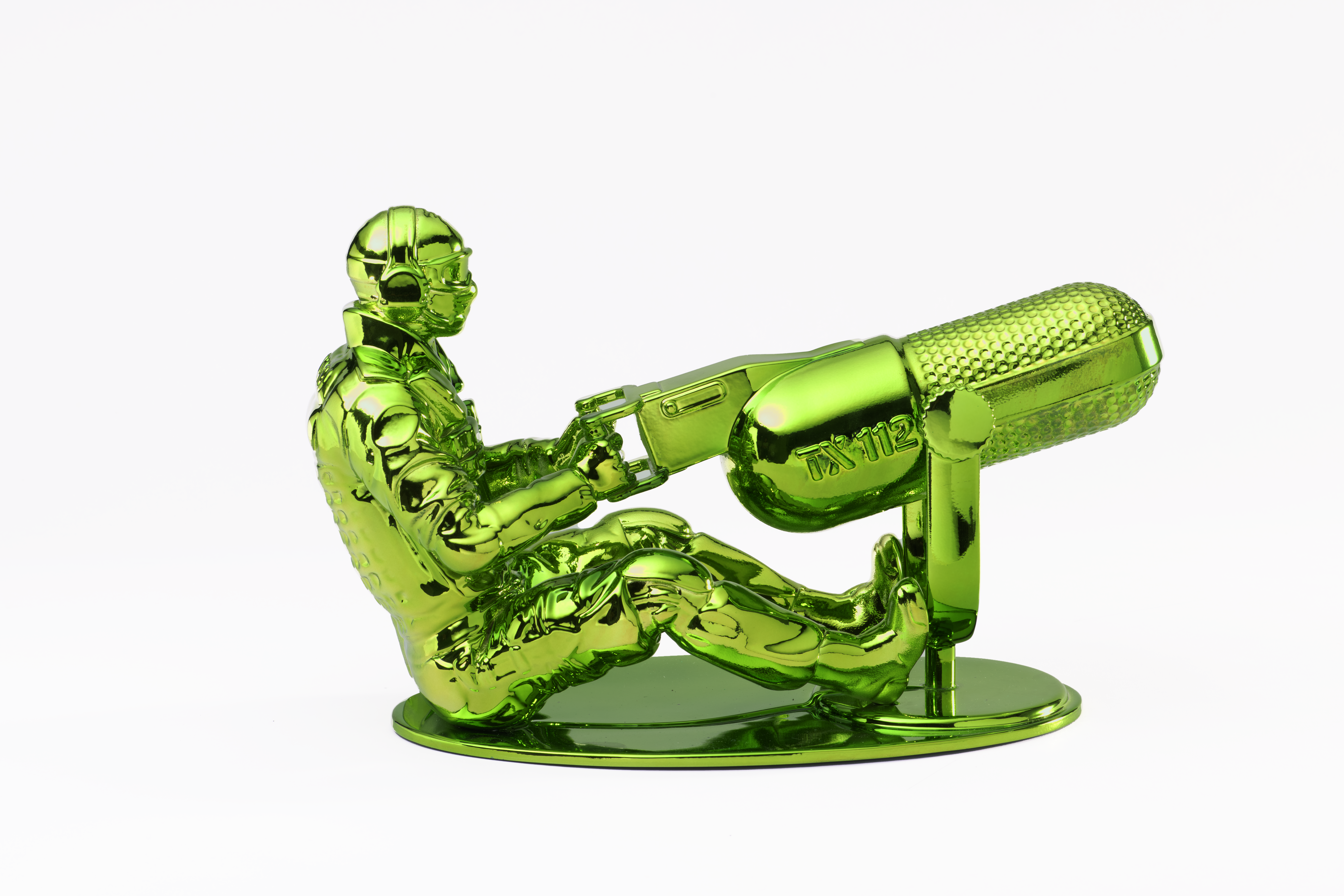
Green soldier

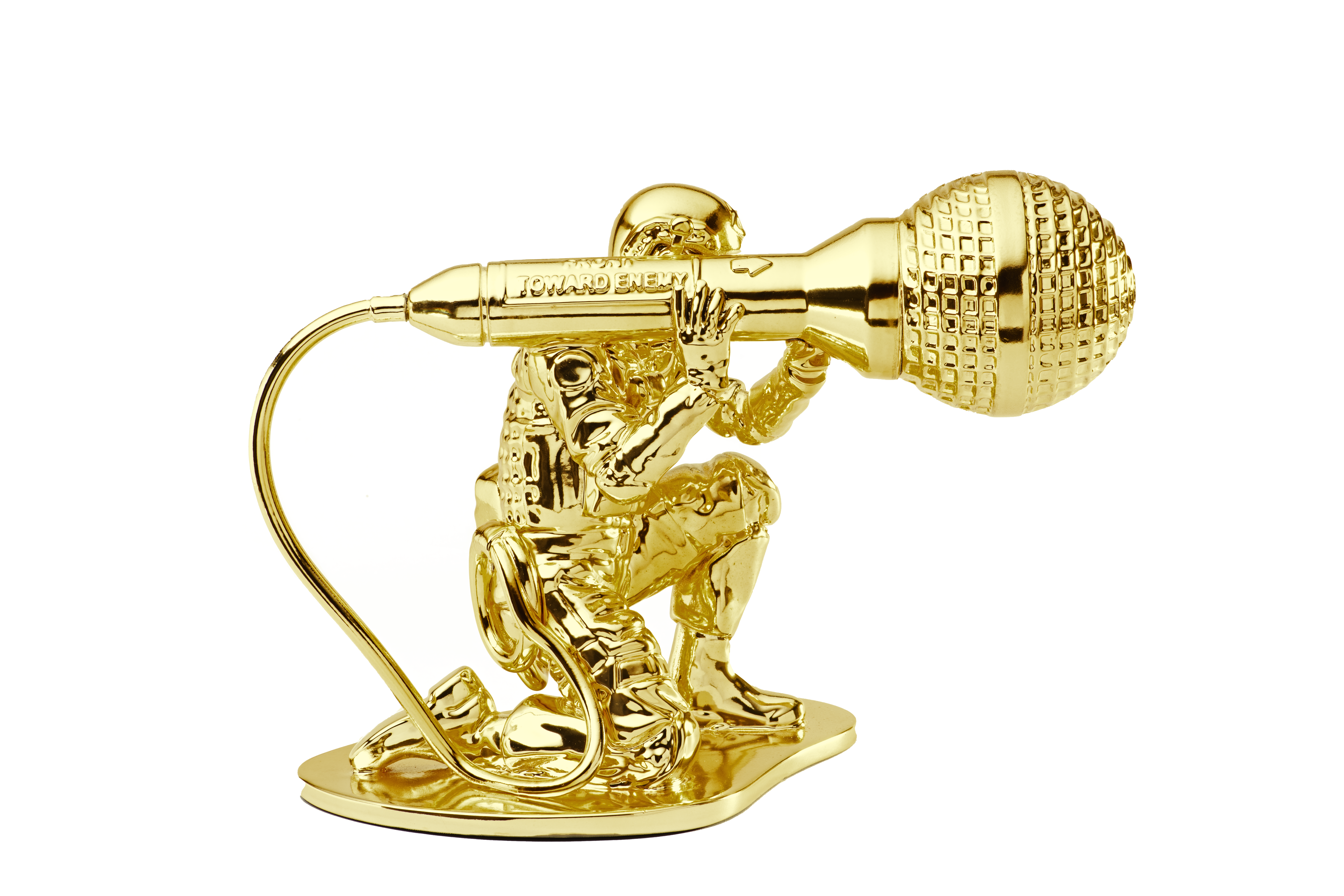
Gold soldier

Each sculpture has the inscription "S.N.A.F.U.", and some also have other writing on their microphones or military gear, for example: "Point towards enemy" or "On air". The sculptures were made in the sizes: small, medium and large.

They were all 3D printed; the large and medium ones are in acrylonitrile butadiene styrene (ABS) and made with a fused deposition modeling (FDM) technique, the small ones are in resin and made with stereolithography (SLA) technique.

The chroming and colouring process was entirely handmade.

== Press ==
Some press mentions the project and its 2026 Venice exhibition:

Sky News

- ArtTribune
- WWD
- Il Giornale dell'Arte (The Art Newspaper)
- Il Sole 24 Ore
- Io, Chiara e il Green (Rai IsoRadio)
- Il Messaggero
- Le Petit Journal
