= Illusione =

2025 film by Francesca Archibugi

- Directed by: Francesca Archibugi
- Written by: Francesca Archibugi; Laura Paolucci; Francesco Piccolo
- Produced by: Domenico Procacci
- Starring: Jasmine Trinca; Michele Riondino; Angelina Andrei; Vittoria Puccini
- Production companies: Fandango; Tarantula Belgique; Rai Cinema
- Distributed by: 01 Distribution
- Release date: 25 October 2025 (Rome)
- Running time: 110 minutes
- Countries: Italy; Belgium

Illusione (transl. Illusion) is a 2025 drama film co-written and directed by Francesca Archibugi. It stars Jasmine Trinca, Michele Riondino, Angelina Andrei, and Vittoria Puccini. It premiered at the 20th Rome Film Festival on 25 October 2025.

== Cast ==
- Jasmine Trinca as Cristina Camponeschi
- Michele Riondino as Stefano Mangiaboschi
- Angelina Andrei as Rosa Lazar
- Vittoria Puccini
- Francesca Reggiani
- Aurora Quattrocchi
- Filippo Timi

== Production ==
The film was announced in February 2025, with Francesca Archibugi directing. Principal photography began in Perugia in March 2025. Filming lasted for eight weeks.

== Release ==
The film premiered at the 20th Rome Film Festival on 25 October 2025.
