= Good Boy (2025 Komasa film) =

2025 film by Jan Komasa

- Film poster
- Directed by: Jan Komasa
- Written by: Bartek Bartosik; Naqqash Khalid
- Produced by: Jeremy Thomas; Ewa Piaskowska; Jerzy Skolimowski
- Starring: Stephen Graham; Andrea Riseborough; Anson Boon; Kit Rakusen
- Cinematography: Michał Dymek
- Edited by: Agnieszka Glińska
- Music by: Abel Korzeniowski
- Production companies: Recorded Picture Company; Skopia Film
- Distributed by: Signature Entertainment
- Release dates: 5 September 2025 (TIFF); 20 March 2026 (United Kingdom)
- Running time: 110 minutes
- Countries: Poland; United Kingdom
- Language: English
- Box office: $1,185,371

The Good Boy (previously named Good Boy and also known as Heel) is a 2025 black comedy thriller film directed by Jan Komasa. It stars Stephen Graham, Andrea Riseborough, Anson Boon, and Kit Rakusen. It tells the story of a married couple who abduct a 19-year-old criminal and try various methods to rehabilitate him. The film had its world premiere at the 50th Toronto International Film Festival on 5 September 2025.

== Plot ==
19-year-old Tommy is a foul-mouthed, drug-abusing delinquent with a penchant for antisocial behaviour and violence, both of which he records and uploads to his Instagram account. During a night out with his girlfriend Gabby, Tommy becomes heavily intoxicated and is separated from his friends. He is then abducted on the street by an unknown assailant.

Rina, a Macedonian woman, meets with a man named Chris to interview for a housekeeping job. Later, at his large countryside home in Yorkshire, she signs a non-disclosure agreement and is given a tour of the house, meeting Chris's reclusive wife, Kathryn, and their 10-year-old son, Jonathan. While viewing the cellar downstairs, Rina discovers Tommy chained to the wall. She attempts to flee but Chris reveals he is aware of her past and precarious visa situation. Following a threat to call his contact in the Home Office, Rina reluctantly agrees to take the job.

Chris forces Tommy to watch educational films as well as old videos of Tommy's antics uploaded online. Tommy initially maintains his antisocial demeanour, to which Chris responds with lectures and kindness, claiming that he is trying to help Tommy become a better person, though he shows no reluctance in beating or tasering Tommy whenever he resists his captivity.

As time passes, Kathryn begins giving Tommy books to read and the family allows him to watch movies with them. His temperament calms and he slowly builds a rapport with everyone in the household, especially Jonathan. After celebrating Tommy's birthday with an outdoor picnic, Chris moves him to a room upstairs, having constructed a ceiling-mounted track system to which Tommy's chain is attached, allowing him to move throughout the house, but they are rigged with combination locks to prevent Tommy from going downstairs unsupervised.

Rina confides in the family that she is being followed, and they invite her to move into the house. Tommy and Rina help Chris arrange a romantic dinner for Kathryn in the garden. Tommy takes a knife from the kitchen drawer when the family is distracted and hides it in a potted plant. One day, when Chris goes on a drive, a gang of men, who turn out to be members of Rina's family, force their way into the house. She agrees to leave with them, providing Tommy with the code to his locks before doing so. Tommy attacks the men, but they overpower him.

When Chris returns home, he thanks Tommy for protecting their family and reveals his plan to install a security system and motion detectors on the property. That night, Tommy opens the combination locks and sneaks downstairs, taking the hidden knife and using it to pry his chain from the track. Chris goes downstairs with a handgun but Tommy attacks him from behind and disarms him just as Kathryn arrives. Tommy asserts he will never be the person who used to live in his room and demands to go free. Kathryn pleads for Tommy to stay, mistakenly calling him Sparkle in the process. It can be inferred that is the name of a deceased child and the cause for the abduction of Tommy. Heartbroken in her husband's arms, Kathryn agrees to let Tommy leave.

Having returned home, Tommy does not admit to police that he was abducted, instead claiming he went away with his friend 'Jonathan'. He encounters Gabby in a nightclub, heavily intoxicated from drugs and alcohol. She confesses the next day that she wishes she could 'disappear', and Tommy asks if she trusts him. When she assents, he incapacitates her with chloroform and takes her to the gate of Chris's home. After Tommy rings the buzzer and waits anxiously, the gate opens and he walks towards the house with Gabby in his arms.

== Cast ==
- Stephen Graham as Chris
- Andrea Riseborough as Kathryn
- Anson Boon as Tommy
- Kit Rakusen as Jonathan
- Monika Frajczyk as Rina
- Savannah Steyn as Gabby
- Mila Jankowska as Lindsay
- Callum Booth-Ford as Ste
- Noah Valentine as Jack
- Noah Manzoor as Mikey
- Maciej Stepniak as Klement
- Jessica Johnson as a police officer
- Austin Haynes as a young boy
- Helena Calvert as Helen

== Themes and genre ==
According to the lead actors, the film intentionally defies strict genre categorization, blending elements of grounded British social realism with a surreal, almost European sensibility. While the narrative's high-concept premise involves a dysfunctional family chaining a young man in their basement, Andrea Riseborough noted that the film's true core theme is an exploration of grief. To ground their performances, both actors engaged in extensive discussions with the director to establish a concrete, hidden backstory for their characters. However, these specific origins were deliberately left ambiguous in the final film to allow for subjective audience interpretation.

== Production ==
Producer Jerzy Skolimowski approached director Jan Komasa with the film's screenplay while the latter was promoting his 2019 film, Corpus Christi. The screenplay, originally written in Polish and set in Warsaw, was adapted into English and set in Yorkshire to appeal to a wider audience. It is Komasa's first English-language film.

Principal photography took place in Yorkshire and Warsaw, and was completed in October 2024.

=== Acting process ===
Stephen Graham developed his character's distinct physical movements and gait independently. As part of his acting method, Graham physically tests various postures at home and relies heavily on finding the right pair of shoes for the character to physically ground himself in the role. Riseborough also highlighted the performance of their on-screen son, Kit Rakusen, noting his significant growth and maturity as an actor during the intense production.

=== Filming ===
The production involved highly intense and emotional indoor shoots. According to Graham and Riseborough, the pivotal picnic scene stood out as a significant moment during production, as it was the only day the entire principal cast filmed together outside. Despite heavy winds complicating the shoot, Graham described it as his favorite day on set due to the contrasting sense of freedom it provided the cast.

== Release ==
A promotional clip was released on 3 September 2025. The film had its world premiere in the Centerpiece section of the 50th Toronto International Film Festival on 5 September 2025. It was also screened at the BFI London Film Festival and the Rome Film Festival.

The film will be released by Kino Świat in Poland. In November 2025, it was acquired for distribution by Magnolia Pictures in the United States; Signature in the United Kingdom and Ireland; X Verleih in Germany, Austria, and Switzerland; Minerva Pictures in Italy; YouPlanet/Caramel Films in Spain; Sundae in Japan; 18k Films in the Benelux; Front Row Films in the Middle East; Pris Audiovisuais in Portugal; Shaw Organisation in Singapore; Beta Film in Bulgaria; The Film Group in Greece; Catchplay in Taiwan; and Bir Film in Turkey.

== Reception ==
On the review aggregator website Rotten Tomatoes, 88% of 72 critics' reviews are positive, with an average rating of 6.9/10. The website's consensus reads: "Having a maniacally fun time while wrestling with provocative questions about rehabilitation, Heel is a nutty thriller that has a surprising amount of method to its madness." Metacritic, which uses a weighted average, assigned the film a score of 63 out of 100, based on 18 critics, indicating "generally favorable" reviews.

Damon Wise of Deadline wrote, "Like an early Yorgos Lanthimos, the strangeness of the premise does a lot of heavy lifting, but the performers literally bring character to what might easily have been a one-note movie." Christopher Llewellyn Reed of Film Festival Today noted that the film "pleasantly surprises in the way it spins out its story threads," adding that "there is more to Tommy than we originally thought, and more to the movie, too," even if "some of it strains credulity." Pavel Snapkou of Showbiz by PS described the film as "an insanely interesting story with a rather sad ending," praising its "fantastic" setup and performances while arguing that the finale "throws away everything that was built in the first half of the film".
