= Blackbird (2019 film) =

2019 American drama film

- Official poster
- Directed by: Roger Michell
- Screenplay by: Christian Torpe
- Based on: Silent Heart; 2014 Danish film by Christian Torpe
- Produced by: David Bernardi; Sherryl Clark; Rob Van Norden
- Starring: Susan Sarandon; Kate Winslet; Mia Wasikowska; Lindsay Duncan; Rainn Wilson; Bex Taylor-Klaus; Sam Neill
- Cinematography: Mike Eley
- Edited by: Kristina Hetherington
- Music by: Peter Gregson
- Production companies: Magna Entertainment; Busted Shark Productions; SF Studios; Millennium Films
- Distributed by: Screen Media Films
- Release dates: September 6, 2019 (TIFF); September 18, 2020 (United States)
- Running time: 98 minutes
- Country: United States
- Language: English
- Box office: $1.8 million

Blackbird is a 2019 American drama film directed by Roger Michell and written by Christian Torpe. It is a remake of the 2014 Danish film Silent Heart, also written by Torpe. It stars Susan Sarandon, Kate Winslet, Mia Wasikowska, Lindsay Duncan, Rainn Wilson, Bex Taylor-Klaus, and Sam Neill. A family of three generations gather over a weekend to say goodbye to its matriarch Lily, who has an incurable disease. With the help of her husband Paul, Lily has chosen to pursue euthanasia when the weekend is over. But as the end approaches, their mother's decision becomes more and more difficult to handle for her two daughters, and old conflicts resurface.

Blackbird had its world premiere at the Toronto International Film Festival on September 6, 2019. It was released on September 18, 2020, by Screen Media Films.

== Plot ==
Lily and Paul invite their three-generation family to their seaside home over a weekend. Anna and her partner Chris arrive late, and it soon becomes apparent that she is estranged.

Trying to connect with her sister, Jennifer helps Anna in her room, asking her why she hasn't responded to various family events. Chris has to be introduced around as everyone doesn't know her. Jennifer asks Anna about dancing, which she has quit, she then lists all the other pursuits she's quit like acupuncture, quilting and yoga which their parents have paid for. Anna also is critical of Jennifer's husband Michael, and likewise Jennifer disapproves of Anna bringing her on and off again Chris and of Lily's long-time friend Liz's presence.

Everyone is there to say goodbye to Lily, who has an incurable disease, and with the help of her husband Paul has chosen to pursue euthanasia when the weekend is over. In the meantime, they do crossword puzzles, play charades, etc.

The next morning, the grandson Jon asks his grandfather how they will euthanise Lily. As euthanasia is illegal in the state, although in reality Paul is going to give her the lethal dose, he's going to tell them on the 911 emergency phone line that she must have taken it while he was on a walk. Although Jon sees her as still okay, Paul explains that Lily is very likely go downhill fast, so she must do it while her arm still works.

At breakfast, although it is summer, Lily suggests they do an early Christmas, assigning different people tasks. First, they all go for a walk, and she shows them where Jennifer was conceived, hence why she and Paul ended up buying the land and building the house there. When Anna asks, her conception story is ordinary.

As her end approaches, their mother's decision becomes more and more difficult to handle for her daughters Jennifer and Anna. Anna tells Chris she is going to call 911 to prevent the procedure, who isn't too supportive of this. In the kitchen, as they're preparing the meal, Jen finds the pentobarbital.

As Jon hangs the ornaments for Lily, he asks for life advice, which she attests elders are no wiser. When she presses for him to tell her his hidden desire, he admits he'd like to become an actor.

Over dinner, Lily gives each of them a piece of jewelry important to her, as well as a novelty tie for Michael and a dildo for Jen. Jon's parents show how controlling they are of him, disapproving when he says he wants to be an actor, he is offered wine and Lily pulls out pot.

When Lily proudly talks about each of them, after she declares she raised two strong, independent women, Anna declares they're both messed up and that she herself had been institutionalised for attempted suicide. Lily is suddenly very tired, and goes to bed.

Chris pulls Jen aside, explaining Anna's suicide attempt and that she is bipolar. When she tells her Anna plans to call 911 to thwart the euthanasia, Jen confronts her sister and talks her out of it. However, downstairs Jen sees Paul and Liz embracing. She stays up all night, scouring over photo albums and realises Liz has been with them on all family trips.

In the morning, although Lily wants them to have a lazy Sunday, Jen gets Anna to back her in announcing they will block the euthanasia by calling 911. Trying to get Paul or Liz to confess, Lily tells everyone it was her idea, as she doesn't want either to be lonely.

Lily gets everyone on board with the procedure, but Jen and Anna insist on being with Paul at her side while she drinks the medication. Afterwards they drive off, one by one.

== Cast ==
- Susan Sarandon as Lily
- Kate Winslet as Jennifer
- Mia Wasikowska as Anna
- Sam Neill as Paul
- Lindsay Duncan as Liz
- Rainn Wilson as Michael
- Bex Taylor-Klaus as Chris
- Anson Boon as Jonathan

== Production ==
The remake was announced in July 2018, with Kate Winslet, Diane Keaton and Mia Wasikowska cast to play members of the family. Roger Michell was announced as director, with filming initially set to begin in August.

Filming began in October, with Keaton replaced by Susan Sarandon, and Sam Neill, Rainn Wilson, Bex Taylor-Klaus and Lindsay Duncan cast in supporting roles. The beachside house used in the film is located next to Winslet's own home near West Wittering in West Sussex, with the South Coast of England doubling for The Hamptons.

== Release ==
The film had its world premiere at the Toronto International Film Festival on September 6, 2019. In May 2020, Screen Media Films acquired distribution rights to the film. It was released on September 18, 2020.

== Reception ==
On Rotten Tomatoes, the film has an approval rating of 63% based on reviews from 102 critics. The site's critics consensus states: "Blackbird wastes its premise on shallow storytelling, though its splendid cast adds heart to a sensitive subject." On Metacritic, the film has a weighted average score of 53 out of 100, based on reviews from 18 critics, indicating "mixed or average" reviews.
