= Franco Pinna =

Italian photographer (1925–1978)

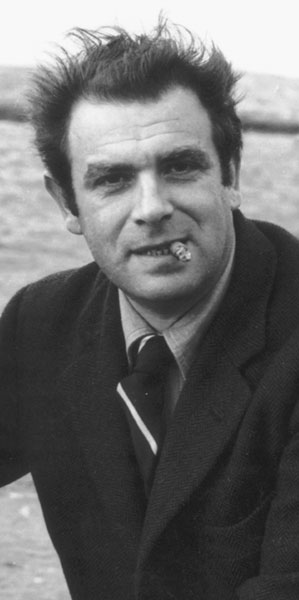

Franco Pinna (1925–1978) was an Italian photographer of the second half of the 20th century and one of the main representatives of neorealism. He developed his work in black and white.

== Brief history ==
He was born in La Maddalena, on July 29, 1925. In 1952 he moved to Rome and, after a brief experience as a cinedocumentary operator, constituted the cooperative Fotografi Associati together with Plinio De Martiis, Caio Mario Garrubba, Nicola Sansone, Pablo Volta, which was dissolved in 1954 due to economic difficulties. He followed the anthropologist Ernesto De Martino during several research expeditions in southern Italy (Lucania, 1952, 1956, 1959, Salento 1959), obtaining documents of great artistic and cultural value. In 1959 he published his first book, entitled La Sila, which was followed by Sardegna una civiltà di pietra (Sardinia, a stone civilization) (1961). Meanwhile, his photos appear in the magazines Life, Stern, Sunday Times, Vogue, Paris Match, Epoca, L'espresso, Panorama. From 1965 Pinna became the trusted photographer of Federico Fellini and made scene photos of his films Giulietta degli spiriti, 1965, up to Fellini's Casanova in 1976; he also publishes some photo books (I Clowns, Fellini's Film) inspired by his films. He died suddenly in Rome on April 2, 1978.

== In popular culture ==
In 2025, the 20th Rome Film Festival will celebrate Pinna's birth centenary, by presenting his work in three parallel exhibitions titled "Franco Pinna Photographer. Tribute to a Century." Curated by Paolo Pisanelli and organized by Archivio Franco Pinna and OfficinaVisioni, the exhibitions will be showcased in key festival venues, in collaboration with Cinema del reale, Erratacorrige, and Big Sur. The official poster of the festival is also a shot taken by him on the set of Federico Fellini's 1965 fantasy comedy-drama film, Juliet of the Spirits.
