= Anson Boon =

English actor (born 2000)

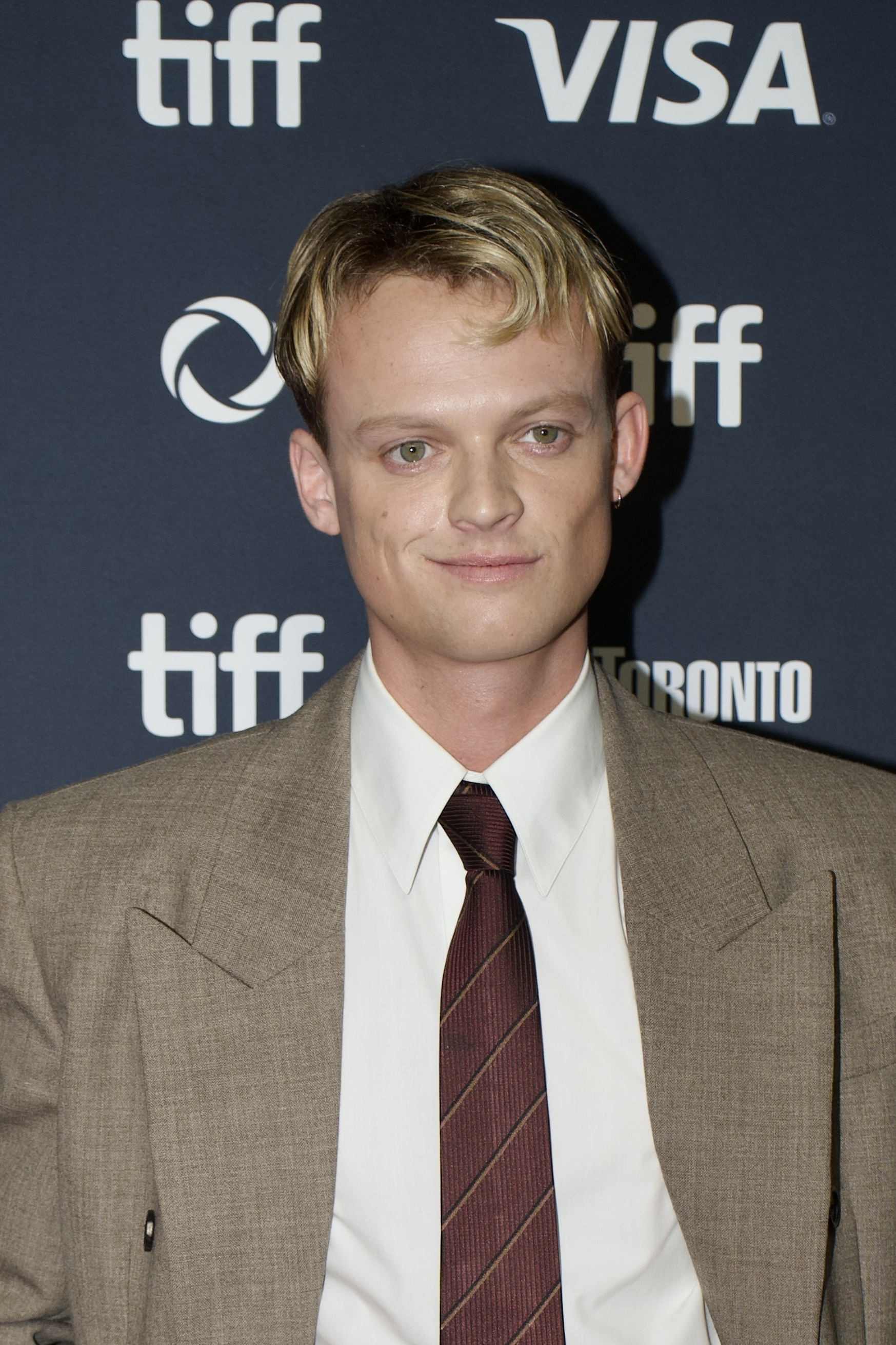
- Boon at the 2025 Toronto International Film Festival
- Born: 15 February 2000 (age 26); Peterborough, England
- Occupation: Actor
- Years active: 2014–present

Anson Boon (born 15 February 2000) is an English actor. His films include The Winter Lake (2020), Widow Clicquot (2023) and Good Boy (2025). On television, he is known for his roles in the Disney+ series Pistol (2022) and the Paramount+ series MobLand (2025–).

== Early life ==
Anson Boon was born on 15 February 2000 in Peterborough, England. His father is an amateur DJ, originally from a farming family, and his mother is from a working-class London family. He has a younger brother. He dropped out of college to pursue acting professionally, choosing not to attend drama school.

== Career ==
Boon made his professional acting debut in the children's sitcom All at Sea in 2014. In 2019, he had roles in the films Blackbird and 1917, and was named a Screen International Star of Tomorrow. The following year, he starred in his first lead role in the mystery drama film The Winter Lake alongside Emma Mackey. In 2022, he played Johnny Rotten in the biographical miniseries Pistol, directed by Danny Boyle.

== Personal life ==
Boon is a supporter of the Premier League football club Tottenham Hotspur. He has named Harry Kane as his favourite player.

== Acting credits ==
Key
†	Denotes films that have not yet been released

=== Film ===
Year	Title	Role	Ref.
2019	Crawl	Stan	
2019	Blackbird	Jonathan	
2019	1917	Private Cook	
2020	Sulphur and White	Young David	
2020	The Winter Lake	Tom	
2023	Widow Clicquot	Edouard	
2025	Good Boy	Tommy	
TBA	Halftime Hero †	Steve "Pringle" Davies	

=== Television ===
Year	Title	Role	Notes	Ref.
2014	All at Sea	Troy Milne	1 episode	
2018	Endeavour	Brett Nero	1 episode	
2018	The Alienist	Paresis Hall Boy #5	2 episodes	
2019	Living the Dream	Louis	1 episode	
2019	The Feed	Anton Garin	4 episodes	
2020	The Defeated	Young Moritz	6 episodes	
2022	Pistol	Johnny Rotten	6 episodes	
2025–present	MobLand	Eddie Harrigan	10 episodes	

=== Theatre ===
Year	Title	Role	Theater	Ref.
2019	"Master Harold"...and the Boys	Hally	Royal National Theatre	
