= Earth Protectors =

2023 documentary film about climate change

- Directed by: Anne de Carbuccia
- Written by: Anne de Carbuccia; Luigi Montebello
- Produced by: Max Brun (Executive producer); Stefano Curti (Associate Executive producer)
- Cinematography: Luigi Montebello
- Edited by: Luigi Montebello
- Music by: Filippo Manni; Massimo Perin
- Distributed by: Minerva Pictures Internationals
- Release date: 2023
- Running time: 96 minutes
- Countries: Italy; United States
- Languages: English, Italian, French, Spanish, Japanese

Earth Protectors is a 2023 documentary film directed by Anne de Carbuccia, addressing the subject of climate change. The film features contributions from young activists and insights from Dr. Julie Pullen, an earth scientist.

== Synopsis ==
Earth Protectors explores the effects of human activities on nature, with particular attention to phenomena such as wildfires, flooding, pollution, and pandemics. The documentary showcases the work of individuals engaged in environmental preservation, referred to as "Earth Protectors". Their efforts span various initiatives, including drought mitigation, coral reef conservation, and the protection of the Amazon rainforest. Additionally, the film discusses social issues connected to environmental changes, such as climate refugees and the role of the youth in environmental activism.

== Cast ==
Earth Protectors

- Mariasole Bianco, Marine Biologist and Founder of Worldrise, Italy
- Tashi Bista, Humanitarian, Upper Mustang, Nepal
- Jared Cairuna Cauper, Shipibo Tribal Ranger, Peruvian Amazon
- Dasha Filippova, Eco-counselor, Lake Baikal, Siberia
- Liliana Rodriguez Cortes, Community Advocate, Yucatán, Mexico
- Maxim Savchenko, Activist, Lake Baikal, Siberia
- Alexandria Villaseñor, Climate Activist, California,

Scientists

- Roberto Ambrosini, Microplastic Specialist, Italy
- Julie Pullen, Earth Scientist and Oceanographer, NYC, US

== Reviews ==
"Earth Protectors" received reviews from media outlets such as Film Threat, GhMovieFreak, Film Obsessive, Reviewron, Women's Wear Daily, EcoWatch Le Petit Journal, and Lifegate.
