= Julie Pullen =

American oceanographer, investor and public figure

- Dr. Julie Pullen, oceanographer and meteorologist, in Hudson River Park, New York City.
- Education: Santa Fe Institute; Macalester College; Oregon State University
- Scientific career
- Workplaces: Stevens Institute of Technology
- Thesis: Modeling studies of the coastal circulation off northern California (2000)

Julie Pullen is an American oceanographer and investor who is the former director of the National Center for Maritime Security. She was named by Bloomberg News as one of the 2024 "Climate Leaders to Watch".

== Early life and education ==
Pullen studied physics and mathematics at Macalester College. She was an undergraduate intern at Santa Fe Institute. Pullen completed her doctoral research at Oregon State University. Her research looked to model coastal circulation in the oceans around California. She moved to Stanford University as a science fellow in 2003.

== Research and career ==
At the United States Naval Research Laboratory, Pullen developed strategies to improve forecast capabilities. She pioneered the use of the ocean-atmosphere mesoscale modeling system (COAMPS), and used it to model the downslope Bora. In 2004, Pullen moved to Columbia University as a Marie Tharp Fellow.

In 2011, Pullen was made director of the United States Department of Homeland Security National Center for Maritime Security. She was appointed a professor of civil engineering at Stevens Institute of Technology in 2015, where she worked on oceans, weather and fluid flow. She led the Maritime Security Lab, where she concentrated on coastal sustainability challenges. She used research cruises and simulations to better understand ocean circulation and extreme weather events.

Pullen spent 2018 as a Fulbright Scholar in the Philippines. She developed multi-modal forecasting techniques that combined air, sea, land and river models to better predict flooding and landslides.

Pullen is the founding director of Propeller Ventures, an early stage fund that looks to support projects that protect the oceans and climate.

In 2024, Bloomberg named Pullen as one of their "Climate Leaders to Watch". She features in the film Earth Protectors, which explored how climate change was impacting communities around the world.

== Selected publications ==
- Signell, Richard; Carniel, Sandro; Cavaleri, Luigi; Jacopo Chiggiato; James D. Doyle; Julie Pullen; Mauro Sclavo (2005). "Assessment of wind quality for oceanographic modelling in semi-enclosed basins". Journal of Marine Systems. 53 (1–4): 217–233. Bibcode:2005JMS....53..217S. doi:10.1016/j.jmarsys.2004.03.006. Wikidata Q57634772.
- Craig M. Lee; Farid Askari; Jeff Book; et al. (2005). "Northern Adriatic response to a wintertime bora wind event". Eos. 86 (16): 157. Bibcode:2005EOSTr..86..157L. doi:10.1029/2005eo160001. Wikidata Q57442279.
- Irina I. Rypina; Lawrence J. Pratt; Julie Pullen; Julia Levin; Gordon, Arnold (2010). "Chaotic Advection in an Archipelago". Journal of Physical Oceanography. 40 (9): 1988–2006. Bibcode:2010JPO....40.1988R. doi:10.1175/2010jpo4336.1. Wikidata Q58410148.
