= Mick Pullen =

Australian rules footballer

Personal information
- Full name: Michael Henry Pullen
- Born: 7 January 1921; North Melbourne, Victoria
- Died: 26 October 1969 (aged 48); Camberwell, Victoria
- Original team: West Melbourne
- Height: 185 cm (6 ft 1 in)
- Weight: 84 kg (185 lb)

Playing career^{1}
Years	Club	Games (Goals)
1943, 1946	North Melbourne	4 (1)
- ^{1} Playing statistics correct to the end of 1946.

Michael Henry Pullen (7 January 1921 – 26 October 1969) was an Australian rules footballer who played with North Melbourne in the Victorian Football League (VFL).

== Family ==
The son of Frank Brougham Pullen (1887–1958), and Margaret Jane Hilda Pullen (1890–1947), née Molloy, Michael Henry Pullen was born at North Melbourne, Victoria on 7 January 1921.

He married Dorothy Woods (1922–2015) on 24 July 1943.

== Football ==
=== North Melbourne (VFL) ===
Recruited from West Melbourne in the Sub-District League.

=== RAAF ===
In 1943, he was playing for a RAAF team in Sydney.

== Military service ==
Pullen served in both the Australian Army, and the Royal Australian Air Force, during World War II.

=== KH210 ===
He was seriously injured when the Liberator bomber (KH210) in which he was the co-pilot was ditched in the Bay of Bengal, in flames, while returning to its base at Salboni, during a bombing raid on Rangoon in May 1945.

The plane's observer, Wing Commander J.B. Nicholson VC died. Pullen and one of his crew, nose gunner Flight Sergeant Eric Leslie Kightley (RAF 1480397) — neither of whom had any memory of the moment that the plane hit the water — were rescued by separate Air/Sea Rescue US Catalinas after clinging to the wreckage for 14 hours in the water. Both were hospitalized in Calcutta and treated for their injuries and attendant shock.
