= Anne de Carbuccia =

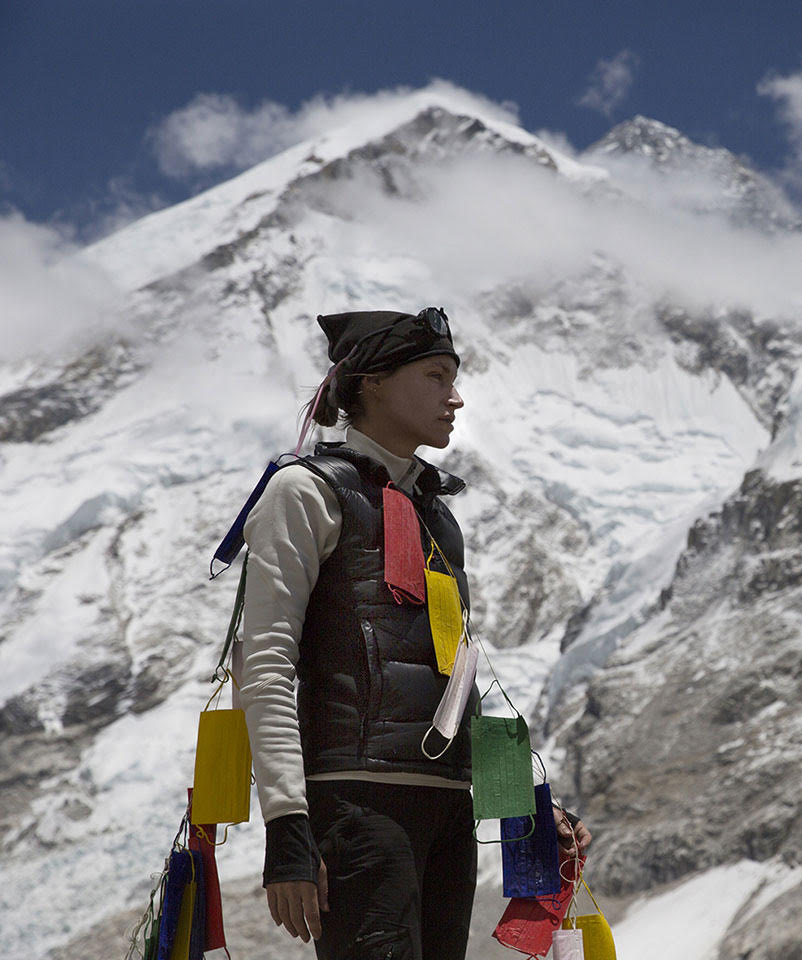
- de Carbuccia at Mount Everest in 2016
- Born: July 26, 1968 (age 58); Cooperstown, New York, U.S.
- Education: Columbia University
- Known for: Environmental art
- Notable work: One Planet One Future art project
- Website: www.oneplanetonefuture.org

Anne de Carbuccia is a French-American environmental artist, photographer, film director and world traveler. In 2016, she founded the One Planet One Future foundation to raise awareness on the climate crisis.

== Early life and education ==
Anne de Carbuccia was born July 26, 1968 in Cooperstown, New York. She is originally from Corsica, France.

Anne de Carbuccia was a student of Anthropology and Art History at Columbia University. Throughout her studies she developed an interest in the concept of human beings as a new geological force: the Anthropocene.

== Climate crisis photography and art ==
De Carbuccia has been traveling the world, developing her artistic project to raise awareness of the climate crisis. On her expeditions, she documents the environmental degradation she encounters in the forms of changing habitats, disappearing animal species and cultures.

In 2013, she began a series of photographs, which inspired the creation of the TimeShrines: installations staged in symbolically significant environments incorporating organic elements and found objects. Each TimeShrine also features an hourglass and a skull as symbols of the transient nature of human existence and the resilience of the earth.

She draws inspiration from 16th- and 17th-century vanitas art and meticulously creates time shrines reminiscent of still-life paintings of that period, which generally featured a skull and an hourglass. “These are symbols of time, not death, and I build shrines to time. They are static installations in a natural lively environment,” she explains, pointing to the transient nature of human existence and the resilience of the earth."

— Luisa Zargani

In January 2016, De Carbuccia excited her TimeShrines at the Museum of Oceanography in Montecarlo, titled Water at Dusk, - This was a precursor to a larger art event that followed in September of the same year at the Westbeth Art Gallery in New York. In 2016, de Carbuccia established One Planet One Future: a public charity centered on raising awareness of human caused threats to the environment through art and educative missions.

== Film and television ==
Carbuccia shifted from photography to filmmaking, writing and directing with her first short film One Ocean. The film had its world premiere at the 75th Venice International Film Festival in September 2018.

De Carbuccia's feature-length documentary film, Earth Protectors, was released in 2023. The narrative recounts the stories of seven young Earth Protectors around the world from Siberia to the Amazon, who are living on the front lines of our changing planet. The film urges us to reflect on our relationship with the environment and transform the notion of the Anthropocene into a positive geological force.

In June 2024 her 16 min docu-fiction Refugia, where life will persist, had its Italian premiere at CinemAmbiente in Torino. Refugia takes place in Japan and is a poetic narrative which recounts the science of habitats that for millennia facilitated the survival of life on our planet.

Choose Earth, released in 2025, filmed between 2014 – 2024, had its world premiere at the Rome Film Fest and its international premier at Black Nights Film Festival (PÖFF). The series conveys the importance of societal change towards a positive Anthropocene. The series is currently streaming on Amazon Prime Video.

Most recently, de Carbuccia has created a new sculpural series titled Sergeant S.N.A.F.U. which was presented at the Venice Biennale in May of 2026. The series focuses on the power of information and the dangers of its use today as an instrument of warfare.

== Personal life ==
Anne de Carbuccia lives and works between Milan and New York City.

== Exhibitions ==
One Planet One future exhibitions are organized around the world and are open to the public free of charge.

Latest exhibitions:

- Venice, Brun Fine Art - Sergeant S.N.A.F.U. - May 5 to Sep 30, 2026
- Turin, Cortile del Rettorato – One Planet One Future – Jun 5 to Aug 30, 2023
- Florence, Brun Fine Art – Palazzo Larderel – One Planet One Future - Jun 11 to Jun 30, 2019
- London, Brun Fine Art – One Planet One Future – Sep 28 to Nov 15, 2018
- Naples, Castel dell'Ovo – One Planet One Future – Jun 23 to Sept 30, 2018
- Moscow, Museum of Modern Art – One Planet One Future – Jun 21 to Sept 10, 2017
- Milano, Ventura Lambrate – One Planet One Future – Mar 30 to Apr 12, 2017
- New York, Westbeth Art Foundation – One Planet One Future – Sep 16 to Nov 21, 2016
- Monaco, Museum of Oceanography – Water at Dusk – Jan 30 to Feb 29, 2016
