= Choose Earth =

TV documentary series directed by Anne de Carbuccia

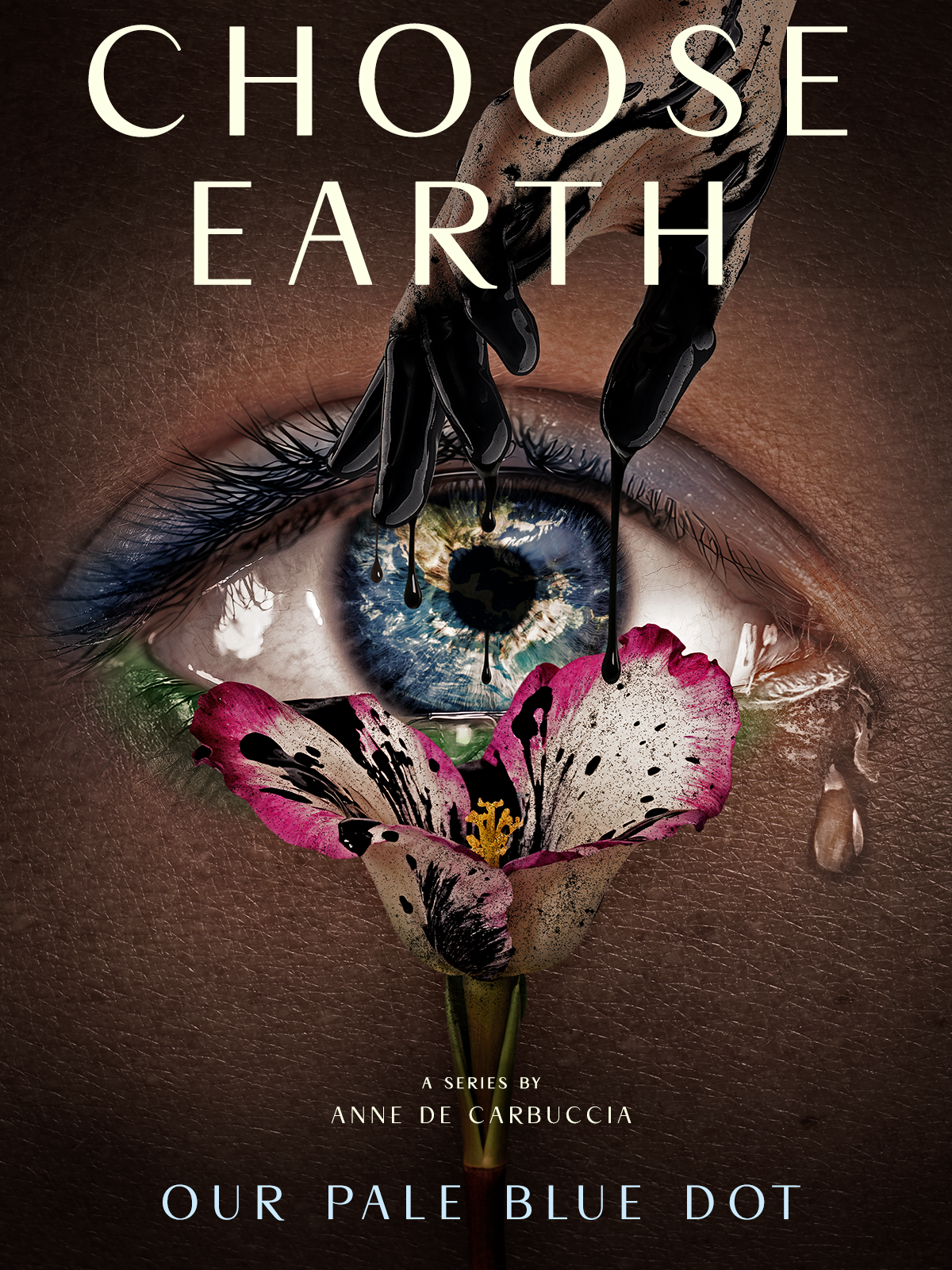
- Genre: Documentary
- Written by: Anne de Carbuccia, Luigi Montebello
- Directed by: Anne de Carbuccia
- Countries of origin: Italy; United States
- Original language: English
- No. of seasons: 1
- No. of episodes: 5

Production
- Producer: One Planet One Future Foundation

Original release
- Network: Amazon Prime Video
- Release: 2025

Choose Earth is a TV series directed by Anne de Carbuccia, filmed between 2014 and 2025, all around the world. The series is a five-episode documentary on the challenges of the last decade regarding the climate crisis.

== Synopsis ==
The series features men and women committed to the protection of planet Earth that artist Anne de Carbuccia met while creating her artistic installations across the world. These people are called by the artist and director "Earth Protectors", due to their efforts to care for the planet and for local and indigenous cultures. The series documents anthropologically the 2014 to 2024 decade, with a focus on adaptation, cultural legacy and the damages caused by pollution and the climate breakdown.

Each episode delves into a specific topic: from cultural loss in the Himalayas due to climate breakdown, to youth movements in the Global North.

== Cast ==
- Tashi Bista, Humanitarian, Upper Mustang, Nepal
- Jared Cairuna Cauper, Shipibo Tribal Ranger, Peruvian Amazon
- Ettie Mikita, Works with Sustainable Start-ups, Estonia
- Liliana Rodriguez Cortes, Community Advocate, Yucatán, Mexico
- Jóvenes por Xcalak, Youth Group Working to preserve Yucatán's Sea Environment
- Mariasole Bianco, Marine Biologist and Founder of Worldrise, Italy
- Roberto Ambrosini, Microplastic Specialist, Italy
- Dasha Filippova, Eco-counselor, Lake Baikal, Siberia
- Maxim Savchenko, Activist, Lake Baikal, Siberia

== Episodes ==
=== Episode 1: Our Legacy ===
Anne de Carbuccia explores the Himalayas, in Nepal's remote Upper Mustang, where climate breakdown is a threat to the local culture. There, she meets humanitarian Tashi Bista, who is active in the protection of the land and culture.

The episode dives in climate challenges, such as droughts and floods, that threaten communities in Nepal, creating a migration phenomenon due to extreme weather conditions. The episode highlights how forced migration causes the loss of ancient local traditions and the abandonment of sacred sites.

=== Episode 2: Wood Wide Web ===
The second episode is set in two different places: in the Peruvian Amazon and in Estonia. In the Peruvian forest, Anne de Carbuccia meets Jared Cairuna Cauper, an Indigenous ranger, who takes care of nature and the Amazon river. He battles against big corporations and cocaleros, who cut down trees, with the aid of new technologies, combined with ancient knowledge of the local community.

Meanwhile, in Estonia, Anne meets Ettie Mikita, who works with sustainable start-ups that want to center caring for the planet in the modern world. Ettie walks Anne through Estonian traditions (such as the Midsummer festival) and the new improvements made in technology to help slow down the climate breakdown.

=== Episode 3: Blue Print ===
Anne de Carbuccia travels to Mexico's Yucatán Peninsula and meets a group of people that fights for protection of the coastal heritage, and speaks to community advocate Liliana Rodriguez Cortes. Here, the episode shows how pollution infects ocean water and the threat it poses to marine wildlife.

In the same episode Anne goes to Liguria, in Italy, and dives in the sea with marine biologist, Mariasole Bianco. Together they talk about raising awareness about marine life and its fragility.

Then, with microplastics specialist, Roberto Ambrosini, the episode explores the damage that pollution and plastic overconsumption has not only on the environment, but on human health as well.

=== Episode 4: Island of Coherence ===
The fourth episode takes place in Siberia, on Lake Baikal. This lake is one of the deepest and purest water reserves on Earth and, at the same time, holds great spiritual significance for local populations.

Anne de Carbuccia joins locals Max Savchenko and Dasha Filippova as they discuss pollution, wildfires and growing water conflicts that endanger the ecosystem.

=== Episode 5: Children of the Anthropocene ===
In the fifth and final episode, the protagonists are youth movements from all the global North and their fights. There are Fridays for Future, Last Generation, World Youth for Climate Justice and Urgenda. The episode follows the activities of all these movements: legal battles, civil disobedience, peaceful protests and so on.

== Premieres and Festivals ==
- Rome Film Festival: In October 2025, the series premiered at the Roman festival with episode III, "Blue Print".
- Tallinn Black Nights Film Festival: In November 2025 the series premiered its second episode, "Wood Wide Web", at the Estonian festival.

== Reviews ==
TV Series Choose Earth has been reviewed by the following:

- Ciak
- Sky TG24
- Radio RAI L'aria che respiri
- ANSA
- La Repubblica
- Virgilio
- Postimees

Director Anne de Carbuccia was a guest on national Italian television programme, Geo, on Rai 3.
