= Ventura Lambrate =

International design show

Ventura Lambrate is an international design show, held annually in April in Milan, Italy. Its sister shows, Ventura Interieur, is held biennial in October, in Courtray, Belgium, during Courtray Design Biennale Interieur and Ventura Berlin took place in October 2011 during Qubique in Berlin.

The show began in 2010 with Ventura Lambrate, and was declared an instant success, resulting that the show expanded into Germany and Belgium, and was renamed Ventura Projects. All shows run parallel to large design events.
