= Penguin European Writers =

Penguin European Writers is a series of books published by Penguin Books in the UK. The series began in 2018, and contains forgotten classics by European writers with introductions by acclaimed contemporary authors.

== Books ==
#	Title	Author	Release date
1	Death in Spring	Mercè Rodoreda	5 April 2018
2	The Beautiful Summer	Cesare Pavese	7 June 2018
3	The Lady and the Little Fox Fur	Violette Leduc	6 September 2018
4	The Train Was on Time	Heinrich Böll	28 February 2019
5	A Moth to a Flame	Stig Dagerman	5 September 2019
6	Women	Mihail Sebastian	30 April 2020
7	Three Summers	Margarita Liberaki	24 June 2021
8	Stories of Ireland	Brian Friel	13 March 2025

== See also ==
- Green Ideas
- Penguin Crime & Espionage
- Penguin Essentials
