= Zackheim =

Zackheim is a surname. Notable people with the surname include:

- Adrian Zackheim, American book editor
- Michele Zackheim (born 1941), American writer and visual artist

== See also ==
- Sackheim
- Zakheim
