= The Beautiful Summer (disambiguation) =

The Beautiful Summer is a 1940 novella by Cesare Pavese and also the name of a collection of three novellas, published in 1949.

The Beautiful Summer may also refer to:

- La bellissima estate, a 1974 Italian film
- The Beautiful Summer (film), a 2023 Italian film loosely based on the novella
