= Penguin Essentials =

UK book series

Penguin Essentials (also called Essential Penguins) refers to two series of books published by Penguin Books in the UK. The first series began in 1998, and the second in 2011. For both series, the classic books were released in smaller A-format size; the covers were redesigned by contemporary artists to appeal to a new generation of readers. Many titles appeared in both series.

== 2011 series ==
#	Title	Author	Pages	Release date
1	Goodbye to All That	Robert Graves	368	7 April 2011
2	Out of Africa	Karen Blixen	336	7 April 2011
3	A Clockwork Orange	Anthony Burgess	144	7 April 2011
4	Breakfast at Tiffany's	Truman Capote	176	7 April 2011
5	My Family and Other Animals	Gerald Durrell	320	7 April 2011
6	The Great Gatsby	F. Scott Fitzgerald	208	7 April 2011
7	A Room with a View	E. M. Forster	224	7 April 2011
8	Cold Comfort Farm	Stella Gibbons	240	7 April 2011
9	Steppenwolf	Hermann Hesse	256	7 April 2011
10	On the Road	Jack Kerouac	288	7 April 2011
11	Lady Chatterley's Lover	D. H. Lawrence	320	7 April 2011
12	Wide Sargasso Sea	Jean Rhys	160	7 April 2011
13	Bonjour Tristesse	Françoise Sagan	112	7 April 2011
14	Hell's Angels	Hunter S. Thompson	336	7 April 2011
15	A Confederacy of Dunces	John Kennedy Toole	416	7 April 2011
16	Cat's Cradle	Kurt Vonnegut	224	7 April 2011
17	Brideshead Revisited	Evelyn Waugh	432	7 April 2011
18	Lolita	Vladimir Nabokov	368	7 April 2011
19	Eva Luna	Isabel Allende	304	7 April 2011
20	The Prime of Miss Jean Brodie	Muriel Spark	128	5 April 2012
21	Junky	William S. Burroughs	144	5 April 2012
22	Mrs Dalloway	Virginia Woolf	208	5 April 2012
23	Heart of Darkness	Joseph Conrad	112	5 April 2012
24	The Periodic Table	Primo Levi	208	5 April 2012
25	Three Men in a Boat	Jerome K. Jerome	176	5 April 2012
26	In Cold Blood	Truman Capote	352	5 April 2012
27	Lucky Jim	Kingsley Amis	272	5 April 2012
28	Dubliners	James Joyce	256	5 April 2012
29	The Diary of a Nobody	George Grossmith and Weedon Grossmith	240	5 April 2012
30	The Thin Man	Dashiell Hammett	240	5 April 2012
...				
33	A Month in the Country	J. L. Carr	112	14 August 2014
34	The Man in the High Castle	Philip K. Dick	256	14 August 2014
...				
36	Tender is the Night	F. Scott Fitzgerald	336	14 August 2014
37	A Handful of Dust	Evelyn Waugh	288	14 August 2014
38	Invisible Man	Ralph Ellison	608	14 August 2014
39	The Day of the Triffids	John Wyndham	240	14 August 2014
40	An Ice-Cream War	William Boyd	416	14 August 2014
41	Regeneration	Pat Barker	352	14 August 2014
42	The Big Sleep	Raymond Chandler	256	14 August 2014
43	I'm the King of the Castle	Susan Hill	208	14 August 2014
44	Perfume	Patrick Süskind	272	6 August 2015
45	In the Country of Men	Hisham Matar	256	6 August 2015
46	The History of Love	Nicole Krauss	272	6 August 2015
47	A Passage to India	E. M. Forster	304	6 August 2015
48	Billy Liar	Keith Waterhouse	176	6 August 2015
49	The Mosquito Coast	Paul Theroux	384	6 August 2015
50	Hideous Kinky	Esther Freud	192	6 August 2015
51	Asylum	Patrick McGrath	272	6 August 2015
52	Moon Tiger	Penelope Lively	224	6 August 2015
53	Foe	J. M. Coetzee	160	6 August 2015
...				
55	Everything Is Illuminated	Jonathan Safran Foer	288	4 August 2016
...				
57	What a Carve Up!	Jonathan Coe	512	4 August 2016
58	Love in the Time of Cholera	Gabriel García Márquez	368	4 August 2016
59	The Lady in the Lake	Raymond Chandler	288	4 August 2016
60	Embers	Sandor Marai	256	4 August 2016
61	The Spy Who Came in from the Cold	John le Carré	288	4 August 2016
62	A Kestrel for a Knave	Barry Hines	176	4 August 2016
63	How Many Miles to Babylon?	Jennifer Johnston	160	4 August 2016
64	The Millstone	Margaret Drabble	176	4 August 2016
65	Are You Experienced?	William Sutcliffe	256	1 June 2017
66	High Fidelity	Nick Hornby	256	1 June 2017
...				
68	The Reluctant Fundamentalist	Mohsin Hamid	224	1 June 2017
69	White Teeth	Zadie Smith	560	1 June 2017
70	The Road To Lichfield	Penelope Lively	176	1 June 2017
71	A Short History of Tractors in Ukrainian	Marina Lewycka	336	1 June 2017
72	Any Human Heart	William Boyd	512	1 June 2017
73	A Start in Life	Anita Brookner	176	1 June 2017
...				
75	Brooklyn	Colm Tóibín	272	7 June 2018
76	Villages	John Updike	336	7 June 2018
...				
78	The Chrysalids	John Wyndham	208	7 June 2018
79	Age of Iron	J. M. Coetzee	208	7 June 2018
80	The Hound of the Baskervilles	Arthur Conan Doyle	224	7 June 2018
81	Austerlitz	W. G. Sebald	448	7 June 2018
...				
83	Libra	Don DeLillo	464	7 June 2018
...				
85	The Pursuit of Love	Nancy Mitford	224	7 June 2018
...				
91	Down and Out in Paris and London	George Orwell	224	
...				
94	Animal Farm	George Orwell	112	
95	1984	George Orwell	336	
...				
102	The Plague	Albert Camus	304	
103	The Snow Goose and The Small Miracle	Paul Gallico	80	
...				
106	Swallowing Geography	Deborah Levy	96	6 June 2019
107	The Bastard of Istanbul	Elif Shafak	368	6 June 2019
108	Submarine	Joe Dunthorne	304	6 June 2019
109	Ancient Light	John Banville	256	6 June 2019
110	The Rotters' Club	Jonathan Coe	416	6 June 2019
111	The Photograph	Penelope Lively	204	6 June 2019
...				
113	Beautiful Ruins	Jess Walter	368	6 June 2019
114	A Spell of Winter	Helen Dunmore	320	6 June 2019
115	The Case-Book of Sherlock Holmes	Arthur Conan Doyle	320	6 June 2019
...				
117	The Wanting Seed	Anthony Burgess	208	18 May 2023
118	Hotel du Lac	Anita Brookner	192	18 May 2023
119	Mr Loverman	Bernardine Evaristo	320	18 May 2023
120	The Forty Rules of Love	Elif Shafak	368	18 May 2023
121	The Rain Before it Falls	Jonathan Coe	288	18 May 2023
122	The Girls' Guide to Hunting and Fishing	Melissa Bank	304	18 May 2023

== See also ==
- Green Ideas
- Penguin Crime & Espionage
- Penguin European Writers
- Penguin Red Classics
- Pocket Penguins
