= The Trials of Nikki Hill =

1999 legal thriller novel

- First edition cover
- Author: Christopher Darden and Dick Lochte
- Language: English
- Genre: Legal thriller novel
- Publisher: Time Warner
- Publication date: 1999
- Publication place: United States
- Media type: Print (Paperback)

The Trials of Nikki Hill is a legal thriller written by Christopher Darden and Dick Lochte, and published Time Warner Company in 1999.

== Plot summary ==
The protagonist of this legal thriller is 33-year-old, Nikki Hill. Nikki is a lead prosecutor at the District Attorney's office, and he has trusted her to help find the killer of Madeleine Gray, Hollywood's most popular TV host of a blackmail show.

At first there is a hands down suspect, Jamal Deschamps, who was found at the scene of the crime. He possessed her ring and his skin was also under Maddie's thumb. After a lie detector test, it was proven that Deschamps was not the killer. It turned out, he merely found the cadaver and whilst stealing its ring, cut himself on her thumb. Nikki, another smart aleck prosecutor, and two quirky homicide detectives have a few loose strings, and bewilderment of who the real killer is. At Maddie's mansion, there was a missing rug, and a glass a ball that had Maddie's blood on it. And upstairs, where her blackmail files are, there is a busted drawer with missing contents. Nikki and the team discover that R&B singer, Diana Cooper, had a fight with Maddie the day of the murder. She quickly becomes a major suspect when Maddie's blood is also found in her trunk. The detectives come up with a scenario: Maddie threatened to give Diana's blackmail information, so she stole it and killed Maddie. This was soon proven wrong when detective Goodman's girlfriend confessed to stealing the black mail file for Diana's husband. Diana's charges were also dropped due to conflict with her alibi the time of the murder. Next, fingers were pointed towards John Willins, Diana's husband. Maddie had told Palmer, her neighbor, that she had slept with a J man. There were also logs at a private getaway club that a J. W. and M. Gray went together several times. Nikki and the team try to trace John Willin's past, and it turned up that he was from a small town. While putting together clues, they find out that John's family was killed in a fire, and that he could be taking on the identity of his deceased cousin. This leads to another question: did he murder his family with the fire? The only way to really find out was to go to the town and see if there was a grave for "John Willins". When they report this phenomenal news to district attorney, Joe Walden, he decides he wants to come along. And when they finally get to the town's only cemetery, they find out that Joe Walden, the district attorney, is the J.W....!

== Critical reception ==
According to Kirkus Reviews, Darden and Lochte fail to "bring any order to the investigation, or create characters [...] who stay in the memory longer than a news story. The result is an ant farm full of bustling but anonymous movement, a sociological primer that would take the skills of Tom Wolfe to turn it into a novel."
