= From the Clouds to the Resistance =

1979 film

- Directed by: Jean-Marie Straub Danièle Huillet
- Written by: Cesare Pavese; Danièle Huillet; Jean-Marie Straub
- Produced by: Danièle Huillet; Jean-Marie Straub
- Starring: Olimpia Carlisi
- Cinematography: Saverio Diamante; Giovanni Canfarelli Modica
- Release date: 7 November 1979
- Running time: 104 minutes
- Country: Italy
- Language: Italian

From the Clouds to the Resistance (Italian: Dalla nube alla resistenza, literally From the Cloud to the Resistance) is a 1979 Italian drama film directed by Danièle Huillet and Jean-Marie Straub. It competed in the Un Certain Regard section at the 1979 Cannes Film Festival.

== Cast ==
- Olimpia Carlisi - The Cloud
- Guido Lombardi - Issione
- Gino Felici - Ippoloco
- Lori Pelosini - Sarpedonte
- Walter Pardini - Edipo
- Ennio Lauricella - Tiresia
- Andrea Bacci - 1st hunter
- Loris Cavallini - 2nd hunter
- Francesco Ragusa - Litierse
- Fiorangelo Pucci - Eracle
- Dolando Bernardini - Father
- Andrea Filippi - Son
- Mauro Monni - The Bastard
- Carmelo Lacorte - Nuto
- Mario di Mattia - Cinto

== Plot ==
- Part One: Six stories taken from Cesare Pavese's Dialoghi con Leucò.

Philosophical conversations between mythological characters including Nephele/The Cloud (Olimpia Carlisi) and Issione/Ixion (Guido Lombardi), Ippòloco/Hippolochus (Gino Felici) and Sarpedonte/Sarpedon (Lori Pelosini), Edipo/Oedipus (Walter Pardini) and Tiresias (Ennio Lauricella), two hunters (Andrea Bacci and Lori Cavallini) discussing reincarnation of humans punished by the gods, Litierse/Lityerses and Eracle/Heracles (Francesco Ragusa and Fiorangelo Pucci), and a father and son (Dolando Bernardini and Andrea Filippi) who are burning a fire as an annual sacrifice to the land.

- Part Two:

Taken from Cesare Pavese's La luna e i falò. After WWII, the emigrant 'The Bastard' (Mauro Monni) comes back to his village in the Langhe (northern Italy) to find that everyone he knew has died and the war has deeply changed relationships between people.
