= Penguin Crime & Espionage =

Book series

Penguin Modern Classics – Crime & Espionage is a series of books published by Penguin Books in the UK. The initial ten books were published in 2023.

== Titles ==
#	Author	Title
1	Davis Grubb	The Night of the Hunter
2	Edogawa Rampo	Beast in the Shadows
3	Dorothy B. Hughes	In a Lonely Place
4	Josephine Tey	The Franchise Affair
5	Eric Ambler	Journey into Fear
6	John le Carré	Call for the Dead
7	Georges Simenon	Maigret and the Headless Corpse
8	Len Deighton	SS-GB
9	Ross Macdonald	The Drowning Pool
10	Chester Himes	Cotton Comes to Harlem
11	Dick Lochte	Sleeping Dog
12	Raymond Chandler	The Big Sleep & Farewell, My Lovely
13	Anthony Price	Other Paths to Glory
14	Edogawa Rampo	The Black Lizard
15	Michael Gilbert	Game Without Rules
16	Georges Simenon	Maigret's Revolver
17	C. S. Forester	Payment Deferred
18	Eric Ambler	The Mask of Dimitrios
19	Josephine Tey	Brat Farrar
20	John le Carré	Tinker Tailor Soldier Spy
21	Ross Macdonald	The Underground Man
22	John Franklin Bardin	The Deadly Percheron
23	Robert van Gulik	The Chinese Gold Murders
24	Cornell Woolrich	I Married a Dead Man
25	Ian Fleming	From Russia with Love
26	Anthony Price	The Labyrinth Makers
27	John le Carré	The Night Manager
28	Edogawa Rampo	Gold Mask
29	Georges Simenon	Night at the Crossroads
30	Shirley Jackson	We Have Always Lived in the Castle

== See also ==
- Penguin Essentials
- Penguin European Writers
- Pocket Penguins
