= Zakhem =

Zakhem or El-Zakhem is a Lebanese Arabic surname. Notable people with the surname include:

- Dan Zakhem (1958–1994), Israeli performance artist
- Elie El-Zakhem (born 1998), Lebanese rugby player
- Sam H. Zakhem (born 1935), Lebanese-born American politician
