= The Moon and the Bonfires =

1950 novel by Cesare Pavese

- First edition (publ. Einaudi)
- Author: Cesare Pavese
- Original title: La luna e i falò
- Translator: Louise Sinclair (1952); R. W. Flint (2002)
- Publication date: 1950
- Award: PEN Translation Prize (2003)

The Moon and the Bonfires (Italian: La luna e i falò) is a 1950 novel by the Italian writer Cesare Pavese. It is considered Pavese's best novel.

The first English language translation was undertaken by Louise Sinclair in 1952, as The Moon and the Bonfire. A more recent translation by R. W. Flint, published in 2002, uses the arguably more correct translation of The Moon and the Bonfires, taking account of the use of the plural i falò in the original Italian title.

The novel is set in the immediate Aftermath of World War II at the small town of Santo Stefano Belbo. A local man who made his fortune in the United States returns after an absence of 25 years. While the smells and sights of his home town seem familiar to him, he soon realizes that the town was deeply changed by the war.

== Plot ==
The novel is set in the small town of Santo Stefano Belbo, in Piedmont, north-west Italy (Pavese's real-life birthplace). The protagonist, known only by his nickname of "Anguilla" ("Eel"), has returned to his home town in the immediate Aftermath of World War II. He left twenty-five years earlier and had made his fortune in the United States. Returning to his home town, he finds many of the same smells and sights that filled his youth, but he also finds a town and its inhabitants that have been deeply changed by war and by the passage of time.

== Awards and honors ==
In 2003, R.W. Flint's translation won the PEN Translation Prize.

== Adaptation ==
The Moon and the Bonfires was one of two Pavese novels (the other being Dialoghi con Leucò) to be adapted by Danièle Huillet and Jean-Marie Straub as part of their 1979 film From the Clouds to the Resistance.
