= Michele Zackheim =

American novelist

- Occupations: Writer, visual artist
- Writing career
- Notable work: Violette's Embrace (1996); Einstein's Daughter: The Search for Lieserl (1999); Broken Colors (2007); Last Train to Paris (2014)
- Notable awards: American Institute of Graphic Arts (1965); Art Directors Club of New York (1966); Graphic Arts/Printing Industries (1967); New Mexico Advertising Association (1981); Western States Arts Federation (1988); National Endowment for the Arts (1988, 1990); National League of Pen Women (1989)
- Website: michelezackheim.com/about/

Michele Zackheim (born 1941) is a contemporary American writer and visual artist, who changed career from visual art to author. Early in her career, she worked on murals, prints, and paintings, and was awarded two grants by the National Endowment for the Arts, for both public art and installations.

Zackheim has also worked as a fresco muralist, an installation artist, printmaker, and a painter. She teaches at the School of Visual Arts in New York City.

Zackheim's books and novels include Violette's Embrace: A Novel (Riverhead Books, 1996), a fictional biography of the French writer Violette Leduc; Einstein's Daughter: The Search for Lieserl (Penguin Putnam, 1999), Broken Colors (Europa Editions, 2007), and Last Train to Paris (Europa Editions, 2014).

== Career ==
Before becoming a writer, Zakheim was active in the visual arts; her works included murals, printmaking and painting. Her work has been exhibited in several museums and galleries. During this time, she received two grants from the National Endowment for the Arts (NEA).

In 1991, at the age of 50, Michele Zakheim switched career from visual art to writing. She gained inspiration and motivation by rereading the autobiographical work La Batarde by French writer Violette Leduc.

== Visual artwork ==
Michelle Zakheim's project The Tent of Meeting was a 1,000 sq ft (93 m^{2}) work that juxtaposed faith-based symbols and scenes in a multi-visual tapestry room. The work showed commonalities between the three monotheistic religions of Judaism, Christianity. The work was inspired by a visit to Mount Sinai, Egypt. The work was exhibited in the opening exhibition at the Episcopal Cathedral of St. John the Divine in New York and in other American cities, including Minnesota. According to Joyce Ann Mercer, this work "transcends the limitations of traditional religious art and creates a truly cross-religious learning space", and particularly commended its "creative height of perfectly integrating installation art, historical research and religious symbols".

After completing The Tent of Meeting, a Zakheim began to focus on loneliness in group work, inspired by cafe culture in Paris. From the perspective of a female cafe guest, The Cafe Series asks whether loneliness is a universal human predicament despite abundant communication networks in modern life. The collection contains 12 woodcut, self-portrait prints. Zackheim first took a selfie, projected the negative onto a board, carved it, cut it into five parts, and then painted it with ink and stencil. Each print is limited to 10 copies.

== Literature ==
=== Violette's Embrace (1996) ===
This novel is a fictional autobiography of Violette Leduc, a nearly forgotten French writer who is portrayed as a neurotic, possessive woman. Set during World War II, the protagonist is obsessed with Simone de Beauvoir, even spying on her in Paris cafes during the war and trying to establish a friendship. Through the dual-perspective narration (narrated by the biographer and Lily), Violette's inner life and the mother-daughter relationship are explored to show her self-recognition and vulnerability. Through this work, Zakheim weaves personal experiences with literary fiction. According to reviewer Kathleen Marszycki, although the narrative pace of this work is relatively slow and sometimes formulaic, it creates three-dimensional character images through the patchwork of scattered notes, anecdotes and real texts. Marszycki said although the narrator's presence is relatively weak, the vivid depiction of the era and region makes it a highly recommended debut work.

=== Einstein's Daughter: The Search for Lieserl (1999) ===
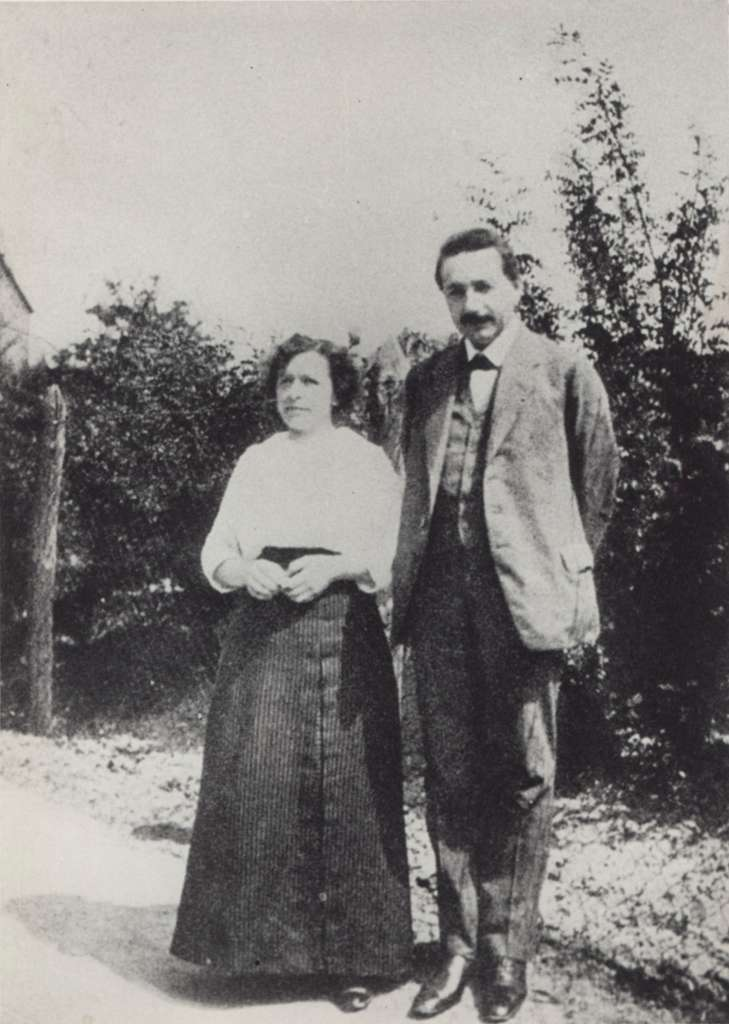
Albert Einstein and Mileva Marić in 1905

This work of non-fiction combines historical research and personal narrative based on the extensive collection of Serbian and German letters and historical archives available. The book focuses on the mystery of the birth and whereabouts of Albert Einstein and Mileva Maric's daughter Lieserl, and speculates on Einstein's private and family life.

=== Broken Colors (2007) ===
The novel follows an artist called Sophie Marx, who is orphaned in the First World War and brought up by her artist grandparents. While studying at Slade School of Art in London, Sophie again experiences the destruction of her home during the Second World War, and later settles in the Southwestern United States. Based on her experience as a visual artist, Zackheim uses delicate and professional descriptions. Kirkus' book review said although this work takes artistic creation as its theme, there are obvious flaws in its narrative structure and writing style. There is a 28-year time jump in the narrative structure, and the dialogue is stiff and unnatural. The novel concludes its narrative loop with the reunion of Sophie and Luca, and Luca's son, an ending the book reviewer said is far-fetched. This book is described as being like an aesthetic discussion rather than a real exchange, giving people a sense of preaching.

=== Last Train to Paris (2014) ===
The novel is set in Europe in 1937 and is based on the real-life kidnapping of the author's distant relatives. Through the perspective of female journalist Rose Manon, her personal fate is intertwined with the crisis of the times, showing her struggle in the sexist press, emotional entanglements with Leon, the kidnapping and murder of her Jewish cousin Stella, and the dilemma of hiding her Jewish identity. The juxtaposition of scenes in the port of Le Havre highlights the contrasting fates of American tourists and Jewish refugees. According to Edward B. Cone in a review for "Library Journal", Zackheim's historical novel combines personal narrative with historical background, and her description of the Kristallnacht is extremely shocking. The author ingeniously interweaves themes such as murder mystery, mother-daughter relationships and Jewish identity. Cone concluded the book vividly recreates the historical atmosphere of the interwar period, and is recommended to readers interested in women's issues and pre-World War II European history.

== Style and evaluation ==
Zakheim's writing combines the characteristics of art and literature, and her creative method continues the observational method of visual art, so her narrative style has a strong visual element. According to Zakheim, writing historical works requires in-depth research and accuracy. She believes novels are unique and allow writers to delve deep into the minds of their characters. She also said her background in visual arts has affected her literary narrative.

== Political and social views ==
Michelle Zakheim has politically far-left views and has attended many political protests. She believes writers have a social responsibility, and as a member of PEN America's Free Writing Committee, she advocates the principles of "good, clear, and honest" writing, and campaigns for policy change for imprisoned writers. She advocates for greater intellectual engagement in social issues rather than relying on a few, and would send leaders of governments that imprison writers books such as Weeping Beloved Nation, The People of July, Prisoners Without Names: Cells Without Numbers, and The Feminine Mystique.

== Academic controversy ==
June Vigor, a book reviewer for Booklist, wrote that Michele Zackheim's first novel, Violette's Embrace (1996), "interweaves themes such as the ambiguity of autobiographies, memories of the Holocaust and the mother-daughter relationship". Although some connections are somewhat far-fetched, the overall narrative successfully presents a multi-level structure. The novel also sparked controversy due to its free switching between historical materials and personal experiences.

Zackheim's book Einstein's Daughter: The Search for Lieserl (1999) sparked controversy due to its speculative description of Albert Einstein's private life. The book focuses on the whereabouts of Lieserl, the daughter born to Einstein and his first wife Mileva Marić, but was severely criticized by physicist Jeremy Bernstein in the American Journal of Physics for relying on speculation about Lieserl's fate.

Kirkus Reviews gave a cautious evaluation of the research methods and conclusions of this book. The book review says although the author consulted a large amount of archival materials and conducted long-term field investigations in Serbia, her core assertion that Lieserl was abandoned due to intellectual disability and died prematurely lacks direct evidence. According to the reviewer, during the research process, Zackheim was over-reliant on local rumors without fully verifying their authenticity. In terms of academic value, Kirkus Reviews questioned the practical significance of this research topic, saying even if the relevant inferences were confirmed, it would not be of substantial help for understanding Einstein's scientific contributions or life experiences.
