= Olimpia Carlisi =

Italian actress (born 1946)

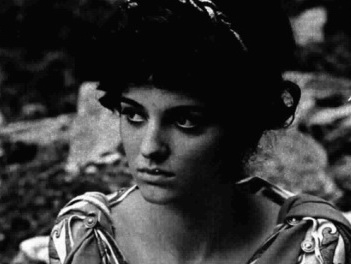
- Carlisi at the set of Ottone (1970)
- Born: 29 December 1946 (age 79); Campi Bisenzio, Florence, Italy
- Occupation: Actress
- Notable work: The Middle of the World (1974)

Olimpia Carlisi (born 29 December 1946) is an Italian stage, film and television actress.

== Career ==
Carlisi was born in Campi Bisenzio, Florence, on 29 December 1946. After her debut as a stage actress, she made her film debut working with Roberto Rossellini in Atti degli apostoli (1968). She focused her career on primarily art films and stage work.

She worked with Jean-Marie Straub and Danièle Huillet in Othon (1970), where her work was praised by critics. American director Mike Nichols cast Carlisi in the role of Luciana in his 1970 film Catch-22, but she tended to work with European directors.

Continuously active on television, Carlisi was the protagonist in 1970 of the RAI experimental drama Olimpia agli amici, directed by film critic Adriano Aprà.

In 1974 she starred in Alain Tanner's The Middle of the World. Two years later she appeared in Fellini's Casanova. In 1979 she again collaborated with Straub and Huillet, in From the Clouds to the Resistance.

In 1980, she hosted an infamous edition of the Sanremo Music Festival alongside Roberto Benigni and Claudio Cecchetto. In 1981 she appeared in Bernardo Bertolucci's Tragedy of a Ridiculous Man, and in Stephen Dwoskin's autofictional film Outside In, made in London for West German television.

== Awards and recognition ==
In 1975, Carlisi won a Globo d'oro for best breakthrough actress.

In 1978, she was nominated for a BAFTA Award for most promising newcomer for her performance in Alain Tanner's The Middle of the World.
