= Incidents in the Rue Laugier =

1995 novel by Anita Brookner

- First edition (UK)
- Author: Anita Brookner
- Language: English
- Publication date: 1995

Incidents in the Rue Laugier is a novel by Anita Brookner, published in 1995 by Jonathan Cape in the UK and by Random House in the USA. In 1996 Penguin Books brought out the paperback edition.

== Plot ==
A few words left on the page of a mother's notebook, found by her daughter after her death, leads the daughter to try and reconstruct the circumstances of how her parents met and their early married life. The mother was Dijon-born Maud Gonthier, daughter of a French civil servant who had died early. Maud's mother Nadine had dedicated her life to giving her daughter a proper upbringing on a small income, their annual holiday being a month spent at her affluent aunt Germaine's country house, La Gaillarderie. There she meets Edward Harrison, and his university friend David Tyler, son of the owner of an advertising agency.

Edward had just come down from Cambridge University with vague plans to travel abroad. He had first gone to Paris, staying at a flat in the Rue Laugier belonging to friends of Tyler's, then afterwards joined Tyler at La Gaillarderie. Tyler is a skilful womaniser who enthrals the repressed and inexperienced Maud and soon seduces her. Afterwards they leave for the flat in the Rue Laugier, accompanied by Edward, who realises that Tyler will shortly abandon Maud. This happens when Tyler leaves abruptly to join another house party just as Maud discovers she is pregnant.

Edward feels responsible for looking after Maud and proposes to her, then returns to England to complete arrangements. Earlier he had inherited a specialist bookshop in London and engaged Tom Cook to help him run it. Now he searches for a suitable flat. In Dijon, meanwhile, Maud miscarries and wishes to break her engagement, but her mother refuses to support her. From Nadine's viewpoint, only by marriage can Maud's reputation be saved.

Once Maud and Edward marry, their relations are more like a partnership. Maud feels no passionate bond such as she experienced with Tyler but is grateful to Edward and prepared to play the part of a dutiful wife. Edward's physical relationship is passionate but he becomes increasingly frustrated that he cannot break through Maud's inherited reticence and channels his main energies into making a success of his business. Visiting La Gaillarderie on her own a few years later, Maud again meets Tyler and resists the temptation to resume their affair, realising that the past cannot be recaptured in that way.

Following several more early miscarriages, Maud's daughter Mary Françoise ('Maffy') is born and Maud's physical and mental state goes into a decline for some years. Edward is delighted to be a father but is disappointed when Maffy seems to have inherited her mother's reticent nature and cannot return his affection as demonstratively as he would wish. With Maffy approaching adulthood, Edward conceals the symptoms of a brain tumour and suddenly dies, followed by Maud's slower decline.

The reconstruction of their life, reliant on the handful of names jotted on only one page of the inherited notebook, makes of Maffy "an unreliable narrator", as she admits. Now she prepares to sell the bookshop and join Nadine in Dijon before, perhaps, making the independent future for herself which her parents had been denied by circumstances.

== Reception ==
According to Cheryl Alexander Malcolm, "Without exception, Brookner's novels chronicle their protagonists' realisation that life is not what they expected it to be, and, in her later novels particularly, how they maintain their dignity in spite of their disappointments." There are two such women in Incidents in the Rue Laugier, Brookner's fifteenth novel: Nadine Gonthier, the early-widowed mother of Maud, and her equally reticent daughter Maud. Because in this case their story is a narrative contained within a narrative, however, "a construction of reality based more on imagination than fact", its truth to life is left uncertain.

Preoccupied with loneliness and missed opportunities, in common with much of Brookner's fiction, the novel was greeted on its appearance as "one of her better efforts", but there were also dissenting voices. Fellow-novelist Hilary Mantel's review for The New York Times only found the first two thirds of it really effective, while Brian Fallon, writing in The Irish Times, concurred with other critics of Brookner's novels in finding "the dramatis personae vapid and uninteresting".
