= Tamar Raban =

Israeli painter, sculptor, and performance artist

Tamar Raban (Hebrew: תמר רבן; born 1955) is an Israeli artist, who also creates and works in performance field. Founder and Artistic Director of Performance Stage, Ensemble 209 and the ZAZ Festival. She is one of the most prominent performance artists in Israel and her performances have been exhibited in Israel and abroad in festivals, theaters, galleries, museums, shelter 209 and in performance stage. Co-founder of the Dan Zackheim 209 Shelter for the Advancement of Interdisciplinary Art in Israel Founder and Artistic Director of the Performance and Ensemble Stage 209.

== Biography ==
Tamar Raban, painter and sculptor, was born in 1955, Haifa. During the years 1979–1982 Raban studied art and Hebrew literature at the University of Haifa, and later studied video art at the Bezalel Academy of Arts and Design, Jerusalem, from 1983 to 1986.

Raban's daughter, Noa Knoller, is an actress and theater director.

== Art career ==
In 1988, Raban was one of the founders of the Dan Zackheim 209 Shelter for the Advancement of Interdisciplinary Art in Israel, and in 2001 she founded the 209 Ensemble and the Performance Stage, and in 2006 she founded the ZAZ Festival, an international performance art festival.

She is currently the Artistic Director of Performance Stage, Ensemble 209 and the ZAZ Festival. In addition, she teaches performance art in schools and art academies and the School of Visual Theater. She is the moderator of workshops for performance art, post-modern theater and post-drama in Israel and abroad.

Her first painting work, which is evident in the visual presence and the integration of visual images in the videos that she includes in her works. During she studied at the University of Haifa, Raban experienced a significant encounter with the work of artist Motti Mizrahi, who performed at the university at that time, and understood that this is a way of expression that interests her. Raban's final project in her studies was the performance "Mirror Mirror", which was also presented in 1982 at the Biennale of Young Artists in Haifa; Raban referred to her work at this stage as a kind of living and complex painting.

Later she moved to Tel Aviv and participated in various art events in that time, such as the Rothschild Sculpture Exhibition (1984) and the Acre Theater Festival. After the show "Birds Hanging in the Square" at the Israel Festival, where she performed with a group of participants (1988), she began working with her friends in Ensemble 209 in a shelter she received from the municipality to use as a studio. The place became a space for permanent work by the ensemble members in the field of performance and video art.

Raban's work outright as they do about the artist and reality. Over the years, they have shrunk in the number of participants, over time and space they occupy, creating an increasing density of expression. Around the exhibition "Installation – Documentation – Performance+" (1994) Raban expressed the crisis she experienced in relation to art and objects: They add to her ever waste are ecologically, and that they lose their function and meaning when experienced in the consciousness of the viewer or the context of the work were complete. In this exhibition, and as a direct continuation of her personal experience in the "Life-Life" exhibition she presented the previous year, Raban began to examine her attitude toward objects and art and move closer to the field of performance.

Raban's works are among the only plain and the many plain as tension underlying conflicts between work and receipts derived from other contrasts: between automatic and repetitive and chaotic and threatening; Between industrialized and natural and human; Between the cruel and the innocent. It shows how the forces of destruction that are singular, and plural may permeate each other and mingle without separation. For example, the work "Self-altar" at the Janco Dada Museum (1991), drained her blood in front of the crowd, then pumped to the sink altar, self-destructive act which raised a victim of the artist herself. Thus, the work describes the artist as the god, the worshiper and the victim together in a closed circle that has no outlet, unless the artist has stopped him.

=== Ensemble 209 and installation stage ===
In 2001, the Ensemble 209 group moved from a shelter to a space in Beit Merkazim in southern Tel Aviv, which was burned down in 2003, and in March 2004 its activity was transferred to the new Central Bus Station. Then established "Stage Performance" (Performance Art Platform), rooted in the shelter 209, and which is a space dedicated to the field of performance art in general and in particular Raban's work and is under the artistic direction. The common denominator of the three spaces in which Ensemble 209 and Matza performed are that they are not theater spaces in the original, but rather alternative spaces.

Although some of Raban's works in the performance stage are not directly related to the space of the central bus station, the location of the performance stage in the central bus station is of artistic and social significance to her. Raban herself wrote that "the central bus station, which serves as a microcosm of cultural and margins as the abode of the company, a source of inspiration for me."

Raban appears in almost all of her works in a performance stage and creates a stage character that is herself and also a unique figure for the show. Her performances deal with questions of identity and are based on gestures and actions that take on significance during the performance itself. This is how the show "Grandma's Stories: A Woman's Wives and Effie Lee's Cake (סיפורי סבתא: קומי אישה ואפי לי עוגה) ", created by Raban in collaboration with Guy Gutman (2005), includes an actual kitchen built for the show. According to researcher Dr. Sharon Aharonson-Lehavi, the show was a textual and visual collage of fairy tales and childhood stories dealing with food, feeding, baking, women and girls, which were dismantled and remodeled. The show – so that the audience becomes a momentary community that shares what is happening.

== Education ==
1974–75 WIZO College of Design, Haifa

1978–82 Haifa University, Creative Art

1983–86 Bezalel Academy of Arts & Design, Jerusalem

== Selected exhibitions ==
- 1994 “From Within”, Israel Art Museum, Ramat Gan
- 1994 “Artist-Teacher-Artist”, Avni Institute of Art, Tel Aviv
- 1993 Navon Gallery, Neve Ilan
- 1993 “Leife-Life” in Collaboration with Dan Zakhem, Borochov Gallery, Tel Aviv
- 1992 The Second Biennale of Sculpture, Ein Hod
- 1991 “Dada Head,” Shleter 209 Installation “Self-Sacrifice”, Janko Dada Museum, Ein Hod
- 1990 “The City Streets Are Wrapped in Plastic Forest and We’re Not Breathing”, Nes Harim Forest
- 1990 “Porcelain”, Exhibition of the Winner of the Young Artist Prize, Herzilia Museum
- 1990 “Windvane”, Sculpture Garden, Jaffa
- 1989 Shelter 209: “Objects from Performances,”, Kallsher 5 Gallery, Tel Aviv
- 1989 “Berries”; Environmental Work, Nes Harim Forest
- 1984 Sculpture in Roth child blvd., Ahad HaAm 90, Gallery

== Selected performances ==
- 1992 Shelter 209, Program #5: “Sleeping on Performance Time – Homage to Olympia the Bitch – A Workless Work.”
- 1990 Shelter 209 Program #3: “Self-Portrait: Autoanatomy and Projected Autobiography of an Israeli Performance Artist.”, Israel Festival, Jerusalem
- 1989 Shelter 209 Program #2: “Porcelain.”, Tel Aviv
- 1988 Shelter 209 Program #1: “Striptease.”
- 1988 “Birds Hanging in the Square.”, Israel Festival, Jerusalem
- 1987 “A Cow Eats Without a Knife (The Last Supper in Tel-Hai)”, collaborated with Yoram Porat, Tel-Hai Contemporary Art Festival
- 1986 “Erev Tov” (an evening of poetry and performance), homage to Omama, Tzavta Club, Tel Aviv
- 1986 “Sensitive Zones in Iron”, Acre Alternative Theater Festival, Acre
- 1982 “Mirror, Mirror”, Young Artist Biennale, Haifa Museum of Modern Art, Haifa

== Video art ==
1990 “Video Self-Portrait”, Photo Optica, International Video Festival, San Paolo, Brazil

== Awards ==
1990 The Young Artist Award, The Arts and Sculpture Council of the Ministry of Education and Culture.
