= Zakheim =

Zakheim, Zakhem (Hebrew: זקהיים) is a Jewish surname. This surname is an acronym for "They are of the holy seed" in Hebrew. Probably all Zakheims are descendants of Rabbi Yisrael the Martyr of Ruzhany who died as martyr in Ruzhany, Belarus in 1659. The sons of R'Israel took the surname Za'k which represents the word 'zera kodesh' meaning 'Holy Seed'. Later the name was changed to Zackheim which means 'They Are of the Holy Seed'. Other common spellings are Zack, Zackheim, Zachem, Sack, and Sackheim

Notable people with the surname include:

- Bernard Zakheim (1898–1985), Polish muralist
- Dan Zakheim (1958–1994), Israeli sculptors
- Dov S. Zakheim (born 1948), American politician
