= Swallowing Geography =

1993 novel by Deborah Levy

- Cover of Jonathan Cape edition (1993)
- Author: Deborah Levy
- Publisher: Jonathan Cape
- Publication date: 1993
- Pages: 85
- ISBN: 9780224027298

Swallowing Geography is a novel by Deborah Levy, published in 1993 by Jonathan Cape. It was rereleased by Penguin Essentials in 2019.
