= Penguin Red Classics =

Penguin Red Classics is a series of novels published by Penguin Books in the UK. There are 39 books in the series. The books are from the Penguin Classics imprint, but do not contain any introductory material or commentary, instead focusing on the story.

== Titles ==
Title	Author
Things Fall Apart	Chinua Achebe
Emma	Jane Austen
Mansfield Park	Jane Austen
Northanger Abbey	Jane Austen
Persuasion	Jane Austen
Pride and Prejudice	Jane Austen
Sense and Sensibility	Jane Austen
Old Goriot	Balzac
Seize the Day	Saul Bellow
The Sheltering Sky	Paul Bowles
Jane Eyre	Charlotte Brontë
Wuthering Heights	Emily Brontë
The Master and Margarita	Mikhail Bulgakov
Alice's Adventures in Wonderland	Lewis Carroll
Great Expectations	Charles Dickens
The Great Gatsby	F. Scott Fitzgerald
North and South	Elizabeth Gaskell
The Sorrows of Young Werther	J. V. W. Goethe
The Metamorphosis	Franz Kafka
Love in the Time of Cholera	Gabriel García Márquez
Mozart's Journey to Prague	Eduard Mörike
Lolita	Vladimir Nabokov
A Spy in the House of Love	Anaïs Nin
The Narrative of Arthur Gordon Pym	Edgar Allan Poe
Venus in Furs	Leopold von Sacher-Masoch
Frankenstein	Mary Shelley
Of Mice and Men	John Steinbeck
The Strange Case of Dr Jekyll and Mr Hyde	R. L. Stevenson
Perfume	Patrick Süskind
The Secret History	Donna Tartt
The Death of Ivan Ilyich	Leo Tolstoy
A Confederacy of Dunces	John Kennedy Toole
The Adventures of Huckleberry Finn	Mark Twain
Marry Me	John Updike
The Day of the Locust	Nathanael West
The Age of Innocence	Edith Wharton
The Bridge of San Luis Rey	Thornton Wilder
Orlando	Virginia Woolf
Chess	Stefan Zweig

== See also ==
- Penguin Essentials
- Pocket Penguins
