= Are You Experienced? (novel) =

1997 novel written by William Sutcliffe

- Cover of first edition (1997)
- Author: William Sutcliffe
- Publisher: Hamish Hamilton
- Publication date: 1997
- Pages: 233
- ISBN: 9780241137819

Are You Experienced? is a novel by William Sutcliffe published in 1997. It is a pre-university gap year novel in which a group of young Brits travel to India without really knowing what to expect or what to do there. It was rereleased by Penguin Essentials in 2017.
