= The Middle of the World (1974 film) =

1974 film

- French film poster
- Directed by: Alain Tanner
- Written by: Alain Tanner; John Berger
- Produced by: Yves Gasser
- Starring: Olimpia Carlisi; Philippe Léotard; Juliet Berto
- Cinematography: Renato Berta
- Edited by: Brigitte Sousselier
- Music by: Patrick Moraz
- Production company: Citel Films
- Release date: August 1974 (LFF)
- Running time: 120 minutes
- Country: Switzerland
- Language: French

The Middle of the World (French: Le Milieu du monde) is a 1974 Swiss film directed by Alain Tanner and written by Tanner and John Berger, set against the backdrop of a provincial election campaign. It premiered at the 1974 Locarno Film Festival and was also screened at the San Sebastian Film Festival and the New York Film Festival. In 1978, Olimpia Carlisi received a BAFTA nomination for her performance.

== Synopsis ==
Paul, a married engineer and conservative candidate in a local election, falls in love with Adriana, an Italian café waitress. As his party takes a critical stance towards foreign labour, Paul becomes increasingly committed to the relationship and is prepared to leave his wife. Adriana, however, feels the growing social pressure around them and ultimately leaves him.

== Cast ==
The cast includes:

- Olimpia Carlisi as Adriana
- Philippe Léotard as Paul
- Juliet Berto as Juliette
- Jacques Denis as Marcel
- Denise Péron as Frau Schmidt
- Roger Jendly as Roger
- Gilbert Bahon as Albert
- Adrien Nicati as Paul's father

== Reception ==
=== Awards and nominations ===
Olimpia Carlisi was nominated for the BAFTA Award for Most Promising Newcomer to Leading Film Roles in 1978 for The Middle of the World.

The film was selected as Switzerland’s submission for the Best Foreign Language Film category at the 47th Academy Awards, but was not nominated.

=== Critical response ===
Filmdienst wrote that the film portrays failures of change, self-understanding, and communication as consequences of entanglement in power relations. Filmpodium noted that it uses voice-over to create a Brechtian distancing effect, and particularly praised Olimpia Carlisi’s performance. Filmo described the film as Alain Tanner’s most theoretical work, noting its distancing effects and the way it disrupts the story’s apparent realism.

== Digitisation ==
In 2024, the film was digitised by Filmo in collaboration with Renato Berta, DNA Films and the Association Alain Tanner, with support from Suissimage.

== Festival screenings ==
The film's festival screenings included its premiere at the 1974 Locarno Film Festival, as well as screenings at the San Sebastian Film Festival and the New York Film Festival that year. In 1975, it was also shown at the Solothurner Filmtage and the Viennale. It was later screened at festivals including the International Film Festival Rotterdam in 1993, the International Filmfestival Mannheim-Heidelberg in 2011, the Mostra Internacional de Cinema de São Paulo in 2017, and the Festival Lumière in Lyon in 2025.

== See also ==
- List of submissions to the 47th Academy Awards for Best Foreign Language Film
- List of Swiss submissions for the Academy Award for Best Foreign Language Film
