= Pocket Penguins =

Pocket Penguins is a series of books released by Penguin Classics in 2016. The series echoes the style of the original Penguin Books, with smaller A-format size, and tri-band design. The first 20 books were released in May 2016, and described by publishing director Simon Winder as "a mix of the famous and the unjustly overlooked". A Pocket Penguins series of 70 titles was published to celebrate Penguin's 70th birthday in 2005. It is known as the Pocket Penguins 70s and is available as a boxed set. A similar set of pocket Penguin 60s – this time only 60 books, each with 60 pages – was published to mark the company's 60th birthday in 1995.

== Titles ==
The book jackets are coloured according to the book's original language: English, Russian, Spanish, German, Italian, Czech, French, Latin, Japanese, Yiddish and Chinese.

No.	Title	Author	Language	Pages	ISBN	Release date
1	The Beast Within	Émile Zola	French	480	9780241261736	26 May 2016
2	O Pioneers!	Willa Cather	English	208	9780241262153	26 May 2016
3	The Cossacks and Hadji Murat	Leo Tolstoy	Russian	416	9780241261897	26 May 2016
4	The Malay Archipelago	Alfred Russel Wallace	English	752	9780241261873	26 May 2016
5	The Notebooks of Malte Laurids Brigge	Rainer Maria Rilke	German	224	9780241261194	26 May 2016
6	Mrs Dalloway	Virginia Woolf	English	224	9780241261798	26 May 2016
7	Out of Africa	Karen Blixen	English	400	9780241262115	26 May 2016
8	Metamorphosis	Franz Kafka	German	320	9780241260654	26 May 2016
9	My Childhood	Maxim Gorky	Russian	272	9780241261958	26 May 2016
10	The House of Ulloa	Emilia Pardo Bazán	Spanish	304	9780241259160	26 May 2016
11	A Parisian Affair	Guy de Maupassant	French	368	9780241260845	26 May 2016
12	The Betrothed	Alessandro Manzoni	Italian	832	9780241259078	26 May 2016
13	Walden	Henry David Thoreau	English	336	9780241261859	26 May 2016
14	Fathers and Sons	Ivan Turgenev	Russian	272	9780241261972	26 May 2016
15	The Rainbow	D. H. Lawrence	English	592	9780241260739	26 May 2016
16	The Call of Cthulhu	H. P. Lovecraft	English	512	9780241260777	26 May 2016
17	The Secret Agent	Joseph Conrad	English	320	9780241259528	26 May 2016
18	The Good Soldier Švejk	Jaroslav Hašek	Czech	912	9780241260036	26 May 2016
19	The Lost Estate	Henri Alain-Fournier	French	256	9780241258910	26 May 2016
20	The Master and Margarita	Mikhail Bulgakov	Russian	528	9780241259320	26 May 2016
21	The Gambler and A Nasty Business	Fyodor Dostoyevsky	Russian	272	9780241259580	4 August 2016
22	The Heart Is a Lonely Hunter	Carson McCullers	English	384	9780241259740	4 August 2016
23	The Island of Doctor Moreau	H. G. Wells	English	160	9780241261828	4 August 2016
24	Storm of Steel	Ernst Jünger	German	304	9780241261996	4 August 2016
25	Don't Look Now	Daphne du Maurier	English	320	9780241259726	4 August 2016
26	The Twelve Caesars	Suetonius	Latin	432	9780241261675	4 August 2016
27	Wind, Sand and Stars	Antoine de Saint-Exupéry	French	160	9780241261644	4 August 2016
28	Sanshirō	Natsume Sōseki	Japanese	272	9780241284469	4 August 2016
29	Dream Story	Arthur Schnitzler	German	96	9780241284483	4 August 2016
30	Good Morning, Midnight	Jean Rhys	English	176	9780241261408	4 August 2016
31	Put Out More Flags	Evelyn Waugh	English	384	9780241261699	3 November 2016
32	The Magician of Lublin	Isaac Bashevis Singer	Yiddish	624	9780241260692	3 November 2016
33	Eugénie Grandet	Honoré de Balzac	French	784	9780241260050	3 November 2016
34	The Age of Reason	Jean-Paul Sartre	French	336	9780241259696	3 November 2016
35	The Good Soldier	Ford Madox Ford	English	256	9780241259405	3 November 2016
36	Lust, Caution	Eileen Chang	Chinese	352	9780241259092	3 November 2016
37	Laughter in the Dark	Vladimir Nabokov	Russian	192	9780241261248	3 November 2016
38	Ten Days That Shook the World	John Reed	English	368	9780241261170	3 November 2016
39	Dead Souls	Nikolai Gogol	Russian	512	9780241259993	3 November 2016
40	Monkey	Wu Cheng'en	Chinese	400	9780241259184	3 November 2016

== Pocket Penguins series of 2005 ==
A Pocket Penguins series of 70 titles was published to celebrate Penguin's 70th birthday in 2005. Each has 64 pages. They were designed to be collectable with each cover created as part of a project undertaken by 70 leading artists and designers. Among the authors in the Pocket Penguin series are: Eric Schlosser, Nick Hornby, Albert Camus, P. D. James, Richard Dawkins, India Knight, Marian Keyes, Jorge Luis Borges, Roald Dahl, Jonathan Safran Foer, Homer, Paul Theroux, Elizabeth David, Anaïs Nin, Antony Beevor, Gustave Flaubert, Anne Frank, James Kelman, Hari Kunzru, Simon Schama, William Trevor, George Orwell, Michael Moore, Helen Dunmore, J. K. Galbraith, Gervase Phinn, W. G. Sebald, Redmond O'Hanlon, Ali Smith, Sigmund Freud, Simon Armitage, Hunter S. Thompson, Vladimir Nabokov, Niall Ferguson, Muriel Spark, Steven Pinker, Tony Harrison, John Updike, Will Self, H. G. Wells, Noam Chomsky, Jamie Oliver, Virginia Woolf, Zadie Smith, John Mortimer, F. Scott Fitzgerald, Roger McGough, Ian Kershaw, Gabriel García Márquez, Steven Runciman, Sue Townsend, Primo Levi, Alistair Cooke, William Boyd, Robert Graves, Melissa Bank, Truman Capote, David Lodge, Anton Chekhov, Claire Tomalin, David Cannadine, P. G. Wodehouse, Franz Kafka, Dave Eggers, Evelyn Waugh, Pat Barker, Jonathan Coe, John Steinbeck and Alain de Botton.

== See also ==
- Penguin Crime & Espionage
- Penguin Essentials
- Penguin Red Classics
