= A Parisian Affair =

1881 short story by Guy de Maupassant

- Cover of Penguin Classics edition (2004)
- Author: Guy de Maupassant
- Original title: Une aventure parisienne
- Translator: Siân Miles
- Language: French
- Publisher: Gil Blas, Penguin Books
- Publication date: 22 December 1881
- English publication date: 2004
- Pages: 322 (U.K. first edition)

A Parisian Affair (French: Une aventure parisienne) is a short story by Guy de Maupassant, first published in French in 1881, and published in English as a collection of short stories, by Penguin Classics in 2004. It was republished by Pocket Penguins in 2016.
