= The Lady and the Little Fox Fur =

1965 novel by Violette Leduc

- Cover of Peter Owen edition (2006)
- Author: Violette Leduc
- Original title: La Femme au petit renard
- Translator: Derek Coltman
- Publication date: 1965
- English publication date: 1967
- ISBN: 9780720612172 (Peter Owen edition, 2006)

The Lady and the Little Fox Fur is a novel by French author Violette Leduc. It was first published in French as La Femme au petit renard in 1965. It was released in English by Peter Owen in 1967, and rereleased by them in 2006. In 2018, a new version was released by Penguin European Writers, with an introduction by Deborah Levy.
