= A Burnt Child =

1948 novel by Stig Dagerman

- First edition (Swedish)
- Author: Stig Dagerman
- Original title: Bränt barn
- Publisher: Norstedts, William Morrow and Company
- Publication date: 1948
- English publication date: 1950
- ISBN: 978-0-241-40073-9 (Penguin European Writers edition, 2019)
- Website: dagerman.us/book/a-moth-to-a-flame

A Burnt Child (Bränt barn) is a novel by the Swedish author Stig Dagerman, published in 1948.

It is Dagerman's most widely read novel both in Sweden, where it has been published in ten editions, and internationally, with translations to twenty languages. The original title derives from the Swedish proverb "Bränt barn skyr elden" ("A burnt child dreads the fire").

An English translation of A Burnt Child was first published in 1950. In 2019, a translation of the novel was published by Penguin European Writers with the title A Moth to a Flame with a preface by Siri Hustvedt.

== Plot summary ==
Set in a working-class Stockholm neighbourhood, the novel opens with the funeral of Alma, the mother of 20 year old, sometime student, Bengt. A sensitive and introspective young man, Bengt is profoundly affected by his mother's death, and his grief is compounded by feelings of guilt. He blames himself for her death, believing that he failed her in some way. This sense of guilt becomes a central theme in the novel, driving much of Bengt's subsequent actions and psychological torment. A badly-timed phone call at the funeral dinner, from an unmistakably female voice, leads Bengt to question his father's fidelity.

After his wife's death, Bengt's father, a rather pragmatic and emotionally distant man, quickly remarries. This new marriage introduces Gun, the father's young and attractive wife, into Bengt's life. Gun's presence becomes the focal point of Bengt's emotional and psychological turmoil. After discovering that his father did have a mistress and has now married this mistress, the apathetic Bengt sets out to avenge his mother's memory. He is initially repelled by Gun, seeing her as a usurper of his mother's place and a symbol of his father's apparent callousness. However, as time progresses, Bengt finds himself increasingly drawn to Gun in a way that disturbs and confuses him.

Bengt's relationship with Gun is marked by a toxic and obsessive dynamic. He oscillates between trying to drive a wedge between her and his father and being irresistibly attracted to her. This obsession gradually takes over his life, affecting his relationships with others, including his girlfriend, Berit, whom he treats with a mixture of neglect and cruelty as his fixation on Gun intensifies. Bengt's inner conflict is further exacerbated by his unresolved grief over his mother’s death, which he has never truly come to terms with.

== Critical reception ==
"This is a writer who sees life, and especially family life, under a burning glass; and the result is a novel of extraordinary power. It is an absorbing work." — The Observer, Review 1950

"A literary giant in Sweden, Dagerman conjures a Strindbergian atmosphere of shadowy menace in his brief, intense novel, A Moth to a Flame... The novel absorbs the reader effortlessly... The landscape round Stockholm, with its fog-bound flatlands and grey winter seas, is vividly evoked. This moody, death-haunted novel is well worth reading." — Evening Standard 2019

== Adaptations ==
In 1949 Dagerman adapted the novel to the stage play Ingen går fri ("Nobody Walks Free"), which he directed himself. The novel has been filmed twice, the Swedish Bränt barn in 1967 and The French L'enfant brulé in 1991.
