= Women (Sebastian novel) =

1933 novel by Mihail Sebastian

- Cover of Aurora Metro Books edition (2019)
- Author: Mihail Sebastian
- Original title: Femei
- Translator: Gabi Reigh; Philip Ó Ceallaigh
- Publication date: 1933
- English publication date: 2019
- ISBN: 9781912430314

Women is a novel by Romanian author Mihail Sebastian. It was first published in Romanian as Femei in 1933. It was released in English in 2019 by Aurora Metro Books (U.K., translated by Gabi Reigh) and Other Press (U.S.A., translated by Philip Ó Ceallaigh). It was rereleased by Penguin European Writers in 2020.

Women is in four parts, presented chronologically, each focusing on a different stage in the life of Stefan Valeriu, and the women in his life then. Together the parts form a portrait of life in interwar Europe.
