= A Start in Life (Brookner novel) =

Novel by Anita Brookner

- First edition
- Author: Anita Brookner
- Publisher: Jonathan Cape
- Publication date: 1981
- Pages: 176
- ISBN: 022401899X
- Dewey Decimal: 823/.9/1

A Start in Life is the first novel by Anita Brookner. It was first published by Cape in 1981. Its U.S. title was The Debut. The book was rereleased by Penguin Essentials in 2017.
