= Christopher Darden =

American lawyer (born 1956)

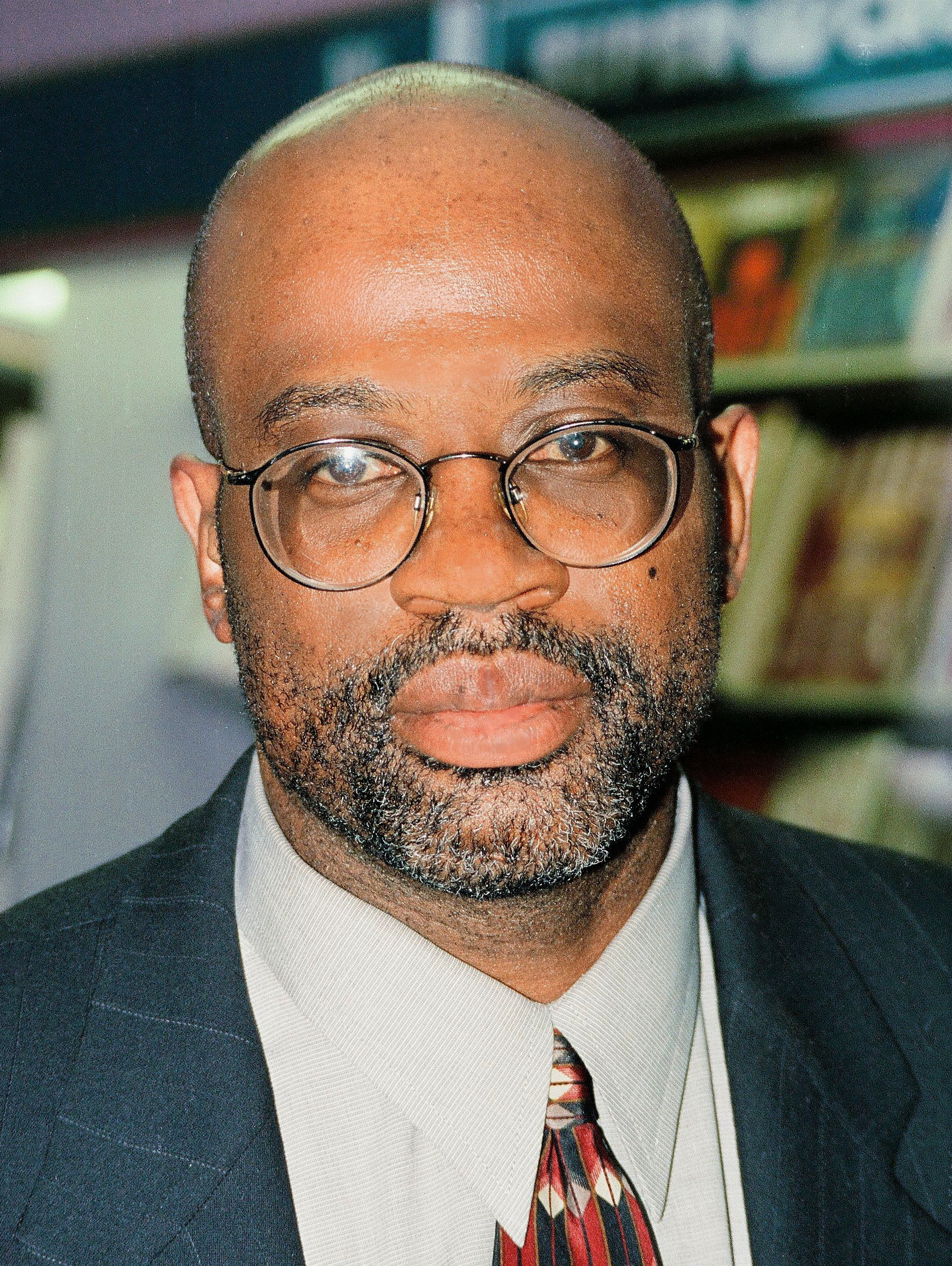
- Darden in 1995
- Born: Christopher Allen Darden; April 7, 1956 (age 70); Richmond, California, U.S.
- Education: San Jose State University (BS); University of California, Hastings (JD)
- Occupations: Attorney; author; television correspondent
- Years active: 1980–present
- Political party: Democratic
- Other political affiliations: Republican (Former)
- Spouse: Marcia Carter (m. 1997)
- Children: 5
- Website: www.christopherdardenforjudge.com

Christopher Allen Darden (born April 7, 1956) is an American lawyer, author, and lecturer. He worked for 15 years in the Los Angeles County District Attorney's office, where he gained national attention as a co-prosecutor in the murder trial of O. J. Simpson.

== Early life and education ==
Darden was born in Richmond, California, the fourth of eight siblings. After graduating from John F. Kennedy High School in 1974, Darden enrolled at San Jose State University, where he participated in track and field and joined Alpha Phi Alpha, an African-American fraternity. He received his B.S. in criminal justice administration in 1977. Darden received his Juris Doctor from the University of California, Hastings, in 1980.

== Career ==
Darden took and passed the California Bar Exam in the summer of 1980. Four months afterward, he was hired at the National Labor Relations Board in Los Angeles. Looking for a career change, he applied for and was hired for a position with the Los Angeles County District Attorney's Office. Darden was initially assigned to the Huntington Park office before moving on to Beverly Hills, and finally moved to the Criminal Courts Building (CCB) in downtown Los Angeles in late 1983.

During his tenure as a prosecutor at the CCB, Darden served in the central trials and hardcore gang units before transferring to the Special Investigation Division (SID), which investigates criminal activity by public and law enforcement officials, in February 1988. It was in this position that Darden first met Johnnie Cochran, who represented some victims of alleged police violence. Darden and Cochran became close friends, with Darden seeing Cochran as a mentor figure.

Darden initially became involved in the murder trial of O. J. Simpson after being asked by Deputy District Attorneys Marcia Clark and William Hodgman to lead the prosecution of Al Cowlings, Simpson's friend and the driver of the white Ford Bronco during the infamous car chase. After Darden's work on the Cowlings case ended, Clark requested Darden join the Simpson team as case manager since she and Hodgman were bogged down by various motions and filings from the defense. Darden was also tasked by Clark to prepare the prosecution's witnesses for testimony, including preparing testimony for key witness Detective Mark Fuhrman. After Hodgman was incapacited by stress-related illness shortly before opening statements, Darden was named co-prosecutor. Darden's friendship with Cochran, who was a prominent figure on Simpson's defense team, became heavily strained due to their clashing positions regarding the inclusion of racism in the case. Simpson was ultimately acquitted. Darden incidentally normalized the term N-word, a euphemistic alternative reference to the word "nigger", as the first public figure to use that term, while cross-examining Fuhrman.

Darden left the District Attorney's office after the Simpson case and joined the faculty of the Southwestern University School of Law. Darden taught and specialized in criminal procedure and trial advocacy.

Darden is a former legal commentator for CNBC, CNN, Court TV, and NBC, and a frequent guest and commentator on CNN, Court TV, and Fox News Network. He has made guest appearances on Touched by an Angel, Girlfriends, The Tonight Show with Jay Leno, The Howard Stern Show, Muppets Tonight, Roseanne, the movie Liar Liar (uncredited), and the TV movie One Hot Summer Night (in which he plays a disgruntled policeman). He is the former principal attorney in the syndicated legal show Power of Attorney.

Darden is also a writer. In addition to In Contempt, which chronicles his experiences with the Simpson trial, he co-authored (with Dick Lochte) a number of crime novels, including The Trials of Nikki Hill (1999), LA Justice (2000), and The Last Defense (2002).

He appeared on the cover of Newsweek in 1996 with an article "My Case Against O.J.", which addressed his involvement and prosecution of Simpson.

Darden left the law school in 1999 and started his own firm, Darden & Associates, Inc., specializing in criminal defense and civil litigation. In December 2007, he was considered for a judgeship by California Governor Arnold Schwarzenegger.

In an interview by Oprah Winfrey that aired February 9, 2006, Darden stated that he still believed Simpson was guilty. He added that he was nearly as disgusted with the perjury of Mark Fuhrman as by the murders of Goldman and Simpson.

On September 6, 2012, Darden accused deceased Simpson defense lawyer Johnnie Cochran of "'manipulating' one of the infamous gloves", a claim Alan Dershowitz has called "a total fabrication", saying, "the defense doesn't get access to evidence except under controlled circumstances."

Darden represented Eric Ronald Holder Jr. in his arraignment on April 4, 2019. Darden entered a not guilty plea on behalf of Holder, who is accused of murdering Nipsey Hussle. Darden dropped out of the case May 10, the same day as the court date. Darden received multiple death threats for representing Holder.

As of April 2020, Darden is representing a man accused of pulling a knife on a television crew at a COVID-19 anti-lockdown protest rally in Huntington Beach and forcing them to delete footage.

It was reported in August 2020 that Darden would briefly represent Corey Walker for arraignment, the alleged killer of rapper Pop Smoke.

Darden ran for judge in Los Angeles County Superior Court in 2024, but lost to Leslie Gutierrez.

== Personal life ==
Darden married TV executive Marcia Carter on August 31, 1997. They have three children, with Darden having two children before their marriage.

== Honors and awards ==
- In 1998, Darden received the Crystal Heart Award from Loved Ones of Homicide Victims, an organization devoted to aiding families that have suffered the loss of loved ones as a result of violence.
- In 2000, he was recognized as "Humanitarian of the Year" by Eli Horne, a California shelter for abused children and women.

== In popular culture ==
- Darden and Marcia Clark were parodied in the sitcom Unbreakable Kimmy Schmidt.
- In The People v. O.J. Simpson: American Crime Story (2016), Darden was portrayed by Sterling K. Brown.
- Darden and Marcia Clark were mentioned in the lyrics by T-Mo of the hip-hop group Goodie Mob in the song "Soul Food" with "Fuck Chris Darden, fuck Marcia Clark/Taking us when we're in the spotlight for a joke."
- In 1997, Darden made an appearance on The Howard Stern Show by running the question board for Jeopardy. Also appearing were Geraldo Rivera and Richard Belzer.
- Darden was featured via archive footage in Ezra Edelman's 2016 documentary O.J.: Made in America, which focused on the life and murder trial of O.J. Simpson. Darden was contacted by Edelman to participate in the documentary, but Darden declined.
