= Hotel du Lac =

1984 novel by Anita Brookner

- First edition cover
- Author: Anita Brookner
- Cover artist: Susan Moxley
- Language: English
- Publisher: Jonathan Cape (UK); Pantheon (USA)
- Publication date: 6 September 1984
- Publication place: United Kingdom
- Media type: Print (Hardback & Paperback)
- Pages: 184 pp (hardback edition)
- ISBN: 0-679-75932-8
- OCLC: 33411117

Hotel du Lac is a 1984 novel by English writer Anita Brookner. It centres on Edith Hope, a romance novelist staying in a hotel on the shores of Lake Geneva. There she meets other English visitors, including Mrs Pusey, Mrs Pusey's daughter Jennifer, and an attractive middle-aged man, Mr Neville.

It won the 1984 Booker Prize. It was adapted into a television film of the same name in 1986.

== Plot ==
Edith reaches Hotel du Lac in a state of bewildered confusion at the turn of events in her life. After a secret and often lonely affair with a married man and an aborted marriage, her friends banished her. They advise her to go on "probation" to "grow up," "be a woman", and atone for her mistakes.

Edith comes to the hotel swearing not to change. However, the hotel's silent charms and her observations of the guests there all tug at Edith with questions about her identity, forcing her to examine who she is and what she has been. At the hotel, she observes people from different walks of life — wealthy Mrs Pusey and her daughter Jennifer, their love for each other, and the splendid oblivious lives they live; Mme de Bonneuil, who lives at the hotel in solitary expulsion from her chateau, now inhabited by her son and his wife; and Monica, who came to the hotel acceding to her husband's demands to fix her "eating disorder" and become fertile enough to bear him an heir.

Edith falls for the ambiguous smile of Mr Neville, a wealthy technology company owner, who asks for her hand in marriage. Neville is looking for a "safe" wife who will maintain his mansion as a home and social venue, instead of running off with another man like his ex-wife. He offers to install her there and turn a blind eye to any lovers she might take. Edith considers a life of recognition that marrying Neville would confer upon her. Still, she ultimately rejects the possibility of a relationship with him when she realises he is an incorrigible womaniser. This also finally leads her to realise what her life is expected to be. Once again, she breaks chains, takes things into her own hands and leaves Hotel du Lac.

Throughout the novel, Edith writes letters addressed to her lover, David, describing her companions. When about to accept Neville's proposal, she writes a final letter of farewell, noting that is the last she will write, and the first she will actually send. But after seeing Neville emerge from the Puseys' room in his dressing gown, she tears it up and sends a telegram to David consisting of one word: "Returning."

== Reception ==
A 1984 book review by Kirkus Reviews called the book a "sad little comedy", summarizing it as "less subtle, more artificial than Brookner's three previous, similar character-portraits: the themes are laid on thick... Still, for readers who relish a blend of extra-dry humor, tartly wistful introspection, and literary self-consciousness, this small entertainment—winner of England's Booker Prize—will be a delicate, provocative pleasure." Writing for The New York Times, Anne Tyler called it "Brookner's most absorbing novel" and praised the book for its tone: "oddly detached, very small-scale, faintly humorous".

According to The Guardian, the book drew a lot of flak for its Booker Prize win for having "beaten a better book." Malcolm Bradbury wrote that Hotel du Lac was not the kind of book that should have won the prize. Even Brookner herself publicly suggested that it would have been better if J. G. Ballard's Empire of the Sun had won instead. Although it was considered a surprise winner, it was one of the top ten bestselling books of the 1980s.

== Awards ==
The novel won the Booker Prize in 1984.

On receiving the announcement of her book's win, Brookner is believed to have said, "I think I shall go out and get a pair of shoes resoled. That will help me keep my feet on the ground."

== Television film ==
An adaptation by Christopher Hampton for a television film of the same name was produced by the BBC and A&E Television Networks and first screened in 1986. It starred Anna Massey and Denholm Elliott.
