= The Beautiful Summer =

1949 Italian novel

- 1950 edition
- Author: Cesare Pavese
- Original title: La bella estate
- Translator: W.J. Strachan
- Publisher: Peter Owen
- Publication date: 1949
- English publication date: 1955
- Pages: 237
- ISBN: 9780241983393 (Penguin European Writers edition, 2018)

The Beautiful Summer is a novel by Italian author Cesare Pavese, first published in Italian as La bella estate in 1949.

The book is an account of juvenile love, hope and defeat in 1930s northern Italy. It comprises three novellas: the eponymous The Beautiful Summer (La bella estate, first published in 1940), The devil in the Hills (Il diavolo sulle colline, 1948) and Women on Their Own (Tra donne sole, 1949).

The book won the Strega Prize, the most prestigious Italian literary award, in 1950. It was released in English by Peter Owen in 1955, and rereleased by Penguin European Writers in 2018.

In 1961 the book’s Italian publisher Einaudi, publishing every Pavese work together for the first time, decided to include the writer's nine novels in two volumes, in the order in which they were written in instead of the one they were published in. The Beautiful Summer is therefore part of the first volume.

Even if the three compositions can be classified as completely different works because of their contents, they cover the same main themes: the transition from adolescence to maturity through exploring, discovering, and then disappointment and defeat. In the three novels the weakest, youngest and unexperienced character is the one who experiences their growth’s transition the most; they also share a tendency to pushing limits which manifests itself through rebellion and having suicidal thoughts. The typical urban-rural divide is also dealt with; here, unlike other works, the action is centered in an urban setting.

== Adaptations ==
Every single one of the three novels has been adapted, more or less freely interpreted, to movies or TV shows.

- Le amiche, a 1955 Italian film directed by Michelangelo Antonioni, is based on the last novella of the book, Among Women Only.
- Il diavolo sulle colline, 1985 TV movie directed by Vittorio Cottafavi.
- The Beautiful Summer, a 2023 Italian film directed by Laura Luchetti, is based on the first novella of the book.
