= Green Ideas =

Series of books

Green Ideas is a series of books published by Penguin Books in the UK, on environmental subjects. The series began in 2021, and contains twenty short books.

== Books ==
#	Author	Title
1	Greta Thunberg	No One Is Too Small to Make a Difference
2	Naomi Klein	Hot Money
3	Timothy Morton	All Art Is Ecological
4	George Monbiot	This Can't Be Happening
5	Bill McKibben	An Idea Can Go Extinct
6	Amitav Ghosh	Uncanny and Improbable Events
7	Tim Flannery	A Warning from the Golden Toad
8	Terry Tempest Williams	The Clan of One-Breasted Women
9	Michael Pollan	Food Rules
10	Robin Wall Kimmerer	The Democracy of Species
11	Dai Qing	The Most Dammed Country in the World
12	Wangari Maathai	The World We Once Lived In
13	Jared Diamond	The Last Tree on Easter Island
14	Wendell Berry	What I Stand for Is What I Stand On
15	Edward O. Wilson	Every Species is a Masterpiece
16	James Lovelock	We Belong to Gaia
17	Masanobu Fukuoka	The Dragonfly Will Be the Messiah
18	Arne Næss	There is No Point of No Return
19	Rachel Carson	Man's War Against Nature
20	Aldo Leopold	Think Like a Mountain

== See also ==
- Penguin Essentials
