= Anita Brookner =

English novelist and art historian (1928–2016)

Anita Brookner CBE
- Born: 16 July 1928; Herne Hill, London, England
- Died: 10 March 2016 (aged 87); London, England
- Education: King's College London
- Occupations: Art historian; novelist
- Writing career
- Period: 1981–2011
- Genre: Drama
- Notable work: Hotel du Lac

Anita Brookner (16 July 1928 – 10 March 2016) was an English novelist and art historian. She was Slade Professor of Fine Art at the University of Cambridge from 1967 to 1968 and was the first woman to hold this visiting professorship. She was awarded the 1984 Booker–McConnell Prize for her novel Hotel du Lac.

== Life and education ==
Brookner (Bruckner) was born in Herne Hill, a suburb of London. She was the only child of Newson Bruckner, a Jewish immigrant from Piotrków Trybunalski in Poland, and Maude Schiska, a singer whose grandfather had emigrated from Warsaw, Poland, and founded a tobacco factory at which her husband worked after arriving in Britain aged 18. Her mother gave up her singing career when she married and, according to her daughter, was unhappy for the rest of her life. Maude changed the family's surname to Brookner because of anti-German sentiment in Britain following World War I. Anita Brookner had a lonely childhood, although her grandmother and uncle lived with the family, and her parents, secular Jews, opened their house to Jewish refugees fleeing the Germans during the 1930s and World War II. "I have said that I am one of the loneliest women in London", she said in her Paris Review interview in 1987.

She was educated at the James Allen's Girls' School, a fee-paying school. In 1949 she received a BA in history from King's College London, and in 1953 a doctorate in art history from the Courtauld Institute of Art, University of London. Under the supervision of Anthony Blunt, then director of the Courtauld, what was originally a master's thesis on the French genre painter Jean-Baptiste Greuze was upgraded to a doctorate. She received a French government scholarship in 1950 to the École du Louvre and spent most of the decade living in Paris, where, she would say, she had been happiest.

== Career ==
=== Academic ===
In 1967, she became the first woman to hold the Slade Professorship of Fine Art at Cambridge University. She was a visiting lecturer at Reading University from 1959 to 1964 when she became a lecturer at the Courtauld Institute of Art. She was promoted to Reader at the Courtauld in 1977, where she worked until her retirement in 1988. She began her career as a specialist on 18th century French art but later extended her expertise to the romantics. She contributed articles to ArtReview in the late 1950s and early 1960s,

Among her students at the Courtauld was art historian Olivier Berggruen, whose graduate work she advised. She was a fellow of King's College London and of New Hall, Cambridge (Murray Edwards College since 2008).

Photographs taken by Brookner are held in the Conway Library of art and architecture at the Courtauld Institute.

=== Novelist ===
Brookner published her first novel, A Start in Life (1981), at the age of 53. Thereafter she published roughly one a year. Brookner was regarded as a stylist. Her novels explore themes of emotional loss and difficulties associated with fitting into society, and intellectual, middle-class women, who suffer isolation and disappointments in love. Many of her characters are the children of European immigrants to Britain; a number appear to be of Jewish descent. Hotel du Lac (1984), her fourth novel, was awarded the Booker Prize.

== Private life and honours ==
Brookner never married; she took care of her parents as they aged. Brookner commented in one interview that she had received several proposals of marriage, but rejected all of them, concluding that men were "people with their own agenda, who think you might be fitted in if they lop off certain parts. You can see them coming a mile off". She gave the 1974 Aspects of Art Lecture. In 1990, she was appointed a Commander of the Order of the British Empire (CBE). She died in the Royal Borough of Kensington and Chelsea, London, on 10 March 2016, at the age of 87.

Hermione Lee's 2026 book, Anita Brookner: Art & Life, opens with an epigraph from Brookner's Incidents in the Rue Laugier: "The dead, perhaps even more than the living, have a right to their mysteries."

== Publications ==
- Greuze, 1725–1805: The Rise and Fall of an Eighteenth-century Phenomenon (1972) – on Jean-Baptiste Greuze
- Jacques-Louis David (1980) – on the history painter Jacques-Louis David
- A Start in Life (1981) – U.S. title The Debut
- Providence (1982)
- Look at Me (1983)
- Hotel du Lac (1984) – Booker Prize winner
- Family and Friends (1985)
- A Misalliance (1986)
- A Friend from England (1987)
- Latecomers (1988)
- Lewis Percy (1989)
- Brief Lives (1990)
- A Closed Eye (1991)
- Fraud (1992)
- A Family Romance (1993) – U.S. title Dolly
- A Private View (1994)
- Incidents in the Rue Laugier (1995)
- Altered States (1996)
- Visitors (1997)
- Soundings (1997) – collection of essays
- Falling Slowly (1998)
- Undue Influence (1999)
- Romanticism and its Discontents (2000) – a study of French romanticism
- The Bay of Angels (2001)
- The Next Big Thing (2002) – U.S. title Making Things Better, longlisted for the Booker Prize
- The Rules of Engagement (2003)
- Leaving Home (2005)
- Strangers (2009) – shortlisted for James Tait Black Memorial Prize
- At the Hairdresser (2011) – novella available only as an e-book

== See also ==
- Women in the art history field
