= Dan Zakhem =

Israeli performance artist (1958–1994)

- דן זקהיים
- Born: Dani Zakhem; 13 May 1958; Tel Aviv, Israel
- Died: 22 February 1994 (aged 35); Israel
- Occupations: Sculptor; performance artist
- Years active: 1973–1994
- Relatives: Esti Zakhem (sister)

Dan Zakhem (Hebrew: דן זקהיים; 13 May 1958 – 22 February 1994) was an Israeli performance artist and sculptor.

== Biography ==
Dan Zakhem was born in Tel Aviv in 1958. From 1983 to 1985, after returning from studying art in Montreal, Quebec, Canada, he worked as an art director and graphic designer. In 1988 he established, together with Tamar Raban and Anat Schen, an organization called "Shelter 209", a non-profit organization for the advancement of performance art in Israel.

Alongside ceremonial and shamanistic performances, such as "Falling Asleep on a Forest's Nipple" (1985), he created performances with post-modern artificial and spectacular characteristics, such as "The Babel Party" (1984).

In many of his works, he created deliberate blurring between art and life. In 1986, he was diagnosed with HIV. This experience influenced a series of works in which the ballet of death became a central motif.

== Death ==
In 1994, he died of a brain tumor caused by AIDS.

== Education ==
- 1974–76 Talma-Yalin High School, Givatayim, Israel
- 1978–79 Classical Ballet, Bat Dor, Tel Aviv, Israel
- 1979–82 B.F.A. Major Studio Arts, Concordia University, Montreal, Quebec, Canada
- 1983 Gray Adams Steps Schools, New York City
- 1983 Fashion, television, theatre make-up, Audrey Morris & Co, Montreal, Quebec, Canada

== Teaching ==
- 1990 Art Teachers College, Ramat Hasharon, multimedia

== Prizes ==
- 1987 Second prize, for the performance "Impressions from Above: a Phenomenon", Israel Festival, Jerusalem
- 1991 Young Artist Prize, The Ministry of Education, Culture and Sport

== Selected performances ==
- 1980 "Maskself" Studio A, Concordia University Montreal, Quebec, Canada
- 1980 "Lilliput" Lilliput Antique Store, Tel Aviv, Israel
- 1981 "Neither Here nor There. First going away performance." Vehicule Art Gallery, Montreal, Quebec, Canada
- 1982 "Dan Zakhem" Tangente Gallery, Montreal, Quebec, Canada
- 1982 "Hurluberlu Hymn" Musak, Noise Sound Festival. Vehicule Art Gallery, Montreal, Quebec, Canada
- 1982 "Conspiracy" 5th International Apartment Festival. Westbeth Center, New York
- 1982 "Street Talk" Ground Zero Week, Montreal, Quebec, Canada
- 1982 "Sketches for Biographical Borders" Centre Calixa Lavallee, Montreal, Quebec, Canada
- 1983 "Development of Sketches for Biographical Borders" In collaboration with Esty Zakheim, Acre Fringe Theater Festival, Israel
- 1983 "Negative Mold Extension" Ahad Ha'am 90 Gallery, Tel Aviv, Israel
- 1984 "The Babel Party: a fictitious political party" Tel Aviv, Israel
- 1984 "Babel with White in the Center" Tel Aviv, Israel
- 1984 "Explosion at Midnight" Acre Fringe Theater Festival, Israel
- 1985 "To Be Dragged into Politics in the Field" Nitzana Terminal Israel-Egypt Border (in collaboration with Anat Schen and Yadid Rubin)
- 1985 "Shuby Duby Zoo-Musiperfomance" (in collaboration with Anat Schen) Kibbutz Shefayim Cultural Center, Israel
- 1985 "Napping on a Forest’s Nipple" Nature Project #5, Ness Harim Forest, Israel
- 1985 "Made in Israel" (transliterated) Jaffa Port, Israel
- 1985 "Flings-A Post-Modernist Soiree" Tzavta Club Theater, Tel Aviv, Israel
- 1987 "Impressions from Above-A Phenomenon" 2nd Prize Festival Israel, Jerusalem, Israel
- 1988 "Babel-come Back in Real Time" Zman Amiti Night Club, Tel Aviv, Israel
- 1988 "Ninji the Gingy" Shelter 209, Tel Aviv, Israel
- 1989 "Fat Freckles in the Sky". Shelter 209, Tel Aviv, Israel
- 1990 "Dennis the Menace-Nomade", Jerusalem Festival, Shelter 209, Ramat Aviv, Simultaneous performances with Tamar Raban and Anat Schen.
- 1990 "Sham-Po" (there-Here) Nature Project Ness Harim Forest, Israel
- 1991 "The Majesty of Absence", Rosh Dada.Installation/Performance. Shelter 209 Artists at Ein Hod Museum, Israel.
- 1991 "A la Dada- Hommage to the Dada Movement", Performances and poetry, French Institute Tel Aviv
- 1993 "Place and Mainstream" Performance, Hara Museum, Tokyo, Japan
- 1993 "Made in Israel" Performance, Jaffa Port, Tel Aviv
- 1993 "Life-Life". On going Performance with Tamar Raban, Borochov Gallery, Tel Aviv, Israel

== Selected exhibitions ==
- 1980 "Divided by 8-Plancher" Bourget Gallery Montreal
- 1981 Installation. Bourget Gallery, Montreal, Quebec, Canada
- 1982–83 "Meating" First International Shoebox Sculpture Exhibition (Travelling exhibition). Manoa Art Gallery at the University of Hawaii, Honolulu.
- 1985 "To Be Dragged into Politics" Installation.With Anat Schen. New Israeli Art at Dizengoff Center. Tel Aviv, Israel
- 1987 "Under the Tree" Environmental Installation. Meir Park, Tel Aviv
- 1989 "Mask-Sculpture" Hakikar Gallery, Old Jaffa, Israel
- 1989 "Objects from Performances" (Shelter 209 Group) Kalisher No. 5 Gallery, Tel Aviv
- 1990 "Myth- Here" Nature Project No. 7, Ness Harim Forest, Jerusalem, Israel
- 1991 "5 Masks" Installation, Youth Wing, Israel Museum, Jerusalem
- 1992 "Programe for an Archeological Find", Field Installation, Ein Hod, Israel
- 1993 "Site for Archeological Finds #2", Installation. Bat Yam Museum, Israel
- 1993 "Since May 13th, 1958". " Who is afraid of Kitsch?" Installation. Bat Yam Museum, Israel
- 1993 "Archeological Finds #2", Bat Yam Museum, Israel
- 1993 "Bear with me and Lot's of Lost", Self Portraits Photo project, Ha'ir News Paper, Tel Aviv
- 1993 "Untitled", Sculpture. Artist House Tel Aviv
