= Violette Leduc =

French writer (1907–1972)

- Born: 7 April 1907; Arras, Pas-de-Calais, France
- Died: 28 May 1972 (aged 65); Faucon, Vaucluse, France

Violette Leduc (7 April 1907 – 28 May 1972) was a French writer.

== Early life and education ==
She was born in Arras, Pas de Calais, France, on 7 April 1907. She was the illegitimate daughter of a servant girl, Berthe Leduc, and André Debaralle, the son of a rich Protestant family in Valenciennes, who refused to legitimize her. In Valenciennes, Violette spent most of her childhood suffering from poor self-esteem, exacerbated by her mother's hostility and excessive protectiveness. She developed tender friendships with her grandmother Fideline and her maternal aunt Laure. Her grandmother died when Leduc was a young child.

Her formal education began in 1913, but was interrupted by World War I. After the war, she went to a boarding school, the Collège de Douai, where she experienced lesbian affairs with her classmate "Isabelle P", which Leduc later adapted into the first part of her novel Ravages, and then the 1966 Thérèse et Isabelle. During her time at the Collège de Douai, she was introduced to what would become her first literary passions: the Russian classics, then Cocteau, Duhamel, Gide, Proust, and Rimbaud.

In 1925, Leduc embarked on an affair with a supervisor at the Collège, Denise Hertgès, four years her senior. The affair was later discovered, and Hertgès was dismissed from her job over the incident.

== Career and personal life ==
In 1926, Leduc moved to Paris, along with her mother and stepfather, and enrolled in the Lycée Racine. The same year, she failed her baccalaureate exam, and began working as a press cuttings clerk and secretary at Plon publishers, later becoming a writer of news pieces about their publications. She continued to live with Hertgès for nine years in the suburbs of Paris. Violette's mother Berthe encouraged her homosexual relations, believing this would protect Violette from illegitimate pregnancy.

In 1927, Violette met Jacques Mercier, seven years her senior, in a cinema. Despite her involvement with Hertgès, Mercier continuously pursued Violette. This love triangle is the basis of the plot of Ravages, wherein Violette is represented by the character Thérèse, Mercier by Marc, and Hertgès by Cécile. Violette's relationship with Hertgès ended in 1935. In 1939, Violette married Mercier. Their marriage was unsuccessful, and they separated. During their separation, Violette discovered that she was pregnant, and almost lost her life during an abortion.

In 1938, she met Maurice Sachs (future author of Le Sabbat), and in 1942, he took Violette to Normandy, where she wrote the manuscript of L'Asphyxie. During this time, Violette was also involved with trading on the black market, which allowed her to make a living. In 1944, Violette saw Simone de Beauvoir, and in 1945, Violette gave Beauvoir a copy of the manuscript of L'Asphyxie. This interaction formed the basis of a friendship and mentorship between her and Beauvoir that lasted for the rest of her life. Her first novel, L'Asphyxie (In the Prison of Her Skin), was published by Albert Camus for Éditions Gallimard, and earned her praise from Jean-Paul Sartre, Jean Cocteau, and Jean Genet. Her friendship and love of Maurice Sachs is detailed in her autobiography, La Bâtarde.

In 1955, Violette published her novel Ravages with Gallimard, but the editor censored the first 150-page section of the book, which depicts Violette's sexual encounters and defloration with her female classmate; Isabelle P. Gallimard censored this section by labelling it obscene. The censored part was eventually published as a separate novella, Thérèse and Isabelle, in 1966. Another novel, Le Taxi, caused controversy because of its depiction of incest between a brother and a sister. Critic Edith J. Benkov compared this novel with the work of Marguerite Duras and Nathalie Sarraute.

=== La Bâtarde ===
Leduc's best-known book, the memoir La Bâtarde, was published in 1964. An English translation coming out the year after. The autobiography was re-issued in 1997 by Riverhead books at a time when memoirs were doing well on the market, particularly when they included what was considered scandalous content at the time. Leduc’s autobiographical writing definitely fit the bill, tackling subjects such as illegitimacy, prostitution, abortion, theft, homosexuality, explicit sexual content, and self-hatred. La Bâtarde follows Leduc’s life from her birth in 1907 to the end of WWII, and explores her relationship with her mother, her relationships with men and women, and her trafficking of goods on the black market during the Occupation. The book also charts Leduc’s developing relationship to literature, describing key moments that influenced her understanding and approach to writing.Throughout the book, Leduc’s interaction with literature is connected to her identification with her father André, who was an avid reader and who abandoned her mother, Berthe.Leduc’s view of her father is complicated by the perspective of her younger self and her older, narrative voice. While Leduc recounts instances in her youth where she identified with her father, her narration shows the perspective that she has gained as an adult, saying that “No, I want nothing to do with you, heredity." However when she was young Leduc felt compelled to take up her father’s place for her mother and was consistently aware of the reminder she represented of him. She felt acutely aware of the blame superimposed unto her by her mother, which should have been directed at André. This feeling of identification with her father and her existence as a representation of him for her mother is particularly clear after Berthe remarries, and Leduc feels the resentment that he stepfather holds toward her as a reminder of André: “I vaguely understood that he would have liked to have erased me. I was the weight of a great love, I was a dark spot on a white cloth.” Despite Leduc’s conflicting feelings toward her father and her identification with him, her relationship to literature is mediated through him and the figure of le séducteur: Literature is understood through a language of seduction that stems from Leduc’s understanding of the power and consequences of André’s seduction of her mother, Berthe. In La Bâtarde Leduc uses a vocabulary of seduction to describe the effect and appeal of books. She describes her first experience being touched by literature by saying that she “quivered finally for Chateaubriand, for Lucille.” This erotic vocabulary follows in a description of Leduc’s visit to a bookstore, where she was “attracted, intrigued, enchanted by the yellow covers of the Mercure de France books, by the white converse of the Gallimard books.” This relationship between seduction and literature follows Leduc through the book, and characterizes how she describes her relationships with various men and women throughout La Bâtarde as well as how she approaches writing as a process of seducing a reader.

==== Reception ====
Despite the lack of recognition that Leduc had received for her 20 preceding years of writing, La Bâtarde was very commercially successful when it first came out in France, with 170,000 copies having been sold only a few months after its release. The book was nominated for the Prix Goncourt and the Fémina. Though it won neither, as the juries of these literary prizes were in conflict over whether a book that dealt with such taboo themes should be awarded. Much of La Bâtarde’s success has been attributed to the influence of Simone de Beauvoir. Beauvoir was an important figure and mentor for Leduc, offering advice on her career as a writer and nurturing her self-respect and confidence as a writer. There is speculation over whether Leduc held romantic feelings for Beauvoir, though it is clear that she held a deep affection for her. In discussion of Beauvoir’s place in her life in La Folie en tête, Leduc says: “I shall never understand the meaning of the word love when it applies to her and to me. I do not love her as a mother, I do not love her as a sister, I do not love her as a friend, I do not love her as an enemy, I do not love her as someone absent, I do not love her as someone always close to me. I have never had, nor will I ever have, one second of intimacy with her. If I could no longer see her every other week, darkness would submerge me. She is my reason for living, without having ever made room for me in her life.” (pg. 156) Beauvoir herself acknowledged that she maintained a level of distance in her relationship with Leduc, firmly establishing the boundaries of a mentor/protégée relationship. In that role, Beauvoir was able to offer Leduc advice and feedback on her writing, becoming a part of Leduc’s process of writing La Bâtarde. She even suggested the title to Leduc, who was originally thinking of calling the autobiography La cage. The preface to La Bâtarde that Beauvoir wrote was an important factor in the book’s reception, bringing it into the public eye. Beauvoir’s preface can be located in a larger tradition of allographic prefaces, which offered the authority of a more established author to a lesser-known writer as a form of patronage. This genre of writing was more popular in the 19th century, though there were a few notable examples in the 20th, such as Jean-Paul Sartre’s preface to Nathalie Sarraute’s Portrait d’un inconnu. Beauvoir does not shy away from the more taboo parts of Leduc’s text but instead praises the raw elements of La Bâtarde and Leduc’s frank depiction of eroticism for their authenticity. She says of Leduc’s writing: “A woman delves into the most secret parts of herself, and she tells us about it with an unflinching sincerity as if there were no one listening to her.” The emphasis that Beauvoir places on Leduc’s sincerity in her autobiography mirrors the importance that she places on truth in her own autobiographical texts. In doing this, Beauvoir shows the correlation between Leduc’s autobiographical project and her own, offering her authority and praise to the text.

Leduc went on to write eight more books after La Bâtarde, including La Folie en tête (Mad in Pursuit), the second part of her literary autobiography.

In 1968, Radley Metzger made a film of Leduc's novel Thérèse and Isabelle. It is a commercial feature about adolescent lesbian love, starring Essy Persson and Anna Gael.

== Illness, death and legacy ==
Leduc developed breast cancer and died at the age of 65, after two operations. She was living at Faucon, Vaucluse, at the time of her death.

Violette is a 2013 French biographical drama film about Leduc. It was written and directed by Martin Provost and shown in the Special Presentation section at the 2013 Toronto International Film Festival.

== List of works ==
- L'Asphyxie, 1946 (In the Prison of Her Skin, trans. Derek Coltman, 1970).
- L'affamée, 1948.
- Ravages, 1955.
- La vieille fille et le mort, 1958.
- Trésors à prendre, suivi de Les Boutons dorés, 1960.
- La Bâtarde, 1964 (La Bâtarde, trans. Derek Coltman, 1965).
- La Femme au petit renard, 1965 (The Lady and the Little Fox Fur).
- Thérèse et Isabelle, 1966 (Thérèse and Isabelle, trans. Sophie Lewis, The Feminist Press, 2015. )
- La Folie en tête, 1970 (Mad in Pursuit, trans. Derek Coltman, 1971)
- Le Taxi, 1971 (The Taxi. Helen Weaver (translation). Hart-Davis MacGibbon. 1973. ISBN 9780246105851. OCLC 561312438.)
- La Chasse à l'amour, 1973.

== Sources ==
- Aldrich, Robert; Wotherspoon, Garry, eds. (2002). Who's Who in Gay and Lesbian History from Antiquity to World War II. Routledge; London. ISBN 0-415-15983-0.
- Beauvoir, Simone de; Le Bon de Beauvoir, Sylvie (1 October 2011). The Useless Mouths and Other Literary Writings. University of Illinois Press. ISBN 978-0-252-03634-7.
- De Courtivron, Isabelle (1986). "From Bastard to Pilgrim: Rites and Writing for Madame". Yale French Studies (72): 132. doi:10.2307/2930231. ISSN 0044-0078.
- De Courtivron, Isabelle; Leduc, Violette; Coltman, Derek (1997). "A Passion for the Impossible". The Women's Review of Books. 15 (3): 13. doi:10.2307/4022823. ISSN 0738-1433.
- English, Jeri (2010). "Literary Patronage: Collaboration or Rivalry? Women's Prefaces to Women's Texts in the 20 th Century". Women in French Studies. 2010 (1): 126–139. doi:10.1353/wfs.2010.0027. ISSN 2166-5486.
- Flanner, Janet (1977). Paris Journal : 1965 - 1971. Harvest (Harcourt Brace Jovanovich). pp. 10–13. ISBN 0-15-670951-1.
- Leduc, Violette; Coltman, Derek (1965). La bâtarde. New York: Riverhead Books.
