= Dick Lochte =

American writer

- Born: Richard Samuel Lochte; 19 October 1944 (age 81); New Orleans, U.S.A.
- Writing career
- Genre: Crime
- Website: www.dicklochte.com

Richard Samuel Lochte, known as Dick Lochte (born 19 October 1944), is an American writer of crime novels. His debut Sleeping Dog won the Nero Award in 1985 and was nominated for the Edgar Allan Poe Award for Best First Novel in 1986.
