= Cesare Pavese =

Italian writer, literary critic, and translator (1908–1950)

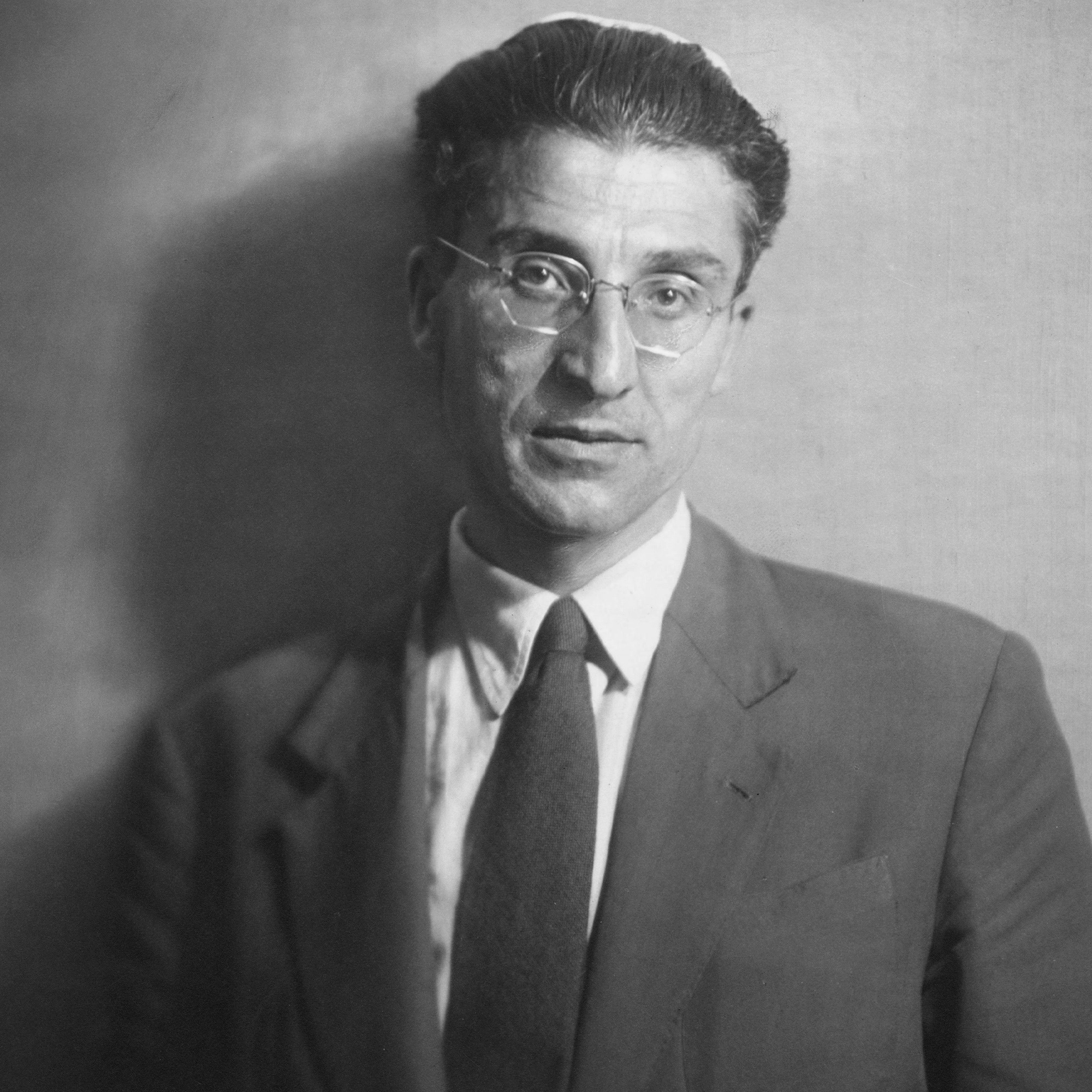
- Born: 9 September 1908; Santo Stefano Belbo, Piedmont, Kingdom of Italy
- Died: 27 August 1950 (aged 41); Turin, Piedmont, Italy
- Occupations: Novelist; poet; short story writer; translator; literary critic; essayist
- Writing career
- Notable works: Hard Labor; The Beautiful Summer; The Moon and the Bonfires

Cesare Pavese (UK: /pæˈveɪzeɪ, -zi/ pav-AY-zay, -zee, Italian: [ˈtʃeːzare paˈveːze, ˈtʃɛː-, -eːse]; 9 September 1908 – 27 August 1950) was an Italian novelist, poet, short story writer, translator, literary critic, and essayist. He is often referred to as one of the most influential Italian writers of his time.

Pavese was reportedly apolitical in the 1930s, but he was moving in antifascist circles. He served a short sentence as a political prisoner. Though eligible for drafting into the Italian Armed Forces during World War II, he did not see any active service. He spent part of the war hospitalized due to asthma. Many of his friends in Turin joined the partisans, but Pavese took no part in the armed struggle in the vicinity of the city. After the war, Pavese joined the Italian Communist Party and worked on the party's newspaper, L'Unità. Toward the end of his life, he was suffering from depression and political disillusionment. He died by suicide by an overdose of barbiturates.

== Early life and education ==
Cesare Pavese was born in Santo Stefano Belbo, in the province of Cuneo. It was the village where his father was born and where the family returned for the summer holidays each year. He started primary school in Santo Stefano Belbo, but the rest of his education was in schools in Turin.

He attended Liceo Classico Massimo d'Azeglio in Turin for his sixth form/senior high school studies. His most important teacher at the time was Augusto Monti, writer and educator, whose writing style attempted to be devoid of all rhetoric.

As a young man of letters, Pavese had a particular interest in English-language literature, graduating from the University of Turin with a thesis on the poetry of Walt Whitman. Among his mentors at the university was Leone Ginzburg, an expert on Russian literature and literary critic, husband of the writer Natalia Ginzburg and father of the future historian Carlo Ginzburg. In those years, Pavese translated both classic and recent American and British authors that were then new to the Italian public.

== Arrest and conviction; the war in Italy ==
Pavese, an apolitical person in highly politicized times, moved in antifascist circles. In 1935, he was arrested and convicted for having letters from a political prisoner. After a few months in prison, he was sent into confino, i.e. internal exile in Southern Italy, the commonly used sentence for those guilty of lesser political crimes. (Carlo Levi and Leone Ginzburg, also from Turin, were similarly sent into confino.) After a year spent in the Calabrian village of Brancaleone, Pavese returned to Turin, where he worked for the left-wing publisher Giulio Einaudi as editor and translator. Natalia Ginzburg also worked there.

Pavese was living in Rome when he was called up into the fascist army, but because of his asthma, he spent six months in a military hospital. When he returned to Turin, German troops occupied the streets, and most of his friends had left to fight as partisans. Pavese fled to the hills around Serralunga di Crea, near Casale Monferrato. He took no part in the armed struggle taking place in that area. During his years in Turin, he was the mentor of the young writer and translator Fernanda Pivano, his former student at the Liceo D'Azeglio. Pavese gave her the American edition of Spoon River Anthology, which came out in Pivano's Italian translation in 1943.

== After the war ==
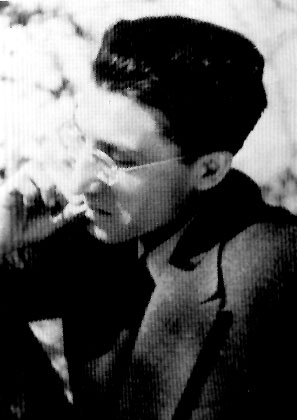
Portrait of Pavese

After World War II, Pavese joined the Italian Communist Party and worked on the party's newspaper, L'Unità. The bulk of his work was published during this time. Toward the end of his life, he would frequently visit Le Langhe, the area where he was born, where he found great solace. Depression, the failure of a brief love affair with the actress Constance Dowling, to whom his last novel and one of his last poems ("Death will come and she'll have your eyes") were dedicated, and political disillusionment led him to his suicide by an overdose of barbiturates in 1950. That year, he had won the Strega Prize for La bella estate (The Beautiful Summer), comprising three novellas: "La tenda", written in 1940, "Il diavolo sulle colline" (1948) and "Tra donne sole" (1949).

Leslie Fiedler wrote of Pavese's death "...for the Italians, his death has come to have a weight like that of Hart Crane for us, a meaning that penetrates back into his own work and functions as a symbol in the literature of an age." The circumstances of his suicide, which took place in a hotel room, mimic the last scene of Tra donne sole (Among Single Women), his penultimate book. His last book was La luna e i falò, published in Italy in 1950 and translated into English as The Moon and the Bonfires by Louise Sinclair in 1952.

He was an atheist.

== Themes in Pavese's works ==
The typical protagonist in the works of Pavese is a loner, through choice or circumstances. Their relationships with men and women tend to be temporary and superficial. They may wish to have more solidarity with other people, but they often end up betraying their ideals and friends; for example, in The Prison, the political exile in a village in Southern Italy receives a note from another political confinato living nearby, who suggests a meeting. The protagonist rejects a show of solidarity and refuses to meet him. This short novel appeared in a collection entitled Before the Cock Crows referencing Peter's betrayal of Christ before his death.

The Langhe, the area where he spent his summer holidays as a boy, had a great hold on Pavese. It is a land of rolling hills covered in vineyards. It is an area where he felt at home, but he recognised the harsh and brutal lives that poor peasants had, making a living from the land. Bitter struggles took place between Germans and partisans in this area. The land became part of Pavese's personal mythology.

In The Moon and the Bonfires, the protagonist tells a story of drinking beer in a bar in America. A man comes in whom he recognizes as being from the valleys of Le Langhe by his way of walking and his outlook. He speaks to him in dialect, suggesting a bottle of their local wine would be better than the beer. After some years in America, the protagonist returns to his home village. He explores Le Langhe with a friend who had remained in the area. He finds out that so many of his contemporaries have died in sad circumstances, some as partisans shot by the Germans, while a notable local beauty had been executed by partisans as a fascist spy.

== Books ==
- Lavorare stanca (Hard Labor) – poems, 1936; expanded edition 1943.

See also: McGlazer, Ramsey (May 2017). "The Decay of Sighing: Cesare Pavese's Lavorare stanca". differences: A Journal of Feminist Cultural Studies. 28 (1). Duke University Press: 94–123. doi:10.1215/10407391-3821712.

- Paesi tuoi (Your Villages) – novel, 1941.
- La spiaggia (The Beach) – novel, 1941.
- Feria d'agosto (August Holiday), 1946.
- Il compagno (The Comrade) – novel, 1947.
- Dialoghi con Leucò (The Leucothea Dialogues) – philosophical dialogues between classical Greek characters, 1947.
- Il diavolo sulle colline (The Devil in the Hills) – novel, 1948.
- Prima che il gallo canti (Before the Cock Crows) – two novels: La casa in collina (The House on the Hill) and Il carcere (The Prison), 1948.
- La bella estate (The Beautiful Summer) – three novellas including "Tra donne sole" ("Women on Their Own"), 1949.
- La luna e i falò (The Moon and the Bonfires) – novel, 1950.
- Verrà la morte e avrà i tuoi occhi (Death Will Come and Have your Eyes) – poems, 1951.
- Il mestiere di vivere: Diario 1935–1950 (The Business of Living: Diaries 1935–1950; published in English as The Burning Brand), 1952.
- Saggi letterari – literary essays.
- Racconti – two volumes of short stories.
- Lettere 1926–1950 – two volumes of letters.
- Disaffections: Complete Poems 1930–1950. Translated by Geoffrey Brock, Copper Canyon Press, 2002.
