= 2015 in Italian television =

This is a list of Italian television related events from 2015.

== Events ==
- 14 May – 27-year-old manipulator dynamic Simone Al Ani wins the sixth season of Italia's Got Talent.
- 27 May – Fabio Curto wins the third season of The Voice of Italy.
- 10 December – Federica Lepanto wins the fourteenth season of Grande Fratello. Giosada wins the ninth season of X Factor on the same evening.

== Debuts ==
=== Serials ===
- Il paradiso delle signore ("The ladies' heaven") – soap opera (at first weekly, later daily) with Alessandro Tersigni and Alice Torrani, vaguely inspired by Émile Zola's Au Bonheur des Dames, whose plot is transposed in the Milan of the Italian economic miracle; 5 seasons (until now).

=== Serials ===
- Alex & Co. (Disney Channel) – sitcom about a music band of high school students, directed by Claudio Norza, with Leonardo Cecchi; 3 seasons, 4 special episodes, a film version (How to Grow Up Despite Your Parents) and a spin-off (Penny on M.A.R.S.). First Italian fiction produced by Disney Channel, it gets a good public success and is widely exported in Europe and South America.

== Television shows ==
=== Drama ===
- Max e Helene – by Giacomo Battiato, with Alessandro Averone and Carolina Crescentini, from the Simon Wiesenthal's novel, inspired by the true love story, at the time of the Holocaust, between a young Jew and the daughter of an anti-Semite.

==== Miniseries ====
- La dama velata ("The veiled lady") – gothic drama, by Carmine Elia, with Miriam Leone, Lino Guanciale and Lucrezia Lante Della Rovere, coproduced with Spain; 12 episodes. In the late nineteenth century, a woman fakes her own death to investigate about her family's mysteries.

==== Variety ====
- Il decalogo di Vasco ("Vasco Rossi's Decalogue") – music documentary by Fabio Masi.

==== News and educational ====
- Missione spazio ("Mission space") – by Marco Lorenzo Maiello; documentary about the space flights, with precious witnesses by the Italian astronauts.
- Tiziano Terzani una vita oltre le righe ("Tiziano Terzani, an over the top life") – documentary-interview by Maurizio Bernardi.

=== 2000s ===
- Grande Fratello (2000–present)
- Ballando con le stelle (2005–present)
- X Factor (2008–present)

=== 2010s ===
- Italia's Got Talent (2010–present)
- The Voice of Italy (2013–present)

== Networks and services ==
=== Launches ===
Network	Type	Launch date	Notes	Source
Gazzetta TV	Cable and satellite	26 February		

=== Closures ===
Network	Type	Closure date	Notes	Source
Fox Sports 2	Cable and satellite	29 June		
MTV Classic	Cable and satellite	31 July		
Onda Latina	Cable and satellite	28 December		

== See also ==
- 2015 in Italy
- List of Italian films of 2015
