= List of Alex & Co. episodes =

Alex & Co. is an Italian television sitcom which first aired on Disney Channel Italy on 11 May 2015. The series was created by Marina Efron Versiglia, and stars Leonardo Cecchi, Eleonora Gaggero, Beatrice Vendramin, Saul Nanni, and Federico Russo.

== Series overview ==
Series	Episodes		Originally released	
Series	Episodes		First released	Last released
1	13		11 May 2015	27 May 2015
2	18		27 September 2015	29 November 2015
3	20	10	24 September 2016	22 October 2016
3	20	10	21 January 2017	18 February 2017
Specials	4		26 June 2017	29 June 2017

== Episode list ==
- All episodes were directed by Claudio Norza unless otherwise noted.

=== Season 1 (2015) (Music Speaks) ===
No. overall	No. in season	Title	Written by	Original release date	UK air date
1	1	Episode 1	Marina Efron Versiglia, Maria Carmen López-Areal Garcia, Constanza Novick	11 May 2015	24 July 2017
Best friends Alex, Nicole and Christian are freshmen at the Melsher Institute, where there are strict rules. The 3 befriend Sam when they defend him from sophomores Tom and Barto, and they meet Emma when Alex takes an interest in her. Nicole, who had developed feelings for Alex over the summer, becomes jealous of his infatuation with Emma. Linda, Tom's girlfriend, sends the group to the abandoned part of the school where they find a forbidden zone before being caught and taken to their class. Their tardiness leads Professor Strozzi to give them detention where they bond, and after school the group return to explore the forbidden zone.
2	2	Episode 2	Maria Carmen López-Areal Garcia, Constanza Novick	12 May 2015	25 July 2017
In the forbidden zone, the group finds a secret room which they plan to return to after school. Before reaching the secret room, they are caught by Nina, the janitor, who lets them go, but Tom, Linda and Barto are suspicious. The fun, unconventional teaching methods of the group's literature teacher Professor Belli is disapproved of by Strozzi and principal Mr. Ferrari, and to make matters worse Strozzi suggests Belli could cause the school's ranking to lower, putting Ferrari's job at stake. The group returns to the secret room. Emma shows interest in Alex, which disappoints Nicole. Nicole is suspicious of Emma, and Emma is revealed to be Ferrari's daughter.
3	3	Episode 3	Marina Efron Versiglia, Maria Carmen López-Areal Garcia, Constanza Novick	13 May 2015	26 July 2017
Alex doesn't believe Nicole when she tells him about her suspicions about Emma, hurting her feelings. Alex takes Emma to the secret room, where she sings part of a song she's been writing. Christian becomes captain of the soccer team, infuriating Tom. The group find Belli in the secret room, and they all promise to keep each other's secret. Belli teaches Alex to sing. The 5 friends decide to form a band. Nicole questions Emma and learns that Ferrari is her father, Linda eavesdrops.
4	4	Episode 4	Marina Efron Versiglia, Maria Carmen López-Areal Garcia, Constanza Novick	14 May 2015	27 July 2017
The group name their band Sound Aloud, and they work on their first song, Music Speaks, in the secret room with Belli guiding them. Sam comforts Nicole about Alex and Emma. Sam has a crush on Nicole, but she remains oblivious. Belli and Strozzi argue over how to raise the students' test scores in order to raise the school's ranking. It's revealed Belli attended Melsher when it was an art school, and he hopes someday it will be that way again. Linda, jealous of Emma's close relationship with Christian, blackmails Emma, threatening to release a picture exposing Emma as Ferrari's daughter if Emma doesn't retrieve Linda's phone from the principal's office. When Emma refuses, Linda sends the photo to the whole school.
5	5	Episode 5	Benjamin Herranz Caballero	15 May 2015	28 July 2017
Alex stands Emma up for their date, angry about her secret. Sam is arriving late, sleeping during class and mysteriously disappearing after school. The group forgives Emma, but Alex remains upset that Nicole knew Emma's secret and didn't tell him. They decide to film a music video of other people dancing to their song, that way Ferrari, who doesn't approve of music, won't know Emma is singing. The group discovers that Sam works as a gardener to pay for school, so they show up and help. Alex finally forgives Nicole.
6	6	Episode 6	Maria Carmen López-Areal Garcia	18 May 2015	31 July 2017
Emma makes a mysterious phone call. Tom causes Christian to hurt his knee, putting him out of commission. At the park, the group films dancers for their music video, playing themselves singing Music Speaks in the background without showing their faces. They post the video and it's an instant success, though Linda figures out it's them singing. As Alex approaches Emma for their rescheduled date, he meets her boyfriend.
7	7	Episode 7	Angela Obon Tolosa	19 May 2015	1 August 2017
Nicole tries to comfort a rejected Alex. Linda and Nicole compete in an election for student council president. Linda exposes the band, Sound Aloud, to the headmaster, who scolds Emma for bothering with something so trivial.
8	8	Episode 8	Benjamin Herranz Caballero	20 May 2015	2 August 2017
9	9	Episode 9	Maria Carmen López-Areal Garcia	21 May 2015	3 August 2017
10	10	Episode 10	Maria Carmen López-Areal Garcia	22 May 2015	7 August 2017
11	11	Episode 11	Angela Obon Tolosa	25 May 2015	8 August 2017
12	12	Episode 12	Maria Carmen López-Areal Garcia	26 May 2015	9 August 2017
13	13	Episode 13	Marina Efron Versiglia, Angela Obon Tolosa	27 May 2015	10 August 2017

=== Season 2 (2015) Unbelievable ===
No. overall	No. in season	Title	Written by	Original release date	UK air date
14	1	Episode 14	Maria Carmen Lopez-Areal Garcia, Benjamin Herranz	27 September 2015	2 January 2018
15	2	Episode 15	Eleonora Babbo, Giacomo Berdini, Vincenzo Galli, Maria Carmen Lopez-Areal Garcia, Beatrice Valsecchi	4 October 2015	3 January 2018
16	3	Episode 16	Angela Obon Tolosa	4 October 2015	4 January 2018
17	4	Episode 17	Maite Perez Astorga	11 October 2015	8 January 2018
18	5	Episode 18	Angela Obon Tolosa	11 October 2015	9 January 2018
19	6	Episode 19	Eleonora Babbo, Giacomo Berdini, Vincenzo Galli, Benjamin Herranz, Maria Carmen Lopez-Areal Garcia, Beatrice Valsecchi	18 October 2015	10 January 2018
20	7	Episode 20	Benjamin Herranz	18 October 2015	11 January 2018
21	8	Episode 21	Benjamin Herranz	25 October 2015	15 January 2018
22	9	Episode 22	Angela Obon Tolosa	25 October 2015	16 January 2018
23	10	Episode 23	Eleonora Babbo, Giacomo Berdini, Vincenzo Galli, Angela Obon Tolosa, Beatrice Valsecchi	1 November 2015	17 January 2018
24	11	Episode 24	Angela Obon Tolosa	1 November 2015	18 January 2018
25	12	Episode 25	Maite Perez Astorga	8 November 2015	22 January 2018
Alex has finally found out that Nicole "cheated" on him with the assistant chef. He is frustrated with this fact. E sees them together after David is told to leave the site.
26	13	Episode 26	Benjamin Herranz, Maria Carmen Lopez-Areal Garcia, Maite Perez Astorga	8 November 2015	23 January 2018
27	14	Episode 27	Angela Obon Tolosa	15 November 2015	24 January 2018
28	15	Episode 28	Benjamin Herranz, Angela Obon Tolosa	15 November 2015	25 January 2018
29	16	Episode 29	Eleonora Babbo, Giacomo Berdini, Vincenzo Galli, Angela Obon Tolosa, Beatrice Valsecchi	22 November 2015	29 January 2018
30	17	Episode 30	Eleonora Babbo, Giacomo Berdini, Vincenzo Galli, Benjamin Herranz, Maite Perez Astorga, Beatrice Valsecchi	22 November 2015	30 January 2018
31	18	Episode 31	Eleonora Babbo, Giacomo Berdini, Vincenzo Galli, Angela Obon Tolosa, Beatrice Valsecchi	29 November 2015	31 January 2018

=== Season 3 (2016–2017) ===
No. overall	No. in season	Title	Written by	Original release date	UK air date
Part 1
32	1	Episode 32	Eleonora Babbo, Vincenzo Galli	24 September 2016	12 March 2018
33	2	Episode 33	Eleonora Babbo, Vincenzo Galli	24 September 2016	13 March 2018
34	3	Episode 34	Giacomo Berdini	1 October 2016	14 March 2018
35	4	Episode 35	Beatrice Valsecchi	1 October 2016	15 March 2018
36	5	Episode 36	Eleonora Babbo, Vincenzo Galli	8 October 2016	19 March 2018
37	6	Episode 37	Eleonora Babbo, Vincenzo Galli	8 October 2016	20 March 2018
38	7	Episode 38	Angelo Pastore, Beatrice Valsecchi	15 October 2016	21 March 2018
39	8	Episode 39	Angelo Pastore, Beatrice Valsecchi	15 October 2016	22 March 2018
40	9	Episode 40	Alessandro Pavanelli, Beatrice Valsecchi	22 October 2016	26 March 2018
41	10	Episode 41	Angelo Pastore, Beatrice Valsecchi	22 October 2016	27 March 2018
Part 2
42	11	Episode 42	Eleonora Babbo, Giacomo Berdini, Vincenzo Galli, Alessandro Pavanelli	21 January 2017	28 March 2018
43	12	Episode 43	Angelo Pastore	21 January 2017	29 March 2018
44	13	Episode 44	Eleonora Babbo, Giacomo Berdini, Vincenzo Galli, Alessandro Pavanelli	28 January 2017	2 April 2018
45	14	Episode 45	Eleonora Babbo, Giacomo Berdini, Vincenzo Galli, Beatrice Valsecchi	28 January 2017	3 April 2018
46	15	Episode 46	Giacomo Berdini, Alessandro Pavanelli, Beatrice Valsecchi	4 February 2017	4 April 2018
47	16	Episode 47	Giacomo Berdini, Alessandro Pavanelli, Beatrice Valsecchi	4 February 2017	5 April 2018
48	17	Episode 48	Angelo Pastore	11 February 2017	9 April 2018
49	18	Episode 49	Angelo Pastore	11 February 2017	10 April 2018
50	19	Episode 50	Giacomo Berdini, Alessandro Pavanelli	18 February 2017	11 April 2018
51	20	Episode 51	Giacomo Berdini	18 February 2017	12 April 2018

=== Specials ===
- Four special episodes aired in June 2017, marking the end of the series. These episodes are not going to be airing in the UK.

No. overall	No. in season	Title	Written by	Original release date
52	1	Special Episode 1	Giacomo Berdini, Angelo Pastore	26 June 2017
53	2	Special Episode 2	Giacomo Berdini, Angelo Pastore	27 June 2017
54	3	Special Episode 3	Giacomo Berdini, Angelo Pastore	28 June 2017
55	4	Special Episode 4	Giacomo Berdini, Angelo Pastore	29 June 2017
