= List of programs broadcast by Disney Channel (Scandinavia) =

This is a list of programs broadcast by Disney Channel (Scandinavia). It does not include Disney XD, Disney Junior, Toon Disney, Playhouse Disney, Fox Kids or Jetix programs. Almost every program on the channel is dubbed into Danish, Swedish and Norwegian, with some programs also available in Finnish or Russian as well.

== Current programming (new episodes or reruns) ==
=== Animated ===
- Phineas and Ferb
- DuckTales
- Big City Greens
- Amphibia
- The Owl House'
- The Ghost and Molly McGee
- Spider-Man
- Rapunzel's Tangled Adventure

=== Disney Junior programming ===
- Art Attack (Scandinavian version moving to Disney XD)

=== Live-action ===
- Bunk'd
- Stuck in the Middle
- Raven's Home
- Gabby Duran & the Unsittables
- Jessie
- Sydney to the Max
- K.C. Undercover
- Just Roll with It
- Coop & Cami Ask the World
- Secrets of Sulphur Springs
- Dog with a Blog
- Disney Fam Jam (English language only)
- Austin & Ally
- Good Luck Charlie
- Violetta

=== EU/UK shows ===
- Rolling with the Ronks!
- Miraculous: Tales of Ladybug and Cat Noir
- Dude, That's My Ghost!
- 101 Dalmatian Street
- Space Chickens in Space
- Ghostforce
- Best Bugs Forever
- The Evermoor Chronicles
- Kid vs. Kat
- Binny and the Ghost
- The Lodge
- Alex & Co.
- Penny on M.A.R.S.

== Former programming ==
- 101 Dalmatians: The Series
- A.N.T. Farm
- Adventures of the Gummi Bears
- A Kind of Magic
- Aladdin
- American Dragon: Jake Long
- Andi Mack (English language only)
- Atomic Puppet
- Bear in the Big Blue House
- Bizaardvark
- The Book of Pooh
- Boy Meets World (English language only)
- Buzz Lightyear of Star Command
- The Buzz on Maggie
- Chuggington
- Cory in the House (English language only)
- Dave the Barbarian
- Darkwing Duck
- Descendants: Wicked World
- Doug (Disney seasons only)
- DuckTales (1987 TV series)
- Elena of Avalor
- The Fairly OddParents (Nelvana seasons only)
- Famous 5: On the Case
- Fillmore!
- Fish Hooks
- Gamer's Guide to Pretty Much Everything
- Girl Meets World
- Goldie and Bear
- Good Luck Charlie
- Goof Troop
- H_{2}O: Just Add Water
- Handy Manny
- Hannah Montana
- Higglytown Heroes
- House of Mouse
- I Didn't Do It
- Imagination Movers
- Jake & Blake
- Jake and the Never Land Pirates
- JoJo's Circus
- Jonas L.A.
- Jungle Cubs
- Kim Possible
- LazyTown
- Lilo & Stitch: The Series
- The Lion Guard
- Little Einsteins
- Mickey Mouse Clubhouse
- Mickey and the Roadster Racers
- Minnie's Bow-Toons
- The New Adventures of Winnie the Pooh
- Pepper Ann
- Phil of the Future (English language only)
- PrankStars
- Puppy Dog Pals
- Quack Pack
- Recess
- The Replacements
- Right Now Kapow
- Rolie Polie Olie
- Scaredy Squirrel
- Shanna's Show
- Smart Guy (English language only)
- Stanley
- Sweet Valley High
- Shake It Up
- Sonny with a Chance
- Soy Luna
- Star Wars Rebels
- Stitch!
- The Suite Life of Zack & Cody
- The Suite Life on Deck
- Take Two with Phineas and Ferb
- TaleSpin
- That's So Raven (English language only)
- Timon and Pumbaa
- Totally Spies!
- Troll Tales
- Vampirina
- Wander Over Yonder
- Wizards of Waverly Place
