= Federico Russo =

Federico Russo may refer to:

- Federico Russo (presenter) (born 1980), Italian radio and television presenter
- Federico Russo (actor) (born 1997), Italian film and television actor
