= List of Penny on M.A.R.S. episodes =

Penny on M.A.R.S. is an English-language teen dramedy series of the Walt Disney Company that is produced in Italy. The series is a spin-off of the Italian series Alex & Co.

== Series overview ==
Series	Episodes	Originally released		UK First aired	UK Last aired
Series	Episodes	First released	Last released	UK First aired	UK Last aired
1	16	7 May 2018	25 May 2018	4 June 2018	28 June 2018
2	10	8 April 2019	19 April 2019	18 February 2019	5 March 2019
3	13	3 July 2020	3 July 2020	17 February 2020	9 March 2020

== Episodes ==
- All episodes were directed by Claudio Norza unless otherwise noted.

=== Season 1 (2018) ===
No. overall	No. in season	Title	Original release date	UK air date
1	1	"Penny's New Life"	7 May 2018	4 June 2018
2	2	"Penny's New Life"	7 May 2018	5 June 2018
Penny comes back after being sent to a boarding school in Switzerland and meets with her guardian, Debbie and best friend Camilla. Penny and Camilla decide to sneak out and attend auditions at a prestigious school called M.A.R.S. Camilla tells Penny about how she's swooning over a boy named Sebastian who saved her from drowning in a lake in summer school. While on their way to M.A.R.S, Penny loses Camilla but comes across a boy performing on the street with whom she is immediately smitten, his father gets arrested and he asks Penny to meet with him she gives him her keychain as surety and hence names him "The charm thief". At the auditions Penny and Camilla meet a girl named Sofia who is auditioning for dance. The audition goes well for Camilla but Penny freezes and has a stage fright during her audition, Camilla then throws a hairbrush at her and tells her to imagine it's just the both of them in their room playing pretend which helps Penny regain her confidence and she sings brilliantly impressing almost everyone. Just then Bakìa's bodyguards track Penny's phone and bring both the girls home.
3	3	"Sebastian at M.A.R.S."	8 May 2018	6 June 2018
Bakìa is furious at Penny for sneaking out and almost exposing her secret. Penny finds a picture of Bakía and a man and is convinced that it's her father. Both Camilla and Penny get accepted into M.A.R.S and convince Bakìa into letting them go but on a condition that no one must ever find out that Penny is her daughter and if anyone comes close to knowing she will be sent back to boarding school she agrees. At M.A.R.S Camilla finds out that Sebastian is also at the school and Penny realizes that her "Charm thief" and Sebastian are the same person.
4	4	"Friend in Need"	9 May 2018	7 June 2018
Sebastian asks Penny to promise that she won't tell anyone about his dad getting arrested. At an acting class Sean gives the students an exercise to speak about their true feelings and Penny speaks about her father. Penny shows Sean the picture of her father and asks him if he knows what instrument the man is playing in the picture and Ms Bauer tells her it's a Pentachord and Penny figures out that she was named after that instrument. Camilla goes to Sebastians uncles bowling alley in the hopes of hanging out with him but social workers who are concerned about Sebastian's welfare arrive and discover that he is living in the bowling alley.
5	5	"Parent's Open Day"	10 May 2018	11 June 2018
Penny and Sebastian lie to the social worker that he is registered and lives at the school dorm, He moves into Nick and Mike's room. Camilla seems to falling more and more for Sebastian. Penny continues searching for her father. It's the open day for all the parents of the students at M.A.R.S and Penny is disappointed that Bakìa cannot come. Penny is afraid she'll get stage fright at the concert performance the students are doing for the parents but Sean gives her advice which helps her finally cure her stage fright but this angers Lucy who's bent on revenge.
6	6	"The Payback"	11 May 2018	12 June 2018
Lucy tricks Penny and then posts a video she made of Penny mocking Tosca's song and it goes viral. Engaged at Penny's actions Tosca decides to assign, Nobody's perfect, a difficult Bakìa song to Penny. Looking for her mother's help, she comes back home only to discover Bakìa's just left.
7	7	"Nobody's Perfect Indeed"	14 May 2018	13 June 2018
Penny asks her mother for help again but Bakia is too busy. Penny and Camilla fight. During an exercise, Sebastian kisses Penny.
8	8	"Just Acting"	15 May 2018	14 June 2018
Camilla asks for explanation about Penny's kiss with Sebastian, but Penny assures her it was just an exercise. It seems that Penny and Bruce are finally going to meet.
9	9	"Your Father is Here"	16 May 2018	18 June 2018
Freddy Wolf stops Penny just before she can meet Bruce. Penny fails Tosca's exam, while a journalist reveals that Bakia has a secret daughter called Penny.
10	10	"The Audition"	17 May 2018	19 June 2018
11	11	"Feelings For You"	18 May 2018	20 June 2018
12	12	"Enemy Countries"	21 May 2018	21 June 2018
13	13	"The Gig"	22 May 2018	25 June 2018
Worried that Sebastian may have to leave M.A.R.S Penny asks Bakìa to fund a scholarship. Nick goes on a date with Sofia and she catches him being coached by Mike which upsets her. Lucy figures out that Penny is Bakìa's secret daughter. Penny breaks the rules and decides to perform live at Twin Pins in order to apologize to Sebastian but Lucy eavesdrops and brings Tosca there who catches her.
14	14	"The Protest"	23 May 2018	26 June 2018
15	15	"The Charm"	24 May 2018	27 June 2018
Penny challenges Tosca that if she's able to sing Nobody's Perfect perfectly she will be rewarded with an A. Sebastian tells Camilla that he is Penny's charm thief. Penny and Sebastian reconcile and Mitch teaches Penny how to sing Nobody's Perfect. Penny wins the challenge against Tosca.
16	16	"The Big One"	25 May 2018	28 June 2018

=== Season 2 (2019) ===
No. overall	No. in season	Title	Original release date	UK air date
17	1	"A New Friend"	8 April 2019	18 February 2019
18	2	"Tom's Real Identity"	9 April 2019	19 February 2019
The teams for the 2-good are out and Penny finds out that she has to work with Sasha.
19	3	"Mom, Meet Dad"	10 April 2019	20 February 2019
After Penny finds out that Freddie was the one to separate Bakia and Bruce by creating a misunderstanding among them, she plans a dinner and invites both of her parents. There they sort out their problems.
20	4	"The Unexpected Kiss"	11 April 2019	21 February 2019
21	5	"The Proof"	12 April 2019	25 February 2019
22	6	"The Mural"	15 April 2019	26 February 2019
Mitch hosts a press conference and Bakìa tells the media that Freddy was indeed the one who stole the song Nobody's Perfect from Mitch 16 years ago. Tom lashes out his anger on Penny and Sofia after finding out his uncle was fired. Nick and Sofia begin to grow closer. Bakìa finally decides to pay the royalties to Nobody's Perfect to Mitch and Penny decides to plan a birthday party for Pete. Later somebody spray paints offensive words against Penny outside the M.A.R.S building.
23	7	"Birthday Party"	16 April 2019	27 February 2019
Tom is revealed to have been the one who spray painted the words about Penny. Penny lets the teachers pardon his act and she tells him that she feels sorry that he blindly trusts Freddy all the time, Camilla tries to avoid Tom. The team throws a birthday party for Pete but he falls ill during the party and is rushed back to hospital.
24	8	"Pete's Song"	17 April 2019	28 February 2019
25	9	"The Trap"	18 April 2019	4 March 2019
26	10	"The 2-Good"	19 April 2019	5 March 2019

=== Season 3 (2020) ===
No. overall	No. in season	Title	Original release date	UK air date
27	1	"The Other Side Of The World"	3 July 2020	17 February 2020
With Sebastian on tour in New Zealand Penny feels neglected. Bruce gets a phone call that Bakìa's plane crashed and they haven't found her yet. The teachers at M.A.R.S decide to stage preparations for the midyear play called the "M.A.R.S.ical" based on the ugly duckling story. Penny meets her and Camilla's long lost childhood friend Vicky at the Orphanage where Pete is staying and convince her to join M.A.R.S whilst a new student, Martha, with devious intentions joins M.A.R.S.
28	2	"The Ugly Duckling"	3 July 2020	18 February 2020
Sasha and Penny wait on the song Sebastian promised them. Tom and Camilla go on date. Freddie plots against Penny and tries to get Tosca to help him but she refuses and tells him to stay away from her and Penny. Penny continues to worry about Bakía's whereabouts whilst Vicky continues being bullied by other students for her appearance. Pete is disappointed that Bakía still hasn't come back. Bruce gets a phone call at the last minute saying Bakía has been found.
29	3	"Welcome Back, Mum"	3 July 2020	19 February 2020
30	4	"An Unwelcome Surprise"	3 July 2020	20 February 2020
31	5	"The Talent Show!"	3 July 2020	24 February 2020
32	6	"Just Friends?"	3 July 2020	25 February 2020
33	7	"Prima Ballerina"	3 July 2020	26 February 2020
34	8	"Unexpected guests"	3 July 2020	27 February 2020
35	9	"Rumours"	3 July 2020	2 March 2020
36	10	"Let's Get Pete!"	3 July 2020	3 March 2020
37	11	"Who Will Make It To The Finals?"	3 July 2020	4 March 2020
38	12	"The M.A.R.S.ical"	3 July 2020	5 March 2020
39	13	"The Finals"	3 July 2020	9 March 2020
