= Love & Gelato =

2022 romantic comedy film

- Directed by: Brandon Camp
- Written by: Brandon Camp
- Based on: Love & Gelato (novel)
- Produced by: Viola Prestieri David Bertoni
- Starring: Susanna Skaggs Tobia De Angelis Owen McDonnell
- Production company: GT Film
- Distributed by: Netflix
- Release date: June 22, 2022 (worldwide)
- Language: English Italian

Love & Gelato is a 2022 romantic comedy film directed and written by Brandon Camp. It follows 17-year-old Lina Emerson (Susanna Skaggs) as she travels to Rome in the summer before starting college shortly after her mother's funeral to fulfill her final wish. While in Italy, she is set on a journey to discover romance, adventure, and gelato. The film is based on the bestselling 2016 young adult novel by Jenna Evans Welch.

== Plot ==
After her mother's death, 17-year-old American Lina Emerson spends the summer in Rome before starting college at MIT. Although her extroverted best friend Addie wanted to join her, she has to go alone to honor her mother Hadley's last wish. Lina is uninterested not only in face-to-face interaction but also in social media engagement.

When she arrives in Italy, Lina is to stay with her mother's friend, Francesca. She meets another old friend of her mother’s, Howard, and his student, Lorenzo.

While wandering around the city, Lina meets Alessandro "Ale" who will also be a student in Boston in the upcoming fall.

Francesca later gives Lina her mother's diary from when she visited Italy at the same age and left to get settled in. The diary tells of Hadley’s budding relationship with “X.”

As Lina is trying to sleep, Ale calls and invites her to an opera fundraiser that night that his parents are hosting. Francesca gives Lina a makeover, and dresses and coaches her how to walk in heels. At the opera, Lina admits to Ale she has little life experience, which doesn't dissuade him. He gets her to chase him through off-limit areas of the building, until security catches them.

Ale's banker father insists he meet important contacts, so Lina leaves. Flustered, she bumps into Lorenzo, who is working with the event's catering, getting gelato on her. Recognising her from the graduation party, he offers her clean clothes and a lift.

On the way, Lorenzo takes Lina to get pastries from a secret bakery. As he's leaving her at Francesca's, Ale shows up and invites her to go swimming the next day at noon.

In the morning, Howard shows Lina a few of Hadley's photos, some of which she recognizes, and gives her her mother’s old camera. She spends a few hours snapping photos until she's due at Ale's. They take one of his dad's many cars out to a stream with a waterfall and he convinces her to jump into the pool below. Exhilarated, after he pledges exclusivity, Lina has her first make out session.

Elated, Lina tells Addie about it. Spying on Ale's social media account, however, Lina realises there is no mention of her and sees a recent photo of Ale with someone else and not with his dad as he'd told her. Lina then confronts Ale.

The next day, Lina goes to the countryside with Francesca and Howard for a meal at his colleagues', Lorenzo's moms. She catches Lorenzo doing a practice run for his examination to enter a culinary school. Lina is helping to make the gelato when his possessive girlfriend interrupts by making out with him.

At the meal, Lina confronts Howard, believing he is her father. Despite her misinterpretation of the diary, he still offers to step up as her father because he was in love with Lina's mother. She later discovers that her mother's photography teacher, Matteo Fossi, is her biological father.

Finding Fossi's studio in Florence, Lina grabs the train and runs into Lorenzo. They encourage each other, agreeing to return to Rome together. At the studio, she introduces herself as Fossi's daughter, but is told he's out. Lina barges into his office only for him to ignore her. She leaves, taking a large photo of her mother from Fossi's gallery display.

Lina and Lorenzo commiserate their unsuccessful missions and kiss, although she tells him it was a mistake once back in Rome, due to the timing. As she announces she's returning to the US early, Francesca calls Addie, their emergency plan. Arriving quickly, she insists they stay to have fun. Addie gets them an invite to Ale's graduation party. There, Lina realises Ale will always follow his family's wishes and discovers Lorenzo is heading to Paris.

Addie and Lina hurry to the station, where she wishes him luck and says the kiss wasn't a mistake. Meeting with Howard, she gives him her mother's love lock she found. As she's deferring college for a year he asks if he can act as her adoptive dad.

One year later, Lina finds Lorenzo in Rome in front of the secret bakery. He reveals he'll be taking over, as the woman who ran it retired. Lorenzo invites Lina to his grandmother's in the countryside, where they go on her Vespa.

== Cast ==
- Susanna Skaggs as Lina Emerson
- Valentina Lodovini as Francesca
- Owen McDonnell as Howard
- Saul Nanni as Alessandro Albani
- Tobia de Angelis as Lorenzo Ferazza
- Anjelika Washington as Addie
- Marie-France Carilla as Vicki
- Alex Boniello as Fleetwood Zach

== Production ==
Love & Gelato was written and directed by Brandon Camp. It was filmed in Italy and produced by Viola Prestieri, David Bertoni, and GT Film. The film is based on the 2016 young adult novel Love & Gelato by Jenna Evans Welch.

== Release ==
The film was announced on May 25, 2022 and released for streaming globally on Netflix on June 22 of the same year.

== Reception ==
The film received mostly negative reviews from critics, holding a score of 22% on Rotten Tomatoes. In particular, reviews criticized its reliance on cliches and the shallowness of its writing. The film also received criticism online from readers of the novel on which it is based.
