= Tini: The Movie =

- Official English poster
- Tini: El gran cambio de Violetta
- Directed by: Juan Pablo Buscarini
- Written by: Ramón Salazar
- Produced by: Pablo Bossi
- Starring: Martina Stoessel; Jorge Blanco; Mercedes Lambre; Clara Alonso; Adrián Salzedo; Diego Ramos; Sofia Carson; Ángela Molina
- Cinematography: Josu Inchaustegui
- Edited by: Pablo Mari
- Music by: Federico Jusid
- Production companies: The Walt Disney Company Latin America; Gloriamundi Producciones; Lapis Film
- Distributed by: Walt Disney Studios Motion Pictures International (Note: Released via the Walt Disney Pictures label)
- Release dates: 23 April 2016 (Amsterdam); 6 May 2016 (Spain); 12 May 2016 (Italy); 2 June 2016 (Argentina)
- Running time: 98 minutes
- Countries: Argentina; Spain; Italy
- Language: Spanish
- Box office: $17 million

Tini: The Movie (also known as Tini: The Movie – The New Life of Violetta and Tini: The New Life of Violetta; Spanish: Tini: El gran cambio de Violetta, "Tini: The great change of Violetta") is an Argentine-Spanish–Italian drama film created by Ramón Salazar, is a film set in an alternative universe from that of the television series Violetta. Martina Stoessel, Jorge Blanco, Mercedes Lambre, Clara Alonso and Diego Ramos reprise their roles from the series. The film also stars Adrián Salzedo, Sofia Carson and Ángela Molina. It premiered on 6 May 2016 in Spain and 12 May 2016 in Italy. In Argentina, it premiered on 2 June 2016. In the United States, it was released digitally on 6 December 2016.

== Plot ==
Taking place sometime after the events of the third season, Violetta (Martina Stoessel) is coming back from a tour in Europe, misses León (Jorge Blanco) who is working in Los Angeles, and works with her pressuring manager, Willy, who has not allowed her to rest.

Upon arrival in Buenos Aires, Violetta discovers there are rumors about the end of her relationship with León and that another star named Melanie Sanchez (Sofia Carson) claims "León is more than a friend". Violetta questions Willy about it and he tells her that the others were lying about it because they were "looking out for her". Violetta then tries to call León, but Melanie picks up and tells Violetta that León is taking a shower, but in reality, he is trying to work on the music video for his new song, "Light Your Heart".

Later that same day, Violetta goes on a primetime talk-show where they talk to her about the drama surrounding the rumors about León and Melanie's relationship, followed by a report on it, much to Violetta's confusion, and is noted to her father, Germán (Diego Ramos), who is completely unsatisfied. The show then tries to talk to Violetta about her new album and tour, however pressured and heartbroken by the whole ordeal, she makes the decision and announces on the show that she is going to retire, to everyone's surprise, and Willy's frustration. The news of Violetta's abrupt retirement is spread all over the news, and the word quickly spreads to Ludmila (Mercedes Lambre), Violetta and León's friend, who becomes suspicious about it.

Violetta feels awful about the whole situation, while Germán gets an old letter from his friend, Isabella (Ángela Molina), and later gives it to her telling about Isabella's house for young artists, located in Italy. Violetta makes the option to go there. Germán and Angie (Clara Alonso) then send her off to Italy. Upon arrival in Italy, Violetta makes friends: Caio (Adrián Salzedo), a sailor and local villager, Eloísa (Georgina Amorós), a photographer, Roko (Francisco Viciana), a music artist, Miranda (Beatrice Arnera), a fashion designer, Raúl (Ridder van Kooten) and Saúl (Leonardo Cecchi), first cousins who are into stage design and direction, and of course, Isabella.

Upon meeting Isabella, she accidentally calls Violetta "Tini", which confuses her. Meanwhile, Ludmila tries to inform León of the situation multiple times, while he tries to work on his new song and misses Violetta, while he is also annoyed with Melanie.

Back in Italy, Violetta is enjoying herself, forms a friendship with Caio by spending time with him and signs him up for an audition to a national ballet academy as dancing is his passion. She also decides to perform in a music festival her mother participated in many years prior, and additionally, she commonly deals with the behavior of a fellow villager, Stefano (Lino Di Nuzzo). She then starts to write a new song on a piano that was pushed outside to the moon, but she remains curious on "Tini".

Ludmila finally gets to León and tells him about the whole ordeal, and he then realizes that the whole thing was a huge misunderstanding. After Ludmila gets Germán to tell her where Violetta is, she and León set out to Italy.

Later, after everyone else helps Violetta with her preparation for the festival, Isabella decides to reveal who "Tini" is, calls Germán and Angie to come down to Italy and shows Violetta home movies of her mother and a baby who she calls Tini. Germán comes in and tells Violetta that she is Tini, adding that it's what he and her mother wanted to name her, but they were unable to register her as Tini, so they named her Violetta.

Now calling herself Tini, she finishes her new song, and says goodbye to Caio as he heads off to audition. However, while all of this is happening, León and Ludmila have made their way to Italy. León attempts to find Violetta, but he sees her with Caio, and decides to depart, while Ludmila and Stefano meet and develop a relationship with each other. After Ludmila found her and told her that León came to reconcile and explain the misunderstanding, Tini attempts to find him on a boat, but León made a stop on a small island before departing. He then sees Tini getting into a boat accident and successfully rescues her, and they're finally reunited. Ludmila and Stefano manage to get Tini to the festival on time and she gets ready for her performance. Tini then gets on stage and performs her new song, "Born to Shine", while Caio passes the audition for the ballet academy. Tini then states in a narration that she will stay Tini forever.

== Cast ==
- Martina Stoessel as Tini
- Jorge Blanco as León
- Mercedes Lambre as Ludmila
- Diego Ramos as Germán
- Clara Alonso as Angie
- Sofía Carson as Melanie Sanchez
- Leonardo Cecchi as Saúl
- Georgina Amorós as Eloísa
- Beatrice Arnera as Miranda
- Ángela Molina as Isabella

== Accolades ==
Year	Award	Category	Result	Ref
2016	Starlight Cinema Awards	Social Trend Topic	Won	

== Music and soundtrack ==
On 29 April 2016, songs featured in the film were included in the release of Tini debut album.

Additionally, Leonardo Cecchi recorded a song for the movie, titled "Freeze Frame". He, along with Adrián Salzedo, Ridder van Kooten, and Beatrice Arnera, also perform a cover of "Reality" by Lost Frequencies.
