= Here Now (film) =

2024 Italian film by Gabriele Muccino

- Italian theatrical release poster
- Italian: Fino alla fine
- Directed by: Gabriele Muccino
- Written by: Paolo Costella; Gabriele Muccino
- Produced by: Andrea Leone; Raffaella Leone
- Starring: Elena Kampouris; Saul Nanni; Lorenzo Richelmy; Enrico Inserra; Francesco Garilli
- Cinematography: Fabio Zamarion
- Edited by: Claudio Di Mauro
- Music by: Paolo Buonvino
- Production companies: Lotus Production; Rai Cinema
- Distributed by: 01 Distribution; Voltage Pictures
- Release dates: October 18, 2024 (Rome); October 31, 2024 (Italy)
- Running time: 117 minutes
- Country: Italy
- Languages: Italian; English

Here Now (Italian: Fino alla fine, lit. 'Until the end') is a 2024 Italian romantic thriller film directed by Gabriele Muccino. It stars Elena Kampouris, Saul Nanni, Lorenzo Richelmy, Enrico Inserra, and Francesco Garilli. The film premiered at the 19th Rome Film Festival on 18 October 2024 and received a theatrical release in Italy on 31 October 2024.

== Premise ==
Sophie, a 20-year-old American on vacation in Sicily with her sister, meets Giulio and his friends on the last day of her trip. Together, the group experiences the craziest and most terrifying night of their lives.

== Cast ==
- Elena Kampouris as Sophie
- Saul Nanni as Giulio
- Lorenzo Richelmy as Komandante
- Enrico Inserra as Samba
- Francesco Garilli as Sprizz
- Yan Tual as Yuri
- Ruby Kammer as Rachel
- Syama Rayner as Liz
- Mitch Salm as Brian
- Grace Ambrose

== Production ==
The film, directed by Muccino and co-written with Paolo Costella, was produced by Lotus Production and Rai Cinema, with a budget of €11 million. It was shot mainly during daylight hours for seven weeks from September 2023. Filming took place in Palermo, with specific locations including Mondello, the Cassaro, the Foro Italico, and the Palermo Botanical Garden.

Muccino shot two different versions of the film, one in which the actors speak English, and one in which they speak Italian.

== Release ==
A teaser trailer for the film was released on 3 July 2024. The official trailer was released on 20 September 2024.

The film premiered at the 19th Rome Film Festival on 18 October 2024. It received a theatrical release in Italy on 31 October 2024.

== Reception ==
Vittoria Scarpa of Cineuropa wrote, "...Here Now definitely keeps you glued to your seat. The at once hyper vibrant and painful parable of this young woman is intriguing, as she continually pushes the limit of risk in order to get out of her emotional cage."
