= Unique Brothers =

- Directed by: Alessio Maria Federici
- Written by: Luca Miniero; Elena Bucaccio
- Produced by: Luca Bernabei
- Starring: Raoul Bova; Luca Argentero; Carolina Crescentini; Miriam Leone
- Cinematography: Paolo Carnera
- Music by: Umberto Scipione
- Distributed by: 01 Distribution
- Release date: 2 October 2014
- Language: Italian

Unique Brothers (Italian: Fratelli unici) is a 2014 Italian romantic comedy film written and directed by Alessio Maria Federici and starring Raoul Bova, Luca Argentero, Carolina Crescentini and Miriam Leone.

== Cast ==
- Raoul Bova as Pietro
- Luca Argentero as Francesco
- Carolina Crescentini as Giulia
- Miriam Leone as Sofia
- Sergio Assisi as Gustavo
- Eleonora Gaggero as Stella
- Michela Andreozzi as The Judge
- Augusto Zucchi as The Director

== See also ==
- List of Italian films of 2014
