= Olivia-Mai Barrett =

English actress, dancer, and singer

- Born: Crystal Palace, England
- Education: Italia Conti
- Occupation: Actress
- Years active: 2008–present

Olivia-Mai Barrett is an English actress from London, United Kingdom. She garnered recognition through her role in the Disney series Penny on M.A.R.S. in which she played the title role.

In 2019, she was in the last of eight episodes of the BBC mini-series, Soon Gone: A Windrush Chronicle, a series showing life in the UK for successive generations of people with Caribbean heritage, as Michaela Williams. In The Observer, Kwame Kwei-Armah was quoted as saying "Her performance was incredible, I was amazed at how she brought such empathy and insight to the part". Barrett shares the same background as her character in the series, as her father is mixed-race and her grandfather Jamaican; the Windrush story is part of her family background.

== Filmography ==
=== Television ===
Year	Title	Role	Note(s)
2008	Gigi	Little Girl	
2012	School For Stars	Herself	
2017	Alex & Co.	Penny Mendez	4 episodes
2018–2020	Penny on M.A.R.S.	Penny Mendez	Main role
2019	Soon Gone: A Windrush Chronicle	Michaela Williams	Episode: "Michaela"
2022	Rebel Cheer Squad	Meg "Mouse" Beeman	Recurring cast
2022	The Man Who Fell to Earth	Alicia	Episode: "Hallo Spaceboy"
2023	Invasion	Ryder Evans	7 Episodes
2025	Amadeus	Sophie Weber	5 Episodes

=== Films ===
Year	Title	Role
2020	My Dad's Christmas Date	Jules
2023	Kandahar	Ida Harris
2025	Savage Flowers	Rose
2027	Cliffhanger	Emily

=== Music Videos ===
Year	Title	Artist	Role
2015	Don't Give Up On Love	Blinkie	Girl
