= Federico Russo (actor) =

Italian actor (born 1997)

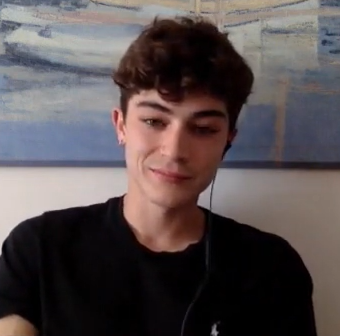
- Russo in 2020
- Born: 19 October 1997 (age 29); Rome, Italy
- Occupation: Actor
- Years active: 2004–present

Federico Russo (born 19 October 1997) is an Italian actor.

== Career ==
He debuted in 2004, appearing in the television series Incantesimo 7, broadcast in Italy by Rai 2. In 2005, he appeared in Incantesimo 8 and television miniseries, De Gasperi, l'uomo della speranza, broadcast by Rai Uno. In the same year, he won Dancing with the Children Starlets, category of the second edition of Dancing with the Stars, on Rai Uno conducted by Milly Carlucci.

In 2006, he appeared in the Canale 5 miniseries Carabinieri – Sotto copertura, spin-off of the television series Carabinieri.

From 2006–2014, Russo became well known for his role as Mimmo Cesaroni in Canale 5's I Cesaroni, with Claudio Amendola and Elena Sofia Ricci.

From 6 to 9 June 2009, he participated, as a guest, on Post Break, broadcast on Rai Gulp, along with Angelica Cinquantini; also from the cast of I Cesaroni. In the same year, he participated in the TV series The Teacher, in the role of Nino.

In 2010, he starred in the music video for the song Anime di Vetro, by PQuadro. In 2011, he starred in another music video, this time for Max Pezzali's Credi.

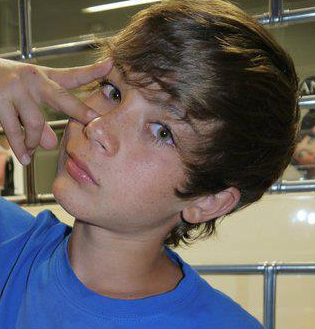
Russo in 2012

In 2015, he started playing Sam in the Italian Disney Channel sitcom Alex & Co..

In January 2016, the Alex & Co. album We Are One was released. The album has 10 songs, including 6 of which he sings in; in April, he performed at an Alex & Co. fan event. In the same year, as part of the Alex & Co. franchise, he starred in the film Alex & Co: How to Grow Up Despite Your Parents.

In 2017, he appeared in the Rai series Scomparsa, as Luca Rebeggiani, working with Vanessa Incontrada, Eleonora Gaggero, and Saul Nanni. He also participated in the series L'Isola di Pietro as Matteo Sulci, broadcast on Canale 5.

In 2018, he played Seba in the eleventh season of Don Matteo, broadcast on Rai 1.

In 2019, he starred in the film La Mia Seconda Volta (My Second Time).

In 2020, he played Mauro, the shy lead opposite Margherita Morchio's role as Daria in the Netflix series Curon.

In 2021, he starred in the title role of the film Ernesto, about a young man who explores his bisexuality and, to a lesser extent, left-wing politics in Rome. The film was directed by Alice de Luca and Giacomo Raffaelli.

== Personal life ==
Russo has lived in Rome, along with his parents and his five siblings (two brothers and three sisters). During the filming of I Cesaroni, he had a reunion with his father, the actor and director Claudio Amendola, from whom he says he learned acting and cinematography.

In a 2026 interview, he described his life as ordinary and tranquil. He keeps a part-time job as a retail clerk, given the precarity he says actors often face.

== Filmography ==
Films
Year	Title	Role	Notes
2010	Coincidenze	Little boy	Short film
2016	Come diventare grandi nonostante i genitori	Samuele "Sam" Costa	Feature film debut
2016	Ballerina	Rudolph (voice)	Italian dub
2019	La mia seconda volta	Luca	
2020	Ernesto	Ernesto	

Television
Year	Title	Role	Notes
2004–2005	Incantesimo	Michele Angio	Recurring role; 36 episodes
2005	De Gasperi, l'uomo della speranza	Giorgio	Miniseries
2006–2014; 2026	I Cesaroni	Mimmo Cesaroni	Main role; 145 episodes
2008	Provaci ancora prof	Nino	Main role (season 3); 8 episodes
2015–2017	Alex & Co.	Samuele "Sam" Costa	Main role; 55 episodes
2017	Scomparsa	Luca	Episode: "Episode 6"
2017–2018	L'isola di Pietro	Matteo Sulci	Main role (seasons 1–2); 12 episodes
2018	Don Matteo	Seba	Main role (season 11); 25 episodes
2020	Curon	Mauro Raina	Main role; 7 episodes
2023	Black out	Riccardo Lo Bianco	Main role; 8 episodes
2024	Adoration	Christian	Main role; 6 episodes

== Other experience ==
- Testimonial the advertising campaign of Never Without You with Francesco Totti (2008–2009)
- Testimonial of WPM (2009–2012)
- Anime di vetro, directed by Gabriele Paoli – Videoclip of PQuadro (2010)
- Credi – Music video of Max Pezzali (2011)
