= La Gazzetta dello Sport =

Italian daily sport newspaper

- Tutto il rosa della vita ("All the pink of life")

- Front page, 15 July 2009
- Type: Daily sport newspaper
- Format: Tabloid
- Owner: RCS MediaGroup
- Editor: Andrea Monti
- Founded: 3 April 1896; 130 years ago
- Language: Italian
- Headquarters: Milan, Italy
- Sister newspapers: Corriere della Sera
- ISSN: 1120-5067
- Website: gazzetta.it

La Gazzetta dello Sport (Italian: [la ɡadˈdzetta dello ˈspɔrt]; English: "The Sports Gazette") is an Italian daily newspaper dedicated to coverage of various sports. Founded in 1896, it is the most widely read daily newspaper of any type in Italy (in 2018).

== History and profile ==
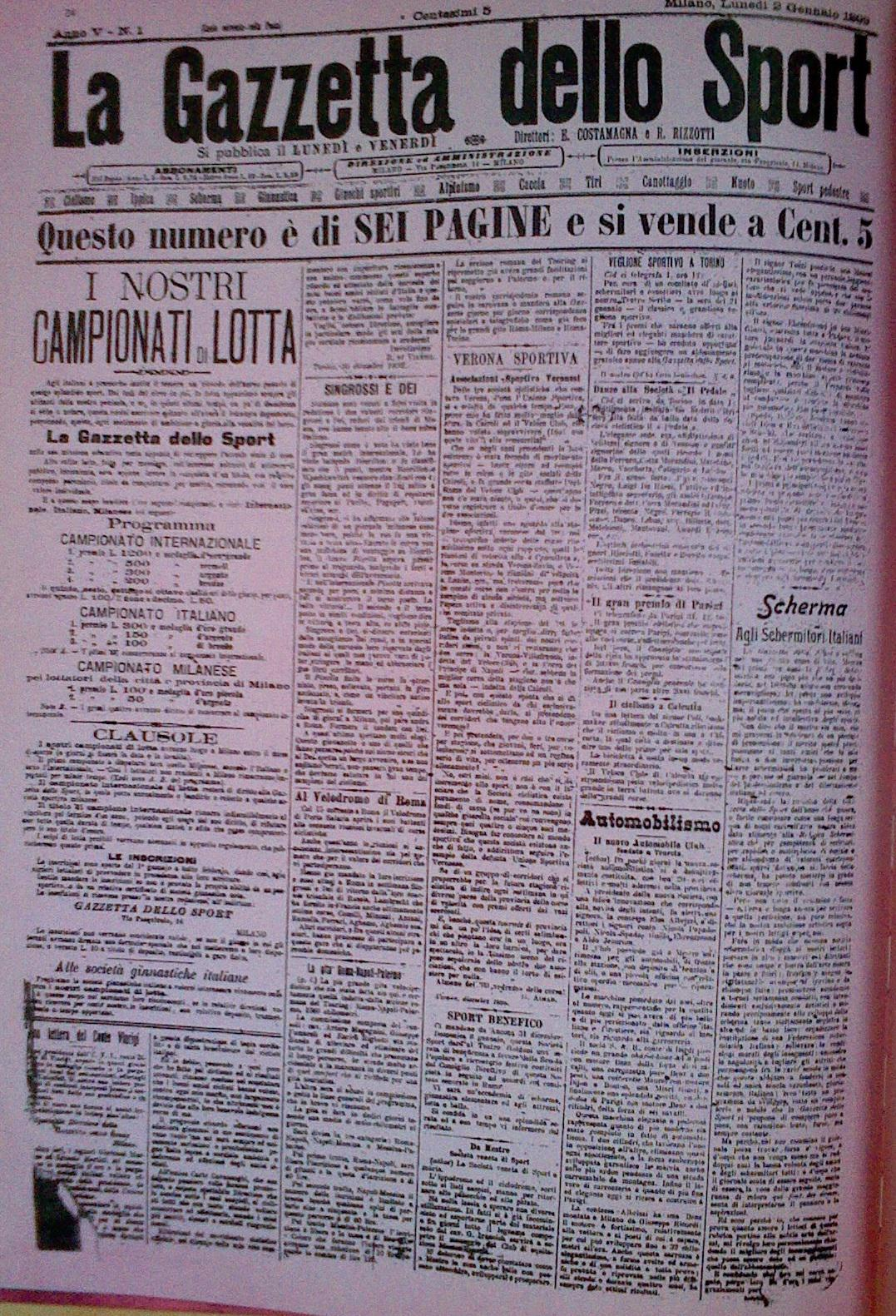
The first issue of La Gazzetta dello Sport printed on pink paper: 2 January 1899

La Gazzetta dello Sport was founded by Eliso Rivera and Eugenio Camillo Costamagna. The first issue was published on 3 April 1896, on time to cover the first modern Olympic Games held in Athens. The paper is based in Milan. Its role extends beyond news reporting and features, to direct involvement in major events, including (since 1909) the organization of the Giro d'Italia (lit. 'Tour of Italy') road cycling stage race.

La Gazzetta dello Sport is part of the RCS MediaGroup since 1976. The paper was published in broadsheet format until 2008 when its format was switched to tabloid. The newspaper, published on pink paper, sells over 400,000 copies daily (more on Mondays when readers want to catch up on the weekend's events), and can claim a readership in excess of three million.

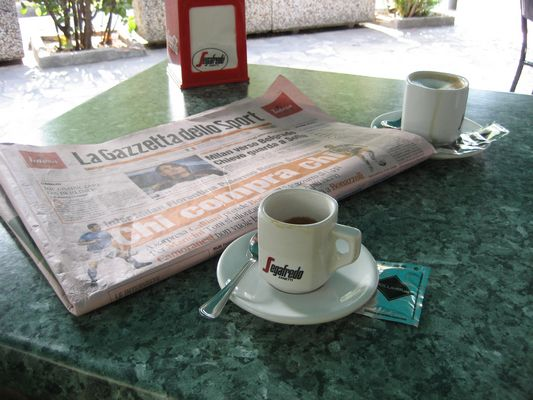
A coffee and a Gazzetta newspaper

Although a wide range of sports are covered in the newspaper, football is given by far most of the coverage. With some 24-28 pages out of 40 devoted to the sport on a daily basis, much of the journalism is speculative and sensationalist rather than the pure reporting of matches. The paper has a good record for campaigning journalism, and played a significant part in exposing the 2006 Serie A scandal that rocked Italian football and led to the relegation of Juventus and points penalties for other leading clubs.

On 3 April 2016, it celebrated its 120th anniversary by printing the newspaper in green, as it was originally.

== Circulation ==
In 1990 the circulation of La Gazzetta dello Sport was 809,000 copies. It was the third best-selling Italian newspaper with a circulation of 401,000 copies in 1997.

The paper had a circulation of 445,000 copies in 2001, making it the twentieth best-selling European newspaper. In 2008 the paper had a circulation of 368,848 copies. The online version of the paper was the eighteenth most visited website in the country in 2011.

== See also ==
- List of newspapers in Italy
- List of non-English-language newspapers with English-language subsections
- Mass media in Italy
- Gazzetta TV
- Gazzetta Sports Awards
- Candido Cannavò, editor from 1983 to 2002
