= Penny on M.A.R.S. =

English-language television series

- Genre: Dramedy
- Created by: Beatrice Valsecchi
- Written by: Beatrice Valsecchi; Fabrizio Lucherini; Giacomo Berdini; Angelo Pastore
- Directed by: Claudio Norza
- Starring: Olivia-Mai Barrett; Shannon Gaskin; Finlay MacMillan; Damien Walsh; Luke Walsh; Olivia Chan; Jessica Alexander; Ryan Dean
- Theme music composer: Giordano Cremona, Federico Mercuri, Marco Sissa and Colin Paul Buffet
- Opening theme: We are the M.A.R.S
- Country of origin: Italy
- Original language: English
- No. of seasons: 3
- No. of episodes: 39 (list of episodes)

Production
- Executive producers: Nadia Grippiolo, Lucio Wilson
- Producer: Piero Crispino
- Production locations: Milan, Italy
- Camera setup: Multi-camera
- Running time: 22 minutes
- Production companies: 3Zero2; Rai Ragazzi; The Walt Disney Company Italy

Original release
- Network: Disney Channel (Italy); Rai Gulp; Disney+ (Italy)
- Release: 7 May 2018 – 3 July 2020

Related
- Alex & Co. (2015 - 2017)

Penny on M.A.R.S. is an English-language Italian teen dramedy television series that premiered on Disney Channel in Italy on 7 May 2018. The series is a spin-off of the Italian series Alex & Co. The series is commissioned by 3Zero2 in cooperation with The Walt Disney Company Italy and Rai Ragazzi. The series premiered on 4 June 2018, on Disney Channel in the United Kingdom. In April 2018, the series was renewed for a second season which premiered on 18 February 2019. The show's third and final season premiered on 17 February 2020, also in the United Kingdom.

== Plot ==
Penny passes the auditions to enter the M.A.R.S. high school, one of the most exclusive performing arts schools in the world. The M.A.R.S. has strict rules and is very competitive, and Penny and her schoolmates have to pass a daily test. Penny has enrolled with a fake name to hide her identity as the daughter of Bakìa, a popular singer of the time, to acquire esteem in her own right separate from her mother's. Bakìa had previously enrolled her daughter in a boarding school in Switzerland so that she could have a "normal" childhood and not hinder her career.

The only one at the M.A.R.S. who knows her real identity is Camilla, Penny's best friend. Sharing a sister-like relationship until they fall for the same boy, Penny will also have to solve the mystery of who her father is.

== Episodes ==
Series	Episodes	Originally released		UK First aired	UK Last aired
Series	Episodes	First released	Last released	UK First aired	UK Last aired
1	16	7 May 2018	25 May 2018	4 June 2018	28 June 2018
2	10	8 April 2019	19 April 2019	18 February 2019	5 March 2019
3	13	3 July 2020	3 July 2020	17 February 2020	9 March 2020

== Cast ==
=== Main ===
Character	Actor	Seasons		
Character	Actor	1	2	3
Penny Mendez	Olivia-Mai Barrett	Protagonist	Protagonist	Protagonist
Camilla Young	Shannon Gaskin	Main Co-Protagonist	Main Co-Protagonist	Main Co-Protagonist
Sebastian Storm	Finlay MacMillan	Protagonist	Protagonist	Co-Protagonist
Sofia Hu	Olivia Chan	Co-Protagonist	Co-Protagonist	Co-Protagonist
Nick Weber	Damien Walsh	Co-Protagonist	Recurring	
Mike Weber (Note: Mike Weber is played by Luke Walsh in Seasons 1 and 3, and by Damien Walsh in Season 2. Damien Walsh also plays Nick Weber in the first two seasons.)	Damien Walsh		Co-Protagonist	
Mike Weber	Luke Walsh	Co-Protagonist		Co-Protagonist
Aleksandr "Sasha" Lukin	Ryan Dean	Co-Antagonist	Co-Protagonist	Co-Protagonist
Lucy Carpenter	Jessica Alexander	Antagonist	Antagonist	
Tom Lauder	Jack Christou		Co-Antagonist	Co-Protagonist
Pete Swanson	Giacomo Vigo		Co-Protagonist	Co-Protagonist
Rob Walker	Keenan Munn-Francis			Protagonist
Vicky Bernhard	Kira Malou			Co-Protagonist
Martha Patel	Amani Lia			Antagonist

=== Recurring ===
Character	Actor	Seasons		
Character	Actor	1	2	3
Freddy Wolf	Ben Richards	Recurring	Recurring	Recurring
Bakìa	Merissa Porter	Recurring	Recurring	Recurring
Debbie Cornish	Hanna Hefner	Recurring	Recurring	Recurring
Raul Storm	Joseph Rye	Recurring		
Mitch Storm	Charlie Gardner	Recurring	Recurring	
Bruce Gold	Michael Rodgers	Recurring	Recurring	Recurring
Roberto Piccolo	William Kenning	Recurring	Recurring	Recurring
Sean McDougal	Alton Terry / Yonv Joseph (Note: Credited as Alton Terry in Season 1, Yonv Joseph in Seasons 2 and 3.)	Recurring	Recurring	Recurring
Ella Johnson	Nathalie Rapti Gomez	Recurring	Recurring	Recurring
Tosca Bauer	Melanie Gray	Recurring	Recurring	Recurring
Arianna Rossi	Arianna Di Claudio	Guest	Guest	Guest
Mrs. Grady	Giorgia Massetti	Guest		
Lisa Cunningham	Katie McGovern	Guest		
Andrew Young	Douglas Dean	Guest		
Mr. Carpenter	Andrea Scarduzio	Guest		
Mrs. Carpenter	Cecilia Gragnani	Guest		
Head physician	Mauro Cipriani		Guest	
Mr. Maki	Yoon Coon Cometti		Guest	
Dave Marshal	Leonardo Ferrari			Guest
Adrian Glaser	Andrea Beruatto			Guest
Simo Ferrari	Asya Rotella			Guest
Mr. Richter	Timothy Martin			Guest

== Production ==
In April 2017, it was announced that The Walt Disney Company Italy planned to produce an English language spin-off from the successful series Alex & Co. The start of shooting for the 17-part first season was planned for Autumn 2017. Penny on M.A.R.S. was produced in English instead of Italian because it was believed that the series could be sold better internationally. The characters Penny, Camilla, Bakìa and Freddy Wolf from Penny on M.A.R.S. had performances in the special episodes (the last episodes) of Alex & Co., in which the spin-off series was introduced. On 29 June 2017, the spin-off series after the last episode of Alex & Co. was officially announced in a teaser, thereby also announcing the title Penny on M.A.R.S..

The first table read for the first season was on 20 September 2017. Shooting for the first season began on 28 September 2017, and ended on 15 December 2017. The shooting took place in Milan and the surrounding area. The backdrop of the Music Arts Reiner School (short M.A.R.S.) is the building of the design department of the Bovisa's headquarters of the Polytechnic University of Milan.

By October 2017, RAI's international sales division Rai Com acquired sales to the series alongside its sister show Alex & Co, marking Rai Com's first international distribution sales to the series with Disney.

In October 2019 when the show was renewed for a third and final season one year prior in 2018, French production and distribution group Lagardère Studios Distribution acquired global distribution rights to the series in an agreement with 3Zero2 taking over distribution from Disney and Rai Com (whom continued distributing and owning the show), joining the show as co-producer with Disney the two continued co-handling sales to the show; the international distribution rights to the show would eventually transferred to Mediawan and its division Mediawan Kids & Family a year later in November 2020.

== Soundtrack ==
The first album from the series was released on 4 May 2016, in Italy. It contains the following list of songs:

No.	Title	Writer(s)	Length
1.	"We Are the M.A.R.S." (Olivia-Mai Barrett & Ryan Dean)	Giordano Cremona; Federico Mercuri; Marco Sissa; Colin Paul Buffet	3:00
2.	"Rain and Shine" (Olivia-Mai Barrett & Shannon Gaskin)	Federica Camba; Daniele Coro; Enrico Sibilla	3:14
3.	"Nobody's Perfect" (Merissa Porter)	Gaetano Cappa	3:16
4.	"Never Doubt I Love" (Olivia-Mai Barrett & Finlay MacMillan)	Abigail Hercules; David Roper; Richard Taylor	3:40
5.	"So Sure" (Olivia-Mai Barrett & Finlay MacMillan)	Steve Rushton; Tim Woodcock	3:24
6.	"Rain and Shine - Ci sarò, ci sarai" (Federica Carta & Olivia-Mai Barrett)	Federica Camba; Daniele Coro; Enrico Sibilla	3:14
