= How to Grow Up Despite Your Parents =

Alex & Co: How to Grow Up Despite Your Parents
- Film poster
- Italian: Come diventare grandi nonostante i genitori
- Directed by: Luca Lucini
- Written by: Gennaro Nunziante
- Starring: Giovanna Mezzogiorno; Margherita Buy; Matthew Modine; Beatrice Vendramin; Leonardo Cecchi; Eleonora Gaggero; Saul Nanni; Federico Russo; Emanuele Misuraca; Chiara Primavesi; Toby Sebastian
- Music by: Fabrizio Campanelli
- Production company: The Walt Disney Company Italy
- Distributed by: Buena Vista International
- Release date: 24 November 2016
- Running time: 90 minutes
- Country: Italy
- Language: Italian
- Box office: $2 million

Alex & Co: How to Grow Up Despite Your Parents (Italian: Come diventare grandi nonostante i genitori) is a 2016 Italian comedy film directed by Luca Lucini. It is based on Disney Channel's TV series Alex & Co..

== Cast ==
- Giovanna Mezzogiorno as Mary Riley
- Margherita Buy as Silvia Rufini
- Matthew Modine as Bob Riley
- Leonardo Cecchi as Alex Leoni
- Eleonora Gaggero as Nicole De Ponte
- Beatrice Vendramin as Emma Ferrari
- Saul Nanni as Christian Alessi
- Federico Russo as Samuele "Sam" Costa
- Emanuele Misuraca as Davide Aiello
- Chiara Primavesi as Evelyn Riley
- Toby Sebastian as Pat Riley
- Roberto Citran as Amedeo Augusto Ferrari
- Paolo Calabresi as Michele
- Ninni Bruschetta as Igor Alessi
- Francesca De Martini as Monica Alessi
- Giovanni Calcagno as Giovanni Aiello
- Aglaia Mora as Paola Aiello
- Paolo Pierobon as Rick De Ponte
- Sara D'Amario as Sara De Ponte
- Sergio Albelli as Diego Leoni
- Elena Lietti as Elena Leoni
- Gabriella Franchini as grandma Wilma
- Federico Russo as himself

== Box office ==
In Italy the film open up to $999 thousand and went on to gross $2 million
