= Gazzetta TV =

Italian terrestrial television channel

- Country: Italy

Programming
- Picture format: 4:3 and anamorphic 16:9 SDTV

Ownership
- Owner: RCS MediaGroup

History
- Launched: February 26, 2015
- Closed: January 6, 2016

Links
- Website: Gazzetta.tv

Availability

Terrestrial
- Digital: DVB-T, LCN 59

Gazzetta TV was an Italian terrestrial television channel owned by RCS MediaGroup, specialized in sports broadcastings edited of the editorial staff of the La Gazzetta dello Sport, Italian sports newspaper.

Launched on 26 February 2015, it forwarded all the matches of the Copa América 2015 live exclusively in Italy.

The channel closed on Jan. 6, 2016 due to financial problems.

== Programming ==
- Gazzetta News
- Copa América 2015
- 2018 FIFA World Cup qualification (CONMEBOL)
- Football League Championship
- Football League Cup
- 2015 Trophée des Champions
- Campeonato Brasileiro Série A
- Barça TV
- CEV Women's Champions League
- 2015 FIVB Volleyball World Grand Prix
- Serie A1 Women (Volley)
- Serie A Basket

== See also ==
- Television in Italy
- Digital terrestrial television in Italy
- La Gazzetta dello Sport
- RCS MediaGroup
