= Saul Nanni =

Italian actor (born 1999)

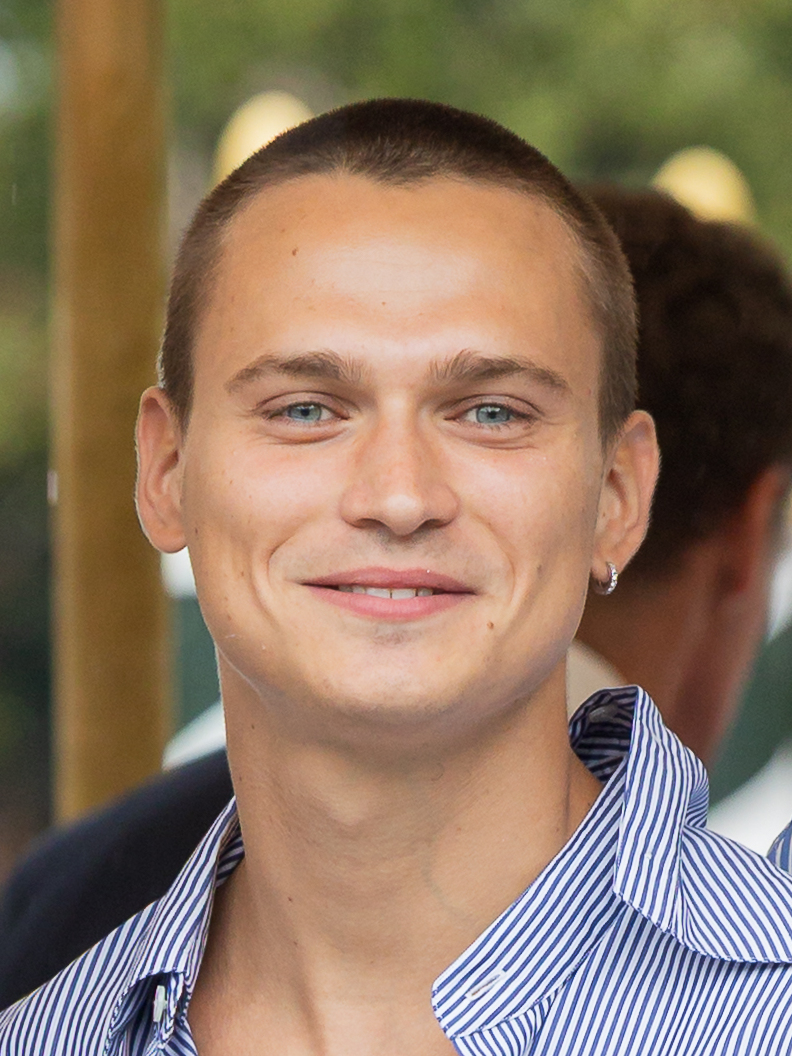
- Nanni at the 2025 Venice International Film Festival
- Born: 4 February 1999 (age 27); Bologna, Italy
- Occupation: Actor
- Years active: 2012–present

Saul Nanni (born 4 February 1999) is an Italian actor. He is best known for playing Christian in the Disney Channel series Alex & Co. (2015–2017), Marco in the comedy drama film Under the Riccione Sun (2020), and Alessandro in the romantic comedy film Love & Gelato (2022).

== Early life ==
Nanni was born in Bologna to a cardiologist father, Samuele, and an endocrinologist mother, Mascia (née Anagni). His father is from Santa Sofia and his mother, who is of Russian descent, is from Galeata. He has a younger brother, Gioele, and a younger sister, Aurora.

He grew up in San Lazzaro di Savena. He attended the Istituto Sant'Alberto Magno and the Liceo ginnasio statale Luigi Galvani in Bologna. He also attended high school in Los Angeles for a year. In 2018, he moved to Milan to attend university.

== Career ==
Nanni began acting after auditioning for a Ringo commercial with footballer Kaká, of whom he was a fan. Although he did not land the commercial, a casting agent reached out to him about appearing in the 2012 miniseries La Certosa di Parma, which marked his acting debut.

== Personal life ==
Nanni is in a relationship with actress Deva Cassel, whom he met while filming The Leopard.

== Filmography ==
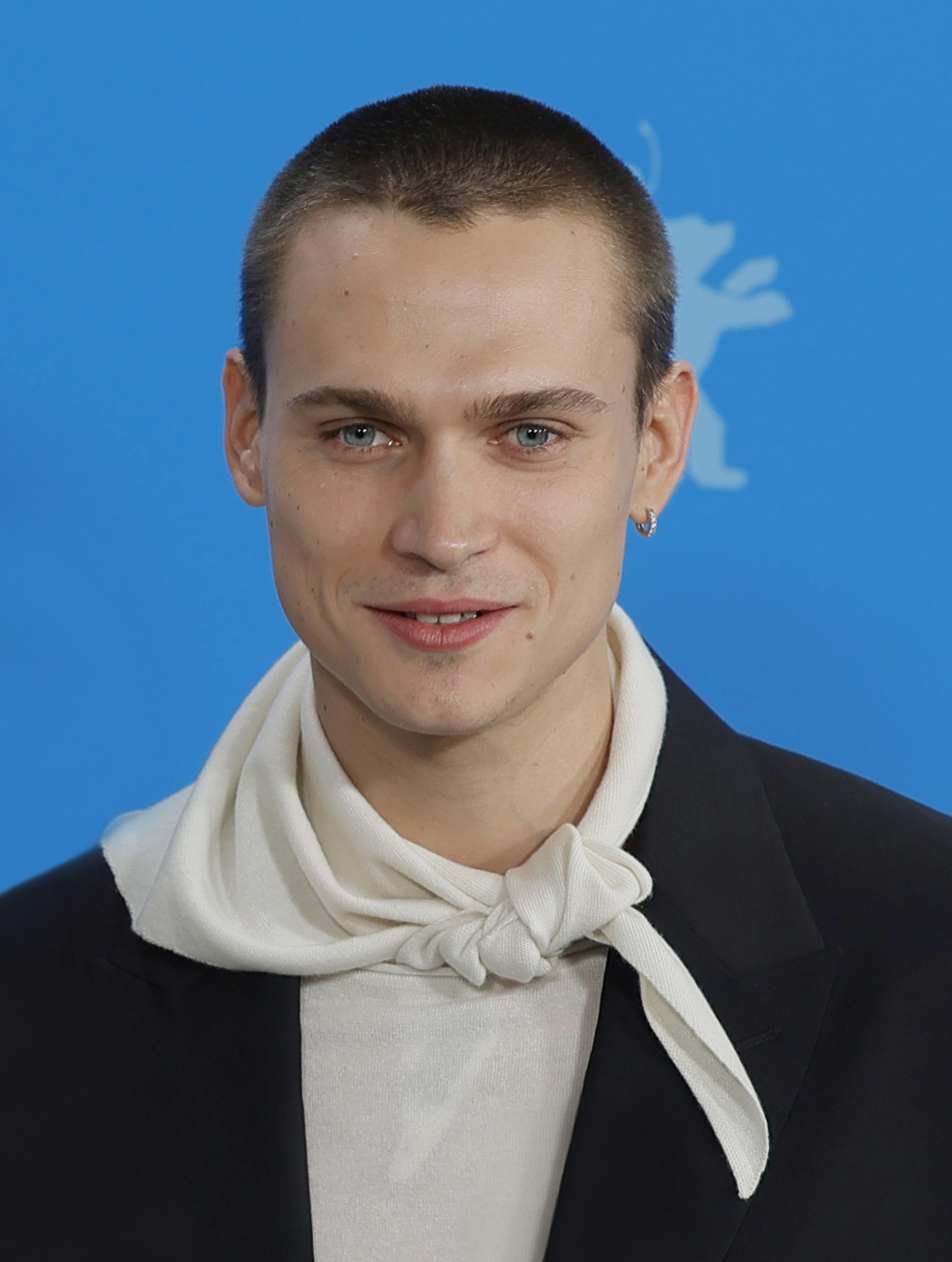
Nanni at the 74th Berlin International Film Festival

=== Film ===
Year	Title	Role	Ref.
2014	A Boss in the Living Room	Vittorio Coso	
2016	How to Grow Up Despite Your Parents	Christian Alessi	
2019	My Brother Chases Dinosaurs	Brune	
2020	Under the Riccione Sun	Marco	
2022	Love & Gelato	Alessandro Albani	
2022	Brado	Tommaso	
2022	I Am the Abyss	Raffaelle	
2024	Here Now	Giulio	
2025	La gioia	Alessio Benedetti	
2025	Brunello, the Gracious Visionary	Brunello	
2026	Idols	Gianni Baltelli	
TBA	Dreamcatchers	TBA	

=== Television ===
Year	Title	Role	Notes	Ref.
2012	The Charterhouse of Parma		Miniseries	
2015–2017	Alex & Co.	Christian Alessi	41 episodes	
2016–2018	Non dirlo al mio capo	Romeo	24 episodes	
2017	Scomparsa	Arturo Trasimeni	12 episodes	
2018	Il fulgore di Dony	Marco Ghia	Television film	
2019	Made in Italy	Flavio	5 episodes	
2019	I ragazzi dello Zecchino d'Oro	Sebastiano	Television film	
2024	Supersex	Young Rocco Siffredi	Episode: "La carne"	
2025	The Leopard	Tancredi Falconeri	6 episodes	
