= Leonardo Cecchi =

Italian actor (born 1998)

- Born: 26 August 1998 (age 27); Minneapolis, Minnesota, U.S.
- Occupation: Actor
- Years active: 2015–present

Leonardo Cecchi (Italian pronunciation: [leoˈnardo ˈtʃekki]; born 26 August 1998) is an Italian actor. He is best known for playing Alex Leoni in the Disney Channel television series Alex & Co. (2015–2017).

== Biography ==
Cecchi was born in Minneapolis to an Italian father and American mother. He grew up in Piscina, Piedmont. He began participating in youth theater productions at the age of six and later attended Liceo Germana Erba, a drama school in Turin.

In 2017, he moved to the United States to pursue acting abroad. That year, he published an autobiography, Un respiro lungo e via.

== Filmography ==
=== Film ===
| Year | Title | Role | Ref. |
|---|---|---|---|
| 2016 | Tini: The Movie | Saúl | |
| 2016 | How to Grow Up Despite Your Parents | Alex Leoni | |
| 2021 | Vote for Santa | Mike | |
| 2022 | Lamborghini: The Man Behind the Legend | Giampaolo Dallara | |
| 2022 | A Christmas Mystery | Harrison Bottoms | |
| 2024 | Prom Dates | Giancarlo | |

=== Television ===
| Year | Title | Role | Notes | Ref. |
|---|---|---|---|---|
| 2015–2017 | Alex & Co. | Alex Leoni | 55 episodes | |
| 2019 | Catch-22 | Bystander #2 | 1 episode | |
| 2019 | The Wrong Stepmother | Tyler | Television film | |
| 2021 | American Horror Stories | Milo | 1 episode | |

== Bibliography ==
- Cecchi, Leonardo (2017). Un respiro lungo e via (in Italian). Mondadori. ISBN 978-8891813275.
