= Eleonora Gaggero =

Italian actress (born 2001)

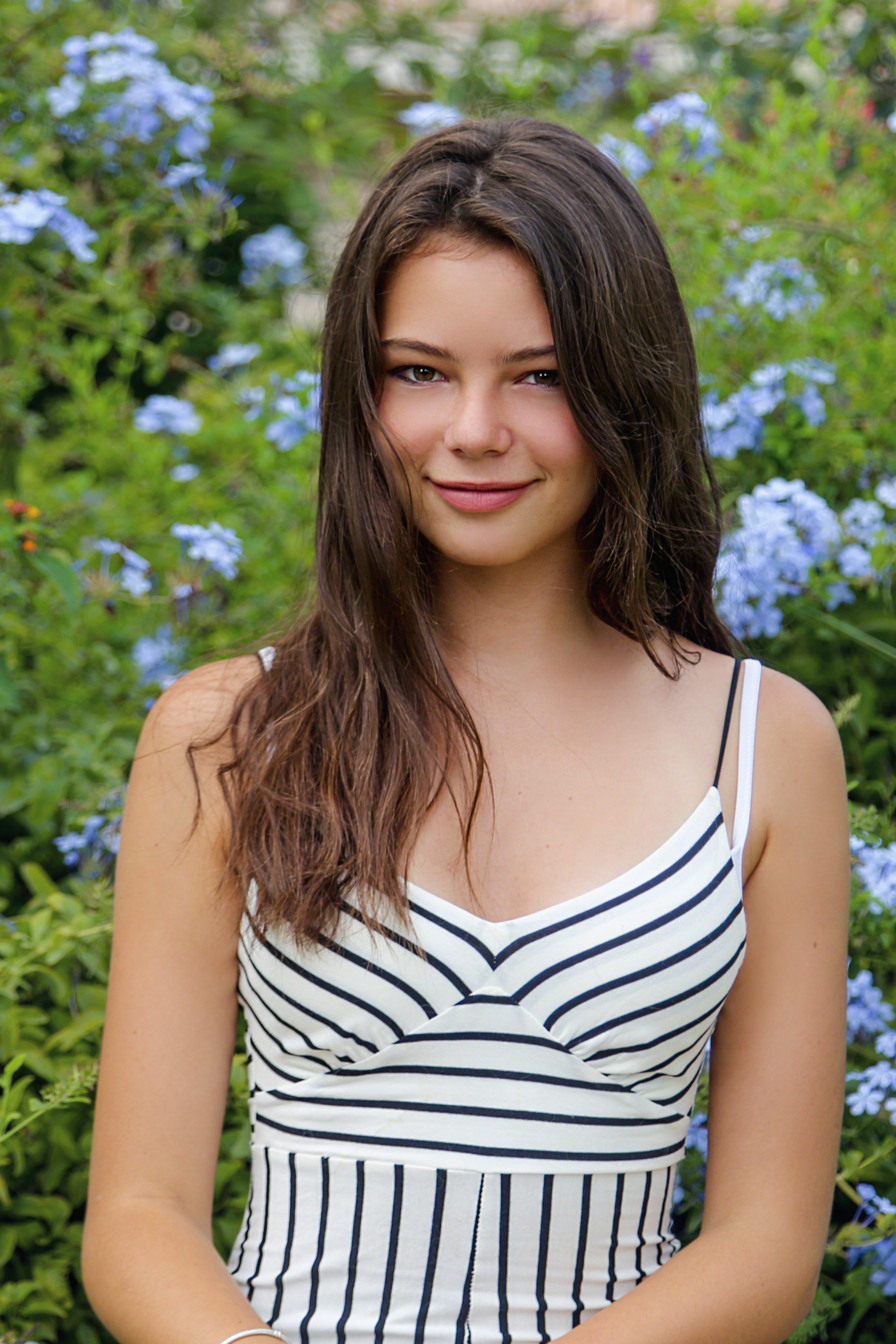
- Gaggero in 2017
- Born: 20 November 2001 (age 23); Genoa, Italy
- Education: IULM University of Milan
- Occupation: Actress
- Years active: 2016–present

Eleonora Gaggero (born 20 November 2001) is an Italian actress and author. She is best known for playing Nicole De Ponte in the Disney Channel television series Alex & Co. (2015–2017).

== Early life ==
Gaggero was born in Genoa. She studied communications at IULM University of Milan.

== Career ==
She made her professional acting debut in the 2014 film Unique Brothers. The following year, she was cast in the Disney Channel television series Alex & Co. (2015–2017). In 2019, she received the Explosive Talent Award at the Giffoni Film Festival. Her 2020 novel, Sul più bello, was adapted into a film of the same name by Alice Filippi.

== Filmography ==
=== Film ===
Year	Title	Role	Notes	Ref.
2014	Unique Brothers	Stella		
2016	How to Grow Up Despite Your Parents	Nicole De Ponte		
2017	Non c'è campo	Virginia Basile		
2019	The Addams Family	Wednesday Addams (voice)	Italian dub; voice role	
2020	Revenge Room	Federica	Short film	
2020	Out of My League	Beatrice		
2021	The Addams Family 2	Wednesday Addams (voice)	Italian dub; voice role	

=== Television ===
Year	Title	Role	Notes	Ref.
2015–2017	Alex & Co.	Nicole De Ponte	55 episodes	
2017	Scomparsa	Camilla Telese	12 episodes	
2024	Those About to Die	Iris	10 episodes	

== Bibliography ==
- Gaggero, Eleonora (2017). Se è con te, sempre (in Italian). Fabbri. ISBN 9788865975763.
- Gaggero, Eleonora (2018). Dimmi che ci credi anche tu (in Italian). Fabbri. ISBN 9788858693407.
- Gaggero, Eleonora (2019). L'ultimo respiro (in Italian). Fabbri. ISBN 9788865976173.
- Gaggero, Eleonora (2020). Sul più bello (in Italian). Fabbri. ISBN 9788891583673.
- Gaggero, Eleonora (2021). Ancora più bello (in Italian). Fabbri. ISBN 9788891585448.
- Gaggero, Eleonora (2022). Red Tears (in Italian). Fabbri. ISBN 9788865977415.
