= Alex & Co. =

Italian TV series

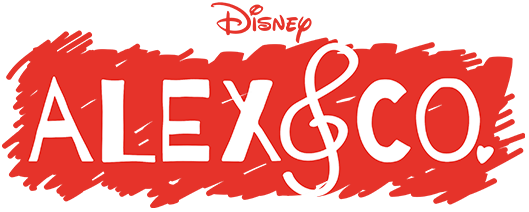
- Genre: Teen sitcom; Musical
- Created by: Marina Efron Versiglia
- Starring: Leonardo Cecchi; Eleonora Gaggero; Beatrice Vendramin; Saul Nanni; Federico Russo; Giulia Guerrini; Olivia-Mai Barrett; Chiara Iezzi; Ben Richards
- Theme music composer: Federica Camba; Daniele Coro; Enrico Sibilla
- Opening theme: "Music Speaks" (Note: Instrumental in the first season; the cast also sings it in the second and third seasons.)
- Country of origin: Italy
- Original language: Italian
- No. of seasons: 3 + 1 special
- No. of episodes: 55 (list of episodes)

Production
- Executive producers: Nadia Grippiolo; Lucio Wilson
- Producer: Piero Crispino
- Camera setup: Videotape; Single-camera
- Running time: 22 minutes
- Production companies: The Walt Disney Company Italy; 3Zero2

Original release
- Network: Disney Channel Italy; Rai Gulp
- Release: 11 May 2015 – 29 June 2017

Related
- Alex & Co: How to Grow Up Despite Your Parents; Penny on M.A.R.S.

Alex & Co. is an Italian television series that first aired on Disney Channel Italy on 11 May 2015. It was created by Marina Efron Versiglia and stars Leonardo Cecchi, Eleonora Gaggero, Beatrice Vendramin, Saul Nanni, and Federico Russo, as well as English actress Olivia-Mai Barrett in the special season episodes.

The first season premiered in Italy on 11 May 2015, and ended on 27 May 2015. The second season debuted on 27 September 2015, ending on 29 November. On 30 January 2016, Disney Channel confirmed that the series was renewed for a third season, which aired from 24 September 2016 to 18 February 2017. The series ended with a set of special episodes from 26 June 2017. An English-dubbed version of the series aired in the United Kingdom, Ireland, Middle Eastern regions and South Africa.

There was a feature film made for the series, How to Grow Up Despite Your Parents (Come diventare grandi nonostante i genitori), and a spin-off series, Penny on M.A.R.S., that premiered on 7 May 2018. The series follows Alex Leoni, an Italian teen, and his friends Christian Alessi, Nicole de Ponte, Sam Costa and Emma Ferrari as they are students at the Melsher Institute.

== Plot ==
=== Episodes ===
Series	Episodes		Originally released	
Series	Episodes		First released	Last released
1	13		11 May 2015	27 May 2015
2	18		27 September 2015	29 November 2015
3	20	10	24 September 2016	22 October 2016
3	20	10	21 January 2017	18 February 2017
Specials	4		26 June 2017	29 June 2017

=== Season 1 ===
The series tells the story of Alex, a smart, brave and well-intentioned teenager who starts high school at the Melcher Institute. It also follows his childhood friends such as Nicole, a sensitive girl who is secretly in love with Alex; and Christian, an athlete who is popular with girls. They quickly become friends with Sam, a shy student, and an attractive girl named Emma, whom Alex falls in love with. They also make the acquaintance of Linda and her group of fake friends; Samantha, Rebecca, Tom, and Barto. Alex soon realizes that high school will not be the party he imagined. Headmaster Ferrari wants the institution to maintain its lead rank in academics, so he bans extracurricular activities like music and acting. Their literature teacher, Professor Belli, encourages the students to follow their dreams nonetheless.

Linda sends Alex and his friends to a forbidden part of the school where the group discovers a secret place in the basement. They form a band called Sound Aloud, and soon after they publish their first song. When Mr. Smith, a record producer, discovers the group, he offers them an album deal, under the condition that Sam be left out. Headmaster Ferrari does not want his daughter Emma to sing at the festival that the band is performing at, so Nicole takes her place to sing with Alex for a duet that the two had written. Linda spills coffee on Nicole's shirt before the concert, so Nicole changes into a dress that she doesn't want to perform in. She stays in the dressing room for two hours. When she finally comes out of her the dressing room in a red dress, she and Alex sing the song he wrote. Together, they finish the song, and after the performance, Alex realizes he has fallen in love with Nicole. He expresses his feelings to her, even though he is already in a relationship with Emma.

At the end of the year, the Melcher Institute wins the academic race, and the principal organizes a year-end concert to raise money for Sam's scholarship. Shortly before the concert, Emma tells Alex that she saw the way he and Nicole acted and they agree to break up because they both don't know what they feel for each other anymore, allowing Alex and Nicole to be together. Nicole overhears Alex telling Christian that he and Nicole can never be together, leading to her getting angry at Alex.

On the night of the concert, Linda traps Nicole and Alex in passageways under the stage. Alex and Nicole try to get out of the tunnels but stop and start talking. Alex tells Nicole why he didn't want to date her at first, and then they make up and share a kiss. They get out of the tunnels and perform with the rest of the group. The concert is a success, and Professor Belli is admitted as their literature teacher again. Headmaster Ferrari announces that they will have spaces to practice music and drama for the following year. In the end, Christian realizes he is in love with Emma, while Alex's parents tell Mr. Belli that they plan on moving to the United States without Alex's knowledge.

=== Season 2 ===
Summer is over and Alex's parents announce that they plan to move the family to the United States. Alex and his older brother Joe are not happy with the news, and with the help of their friends, they try to stay. Eventually, while Joe finds a way to stay, Alex realizes he must move because their mother is ill, and he decides to accompany her. When their mother faints as they pack, the family panics, only to discover that she is not ill, but actually pregnant. The doctor advises her not to leave the country, thus the move was cancelled. Meanwhile, the Melsher Institute begins a new year and the group cannot wait to spend time together again. Rebecca and Sam realize they love each other and become a couple.

The band decides to participate in The Talent, a show where they get the chance to win a recording contract and a European tour. They decide to change the name of the band to "Alex & Co". Meanwhile, Linda and her friends form a band called The Lindas, and her mother buys them a song from Mr. Smith, who is now one of the talent show's panelists. Sam discovers the deception and the group plans to reveal it to the creator of The Talent.

Tension among the members of Alex & Co. cause Alex and Nicole to have an on-and-off relationship; eventually reuniting as a couple. Emma and Christian also date, though a lie told by Linda causes them to break up until Rebecca reveals the truth. Alex & Co. separate for some time, during which Alex is offered a solo recording contract. Instead, he chooses to bring the band back together. As Alex & Co. are about to perform on stage, Joe announces to Alex that their mother has given birth to a baby girl. After meeting his new baby sister, Alex performs "We Are One". The band reveals the deception of The Lindas, and Alex & Co. win The Talent. Nicole feels overwhelmed by the pressure of her being a semi-celebrity, so she decides to leave the band, and end her relationship with Alex.

=== Season 3 ===
==== First half ====
With Nicole having left the band, Alex & Co. starts to record their album, but Emma leaves the band when she loses her voice and has to get surgery. She also finds out that her father was fired as headmaster, but he is rehired soon after. Alex and Nicole mend their friendship, but instead of rejoining the band, she gets involved in saving a local theatre, The Blue Factory, which is run by her former babysitter Sara. Linda returns as a calmer and friendlier person, and The Lindas join Alex and Co. A new student named Clio arrives at the Melsher Institute, who is new in the area after having been bullied in her former school and deciding to quit her dream of being a dancer. She has a troubled relationship with Alex, but he sees through her hardened exterior. They grow closer and start dating.

Frustrated with the direction that their new manager Diana is taking the band in, Alex creates a secret masked internet artist persona named 'Nobody', and releases a song called "I Am Nobody" online, which finds worldwide success. Sam's personality starts to change because of the band's fame, but after a reality check from Rebecca, he returns to his normal self and applies for a scholarship to a prestigious school. Alex & Co. quits the record company and disbands, ending Linda's hopes of fame and turning her back to her old sinister self. Nicole develops feelings for Nobody, who encourages her to write her first song. She kisses him, not knowing he is really Alex. The original Alex & Co. is reunited, and they work to save The Blue Factory together. Sam is accepted to the new school but will have to leave earlier than expected.

At the Blue Factory's fundraiser concert, Rebecca leaves The Lindas after learning that Linda is still trying to destroy Alex & Co. Linda gets her dad to buy the theatre building as a roadblock for the gang. Rebecca sings with Sam, Clio dances on stage for the first time in months, and Alex & Co. performs "Welcome to Your Show", written by Nicole and Emma. After the band says goodbye to Sam, Alex reveals to the world that he is really Nobody.

==== Second half ====
One week after the Nobody reveal, Christian has moved to Australia with his family. Alex works to regain Clio and Nicole's trust after they find out that he was Nobody. Diana also encourages him to continue as a solo artist and manage his own career. After The Blue Factory's fundraiser is a success, the gang opens a record label. The Blue Factory Records, Alex encounters difficulty when the public only seems interested in Nobody. Rebecca and Emma bond over their failed long-distance relationships with Sam and Christian respectively. Ray is revealed to be Nina's son. Rebecca's sister Giada joins The Lindas and secretly admires Ray, ignoring Rebecca's warnings about Linda. Rebecca falls for Matt, who works at a juice shop as a waiter. He is also a pianist, and secretly hides his wealth from everyone.

The girls work to make Nina and Mr. Ferrari a couple. Emma's feelings for Ray grow as they work on the song 'So Far Yet So Close' together. Mr. Ferrari forbids their relationship, seeing Ray as a bad influence, which causes a hurt Nina to break up with Mr. Ferrari. Emma stands up to her dad and stays with Ray, while Mr. Ferrari apologizes to Nina. Nina makes amends with Ray for not giving him the benefit of the doubt. Nicole goes to a songwriting school, but realizes that she's still in love with Alex. She leaves a set of lyrics for a song called "The Magic of Love" with Sara. Alex is given the lyrics to add to his music, but Sara doesn't tell him who wrote them. Clio gets into the academy after auditioning with Alex; Matt also gets into the academy, but Rebecca finds out about his family's wealth. After he explains why he hid the truth from her, they tell each other that they love each other.

Clio's ex-boyfriend Ivan joins forces with Linda to help him get Clio back and to help Linda finally destroy Alex. Ivan steals the Nobody persona and tries to paint Alex as the impostor, but Ivan and Linda argue about the plan. Clio amicably breaks up with Alex when she realizes that he belongs with Nicole. With the gang's help and support, Alex is finally ready to take on Ivan. At the final Nobody challenge at the Blue Factory, Emma and Ray perform "So Far Yet So Close". Alex and Ivan perform "I Am Nobody", both dressed as Nobody and matching each other in dancing skills. Alex's voice modulator was sabotaged, so he sings without his mask. On the other hand, Ivan can't sing without his mask, which Linda had told Ivan was his biggest mistake in challenging Alex. This proves that Ivan is the impostor. Having reclaimed Nobody, Alex officially retires the persona, planning to only perform as Alex Leoni from then on. Nicole returns, entering the theatre as Alex is performing "The Magic of Love". After he realizes that she wrote the lyrics about him and their relationship, they kiss and get back together.

=== Special episodes ===
Alex and Nicole got back together. Alex & Co. are invited to the special edition of The Talent World, a show in which the contestants are the winners of the previous seasons of The Talent worldwide. But Alex and his friends decide to reject the invitation to focus on the music projects of their record company. Nicole in fact has a new big dream; to get her new lyrics sung by Bakìa, the greatest pop star of the moment.

Alex, Nicole, Emma, Ray and Rebecca go to Matt's villa for his birthday. During the party, Nicole discovers that next to Matt's house, Bakìa is shooting a new music video. Nicole tries to get closer to the pop star, but is the victim of a serious accident. Thanks to the help of a girl, named Penny, Nicole is safe, but her savior mysteriously disappeared. Alex and his friends are desperate; Nicole is in a coma and it is unknown if or when she will wake up. Alex knows that the only way Nicole will wake up is if she hears a song by the singer Bakia, so Alex meets the singer Bakia and asks her for a favor, sing her song with her. During the song, Nicole wakes up. Alex realizes it worked and he runs to the hospital to see her. They both said they missed each other and finally they kiss.

== Cast ==
=== Main ===
Actor	Character	Seasons				
Actor	Character	1	2	3		Special
Actor	Character	1	2	3A	3B	Special
Leonardo Cecchi	Alex Leoni	Main	Main	Main	Main	Main
Eleonora Gaggero	Nicole De Ponte	Main	Main	Main	Recurring	Recurring
Beatrice Vendramin	Emma Ferrari	Main	Main	Main	Main	Main
Saul Nanni	Christian Alessi	Main	Main	Main		
Federico Russo	Samuele (Sam) Costa	Main	Main	Main		
Giulia Guerrini	Rebecca Guglielmino	Recurring	Recurring	Recurring	Main	Main
Riccardo Alemanni	Raimondo (Ray)			Recurring	Main	Main
Miriam Dossena	Clio Pinto			Recurring	Main	
Luca Valenti	Matteo (Matt)				Recurring	Main
Olivia-Mai Barrett	Penny Mendez					Main

=== Recurring ===
Actor	Character	Seasons				
Actor	Character	1	2	3		Special
Actor	Character	1	2	3a	3b	Special
Roberto Citran	Amedeo Augusto Ferrari	Recurring	Recurring	Recurring	Recurring	
Debora Villa	Nina	Recurring	Recurring	Recurring	Recurring	
Nicola Stravalaci	Professor «Scorpion» Strozzi	Recurring	Recurring	Recurring	Recurring	
Michele Cesari	Professor Giovanni Belli	Recurring	Recurring	Recurring	Cameo	
Lucrezia Roberta Di Michele	Linda Rossetti	Recurring	Recurring	Recurring	Recurring	Recurring
Asia Corvino	Samantha Ferri	Recurring	Recurring	Recurring	Recurring	Recurring
Arianna Amadei	Giada Guglielmino				Recurring	Recurring
Anis Romdhane	Barto	Recurring	Recurring			
Daniele Rampello	Tom	Recurring	Recurring			
Sara Borsarelli	Diana Jones			Recurring	Cameo	
Enrica Pintore	Sara			Recurring	Recurring	
Paolo Fantoni	Ivan				Recurring	
Shannon Gaskin	Camilla Young					Recurring
Merissa Porter	Bakìa					Recurring
Ben Richards	Freddy Wolf					Recurring
Chiara Iezzi Cohen	Victoria Williams		Recurring			

=== Supporting ===
Actor	Character	Seasons				
Actor	Character	1	2	3		Special
Actor	Character	1	2	3a	3b	Special
Jgor Barbazza	Igor Alessi	Recurring				
Linda Collini	Monica Alessi	Recurring				
Gabriella Franchini	Wilma	Recurring	Recurring			
Sara Ricci	Sara De Ponte	Recurring				
Sara D'Amario	Sara De Ponte					Recurring
Riccardo Festa	Rick De Ponte	Recurring				Recurring
Elena Lietti	Elena Leoni	Recurring	Recurring			
Enrico Oetiker	Joe Leoni	Recurring	Recurring			
Massimiliano Magrini	Diego Leoni	Recurring	Recurring			
Jacopo Coleschi	David		Recurring			
Jody Cecchetto	Jody		Recurring			
Michelle Carpente	Erika				Recurring	Recurring
Yvonne Giovanniello	Sonia					Recurring
Massimiliano Varrese	Arturo					Recurring

== Music ==
Songs are performed by the main cast unless otherwise noted.

=== We Are One (2016) ===
The first album from the series, titled We Are One, was released on 29 January 2016 in Italy. It consists of the songs from the first and second seasons. The first two songs are from the first seasons, while the rest are from the second season. The album features a bonus track, "Wake Up" by The Vamps, who performed the song at The Talent in the final episode of the second season.

No.	Title	Writer(s)	Length
1.	"Music Speaks"	Enrico Sibilla; Federica Camba; Daniele Coro	3:06
2.	"All the While" (Leonardo Cecchi & Eleonora Gaggero)	Enrico Sibilla; Federica Camba; Daniele Coro	3:34
3.	"Unbelievable"	Enrico Sibilla; Federica Camba; Daniele Coro	3:55
4.	"Truth or Dare"	Gaetano Cappa	3:12
5.	"We Are One"	Enrico Sibilla; Federica Camba; Daniele Coro	3:32
6.	"Likewise" (Giulia Guerrini & Federico Russo)	Enrico Sibilla; Federica Camba; Daniele Coro	3:47
7.	"Oh My Gloss!" (Lucrezia Di Michele, Giulia Guerrini, Asia Corvino)	Gaetano Cappa; Salvatore Iorio	3:23
8.	"Incredibile" (Leonardo Cecchi & Beatrice Vendramin)	Enrico Sibilla; Federica Camba; Daniele Coro	3:55
9.	"Music Speaks" (remix)	Enrico Sibilla; Federica Camba; Daniele Coro	3:33
10.	"Wake Up" (The Vamps)	Ammar Malik; Steve Mac; Ross Golan; Kevin Snevely	3:13

=== Welcome to Your Show (2016) ===
The second soundtrack album released on 9 December 2016 contains all songs from the previous album except for the bonus track from The Vamps, plus four new songs from the third season of the series and two new songs from the movie based on the series, Alex & Co: How to Grow Up Despite Your Parents (Come diventare grandi nonostante i genitori).

No.	Title	Writer(s)	Length
10.	"I Am Nobody" (Leonardo Cecchi)	Gaetano Cappa	3:05
11.	"So Far Yet So Close" (Beatrice Vendramin & Riccardo Alemanni)	Gaetano Cappa	3:08
12.	"The Magic of Love" (Leonardo Cecchi)	Enrico Sibilla; Federica Camba; Daniele Coro	3:36
13.	"Welcome to Your Show"	Enrico Sibilla; Federica Camba; Daniele Coro	3:17
14.	"I Can See the Stars" (Leonardo Cecchi, Eleonora Gaggero, Beatrice Vendramin)	Fabrizio Campanelli	3:39
15.	"The Strawberry Place" (Leonardo Cecchi, Eleonora Gaggero, Beatrice Vendramin)	Fabrizio Campanelli	3:58

== Broadcast ==
The first season of the series, consisting of 13 episodes, premiered in Italy on 11 May 2015, and ended on 27 May 2015. The second season of 18 episodes premiered on 27 September 2015, and ended on 29 November 2015. The third season of the series premiered on 24 September 2016, and went on a hiatus on 22 October 2016, after airing the first half of the season, 10 episodes. The movie Alex & Co: How to Grow Up Despite Your Parents (originally titled Come diventare grandi nonostante i genitori), which is based on this series, was released in Italian cinemas on 24 November 2016. The remaining 10 episodes of the third season aired from 21 January 2017 to 18 February 2017.

Four special episodes aired from 26 June 2017 to 29 June 2017, marking the end of the series.

There is an English-language version of the series being broadcast in Middle Eastern regions, Nordic countries, Hungary and Czech Republic, and South Africa.

In South Africa, Season 1 first aired from 3 Marc 2016 to 26 May 2016; Season 2 from 7 July 2016 to 3 November 2016; Season 3 Part 1 from 3 April 2017 to 14 April 2017; and Season 3 Part 2 from 17 July 2017 to 28 July 2017.

On 24 June 2017, the series premiered in the United Kingdom and Ireland on Disney Channel. Series 2 premiered on 2 January 2018. The English dub used is the same as that of the Middle East and South Africa.

== Reception ==
The final episode of the first season reached peaks of 250,000 viewers, of which 150,000 were children aged 4 to 16 years, and 120,000 were girls aged 8 to 16 years.

== Other media ==
=== Film ===
On 2 December 2015, Disney Channel Italy announced the release of a movie based on the series, titled Alex & Co: How to Grow Up Despite Your Parents (Come diventare grandi nonostante i genitori), which was released on 24 November 2016, in Italian cinemas. It premiered in the United States at the Los Angeles Italia Film Festival on 21 February 2017. In the United Kingdom, it was shown on 5 March 2018, on Disney Channel.

=== Spin-offs ===
==== Penny on M.A.R.S. ====
A spin-off series titled Penny on M.A.R.S. was announced on 29 June 2017. It follows the adventures of Penny, the main character in the special episodes of the original show, and her dream to enter the music high school M.A.R.S.. It premiered on Disney Channel Italy on 7 May 2018, and on Disney Channel UK on 4 June 2018.

==== Radio Alex ====
On 30 January 2016, Disney Channel Italy announced a spin-off titled Radio Alex. It aired in Italy on 8 February 2016. It stars Alex as he manages the Melsher Institute radio station where, with the help of his friends, he talks about general topics; posing questions to the audience and transmitting all the successful songs of international artists.

=== Alex & Co. Fan Event ===
On 20 April 2016, the cast of the series performed the songs of the series in a live concert in Milan called Alex & Co. Fan Event.
