= Josh Roush =

American filmmaker

- Born: Middletown, Ohio, United States
- Occupation: Filmmaker
- Notable work: Wrong Reasons, Long Lonesome Highway: The Story of Michael Parks
- Website: anticurrent.com

Josh Roush is an American filmmaker, director and editor whose work spans independent film and punk rock music. He wrote and directed Wrong Reasons and directed the documentary Long Lonesome Highway: The Story of Michael Parks.

== Career ==
Early in his career, Roush worked on Hollywood Babble-On, the live comedy podcast hosted by Kevin Smith and Ralph Garman, beginning with its performances at Universal CityWalk. Known on the show as "Doctor Josh", Roush operated the crowd camera and helped run BabbleVision, the show's video service.

Roush's collaborations with Kevin Smith extended into film production, including working as an assistant to actor Michael Parks on Smith's 2014 film Tusk. Roush and Parks developed a friendship that continued until Parks' death in 2017, later inspiring Roush's documentary Long Lonesome Highway: The Story of Michael Parks. Roush also produced and edited Walrus Yes: The Making of Tusk (2019), a feature-length behind-the-scenes documentary about the film's production. He subsequently directed and edited the feature-length behind-the-scenes documentaries Magnum Dopus: The Making of Jay and Silent Bob Reboot (2020) and The Clerks III Documentary (2022).

Wrong Reasons is a punk rock thriller about the kidnapping of a punk singer and the resulting police investigation and media circus. Beginning in late 2022, Roush accompanied the film on an 11-city theatrical roadshow across the United States. Executive produced by Kevin Smith, Wrong Reasons features music by L7, Channel 3, The Unseen, William Elliott Whitmore, Tim Armstrong, and the Wipers. Roush drew on his connections within the punk music scene to select and license the soundtrack.

The film was subsequently released on DVD and digital platforms through MVD Entertainment Group, with a further DVD release through Bounty Entertainment. In May 2024, Wrong Reasons was given a special screening as part of Punk Rock Bowling in Las Vegas, hosted by executive producer Kevin Smith. The film was later screened at The Punk Rock Museum in 2025, hosted by CJ Ramone.

In 2025, Roush released Long Lonesome Highway: The Story of Michael Parks, a documentary he wrote, directed and edited, with Kevin Smith serving as executive producer. The film features interviews with Kurt Russell, Mickey Rourke, Leonard Maltin and Robert Rodriguez, among others. Beginning in April 2025, Roush toured the film across the United States, accompanying screenings with question-and-answer sessions. It was subsequently released on DVD and streaming.

In 2026, Roush began a collaboration with Social Distortion and frontman Mike Ness, co-directing several visual projects for the band, including "Partners in Crime", "The Way Things Were", "Crazy Dreamer", "Walk Away (Don't Look Back)", and "Wicked Game". Roush also directed and edited the video-wall visuals for the band's 2026 tour.

His work in punk music has included directing music videos and live performances featuring artists including The Unseen, The Last Gang, Bad Cop/Bad Cop, Tim Armstrong, The Aggrolites, and Me First and the Gimme Gimmes. Roush has directed videos of MUSACK benefit performances, including appearances by Tim Armstrong, Jesse Michaels and members of the Specials. In 2026, he made the short documentary 1, 2, 3, 4... 50 Years of the Ramones, which screened at Hollywood Forever Cemetery, and filmed the anniversary celebration.

== Selected filmography ==
=== Feature documentaries ===
Year	Title	Role
2019	Walrus Yes: The Making of Tusk	Producer, Editor
2020	Magnum Dopus: The Making of Jay and Silent Bob Reboot	Director, Editor
2022	The Clerks III Documentary	Director, Editor
2025	Long Lonesome Highway: The Story of Michael Parks	Writer, Director, Editor

=== Short documentaries ===
Year	Title	Role
2025	Rumors: In the Studio with The Last Gang	Director
2026	1, 2, 3, 4... 50 Years of the Ramones	Director, Editor

=== Feature film ===
Year	Title	Role
2023	Wrong Reasons	Writer, Director, Editor

=== Comedy special ===
Year	Title	Role
2024	AJ Wilkerson: Captain Autism	Director, Editor

=== Music videos ===
Year	Artist	Title	Role
2019	The Aggrolites	"Pound for Pound"	Director
2023	Bad Cop/Bad Cop	"Safe and Legal"	Director
2024	William Elliott Whitmore	"Darkness Comes"	Director
2025	The Raging Nathans	"The Grudge"	Director
2025	Empired	"Money"	Director
2026	Spike and the Gimme Gimmes	"We Are the World"	Director
2026	Bruce Zebal (Empired) and Linh Le (Bad Cop/Bad Cop)	"Repose"	Director
2026	The Unseen	"The Enemy of My Enemy (Is Still a Fucking Snake)"	Director

=== Live music videos ===
Year	Artist	Title	Role
2018	Tim Armstrong	"East Bay Night"	Director
2022	The Specials & Tim Armstrong	"Gangsters"	Director
2023	Tim Armstrong and Jesse Michaels	"Take Warning"	Director
2026	Spike and the Gimme Gimmes	"Girls Just Want to Have Fun"	Director

=== Lyric videos and visualizers ===
Year	Artist	Title	Role
2026	Social Distortion	"Partners in Crime"	Co-director (with Mike Ness)
2026	Social Distortion	"The Way Things Were"	Co-director (with Mike Ness)
2026	Social Distortion	"Crazy Dreamer"	Co-director (with Mike Ness)
2026	Social Distortion	"Walk Away (Don't Look Back)"	Co-director (with Mike Ness)
2026	Social Distortion	"Wicked Game"	Co-director (with Mike Ness)

=== Live visuals ===
Year	Artist	Production	Role
2026	Social Distortion	Tour video-wall visuals	Director, Editor
