= The Green Hornet (TV series) =

American action television series (1966–1967)

- Genre: Action; Adventure; Superhero
- Created by: George W. Trendle; Fran Striker
- Directed by: William Beaudine; Leslie H. Martinson; Larry Peerce; Allen Reisner; Seymour Robbie
- Starring: Van Williams; Bruce Lee; Walter Brooke; Lloyd Gough; Wende Wagner
- Narrated by: William Dozier
- Theme music composer: Nikolai Rimsky-Korsakov
- Opening theme: "Flight of the Bumblebee", arranged by Billy May conducted by Lionel Newman performed by Al Hirt
- Composers: Billy May; (background score)
- Country of origin: United States
- Original language: English
- No. of seasons: 1
- No. of episodes: 26

Production
- Executive producer: William Dozier
- Producers: Richard M. Bluel (23 episodes); Stanley Shpetner (2 episodes)
- Cinematography: Jack Marta; Carl Guthrie; Charles Clarke
- Editors: Fred R. Feitshans Jr.; Noel Scott
- Running time: 30 min.
- Production companies: Greenway Productions; 20th Century-Fox Television

Original release
- Network: ABC
- Release: September 9, 1966 – March 17, 1967

The Green Hornet is an American action television series broadcast on ABC during the 1966–1967 television season, starring Van Williams as the Green Hornet/Britt Reid and Bruce Lee as Kato. It was produced and narrated by William Dozier, and filmed by 20th Century-Fox.

The single-season series premiered September 9, 1966, and ran through March 17, 1967, lasting 26 episodes; ABC repeated the series after its cancellation by the network, until July 14, 1967, when The Green Hornet had its last broadcast on network television. With the later success of Lee as a premiere star of the martial arts film genre, the series has become a cult favorite.

The Van Williams–Bruce Lee The Green Hornet remains unavailable for home video because of licensing issues. 20th Century-Fox has always had the broadcast rights, so the series can be shown today on broadcast and cable television. The non-television rights were controlled by the owner of the character, George W. Trendle (as licensing agent The Green Hornet, Inc.); this entity survived Trendle's death in 1972 and still functions today.

== Plot ==
Playboy bachelor and media mogul Britt Reid is the owner and publisher of the Daily Sentinel newspaper but, as the masked vigilante Green Hornet, he fights crime with the assistance of his butler/chauffeur and martial arts expert partner, Kato, and his weapons-enhanced car, a custom Chrysler Imperial called the "Black Beauty". On police records, the Green Hornet is a wanted criminal, but, in reality, the Green Hornet is masquerading as a criminal so that he can infiltrate and battle criminal gangs, leaving them and the incriminating evidence for police arrival. Beyond Kato, Britt's dual identity is known only to his secretary Lenore "Casey" Case and District Attorney Frank P. Scanlon.

Britt's motive for fighting crime was explained on-screen: His father had died in prison after having been framed for a crime he did not commit.

== Origin ==
The character had originated as the star of a radio series (1930s to 1950s), and it had previously been adapted to movie serials, comic books, and other media. Owing in part to George W. Trendle and Fran Striker having created all the central characters and developed the core formats of both radio shows, Britt Reid shares the same family name as the Lone Ranger, as Britt's father had been the Lone Ranger's nephew, Dan Reid.

== Cast ==
- Van Williams as Britt Reid/Green Hornet: the owner and publisher of The Daily Sentinel and masked fighting hero, who masquerades as a villain.
- Bruce Lee as Kato: Britt Reid's valet and partner, who is also the Green Hornet's aide.
- Wende Wagner as Lenore "Casey" Case: Reid's secretary at the Daily Sentinel, one of only two other people who know the true identities of the Green Hornet and Kato.
- Lloyd Gough as Mike Axford: a police reporter for the Daily Sentinel.
- Walter Brooke as District Attorney Frank P. Scanlon: the other one of only two other people who know the true identities of the Green Hornet and Kato, and who know the Green Hornet is a good guy.
- William Dozier as The Narrator.

== Production ==
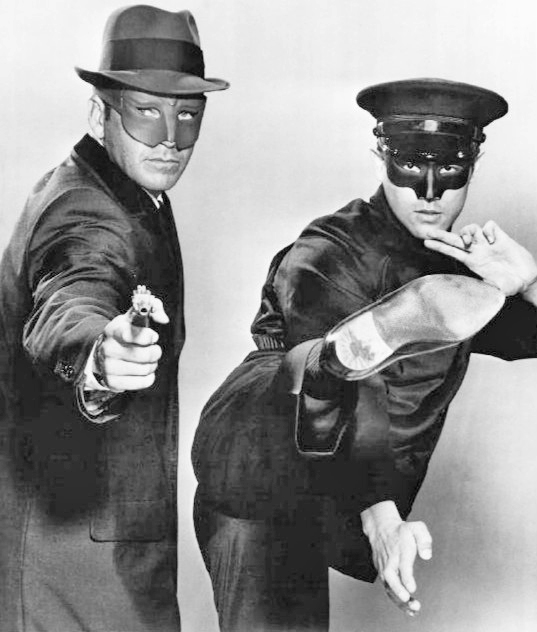
Van Williams and Bruce Lee, 1966

Despite character co-creator George W. Trendle's efforts to generate interest in a Green Hornet TV series in 1951 and 1958, it was not until the success of ABC's 1960s Batman series that the network decided to adapt the venerable radio and movie-serial character. The task was taken on by William Dozier who produced and narrated the series. The series stars Van Williams as the Green Hornet and introduced martial artist Bruce Lee to American television audiences as his partner, Kato.

Unlike the campy and humorous Batman series, The Green Hornet was played straight. Though it was canceled after one season, Lee became a major star of martial arts movies. Lee's popularity in Hong Kong, where he was raised, was such that the show was marketed there as The Kato Show. It was Lee's insistence that Kato be played as a kung fu expert—rather than an American-style fisticuffs fighter—that pushed the directors to rethink the character's portrayal. The Green Hornet was the first time broad swaths of the American public saw kung fu and this led to its increasing popularity. Indeed, Van Williams took lessons from Lee so that he could do some of the increasingly popular moves as well.

The Green Hornet and Kato also appear in three episodes of Batman; "The Spell of Tut" (as a brief cameo) and "A Piece of the Action"/"Batman's Satisfaction", with Reid mentioning that he and Bruce Wayne had been acquaintances and rivals since childhood. Though other characters in the story are all led to believe wrongly that the Green Hornet & Kato are villains, as on The Green Hornet, Roger C. Carmel played the real villain, who called himself Colonel Gumm.

=== Differences from radio version ===
As with the later years of the radio version, secretary Lenore "Casey" Case (played by Wende Wagner) is again aware of Reid's secret, and the Hornet also has a confidant within the law enforcement community, but now he is District Attorney Frank P. Scanlon (played by Walter Brooke). This character was changed from the original's police commissioner because the Batman TV series was already using Commissioner Jim Gordon (played by Neil Hamilton) as the hero's official contact, and William Dozier, the executive producer of both programs, wanted to downplay comparisons between the two shows.

Michael Axford (Lloyd Gough), the bodyguard turned reporter of the radio series, is now solely a police reporter for The Daily Sentinel, the newspaper owned by Britt Reid/the Green Hornet. The first episode, "The Silent Gun", provides a connection between the radio and the TV series, as Axford reminds Reid of the "old days" when he lived in the same apartment with Reid's father, which hints that Reid's father may have been the Green Hornet of the radio series. In this series, Reid owned a television station as well.

There were visual differences as well. Promotional artwork for the radio program and the comic books of the day depicted the Hornet wearing a mask that covered his face below the eyes (the two Universal Studios Saturday matinee serials contained a full face mask with eye holes) while Kato wore goggles. Here, both men wear masks that cover only the upper portions of their faces. These masks initially had a stylized angularity that soon proved problematic: neither man could see much. They were soon replaced with masks molded to the performers' faces.

In a technological update, the Hornet carried a telescoping device called the Hornet's Sting, which projected ultrasonic soundwaves. He most frequently used it to open locked doors, although he was also seen using it to set things on fire (presumably by vibrating them and causing heat through friction) and to threaten criminals to get information. In the episode "The Secret of the Sally Bell", the Hornet used it to explode a thug's gun. He also employed a Hornet knockout gas gun, a carry-over from the radio series.

In the television version, Kato used green "sleeve darts" for a ranged attack to counter enemies at a distance. The impression Bruce Lee made at the time is demonstrated by Kato's Revenge Featuring the Green Hornet, a TV series tie-in coloring book produced by Watkins & Strathmore.

=== Theme music and opening ===
Nikolai Rimsky-Korsakov's orchestral interlude, "Flight of the Bumblebee", used for the radio series, was so strongly identified with The Green Hornet that a similar, jazz-styled theme modeled after the Rimsky-Korsakov piece was used for the series, composed and arranged by Billy May, who also composed the background scores, and conducted by Lionel Newman, with trumpet solo performed by Al Hirt. Hirt recorded a longer, stereo version of the theme with a somewhat different arrangement for his album "The Horn Meets The Hornet". A similar recording titled "The Green Bee" recorded by trombonist Urbie Green that appears on Green's 21 Trombones album has also been considered as the TV series theme. A rollicking 45RPM version of the theme was released as "The Green Hornet" by The Ventures.

Each episode begins with the following monologue, narrated by producer William Dozier

Another challenge for the Green Hornet, his aide Kato, and their rolling arsenal, the Black Beauty. On police records, a wanted criminal, the Green Hornet is really Britt Reid, owner-publisher of the Daily Sentinel; his dual identity is known only to his secretary, and to the district attorney. And now, to protect the rights and lives of decent citizens, rides The Green Hornet!

Years later, the version of the theme from "The Horn Meets The Hornet" was featured in the 2003 film Kill Bill, Vol. 1, in which director Quentin Tarantino paid tribute to Kato by featuring the dozens of sword-fighting members of "The Crazy 88" wearing Kato-style masks during one of the film's fight sequences.

== Episodes ==
No.	Title	Directed by	Written by	Original release date	Prod. code
1	"The Silent Gun"	Leslie H. Martinson	Ken Pettus	September 9, 1966	9804
In this premiere episode, Dave Bannister is shot at a funeral with 20 witnesses present, and not a shot is heard, not even by the Green Hornet's friend, District Attorney Frank P. Scanlon, who was also attending. A messenger from a Brokerage House, carrying $5000 in negotiable bonds, is the Silent Gun's second victim. The Green Hornet and Kato respond in the famous Black Beauty and hit the streets to track down the villainous culprit. Lloyd Bochner guests.
2	"Give 'Em Enough Rope"	Seymour Robbie	Gwen Bagni and Paul Dubov	September 16, 1966	9806
Joe Sweek, waiting to meet Daily Sentinel reporter Mike Axford to sell him photos proving an insurance claim to be fraudulent, is manipulated into a nearby warehouse and murdered by a man in black swinging from a rope. The Green Hornet plans a surprise visit to the claimant, Alex Colony, to propose a partnership with him in his "accident" racket.
3	"Programmed for Death"	Larry Peerce	Lewis Reed (story), Jerry Thomas (teleplay)	September 23, 1966	9802
After reporter Pat Allen is killed in the Daily Sentinel's eighth-floor city room by a leopard, Britt Reid finds a transmitter in a cigarette box. Later, D.A. Scanlon informs Britt of the discovery of a perfect diamond on Allen's desk. Digging around, Reid suspects that the gemologist had been working on producing synthetic diamonds, and the Green Hornet takes an interest in him. Although the third episode aired by ABC, this is generally believed to be the series' original pilot, in part due to the fact that stars Van Williams and Bruce Lee wear angularly stylized masks rather than those molded to their faces seen in other episodes. This episode was also released as a Sawyers' ViewMaster stereoscopic set.
4	"Crime Wave"	Larry Peerce	Sheldon Stark	September 30, 1966	9803
A scientist predicts crimes with a computer that implicates the Green Hornet.
5	"The Frog Is a Deadly Weapon"	Leslie H. Martinson	William L. Stuart	October 7, 1966	9805
Private investigator Nat Pyle informs Britt that he has proof, for a fee, that presumed-dead racketeer Glen Connors is still alive. Shortly later, Nat is found floating dead in the harbor from a possible boating accident. Reid thinks otherwise and has a special interest in proving Pyle was murdered because it was Connors who had framed Reid's father, leading to the father's imprisonment and death. Hollywood veteran Victor Jory plays the villain.
6	"Eat, Drink, and Be Dead"	Murray Golden	Richard Landau	October 14, 1966	9807
An illegal bootleg liquor ring devised by Henry Dirk forces a stronghold on bars in the town to buy from them. As reporter Mike Axford tries to follow a lead to the racketeers, he becomes kidnapped. To get in and save Axford, the Green Hornet approaches Dirk for a cut of his action. The bootlegger and his helicopter, from which he drops bombs on his non-conformists, is a challenge to the Black Beauty.
7	"Beautiful Dreamer: Part 1"	Allen Reisner	Lorenzo Semple, Jr., and Ken Pettus	October 21, 1966	9808
Seems that wealthy and prominent members of the community have been executing crimes and then forgetting that they ever happened - including Miss Case, who's hypnotized into nearly killing Britt. Eventually, the District Attorney and the Green Hornet find that Peter Eden, owner of the very high-class spa called the Vale of Eden, has been implanting "suggestions" into his clients' subconscious minds via his treatments.
8	"Beautiful Dreamer: Part 2"	Allen Reisner	Lorenzo Semple, Jr., and Ken Pettus	October 28, 1966	9809
Part two picks up with a Green Hornet visit and a proposition for Peter Eden, owner of the Vale of Eden. After Peter uses Vanessa Vane in an almost successful attempt to double-cross the Hornet, the Hornet re-visits Eden and uses his own dream machine on Peter to foil the last crime for the evening and get him to confess everything to the police.
9	"The Ray Is for Killing"	William Beaudine	Lee Loeb	November 11, 1966	9801
A charity art auction of fine paintings at Britt Reid's home is interrupted on live television by three masked, gun-toting criminals. The police, nearby, manage to wound one of the thieves, but before they can arrest the other two, a laser ray is unleashed on their squad car with devastating results. The Green Hornet and Kato find themselves in quite a confrontation against this portable killing machine - especially after Miss Case, whom the Hornet sent to track them with a secret device, becomes their hostage.
10	"The Preying Mantis"	Norman Foster	Charles Hoffman and Ken Pettus (teleplay) Charles Hoffman (story)	November 18, 1966	9810
Organized crime's "Protection" Boss Duke Slate decides it's time to acquire "the city's Chinatown district" and uses Low Sing's tong to handle his influence. Low Sing, a martial arts professional, instructs his craft to his gang using the actions of a caged Praying Mantis, analogizing its intricate moves to proper Kung-Fu application. After a kidnapping that Low Sing engineers, a challenge between Low Sing and Kato is inevitable. Academy Award-nominee Mako plays Low Sing. Keye Luke, the man who previously played Kato in the 1940s film serials and would later appear in Kung Fu as Caine's master in some flashback segments of the show, has an uncredited role as Mr. Chang.
11	"The Hunters and the Hunted"	William Beaudine	Jerry Thomas	November 25, 1966	9811
Big-game hunters are using mobsters as quarry—but their next target may be their most dangerous game yet, the Green Hornet.
12	"Deadline for Death"	Seymour Robbie	Ken Pettus	December 2, 1966	9812
After a rash of wealthy homes are burglarized shortly after reporter Mike Axford writes a feature on them, he becomes so suspicious that he places himself at the next possible home to be targeted, only to find himself being arrested and put behind bars, for suspicion of murder when the home's butler is killed in the robbery. D. A. Scanlon is so convinced of Axford's guilt that only the Green Hornet is willing to investigate Mike's photographer.
13	"The Secret of the Sally Bell"	Robert L. Friend	William L. Stuart	December 9, 1966	9813
The Sally Bell, a cargo ship with $2 million in narcotics en route to the United States from Hong Kong, after initially being lost at sea with all hands of her crew, mysteriously shows up at a salvage yard. The only survivor, Gus Wander, knows "The Secret" of her special cargo with only one big problem: he is currently unconscious due to a blast from the Hornet Sting.
14	"Freeway to Death"	Allen Reisner	Ken Pettus	December 16, 1966	9815
Britt Reid orders Mike Axford to team up with the Green Hornet to uncover the ringleader in an insurance scam. Mike reluctantly agrees, but later tries to expose the ringleader alone, leaving it up to the Green Hornet and Kato to save him before it is too late. Guest starring Jeffrey Hunter.
15	"May the Best Man Lose"	Allen Reisner	Judith Barrows and Robert Guy Barrows	December 23, 1966	9814
At election time, District Attorney Scanlon is running for another term, but someone wants to remove him from the ballot - his challenger's brother, whom the challenger doesn't realize is willing to commit high crime as well as murder to help him win.
16	"The Hornet and the Firefly"	Allen Reisner	William L. Stuart	December 30, 1966	9817
An arsonist wreaks havoc setting fire to buildings at the stroke of midnight. The Green Hornet and the District Attorney work behind the scenes to aid the Commissioner in putting a stop to this hot situation. The Commissioner refuses to enlist the aid of a retired top arson investigator because his work had previously cost him an eye, but reporter Mike Axford suggests to Britt Reid that the Daily Sentinel can put him to work. Mike is in for a very big surprise.
17	"Seek, Stalk and Destroy"	George Waggner	Jerry Thomas	January 6, 1967	9816
A tank crew who served together in Korea steals a tank to free their former captain from prison before he is executed for the murder of their ex-commanding officer. It falls to the Green Hornet and Kato both to stop them before they can accomplish their goal and to uncover the real killer.
18	"Corpse of the Year: Part 1"	James Komack	Ken Pettus	January 13, 1967	9818
A carbon copy of the Green Hornet's Black Beauty attacks a Daily Sentinel delivery truck and terminates its driver right in front of Britt Reid. Then the Daily Sentinel offices have an explosive visit from a Green Hornet impostor, leading the real Green Hornet on a cat-and-mouse chase of his shadow car disrupting Daily Sentinel deliveries. Celia Kaye guest stars as Melissa Neal.
19	"Corpse of the Year: Part 2"	James Komack	Ken Pettus	January 27, 1967	9819
After another death—of Simon Neal, publisher/owner of the Daily Express, at the hands of the phony Green Hornet, part 2 begins with Britt Reid bringing one of the Daily Express's previous employees, Dan Scully, into the Daily Sentinel's staff to help investigate Simon's termination. After finding out from Sabrina Bradley, Managing Editor of the Daily Express, that Simon had had a copy of the Black Beauty produced for the Press Club's Masquerade Ball, the real Green Hornet sets a trap with her help.
20	"Ace in the Hole"	William Beaudine	Stan Silverman, and Robert Lees	February 3, 1967	9820
When Mike Axford unexpectedly shows up at a meeting of mobsters Phil Trager, Steve Gant, and the Green Hornet, he gets shot. The Hornet fools the other two into believing Mike has been killed and tries to manipulate them into taking each other out. The plan may fail and cost Axford, the Green Hornet, and Kato their respective lives when the reporter reveals that he is still very much alive. Guest starring Richard Anderson and Richard X. Slattery.
21	"Bad Bet on a 459-Silent"	Seymour Robbie	Judith Barrows and Robert Guy Barrows	February 10, 1967	9821
Britt Reid must figure out how to get medical attention for a wound he received as the Green Hornet, as well as how to stop two cops who are using silent alarm calls for their own profit.
22	"Trouble for Prince Charming"	William Beaudine	Ken Pettus	February 17, 1967	9822
After the Green Hornet prevents the assassination of Prince Rafil, his blonde American fiancée, Janet Prescott is kidnapped, and the prince is ordered to abdicate in order to save her.
23	"Alias The Scarf"	Allen Reisner	William L. Stuart	February 24, 1967	9823
When a wax museum's figure of The Scarf, an infamous strangler from 20 years ago, is replaced in the center display spot by effigies of the Green Hornet and Kato, the waxen form of the Scarf seemingly comes to life and starts attacking people. Using the museum researcher's manuscript about the Scarf, the Green Hornet and Kato attempt to snare the killer before he claims any more victims. Horror film star John Carradine plays the researcher.
24	"Hornet Save Thyself"	Seymour Robbie	Don Tait	March 3, 1967	9824
As a surprise birthday party begins for Britt, a handgun given as a present to Britt seemingly discharges itself, fatally shooting ex-employee Eddie Rech. In reverse of his usual situation, Britt Reid hides from the police by becoming the Green Hornet. There is no "Produced by..." credit on this episode.
25	"Invasion from Outer Space: Part 1"	Darrell Hallenbeck	Arthur Weingarten	March 10, 1967	9825
The arrival of visitors from outer space seemingly coincides with an Air Force convoy transporting top-secret electronic equipment and an H-Bomb missile warhead. Having Britt's secretary, Lenore "Casey" Case, taken hostage makes the situation very touchy. Brett King guest stars in this episode, his last screen role, as Major Jackson.
26	"Invasion from Outer Space: Part 2"	Darrell Hallenbeck	Arthur Weingarten	March 17, 1967	9826
Part 2 begins with the Green Hornet using his tracking signal to close in on the visitors from outer space and their mystery. This is the last episode of the series.

== Crossover with Batman TV series ==
There were several comparisons and crossovers from Batman to Green Hornet, both on TV and in movies.

=== The Green Hornet and Kato on Batman ===
Van Williams and Bruce Lee make a cameo appearance as the Green Hornet and Kato in "window cameos" while Batman and Robin were climbing a building during the first part of the second season Batman two-parter "The Spell of Tut", which aired on September 28, 1966.

There is also mention of The Green Hornet TV series on the Batman on the episode "The Impractical Joker", broadcast on November 16, 1966, as Alfred, Dick Grayson, and Bruce Wayne are watching television. The latter says, "It's time to watch The Green Hornet!"

Later that same season, the Green Hornet and Kato appeared in the two-part second-season episodes "A Piece of the Action" and "Batman's Satisfaction", which aired on March 1–2, 1967. The Green Hornet and Kato are in Gotham City to bust a counterfeit stamp ring run by Colonel Gumm (portrayed by Roger C. Carmel). "Batman's Satisfaction" leads up to a fight both Batman and Robin and the Green Hornet and Kato fighting Colonel Gumm and his gang. Once Gumm and his crew are defeated, Batman and Robin fight the Green Hornet and Kato, resulting in a stand-off interrupted by the police. In the episode, Batman, Robin, and the police consider the Green Hornet and Kato criminals, though at the end Batman begins to speculate that Hornet and Kato were only trying to expose Gumm's scheme, but Gordon and Robin are both skeptical.

=== Batman and Robin on The Green Hornet ===
In the December 9, 1966, The Green Hornet episode "The Secret of the Sally Bell" the Batmobile and Batcave are seen on television. In the February 3, 1967, Green Hornet episode "Ace in the Hole", broadcast between the September 1966 and March 1967 Batman appearances (mentioned above), an unidentified episode of Batman is seen on television of Batman and Robin climbing a building. One other appearance of the Green Hornet, Kato, and Batman was broadcast in the autumn of 1966 on a Milton Berle Hollywood Palace television variety show.

== Black Beauty ==
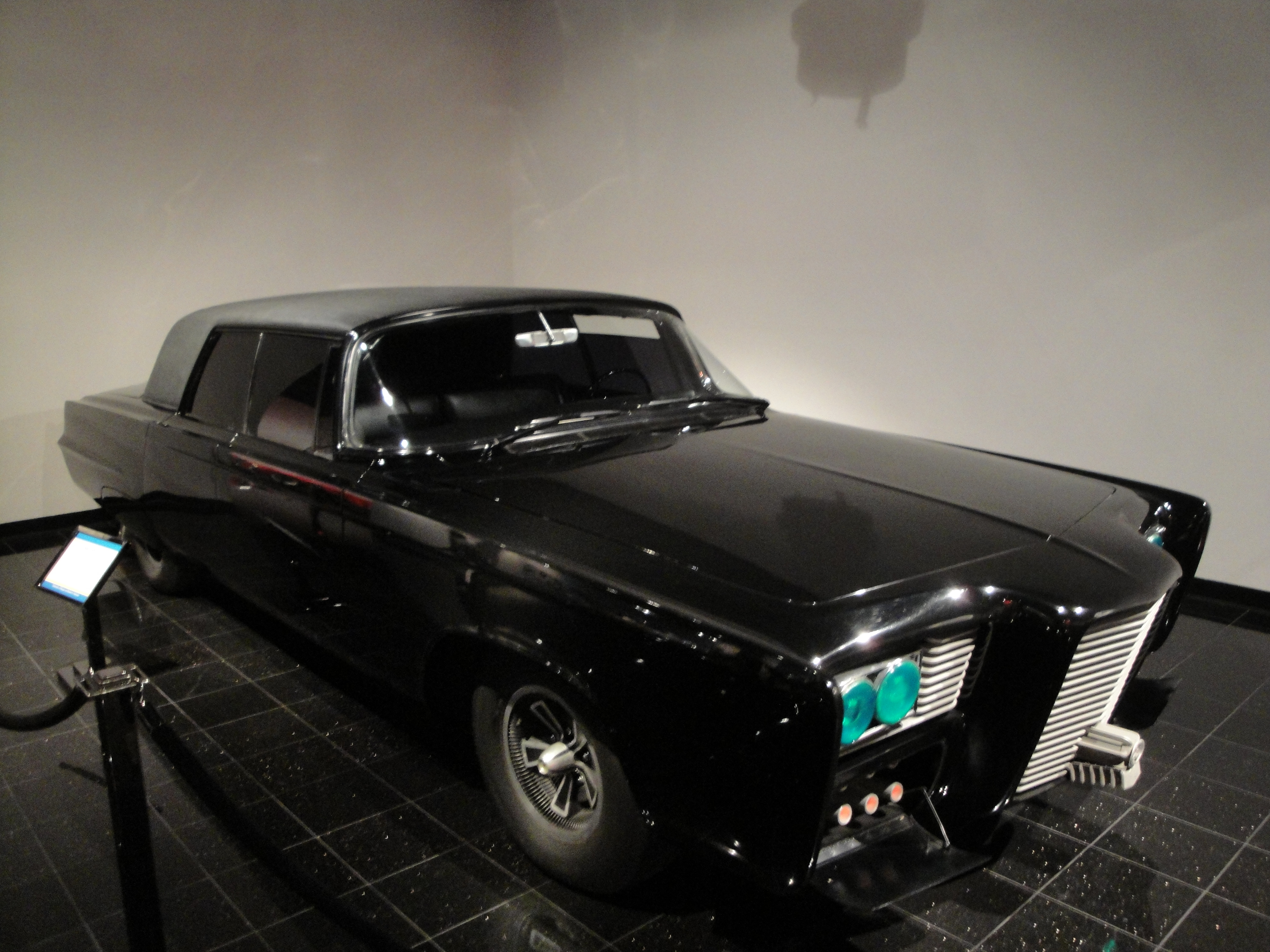
A Black Beauty used in the series

The TV series featured the Green Hornet's car, The Black Beauty, a 1966 Imperial Crown sedan customized by Dean Jeffries at a cost of US$13,000. Two cars were built for the show and both exist today. Black Beauty 1 is located in the Petersen Automotive Museum collection and Black Beauty 2 has been fully restored and is located in a private collection in South Carolina.

=== Storage and deployment ===
The Black Beauty was stored underneath Britt Reid's garage. A set of switches on a secret control panel behind a tool wall would sequentially set the lights to green, attach clamps to the bumpers of Reid's personal car, rotate the floor of the garage – hiding Reid's car (a Chrysler 300 convertible), and bringing up the Black Beauty – finally unclamping the Black Beauty's bumpers. The Black Beauty would then exit the garage through a hidden rear door, and enter the street from behind a billboard advertising the fictitious product Kissin' Candy Mint (with the slogan "How sweet they are") designed to separate down the middle and rejoin.

=== Weaponry, surveillance, and security features ===
The Black Beauty, which carried rear license plate number V194, could fire explosive charges from tubes hidden behind retractable panels below the headlights, which were said to be rockets with explosive warheads; it had concealed-when-not-in-use, drop-down knock-out gas nozzle in the center of the front grille, and the vehicle could launch a small flying video/audio surveillance device (referred to as the scanner) through a small rectangular panel in the middle of the trunk lid. It was a foreshadowing of today's small helicopter-like drones. Working rockets and gas nozzles were incorporated into the trunk lid as well.

== Other appearances ==
=== Dragon: The Bruce Lee Story ===
The 1993 American semi-fictionalized film biography of Bruce Lee depicts Lee (Jason Scott Lee) meeting fictional producer Bill Krieger (Robert Wagner) after a martial arts tournament and being hired to play Kato in The Green Hornet series. The movie shows the fictionalized shooting of the first episode, where the cast and crew are impressed by Lee's martial arts skills. Van Williams plays the director of the episode.

=== The Legend of Bruce Lee ===
The 2008 Chinese biographical television series of Bruce Lee shows Bruce Lee (Danny Chan) as Kato in The Green Hornet in Episode 4, instead of Williams, Britt Reid is played by the fictional Mike (uncredited actor), who has racist attitudes.

=== Batman '66 Meets the Green Hornet ===
Kevin Smith and Ralph Garman are co-writers of a Batman and Green Hornet team-up titled Batman '66 Meets the Green Hornet. The issues were drawn by artist Ty Templeton, with covers by Alex Ross. The six-issue miniseries was co-produced by DC Comics (publishers of Batman) and Dynamite Entertainment (current publishers of the Green Hornet titles). The overall story is a sequel to the above-mentioned Batman/Green Hornet two-part TV crossover episodes, reuniting Hornet and Kato with Batman and Robin, and pitting both teams against the now "General Gumm" and his new criminal cohort, the Joker. The series was published both in physical comic book form and in an extended 12-part digital format, splitting each regular issue's material into two digital issues.

The full series has since been published in a collected volume, both in hardcover and "trade paperback" editions. Garman and Smith have performed dramatized readings of all 6 issues on podcast episodes hosted on Smith's SModcast webpage. The first issue was dramatized in an episode of Smith's Fatman on Batman podcast (episode #66), and the remaining five as episodes of Hollywood Babble-On, co-hosted by Garman and Smith, as special "Hollywood Babble-On Comic-Con Theater" episodes (episodes 175, 180, 184, 188 & 193).

=== Once Upon a Time in Hollywood ===
The 2019 film Once Upon a Time in Hollywood has a scene in which stuntman Cliff Booth (Brad Pitt) has a confrontation with Bruce Lee (played by Mike Moh in full Kato gear) on the set of The Green Hornet. In the scene, an impromptu two-out-of-three martial arts match between Booth and Lee takes place, with both men winning one match, but the fight is broken up before the deciding match can finish.

== Comics ==
The series was adapted into a comic strip by Dan Spiegle, distributed by Gold Key Comics.
