= Spoilers with Kevin Smith =

2010s American film review talk show

- Genre: Talk show
- Created by: Kevin Smith
- Directed by: Zak Knutson; Joey Figueroa
- Presented by: Kevin Smith
- Composer: Danny Sternbaum
- Country of origin: United States
- Original language: English
- No. of seasons: 2
- No. of episodes: 20

Production
- Executive producers: Kevin Smith; Jordan Monsanto; Jason Mewes; Brendan Countee
- Producers: Zak Knutson; Joey Figueroa
- Cinematography: Austin Nordell
- Running time: 20–26 minutes
- Production company: SModcast Pictures

Original release
- Network: Hulu (season 1); The Comedy Network (season 2)
- Release: June 4, 2012 – February 21, 2014

Spoilers with Kevin Smith is a film review television talk show that premiered June 4, 2012 on Hulu. The show, described as an "anti-movie review" show, is hosted by Kevin Smith and produced by Smith's SModcast Pictures. A second season of Spoilers aired on The Comedy Network in Canada. Ten new half-hour episodes were shot in Los Angeles. The first series was filmed at "SModCo Studios", the upper floor of The Jon Lovitz Podcast Theatre at CityWalk in Universal Studios Hollywood. The second series was filmed at Raleigh Studios.

== Format ==
=== The Spoilers' Anti-Review ===
Each week, Smith takes a group of approximately forty people of varying ages (a.k.a. "the Spoilers") to see the release of a new movie. The Spoilers return to the "Jay & Silent Bob-atorium" in the studio to comment on the film, good or bad. This is the "anti-review" part of the show, as no true consensus is reached on the film in question; it is simply the opinions of the group of attendees, with a few comments and a brief summary thrown in by Smith. At the end of the show, Smith suggests that the viewer not necessarily listen to the opinions put forward by the Spoilers and encourages viewers to go and see the movie themselves and form their own opinions, further pressing the "anti-review" angle of the segment.

=== "Criterion Lounge" ===
Smith relates his opinions on a selected Criterion Collection film available on DVD and as part of the Hulu Plus service. This segment was not featured in season 2.

=== Celebrity interview ===
Smith has an informal interview with the week's scheduled guest; the guest sits in a specially constructed throne adorned with griffins whose faces resemble Jason Mewes and Smith as Jay and Silent Bob. Smith stands to the side of the throne and conducts the interview.

=== "Spoilers Cartoon Laboratory" ===
Similar to the "SModCo Cartoon Show" on the SModcast website and Smith's "S.I.T." (SModCo Internet Television) YouTube channel, an animated short is aired using the soundtrack of an episode of Hollywood Babble-On as its voice track. The segment is co-hosted by "Professor Cartoonius", played by Smith's Hollywood Babble-On co-host Ralph Garman (in wig, glasses and fake mustache, doing his impression of Ed Wynn). This segment was not featured in season 2.

=== "Mewes Tube" ===
Jason Mewes shows reviews of movies that have been sent to him on YouTube. This segment started in season 2.

== Episodes ==
=== Season 1 (2012) ===
No.	Title	Original air date	Movie	"Criterion Lounge" offering	Guest	"Hollywood Babble-On" cartoon
1	Girls Just Wanna Have Guns	June 4, 2012	Snow White & the Huntsman	Stranger than Paradise	Carrie Fisher	Cosby Dracula
2	Ridley Me This, Fatman	June 11, 2012	Prometheus	The Blob	Damon Lindelof	Eeyore
3	Cruising to the Oldies	June 18, 2012	Rock of Ages	Man Bites Dog	Robert Rodriguez	Rick Springfield
4	Gore Score and Severed Ears Ago...	June 25, 2012	Abraham Lincoln: Vampire Hunter	My Dinner with Andre	Jason Lee	Dick Van Dyke
5	I Don't Want to Miss a Thong...	July 2, 2012	Magic Mike	Night on Earth	Jon Favreau	Impressions
6	Peter Parker Picked a Peck of Powers	July 9, 2012	The Amazing Spider-Man	The Vanishing	Stan Lee	Canadian
7	Aurora's Dark Night*	July 23, 2012	The Dark Knight Rises	None		
8	Stiller? I Never Even Met Her	July 30, 2012	The Watch	Down by Law	Len Wiseman	Mitch Death
9	You Don't Know Dick... K, Philip?	August 6, 2012	Total Recall	Wings of Desire	Malin Akerman	Clerktopus
10	Bourne Again, Forever and Renner...Damon!	August 13, 2012	The Bourne Legacy	Leningrad Cowboys Go America	Gerard Way	Charlie's Angels

- * NOTE: Due to the events of the 2012 Aurora, Colorado shooting, discussion of the events of that tragedy took precedence over discussion of the movie, and none of the other normal segments were used in this episode.

=== Season 2 (2013) ===
No.	Title	Original air date	Movie	Guest
1	Battle Royale with Cheese	December 6, 2013	The Hunger Games: Catching Fire	Jane Lynch
2	McConaughey, You! Get Offa My Cloud!	December 13, 2013	Dallas Buyers Club	Mark Duplass
3	Yippee-Coens-Yay, Mother Folker	December 20, 2013	Inside Llewyn Davis	Grant Morrison
4	Whatchoo Tolkien About, Willis?	January 10, 2014	The Hobbit: The Desolation of Smaug	Harley Morenstein
5	I Gotta Have More Cowbell	January 17, 2014	Anchorman 2: The Legend Continues	Mindy Kaling
6	Me and Mister, Mister Jonze	January 24, 2014	Her	Gregory Nicotero
7	He Shoots, He Score-Seses!	January 31, 2014	The Wolf of Wall Street	Felicia Day
8	Poppin Woody	February 7, 2014	Saving Mr. Banks	Rosario Dawson
9	Cause This Is Stiller! Stiller Night!	February 14, 2014	The Secret Life of Walter Mitty	Haley Joel Osment
10	Marky Marksman	February 21, 2014	Lone Survivor	Justin Long
