= SModcast Podcast Network =

Podcast network

- Type: Private, limited liability company
- Industry: Podcasting
- Founded: January 2010
- Founders: Kevin Smith
- Headquarters: Los Angeles, California, U.S.
- Area served: Worldwide
- Parent: SModCo
- Website: smodcast.com

SModcast Podcast Network is a podcast network owned by Kevin Smith. The network was started in January 2010 to host the podcast SModcast alongside the popular Tell 'Em Steve-Dave! and Highlands: A Peephole History.

== Current podcasts ==
- SModcast, is a podcast featuring filmmaker Kevin Smith. The show was initially co-hosted with Smith's long-time producing partner Scott Mosier, although over the years, Mosier's appearances have been sporadic with a series of guest hosts taking his place. New episodes were initially released each Sunday night or Monday morning, with more recent episodes being released on a much more infrequent schedule. The episodes are generally one hour in length and feature Smith and Mosier, or a guest co-host, discussing current events and other non-sequitur topics.
- Hollywood Babble-On, is hosted by Kevin Smith and Ralph Garman. The show involves the two hosts discussing film and entertainment news. The podcast was originally recorded at SModcastle, then at The Jon Lovitz Podcast Theatre, with it now being recorded at The Hollywood Improv on Saturday nights, with some episodes recorded at tour locations.
- Fatman Beyond, is hosted by Kevin Smith and Marc Bernardin. The show is dedicated to the Batman mythos. In each episode, Kevin interviews someone involved with one of the many versions of Batman (comics, TV, animation, movie, etc.). The original title of the show was Fatman on Batman.
- NetHeads, is hosted by Will Wilkins and Trent Hunsaker. The show is broadcast live every Sunday. It is released as a podcast later in the week of recording.
- Nooner, is hosted by Marty Yu, Bill Watterson, Gisele Nett, Cassandra Cardenes and John Pirruccello. The show originally ran from July to December 2011, hosted by Dan Etheridge and Marty Yu, before moving timeslots to become the Tuesday edition of The SModCo SMorning Show. In August 2015 the show reverted to the name Nooner. This show airs live every Tuesday at 9am Pacific and 12pm Eastern and is available later in the week as a podcast.
- Last Week On Earth, is hosted by comedian Ben Gleib.

== Defunct or former podcasts ==
- Tell 'Em Steve-Dave!, is hosted by Bryan Johnson, Walt Flanagan and Brian Quinn. The title refers to the characters Johnson and Flanagan played in many Kevin Smith films. Johnson played Steve-Dave and Flanagan played Fanboy who yelled "Tell 'em, Steve-Dave!" in Mallrats. This was the first podcast to join the network after SModcast. After several years, the trio left the network and began self-releasing episodes.
- Jay & Silent Bob Get Old, is hosted by Kevin Smith and Jason Mewes. It features the two hosts talking about various experiences that they've had together during their twenty-plus year friendship. The first episodes recounted Jason Mewes' drug-related past and about his recent break from sobriety in 2010. Current episodes also include stories of Mewes' past sexual experiences, Smith's responses to Twitter messages while stoned and the game "Let Us Fuck", where via "air sex" Mewes—assisted by audience members—creates new sexual positions suggested by Smith. Smith often suggests the podcast is a weekly "intervention" and a way to keep Mewes sober. The podcast was originally recorded at SModcastle, then at The Jon Lovitz Podcast Theatre on Friday nights, with some episodes recorded at tour locations.
- Waking From The American Dream, is hosted by Kelly Carlin, daughter of the late comedian George Carlin. During this podcast, Kelly interviews a wide variety of fellow comedians and thinkers and discusses their lives, experiences, and thoughts. This show airs live every Thursday at 5pm PST or 8pm EST.
- FEaB (Four Eyes and Beard), is co-hosted by comic and podcaster Matt Mira (Four Eyes) and Scott Mosier (Beard) features an hour-long conversation on any number of topics. It was a co-production with Nerdist Industries.
- Last Week On Earth, is hosted by Ben Gleib.
- I Sell Comics!, is hosted by Ming Chen and Mike Zapcic in which they discuss comic books.
- Film School Fridays, hosted by Kevin Smith where he discusses film making.
- Edumacation with Kev and Andy, is hosted by Kevin Smith and Andy McElfresh.
- The Toronto, Ontario Mo & Glo(ria) Show, was a podcast hosted by Malcolm Ingram and his mother, Gloria Ingram. The podcast was released on Tuesdays. The podcast ended after 17 episodes when Malcolm moved to Los Angeles and created the new show 'Blow Hard'. There have been new episodes when Malcolm went to Canada to visit his mother posted on both the 'Mo & Glo' and 'Blow Hard' pages before just being posted under the 'Blow Hard' completely.
- Get Up On This, is hosted by Jensen Karp and Matthew Robinson in which they and a guest discuss things they think will soon become popular. The podcast moved to Wolfpop a pop culture spin-off of the Earwolf podcast network in 2014.
- Live From SModcastle, were shows recorded at SModcastle podcast studios that are not shows on the SModcast Network, such as Crimson Mystical Mages. The SModcastle podcast studio has since closed (not to be confused with Smodcastle Cinemas) and a new show under this banner has not been posted since 2010.
- Malcolm Ingram: Blow Hard, was hosted by Malcolm Ingram. Malcolm chose to use strings of different guest hosts; ranging from Kevin Smith, Jason Mewes, his mother Gloria, writer and actor Marja Lewis Ryan and gay pornographic actor Brent Corrigan. Ingram discontinued the podcast after 90 episodes.
- Mohr Stories, is hosted by Jay Mohr. This podcast was part of SModcast for nearly a year before continuing independent of the network in May 2012.
- Jay & Silent Bob Get Jobs, was hosted by Kevin Smith and Jason Mewes.
- SModco SMidnight Show, A live call-in internet radio show that was hosted live on SModcast Internet Radio hosted by Matt Cohen. He and his co-host Matt Cruz discussed upcoming DVD releases, talk about celebrity women they'd been crushing on in a segment titled "Famous Bitches," played games with callers, and discussed various news topics from around the world. In April 2012, Cohen said on his Twitter feed that "SMidnight is dead," inferring that the show would no longer be recorded. The show is archived on the SModcast website.
- SModCo SMorning Show, was hosted by Ming Chen and Michael Zapcic on Friday and is a morning radio show featuring guests and discussion of the news of the day.
- SMoviola, was a show hosted by Kevin Smith in which he interviews the cast and crew of some of his favourite movies. All SMovila podcasts were moved to the SMovieMakers page and renumbered as SMovieMakers shows.
- Mewescast, was hosted by Jason Mewes. The podcast began in 2009 with only three episodes that aired on Quick Stop Entertainment, but was revived in 2011 on the SModcast network.
- Big Bald Broadcast, is hosted by Kyle Hebert and Otherworld Steve
- Gettin' Sketchy, is hosted by Steve Stark and Josh Stifler
- Red State of the Union Q&A's, was hosted by Kevin Smith. It is a mini-series about the making of Red State which involves actors and crewmembers from the film and Smith showing the audience scenes from the film.
- The ABC's of SNL, was hosted by Kevin Smith in which he interviews Jon Lovitz about his life and how he became involved in Saturday Night Live. The podcast is recorded at The Jon Lovitz Podcast Theatre.
- Puck Nuts, was hosted by Bryan Johnson, Walt Flanagan, Ming Chen and Sunday Jeff. The Show covers the New Jersey Devils and the National Hockey League.
- SMarriage at SModcastle, was hosted by Kevin Smith, where as an ordained minister of the Universal Life Church, he marries couples of any sexual persuasion.
- Starfucking With Kevin Smith, was a one off intimate interview, The show was a double feature with couple Neil Gaiman and Amanda Palmer on November 23, 2010, which included a mini concert from Palmer, a short narrative by Gaiman, and an impromptu reading of a story from Gaiman's American Gods featuring all three players.
- Plus One Per Diem, was hosted by Kevin Smith and Jennifer Schwalbach Smith. This was a podcast of their SModcast Internet Radio (S.I.R.) show.
- Tom Green Live From the SModcastle, was a weekly podcast starring Tom Green and celebrity guests, performed live in front of an audience at the SModCastle.
- Having Sex, with Katie Morgan, was hosted by former pornstar Katie Morgan. (Most of the first 100 episodes were co-hosted with Cassie Young, but after a falling out, she ceased to be co-host, and all the episodes she co-hosted were removed from the SModcast Network. Since episode 107, she co-hosted most of the succeeding episodes with Rebecca Love.) She answered sex related questions from the audience and tells stories. This was a podcast of their SModcast Internet Radio (S.I.R.) show.
- Team Jack
- Highlands: A Peephole History, is hosted by Kevin Smith with rotating co-hosts such as: Bryan Johnson, Walt Flanagan, Kevin's mother Grace, brother Donald and sister Virginia. Jason Mewes has appeared on several episodes and is the co-host of Highlands 3D, the live show, hosted at SModcastle. It originally began as a subsidiary to SModcast show but has since been given its own page on the website for the SModcast Network. It features the hosts talking about their youth growing up in Highlands, New Jersey.
- Tha Breaks – hosted by Jammaster James Franco Jr, Nestorious Nestor Rodriguez, Eric Smoothe Schwartz, Joanne Kitty Kat Scorcia, Jacob Bagel Goldstein. Created by Jammaster after being given a "break" by Kevin Smith live on the air during the SMorning Show in 2011. After a slew of Tweets to Kevin from followers asking if Jammaster James would ever get a show, Kevin stopped the show to offer James the opportunity of creating his own show and bringing it to the network. Shortly thereafter, James decided that since Kevin gave him a "break", he would pay it forward and created "Tha Breaks" a show that would primarily focus on helping "break" new talent in many areas of entertainment. The show went on hiatus in February 2014.
- SMinterview, is hosted by Kevin Smith in which he interviews an individual.
- SMovieMakers, is hosted by Kevin Smith. The original concept involved a screening of a film, followed by a Q&A between Smith and the film's director, in front of an audience. The show is now comparable to SMinterview, but focusing on people within the film world (actors, producers, etc. as well as directors) – there is no screening before the movie and the podcast is now an intimate two-person chat between Smith and the interviewee, without an audience.
- Plus One, is hosted by Kevin Smith and Jennifer Schwalbach Smith.
- The Secret Stash, was hosted by Kevin Smith, Walt Flanagan, Bryan Johnson, Ming Chen and Mike Zapcic. This was the official companion podcast to the TV series Comic Book Men. The podcast came out every Sunday after the broadcast of each new episode on AMC.
- Talk Salad and Scrambled Eggs (Frasier Reconsidered), is hosted by Kevin Smith and Matt Mira in which they review every episode of the sitcom Frasier.
- Bagged & Boarded, Started in 2008, by Matt Cohen and his friend and then co-worker at Angry Films, Jesse Rivers and hosted initially on Kevin Smith's Quick Stop Entertainment. In 2010, Jesse moved back to his home in Alabama, and shortly after Brendan Creecy, already a regular fixture on the show with a segment entitled "The Brendoman Minute", took over co-hosting duties. In late 2010, the show moved to the SModcast Network. As of Episode 92, Matt has been hosting the show by himself, either with a special celebrity guest co-host or a member of what is referred to as "The Bagged & Boarded: Brave and the Bold", which consists of a mix of Matt's personal friends and past interview subjects from Bagged & Boarded itself. In 2011, former adult performer and video game industry professional Misti Dawn became the new co-host.
- Soundbite Nation

== SModcastle ==
After the first SMod tour, Smith mused in a tweet about having a theater solely for the purpose of recording his SModcast Network shows. Seeing this, Bagged & Boarded's Matt Cohen searched for and found a small black box theatre that would become SModcastle, the "World's First Podcast Theater". SModcastle was located at 6468 Santa Monica Blvd in Los Angeles and had its opening night on July 25, 2010. SModcastle was used for live recordings of SModcast, Blow Hard and Jay & Silent Bob Get Old, "Bagged & Boarded", and more. It was also used for NHL video game tournaments, showing movies and weddings performed by Smith who is an ordained minister.

However, SModcastle held only 50 seats and two shows recorded there were popular enough to regularly sell out, which led Smith to search for a larger Venue to record them in and found The Jon Lovitz Comedy Club (later called The Jon Lovitz Comedy Club & Podcast Theatre). Smith successfully moved both the live recordings of Hollywood Babble-On and Jay & Silent Bob Get Old to the new venue. Several months after this, Smith announced the SModcastle will be shutting down and will re-open under the name of SModcastle Lounge in the top floor of The Jon Lovitz Comedy Club & Podcast Theatre but the SModcastle Lounge never came to be. The final recording night in SModcastle took place on June 29, 2011. Of all the shows that featured at SModcastle, only Hollywood Babble-On and Jay & Silent Bob Get Old continued regularly at The Jon Lovitz Comedy Club & Podcast Theatre until April 2013.

== SModco Cartoon Show ==
A fan of SModcast, Steve Stark, made two cartoons that played out stories which were told on SModcast and uploaded them to YouTube. Kevin Smith saw them and commissioned him to make more.

The first season of SModimations was later compiled together, complete with new material bridging the episodes, and released on DVD through Shout! Factory in late 2011. It is being sold both individually, and as part of two special boxed sets, the first of which includes the Kevin Smith: Too Fat for 40 DVD and an exclusive DVD featuring a fully filmed episode of Hollywood Babble-On. The second set features all 3 DVDs and a Blu-ray, DVD Combo copy of Too Fat For 40 (with Disc 1 in Blu-ray format and Disc 2 in DVD format).

In 2012, Smith held a contest for animators to create an animation of Batman encountering Darth Vader. The three winners were chosen to contribute to SModimations, now titled SModco Cartoon Show, as it became a weekly show on YouTube. Animators, including Stark, rotate every week.

In 2013 more cartoons were released through iTunes under the name Kevin Smith's Cartoon Lagoon with the first installment released on April 18. The name was later changed to SModimations Volume 2: Sub-Standard Kevin Smith Cartoons after a copyright claim on cartoon lagoon. SModimations Volume 3: Jay & Silent Bob vs. Sant-Al Claus was released on November 27, 2013.

== SModcast Pictures ==
Kevin Smith announced at the 2011 Sundance Film Festival announced he would release his latest movie Red State himself under his own distribution company SModcast Pictures by touring the film instead of having a traditional release. After the success of the Red State tour, SModcast Pictures announced a partnership with Phase 4 Films to distribute up to twelve films a year in the US and Canada, with up to four of those films getting the roadshow treatment used for Red State. The first film to be picked was Bindlestiffs

SModcast Pictures produces the unscripted television series Comic Book Men, as well as the Hulu exclusive series Spoilers.

== SModcast Internet Radio (S.I.R.) ==
On February 23, 2011, Kevin Smith revealed on G4tv's Attack of the Show that on May 9, 2011, he would be launching SModcast Internet Radio (S.I.R.) which would stream live content and feature live shows including SMorning with Jen & Kev, later renamed Plus One Per Diem, a morning radio show featuring Smith and wife Jennifer Schwalbach and the afternoon show Jay & Silent Bob Get Jobs featuring Smith and fellow podcaster, co-star, and friend Jason Mewes.

S.I.R. is available through Stitcher Radio and the SModcast website. Shows are released as podcasts on the same day.

== SModCo Internet Television (S.I.T.) ==
In April 2012, Kevin Smith announced that SModCo Internet Television (S.I.T.), which is SModCo's venture into internet television, would launch on May 9, 2012. The channel is on YouTube.

== The Wayne Foundation ==
The official charity of SModCo is The Wayne Foundation, which is committed to spreading awareness of CSEC (Commercial Sexual Exploitation of Children) and building a rehabilitation facility for victims of DMST (Domestic Minor Sexual Trafficking).

=== Smodcastle Cinemas ===
In 2022, Smith became the co-owner of the downtown Atlantic Highlands movie theater formerly known as the Atlantic Moviehouse, which was re-named Smodcastle Cinemas and made home to the Smodcastle Film Festival.
