= Last Gang =

Last Gang may refer to:

- Last Gang Records
- The Last Gang (band)
