= SModcast =

Comedy podcast featuring Kevin Smith

- Genre: Comedy
- Language: English

Cast and voices
- Hosted by: Kevin Smith; Scott Mosier

Production
- Production: Ken Plume
- Length: 60 minutes

Technical specifications
- Audio format: MP3

Publication
- No. of episodes: 448
- Original release: February 5, 2007
- Provider: SModcast Podcast Network
- Updates: Sundays

Related
- Adaptations: Tusk (2014 film)

SModcast is a podcast featuring filmmaker Kevin Smith. The show was initially co-hosted with Smith's long-time producing partner Scott Mosier, although over the years, Mosier's appearances have been sporadic with a series of guest hosts taking his place. New episodes were initially released each Sunday night/Monday morning, with more recent episodes being released on a much more infrequent schedule. The episodes are generally one hour in length and feature Smith and Mosier, or a guest co-host, discussing current events and other non-sequitur topics.

The name was derived from taking the first letters of "Smith" and "Mosier" and replacing the "P" in podcast. The podcast was originally distributed through Smith's entertainment website Quick Stop Entertainment. New episodes were made available for download each Sunday night or Monday morning, and are then released through the RSS feed the following Friday in order to ease bandwidth strains on the Quickstop Entertainment. On January 1, 2010, the host site was sold, the SModcasts were removed and a dedicated site was started. In addition, the one-week delay for iTunes subscribers was dropped starting with SModcast 101.

In September 2009, a book of Smith's favorite SModcasts called Shootin' the Sh*t with Kevin Smith was released.

== SMoffee ==
In partnership with the Just Coffee Cooperative, SModcast launched its official coffee called SMoffee. This coffee is a blend of Mexican, Colombian and Ethiopian coffees with one dollar of every purchase going to The Wayne foundation.

== SMeaker ==
For Kevin Smith's second collaboration with Etnies they created the first sneakers based on a podcast, SMeaker. They were launched at the 2011 San Diego Comic-Con.

== Yoga Hosers ==
The title of the film Yoga Hosers came from a remark Scott Mosier made during an early 2014 segment of SModcast. Smith brought up fanciful quotes attributed to Simon Metke, an Edmonton yoga instructor whose home had recently been raided by the Royal Canadian Mounted Police (RCMP), who recovered an artwork stolen from the Montreal Museum of Fine Arts in 2011 there. Mosier imagined the RCMP saying "Open up, yoga hoser!" as they knocked on the door. After it became a catchphrase among the podcast's listeners, Smith announced it would be the title of his next film. The character of Yogi Bayer in the film is also based on descriptions of Metke in the media.

== Awards and recognition ==
In 2007, it was named one of the best new podcasts by iTunes. In 2010, several of the podcasts were placed upon iTunes' Best Podcasts of 2010 list which included: Jay & Silent Bob Get Old, Tell 'Em Steve-Dave!, Hollywood Babble-On, and Highlands: A Peephole History.

== See also ==
- Smodcastle Cinemas
