= Jon Lovitz =

American comedian and actor (born 1957)

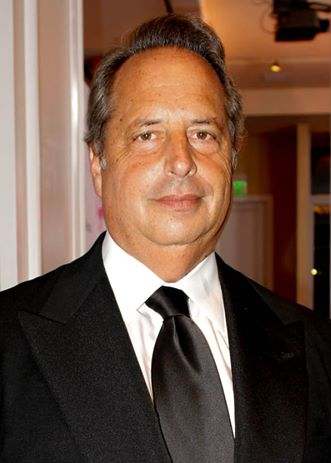
- Jon Lovitz, 2014
- Born: Jonathan Michael Lovitz; July 21, 1957 (age 69); Los Angeles, California, United States
- Education: University of California, Irvine (BA)
- Occupations: Comedian; actor
- Years active: 1984–present

Jonathan Michael Lovitz (/ˈlʌvɪts/ LUV-its; born July 21, 1957) is an American comedian and actor. He is best known for his tenure as a cast member on the NBC sketch comedy series Saturday Night Live from 1985 to 1990, for which he was nominated for two Primetime Emmy Awards.

Besides SNL, he starred as Jay Sherman on the adult animation series The Critic (1994–1995), has played various roles on The Simpsons (1991–) and has acted in numerous television shows such as Seinfeld, Friends and NewsRadio. From 2012 to 2015, he starred in the sitcom Mr. Box Office. Beginning in 2017, he was a regular comedian on the game show Funny You Should Ask.

Lovitz played a baseball scout in the film A League of Their Own (1992) and acted in other films such as Three Amigos (1986), Big (1988), Mom and Dad Save the World (1992), Coneheads (1993), Happiness (1998), Small Time Crooks (2000), Rat Race (2001), The Producers (2005) and Bula Quo! (2013). He also voiced roles in The Brave Little Toaster (1987), Hotel Transylvania (2012) and Hotel Transylvania 2 (2015). He played Alan Dershowitz on Saturday Night Live and George Santos on The Tonight Show Starring Jimmy Fallon.

== Early life and education ==
Lovitz was born on July 21, 1957, in the Tarzana neighborhood of Los Angeles, to Harold and Barbara Lovitz. His family is Jewish and emigrated from Romania, Hungary and Russia. His paternal grandfather Feivel Ianculovici left Romania around 1914 and anglicized his name to Phillip Lovitz after arriving in the United States.

Lovitz graduated from the Harvard-Westlake School in 1975. He then studied drama at UC Irvine under Robert Cohen, graduating with a bachelor's degree in 1979. Afterward, he studied acting with Tony Barr at Tony Barr's Film Actors Workshop. He became a member of The Groundlings comedy troupe, where he performed alongside Lisa Kudrow, and where he befriended his future SNL castmate Phil Hartman.

Lovitz's childhood best friend was Lisa's brother David Kudrow. While in college, Lovitz went on a backpacking trip across Europe and Israel with him in 1978.

== Career ==
=== 1985–1992: Saturday Night Live ===
Lovitz's first stint as a regular in a situation comedy was that of Mole, an investigator for a New York City district attorney's office, in the short-lived 1985–86 series Foley Square, starring Margaret Colin. Lovitz was a cast member of Saturday Night Live from 1985 to 1990. He later said in an interview for the book Live From New York: An Uncensored History of Saturday Night Live that his time on SNL was the most memorable in his career. He went from having no money to being offered a $500,000 film contract. He was nominated for an Emmy Award his first two years on Saturday Night Live. One of his most notable SNL characters was "Tommy Flanagan, The Pathological Liar" who used an old Humphrey Bogart line "Yeah! That's the ticket!" as a catchphrase to punctuate painfully elaborated implausible lies. His other recurring characters and impersonations included Annoying Man, Master Thespian, Tonto, Mephistopheles, David Crosby, Harvey Fierstein, and Michael Dukakis. In a 1986 SNL episode, he portrayed a Trekkie, who was scripted to hang his head when asked by William Shatner if he had ever kissed a girl.

Hanukkah Harry, one of Lovitz's most memorable roles, cast him in 1989 as a Jewish contemporary of Santa Claus who lives on Mount Sinai and travels the globe with a cart flown by three donkeys to give bland gifts to Jewish boys and girls. He is asked to fill in when Santa falls ill on Christmas Eve.

On February 15, 2015, on the Saturday Night Live 40th Anniversary Special, he was named by Steve Martin as one of the many SNL cast members who had died over the years, with the camera cutting to show Lovitz's reaction. Later, his image was seen in a montage of deceased SNL members, with the camera once again cutting to his now "outraged" reaction.

=== 1993–2008: Post-SNL and The Critic ===
From 1998 to 1999, he was cast to replace Phil Hartman on NewsRadio upon the latter's death. Lovitz has lent his voice to several cartoons and films. In The Critic, he played the title character Jay Sherman (using his regular speaking voice). He has made several appearances on The Simpsons—as Marge's prom date Artie Ziff in "The Way We Was", the art teacher in "Brush with Greatness", theater director Llewellyn Sinclair and his sister who owned a daycare center in "A Streetcar Named Marge", and numerous other appearances, including the character of Jay Sherman in the episode "A Star Is Burns", a crossover with The Critic. He was also the voice of Radio in the Hyperion-produced, Disney-distributed animated film The Brave Little Toaster, and that of T.R. Chula the tarantula in Amblimation's An American Tail: Fievel Goes West.

In the 1990s, Lovitz voiced the Red M&M in commercials for M&M's. Between 1999 and 2000 Lovitz appeared in a $33 million advertising campaign that featured a series of television commercials promoting the Yellow Pages. The comic premise was to present Lovitz as the Yellow Pages' author. One of them featured Lovitz saying, "The hardest thing to do is to come up with a simple idea that is also great. And I just thought, 'Oh, the alphabet!'"

Lovitz performed a duet with Robbie Williams on Williams' album Swing When You're Winning (2001), in the song "Well, Did You Evah!". On October 10, 2001, Lovitz sang the song at the Royal Albert Hall. He also performed on the TV series Two and a Half Men singing "Save the Orphans" and beating Charlie (Charlie Sheen) out of the award for best jingle writer. He has appeared on Broadway at the Music Box Theatre in Neil Simon's play The Dinner Party, taking over the lead role from Henry Winkler. He sang at Carnegie Hall three times (including Great Performances' Ira Gershwin at 100: A Celebration at Carnegie Hall) and sang the national anthem at Dodger Stadium and the U.S. Open.

Lovitz began his stand-up career in 2003 at the Laugh Factory in Los Angeles. In 2006, he became the spokesman in an advertising campaign for the Subway restaurant chain.

=== 2009–present: Stand-up ===
In 2009, The Jon Lovitz Comedy Club location at Universal CityWalk near Universal Studios Hollywood opened. A comic short film starring Ken Davitian and featuring Lovitz was filmed there, directed by Brent Roske and written by Aaron Davitian. The Jon Lovitz Comedy Club in Universal Studios Hollywood was home to the first MMA Roasted standup comedy show in 2009. On May 29, 2011, the name was changed to the Jon Lovitz Comedy Club & Podcast Theatre. A premiere event called Podammit was held, in which Kevin Smith hosted a variety of six podcasts, including Plus One 3D with his wife, Jennifer Schwalbach; Hollywood Babble-On with Ralph Garman; and Jay & Silent Bob Get Old with Jason Mewes; as well as The ABCs of SNL with Lovitz himself, a six-episode This Is Your Life-style biographical interview about Lovitz's life and career. The Club periodically hosted other podcasts such as Rob Paulsen's Talkin' Toons (which subsequently left in October 2013). The Jon Lovitz Comedy Club & Podcast Theater closed on November 5, 2014.

In 2020, Lovitz starred in commercials for Playology, a brand of toys for aging dogs. They featured him with disparaging puppies, asking for senior dogs to get their due. That same year he portrayed lawyer Alan Dershowitz on season 45 of Saturday Night Live with Adam Driver as the host playing Jeffrey Epstein. Also that year, he was hired by Ninjio to voice characters in their animated employee training videos on cybersecurity. In 2023, he portrayed U.S. Congressman George Santos on The Tonight Show with Jimmy Fallon.

== Personal life ==
Lovitz resides in Beverly Hills, California. He is friends with Adam Sandler. He was also friends with Penny Marshall, Phil Hartman, and Andrew Dice Clay. He has described Hartman as "the big brother I always wanted".

=== Charity ===
Lovitz was a contestant on The New Celebrity Apprentice (also known as Celebrity Apprentice 8), playing for the charity St. Jude Children's Research Hospital. He was the sixth contestant fired, finishing in 11th place and raising $50,000 for his charity. He also appeared on an episode of Celebrity Weakest Link to compete for charity on November 17, 2025.

=== Feud with Andy Dick ===
Lovitz was involved in an intense feud with former NewsRadio costar Andy Dick concerning the death of their mutual friend Phil Hartman. According to Lovitz, Dick gave Hartman's wife Brynn cocaine at a Christmas party at Hartman's house in 1997. Brynn, a recovering addict, began using drugs again, culminating in her killing Hartman and herself on May 28, 1998. When Lovitz joined the cast of NewsRadio as Hartman's replacement, he and Dick got into a heated argument in which Lovitz reportedly shouted "I wouldn't be here if you hadn't given Brynn coke in the first place." Lovitz later apologized to Dick for the remark.

In early 2007, Dick approached Lovitz at a restaurant and said "I put the Phil Hartman hex on you—you're the next to die." On July 10, 2007, Lovitz got into a physical altercation with Dick at the Laugh Factory in Los Angeles. Lovitz demanded an apology from Dick, who refused and accused Lovitz of blaming him for Hartman's death. Lovitz then smashed Dick's head into the bar.

=== Political beliefs ===
Politically, Lovitz was a supporter of the Democratic Party. However, he was an outspoken critic of former president Barack Obama. He called Obama a "fucking asshole" and criticized him for claiming the rich did not pay their share of taxes. Lovitz said: "He had nothing … and the guy ends up being at Harvard. He's the president of the United States. And now he's like, 'Fuck me and everyone who made it like me'."

In June 2021, Lovitz criticized cancel culture and compared it to McCarthyism. He opined that it makes comedians' jobs increasingly difficult, saying, "If you don't have the ability to laugh at yourself, don't go to a comedy club," and "If you're watching TV and you don't like the show, change the channel. It's very simple." In 2024, he was a supporter of president Donald Trump and praised his efforts to support Israel after the October 7 attacks. He has regularly criticized antisemitism, including exposing children who bullied his friend's daughter, and anti-Zionism, such as pro-Palestinian protestors at Columbia University.

== Filmography ==
=== Film ===
Film performances
Year	Title	Role	Notes
1986	Hamburger: The Motion Picture	Security guard	
1986	Last Resort	Bartender	
1986	Jumpin' Jack Flash	Doug	
1986	Ratboy	Party guest	
1986	Three Amigos	Morty	
1987	The Brave Little Toaster	Radio	Voice
1988	Big	Scotty Brennen	
1988	My Stepmother Is an Alien	Ron Mills	
1990	Mr. Destiny	Clip Metzler	
1991	An American Tail: Fievel Goes West	T.R. Chula	Voice
1992	A League of Their Own	Ernie Capadino	
1992	Mom and Dad Save the World	Emperor Tod Spengo	
1992	The Buzz	Unknown	
1993	Loaded Weapon 1	Becker	
1993	Coneheads	Dr. Rudolph	Uncredited
1994	City Slickers II: The Legend of Curly's Gold	Glen Robbins	
1994	North	Arthur Belt	
1994	Trapped in Paradise	Dave Firpo	
1996	For Goodness Sake II	Unknown	
1996	The Great White Hype	Sol	
1996	Matilda	Mickey	Uncredited
1996	High School High	Richard Clark	
1997	I Am Your Child	Himself	
1998	The Wedding Singer	Jimmie Moore	Uncredited
1998	Happiness	Andy Kornbluth	
1999	Lost & Found	Uncle Harry	
2000	Small Time Crooks	Benny	
2000	Little Nicky	Peeper	
2000	Sand	Kirby	
2001	3000 Miles to Graceland	Jay Peterson	
2001	Cats & Dogs	Calico	Voice
2001	Rat Race	Randall "Randy" Pear	
2001	Good Advice	Barry Sherman	
2002	Eight Crazy Nights	Tom Baltezor	Voice
2003	Dickie Roberts: Former Child Star	Sidney Wernick	
2004	The Stepford Wives	Dave Markowitz	
2005	Bailey's Billion$	Bailey	Voice
2005	Pancho's Pizza	Unknown	Short film
2005	The Producers	Mr. Marks	
2006	The Benchwarmers	Mel	
2006	Southland Tales	Bart Bookman	
2006	Farce of the Penguins	"My eyes are up here" Penguin	Voice; Direct-to-DVD release
2007	I Could Never Be Your Woman	Rob	Direct-to-DVD release
2010	Casino Jack	Adam Kidan	
2012	Jewtopia	Dennis Lipschitz	
2012	Hotel Transylvania	Quasimodo	Voice
2012	A Mouse Tale	Mouse King	Voice
2013	Jungle Master	Mulla	Voice
2013	Jay & Silent Bob's Super Groovy Cartoon Movie!	The Mad Scientist	Voice
2013	Bula Quo!	Wilson	
2013	Grown Ups 2	Squats Fitness Janitor	
2013	Almost Sharkproof	Max	
2014	Birds of Paradise	Skeeter	Voice
2014	Coffee Shop	Frank Miller	
2015	Hotel Transylvania 2	The Phantom of the Opera	Voice cameo
2015	The Ridiculous 6	Ezekiel Grant	
2015	Bark Ranger	Ranger	Voice
2016	Mother's Day	Wally Burn	
2017	Sandy Wexler	Testimonial	
2017	Killing Hasselhoff	Barry	
2017	Chasing the Blues	Lincoln Groome	
2018	Bachelor Lions	Alfred Brownberry	
2018	Paws P.I.	Jackson	Voice
2019	Benchwarmers 2: Breaking Balls	Mel Carmichael	
2019	Hooked	Mr. Campbell	
2020	Influence	Gregg Anderson	
2020	Agent Toby Barks	Toby	Voice
2020	The Swing of Things	Jon Johnston	
2021	Extinct	Conch	Voice
2021	Tales of a Fifth Grade Robin Hood	John Prince	
2021	Love on the Rock	Alex Wingrave	
2021	Lacy's Christmas Do-Over	Santa's Elf	Voice
2021	Ace & the Christmas Miracle	Ace	Voice
2024	Lost & Found in Cleveland	Mayor of Cleveland	
2025	Happy Gilmore 2	Dapper Man	
2026	Don't Say Good Luck	Lenny	

=== Television ===
Year	Title	Role	Notes
1984	The Paper Chase	Levitz	Episode: "Billy Pierce"
1985–1986	Foley Square	Mole	Regular cast member
1985–1992	Saturday Night Live	Various characters	Main cast (92 episodes)
1991	Tales from the Crypt	Barry Blye	Episode: "Top Billing"
1991	Married... with Children	Jeff Littlehead	Episode: "Kelly Does Hollywood: Part 2"
1991–present	The Simpsons	Artie Ziff, Jay Sherman, Aristotle Amadopolis, Prof. Lombardo, Various characters	Voice (22 episodes)
1992, 1994	The Larry Sanders Show	Himself	(2 episodes)
1993	A League of Their Own	Ernie Capadino	Episode: "Dottie's Back"
1994–1995	The Critic	Jay Sherman	Voice, Main role (23 episodes)
1995	Seinfeld	Gary Fogel	Episode: "The Scofflaw"
1995, 2003	Friends	Steve	(2 episodes)
1997	The Naked Truth	Acer Predburn	Episode: "The Scoop"
1997–1999	NewsRadio	Ulysses S. Grant, Mike Johnson, Max Lewis	Main cast member in fifth season (2 episodes)
1997	Saturday Night Live	Host	Episode: "Jon Lovitz/Jane's Addiction"
2000	Bette	Himself	Episode: "Polterguest"
2000–2001	The Critic (webisodes)	Jay Sherman	Voice
2002	Son of the Beach	Father of B.J.'s Baby	Episode: "Bad News, Mr. Johnson"
2003	Just Shoot Me!	Roland Devereaux	Episode: "A Simple Kiss of Fate"
2004–2005	Las Vegas	Fred Puterbaugh	(3 episodes)
2006	Two and a Half Men	Archie Baldwin	Episode: "The Unfortunate Little Schnauzer"
2008	Comedy Central Roast of Bob Saget	Himself	Television special
2010	WWE Raw	Himself	Guest host
2011	Comedy Central Roast of Charlie Sheen	Himself	Television special
2011	Saturday Night Live	Himself (Cameo)	Episode: "Dana Carvey/Linkin Park"
2011–2012	Hot in Cleveland	Homeless Man & Artie	(4 episodes)
2012–2015	Mr. Box Office	Bobby Gold	Main cast member
2013–2014	New Girl	Rabbi Feiglin	(2 episodes)
2014	Sing Your Face Off	Himself	Contestant
2015	Randy Cunningham: 9th Grade Ninja	Queen Gabnidine	Voice, Episode: "To Smell and Back"
2015	Hawaii Five-O	Barry Burns	(2 episodes)
2016–2018	Animals.	Himself & Old Ben	Voice (3 episodes)
2016, 2018	The $100,000 Pyramid	Himself (Celebrity Guest)	(2 episodes)
2017	The New Celebrity Apprentice	Himself (Contestant)	11th place
2017	Justice League Action	Sid Sharp	Voice, Episode: "Superman's Pal, Sid Sharp"
2017–2024	Funny You Should Ask	Himself (Celebrity Comic)	(467 episodes)
2018	Insatiable	Father Schwartz	Episode 1.09 "Bad Kitty"
2018	Mogulettes	Amnon	Television film
2019	The Goldbergs	Jimmie Moore	Episode: "The Wedding Singer"
2019	The Cool Kids	Kip Samgood	Episode: "Kip Samgood's Biggest Fan"
2019	Jackie and the Next-Neighbor Girls	Johnny Bodine	(41 episodes)
2019	Historical Roasts	Franklin D. Roosevelt	Episode: "Anne Frank"
2019	Anything but A..Man..Da!	Michael Stein	Episode: "Pilot"
2020	Saturday Night Live	Alan Dershowitz	Episode: "Adam Driver/Halsey"
2020	Bitmoji TV	Justin Bieber	Voice, Episode: "Demon Bear"
2020	Holey Moley	Himself (Captain Long Jon Lovitz)	(3 episodes)
2020	A.P. Bio	Robin Schwonk	Episode 3.02 "Disgraced"
2021	The Potwins	Henry	Episode: "Blue Collar"
2021	Paper Empire	Stan Katz	Episode: "The Anderson Files"
2023	The Tonight Show	George Santos	Episode: "Colin Jost/Kenya Barris"
2023	The Masked Singer	Himself	Episode: "Comedy Roast Night"
2023	Human Resources	Schmitty from Pity	Voice, Episode: "Pity Party"
2023	Magnum P.I.	Pierre	Episode: "Consciousness of Guilt"
2024	SpongeBob SquarePants	Acceleration T. Greenlight	Episode: "Student Driver Survivor"
2025	Tires	Irate Customer	Episode: "Bonus Money"
2026	The Paper	Todd Dumph	Season 2 (4 episodes)

=== Theatre ===
Year	Title	Role	Venue
2000	The Dinner Party	Albert Donay (replacement)	Music Box Theatre, Broadway

=== Podcasts ===
Year	Title	Role	Notes
2013	Kevin Pollak's Chat Show	Himself/Guest	Episode: "178"
2020	GPS Distress	Manager, NavTerrain	Season 5, Episode 10
2024	Bill Burr's Monday Morning	Himself	February 1, 2024

== Awards and nominations ==
Year	Association	Category	Project	Result	Ref.
1986	Primetime Emmy Award	Outstanding Individual Performance in a Variety Program	Saturday Night Live	Nominated	
1987	Primetime Emmy Award	Outstanding Individual Performance in a Variety Program	Saturday Night Live	Nominated	
1993	American Comedy Awards	Funniest Supporting Actor in a Movie	A League of Their Own	Nominated	
1998	National Board of Review	Best Acting in an Ensemble	Happiness	Won	
2013	Behind the Voice Awards	Best Vocal Performance in a Film	Hotel Transylvania	Nominated	
