= Wrong Reasons =

- Directed by: Josh Roush
- Screenplay by: Josh Roush
- Produced by: Kevin Smith
- Starring: Liv Roush; Ralph Garman; Kevin Smith; Anthony Armentano; Paris Arrowsmith; James Parks; David Koechner
- Distributed by: MVD Entertainment Group
- Release date: 2022
- Running time: 95 minutes
- Country: United States
- Language: English

Wrong Reasons is a 2022 thriller film starring Liv Roush, Kevin Smith and Ralph Garman.

Wrong Reasons director Josh Roush toured throughout the United States promoting the film in January 2023.

The film was distributed in North America by MVD Entertainment Group and in New Zealand, Australia, and Europe by Bounty Entertainment.

== Plot ==
A masked man kidnaps a punk rock singer and triggers a police investigation and media circus.

== External reviews ==
- Wrong Reasons at IMDb
