= Paradise Records (film) =

2025 American film by Logic

- Theatrical poster
- Directed by: Logic
- Written by: Logic
- Produced by: Logic; Jordan Monsanto; Elizabeth Destro; Courtney Tait
- Starring: Logic; Tramayne Hudson; Mary Kelly; Reed Northrup
- Cinematography: Kevin Fletcher
- Edited by: Kevin Smith
- Music by: Sean Wolcott
- Production company: Bobby Boy Films
- Release dates: June 6, 2025 (Tribeca); December 22, 2025 (U.S.)
- Running time: 106 minutes
- Country: United States
- Language: English

Paradise Records is a 2025 American independent stoner comedy film written and directed by Logic. It stars Logic, Tramayne Hudson, Mary Kelly and Reed Northrup. The film serves as Logic’s feature directorial debut and was produced by his production studio, Bobby Boy Films. Its plot follows a record store owner who attempts to save Paradise Records from bankruptcy before a hostage situation.

Logic, who is primarily known as a rapper, began working on Paradise Records after meeting filmmaker J. J. Abrams in 2015. Despite the film's script being complete, Abrams left the project two years later as Logic was left with rejections from Hollywood. Following a brief retirement from his hip-hop career in 2020, he met Kevin Smith and Seth MacFarlane, who both encouraged him to get involved in filmmaking. Smith, in particular, took involvement in the production of Paradise Records. The budget of the film came from Logic's personal finances.

Stylistically, Paradise Records is highly influenced by Clerks (1994) from its retail-based setting, emphasis on character-based dialogue, and absurd situations. The film also takes inspiration from High Fidelity (2000), Friday (1995), Dog Day Afternoon (1975), Pulp Fiction (1994), and the TV series Atlanta. Principal photography took place inside Endlessound Records, a record store in St. Helens, between May and June 2024. The film's soundtrack was recorded by Logic and released in 2026.

Paradise Records premiered at the Tribeca Film Festival on June 6, 2025, and ran for two more screenings over the following week. It was later made available on Blu-Ray and digital streaming providers Apple TV and Amazon Prime Video on December 22. Paradise Records received a positive-to-mixed reception from film critics, with many noting its similarities to Clerks. Some critics complimented its performance, setup, and entertaining appeal, while others criticized the film's crude humor and writing.

== Plot ==
In Bend, Oregon, Cooper, owner of record store Paradise Records, is dealing with imminent foreclosure. He owes the bank $178,000 and has run completely out of extensions to save his vinyl record shop. One day, greedy local arcade owner Mike Hawk arrives to pressure Cooper with an aggressive takeover offer to turn the property into something corporate. Cooper then hides the news from his eccentric staff, trying to maintain a normal business day while secretly panicking over how to find a financial breakthrough before the shop's closure.

As the store opens, the narratives shifts into dialogue-driven comedy by focusing on Cooper's motley crew of employees, including his right-hand man Tramayne, nerdy worker Tables, level-headed Melanie, and sluggish local weed dealer Slaydro. While dealing with bizarre customers and smoking weed, the crew spends their time by engaging in unfiltered, edgy arguments behind the counter, ranging from music history and political correctness to Cooper's own personal experience with his biracial identity.

The casual routine turns upside down later in the afternoon when two clueless thieves attempt to rob Paradise Records. The hilariously unfortunate robbery devolves into a full blown, high-stakes hostage standoff as the record store is locked down by the criminals. Trapped inside together, a life-and-death situation forces Cooper to confess the store's massive debt and impending foreclosure to his staff. Instead of abandoning him, the employees realize how much Cooper and the store mean to them, which prompts them together to outsmart the captors.

With sheer luck, weed-induced absurdity, and accidental heroics, the hostage crisis is successfully defused without serious injuries. In the robbery's aftermath, the local community and Paradise Records' loyal customer base rally around the store. The film concludes on a heartfelt note: while Cooper struggles as a businessman, the culture and haven that he created earned him a chosen family willing to fight for it. The collective support allows Paradise Records to ward off the foreclosure and stay open.

== Cast ==
- Logic as Cooper, the well-meaning troubled owner of Paradise Records who tries to save his store from foreclosure.
  - In addition, Logic plays Uncle Tony, an elderly hustler who experiences financial trouble with the "neighborhood wise guys."
- Tramayne Hudson as T Man, Cooper's cousin and co-worker who loudly makes offensive comments about customers.
- Reed Northrup as Tables, a kind and nerdy man who is enthusiastic about The Lord of the Rings.
- Mary Elizabeth Kelly as Melanie
- Tajh Jordan as Flawless / Tajh, a friend of Cooper who is a drag queen.
- Robert Bryson Hall as Smokey, Cooper's sarcastic and sexually active father.
- Dana Milican as Celeste
- Joseph Gordon-Levitt as The Negotiator
- Ron Perlman as The Chief
- Martin Starr as Mike Hawk, an arcade owner whose store is the rival retailer to Paradise Records.
- David Krumholtz as Wise Guy #2
- Tony Revolori as Slaydro, a cannabis dealer who is unaware of being in house arrest.
- Kevin Corrigan as Wise Guy #1
- Juicy J as JJ
- Bobby Lee as Ll’ DimSome
- Jason Mewes and Kevin Smith as Jay and Silent Bob
- Phil LaMarr as UBS Guy
- Rainn Wilson as Creepy Guy
- Oliver Tree as Bobby

== Background ==
Logic is known as a rapper who received attention for his debut album Under Pressure (2014), releasing nine more projects under his Def Jam Recordings before his departure. He subsequently signed a multi-album deal with BMG in 2022, releasing the albums College Park (2023) and Ultra 85 (2024). Outside of music, Logic took on multiple endeavors, in which he wrote the novels Supermarket (2019) and Ultra 85 (2024) and was briefly a video game streamer.

In a 2025 interview with Collider, Logic recalled his visits to Regal Cinemas as a child in Rockville, Maryland, stating that he was "super poor" and got to see a film "maybe once a year if I was lucky". He "got to go a little more" after leaving his parent's house at the age of seventeen due to a turbulent relationship, in which he later moved in with another family he considered his "godparents". In addition, he considered Kill Bill, Volume 1 (2003) to spark his interest in film. In addition, the film led to his interest in hip-hop after listening to the soundtrack produced by RZA, which made him "fell in love with Wu-Tang Clan" and inspired him to become a music artist.

== Development and funding ==
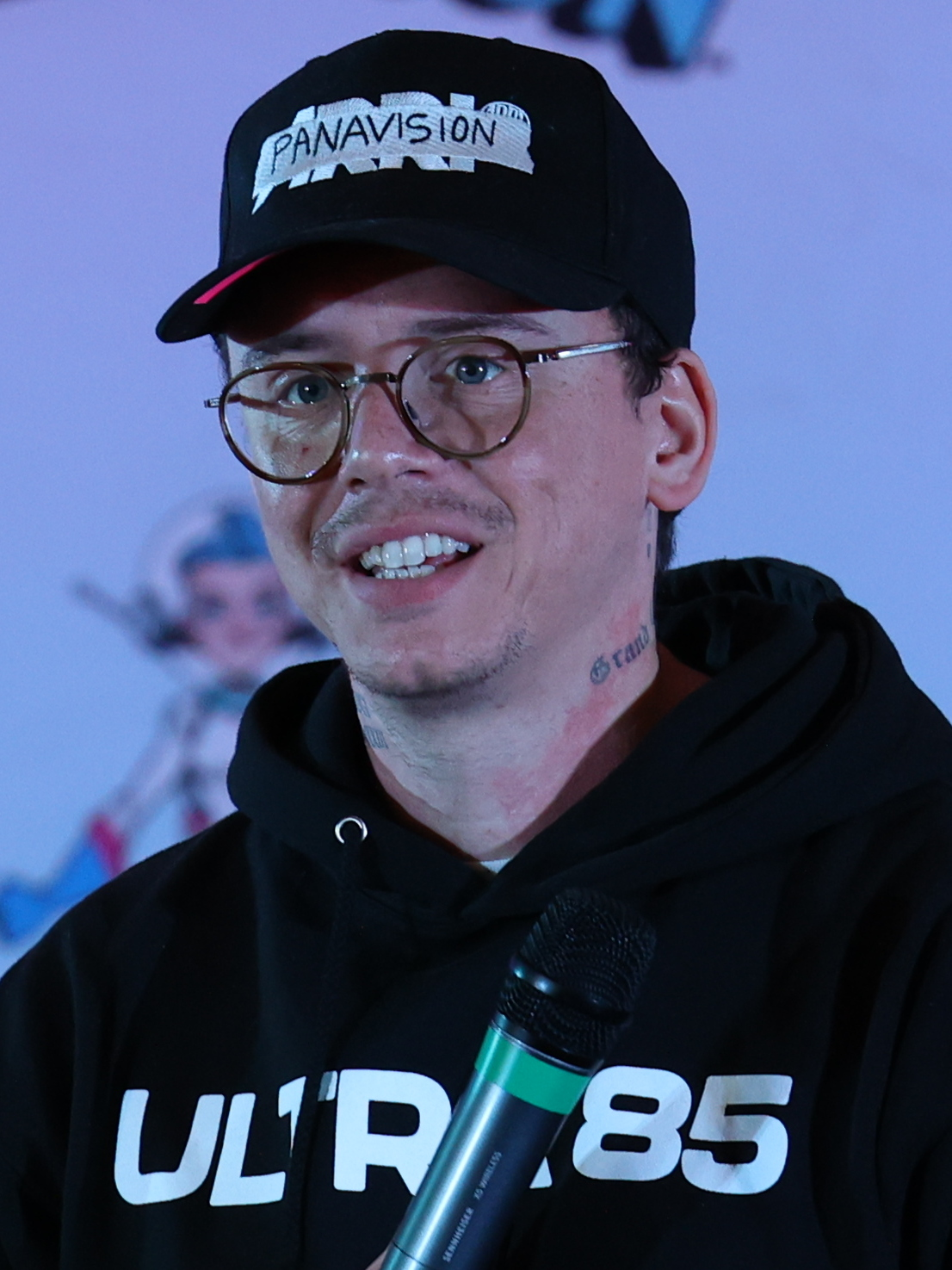
Logic (pictured) wrote the script for Paradise Records years before working with Kevin Smith on the project.

Previously in 2018, Logic revealed that he wrote a comedy film, stating that it came from his love for film and wanting to make people laugh, during an On Air with Ryan Seacrest interview. He also explained that the film's concept was based on a record store. After stepping away from music briefly to focus on his family life in 2020, Logic said that he felt unclear about his life for three years and revealed that the idea of filmmaking often came back to him.

Logic credited J.J. Abrams, Seth MacFarlane, and Kevin Smith for inspiring his venture into filmmaking, as all three encouraged him to take an application to join the Directors Guild of America. Logic met Abrams back in 2015, personally conversating about music and film. He told Abrams that he was working on a script, but the latter told Logic that he would only give advice after he brings out a copy of the script. Afterwards, Abrams' head of film read it and they both told Logic "how they're going to make the movie". Despite the connection, Abrams left the project by 2017. Left with rejections from Hollywood, Logic stepped back from his career to focus on being a father and deal with a "lot of soul searching" and future uncertainty.

Following Logic's brief retirement, he became friends with MacFarlane with their shared love of film and the TV series The Orville, which the latter worked on. During a visit to MacFarlane's house, Logic discussed classic films such as Lawrence of Arabia (1962), Ben-Hur (1959), and Citizen Kane (1941). With MacFarlane being impressed by Logic's knowledge of older films, he encouraged the latter to make a film from his own finances.

After waking up hungover, Logic expressed doubts about making a film and felt "terrified deep down". In less than a week later, Smith called him, in which they discussed mental health, film, media, and art. Smith then tells Logic that he has a role for him in the former's film, The 4:30 Movie (2024). After Logic attended the film's set, he discussed to Smith about various film scripts he wrote before they both decided on one about a record store. Smith's producers Liz Destro and Jordan Monsanto also took interest in the project, encouraging Logic to further develop the film and cast people on it. Logic spent his personal finances on the budget of Paradise Records following rejections in Hollywood based on his inexperience in the film industry.

== Production ==
Paradise Records written and produced by Logic and serves as his directorial debut, who also stars in the film. It was also produced by Logic's studio, Bobby Boy Films. Smith served as its executive producer and editor, also reprising his Silent Bob role alongside Jason Mewes. Other appearances in the film include Ron Perlman, Rainn Wilson, Joseph Gordon-Levitt, Kevin Corrigan, Diedrich Bader, Martin Starr, Bobby Lee, rapper Juicy J, comedian Donnell Rawlings, Logic's father, son, and wife Brittney. Logic later credited his wife for supporting his film endeavors.

=== Pre-production ===
Preferring a concise approach to the film's budget, Logic worked on its pre-production for twenty days to get "everything ready," wanting to make sure he was "completely off book" by the first day. Right before the film's production, he researched the works of David Mamet, Sidney Lumet, and John Badham, and called Abrams for advice, in which the latter told him that he's "literally making a movie" but encouraged Logic to "have fun" as his top priority. He later considered that experience to be the "hardest and best days of my life."

=== Writing ===
Paradise Records takes influence from multiple films that Logic had been personally a fan of, including Clerks (1994), High Fidelity (2000), Friday (1995), Dog Day Afternoon (1975), and Pulp Fiction (1994), as well as the TV series Atlanta. Primarily, the film's plot is based on a "beleaguered" record store owner who attempts to save Paradise Records from bankruptcy, with additional characters including his "street-struck" father, pimp uncle, and various slackers and music heads played by Logic's real-life friends. Throughout the film, Logic's character, Cooper, deals with irritating customers, "suburban malaise", unsupportive debt collectors, and a hostage. The film's comedic style is described as deadpan and "offbeat energy".

The film is described as a dialogue-driven independent stoner comedy and often features crass humor throughout, including "endless conversations" based on the word nigga, women's bodies, masturbation, LGBT slurs, and "putting down sensitive guys." Instead of a "front-to-back story", Paradise Records emphasizes a vignette-style structure and interactions between its characters. GeekTyrant reviewer Jessica Fisher characterized the film as reminiscent of 1990s films, which usually take place in malls, record stores, comic book shops, diners, video stores, and other small-town environments. Ema Sasic of NextBestPicture described Paradise Records as a 2025 "upgrade" of Clerks but with "even more idiotic conversations and over-the-top situations to the forefront."

=== Filming ===
With a crew of fifty people, principal photography for Paradise Records took place inside Endlessound Records between May and June 2024, which opened a few years prior in St. Helens, Oregon. While the record store's owner Loric Riggs was moving Endlessound Records to a larger location, he received a call from a film location scout, asking if he was interested in allowing Paradise Records to film in his shop. He was unsure about the decision, but later felt that it was "perfect for them" as they were able to come back into the store before becoming "super well-established" once it was used as a film set. During the filming of Paradise Records, Logic allowed some improvisation and also established a "no assholes" policy, wanting everyone to be "welcome and loved."

=== Editing ===
The original cut of Paradise Records was two hours and fifty minutes, in which Logic considered to have taught him about emphasizing quality over quantity, such as not having to "say the same thing twice." Smith served as the film's editor, having begun doing so on the first day of the film's shooting. Logic noted that in the film's trailer, Smith's head was visible as he was "sitting on the couch editing on his laptop". Surprised by it, Logic wanted to leave the appearance as an easter egg in Paradise Records.

A week and a half after principal photography for the film was complete, Logic and his film crew flew to Los Angeles to edit Paradise Records at Smith's house. The former reflected that there were several times where they "butted heads" over the post-production but was resolved with Smith trusting Logic's approach to the film's editing. In addition, Smith added his own sound effects to the film. Two days after it was complete, Logic and Smith held a screening of Paradise Records for their friends and family, which totaled to 45 people.

=== Music ===
Paradise Records featured "a lot of music" throughout the film. Logic wanted to make a "classic '90s, awesome, fun song" that his character Cooper dances to in the opening scene. He considered making a $250,000 budget song but opted out by deciding to use his own unreleased music. On July 31, 2026, Logic released the film's soundtrack to streaming services, preceded by the singles "Catch Me If You Can", "Bad Motherfucker", "FOMO", and "Its All Your Fault".

== Release ==
On May 1, 2025, Logic released the trailer for Paradise Records on his YouTube channel. On June 6, the film premiered at the Tribeca Film Festival, and ran again on June 7 and June 13-14, with three screenings being sold out within 24 hours of availability. Prior to an invitation from Tribeca, Logic initially considered spending over $150,000 on a screening at the Grauman's Chinese Theatre.

On October 17, Logic revealed that he made over $1 million in pre-sales for the Blu-ray release of Paradise Records. He added that only ten copies contained a "golden ticket" that allowed the receiver and a guest to spend a day with Logic in Portland. The Blu-ray release comes with additional features including five unreleased albums by Logic, a director's commentary featuring him and Smith, deleted scenes, bloopers, a "making of the film" documentary, and a music video. On December 22, Paradise Records was made available digitally on Apple TV and Amazon Prime Video.

== Reception ==
Paradise Records received a positive-to-mixed reception from film critics. In his review for Elements of Madness, writer Douglas Davidson gave the film four out of five stars and placed it under the website's "Films to Watch" recommendations. While he noted that Paradise Records was heavily involved by Smith and rarely distinct from "one crazy day" retail comedies, Davidson consider its rhythm and Logic's performance to be the highlights of the film. He also commended Logic for being "extraordinarily generous" to his ensemble cast as well as it being diverse.

GeekTyrant reviewer Jessica Fisher described the film as a "good time full of lighthearted, R-rated fun", and stated she had a "blast watching it." Damon Wise of Deadline noted that although the comedy from Paradise Records doesn't always land, he described the film as having an "anarchic charm" and considered it to be a "slick and enjoyable debut" from Logic. Joey Magidson of Awards Radar gave Paradise Records three out of five stars, writing that it was "one of the better films at Tribeca that I've seen this year." Although he saw the film's third act as less interesting and that it is overall resemblant of Clerks, Magidson complimented Logic's debut in filmmaking and the cast's chemistry.

Ema Sasic of NextBestPicture noticed the film being heavy influenced by Clerks, complementing its cameos and "day-in-the-life setup". However, she considered Paradise Records to be inferior to Clerks. stating that Logic's comedic style of "silly voices" and impressions "very rarely lands". She also criticized the film's use of deliberately crude humor that makes it "tedious to sit through". On the other hand, Sasic considered the supporting character T Man to be far more interesting and stated that the guest appearances bring more "energy and laughs" into Paradise Records.

Writing for Pitchfork, Alphonse Pierre extensively criticized the film for its crude humor, particularly its racial puns and topics related to biracial identity. He characterized its pacing as "wannabe Chappelle's Show skits with a mumblecore spirit". Despite Pierre's criticism, he does not consider Paradise Records to be "all bad", complimenting its cameos, moments where it "gets its heart", and Logic's artistic influence. Similarly, Morgan Shaunette, writing for Willamette Week, saw the film as "looking like a pale imitation" of Clerks. He also criticized its writing, describing it as being based on "circular conversations and lazy dick jokes."
