= Hollywood Babble-On =

Podcast

- Genre: TV & Film, Comedy, Pop Culture
- Language: English

Cast and voices
- Hosted by: Ralph Garman; Kevin Smith

Production
- Production: Kevin Smith; Ralph Garman; Josh Roush
- Length: 90-151 minutes

Technical specifications
- Audio format: MP3

Publication
- No. of episodes: 420
- Original release: August 24, 2010
- Provider: SModcast.com
- Updates: Variable (Weekly/Fortnightly/Monthly)

Reception
- Ratings: M- Mature

Related
- Website: www.smodcast.com/channel/hollywoodbabbleon/

Hollywood Babble-On is a podcast featuring filmmaker Kevin Smith and radio personality Ralph Garman. The show features Smith and Garman discussing the week's celebrity, movie, and other pop culture news.

== Show history ==
Kevin Smith was a frequent guest on a popular Los Angeles Ca, Radio show Kevin and Bean on 106.7 KROQ-FM, and suggested to Ralph Garman (entertainment reporter) they do a show on the station. They recorded two pilots, which were passed on. The show was called The Showbiz Beat (after Garman's regular spot on the Kevin and Bean Show) and was released in 2012 as Hollywood Babble-On #91. In August 2010, Garman and Smith started recording Hollywood Babble-On at Smith's SModcastle theater; the podcast was subsequently moved to the larger capacity Jon Lovitz Comedy Club & Podcast Theatre, formerly known as the Jon Lovitz Comedy Club. The show also tours, but this is limited due to Garman's day job. On April 22, 2013, Smith announced through Twitter that the podcast would no longer be recorded at the Lovitz after a falling out with Lovitz. He announced on April 25 that the show's new regular home will be The Hollywood Improv from May 24 onwards. Said comments and a further explanation on the falling-out with Lovitz were addressed at the beginning of Episode #126 of the podcast (recorded on May 4, 2013, but was later removed).

Garman gained a significant amount of public attention in December 2017, after being let go from his long-time position at KROQ, due to downsizing by new management. On a wave of support from local, national, and international fans (accumulated from his work on both KROQ & Hollywood Babble-On) Garman launched his own new podcast called The Ralph Report. He now hosts this podcast full-time, as well as co-hosting Hollywood Babble-On. With Garman no longer tied to KROQ, Hollywood Babble-On has been freed up to tour more than it was able to in earlier years.

On September 14, 2018, Garman announced that he and Smith were being sued by the Hollywood Chamber of Commerce for unauthorized use of the image of the Hollywood sign, and of the Hollywood Walk of Fame Star in their visual representation of the show.

== Format ==
The show discusses current events happening in Hollywood, and includes segments (of variable frequency) such as:

- What Strain is Kevin on?: The opening segment in which Garman asks Smith what cannabis strain he has been smoking before the show.
- KevIN: Garman presents various photographs sent in by fans of the podcast, which have been modified to include Smith's image.
- Shout Outs: Garman reads out Emails from people in the audience.
- Email Bag: Garman reads out Emails from people from all over the world.
- Inappropriate Toys: Garman and Smith review pictures of toys sent in by listeners, that are obviously bad choices for one reason or another.
- Kevin Smith: Butthole Judge: Garman presents audience submitted media clips of high-profile actors in nude scenes, and Smith determines whether the celebrity's posterior orifice is visible. This is an extension from the "Anne Heche's Butthole" segment discussed early in the podcast, during which Anne Heche's posterior is revealed in the Gus Van Sant remake of Alfred Hitchcock's Psycho.
- Green Lantern Oath: Garman recites the Green Lantern oath in the guise of different famous personalities.
- Creepy Clown Time: Garman sings Entrance of the Gladiators to Smith to scare him (Smith is notoriously afraid of clowns), in the manner of various famous personalities. In episode #254 (8/26/2016), Garman does a hybridized version of Creepy Clown Time, in which he sings an amalgamation of Happy Birthday with the Entrance of the Gladiators theme.
- Hitler in the Movies: Where Hitler (and the Nazis in general) is/are inserted into movie titles. This segment was retired in episode 271, 2/11/2017, and replaced by a similar segment involving Donald Trump in the presidency.
- Inappropriate Toys: The segment shows toys and games that were designed for children that contain (often unintentionally) sexual and/or scatological imagery.
- PPAP (Pen-Pineapple-Apple-Pen): Garman sings to the background music of this song made popular by Japanese popstar Pikotaro, in the voice of various fan-requested celebrities.
- They’re Coming to Take Me Away, Ha-Haaa! – Napoleon XIV: Garman sings the song in a variety of voices.
- Your Town's Got a Fucked Up Name: In a segment initiated by fans sending in signs displaying their hometown names, Garman and Smith discuss the variably questionable names of towns around the globe. In episode #280 (6/2/2017), this segment receives its own official segment theme.
- What the Fuck, Japan?: In a segment initiated by the popularity of PPAP (Pen-Pineapple-Apple-Pen), Garman and Smith discuss the latest news regarding inexplicably popular fads in Japan. In episode #272 (2/18/2017), this segment receives its own official segment theme.
- Arnold Sings Children's Themes: Garman sings various songs, usually children's themes, in the voice of Arnold Schwarzenegger.
- Arnold Sings 80s Hits: Garman sings popular music of the 1980s in the voice of Arnold Schwarzenegger.
- Stallone Sings: Garman sings in the voice of Sylvester Stallone.
- Dynamic Duets: Garman and Smith sing duet songs in the voices of Adam West's Batman and Tom Hardy's Bane.
- Pee-Wee Herman Monologues: Garman recites famous monologues from various movies and television shows in the voice of character Pee Wee Herman.
- Tinseltown Stiffs: Where recently deceased Hollywood celebrities are discussed.
- This Week in Bad Names: Where Garman self-admittedly "goes off the rails", and calls into question the names chosen by celebrities for their offspring. (official segment theme initiated 8/26/2016)
- Shit That Should Not Be: An exposure of errors made on set or in production on a finished piece.
- Exquisite Acting: Similar to the previous, except exposing poorly delivered performances by actors/actresses.
- Hollywood Helper: Where the pair point out acts of helpfulness or charity amongst the show business crowd.
- No Thanks- We've Already Got One: Garman discusses new upcoming television shows or movies that are remakes of old material. (official segment theme initiated 11/11/2016)
- HB-O Headlines: Garman reviews current news headlines related to celebrities.
- Movies That Will Suck: Which predicts upcoming productions that tout a lackluster premise, usually revolving around needless sequels or remakes.
- Geek News: The duo discuss upcoming TV, movies, comics etc. falling under the geek umbrella.
- PorgsIN: In this subset segment of Geek News, fans of the show send in artwork depicting the inclusion of the newest Star Wars universe characters Porgs in various scenarios, a la KevIN segment fashion. Debuted on 10/20/2017, Episode 295.
- How Big is Liam Neeson's Cock?: Each show also finishes with their favored entries submitted by members of the public from the Tumblr account Liam Neeson's Cock (a page dedicated to fictitious claims originally based on Janice Dickinson's comparison of Liam Neeson's penis to an Evian bottle).

Each segment is preceded by a characteristic lead-in introduction song.

Other recurring segments on the show have involved the hosts discussing the latest exploits of celebrities including Lindsay Lohan, Miley Cyrus, Justin Bieber, Kim Kardashian, Farrah Abraham and Amanda Bynes.

When discussing current events with Smith, Garman will also perform impressions of famous actors such as Harrison Ford, Al Pacino, Charlton Heston, Adam West, Truman Capote, Arnold Schwarzenegger, Ed Wynn, and Sylvester Stallone. Fans of the show have created an informal drinking game (mostly centered on Garman's phrase "How dare you, sir?" and Smith's overuse of the word "whatnot"), which the hosts have mentioned approvingly.

== Hollywood Babble-On Comic Con Theater ==
Smith has had all three issues of his comic series Batman: Cacophony "dramatized" during three special episodes of his podcast, entitled Hollywood Babble-On Comic Con Theater. Primarily performed by his co-host Ralph Garman, who used several of his better-known impressions to represent the main characters, both episodes were essentially a read-through of one of the issues of the story. Garman's voicing of the main characters included the "voices" of Adam West as Batman, Ed Wynn as the Joker (initially, this was Garman's impression of Cesar Romero's Joker, but Smith suggested using Wynn's voice instead), Sean Connery as Commissioner Gordon, and Al Pacino as Maxie Zeus. Smith acted as the "omnipotent narrator" and voice of Onomatopoeia in both episodes. In the first episode (podcast #43), an audience member was brought up to cover several other minor character roles; in the second episode (podcast #65), Smith brought in voice-over actor/announcer Kyle Hebert to voice Alfred (which he did in a cockney accent somewhat reminiscent of Michael Caine, who played Alfred in Batman Begins and The Dark Knight) and others, and cohort Jason Mewes to voice most of the female characters. (Smith and Hebert also voiced two of Zeus' henchmen, as well as other characters in the second episode.)

Smith's other comic Batman: The Widening Gyre, which is a six-part series, is also being "dramatized" on Hollywood Babble-On Comic Con Theater.

Garman and Smith also acted out their collaborative comic series special issues where Batman (Adam West's version) and Green Hornet (Van Williams' version) met again to take on General Gumm (Roger C. Carmel's Colonel Gumm with a higher ranking) and The Joker (Cesar Romero's version). The comic series is significant for being the first crossover between the 1966 Batman series and The Green Hornet series since the 1967's episode "Batman's Satisfaction" (with guest stars from The Green Hornet's Van Williams and Bruce Lee).

In Episode 306 (New Year's Eve Episode 2017), Garman and Smith perform Babble-On Theatre for the first time on a work not written by either. Batman 66, Issue 27 "Bane Enters the Ring", serves as the centerpiece for the episode.

In Episode 337, Garman and Smith perform a portion of Smith's Green Arrow: Quiver comic book (Green Arrow, Vol 3, Issue 4 of ten).

Content	Episode(s)
Batman: Cacophony Episode 1	43
Batman: Cacophony Episode 2	65
Batman: Cacophony Episode 3	104
Batman: The Widening Gyre Episode 1	147
Batman: The Widening Gyre Episode 1, 2	268
Batman '66 Meets the Green Hornet Issue 1	Fatman on Batman Podcast #66
Batman '66 Meets the Green Hornet Issue 2	175
Batman '66 Meets the Green Hornet Issue 3	180
Batman '66 Meets the Green Hornet Issue 4	184
Batman '66 Meets the Green Hornet Issue 5	188
Batman '66 Meets the Green Hornet Issue 6	193
Batman '66 Issue 27	306
Green Arrow Vol 3 Quiver Issue 4	337

== TV show ==
In July 2012 Smith and Garman announced they were in negotiations with an unnamed network about a Hollywood Babble-On TV show. They revealed in February 2013 that it would not be going ahead as the network wanted them to stop the podcast as a part of the deal and other network negotiation/communication issues.

In November 2013 the duo revealed that AMC had shown interest in a TV show and in March 2014 The Hollywood Reporter confirmed AMC have ordered a pilot which will be filmed on Sunday August 3 following an August 2 rehearsal.

On October 10, 2014, AMC announced that they have decided not to continue its line of Unscripted Television shows except for Comic Book Men and Talking Dead. Because of this the Hollywood Babble-On TV Show was not picked up. The pilot was released via BabbleVision in 2017.

== BabbleVision ==
Starting from June 2, 2017, each show of Hollywood Babble-On is now available as a full, professionally shot, video at BabbleVision.com as part of SModCo's subscription based service SModCost. During weeks in which there is no show, supplementary bonus material will be provided in the way of Classic Babble episodes. The show is shot and edited by Josh Roush of Roush Multimedia.

== Awards and recognition ==
In 2010, the podcast was placed upon iTunes' Best Podcasts of 2010 and won the 2012 Stitcher award for Best Film & TV podcast. It then won the Best Entertainment + Pop Culture podcast at the 2013 Stitcher awards.
