= The Raging Nathans =

American band

- Origin: Dayton, Ohio
- Genres: Punk music
- Years active: 2009-present
- Members: Josh Goldman - Guitar Vocals; Nick Hamby - Guitar/Vocals Patrick Cost - Drums; Christian Roerig Bass/Vocals
- Past members: Dereck Brown - Bass; Jared Reynolds - Bass; Eric Dunn - Second Guitar
- Website: theragingnathans.com

The Raging Nathans are an American punk rock band formed in Dayton, Ohio, in 2009. The group is known for its extensive discography, energetic live performances, and association with Rad Girlfriend Records, a label operated by founding member Josh Goldman. The band has released six studio albums, numerous EPs, and split records, and has toured extensively across the United States and internationally.

== Overview ==
The Raging Nathans was formed in 2009 in Dayton, Ohio, by Josh Goldman (guitar, vocals), Nick Hamby (drums, vocals), and Dereck Brown (bass). Their first EP was released in 2012.

Jared Reynolds replaced Dereck Brown shortly before the recording of their first record, "Losing It," in 2014, although both Dereck Brown and Jared Reynolds appear on the recordings of "Losing It" (2014) and "Cheap Fame" (2018).

Shortly after the release of "Cheap Fame" (2018), Nick Hamby moved from drums to second guitar. Patrick Cost (drums) took over drum duties, and Christian Roerig (bass, vocals) replaced Jared Reynolds after a tumultuous UK tour in 2018. Eric Dunn (deceased, 1986 - 2024) played second guitar for the band for several years starting in 2016. He appeared on most of the band's studio albums in some form until his death in 2024.

The band quickly gained a following in the local punk scene for their high-energy live shows and catchy, melodic songs. Over the years, The Raging Nathans have released multiple albums and EPs, including Losing It (2014), Cheap Fame (2018), Oppositional Defiance (2020), Waste My Heart (2021), Still Spitting Blood (2023), and Room For One More (2025) Their music blends elements of melodic punk, pop-punk, skate punk, and hardcore.

The band has toured worldwide, sharing stages with notable punk acts and building a dedicated fanbase. They are also known for their DIY ethos, with Goldman running Rad Girlfriend Records, having released over 200 records, including almost every release from The Raging Nathans.

== Members ==
- Josh Goldman - Guitar Vocals (2009–present)
- Nick Hamby - Guitar/Vocals (2018–present) Drums/Vocals (2009 - 2018)
- Patrick Cost - Drums (2018–present)
- Christian Roerig Bass/Vocals (2018–Present)

=== Past members ===
- Dereck Brown - Bass (2009 - 2014)
- Jared Reynolds - Bass (2014 - 2018)
- Eric Dunn - Second Guitar (2016 - 2018)

== Discography ==
=== Studio albums ===
- Losing It - (2014)
- Cheap Fame - (2018)
- Oppositional Defiance - (2020)
- Waste My Heart - (2021)
- Still Spitting Blood - (2023)
- Room For One More - (2025)

=== Compilation albums ===
- Sleeper Hits: Sordid Youth Vol. 1 (2019)
- Failures in Art: Sordid Youth Vol. 2 (2022)
- Bad Timing: Sordid Youth Vol. 3 (2025)

=== Live records ===
- Split LP w/ Middle-Aged Queers (2024)
- Live From Wonkfest EP (2020)

=== EPs ===
- Self Titled EP (2012)
- Long Way Home EP (2014)

=== Splits ===
- Split w/ The Slow Death (2015)
- Split w/ Nobodys (2016)
- Split w/ Wonk Unit (2016)
- Split w/ Rad Company (2017)
- Split w/ Pizzatramp (2017)
- Split w/ Parasites (2018)
- Split w/ Jon Cougar Concentration Camp (2018)
- Split w/ Dead Bars (2020)
- Split w/ Starter Jackets (2020)
- Split w/ The Reaganomics (2020)
- Split w/ The Voice of God (2021)
- Split w/Dwarves (2021)
- Split w/Mikey Erg (2023)
- Split w/The Story Changes (2023)
- Split w/Fat Heaven (2026)

=== Singles ===
- Bring Me The Head of Betsy Devos single (2021)
- Untitled single (2023)
