= Bad Cop/Bad Cop =

American punk band

- Origin: San Pedro, California, U.S.
- Genres: Punk rock; skate punk; riot grrrl
- Years active: 2011–present
- Label: Fat Wreck Chords
- Members: Stacey Dee; Myra Gallarza; Linh Le; Alex Windsor
- Past members: Jen Carlson; Jennie Cotterill

Bad Cop/Bad Cop is an American punk rock band from San Pedro, California, United States. They are currently signed to Fat Wreck Chords.

== History ==
Bassist Jen Carlson founded the band in January 2011 together with her longtime colleague Stacey Dee (vocals / guitar) as well as Myra Gallarza (drums) and Jennie Cotterill (vocals / guitar). The band name is an allusion to the idiom "Good Cop, Bad Cop". The band initially started touring locally and expanded their reach to the East coast of the United States. In 2012 the first demo Get Rad appeared, followed by a self-titled 7’’. Carlson left the band shortly after the recordings, but introduced the group to their successor Linh Le.

Having recorded, since then, their EPs independently in 2013 Dee convinced friend Fat Mike to come to see the band perform at the Lilith Bear Womyn's Festival in San Francisco. He signed them within a week on his label Fat Wreck Chords and released the EP Boss Lady. Their debut album Not Sorry was released in June 2015. The band was allowed to play on Fat Wreck's subsequent 25th Anniversary Tour, though problems connected with Stacey Dee's drug addiction negatively affected the band until they chose to leave the tour. Fat Mike supported Stacey Dee in her recovery and the band claims to have grown closer going through this experience.

After overcoming this negative moment, the band start recording their second album Warriors in which Fat Mike was involved as a producer together with Warsop and also contributed to some ideas. The album finally appeared in June 2017, exactly two years after their debut album. The band then took part in the Vans Warped Tour. For the European Tour 2019 of Me First and the Gimme Gimmes Stacey Dee filled in for Joey Cape on few dates. The band released their third full-length album via Fat Wreck Chords in June 2020, entitled The Ride.

In October 2022, it was recognised that Alexandra Windsor had been engaged as a second guitarist. Windsor is a professional musician from Los Angeles who can be booked for live performances, sessions and lessons.

Jennie Cotterill has explained in several interviews that leaving the band was disappointing and one-sided for her. The band focussed on commercial success and the resulting peer pressure took the fun out of music-making and creativity. In 2024 Cotterill founded the LA-based band Reckoner. The band released their first single on Double Helix Records.

The single ‘Shattered’ by Bad Cop/Bad Cop was released on Fatwreck on 13 October 2023. The single is said to be the first release from the band's latest album. The band members have mentioned the new album several times in Instagram comments. The original release date was supposed to be in fall 2024, but has been spared several times and has still not been announced.

The rumours surrounding the sale of Fatwreck to Hopeless Records suggest that the album will be released on Hopeless Records later in 2025.

In March 2025, the band gave an interview to the German fanzine Plasticbomb about the upcoming album. It is due to be released on 11 July and the first singles will be released in April, May and June. It is unclear whether the album will be released by Fat Wreck or Hopeless Records. The band explained that Fat Mike was no longer involved as a producer. In terms of content, the band deals with very personal topics such as age and health.

The band released their fourth album, Lighten Up, in September 2025 via a Hopeless Records and Fat Wreck Chords partnership.

== Band members ==
Current members

- Stacey Dee – lead and backing vocals, rhythm guitar (2011–present)
- Myra Gallarza – drums, backing vocals (2011–present)
- Linh Le – bass, lead and backing vocals (2013–present)
- Alexandra Windsor – lead guitar, backing vocals (2022–present)

Former members

- Jen Carlson – bass, backing vocals (2011–2013)
- Jennie Cotterill – lead and backing vocals, guitar (2011–2022)

Timeline

== Discography ==
=== Studio albums ===
- Not Sorry (2015)
- Warriors (2017)
- The Ride (2020)
- Lighten Up (2025)

=== EPs ===
- Get Rad (2012)
- Bad Cop/Bad Cop (2013)
- Boss Lady (2014)

=== Singles ===
- "Don" (split with "Surreal" by Barb Wire Dolls) (2016)
- "Shattered" / "Safe and Legal" (2023)

=== Compilation appearances ===
- Fat Music Vol. 8 - Going Nowhere Fat (2015 - Fat Wreck Chords)
