= Fatman Beyond =

Pop culture podcast

Fatman on Batman Fatman Beyond
- Genre: Comedy, Commentary
- Language: English

Cast and voices
- Hosted by: Kevin Smith & Marc Bernardin

Production
- Length: Approx. 1 Hour

Technical specifications
- Audio format: MP3

Publication
- No. of episodes: 474
- Original release: June 1, 2012
- Provider: SModcast.com

Related
- Website: www.smodcast.com/channel/fatmanbeyond

Fatman Beyond is a podcast and video series in which hosts, filmmaker Kevin Smith and writer Marc Bernardin, explore their geeky interests, originally focusing on the DC comic property Batman. The podcast was originally titled Fatman on Batman, but was retitled Fatman Beyond after Smith's weight loss. The show is part of the SModcast Podcast Network.

== Show History ==
Paul Dini joined Kevin Smith for the first Fatman Beyond, originally called "Fatman on Batman" was released on June 1, 2012. The episode focused on Dini's experience writing for Batman: The Animated Series. Many of the early episodes centered on Batman: The Animated Series featuring guests that worked on the series. While Smith has been a lifelong fan of the Batman, he maintains a strong connection to Batman: The Animated Series. Smith often notes that Batman, as voiced by Kevin Conroy and written by Dini, is his touchstone for Batman. During the progression of Fatman Beyond Smith has been joined by a variety of guests including past and present DC Comic authors and artists, voice actors, live action actors, iconic members of the comic community, individuals who have added to the Batman mythology, Smith's friends with a devotion to Batman, and longtime friend and colleague Scott Mosier. Fatman Beyond directly addresses the personal impact the Batman mythology has had on individuals on the show. Guests have noted that they have found strength, hope and solace in the ideals espoused in the mythology of Batman. On several occasions Smith has been moved to tears describing attributes of the Batman.

In 2015, Smith, along with Marc Bernardin started streaming a video version of Fatman Beyond on Smith's official YouTube channel. Guests include Alan Tudyk, Nathan Fillion, David Dastmalchian, Paul Dini, Chris Daughtry and more.

== Format ==
Fatman Beyond is primarily an interview-oriented dialogue between Kevin and a guest of his choice. Episodes follow a loose structure where Smith explores the guest's background, personal connection with the character and, if applicable, how the guest became involved with the Batman mythology. Recurring guests delve deeper into personal histories, expand on how the character impacted their lives or discuss their contributions to character. While several guests have reappeared in episodes, as of February 17, 2015, the most frequent guests are Paul Dini and Marc Bernardin. Smith and Dini dive deep into all things related to Batman: The Animated Series, while Smith and Bernardin provide commentaries on Batman films.

== Fatman Beyond Guests ==
An individual who has been affected by or influenced the Batman mythos often joins Smith on Fatman Beyond. Guests include actors who have portrayed Batman and other characters in the Bat-verse, writers and artists involved with DC Comics as well as others who join big Kev Smith in his love of Batman. Guests include: Paul Dini (Writer for Batman the Animated Series / Creator of Harley Quinn); Bruce Timm (Producer of Batman the Animated Series), Adam West (Batman, Batman '66), Kevin Conroy (Batman, Batman Animated Series), Diedrich Bader (Batman, Batman: Brave and the Bold); Mark Hamill (Joker, Batman Animated Series); Scott Snyder / Gregg Capullo (Writer / Artist of DC Comic's New 52 Batman); Stan Lee (Not Batman Related–it's Stan Lee (Note: Stan Lee did, however, create a version of Batman for DC's Just Imagine... series)) and Jamie Walton (President, Wayne Foundation). Complete guest list and episodes appearances:

Guest	Episode(s)
Paul Dini	1, 17, 18, 20, 21, 51, 52
Mark Hamill	2, 3
Tara Strong	4
Arleen Sorkin	5
Walt Flanagan	6, 10, 50
Bruce Timm	7
Scott Mosier	8
Ralph Garman	9, 12, 40, 66
Kevin Conroy	11
Adam West	13
Marc Bernardin	14, 25, 46, 47, 49, 58, 59, 75
Diedrich Bader	16
Scott Snyder	19, 48
Kyle Higgins	22, 23, 42, 43
Grant Morrison	26, 27, 44
Geoff Johns	28, 29
Christopher Drake	30, 31
Jeph Loeb	32, 33
Stan Lee	34
Dan Didio	35
Jim Lee	36, 37
Greg Capullo	38, 39, 48
Marc Tyler Nobleman	53
Neal Adams	54, 55, 56, 71, 72
Denny O’Neil	60, 61, 62
Joe Quesada	63, 67, 80
Chris Daughtry	64
Dean Trippe	65
Jamie Walton	70
Burt Ward	74
Brett Culp	57
Ming Chen	50
Bryan Johnson	50
Mike Zapcic	50
Live Panels	24, 68, 69, 73
No Guest	41, 45

== Kevin Smith connection to Batman ==
Smith is a strong advocate and Vice President of The Wayne Foundation, which is led by Jamie Walton (founder and president). The Wayne Foundation is committed to spreading awareness of commercial sexual exploitation of children and domestic minor sexual trafficking (DMST) occurring within the United States. The Foundation's goal is to provide young women in the United States who have fallen victim to DMST with a means of leaving the sex industry for good by providing a safe home environment with rehabilitation services.

Smith has separately worked with long-time friends Walt Flanagan and Ralph Garman on two Batman projects for DC Comics. Flanagan and Smith created the Batman: Cacophony (2008–2009) and Batman: The Widening Gyre (2009-2010) arcs, while Smith and Garman worked on Batman ‘66 Meets Green Hornet (2014).

DC tapped Smith to chair or take part in several panel discussions held as part of DC Comics’s year-long celebration of the 75th anniversary of Batman (2014).

Actor Ben Affleck, a long-time friend of Kevin Smith, played Batman in 2016's Batman v Superman: Dawn of Justice. Smith, often attributed with helping to jump-start Affleck’s career, notes his continued support for his friend, stating, "Now I know a dude who plays my favorite character on the planet, and this is an actor who I believed in from the jump, and everything he performed in I was a big fan of, and still remain a fan of." Smith currently resides in the home formerly occupied by Affleck. The home sports a 'Batcave entrance', which Affleck, a long time Bat-fan, had installed prior to Smith's ownership.
