= The Last Gang =

American punk rock band

- Origin: Los Angeles
- Genres: Punk rock
- Label: Fat Wreck Chords
- Members: Brenna Red; Sean Viele; Ken Aquino; Sam Mankinen
- Past members: Robby Wantland
- Website: www.thelastgang.com

The Last Gang is a 21st-century American punk rock quartet from the Los Angeles area.

The band was formed in the 2000s by singer and guitarist Brenna Red. It went through various personnel changes (Red being the consistent member) and occasionally went on hiatus.

The Last Gang began to break out in 2017 with a British tour and a single on Fat Wreck Chords, releasing a full album, Keep Them Counting, in 2018 and being picked as one of 18 artists to watch in 2018 by Alternative Press. The band's third album, Noise Noise Noise, was released on October 8, 2021.

== Discography ==
=== Albums ===
- Employee's Picks Vol. 1 (2013, self-released)
- Keep Them Counting (2018, Fat Wreck Chords #FAT995-1)
- Noise Noise Noise (2021, Fat Wreck Chords #FAT142)
- Obscene Daydreams (2024, Fat Wreck Chords)

=== Singles and EPs ===
- Continuity Breakout (EP, 2010, Nothing But A Nightmare records)
- "Sing For Your Supper" (single, 2017, Fat Wreck Chords #FAT 327)
- "Noise Noise Noise" (single, 2021, Fat Wreck Chords)
