= Jay & Silent Bob Get Old =

- Genre: Comedy
- Language: English

Cast and voices
- Hosted by: Kevin Smith; Jason Mewes

Production
- Length: Approximately 1 hour

Technical specifications
- Audio format: MP3

Publication
- No. of episodes: 238
- Original release: August 19, 2010 – April 9, 2020
- Provider: SModcast.com
- Updates: Wednesday

Jay & Silent Bob Get Old is a podcast featuring filmmaker Kevin Smith and actor Jason Mewes. The podcast features Jason Mewes talking about his past drug addictions and sexual encounters. The podcast has toured across the United States and internationally to Australia, Canada, and the United Kingdom. iTunes named the podcast one of the best podcasts of 2010.

== Format ==
The podcast is designed to keep Mewes sober and started several months after Mewes regained his sobriety following a relapse (Vicodin for surgery). He has been sober since July 2, 2010. One of the issues Smith and Mewes have while doing the podcast, is audiences expect them to come in character, while in reality it is styled after a conversation. Another common feature, known as "Let Us F**k", involves Mewes and audience members demonstrating fake sex positions. Thanks to the success of the podcast and Mewes remaining clean, he has been able to buy a house.

== Travel and charity ==
Originally the podcast was based at Universal CityWalk in The Jon Lovitz Comedy Club & Podcast Theatre, until Smith and Mewes took it on tour. Jay & Silent Bob Get Old's 100th podcast was recorded at The Jon Lovitz Comedy Club & Podcast Theatre and proceeds went to the Hurricane Sandy New Jersey Relief Fund. The podcast went on tour with Jay & Silent Bob's Super Groovy Cartoon Movie in 2013.
