= Jason Mewes =

American actor (born 1974)

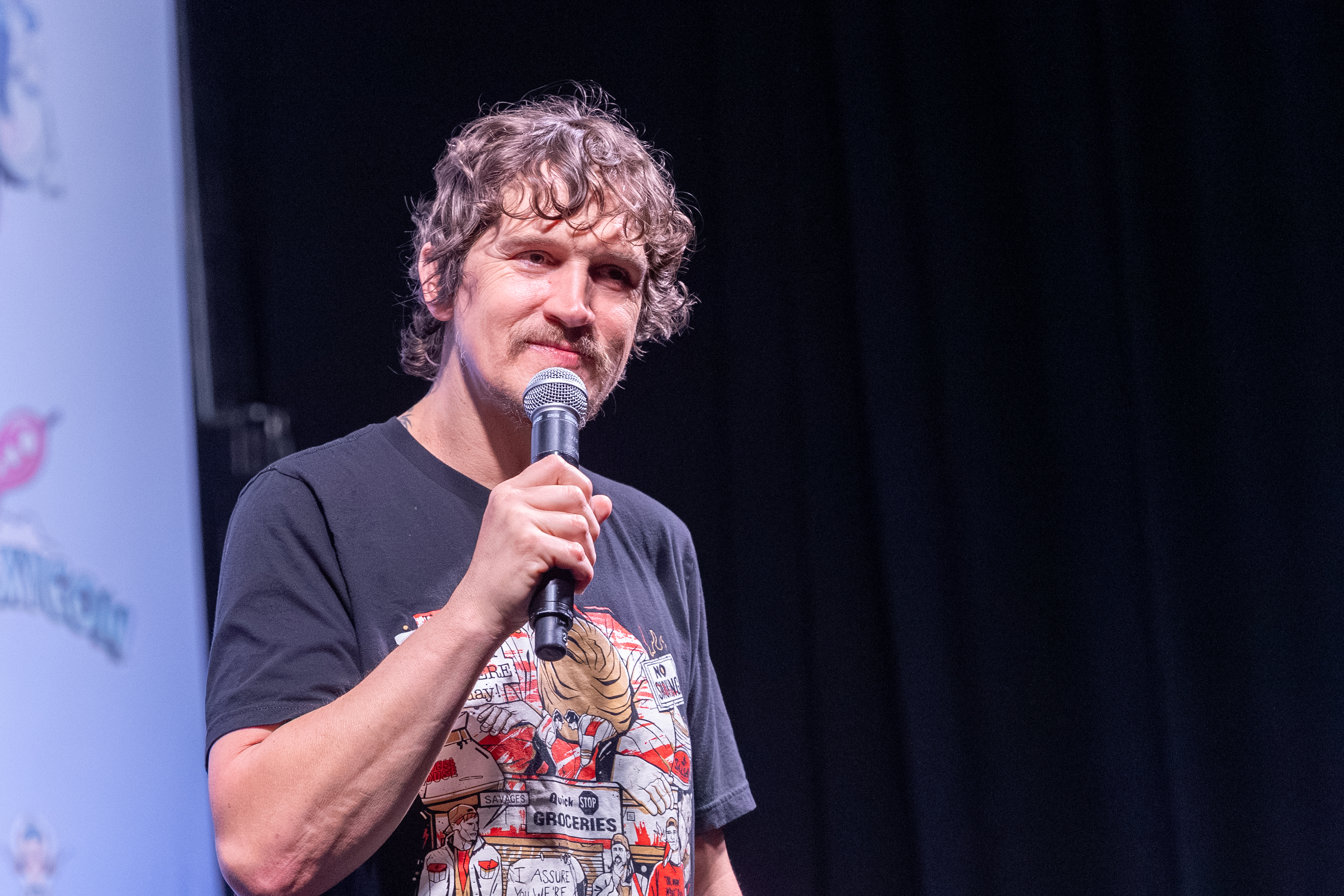
- Mewes at GalaxyCon Richmond in 2026
- Born: Jason Edward Mewes; June 12, 1974 (age 52); Highlands, New Jersey, U.S.
- Occupations: Actor; comedian; film producer; MC
- Years active: 1994–present
- Spouse: Jordan Monsanto (m. 2009)
- Children: 2

Jason Edward Mewes (born June 12, 1974) is an American actor, comedian, film producer, and podcaster. He is best known for playing Jay, the vocal half of the duo Jay and Silent Bob, in longtime friend Kevin Smith's View Askewniverse franchise.

== Early life ==
Mewes was born on June 12, 1974, in Highlands, New Jersey, and grew up in a working-class neighborhood. He never knew his father, and his mother was an ex-con and a drug addict. Relates Mewes: "She used to check into hotels and take TVs and sell them... I guess it really ain't funny, but it's weird because it was so fucked up... She used to steal mail. I used to drive around with her and she'd pull up and make me reach into mailboxes. It really wasn't pleasant." Although this exposure to drugs at first served to make him averse to them, he eventually began using them after graduating from Henry Hudson Regional High School.

His best friend was future filmmaker Kevin Smith, who described Mewes this way: "[Jason]'s the kind of dude you know for five minutes and he whips his cock out. I was like, somebody should put this dude in a movie. I just wanted to see if anybody outside our group of friends finds him as funny as I do."

== Career ==
While working toward a career in roofing, Mewes made his film debut in Smith's 1994 film Clerks as Jay. The film was a success, resulting in Mewes becoming closely identified with the role, which he also played in Mallrats (1995), Chasing Amy (1997), Dogma (1999), Jay and Silent Bob Strike Back (2001), and Clerks II (2006). He supplied Jay's voice in the short-lived Clerks: The Animated Series. He, along with Kevin Smith, performed in the films Scream 3 (2000) and Bottoms Up (2006); they appeared on the Canadian television series Degrassi: The Next Generation, in two episodes of a three-part story arc in which he and Smith film a new addition to Smith's View Askew films titled Jay and Silent Bob Go Canadian, Eh? at Degrassi Community School. Mewes, Smith, and Degrassi star Stacie Mistysyn made the cover of the January 29, 2005, issue of Canadian TV Guide.

In 1998, he starred as "Gary Lamb – Ground Activist" in a series of Nike commercials directed by Smith. From 2010 to 2012, Mewes was cast as "Jimmy the Janitor" for 26 episodes of the Canadian television series Todd and the Book of Pure Evil.

Mewes starred in the horror film Breath of Hate (2015), where he played a romantic love interest to a dysfunctional escort. Mewes co-starred in Smith's 2008 film Zack and Miri Make a Porno, in which Mewes, in a scene near the end of the film, appears fully nude.

Mewes co-hosts a weekly podcast with Smith called Jay & Silent Bob Get Old in which Mewes discusses his former drug addiction issues.

Mewes is co-executive producer on Smith's Hulu-exclusive series Spoilers with Kevin Smith.

Mewes co-produced the 2013 animated movie Jay & Silent Bob's Super Groovy Cartoon Movie with his wife Jordan Monsanto, which was based on the Bluntman and Chronic comic book that Smith wrote as a companion piece to 2001's Jay and Silent Bob Strike Back.

Mewes starred in episode 3 of the sixth season of Hawaii Five-0 as Eddie Brooks.

Mewes' directorial debut, Madness in the Method, in which he also starred, premiered August 2, 2019, in the U.S.

== Personal life ==
Mewes married Jordan Monsanto in a civil ceremony on January 30, 2009, with a larger wedding planned later that May. Their daughter was born in April 2015. Their son was born in February 2023.

=== Substance abuse ===
Mewes has openly talked about his struggles with substance abuse, which began in his early 20s. He first began using heroin shortly after appearing in Mallrats and was soon addicted; he was under the influence while filming Chasing Amy and Dogma. Kevin Smith entered Mewes into the first of a series of drug rehabilitation clinics in 1997 after noticing Mewes would randomly fall asleep, which he initially attributed to narcolepsy. Mewes sobered up until about a week into the Dogma shoot, when he learned he could pass his urine tests by abstaining from drugs for three days beforehand and then using drugs the rest of the week. In another attempt to get clean, Mewes moved in with his mother, who gave him OxyContin to ease the withdrawal symptoms. Mewes's mother died in 2002 of AIDS related complications. She contracted HIV from sharing needles.

In 1999, Mewes was arrested in New Jersey for heroin possession. His probation sentence included community service, drug counseling, and regular court appearances in New Jersey. In late 2001, after he failed to make a court appearance, a warrant was issued for his arrest. Smith had taken Mewes in to live with him and his wife, Jennifer Schwalbach Smith, but evicted him after catching him using drugs again. During this period, Mewes stole Smith's ATM card, spent $1,100 of Smith's money, and had heroin shipped to the hotel where a press junket for Jay and Silent Bob Strike Back was being held. Smith had Mewes check into various rehab facilities, including Promises in Malibu, where his visit coincided with frequent costar Ben Affleck's stay for alcoholism. These attempts were unsuccessful for Mewes, whose problem was so severe that Smith was unable to give him a part in 2004's Jersey Girl.

Mewes continued to use drugs, and has related that he decided to turn himself in and get help after waking up on Christmas morning in 2002 to find that he had started a fire after falling asleep near a lit candle while on heroin. Estranged from Smith, Mewes returned to New Jersey, and on April 1, 2003, he surrendered himself at a Freehold, New Jersey, court and pleaded guilty to probation violation charges. He was ordered to enter a six-month rehab program. In a July 2006 interview, he reported that he was sober, and harbored no urges to drink or use drugs. He relapsed in 2009 after having surgery.

To help Mewes maintain his sobriety, Smith created the Jay & Silent Bob Get Old podcast as a "weekly intervention" to let Mewes talk through his history of substance abuse. In a May 2014 Reddit Q&A thread with fans, Mewes stated that he had been sober since July 1, 2010.

== Filmography ==
=== Television and movies ===
Key
†	Denotes works that have not yet been released

Year	Film	Role	Notes
1994	Clerks	Jay	
1995	Mallrats	Jay	
1996	Drawing Flies	Az	
1997	Chasing Amy	Jay	
1999	Dogma	Jay	
1999	Tail Lights Fade		Uncredited
1999	The Blair Clown Project	Witness #3	
1999	Spilt Milk		
2000–2002	Clerks: The Animated Series	Jay	6 episodes
2000	Scream 3	Jay	Cameo
2000	Vulgar	Tuott the Basehead	
2001	Jay and Silent Bob Strike Back	Jay	
2002	R.S.V.P.	Terry	
2002	High Times' Potluck	Guy	
2002	Hot Rush		
2003	Pauly Shore Is Dead	Jay the MC	As Jay Mewes
2004	Powder: Up Here	Evil Villain	
2005	Degrassi: The Next Generation	Himself	4 episodes
2005	My Big Fat Independent Movie	Answering Machine	Voice
2005	The Pleasure Drivers	Counter Monkey	
2006	Clerks II	Jay	
2006	Feast	Edgy Cat/Jason Mewes	
2006	National Lampoon's TV: The Movie	Carrie	
2006	Bottoms Up	Owen Peadman	
2006	Jack's Law	Bobby Mewes	
2007	Netherbeast Incorporated	Waxy Dan	
2007	Gone Baby Gone		"Thanks" during the end credits
2007	The Tripper	Joey	
2008	Bitten	Jack	Video
2008	Zack and Miri Make a Porno	Lester	
2008	Tattoos: A Scarred History	Himself	
2008	Fanboys	Himself	Cameo
2009	Tom Cool		
2009	Midgets vs. Mascots	Jason	Uncredited
2009	Shoot the Hero	Nate	
2009	Mitch and Stu's Quest	Stu	
2009	The Science of Cool	Coach Cambria	
2009	Degrassi Goes Hollywood	Himself	TV movie
2010–2012	Todd and the Book of Pure Evil	Jimmy the Janitor	Main role
2010	Repo	T.J.	
2010	Noah's Ark: The New Beginning	Ham	Voice
2010	Breath of Hate	Ned	
2010	Big Money Rustlas	Bucky	
2010	The Last Godfather	Vinnie	
2011	Silent But Deadly	Thomas Capper	
2012	Cousin Sarah	Anton	
2012	Spoilers with Kevin Smith	Himself	Also co-executive producer
2012	Noobz	Andy Clifton	
2012	The Newest Pledge	Professor Street	
2013	Jay & Silent Bob's Super Groovy Cartoon Movie!	Jay	Voice, also producer
2013	Vigilante Diaries	Mike Hanover	Web series, 2 episodes, also producer
2014	Devil's Tower	Sid	
2014	Randal's Monday	Jay Dealer	
2015	The Last House	Ned	
2015	Scooby-Doo! and Kiss: Rock and Roll Mystery	Worker #1	Voice
2015	Hawaii Five-0	Eddie Brooks	1 episode
2015–2016	Triptank	Jimmy; Caller	Voice, 2 episodes
2016–2018	The Flash	Humvee Guy; Jay the Security Guard	2 episodes
2016	Bling	Kit	Voice
2016	Shooting Clerks	Wes Jameson	
2016	Yoga Hosers	Rogue Cop	Also producer
2016	Vigilante Diaries	Mike Hanover	
2016	Hollyweed	Rolo	
2018	Aah! Roach!	Deek	
2018	Weight	Bogart	
2019	Madness in the Method	Jay	Also director
2019	Jay and Silent Bob Reboot	Jay	
2021, 2024	Masters of the Universe: Revelation	Stinkor, Baddrah	Voice; 2 episodes
2022	KillRoy Was Here		
2022	Clerks III	Jay	
2024	The 4:30 Movie	A John	
2025	Killing Mary Sue	Ed Harper	
2025	The Napa Boys	Jay	
2025	Paradise Records	Jay	
2026	Murdoch Mysteries	'Slippery' Bill Watson	Episodes: "Tow Tags" & "The Maltese Falconer"
2026	Big City Greens	Ricky	Voice; Episode: "Chicken Coop"

=== Video games ===
Year	Game	Role	Notes
2006	Scarface: The World Is Yours	Nat - Small Supplier	Voice
2017	Call of Duty: Infinite Warfare	Himself	Voice; part of "Rave in the Redwoods" Zombies map
2020	Fallout 76	Mort	Wastelanders expansion
2025	Call of Duty: Black Ops 6	Jay	Playable character in multiplayer modes
2026	Jay and Silent Bob: Chronic Blunt Punch	Jay	Voice; Playable character

=== Music videos ===
Year	Title	Artist	Notes
1994	"Can't Even Tell"	Soul Asylum	Jay
1995	"Build Me Up Buttercup"	The Goops	Jay
2001	"Because I Got High"	Afroman	Jay
2001	"Kick Some Ass"	Stroke 9	Jay
2013	"Problem"	Nova Rockafeller	Guy at party
2018	"I'm Upset"	Drake	Jay
2023	"Highlife"	Logic	Jay
