= Ralph Garman =

American actor

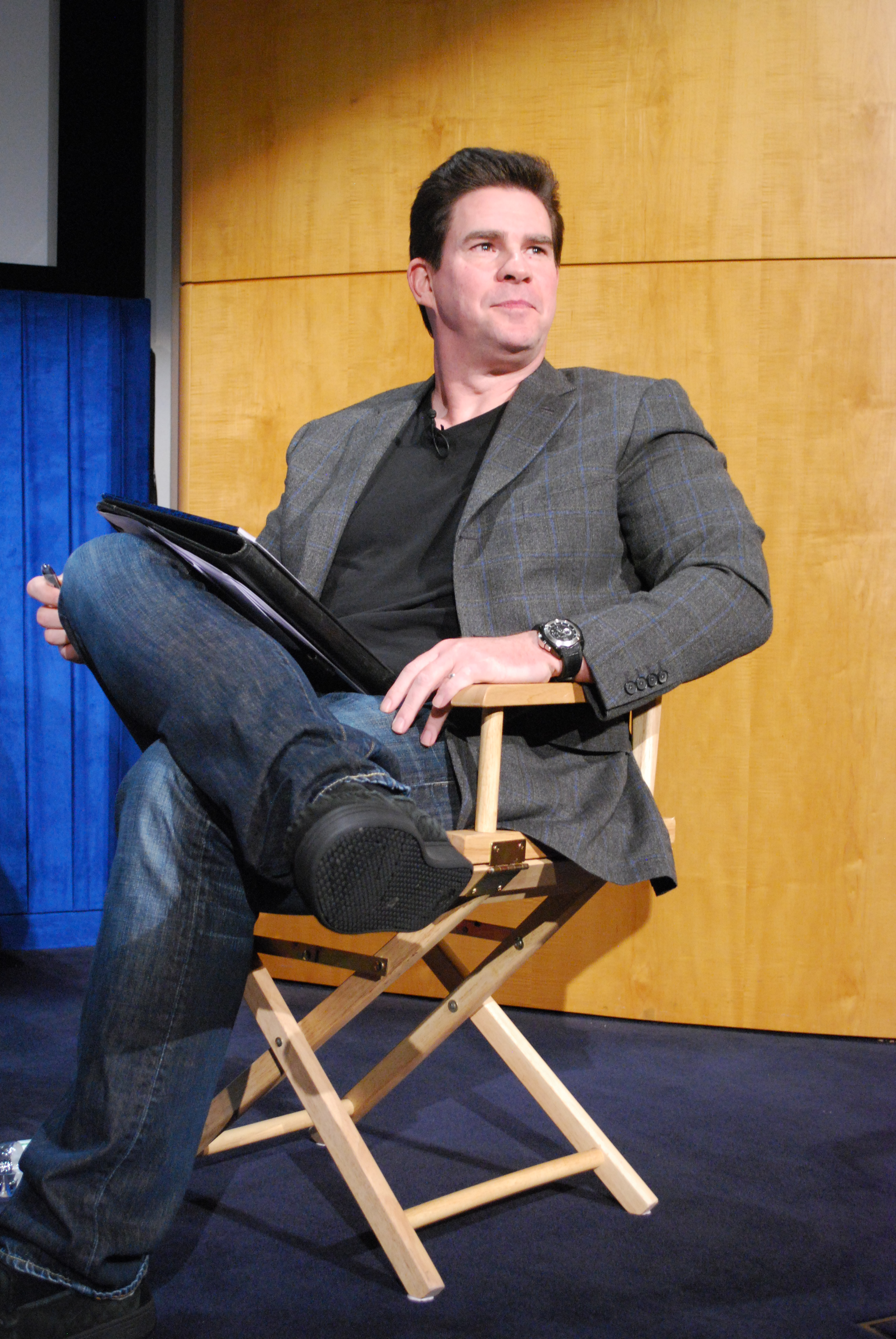
- Born: Ralph Joseph Garman Jr. Philadelphia, Pennsylvania, United States
- Occupations: Actor; journalist
- Years active: 1987–present
- Spouse: Kari Watson (m. 2005; div. 2020) Jennifer Stewart (m. 2024)
- Children: 2 (son deceased)

Ralph Garman (born November 17) is an American actor and journalist best known as the host of The Joe Schmo Show, for his voice work on the Fox animated series Family Guy, former entertainment reporter and impressionist for the Kevin and Bean morning show on Los Angeles radio station KROQ-FM, and his podcast with co-host Kevin Smith, Hollywood Babble-On. Garman can currently be heard on his daily podcast, "The Ralph Report" on the Patreon platform.

== Early life ==
Garman was born in Philadelphia, Pennsylvania, and graduated from Abraham Lincoln High School and then La Salle University with a Bachelor of Arts degree in communication arts.

== Career ==
He was a contestant on the game show Scrabble in 1993. Garman was a regular reporter on the long-running Playboy TV series Sexcetera, which explored avant-garde sexuality in a lighthearted manner. He hosted The Joe Schmo Show, and was an entertainment reporter and impressionist for the Kevin and Bean morning show on Los Angeles radio station KROQ-FM. Garman was hired to work on the show through Jimmy Kimmel, at the time the sports reporter on the show, who had received a recommendation to hire him through former roommate Adam Carolla. His voice was heard over the radio by a Family Guy casting director, who requested him to audition for a part on Fox animated series. He also hosts the Hollywood Babble-On podcast with Kevin Smith on SModcast.com where he utilizes various impressions in a series of ongoing segments that deliver news and satire centered around Hollywood, celebrities, and pop culture.

Garman's last Kevin and Bean show was suddenly announced on November 30, 2017. He was let go from his long-time position at KROQ due to downsizing by new management. On a wave of support from local, national, and international fans (accumulated from his work on both KROQ & Hollywood Babble-On) Garman has since launched his own new daily podcast called The Ralph Report with his 'vice' host Eddie Pence (named vice host since his last name is the same as the then US Vice President Mike Pence at the time the podcast was created.) The Ralph Report also featured Steve Ashton as the U.K. Correspondent on Wednesdays and Fridays. Ashton died in early 2023. This endeavor is made through Patreon. He now hosts this podcast full-time, as well as co-hosting Hollywood Babble-On. With Garman no longer tied to KROQ, Hollywood Babble-On has been freed up to tour more than it was able to in earlier years.

=== Comics ===
In 2014, Kevin Smith and Garman wrote a Batman '66 crossover featuring Batman and Green Hornet titled Batman 66 Meets the Green Hornet.

== Personal life ==
Garman married Kari Watson in April 2005. Watson gave birth to the couple's premature twins, Lincoln and Olivia, on March 26, 2010. Lincoln acquired an illness shortly after birth and died. Olivia remained in the neonatal intensive care unit for two months before coming home. Garman's mother died on November 13, 2012, from a sudden heart attack and kidney failure. On January 2, 2020, Garman announced on Twitter that his father had died of brain cancer earlier that morning. In March of that year, both on Twitter and during an episode #356 of the Hollywood Babble-On podcast (which Garman hosts with filmmaker Kevin Smith), he announced that he and his wife Kari were in the midst of a divorce, but that they were still on good terms. Their divorce was finalized later that year. On September 14, 2024, Garman married Jennifer Stewart, at a wedding officiated by Kevin Smith.

== Filmography ==
=== Film ===
Year	Film	Role	Notes
1988	What Price Victory		
1997	Chimp Lips Theater		Voice
1998	Gotcha		Voice
2000	Digimon: The Movie	Newsman	Voice
2004	Save Virgil	Plumber	
2005	Stewie Griffin: The Untold Story		Voice
2005	Two for the Money	Reggie	
2006	The Other Mall	Bil Travis	
2006	Deceit	Police Sargeant	
2008	Eagle Eye	Newscaster	
2009	This Monday	Steve	
2010	Sharktopus	Captain Jack	
2011	Red State	Caleb	
2012	Ted	Steve Bennett	
2013	Jay & Silent Bob's Super Groovy Cartoon Movie	Dick Head	Voice
2014	Tusk	Detective Frank Garmin	
2014	A Million Ways to Die in the West	Dan	
2015	Ted 2	Stormtrooper	
2016	Yoga Hosers	Andronicus Arcane	
2017	The Lego Batman Movie	Reporter #2	Voice
2017	Once Upon a Time in Venice	Bum	Scene cut from film
2019	Lego DC Batman: Family Matters	Wizard	Voice
2019	Jay and Silent Bob Reboot	Ted Underhill	
2020	Lego DC Shazam! Magic and Monsters	Wizard	Voice
2022	KillRoy Was Here	Priest	
2022	Clerks III	Auditioner	Cameo
2022	Wrong Reasons	Detective Charles Dobson	1st lead role in film
2024	The 4:30 Movie	Mad Brad Woodland	

=== Television ===
Year	Title	Role	Notes
1999	Charmed	DJ	Episode: "She's a Man, Baby, a Man!; The Devil's Music"
2001–present	Family Guy	Various	Voice, 236 episodes
2003	The Joe Schmo Show	Himself/host	10 episodes
2004	Joe Schmo Show 2	Derek Newcastle/Host	9 episodes
2005–present	American Dad!	Hazmat Guy, Police Officer, additional voices	5 episodes
2006	20 to 1	Himself	Episode: "Hoaxes, Cheats and Liars"
2006	Celebrity Deathmatch	Adam West	Voice, episode: "When Animals Attack"
2008–2009	10 Items or Less	Charles Kliphouse	3 episodes
2008–2009	Seth MacFarlane's Cavalcade of Cartoon Comedy	Various	Voice, 2 episodes
2009	The Cleveland Show	Chandler, Child Service Representative	Voice, episode: "The One About Friends"
2009	Born Hye: The Armenian Comedian Story	Himself	
2009	Titan Maximum	Bud Freewell	Episode: "One Billion Dead Grandparents"
2011	House M.D.	Bobby	Episode: "Transplant"
2011–2012	Mad	Caesar, Donald Chimp, Al Pacino, Elongated Man	Voice, 2 episodes
2012	Bones	Morgan Donnelly (dead guy)	Episode: "The But in the Joke"
2013	The Joe Schmo Show: The Full Bounty	Jake Montrose "The Bounty Hunter"/Host	10 episodes
2014	Avengers Assemble	Mojo	Voice, episode: "Mojo World"
2014	Maron	Pete	Voice, episode: "Mouth Cancer Gig"
2015	Agent Carter	Radio announcer	2 episodes
2015	Lavalantula	Pirate Jack	Television film
2016–2019	Robot Chicken	Roger Radcliffe, Liam Neeson, Donald Trump, Chip Gaines	Voice, 3 episodes
2017	The Orville	Kanoot	Episode: "Cupid's Dagger"
2018	Elena of Avalor	Torpe	Voice, episode: "The Tides of Change"
2020–2021	Animaniacs	Shipmate, Uptight Announcer, Conductor	Voice, 2 episodes
2021; 2024	Masters of the Universe: Revelation	Fisto, Rio Blast	Voice, 2 episodes
