= Kevin Smith filmography =

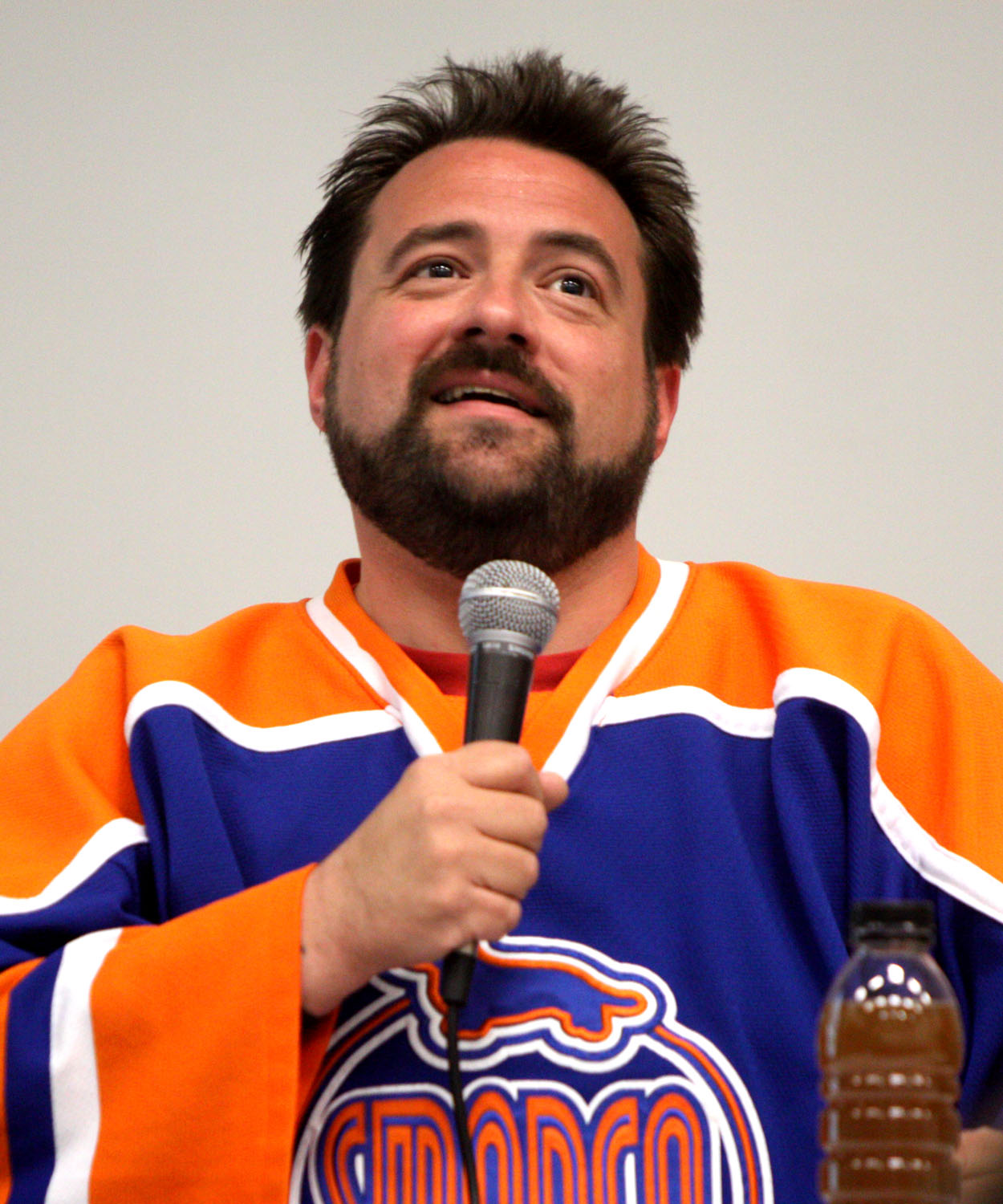
Kevin Smith speaking at VidCon 2012.

Kevin Smith is an American screenwriter, actor, film producer, and director. He came to prominence with the low-budget comedy Clerks (1994), in which he appeared as the character Silent Bob.

His first several films were mostly set in his home state of New Jersey, and while not strictly sequential, they frequently feature crossover plot elements, character references, and a shared canon described by fans as the "View Askewniverse"—named after his production company View Askew Productions, which he co-founded with Scott Mosier.

Smith also directed and produced films such as the buddy cop action comedy Cop Out, as well as the thriller Red State. Outside of film, Smith has worked in various capacities on several television series.

Smith also participates in Q&A sessions that have routinely been filmed for DVD release, beginning with An Evening with Kevin Smith.

== Film ==
=== Feature film ===
Year	Title	Credited as			Notes
Year	Title	Director	Writer	Editor	Notes
1994	Clerks	Yes	Yes	Yes	Also producer
1995	Mallrats	Yes	Yes	No	
1997	Chasing Amy	Yes	Yes	Yes	
1999	Dogma	Yes	Yes	Yes	Also puppeteer
2001	Jay and Silent Bob Strike Back	Yes	Yes	Yes	
2004	Jersey Girl	Yes	Yes	Yes	
2006	Clerks II	Yes	Yes	Yes	
2008	Zack and Miri Make a Porno	Yes	Yes	Yes	
2010	Cop Out	Yes	No	Yes	
2011	Red State	Yes	Yes	Yes	
2013	Jay & Silent Bob's Super Groovy Cartoon Movie!	No	Yes	No	
2014	Tusk	Yes	Yes	Yes	
2016	Yoga Hosers	Yes	Yes	Yes	
2019	Jay and Silent Bob Reboot	Yes	Yes	Yes	
2022	KillRoy Was Here	Yes	Yes	No	
2022	Clerks III	Yes	Yes	Yes	
2024	The 4:30 Movie	Yes	Yes	Yes	

=== Short film ===
Year	Title	Credited as				Notes
Year	Title	Director	Writer	Producer	Editor	Notes
1992	Mae Day: The Crumbling of a Documentary	Yes	Yes	Yes	Yes	Also actor Role: Director/Himself; Vancouver Film School project
2002	The Flying Car	Yes	Yes	Yes	No	
2016	Halloween	Yes	Yes	No	Yes	Segment of Holidays
2026	Weed Love To	Yes	Yes	No	No	Part of series 15 Second Film

=== Additional writing credits ===
Year	Title	Notes
1997	Overnight Delivery	Uncredited rewrite, Smith said that the only scene that used his dialogue was the opening scene, which includes a reference to longtime Smith friend Bryan Johnson.
2000	Coyote Ugly	Uncredited rewrite, Smith said in Evening Harder that only one of his lines remains in the final film.
2007	Live Free or Die Hard	Uncredited rewrite, his scene only
2009	Fanboys	His scene only
2011	Smodimations 2-D	An hour long film retelling stories from his Podcast

=== Executive producer ===
Year	Title	Notes
1996	Drawing Flies	Producer
1997	A Better Place	
1997	Good Will Hunting	Co-executive producer
1999	Tail Lights Fade	Uncredited
1999	Big Helium Dog	
2000	Vulgar	
2005	Reel Paradise	
2006	Small Town Gay Bar	
2010	Bear Nation	
2022	Wrong Reasons	
2023	Shooting Clerks	
2025	Paradise Records	Also editor

=== Acting roles ===
Year	Title	Role	Notes
1994	Clerks	Silent Bob	
1995	Mallrats	Silent Bob	
1996	Drawing Flies	Silent Bob/Himself	Cameo
1997	Chasing Amy	Silent Bob	
1999	Big Helium Dog	Director	
1999	Dogma	Silent Bob	
2000	Scream 3	Silent Bob	Cameo
2000	Vulgar	Martan Ingram	
2001	Jay and Silent Bob Strike Back	Silent Bob	
2001	The Fast and the Furious	KJ Truck Driver	Cameo
2002	Now You Know	Married guy	Cameo
2002	Stan Lee's Mutants, Monsters & Marvels	Himself	Documentary
2003	Daredevil	Jack Kirby	Cameo
2006	Doogal	Moose	Voice
2006	Bottoms Up	Rusty #2	Cameo
2006	Southland Tales	Simon Theory	
2006	Catch and Release	Sam	
2006	Clerks II	Silent Bob	
2007	Superman: Doomsday	Grumpy Man	Voice, direct-to-video
2007	TMNT	Diner Cook	Voice
2007	Live Free or Die Hard	Frederick "Warlock" Kaludis	
2009	Fanboys	Guy at gas station	Cameo
2010	4.3.2.1.	"Big" Larry	
2011	Red State	Prisoner	Voice cameo
2012	For a Good Time, Call...	Cabbie	Cameo
2013	Jay & Silent Bob's Super Groovy Cartoon Movie!	Silent Bob/Himself	Voice
2015	The Death of "Superman Lives": What Happened?	Himself	Documentary
2015	Scooby-Doo! and Kiss: Rock and Roll Mystery	Worker #2	Voice, cameo
2015	Star Wars: The Force Awakens	Stormtrooper	Voice, cameo
2016	Yoga Hosers	Bratzi	
2017	Teen Titans: The Judas Contract	Himself	Voice, cameo
2017	The Disaster Artist	Himself	Cameo
2017	Another WolfCop	Mayor Bubba	Uncredited
2019	Madness in the Method	Himself	
2019	Star Wars: The Rise of Skywalker	Commander	Cameo
2019	Jay and Silent Bob Reboot	Silent Bob/Himself	
2019	Shooting Clerks	Larkin Eve	Cameo
2020	Max Reload and the Nether Blasters	Chuck	
2022	Clerks III	Silent Bob	
2022	Wrong Reasons	Kevin einer anderen Welt	
2025	The Napa Boys	Silent Bob	

== Q&A/stand-up releases ==
Year	Title	Notes
2002	An Evening with Kevin Smith	Question and Answer sessions that Smith held with his fans at various American colleges in 2001/2002. Released on DVD in 2002.
2006	An Evening with Kevin Smith 2: Evening Harder	Taken from Kevin's Q&As at Roy Thomson Hall in Toronto and the Criterion Theatre in London. The DVD was released on November 28, 2006.
2008	Sold Out: A Threevening with Kevin Smith	Q&A performance on August 2, 2007 (Smith's 37th birthday) in front of a sold-out crowd at the Count Basie Theatre in Red Bank, New Jersey. The DVD was released on October 21, 2008.
2010	Kevin Smith: Too Fat for 40	The fourth installment of Kevin Smith's Q&A series which was broadcast on Epix on October 23, 2010. Filmed at Count Basie Theatre in Red Bank, New Jersey. Released on DVD & Blu-ray on October 18, 2011
2012	Kevin Smith: Burn In Hell	A second Epix broadcast and fifth installment of Kevin Smith's Q&A series filmed live at the Paramount Theater in Austin, Texas September 27, 2011. The original performance ran for roughly 4 hours but was edited down to about 90 minutes. Officially released February 11, 2012.
2018	Kevin Smith: Silent But Deadly	Stand-up special filmed an hour before Smith had his near-fatal heart attack in 2018

== Jay and Silent Bob Podcast releases ==
Year	Title	Notes
2012	Jay and Silent Bob Get Old: Tea Bagging in the UK	Released on 14 August 2012. Three shows in London, Manchester and Edinburgh.
2012	Jay and Silent Bob Go Down Under	Released on 30 November 2012. Three shows in Adelaide, Melbourne and Sydney.
2013	Jay and Silent Bob Get Irish: The Swearing O' the Green	Released on 12 March 2013. Two shows in Dublin.

== Television ==
=== Production credits ===
Year	Title	Credited as				Notes
Year	Title	Director	Writer	Executive Producer	Creator	Notes
2000	Clerks: The Animated Series	No	Yes	Yes	Yes	
2001	The Concert for New York City	Yes	Yes	No	No	Segment: "Why I Love New #*$%!&@ York"
2006	Sucks Less with Kevin Smith	No	Yes	Yes	Yes	
2007	Reaper	Yes	No	Yes	No	Directed episode: "Pilot" also consultant
2012–2014	Spoilers with Kevin Smith	No	No	Yes	Yes	
2012–2018	Comic Book Men	No	No	Yes	Yes	
2016	Hollyweed	Yes	Yes	Yes	Yes	Pilot
2016–2018	The Flash	Yes	No	No	No	3 episodes
2017–2018	Supergirl	Yes	No	No	No	4 episodes
2017–2019	The Goldbergs	Yes	No	No	No	3 episodes
2021–2024	Masters of the Universe: Revelation	No	Yes	Yes	Yes	

=== Acting and other television appearances ===
Year	Title	Role	Notes
1998	Space Ghost Coast to Coast	Himself	Episode: "Rio Ghosto"
2000	Law & Order	Tony's wife's nephew	Episode: "Black, White and Blue"
2000	Clerks: The Animated Series	Silent Bob	Voice, 6 episodes
2003	Duck Dodgers	Hal Jordan	Voice, episode: "The Green Loontern"
2004	Yes, Dear	Himself/Silent Bob	Episode: "The Premiere"
2004	Mad TV	Himself	1 episode
2005	Veronica Mars	Duane Anders	Episode: "Driver Ed"
2005	Joey	Himself	Episode: "Joey and the Big Break: Part 2"
2005–2006	Degrassi: The Next Generation	Himself / Silent Bob	5 episodes
2006	Sucks Less with Kevin Smith	Himself (host)	6 episodes
2007	Reaper	Jewish Guy	Uncredited voice, episode: "Pilot"
2009	Degrassi Goes Hollywood	Himself	Television film
2010	Phineas and Ferb	Clive Addison	Voice, episode: "Nerds of a Feather"
2012–2014	Spoilers with Kevin Smith	Himself (host)	20 episodes
2012–2018	Comic Book Men	Himself (co-host)	96 episodes
2013–2014	The Mindy Project	Himself	2 episodes
2014–2016	@midnight	Himself (panelist)	6 episodes
2014	Comedy Bang! Bang!	Himself	Episode: "Kevin Smith Wears a Hockey Jersey & Jean Shorts"
2015, 2019	The Big Bang Theory	Himself	2 episodes
2016	DC Films Presents: The Dawn of the Justice League	Himself (co-host)	Television special
2016	Geeking Out	Himself (co-host)	9 episodes, also executive producer
2016	Ask the StoryBots	Super Mega Awesome Ultra Guy	Episode: "How Do Airplanes Fly?"
2017	Bunnicula	Alien #2	Voice, episode: "Indistinguishable from Magic"
2017	Nirvanna the Band the Show	Himself	Episode: "The Big Time"
2017	Speechless	Himself	Episode: "S-t-Star W-Wars"
2018	Explained	Himself (narrator)	Episode: "Weed"
2018	The Flash	Bob the Security Guard	Episode: "Null and Annoyed"
2019	Crisis Aftermath	Himself (host)	2 episodes
2020	The Simpsons	Himself	Voice, episode: "Highway to Well"
2020	The George Lucas Talk Show	Himself	Episode: "Askew of the Views"
2020	Impractical Jokers	Silent Bob	Episode: "Hollywood"
2021–2022	Masters of the Universe: Revelation	Pigboy, Goatman, Tri-Klops	Voice, 3 episodes
2022	The Boys Presents: Diabolical	Boobie Face	Voice, episode: "An Animated Short Where Pissed-Off Supes Kill Their Parents"
2022–2023	StoryBots: Answer Time	Super Mega Awesome Ultra Guy	5 episodes
2023	The Muppets Mayhem	Himself	Episode: "Track 7: Eight Days a Week"
2024	That '90s Show	Sonny	3 episodes
2024	LEGO Marvel Avengers: Mission Demolition	Terrax	Voice, Disney+ special
2026	Big City Greens	Dave	Voice, Episode: "Chicken Coop"

== Music videos ==
Year	Title	Artist	Notes
1994	"Can't Even Tell"	Soul Asylum	Silent Bob (Also Director)
1995	"Build Me Up Buttercup"	The Goops	Silent Bob (Also Director)
2001	"Because I Got High"	Afroman	Silent Bob
2001	"Kick Some Ass"	Stroke 9	Silent Bob
2013	"Problem"	Nova Rockafeller	Guy at party
2018	"I'm Upset"	Drake	Silent Bob
2023	“Highlife”	Logic	Silent Bob (Also Director)
2025	"Childlike Things"	FKA Twigs	Executive

== Web ==
Year	Title	Role	Notes
2016	"Interns of F.I.E.L.D."	Manos	Ep. 8
2019	"Relics and Rarities"	Self/Sam Hayne	Ep. 5: "The Case of the Black Onyx"
2017–2020	"The IMDb Studio at Sundance"	Self – Interviewer	
2020–2021	Movie Trivia Schmoedown	Self – Kevin "Good Enough" Smith	
2024	Mojito with Majeeto	Self	Ep. 5

== Video games ==
Year	Title	Role	Notes
2014	Lego Batman 3: Beyond Gotham	Himself	Video game
2017	Call of Duty: Infinite Warfare	Himself	Video game, part of "Rave in the Redwoods" Zombies downloadable content map
2025	Call of Duty: Black Ops 6	Silent Bob	Video game, part of Season 3 Tracer Pack
2026	Jay and Silent Bob: Chronic Blunt Punch	Silent Bob	Video game

== Audio drama ==
Year	Title	Role	Author	Production company	Notes
2021	The Sandman: Act II	Mervyn Pumpkinhead	Neil Gaiman, Dirk Maggs	Audible	

== See also ==
- Kevin Smith's unrealized projects

== Notes ==
- "Kevin Smith Filmography". Movies & TV Dept. The New York Times. 2007. Archived from the original on November 21, 2007.
