= View Askew Productions =

American film and television production company

View Askew Productions, Inc.
- Company logo, featuring Jay and Silent Bob depicted in their designs from Clerks: The Animated Series
- Type: Film/television production company
- Industry: Television series, motion pictures
- Genre: Comedy
- Founded: February 3, 1994; 32 years ago
- Founders: Kevin Smith; Scott Mosier
- Headquarters: 10 Mechanic St. Ste. #120, Red Bank, New Jersey, U.S.

View Askew Productions, Inc. is an American film and television production company founded by Kevin Smith and Scott Mosier in 1994. Actors Ben Affleck, Jeff Anderson, Matt Damon, Chris Rock, Walter Flanagan, Bryan Johnson, Jason Lee, Jason Mewes, Brian O'Halloran and Ethan Suplee are people that frequently appear in projects under the View Askew banner.

== History ==
Smith and Mosier founded the company in 1994 to produce their first film, Clerks, which was the first film in what is now known as the View Askewniverse. After the film became a success View Askew obtained a larger budget and produced Mallrats in 1995, which underperformed critically and commercially but found success after being released on home video. It was followed by 1997's Chasing Amy and 1999's Dogma.

In 2000, View Askew briefly produced Clerks: The Animated Series, a short-lived animated series based on Clerks, which only aired six episodes. They released Jay and Silent Bob Strike Back, which starred Smith and Jason Mewes as their characters Jay and Silent Bob. It was followed by the first non-Askewniverse film, Jersey Girl, which featured many of Smith's frequent cast members.

Two years after Jersey Girl, View Askew released Clerks II, the first true sequel to a previous Smith film, which features the main characters of the film Clerks continuing ten years later. This film was followed by the second non-Askewniverse film, Zack and Miri Make a Porno.

The company has released several of Smith's non-fiction works, such as his four question and answer DVDs, An Evening With Kevin Smith in 2002, An Evening With Kevin Smith 2: Evening Harder in 2006, Sold Out: A Threevening with Kevin Smith in 2008 and Kevin Smith: Too Fat for 40 in 2011. It has produced Sucks Less with Kevin Smith, a show which features (at least) three UCLA students who are enrolled in a class about cinematography in which Smith is their teacher.

In addition to the various Smith-directed films, the company has produced movies for other directors including Malcolm Ingram's Drawing Flies and Small Town Gay Bar, Bryan Johnson's Vulgar, Vincent Pereira's A Better Place, and Brian Lynch's Big Helium Dog.

The company's logo was originally a smiling clown with a 5 o' clock shadow dressed in women's lingerie and platform pumps, named "Vulgar" which gained controversy due to its content and was later changed to a cartoon Jay and Silent Bob with film equipment. In 2022, with the release of Clerks III, the logo changed again, this time to Vulgar's face.

View Askew Productions run a 2005 Movies Askew short film festival. The 12 finalists of 2005 were screened at a gala event in Hollywood, California on September 6, 2006. The audience included a panel of celebrity judges with the likes of Jason Mewes, Scott Mosier and Donnie Darko director Richard Kelly. A shortened 24-minute version of Up Syndrome won the grand prize at the festival.

== Films ==
- Clerks (1994)
- Mallrats (1995)
- Drawing Flies (1996)
- Chasing Amy (1997)
- A Better Place (1997)
- Big Helium Dog (1999)
- Dogma (1999)
- Vulgar (2000)
- Jay and Silent Bob Strike Back (2001)
- Jersey Girl (2004)
- Oh, What a Lovely Tea Party (2004)
- Clerks II (2006)
- Back to the Well: Clerks II (2006)
- Small Town Gay Bar (2006)
- Zack and Miri Make a Porno (2008)
- Bear Nation (2010)
- Jay & Silent Bob's Super Groovy Cartoon Movie! (2013)
- Jay and Silent Bob Reboot (2019)
- KillRoy Was Here (2022)
- Clerks III (2022)
- The 4:30 Movie (2024)

== Television shows ==
- Clerks: The Animated Series (2000) – ABC

== See also ==
- SModcast Pictures
- View Askewniverse
