= Kevin Smith's unrealized projects =

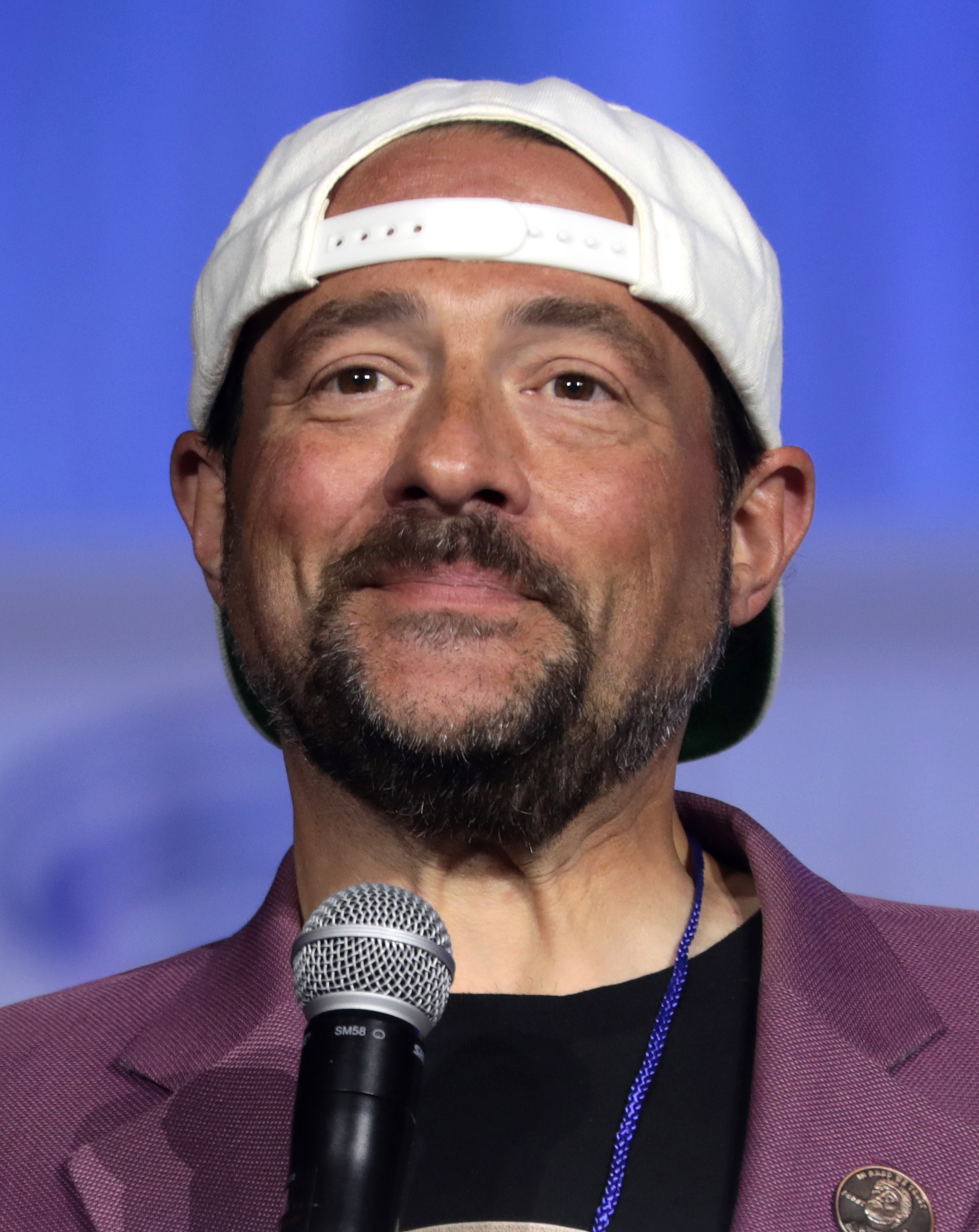
Smith in 2022

During his long career, American film director Kevin Smith mostly has worked on projects which never progressed beyond the pre-production stage under his direction. Some of these projects are officially cancelled and scrapped or fell into development hell.

== 1990s ==
=== 4:30 ===
Long before Clerks, Smith worked on an anthology movie consisting of four thirty-minute shorts.

=== The Six Million Dollar Man ===
Universal Pictures developed a screenplay in 1995 with Smith based on the 1970s television series of the same name. But, by 1998 the outing never materialized and has been passed on to other studios. His script was remade into a limited comic book series titled The Bionic Man.

=== Busing ===
Following Clerks, Smith wrote a film called Busing (has also appeared as "Bussing") for Hollywood Pictures, a now-defunct Disney studio. It was described as "Clerks in a restaurant." The film was announced around 1994 and was intended to be part of the View Askewniverse. The film was not made, but a poster for it parodying the Clerks poster appeared at the end of Jay and Silent Bob Strike Back, and on Millenium Faulken's bedroom wall in Jay and Silent Bob Reboot.

=== The Architects of Fear ===
In 1996, Smith was offered three films to potentially rewrite for Warner Bros.; one of them was a film adaptation of The Outer Limits episode, "The Architects of Fear".

=== Scooby-Doo ===
Smith was interested in working on the 2002 Scooby-Doo remake. He was offered a position by Turner Pictures to write a script in 1996 but Smith would only accept if his producer Scott Mosier agreed to write with him.

=== Superman Lives ===
After Smith was hired to write a new Superman film, he suggested Tim Burton to direct. Burton signed on with a pay-or-play contract of $5 million and Warner Bros. set a theatrical release date for the summer of 1998, the 60th anniversary of the character's debut in Action Comics. Nicolas Cage was signed on to play Superman, with a $20 million pay-or-play contract, believing he could "reconceive the character". Producer Jon Peters felt Cage could "convince audiences he [Superman] came from outer space." Burton explained Cage's casting would be "the first time you would believe that nobody could recognize Clark Kent as Superman, he [Cage] could physically change his persona." Kevin Spacey was approached for the role of Lex Luthor, while Christopher Walken was Burton's choice for Brainiac, a role also considered for Jim Carrey and Gary Oldman. Sandra Bullock, Courteney Cox and Julianne Moore had been approached for Lois Lane, while Chris Rock was cast as Jimmy Olsen. Michael Keaton confirmed his involvement, but when asked if he would be reprising his role as Batman from Burton's Batman films, he would only reply, "Not exactly."

Filming was originally set to begin in early 1998. Burton hired Wesley Strick to rewrite Smith's script and the film entered pre-production in June 1997. Smith was disappointed, stating, "The studio was happy with what I was doing. Then Tim Burton got involved, and when he signed his pay-or-play deal, he turned around and said he wanted to do his version of Superman. So who is Warner Bros. going back to? The guy who made Clerks, or the guy who made them half a billion dollars on Batman?" When Strick read Smith's script, he was annoyed with the fact that "Superman was accompanied/shadowed by someone/something called the Eradicator." He also felt that "Brainiac's evil plot of launching a disk in space to block out the sun and make Superman powerless was reminiscent of an episode of The Simpsons, with Mr. Burns doing the Brainiac role." However, after reading The Death and Return of Superman, Strick was able to understand some of the elements of Smith's script.

=== Green Lantern ===
In 1997, Smith was given the opportunity to write a Green Lantern film as he was finishing up the script for Superman Lives. But he declined the offer as he felt there would be more talented people who can work on it. Following his decline, it would not be for another 14 years until a Green Lantern film would be released and would eventually become a critical and box-office disaster.

=== Hiatus ===
Smith revealed at Wondercon in 2010 about a lost porn-centered television series that eventually became his 2008 film, Zack & Miri Make a Porno. The series would have starred Jason Lee, and was about a man returning home after being away in California and has Lee leading a double life as a porn star. When Smith pitched the series to TV networks in 1997, they all rejected the idea believing that the kind of material handed to them can never happen on television.

=== Name ===
A follow-up to Chasing Amy, Smith wrote a new film set in his View Askewniverse starring the trio from Chasing, but it was not a sequel. Smith said "it was kind of porn-bent." Both Ben Affleck and Joey Lauren Adams were interested in doing the film, but it fell through. In January 2018, Smith discussed possibly developing the film in some form with students of the Ringling College of Art and Design.

== 2000s ==
=== Clerks: Sell Out ===
For several years following the cancellation of Clerks: The Animated Series, Smith announced plans to make an animated film. He revealed in a commentary on Episode 6 that it would go theatrical (with the hopes to win an Academy Award for Best Animated Feature), but later made plans to go direct-to-video. The basic plot involved Dante and Randal making a movie about their lives at the Quick Stop, a reference to the production of the original film. In an interview, Smith expanded on the delays surrounding the film. He stated that when Harvey and Bob Weinstein left Miramax, owned at the time by The Walt Disney Company, the split was not completely amicable. The rights to the Clerks television series were still owned by Disney, who as a result were reluctant to work with The Weinstein Company, throwing the future of Clerks: Sell Out into question. At the 2007 Cornell Q&A, Smith said due to the Miramax/Weinstein argument "you will see a Jay and Silent Bob cartoon before Clerks: Sell Out."

Despite the fact that Sell Out might not get made, Smith's new script for Clerks III followed the original plot from the animated film.

=== Dogma II ===
In late November 2005, Smith responded to talk of a possible sequel to Dogma on the ViewAskew.com message boards:

So weird you should ask this, because ever since 9/11, I have been thinking about a sequel of sorts. I mean, the worst terrorist attack on American soil was religiously bent. In the wake of said attack, the leader of the "Free World" outed himself as pretty damned Christian. In the last election, rather than a quagmire war abroad, the big issue was whether or not gay marriage was moral. Back when I made Dogma, I always maintained that another movie about religion wouldn't be forthcoming, as Dogma was the product of 28 years of religious and spiritual meditation, and I'd kinda shot my wad on the subject. Now? I think I might have more to say. And, yes, the Last Scion would be at the epicenter of it. And she'd have to be played by Alanis. And we'd need a bigger budget, because the entire third act would be the Apocalypse. Scary thing is this: the film would have to touch on Islam. And unlike the Catholic League, when those cats don't like what you do, they issue a death warrant on your ass. And now that I've got a family, I'm not as free to stir the shit-pot as I was when I was single, back when I made Dogma. I mean, now I've gotta think about more than my own safety and well-being. But regardless – yeah, a Dogma followup's been swimming around in my head for some time now.

Over a decade later, there has apparently been no further discussion. But in October 2017, Smith revealed that he no longer desired to make any new religious films.

Near the same time as the cancellation, just weeks before the Weinstein scandal broke to the public, Harvey Weinstein pitched to Smith about doing a sequel. Not much came from this pitch, but it was just a mere idea for Weinstein. According to Smith in an interview with Business Insider, he recalls:

I said, 'Hey, how are you?' And he goes, 'You know, we have Dogma, I just realized, and we got to get it out there again.' I said, 'We do! People online are always asking where they can get it. And he then goes, 'You know, that movie had a big cast, we might even be able to do a sequel.' And I was like, 'Yeah man, right on. I might think about that.' And he was like, 'We'll talk.' And a week later The New York Times story breaks. I felt sick to my stomach.

Smith speculated that he only got the call because, "It was him looking to see who was a friend still because his life was about to shift completely."

=== Scary Movie 3 ===
Smith was assigned to write the 2003 movie, Scary Movie 3. His script was eventually not used.

=== Ghost of Girlfriends Past ===
Smith was attached at one point to direct Ghosts of Girlfriends Past for Disney, under their Touchstone Pictures banner. He said that it never went through due to his attempt to get Fletch Won made. He recalls on a Twitter rant in 2012:

For 5 years, I tried to make it with Jason Lee as the young Irwin Fletcher. I adapted an insanely-faithful-to-the-book FLETCH WON script, which tells the story of a young Fletch's first big story at the newspaper. But Harvey didn't get Jason Lee at all. I'd say "Jason Lee IS Fletch" and he'd say "Lee doesn't have an audience." Even when he was on EARL. And it all came to a head in 2003, while I was in post-production on JERSEY GIRL - when Ben had been offered the lead in a movie at Disney. So Ben asks if I wanna direct this movie in which he's gonna be the lead. Exciting: I'd never directed someone else's feature script before. I read the script and it was fun - but making it with my friend would make it more so, I figured. So with Ben's encouragement, I say "Okay."

This is back when Harvey was running Miramax, which was then owned by Disney. So I figured it'd be no big deal: s'all in the family anyway. But this was also when the split between Harvey and Disney was brewing - which would come to a head with Fahrenheit 911 a few years later. So when I tell Harvey "I'm gonna direct a movie for Ben over at Disney" it went over like I'd said "Y'know who rocks? Bob Shaye & New Line." I had an overall deal w/ Miramax in which they got a first look/crack at anything I wrote and directed. This was directing only, so no prob. But the thought of a pair of Miramaxkateers working for Michael Eisner didn't sit well. I was told to sit tight while they talked to Disney. Harvey told Disney it'd be a co-prod, since he had an overall deal with me. Disney declined so I was then instructed to turn the gig down. I told him my deal allowed me to direct for somebody else. There were lots of guilt-ridden "family" & "us" & "them" terms thrown at me. I was 100% Miramax in those days. I was in the coolest gang in town and I'd die for my colors. But I wasn't LEAVING; just working with Ben. So while I'm trying to point out that my deal allowed for me to direct for others, Harvey hits me with a verbal right hook out of nowhere... Harvey says "Fine: drop that Disney movie and I'll let you make your FLETCH."

I was ready to hug him when he added "With BEN as Fletch." "What about Jason Lee?" I asked. Harvey said that was never going to happen. If I wanted to make FLETCH WON, I had to get Ben to be Fletch. I argued that Ben was still gonna wanna do the flick at Disney, so I was told to convey a message: Miramax would match Ben's Disney offer. So for about two weeks in 2003, we almost rushed my FLETCH WON flick into production with bloated, studio-like salaries. All to beat Disney. Harvey's play was kinda brilliant: he knew the only thing that'd give pause about working elsewhere was working with a friend back home. Ben read and liked the script. And the money was as big as what he was gonna get for the Disney movie. So suddenly, FLETCH WON was possible. An office was opened. Preliminary scouting began. And when shit needs to suddenly happen fast in the movie biz, that costs MONEY, son! Lots! But mercifully, before a $50 million version of FLETCH WON could happen, Ben passed. He said he didn't feel right about flat-leaving Disney. I didn't go with Ben to Disney. Ben was cool about it: he said he'd never understand my loyalty thing to Harvey but he still respected it. See, Harvey knew he had me regardless. Being Miramax MEANT something to me - a code I lived by. We were a gang of NY. It was Us vs All Them. And ironically, I'd never make another movie for Miramax. Harvey & Bob split from Disney a few years later, creating The Weinstein Company.

The next flick I made was CLERKS II. And while I love that film, it never felt right having a Weinstein Company logo at the head of it. See, that's why it's easy for me to leave the movie biz now: When that era of Miramax died, a big piece of my passion for film died with it. So now I'm mostly a podcaster. And Ben's a director who may win Best Picture this year... If Harvey doesn't make it a three-peat. FLETCH wound up at Warner Brothers years later. My only regret is a flick never got made before Fletch creator Greg McDonald died. That Disney movie - the one that caused so much contention and friction? The studio pulled the plug on it mere weeks away from production. So Ben didn't wind up doing the movie anyway - which was called GHOSTS OF GIRLFRIENDS PAST. It was made years later... starring Jen Garner. Ah, Hollywood... After nearly 20 yrs buried balls-deep inside you, I've learned only this: You're as easy and as complicated as high school.

Ghosts of Girlfriends Past was eventually released in 2009 under the Warner Bros./New Line Cinema banner to negative reviews, but was a modest box-office hit.

=== The Green Hornet ===
In February 2004, Miramax Films president Harvey Weinstein announced that Smith was to write and direct a Green Hornet film, based on their previous four-film collaborations. "I dig the fact that he kicked off a run of billionaire playboys who decided to put on a mask and fight crime and that he was Batman before there was a Batman," Smith said.

I always said I'd never do a superhero film, based on my limited experience writing on Superman Lives and having to answer to the studio, Jon Peters, the comics company and eventually a director. Then there's a fandom that gets up in arms if you even try to stray from their character. Here, there is simplicity in the character and the situation.

Jon Gordon and Hannah Minghella were now on as producers, with Harold Berkowitz and George Trendle, son of the character's co-creator, as executive producers. Smith approached Jake Gyllenhaal for the lead role in March 2004. In mid-November of that year, he said he had written about 100 pages, and estimated another 100 to come. In February 2006, Smith's official website noted, "Kevin officially no longer has anything to do with the Fletch Won or Green Hornet projects." Smith went on to write the Dynamite Entertainment comic book Green Hornet, which has run 11 issues as of late 2010.

=== Degrassi: The Next Generation film adaptation ===
Smith, a longtime fan of the Degrassi teen drama franchise, was assigned to direct a feature film adaptation of the franchise's fourth iteration, Degrassi: The Next Generation in 2005. Smith had wanted to direct an episode of the television series, but was unable to due to Canadian content laws, which prohibited him from directing episodes, but allowed him to direct films. By September that year, the film was already at the script stage and awaiting a green light from Paramount Pictures. Smith told Playback that he had considered getting Ben Affleck to cameo in the movie, but decided against it. The project did not go forward for an unspecified reason.

In 2022, Smith revealed to Screen Rant that the movie would have heavily centered on Jimmy Brooks, a character played by Aubrey Graham who was paralyzed in a school shooting, "getting up and walking". Smith claims that they incorporated elements from the script into a future episode of the television series.

=== Ranger Danger and the Danger Rangers ===
Smith was working on a science fiction film since 2008 titled Ranger Danger and the Danger Rangers, or simply Ranger Danger. According to Smith, he said it is, "My stab at a comic-book/sci-fi movie. It's in the vein of Flash Gordon, something I've noodled with a couple of years. Now I feel we are mature enough filmmakers to tackle it." The appearance of Ranger Danger first appeared in Clerks II on a t-shirt that Randal was wearing. The movie was intended to be his 10th film (following after Zack and Miri Make a Porno and Red State). In 2012, when it was announced that Hit Somebody would be Smith's final film as a director, Smith was asked if he was no longer interested in making Ranger Danger. He said,

Well, now I can do it as a cartoon. Now I can do it as a web series if I want. It's no longer just you have to do this one thing. I don't know about anybody else, I'm sure it's exciting for other cats, I hate taking tens of millions of dollars. That's scary, man. It really is. Especially when they're gambling on a dopey idea you had, like a make pretend idea. So for me, I kind of feel like I'd almost rather do that anywhere but have the pressure of “Here's $50-60 million. You've got to make this movie gross.” I don't know if it will. So at the end of the day, if I want to do it, I feel like I can do it comics, animation, web series, any number of things, TV now."

As of 2017, no new updates have been announced for Ranger Danger. Although the Ranger Danger project is left in development hell, the character made an appearance in Jay and Silent Bob Reboot. This version is described as "a gritty, rebooted version of a childhood superhero fave."

== 2010s ==
=== Hit Somebody ===
Smith planned to direct a hockey comedy-drama based on the song Hit Somebody (The Hockey Song) by Warren Zevon. The song, which is about a hockey player famous for fighting in the rink, was co-written by author Mitch Albom, who worked with Smith on the project. Smith announced at the 2011 Sundance premiere of Red State that Hit Somebody would be the last movie he ever directs, and that he would continue to tell stories in other media. In August 2011 Hit Somebody was announced as a two-part film titled Hit Somebody: Home and Hit Somebody: Away with part one being rated PG-13 and part 2 being rated R, but later decided to make it one movie again. In December 2012 Smith announced that, due to difficulties finding funding, Hit Somebody would now be a six-part miniseries on an as-yet unknown network. Smith announced in March 2015 that Hit Somebody would film in September 2015 until Christmas 2015, but this did not happen. As of June 2018, Smith read the scripts for the first and second episode on SModcast and has said that one studio wants to make something with it; while Jeremy Simser, a storyboard artist on Game of Thrones and Supergirl, is developing the other script into a graphic novel.

=== Helena Handbag: The Movie ===
In 2013, Smith announced a new film of his in development. Based on a SModcast episode called "The (C)Rapture", the film was about "mankind teaming up with Hell to save existence from extinction at the hands of a Rapturing giant Jesus" Originally titled Christzilla by long-time collaborator/SModcast producer Scott Mosier, Smith allowed fans to name the film, ending up with the title being Helena Handbag. On New Years Day 2014, Smith took to Facebook that instead of making it as a movie, it will be a stage musical called Helena Handbag: The SMusical. He says that the movie won't be film is because of budgeting concerns. He said,

I got about 20 pages in when I realized there was no way to write this inexpensively as a feature film. Everything was requiring too many effects that I could never achieve using in-camera tricks like forced perspective. It was starting to feel like a pricier project than I know I'd ever be able to find money to make. And then I remembered this is a SModcast Picture. What do we do on SModcast sometimes? We sing. We make up stupid songs. And my favorite piece of art ever produced by human hands is the glorious Book of Mormon. So... I started reshaping the Helena Handbag script as a piece of SMusical theater, with Book of Mormon as my spirit animal. And holy shit... does this feel right! After making up all those goofy tunes on Edumacation and Plus One, not to mention the Fat Man on Batman theme song, this feels like a logical progression.

=== New Jaws Film ===
In 2014, Smith revealed to The Wall Street Journal that he was interested in pitching a new sequel to Jaws. Expressing interest in having Steven Spielberg return to the franchise to direct it. The film would have focused on a hurricane flooding the town of Amity, resulting in yet another great white shark terrorizing the town. It is unknown if Smith ever pitched the film.

=== Anti-Claus ===
In April 2014, Smith announced the Christmas-themed horror movie Anti-Claus, with a script based on the episode "The Christmas Special" of his Edumacation podcast. The script was co-written by his Edumacation co-host Andrew McElfresh, marking it the first script Smith collaborated on with another writer. Filming was initially scheduled for September 2014, with Tusk actors Justin Long, Michael Parks and Haley Joel Osment returning as cast. The movie centered around the European folklore figure Krampus, a devil-esque creature who punishes naughty children.

The film was cancelled due to the release of the 2015 film Krampus, which centered around the same topic. In June 2017, Smith announced that the script was retooled to KillRoy Was Here, with Krampus being replaced by a monster based on the graffiti phenomenon. The film started shooting that same month, with the crew consisting of students of the Ringling College of Art and Design.

=== Moose Jaws ===
Moose Jaws was inspired by Jaws. In June 2015, Harley Morenstein of Epic Meal Time confirmed he will be the lead in the film, following an appearance in the other two offerings. Also in June, Smith revealed that Harley Quinn Smith and Lily-Rose Depp will reprise their roles from Yoga Hosers. In September 2015, Kevin Smith mentioned that his character Silent Bob will be eaten by the killer moose. In 2017, Smith revealed that Johnny Depp would reprise his role as Guy LaPointe, and that the actor suggested that his character be eaten by a moose.

In January 2016, Smith confirmed that Jay and Silent Bob will appear in Moose Jaws, setting the True North trilogy within the View Askewniverse. In February 2016, Smith stated filming on Moose Jaws would start in July 2016 in Saskatchewan, Canada. Smith later said filming was slated to begin in May 2016. In June 2018 during a live recording of Smith's podcast Fatman on Batman, he said that he had secured funding for Moose Jaws. In April 2020, while on Instagram talking about his finished first draft of Twilight of the Mallrats, Smith stated he is working on a new draft of Moose Jaws. In June 2020, Smith revealed he removed Jay and Silent Bob from the latest draft of Moose Jaws.

=== Twilight of the Mallrats ===
From April 2015 to July 2016, Smith made a series of announcements regarding the proposed sequel to Mallrats, some regarding casting and some announcing delays in production. During this time, the planned film became a planned 10-episode television miniseries.

In February 2017, Smith announced that pitches to six different networks resulted in no one willing to produce the TV series, but expressed his hope that interest in the series would spike after the release of the film Jay and Silent Bob Reboot.

In January 2020, Smith announced that development on a Mallrats sequel film had started up again, under a new title, Twilight of the Mallrats. On April 24, Smith stated that he had completed the first draft of the script and that the original cast would return. On May 12, 2020, Smith revealed that Aparna Brielle, who played Jihad in Jay and Silent Bob Reboot, had been set to lead the film as Banner, the daughter of Brodie, and that Doherty would return to reprise her role of Rene Mosier.

Doherty died on July 13, 2024. A few months later, however, Smith suggested that the sequel could still be made, reframed as a tribute to Doherty, with her friend Sarah Michelle Gellar—who had auditioned for a role in the original Mallrats—"step[ping] in for" her. In an Instagram comment, Gellar expressed support for the idea.

=== Buckaroo Banzai TV series ===
Smith was, for a short period of time, involved in a television adaptation of Buckaroo Banzai that would have been produced by Amazon Studios and MGM. Smith stepped down from the project in November 2016 due to MGM filing a lawsuit against the original creators; although he is willing to return if the studio wants him back.

=== Sam and Twitch TV series ===
In a February 2017 exclusive interview with Deadline, the head of BBC America revealed that Smith was attached to write, direct, and executive produce a Sam and Twitch police procedural for BBC America. Similar to the comic book, each episode of the series was planned to follow a closed-ended procedural format, with certain character-serialized aspects to the storytelling. As of 2017, no new updates have been announced for Sam and Twitch.

=== Plastic Man animated film ===
Smith mentioned at the Calgary Comic and Entertainment Expo that he met with DC Entertainment head Geoff Johns and pitched an animated film based on the DC Comics character Plastic Man. Although a script has been written, but not much info has been given as of April 2017.

=== Hollyweed ===
In 2018, Smith dropped the pilot Hollyweed for streaming service Rivit TV, a crowdfunding focused streamer where viewers can fund a show. Described as “Clerks in a weed dispensary”, the pilot starred Smith, Donnell Rawlings, Adam Brody, Jason Mewes, Frankie Shaw, and Ralph Garman. The pilot was shot in the summer of 2017. The plan was to raise $5 million for a six-episode first season. After a 45 day campaign, the plan was not met; but due to the positive response, Rivit TV and other partners would instead fund three episodes instead of the planned six. As of 2021, Rivit TV is working under the name DevoTV, the show was not picked up, and the pilot is still available to watch under third-party YouTube channels.

=== Howard the Duck TV series ===
In February 2019, it was announced that Smith was attached to write and executive produce, alongside Aqua Teen Hunger Force creator Dave Willis, an animated TV series based on the Marvel Comics character Howard the Duck for Hulu. The series was announced alongside other Marvel Comics characters that were getting the Hulu treatment, MODOK, Hit-Monkey, Tigra, and Dazzler, and would have crossover together in an animated special dubbed The Offenders. However, on January 24, 2020, it was announced that the show, alongside Tigra & Dazzler, was cancelled, making The Offenders special unlikely; meanwhile, MODOK and Hit-Monkey continued as planned.

=== The Kingdom Keepers Disney+ series ===
Smith revealed on Fatman Beyond that he was brought in by Disney to help develop a potential television series, based on the Kingdom Keepers book series, for Disney+. He added that it would have utilized the same technology used for The Mandalorian to create virtual backgrounds. He later confirmed that it was cancelled because it would have used too many IPs.

== 2020s ==
=== Tusk$ ===
In 2022, Smith mentioned an idea for a sequel to Tusk, where somehow Wallace would turn himself back into a human and become the new villain. Smith made mention of title being Tusk$. The same year, Long revealed that he had been contacted by Smith about working on a potential sequel.

=== Jay and Silent Bob: Store Wars ===
Smith revealed in 2023 he was writing a new film featuring Jay and Silent Bob as the lead characters.

== See also ==
- Kevin Smith filmography
