= Sucks Less with Kevin Smith =

- Genre: Reality Sitcom
- Created by: Kevin Smith; Scott Mosier
- Written by: Kevin Smith
- Starring: Kevin Smith
- Theme music composer: Loren Bouchard
- Composer: John Dylan Keith
- Country of origin: United States
- Original language: English

Sucks Less with Kevin Smith is a show done in partnership with MTVu, an MTV channel aimed at college students. The show aired weekly on MTVu, on Amp'd Mobile phones, and on MTVu.com. It is "the show for people who have way better things to do with their weekend than get laid." Every week, the show features (at least) three UCLA students who are enrolled in a class about cinematography in which Kevin Smith is the teacher. Each episode is about seven and a half minutes in length and the basic premise of each show is to inform college students of things that can help their weekends suck less.

== Episodes ==
=== Episode One: Come On ===
==== Intro: Kevin ====
Episode One gives the basic premise of the show, had a few gay jokes, a knock on Jersey Girl then got into the episode.

==== Haunted House: Ethan and Jeyun ====
Kevin tells Ethan to go to Disneyland to check out Mickey Mouse's annual Halloween fest. Ethan (reading a Bluntman comic) tells Kevin he didn't do that because he's not nine years old. He and Jeyun went to a haunted house instead.

He travels to The Nest in Queen Creek, Arizona. We learn that it has over US$250,000 in special effects. They first get a tour through during the day, then go through at night. They speak to Glenn Rea, the co-owner of The Nest, who said, "just have fun, don't expect anything, because [even] though I walked you through it and you saw everything, don't think you know where everything is."

They then proceed to go through at night. After they go through, Jeyan is quoted as saying, "it didn't suck, but I did pee a little."

Kevin grades it as a B+ after coming on to Ethan.

==== Roller Derby: Ben ====
Ben tells us about part two and thinks that Kevin is coming onto him. Ben goes to the Roller Derby in the Little Tokyo Shopping Mall in Los Angeles. "It means girls, skates, mini-skirts and hardcore women."

They show the team of the Los Angeles Derby Dolls. They give the basic premise of the game and the rules. The two positions are Jammers and Blockers.

==== mc chris in concert: Cat ====
Heading into part three, Kevin is embracing Cat and assures her he's not coming onto her.

Cat goes to the Roxy and sees mc chris in concert. He is a nerdcore rapper, which means he raps about subjects such as Star Wars, video games, and unrequited love. mc chris says, "my music is like... if Salt-n-Pepa had like a little brother that swore too much, and always got in trouble for it, and was always getting slapped in the face by his mom, like that would be the kind of records that I'm putting out."

==== Behind The Scenes ====
After the show is over, they have a behind the scenes clip that has a mini-interview with someone who is the production assistant.

=== Episode Two: Slappers ===
==== Intro: Nate and Kevin ====
Episode two goes to turtle races, a clothing-optional hot springs, and the Cut and Paste Digital Design Showdown.

It begins by Nate teaching us about Slappers. The rules of this game are the same as poker, except the person with the winning hand gets to slap the losers.

==== Turtle racing: DK ====
DK takes us to Brennan's Pub in Marina Del Rey, California where they race turtles every Thursday evening. They have been racing turtles at the pub for thirty years. Rocky Whatule, one of the promoters, says that the best race he's ever seen involved four turtles and lasted eight minutes, thirty-five seconds.

DK decides to enter the races, but checks first with Dr. Ken Nagy, a professor in the UCLA Dept of Ecology and Evolutionary Biology, as to the best way to help his turtle win. His first turtle is disqualified, but his second turtle wins the race.

==== Clothing-optional hot springs: Cat and Clint ====
Cat and Clint travel to the Little Caliente Hot Springs outside of Santa Barbara, where the "apparent local custom is clothing-optional."

==== Digital design: Phil ====
In the first foray into an event in the Eastern Time Zone, Phil travels to Brooklyn at a leg of the Cut and Paste Digital Design Showdown. During the intro, Phil says to Kevin, who is awaiting a slap at any moment, that Slappers is childish and he prefers "Watch me wee-wee" instead. When Kevin asks how to play, Phil proceeds to urinate on the floor.

Cut and Paste is an elimination tournament. Contestants have fifteen minutes to design something with everyone watching them work and have no idea what they are going to design until the rounds begin.

==== Bodie et al.: show closing ====
The show closes with Bodie putting out a public service announcement about voting to the three people watching, and promptly gets slapped by Kevin. He then says he's going to sue Kevin for $50,000 and walks off with the other students offering to be witnesses and berating Kevin for Jersey Girl.

=== Episode Three: Drop-Out ===
==== Intro: Kevin and Cat ====
Episode 3 begins with Cat berating Kevin for being a two-time college dropout, and refuses to call him "el Professorio", all this from his page on English Wikipedia. (None of the facts in the intro skits are actually on his English Wikipedia page, however.)

==== Samba Dancing: Bodie and Jeyun ====
Bodie and Kevin get on each other for their baldness and obesity, respectively, and Bodie mentions he has more college credits than Kevin. He bribes Kevin into giving him an A.

Bodie's and Jeyun's report is on Samba Night at Cafe Danssa in Los Angeles.

Bodie speaks to Luis Ferreira and Riane Gracie of the M.I.L.A. Samba School who give some advice for Samba dancing: relax and enjoy. He mentions an hour of dancing lessons is only $10. Karla Blume, one of the co-owners of Cafe Danssa says that their patrons "love this place because it is packed, the music's great, it's live, it's wild, but it's really calm and laid-back."

==== The Ice Cream Man: Ethan ====
Ethan continues getting on him about not graduating and tricks Kevin out of his car.

He sees Matt Allen, The Ice Cream Man outside of the Space Land concert venue. Matt travels to concert venues around the country and gives away free ice cream. He has given ice cream to such famous names as Elvis Costello, Ben Gibberd, Jeff Tweedy, and Wayne from the Flaming Lips.

Ethan then goes out to give away free ice cream and Matt mentions that he is good at it.

==== Xtreme Ironing: Jonathan ====
Jonathan says he does not mind that Kevin is not qualified to teach, but then asks him as a teacher to help him with a scholastic problem, which is to bury a dead prostitute. Kevin asks how that is a scholastic problem and Jonathan says it is because the body is in his dormitory room.

Xtreme Ironing is, as Jonathan puts it, "the act of going out into nature to iron." He is standing in the middle of a dirt trail, with an ironing board, a shirt, and an iron (unplugged), ironing the shirt. "They have X Games, and they have other... extreme games, I've never really been that...extreme of a guy. But I... I can iron. Oh yes, I can iron."

He then goes to iron in locations such as outside the Capitol Records Building, Mann's Chinese Theatre, Sunset Boulevard, and Venice Beach.

He says to send photos of the most extreme places you can iron at the MTVu website.

==== Outro: Ethan, Bodie, Jonathan, and Kevin ====
Kevin thanks the three for not ratting him out, and Ethan says it's ok. He continues the blackmail though by mentioning they all want parts in his next movie. Kevin says he doesn't know what his next movie's going to be. Jonathan says it's going to be "Jonathan, Ethan, and Bodie sleep with Kevin Smith's wife." Kevin starts yelling and defending his wife. Bodie says it will be a short film because they don't believe in foreplay.

Over the credits, they remind him that lying about a job in a state university is a federal offense punishable by up to one year in prison. Kevin then gets on his phone and calls his wife Jen to cancel dinner with the Afflecks because she has to sleep with three of his students. In reply to a question, he says "Yeah, they're kind of sexy."

=== Episode Four: Kevin's breakdown ===
==== Intro ====
In the intro to Episode 4, Kevin writes a letter to the students saying he quit because he sucks as both filmmaker and a teacher after reading the reviews of the show on the Internet. Because peer acceptance means jack if someone on the Internet doesn't like your stuff. It closes by a student asking, "does anyone else think it's weird that the man shot a montage to accompany his letter?"

==== Dagmar and Jonathan: squirrel fishing ====
Since they need "a fat guy on such short notice", they dress Jonathan up to look like Kevin.

Dagmar comes off with a warning: "No squirrels were harmed in the making of this Sucks Less episode, but many were fed."

==== Amy: volunteering at the Austin Film Festival ====
Amy visits the Austin Film Festival in Austin, Texas. She speaks with a few volunteers, who say that it's cool. They've met celebrities such as Will Ferrell and Michael Ian Black. One of the people interviewed was a former volunteer who now works for the film festival. Another stated that the worst part was the pay, which was nothing more than a T-shirt. Some of the better things though are that you get to go to the films for free, and there is free food. One person asks how Kevin is as a teacher, and then it cuts out to the info page.

==== Jeyun: Street Wars ====
Jonathan says he's tired of being Kevin and wants to be Jeyun; the class agrees.

Street Wars is a three-week-long squirt gun assassination tournament. If you sign up, you receive an envelope containing your ID card and your target and their preferred weapon of choice.

She meets up with Agent Tuna for some training with Street Wars. Training included push-ups, rolling on the ground, and running up the stairs like in Rocky.

We then see her stalking her enemy, ultimately getting "killed" by him.

==== Outro ====
Kevin returns to see the entire class having become a cult of Kevins, except for Jonathan, who is Jeyun. Creeped out, we close to Kevin hiding in a corner under a blanket.
