= Salim Baba =

2007 film

- Directed by: Tim Sternberg
- Produced by: Francisco Bello; Scott Mosier
- Cinematography: Francisco Bello
- Edited by: Arturo Sosa
- Production companies: Ropa Vieja Films and Paradox Smoke Productions
- Distributed by: Cinemax
- Release date: 2007
- Running time: 15 minutes
- Country: United States
- Language: Bengali

Salim Baba is a 2007 American short documentary film directed by Tim Sternberg. It was nominated for an Academy Award for Best Documentary Short.

== Content ==
The film follows Salim Muhammad, a 55-year-old man who lives in Kolkata with his wife and children. Since the age of ten he has supported himself by screening discarded film scraps for area children. He uses a hand-cranked projector that he inherited from his father. A businessman as well as a cinephile, Salim runs his projector with his sons. He hopes that they will carry on this tradition.

== Production ==
Salim Baba was co-produced by Ropa Vieja Films and Paradox Smoke Productions, with a grant from the Urban Arts Initiative and financial support from the Independent Feature Project. The film was presented as part of Maryland Film Festival's Opening Night shorts program on the evening of May 1, 2008.
