= Kevin Smith: Silent but Deadly =

Kevin Smith: Silent But Deadly
- Starring: Kevin Smith
- Release date: 2018
- Country: United States
- Language: English

Kevin Smith: Silent But Deadly is a stand-up comedy television special starring Kevin Smith.

The first of two planned stand-up shows, its filming was completed an hour before Smith suffered a severe heart attack.
