= Sold Out: A Threevening with Kevin Smith =

2008 TV program

- Written by: Kevin Smith
- Directed by: Joey Figueroa; Zak Knutson
- Starring: Kevin Smith; Jennifer Schwalbach Smith; Harley Quinn Smith
- Original language: English

Original release
- Release: October 21, 2008

Sold Out: A Threevening with Kevin Smith is the third film in Kevin Smith's "Evening With" series.

Footage for the release was shot at a Q&A performance on August 2, 2007, Smith's 37th birthday, in front of a sold-out crowd at the Count Basie Theatre in Red Bank, New Jersey. Smith was introduced by his wife Jennifer Schwalbach Smith and his daughter, Harley Quinn Smith.

The film includes 4 hours edited from the original 7 hour performance. Topics included the origin of Kevin's name, Kevin suffering from an anal fissure, as well as stories from acting in the American television series Manchild, Live Free or Die Hard, Catch and Release and shooting Clerks II. It was also revealed that because of his work on Live Free or Die Hard, Bruce Willis contacted him about working together; this eventually led to Cop Out.

The film was released on October 21, 2008.
