= An Evening with Kevin Smith 2: Evening Harder =

2006 film

- Written by: Kevin Smith
- Directed by: J. M. Kenny
- Starring: Kevin Smith; Jason Mewes
- Original language: English

Original release
- Release: 2006

An Evening with Kevin Smith 2: Evening Harder is filmmaker Kevin Smith's second Q&A DVD, released on November 28, 2006. The footage is taken from Smith's Q&As at Roy Thomson Hall in Toronto on November 18, 2004, and the Criterion Theatre in London on March 7, 2005. A Special Edition 2-disc DVD set released in Australia on October 25, 2006, included An Evening with Kevin Smith since it had not yet been released in Australia.

The subtitle is a reference to Die Hard 2, as well as a play on the phrase "even harder".

== Reception ==
Eye for Film's review said, "If you're willing to embrace a little geekiness, there are plenty of laughs to be had throughout. Anyone who has seen a Kevin Smith film, or two, and enjoyed them will find Evening 2 time well spent."
