= Kevin Smith: Too Fat for 40 =

- Written by: Kevin Smith
- Directed by: Joey Figueroa; Zak Knutson
- Starring: Kevin Smith
- Original language: English

Production
- Running time: Original broadcast: 117 min DVD: 200 min

Original release
- Release: October 22, 2010

Kevin Smith: Too Fat for 40 is the fourth installment of Kevin Smith's Q&A series and was broadcast on epix on October 23, 2010. The title is a reference to his feud with Southwest Airlines. In the film, Smith's announced attempt to answer a multitude of questions quickly is derailed entirely when the first, and ultimately only, question posed is about working with Bruce Willis, which begins a near-two-hour rant in which he discusses, among other things, the adult use of marijuana, the highs and lows of making his 2008 film Zack and Miri Make a Porno and the stress of working with Willis during Cop Out.

The special was filmed at the Count Basie Theatre in Smith's hometown of Red Bank, New Jersey. The stage background was a recreation of the storefronts from the Quick Stop Groceries (renamed "Middle Age Stop Groceries" and with the sign "I Assure You I'm 40" in place of the "I Assure You We're Open" sign) and RST Video as seen in Clerks and Clerks II.

On October 18, 2011, Shout! Factory released Too Fat for 40 on DVD and Blu-ray in the full 3.5-hour version of the special, which was cut down for broadcast. It is being sold both individually and as part of two special boxed sets, the first which includes the SModimations: Season One DVD and an exclusive DVD featuring a fully filmed episode of Kevin's Hollywood Babble-On podcast (which he co-hosts with Ralph Garman). The second set features all 3 DVDs and a Blu-ray/DVD Combo copy of Too Fat For 40 (with Disc 1 in Blu-ray format and Disc 2 in DVD format).

== Reception ==
Den of Geek said, "With it’s three-hour plus running time, it’s a huge sell if you’re not a fan of Kevin Smith, but it’s definitely worth having if you appreciate his work"
