= Scott Mosier =

American film director and producer (born 1971)

- Born: March 5, 1971 (age 55); Vancouver, Washington, U.S.
- Citizenship: United States; Canada
- Occupations: Film producer; director; editor
- Spouse: Alex Hilebronner (m. 2006)
- Website: smodcast.com

Scott A. Mosier (born March 5, 1971) is an American-Canadian film producer, director and editor best known for his work with director Kevin Smith, with whom he occasionally co-hosts the weekly podcast SModcast.

== Early life ==
Mosier was born in Vancouver, Washington.

Mosier met Kevin Smith while both were attending Vancouver Film School in Canada. Their first assignment, Mae Day: The Crumbling of a Documentary, was a student film documentary that fell apart in production. To salvage it, Smith and Mosier interviewed the crew about the demise of the very documentary that they had been attempting to produce.

Four months into the eight-month program, Smith decided to drop out, but not before making a deal with Mosier: each would start writing a script of his own, and the one who finished last would help the other with his film.

== Career ==
=== View Askew ===
Based on their agreement to work together based on who came up with a script first, Mosier began his career working with Smith on his 1994 movie debut, Clerks. He both co-produced and co-edited the film and he also contributed by appearing on-screen as multiple characters, including the angry hockey player and Willam Black (Snowball).

Mosier moved on to work with Kevin again on his major studio debut movie, 1996's Mallrats, acting again as producer. This was the first time they would work with Line Producer Laura Greenlee, who went on to collaborate with View Askew many times over her career. In the film, he portrayed Svenning's assistant, Roddy. The character later appeared on a Jay and Silent Bob MTV short.

In 1997, Kevin and Scott collaborated again on the award winning Chasing Amy, sharing the producing and editing duties again. Mosier appears in the beginning of the film as the comics convention patron who gets into an argument with Banky Edwards (Jason Lee) after demeaning his career as a “tracer”.

On the 1999 film Dogma, Mosier worked with Greenlee again; the editing of the film lasted nearly a year. He also played the Smooching Seaman who Ben Affleck and Matt Damon meet on the bus.

On the 2001 film Jay and Silent Bob Strike Back, Mosier worked with a budget of $20 million. In the film, Mosier played the assistant director on the set of the fictional sequel to Good Will Hunting and reprises his Willam Black character from Clerks.

Mosier had a larger budget to work with on the film Jersey Girl, at $35 million. The editing was difficult due to the studio's desire to cut a large amount of Jennifer Lopez footage and did not feature her in the marketing following the poor box-office performance of Gigli.

Mosier produced Clerks II in 2006. Smith stated he edited the film himself, making Clerks II one of three films Mosier has produced with Smith, but not edited (the others being Mallrats and Zack and Miri Make a Porno). Mosier makes a brief cameo as a concerned father who shields his daughter's eyes from the sight of a character sitting on a toilet.

In 2008, Mosier worked again with Smith as the producer on Zack and Miri Make a Porno.

=== Other work ===
Mosier served as an executive producer, editor, and actor for Bryan Johnson's Vulgar, an Askew production. He had also served as a producer (along with Smith) on Drawing Flies, A Better Place, and Clerks: The Animated Series; he served as a co-executive producer on Good Will Hunting and Big Helium Dog. He also appeared in cameos in Drawing Flies as the Crying Diaperman, in A Better Place as Larry, and in Vulgar as Scotty. Although he barely recorded any episodes in 2017, Mosier is also a co-host, along with Smith, of the SModcast podcast hosted by the Smith-owned SModcast.com.

In 2007, Salim Baba, a short documentary Mosier produced, was nominated for an Academy Award. Filmmakers Tim Sternberg and Francisco Bello received the nomination (Mosier was unable to be nominated due to a limit of two nominees per short film).

On SModcast 77, Mosier announced he would not produce Smith's film Cop Out (2010), instead pursuing his directorial debut. He stated on SModcast 90 that he finished writing his first feature screenplay and was in the process of trying to sell it.

On August 10, 2011, Mosier stated on Twitter that he has written some episodes of the Ultimate Spider-Man cartoon on Disney. This was confirmed in a special "SModcast Extra" (attached to SModcast No. 204 and episode 5 of the Comic Book Men podcast "Secret Stash") in which he and Smith interview Joe Casey; Mosier has written six scripts for the series.

Mosier made his directorial debut with Illumination Entertainment's animated feature The Grinch, based on the book by Dr. Seuss, and co-directed with Yarrow Cheney. It was released on November 9, 2018.

== Personal life ==
Mosier was personally involved with fellow producer Monica Hampton for a while, whom he met while the two were producing Vulgar. He married girlfriend Alex Hilebronner on September 1, 2006. The couple met on the set of Jersey Girl.

In the documentary Back to the Well: Clerks II, he states that he is agnostic, but has gone to church with Kevin Smith on occasion.

== Filmography ==
Film
Year	Title	Role	Notes
1994	Clerks	Willam "Snowball" Black; Angry Hockey Player; Mourner	Co-producer; Co-Film editor with Kevin Smith; Special thanks
1995	Mallrats	Roddy	Producer; Storyboard artist Executive album producer Special thanks
1996	Drawing Flies	Crying Diaperman	Executive producer
1997	Good Will Hunting		Co-executive producer
1997	A Better Place	Larry	Executive producer Sound editor
1997	Chasing Amy	Collector	Producer; Editor; Special thanks
1999	Tail Lights Fade		Executive producer Special thanks
1999	Dogma	Smooching Seaman	Producer; Editor; Storyboard artist Second unit director Special thanks
1999	Big Helium Dog		Executive producer
2000	Vulgar	Scotty	Executive producer Special thanks editor Dialogue editor
2001	Jay and Silent Bob Strike Back	Good Will Hunting 2: Hunting Season Assistant Director; Willam Black; Collector (deleted scene)	Producer; Editor; Storyboard artist Second unit director (uncredited); Executive album producer Special thanks
2004	Jersey Girl		Producer; Editor
2005	The Ape		Editor
2005	Fool's Gold		Editor
2005	Reel Paradise		Producer
2006	Clerks II	Concerned Father	Producer; Special thanks
2007	Who's Your Caddy?		Editor
2007	Small Town Gay Bar		Executive producer Editor; Special thanks
2008	Zack and Miri Make a Porno		Producer
2012	Best Kept Secret		Executive producer
2012	A Band Called Death		Producer
2013	Free Birds	Pizza Dude	Producer; Screenplay
2013	Jay & Silent Bob's Super Groovy Cartoon Movie	The General	Voice only
2013	Potential Inertia		Inspirational thanks
2013	Milius		Executive producer
2018	The Grinch		Co-director; Additional voices
2019	The Secret Life of Pets 2		Additional voices
2019	Jay and Silent Bob Reboot	S.W.A.T. Officer; Bluntman Fan	
2021	Sing 2	Mason	Additional voices
2022	Clerks III	Willam "Snowball" Black	Role shared with Ethan Suplee
2027	Baahubali: The Eternal War – Part 1		Screenplay
TBA	Meebo and Me		Director

Television
Year	Title	Role	Notes
1995	Clerks		Special thanks
1996	Hiatus		Executive producer
1999	Viewaskew's Look Back at Mallrats	Himself – Producer	Special thanks
2006	Clerks II: Unauthorized	Himself	
2012	Ultimate Spider-Man		Writer: Six episodes
2014	Marvel 75 Years: From Pulp to Pop!		Editor

Videos
Year	Title	Role	Notes
2001	Judge Not: In Defence of Dogma	Himself – Interviewee	Producer
2002	An Evening With Kevin Smith	Himself – Voice Over the Phone	
2004	Clerks: 10th Anniversary Q & A	Himself	
2004	Clerks: The Lost Scene		Producer
2004	Snowball Effect: The Story of Clerks	Himself	
2006	Train Wreck!	Himself	Editor
2006	Back to the Well: Clerks II	Himself	Executive producer Special thanks
2009	Tracing Amy: The Chasing Amy Doc	Himself	

Short films
Year	Title	Job	Notes
1992	Mae Day: The Crumbling of a Documentary	Director writer producer	
2002	The Flying Car	Producer editor First assistant director	
2007	Salim Baba	Producer	Oscar nominated for Best Documentary Short
2016	Eddie's Life Coach	Director	Sing short film
