= Jeff Anderson =

American film actor, film director, and screenwriter

- Anderson at GalaxyCon St Louis in 2026
- Born: Jeffrey Allan Anderson; April 21, 1970 (age 56); Connecticut, United States
- Occupations: Actor; director; writer
- Years active: 1994–present
- Spouses: Lisa Spoonauer (m. 1998; div. 1999) Barbara Jacques (m. 2009)

Jeffrey Allan Anderson (born April 21, 1970) is an American film & television actor, director, and screenwriter best known for starring as Randal Graves in Clerks, Clerks II, and Clerks III. In between, he has appeared in other Kevin Smith-directed films and has written, directed, and starred in Now You Know.

== Early life ==
Born in Connecticut and raised in Atlantic Highlands, New Jersey, Anderson attended Henry Hudson Regional High School, with his friend, aspiring writer Kevin Smith; they graduated in 1988.

While Anderson was working at AT&T, Smith was working on his debut movie Clerks. As a joke, Anderson auditioned for the role of "Jay;" based on this audition, Smith later offered Anderson a lead role as video store employee Randal Graves, a foul-mouthed apathetic slacker, who patronized, angered, and mocked his customers while avoiding any real work opportunities.

== Career ==
For his role in Clerks, Anderson was nominated for an Independent Spirit Award for Best Debut Performance.

In 2002, Anderson wrote, directed, and starred in Now You Know. Writing lasted only three months. Anderson received a nomination for Best Male Performance at the Chicago Film Festival for his role in Love 101, and has been seen in Peter Bergstrom's Something Cool. Anderson also started his own production company in Hollywood.

Anderson was initially reluctant to reprise his role as Randal, but changed his mind after reading Kevin Smith's screenplay for Clerks II, and in 2006 appeared in the sequel.

In 2008, Anderson appeared in Smith's romantic comedy Zack and Miri Make a Porno as Deacon, the cameraman and film editor for the porno made by leading actors Seth Rogen and Elizabeth Banks.

On September 14, 2010, Anderson made his first appearance on Smith's SModcast filling in for Scott Mosier on SModcast #134. In his podcast, Anderson stated he had moved out of Los Angeles and into a "retirement community in the mountains" where he is "the youngest person there by 20 years." He also said he remarried in 2009, to an actress named Barbara Jacques he met while house sitting for Kevin Smith.

In April 2017, Anderson declined to reprise his role as Randal for Clerks III; the reasons have not been made public. An $8 million budget had been obtained, locations were being scouted in Philadelphia and a crew was being assembled, and the start of production was less than two months away. Due to Anderson's decision, production on the film was halted indefinitely, with Smith saying he would not recast the role. On October 1, 2019, Smith announced on Instagram that Clerks III was happening and that Anderson agreed to reprise his role as Randal. "It'll be a movie that concludes a saga. It'll be a movie about how you're never too old to completely change your life. It'll be a movie about how a decades-spanning friendship finally confronts the future. It'll be a movie that brings us back to the beginning — a return to the cradle of civilization in the great state of #newjersey. It'll be a movie that stars Jeff and Brian O'Halloran, with me and Jay in supporting roles. And it'll be a movie called CLERKS III!" Clerks III was released in 2022, completely rewritten from the 2017 version.

== Filmography ==
=== Film ===
Film work by Jeff Anderson
Year	Title	Role	Notes
1994	Clerks	Randal Graves	
1999	Dogma	Gun Salesman	
2000	Love 101	Phil	
2000	Vulgar	Surly Duck	Voice role; uncredited
2001	Stealing Time	Buddy	
2001	Jay and Silent Bob Strike Back	Randal Graves	
2002	Now You Know	Gil	also director and writer
2002	The Flying Car	Randal Graves	Short film
2004	Clerks: The Lost Scene	Randal Graves	Short film; voice role
2006	Clerks II	Randal Graves	
2008	Zack and Miri Make a Porno	Deacon	
2014	Finding London	Sam	Short film
2022	Clerks III	Randal Graves	Also executive producer
2024	The 4:30 Movie	Dad in the theater concession stand line	
TBA	Nasa Seals	Dr. Jay Lavely	filming

=== Television ===
Television work by Jeff Anderson
Year	Title	Role	Notes
2000-2001	Clerks: The Animated Series	Randal Graves	Main role; 6 episodes, voice role
2011	Star Wars: The Clone Wars	Smug	Episode: "Wookiee Hunt"; voice role

=== Video games ===
Video game work by Jeff Anderson
Year	Title	Role	Notes
2014	Randal's Monday	Randal Hicks	Voice role
