= Clerks: The Animated Series =

American animated sitcom

- Title card featuring the four main characters. Top from the left: Dante Hicks, Randal Graves, bottom from the left: Jay, and Silent Bob.
- Also known as: Clerks
- Genre: Comedy
- Created by: Kevin Smith
- Based on: Clerks by Kevin Smith
- Developed by: David Mandel; Scott Mosier; Kevin Smith
- Voices of: Brian O'Halloran; Jeff Anderson; Jason Mewes; Kevin Smith
- Composer: James L. Venable
- Country of origin: United States
- Original language: English
- No. of seasons: 1
- No. of episodes: 6

Production
- Executive producers: Bob Weinstein; Harvey Weinstein; Billy Campbell; David Mandel; Scott Mosier; Kevin Smith
- Running time: 22 minutes
- Production companies: Miramax Television; View Askew Productions; Woltz International Pictures Corporation; Touchstone Television; Walt Disney Television Animation (uncredited)

Original release
- Network: ABC
- Release: May 31 – June 7, 2000
- Network: Comedy Central
- Release: December 14, 2002

Clerks (retronym: Clerks: The Animated Series) is an American adult animated sitcom created by Kevin Smith for ABC. Based on Smith's 1994 comedy film of the same name, it was developed for television by Smith, Smith's producing partner Scott Mosier and former Seinfeld writer David Mandel with character designs by Stephen Silver, later known for character designs in Disney Channel's Kim Possible and Nickelodeon's Danny Phantom. It is the first television show to be set in Smith's View Askewniverse. It is Disney’s second adult animated television series after The PJs.

Six episodes of the show were produced; only two episodes aired before the show was cancelled by ABC, with the remaining episodes burnt off at Comedy Central.

== Production ==
Clerks: The Animated Series was produced by Miramax, View Askew Productions and Woltz International Pictures Corporation in association with Walt Disney Television. In addition to being Disney's second adult animated series after fellow Walt Disney Television production The PJs, it was also the first (and so far only) adult animated series produced by Walt Disney Television Animation, which ultimately went uncredited.

According to the commentary for the series premiere episode, Smith and Mosier first had the idea of the animated series in 1995. In that same commentary, Mosier claimed that they pitched the series to "every" network, including HBO, Fox, The WB, and several others. They were given a thirteen-episode order from UPN, but turned down the offer in order to be on a bigger channel like ABC, having been told that UPN would be off the air within a year.

On a DVD bonus feature, Smith revealed that they initially cast Alan Rickman as the voice of Leonardo Leonardo, so they decided to design the character after Hans Gruber from the film Die Hard (1988). Rickman disapproved of the design because he did not want to play the character again. ABC eventually turned him down anyway for budgetary reasons and recast the role with Alec Baldwin. In 2024, while appearing on the Blank Check podcast, Smith revealed that Rickman's voice for Leonardo Leonardo was an impression of Ross Perot.

Clerks: The Animated Series faced many delays until it was unceremoniously dumped for broadcast in May 2000. Smith stated he felt ABC decided to reduce risk by promoting Who Wants to Be a Millionaire in comparison to Clerks which Smith felt the network now saw as unnecessary in comparison to continuing to support Who Wants to Be a Millionaire. An unknown Disney staffer sent a letter to the View Askew website under the pseudonym of "The Anonymous Loon" copying a memo that had been circulated around Walt Disney Television Animation detailing claims of Smith and his writing staff's inflated egos, late script submissions, and delays in approving character designs. Smith accepted responsibility for the delays in scripts and character designs, but denied culpability for the late release date stating that Disney ultimately held responsibility for burning off the series in May. Paul Dini, Smith's friend and colleague who collaborated with him on the series backed up Smith's claims against ABC, stating that Clerks became a victim of the success of Who Wants to Be a Millionaire.

== Broadcast history ==
Only two episodes were broadcast on ABC in the year 2000 before the series was canceled. Several factors contributed to the cancellation, including low ratings, the show's not fitting in with ABC's other programming, unsuccessful test-screening to older audiences, and ABC's decision to air the episodes out of order. ABC aired the fourth episode first, as opposed to the intended first episode, and then aired the second episode despite the fact that the second episode is the 'flashback' episode, and derives much of its humor from the fact that it flashes back to the first episode (as well as the beginning of that very episode) rather frequently. Additionally, the second episode aired without the scene from "Flintstone's List", the fictional RST Video rental that spoofed Schindler's List.

All six episodes were released on DVD in 2001, marking one of the first occasions in which a short-lived TV series found success in this format. The DVD commentary features cast and crew who frequently cite their disagreements with the network over the show's development. The entire series was eventually aired on Comedy Central, with the unaired episodes airing for the first time on television on December 14, 2002. In 2006, digital Freeview channel ITV 4 in the UK, began broadcasting episodes late on Monday nights. Starting November 14, 2008, Cartoon Network's Adult Swim block aired the series on Friday nights. It also aired on the El Rey Network during their "Jay and Silent Bob Takeover Marathon."

Several scenes filmed for, but cut from, Smith's 2001 film Jay and Silent Bob Strike Back (but included on the film's DVD release) contain metafictional moments when Randal makes references to the animated series, as well as its cancellation. On his DVD commentary for the film, Smith said the intent was to make the quick cancellation of the series a running gag.

== Voice cast ==
=== Main cast ===
- Brian O'Halloran as Dante Hicks
- Jeff Anderson as Randal Graves
- Jason Mewes as Jay
- Kevin Smith as Silent Bob

=== Recurring characters ===
- Alec Baldwin as Leonardo Leonardo
- Dan Etheridge as Mr. Plug
- Charles Barkley as Himself

=== Guests ===
- Tara Strong as Giggling Girl
- Walt Flanagan as Fanboy
- Bryan Johnson as Steve-Dave Pulasti
- Gilbert Gottfried as Jerry Seinfeld and Patrick Swayze
- Kevin Michael Richardson as Narrator
- James Woods as Major Blakava
- Michael Buffer as Himself
- Gwyneth Paltrow as Herself
- Judge Reinhold as Honorable Judge Reinhold
- Kenny Mayne as Himself
- Bryan Cranston as Various
- Jeff Bennett as British Customer
- April Winchell as Bailiff
- Phil LaMarr as Axel Foley
- Lauren Tom as Various
- Kerri Kinney-Silver as Mother/Muffin Lady
- Brian Posehn as Albert/Man on Fire
- Michael McKean as Professor Ram/Creepy Old Guy
- Kath Soucie as Jay's Granddaughter/Angry Customer/Starstruck Woman
- Dana Gould as Guy in 80's Flashback
- Kevin McDonald as Batman Fan/Freak
- Mark McKinney as Freak #2
- Michael McShane as X
- Paul Dini as George Lucas
- Frank Welker as Bill Clinton

== Episodes ==
| No. | Title | Directed by | Written by | Original release date | Prod. code | US viewers (millions) |
|---|---|---|---|---|---|---|
| 1 | "Leonardo Leonardo Returns and Dante Has an Important Decision to Make" | Chris Bailey | David Mandel & Kevin Smith | December 14, 2002 (Comedy Central) | 101 | N/A |
Billionaire Leonardo Leonardo returns to Leonardo, New Jersey and opens the Quicker Stop right across from the Quick Stop, which takes away all of Dante and Randal's customers, and nearly puts the Quick Stop out of business. The duo set out to stop Leonardo by uncovering his plot to enslave all of humanity, but are scoffed at during an appearance at Town Hall. Jay and Silent Bob, who had been selling illegal fireworks to children, inadvertently blow up the Quicker Stop, thwarting Leonardo's plans.
| 2 | "The Clip Show Wherein Dante and Randal are Locked in the Freezer and Remember Some of the Great Moments in Their Lives" | Nick Filippi | Story by : Paul Dini and David Mandel & Kevin Smith; Teleplay by : David Mandel & Kevin Smith | June 7, 2000 | 102 | 6.13 |
Dante and Randal get locked in the freezer of the Quick Stop. There, they look back on their lives, primarily in clips from the same and previous episode, including foiling Leonardo's evil plans, working at convenience stores in the United Kingdom and India, how Randal got them kicked off The Real World, and their first meeting as children. Jay and Silent Bob also manage to get themselves locked in; Silent Bob eventually uses a crowbar to get them all out, only for Dante and Randal to become locked in the video store. In a parody of Stand by Me, an elderly Jay narrates what became of his friends following the events of the episode.
| 3 | "Leonardo Is Caught in the Grip of an Outbreak of Randal's Imagination and Patrick Swayze Either Does or Doesn't Work in the New Pet Store" | Chris Bailey | David Mandel & Kevin Smith | December 14, 2002 (Comedy Central) | 103 | N/A |
Quick Stop is put under government control after Leonardo is said to have been infected with a deadly virus by a monkey at the new pet store next to RST Video (at which they find Patrick Swayze working). Unfortunately, Jay and Silent Bob steal the monkey so they can teach it to smoke. The town of Leonardo is to be destroyed unless Dante and Randal manage to stop the helicopter pilot from dropping a bomb. After Randal tells the pilot that Dante is gay, Dante is forced to state that he is gay on live television to save the town.: Guest star: James Woods
| 4 | "A Dissertation on the American Justice System by People Who Have Never Been Inside a Courtroom, Let Alone Know Anything About the Law, but Have Seen Way Too Many Legal Thrillers" | Steve Loter | Story by : Steve Lookner; Teleplay by : Steve Lookner and David Mandel & Kevin Smith | May 31, 2000 | 104 | 7.39 |
Randal is left in charge of the Quick Stop as part of a bet between him and Dante. Jay sues the Quick Stop for $10,000,000 after slipping on Randal's spilled soda and being refused a pack of cigarettes as compensation. Randal is Dante's lawyer for the case, while Judge Reinhold presides, and several NBA all-stars are members of the jury. Randal ends up doing more harm than good, putting Dante at the mercy of the courtroom. Before the verdict of the case can be announced, a disclaimer informs the audience that the script for the remainder of the episode was lost and that a new ending was written by the Korean animators. The episode ends with a series of animated non sequiturs with Engrish dialogue.: Guest star: Michael Buffer
| 5 | "Dante and Randal and Jay and Silent Bob and a Bunch of New Characters and Lando, Take Part in a Whole Bunch of Movie Parodies Including But Not Exclusive to, The Bad News Bears, The Last Starfighter, Indiana Jones and the Temple of Doom, Plus a High School Reunion" | Nick Filippi | Brian Kelley | December 14, 2002 (Comedy Central) | 105 | N/A |
Dante and Randal attend their high school reunion, where Randal discovers he has the ability to turn women into lesbians, and Dante is accosted by his old baseball team because they don't remember him (although Dante was the coach that won them the championship game). Leonardo decides to let Dante manage his Little League team. The team is on a losing streak until the inclusion of Jay and Silent Bob (as Jay is still in the fourth grade for being held back so many times and is technically eligible to play). Meanwhile, Randal is put into slave labor after beating the high score on an old video game. Dante and the baseball team discover Randal while searching for the baseball team they have been scheduled to play (which turn out to be some of the children enslaved to work in the mines).
| 6 | "The Last Episode Ever" | Steve Loter | Kevin Smith & David Mandel | December 14, 2002 (Comedy Central) | 106 | N/A |
Dante and Randal work inside the Quick Stop discussing various things after being told that they need to make the show more similar to the original Clerks. Meanwhile, outside, Dante's supposed to have a date with Caitlin Bree, Jay and Silent Bob go to a fair where havoc ensues, Walt and Steve-Dave need stuff, Leonardo Leonardo finds a soccer team on his roof, and Dante keeps getting called by a guy who wants to show him "the truth about The Matrix". Eventually, due to a phone call unknowingly made to the President, the Army surrounds the Quick Stop, the President is attacked by hookers and vampires who are enraged to find RST closed, and Dante and Randal finally go outside, where the animators put them in various awkward situations until it is revealed that Jay is the one behind it all.

== Aftermath ==
For several years following the series' cancellation, Smith announced plans to make an animated film. He revealed in a commentary on Episode 6 that it would go theatrical (with the hopes of winning the newly launched Academy Award for Best Animated Feature), but later made plans to go direct-to-video. The basic plot involved Dante and Randal making a movie about their lives at the Quick Stop, a reference to the production of the original film. In an interview, Smith expanded on the delays surrounding the film. Apparently, when the Weinsteins left Miramax, owned at the time by Disney, the split was not completely amicable. The rights to the Clerks television show were still owned by the Disney company, who as a result were reluctant to work with The Weinstein Company, throwing the future of Clerks: Sell Out into question. At the 2007 Cornell Q&A, Smith said due to the Miramax/Weinstein argument "you will see a Jay and Silent Bob cartoon before Clerks: Sell Out." The plot of Clerks: Sell Out would eventually become the plot of Clerks III, which released in September 2022.

However, when Miramax was purchased by Filmyard Holdings in 2011, Smith revealed on Twitter that Miramax had contacted him for new projects, and the possibility of reviving the series came up. In October 2019, Smith announced that a repurposed version of the script for Sell Out would serve as the basis for the live-action Clerks III. In 2020, as a response to the COVID-19 pandemic, Smith teased about bringing the show back on Hulu.

== Reception and legacy ==
Clerks: The Animated Series was named the 98th best animated series by IGN, comparing it to Firefly due to its partial, out of sequence airing. They specifically praised the second episode for its parody of the old television staple of clip shows, by showing clips of the previous episode as well as clips from the episode itself.

In 2011, Complex included it on their list of "The 25 Most Underrated Animated TV Shows of All Time".

== Home media ==
The series was released in a two-disc collector's edition DVD set called Clerks Uncensored on February 20, 2001. The "Uncensored" refers to the restoration of a second episode segment cut from broadcast, as well as uncensored live-action wraparounds, introduced by Mewes and Smith, in character as Jay and Silent Bob. The DVD was given an R-rating by the Motion Picture Association of America for "some sexual humor".

== See also ==
- The Secret Diary of Desmond Pfeiffer - mentioned on the series multiple times
- Pop culture fiction
