= Jay and Silent Bob =

Fictional characters created by Kevin Smith

- View Askewniverse characters
- Jason Mewes as Jay (left) and Kevin Smith as Silent Bob in Clerks II
- First appearance: Clerks (1994)
- Created by: Kevin Smith
- Portrayed by: Jason Mewes (Jay); Kevin Smith (Silent Bob); Brian Andrew Saible (Baby Jay; Jay and Silent Bob Strike Back); Harley Quinn Smith (Baby Silent Bob; Jay and Silent Bob Strike Back)

In-universe information
- Aliases: Bluntman and Chronic, The Clit Commander (Jay only), Burn Boy (Jay only, by Randal), Lunchbox (Silent Bob only, by Jay)
- Gender: Male
- Alignment: Neutral (antiheroes)
- Family: Jay's Mother; Silent Bob's Mother
- Significant others: Justice (Jay's ex-girlfriend and mother of his child, Jay and Silent Bob Strike Back), Amy (Silent Bob's significant other that he had a falling out with because of her sexual history)
- Children: Millennium "Milly" Faulken (Jay's daughter with Justice)
- Relatives: Lester (Jay's cousin); Olaf (Silent Bob's cousin)

Jay and Silent Bob are fictional characters portrayed by American actors Jason Mewes and Kevin Smith, respectively. They appear in the View Askewniverse, a fictional universe used in most of the films, comics, and television programs written and produced by Smith.

Jay and Silent Bob are the only characters that have appeared in every Askewniverse film. This excludes Smith's other projects: Jersey Girl, Zack and Miri Make a Porno, Cop Out, Red State, Tusk, and Yoga Hosers. The characters are shown spending most of their time selling marijuana in front of the convenience store in the Clerks films. In Clerks: The Animated Series, they were also shown selling illegal fireworks.

== Character profiles ==
Jay and Silent Bob are fictional characters created by Kevin Smith, prominently featured in his View Askewniverse films. They first appeared in Clerks.

Silent Bob, portrayed by Kevin Smith, has a reticent nature, communicating mostly through gestures and facial expressions rather than speech. When he does speak, his comments are often poignant and insightful, providing critical reflections that influence the course of the narratives. Silent Bob is characterized by his long dark hair, beard, and a backwards baseball cap, and typically wears a long coat resembling a Jedi robe. Originally a smoker, the character has been shown to have quit in later films. His background includes being raised Catholic and possessing a talent for gadgetry.

Jay, played by Jason Mewes, contrasts sharply with Silent Bob. He is verbose, frequently using crude and offensive language. Jay's demeanor is outgoing and sometimes aggressive. He is slim, with long blonde hair, and typically wears a black knit cap in the later films. Jay's overt sexual behavior and ambiguous sexuality are a recurring theme in his character development across the series.

=== Fictional biography ===
Both characters are said to have been born in Leonardo, New Jersey, meeting during their infancy. Throughout the series, they are often seen loitering outside the Quick Stop Groceries and engaging in various misadventures. Jay and Silent Bob's roles often serve as comic relief, but also include moments where they drive the plot or deliver key thematic messages.

== Filmography ==
=== Clerks (1994) ===
Clerks, released in 1994, is the first film to feature Jay and Silent Bob. In the View Askewniverse timeline, it takes place the day after Mallrats. Jay and Silent Bob return to their primary business location in front of Quick Stop. Throughout the day, they are seen dancing, loitering, and harassing pedestrians. Silent Bob enters the store to buy powdered sugar while Jay goes inside to steal food. They deal marijuana to various people (including Willam Black), much to the chagrin of Quick Stop clerk Dante Hicks (Brian O'Halloran). In addition, the duo hangs out with Silent Bob's Russian cousin Olaf, who runs a heavy metal band and is looking to do a gig in New York City.

Aware of Dante's love triangle with Caitlin Bree and Veronica, Silent Bob says to him, "You know, there's a million fine-looking women in the world, dude. But they don't all bring you lasagna at work. Most of 'em just cheat on you."

The end credits of Clerks contain a reference to the return of Jay and Silent Bob in Dogma.

=== Mallrats (1995) ===
Although it was filmed one year later, the events in Mallrats occur one day before the events in Clerks. In the film, Jay and Silent Bob are loitering at a local New Jersey mall (filmed in Minnesota at the Eden Prairie Center Mall). There they are met by Brodie Bruce (Jason Lee) and T.S. Quint (Jeremy London), who have broken up with their girlfriends—Rene (Shannen Doherty) and Brandi (Claire Forlani), respectively. A local game show called Truth or Date is set to be filmed at the mall that day, which is to feature Brandi. Brodie asks Jay and Silent Bob to make sure the show does not happen, and Jay says they were going to destroy the stage anyway, for lack of anything better to do.

They make several attempts to destroy the stage but fail. Later, they help Brodie and T.S. win back their girlfriends. Jay incapacitates the male contestants on Truth or Date by getting them stoned, which allows Brodie and T.S. to take their places. Silent Bob overrides the production's video input, allowing him to play a videotape of Rene's new boyfriend, Shannon Hamilton (Ben Affleck), having sex with a minor. The film concludes with Brodie and T.S. reconciling with their girlfriends. Jay and Silent Bob walk off into the distance with an orangutan named Susanne.

In this film, Silent Bob is revealed to be an electronics expert and won a science fair in eighth grade by turning his mother's vibrator into a CD player using "chicken wire and shit".

After the credits roll, Jay and Silent Bob are announced to return in Chasing Amy.

=== Chasing Amy (1997) ===
Chasing Amy reveals that in the years since the events of Clerks, Jay and Silent Bob have found out that comic book writers/artists Holden McNeil (Ben Affleck) and Banky Edwards (Jason Lee) created a popular independent comic book series entitled Bluntman and Chronic starring the duo.

This film centers on Holden's romantic relationship with Alyssa Jones (Joey Lauren Adams), a self-identified lesbian. Though their love is initially passionate, the relationship begins to deteriorate when Holden discovers Alyssa's past. Toward the end of the film, Jay and Silent Bob meet Holden to accept their likeness rights payment, and during this meeting, Silent Bob tells Holden the story of his former girlfriend Amy.

In his longest speech to date, Silent Bob explains that, much like in Holden's relationship with Alyssa, he became distressed at the revelation of Amy's sexual past, specifically that she had engaged in threesomes. Upon discovering this, he broke up with her. Bob later realized he was not annoyed at her; rather, he felt inadequate given his lack of experience. By the time he realized this, it was too late, and she had moved on. He has since spent his life "chasing Amy, so to speak".

Moved by Silent Bob's story, Holden devises a plan to fix his relationship with Alyssa, but as in Silent Bob's past relationship, it is too late. Holden passes the reins of power over the Bluntman and Chronic comic and creates a new comic named Chasing Amy, based on the relationship.

The scene in which Jay and Silent Bob meet Holden at the cafe to accept payment is their only appearance in Chasing Amy. However, their voices were heard again during the end credits of the movie, which contained a reference to the return of Jay and Silent Bob in Dogma, released two years after the events of Chasing Amy.

=== Dogma (1999) ===
The events in Dogma take place after their disappointing adventure in the fictional Shermer, Illinois. These events are chronicled in the comic book story "Chasing Dogma". Jay and Silent Bob decide to go back home to New Jersey. Before they leave, they meet Bethany Sloane (Linda Fiorentino), a Roman Catholic abortion clinic worker who has lost her faith in God.

Though she is unaware of it, Bethany is the last living relative of Jesus. She has been charged with the holy quest of stopping two fallen angels, Bartleby (Ben Affleck) and Loki (Matt Damon), from entering a church in New Jersey. The angels were expelled from Heaven after Loki got drunk, quit his position as the Angel of Death, and gave the finger to God. They realize that they can exploit a doctrinal loophole and get back into heaven if they lose their wings, are absolved of their sins, and then die by some means other than suicide. Bartleby reasons that entering the church in New Jersey will automatically forgive all of their sins, as total remission of sins had been granted to whoever visited that specific church on a specific date, thus allowing them to return to Heaven. Though they do not know it, if the two were to return to heaven this way, they would overturn God's decision, thus "proving God wrong" and unmaking all of existence. The Metatron (Alan Rickman) tells Bethany that she is to follow two people who refer to themselves as "prophets". This is revealed to be Jay and Silent Bob, who rescue Bethany from some thugs. She believes they are the prophets due to mis-hearing Jay's statement that he "could have stayed in Jersey and at least made himself a 'profit'". Though initially only interested in sex, Jay and Silent Bob agree to let her come with them.

Jay and Silent Bob fulfill their roles as prophets. They predict the arrival of Rufus (Chris Rock), the 13th apostle, who was left out of the Bible because he was black, and they lead the others to former Muse Serendipity (Salma Hayek). They procure the divine instrument that will stop Azrael, and Jay reveals the location of God ("John Doe Jersey"). Ultimately, though inadvertently, they provide Bethany with the solution to preventing Armageddon. The Apostle Rufus also reveals that Jay entertains homosexual fantasies when masturbating. Jay reassures an uncomfortable Silent Bob, by explaining that he does not 'always' think about men. During the journey, they also encounter Bartleby and Loki, and a host of demons who (in rebellion against Hell) are trying to help the angels cause the end of the world. Silent Bob also speaks, saying "no ticket" (a reference to Indiana Jones and the Last Crusade) after throwing the rebel angels off a moving train, then being stared at by a speechless and concerned passenger.

Once at the church, Jay and Silent Bob, along with the others, try to stop the angels from entering. Loki has a change of heart and tries to help them out, but is killed by Bartleby. Though their efforts to fight Bartleby are unsuccessful (in fact, Jay accidentally helps Bartleby out by shooting his wings off with a MAC-10, turning him to a mortal), God (Alanis Morissette) arrives, and proceeds to set things in order. After Jay spouts an obscenity-filled tirade on Serendipity and Rufus, the movie ends with Jay suggesting that Silent Bob and he take Bethany to the Quick Stop.

The ending credits claim that Jay and Silent Bob would return in Clerks II.

=== Jay and Silent Bob Strike Back (2001) ===
Jay and Silent Bob Strike Back takes place eight years after the events of Clerks. Due to their excessive disturbances, drug dealing and starting rumors about Dante and Randal Graves (Jeff Anderson) being a gay couple, Dante and Randal file a restraining order against Jay and Silent Bob. It prohibits them from coming within 100 feet (30 m) of the Quick Stop or RST Video for at least a year. Having no place to loiter, they decide to pay a visit to Brodie (Jason Lee), where they learn that Miramax Films is making a Bluntman and Chronic film.

They visit Holden and ask for the money that belongs to them for using their likenesses in the film, only to find out that he sold his half of the rights to Bluntman and Chronic to the other co-creator Banky Edwards (also Jason Lee); after Holden introduces them to the internet, they also discover that a number of people have bashed the upcoming film and insulted the comic Jay and Silent Bob numerous times for being stupid characters, unaware that the comic characters are based on real people. Jay and Silent Bob decide that they must defend their honor, and embark on a road trip to Hollywood to stop the movie from being made and to protect their reputations, or at least get their money.

After being refused passage on a bus for not having tickets, they decide to hitch-hike there and stop at a local Mooby's restaurant, whereupon Jay falls victim to love at first sight with Justice (Shannon Elizabeth), an international jewel thief posing as an animal rights activist. Justice offers them a ride under the pretense that they are traveling cross country to release animals from an animal-testing facility, much to the unhappiness of her partners Chrissy (Ali Larter), Missy (Jennifer Schwalbach Smith), and Sissy (Eliza Dushku).

Once inside the facility, Jay and Silent Bob find a tranquilizer gun and the ape, an orangutan named Suzanne (a reference to the ending scene in Mallrats). After freeing her from her cage, Silent Bob becomes sympathetic for the other animals, so they let them loose, as well. In the meantime, the four women escape with the diamonds and place a bomb on the van; Jay and Silent Bob witness the van explode, and while assuming that Justice is dead, they manage to escape just as the authorities arrive.

Federal Wildlife Marshall Willenholly (Will Ferrell) arrives to take over the case, as it involves the release of animals. Suzanne is subsequently taken by the occupants of a car labeled "Critters of Hollywood". Jay laments that they will never see Suzanne again, only to have Silent Bob angrily, and loudly, explain that the sign on the car (also calling Jay a dumbfuck for not getting what Silent Bob's gesturing right after Suzanne was stolen was about) indicated that they will probably meet up with Suzanne in Hollywood.

They are eventually able to hitch a ride and make it to Hollywood. There, they evade a security guard (Diedrich Bader) and make their way through multiple movie sets, including Good Will Hunting 2: Hunting Season. They are reunited with Suzanne on the set of the then-fictional Scream 4, where Suzanne is playing the part of a masked killer.

Pursued by a group of security guards, they are able to escape by riding a bicycle over a ramp (a reference to the iconic E.T., the Extra-Terrestrial moon scene), propelling them through the window of a nearby building. By sheer luck, they land in the dressing room of James Van Der Beek (of Dawson's Creek) and Jason Biggs (of American Pie), who happen to be playing Jay and Silent Bob in The Bluntman and Chronic Movie; Silent Bob is appalled that his comic-book counterpart is being played by the "pie fucker".

After learning this, Jay and Bob form a huddle in the corner and decide to beat up Biggs and Van Der Beek, but while their backs are turned, Suzanne does this for them. Jay and Silent Bob then give the ape the tranquilizer gun and set her loose in the ventilation ducts.

They put on the Bluntman and Chronic outfits, so they will not be noticed, but are mistaken for Biggs and Van Der Beek, and are escorted to the set of the movie. Despite the fact that they do not know what they are doing, once on set, filming begins. Jay and Silent Bob battle with Bluntman and Chronic's nemesis, Cockknocker (Mark Hamill), eventually cutting off his hand.

At this point, Justice enters the set to confess her love for Jay and admits her profession as a professional jewel thief; an unassuming Jay forgives her and they kiss. Willenholly reappears with a shotgun, soon followed by Missy, Chrissy, and Sissy. Justice and Sissy fight hand-to-hand, while Missy and Chrissy get into a gun battle with Willenholly.

During the chaos, Jay and Silent Bob locate Banky and demand their money. After Banky refuses on account of Miramax paying him a lot of money for the film, Silent Bob breaks his silence and explains why Banky can be sued if he does not heed to their demands. Banky finally agrees to give them half of whatever he makes from the movie.

After the fight, Willenholly stands up, believing he has killed Missy and Chrissy. Suzanne takes this opportunity to shoot him in the buttocks with a tranquilizer dart, incapacitating him; Justice uses the situation to her advantage and offers Willenholly an opportunity to get into the FBI by turning herself in along with Missy, Sissy, and Chrissy, as long as she gets a reduced sentence and the charges against Jay and Silent Bob are dropped. He agrees and Justice tells Jay to wait for her.

Banky approaches Jay and Silent Bob and tells them that they are now rich. Jay expresses his displeasure at the fact that, despite all of their efforts, they were still unable to stop the internet insults. They decide that the only way to achieve this, using their newfound wealth, is to visit and beat up everyone who had insulted them, including children and members of the clergy, to the tune of "Kick Some Ass" by Stroke 9.

The ending credits claim that Jay and Silent Bob "have left the building".

=== Clerks II (2006) ===
Thirteen years after the events in Clerks, and five years after the events in Jay and Silent Bob Strike Back, Jay and Silent Bob are in their early 30s and have become devoutly sober Christians, prompted by an incident where they were arrested and forced to go to rehab.

Once out of rehab, they are clean, but continue to deal while trying to teach the word of God, in a manner similar to evangelists. In one scene, Jay even suggests to a couple of buyers that they should read the "Holy Fucking" Bible. The Quick Stop where Dante worked was burned in a fire due to Randal leaving the coffee pot on, and Randal and Dante moved over to the Mooby's fast food restaurant. Jay and Silent Bob follow the two there.

At the beginning of the film, Jay expresses some disillusionment at being a drug dealer and weighs on other ideas of what to do in life. At one point during the movie, Jay, knowing boredom is the first step to relapse, dances to the song "Goodbye Horses" by Q Lazzarus after Silent Bob puts the tape in the boom box. He parodies exactly the same dance done by Buffalo Bill in The Silence of the Lambs, complete with the "tuck", although it is alleged Jay has been doing this in real life before Silence of the Lambs was released.

Near the end of the film, they are jailed with Dante, Elias (Trevor Fehrman), and Randal, for a party at which a donkey show is hired to celebrate Dante moving away. Jay and Silent Bob were charged for possession of drugs, which violated their probation. They bear witness to Dante and Randal's fight in the jailhouse, but at first provide no meaningful help, with Silent Bob unable to come up with his usual wisdom and instead criticizing Jay for never contributing to a conversation. Randal wants to reopen the Quick Stop with Dante, but neither of the two has the money, so Jay and Silent Bob offer some of the Bluntman and Chronic movie royalty money under the condition that the two are allowed to loiter outside the shop and that the police cannot be called to arrest them. After the Quick Stop is reopened, Jay and Silent Bob return to where they started so many years ago, and promptly restart the "Goodbye Horses" routine.

=== Jay & Silent Bob's Super Groovy Cartoon Movie! (2013) ===
After winning $10 million from a scratchcard they bought at the Quick Stop, Jay & Silent Bob decide to become superheroes Bluntman and Chronic (a parody of Batman and Robin). They build a secret Fortress of Solitude beneath RST Video and acquire all the necessary gadgets and accessories to make them ideal crime-fighters. They also hire their own butler, Albert (a parody of Alfred Pennyworth).

Throughout their crime-fighting ordeals, they manage to accidentally create a few super-powered enemies of their own, who together form "The League of Shitters". The League of Shitters consists of Lipstick Lesbian, Dickhead, NewsGroup, Cocknocker, and the Diddler. While at a ceremony in which Bluntman and Chronic are to be awarded the key to the city of Red Bank, The League of Shitters attack the dynamic duo and knock them unconscious. They then attempt to infiltrate the "Bluntcave", resulting in the deaths of NewsGroup and Diddler (they are crushed by a wall that reveals the entrance to the hideout). Lipstick Lesbian mortally stabs Albert in the back and places Bluntman and Chronic into a giant bong that is slowly filling up with water. After leaving the heroes to die, the villains descend upon Red Bank, killing everyone in their path. Albert uses the last of his strength to free the heroes before dying.

Vowing to avenge Albert, Bluntman and Chronic fly to Red Bank in the Blunt Jet to save the city from The League of Shitters' mayhem. An epic fight ensues in which Bluntman subdues Dickhead by tricking him into entering a gay bar and Chronic kills Cocknocker with a broken beer bottle. Lipstick Lesbian draws a gun and attempts to shoot Bluntman and Chronic, but they are miraculously saved by a new heroine, Bluntgirl. Bluntgirl defeats Lipstick Lesbian single-handedly and begins to show romantic interest in Bluntman. Chronic is jealous and expresses his desire for anal sex. Bluntgirl agrees to this, however, she penetrates Chronic with a dildo, much to Chronic's distaste. Bluntgirl asks Bluntman if he's ever experienced anything of the like, to which he replies, "Yeah, when Ben Affleck played Daredevil.". During the credits, it is noted that "Jay and Silent Bob will return in Clerks III."

After the credits, Jay and Silent Bob are visited by Stan Lee, who wishes to speak to them about the "Avenger Initiative". Shortly after, they are all picked up by Doc Brown, who requests their help in getting back to the future.

=== Jay and Silent Bob Reboot (2019) ===
In the years after Clerks II, Jay and Silent Bob convert the former RST Video into a fake chicken sandwich shop, which they use as a front for an illegal marijuana dispensary. The film opens with them getting arrested, and subsequently lose a court case to Saban Films, who are making a new Bluntman and Chronic film, Bluntman V Chronic. The two also learn they have lost their naming rights, and can no longer self-identify as "Jay and Silent Bob".

Jay and Bob visit Brodie Bruce (Jason Lee), who tells them about the Bluntman and Chronic reboot, which is being directed by Kevin Smith. The film is largely completed, but a major scene is to be shot at the annual fan convention "Chronic-Con" in Hollywood. Jay and Bob have three days to get to Los Angeles to stop the film from being completed and win back their identities. The two depart for California.

They arrive in Chicago, where Jay learns his former girlfriend Justice (Shannon Elizabeth) works as a local weatherperson. Jay and Bob visit Justice, who tells Jay he left her heartbroken by never visiting her in jail. She has since married and given birth to their love child, Millennium "Milly" Faulken (Harley Quinn Smith). She introduces Jay to their daughter and her best friend Soapy (Treshelle Edmond) but urges him to never reveal his identity to her.

Justice leaves for vacation, and Milly forces Jay to take her and Soapy to Hollywood with him and Bob. Milly drugs Jay and Bob with a strong edible, and they wake up on a highway in New Orleans, where they meet Milly's two other friends, Jihad (Aparna Brielle) and Shan Yu (Alice Wen). They tell Jay that they want to visit Chronic-Con because Shan Yu is a huge fan of the first Bluntman and Chronic film and it is her dream to attend Chronic-Con. They steal a van and drive to California. Milly admits to Jay that her bad behavior is attributed to her never knowing her father.

Jay and Bob are abandoned by the group and set off in search of the van. They find it in a vacant area, where the Ku Klux Klan have kidnapped the girls and are having a rally. Bob steals a Klan hood and passes himself off as the new Grand Dragon to distract them using Alec Baldwin's speech from Glengarry Glen Ross while Jay rescues the girls. They throw a portable toilet at the Klansmen and flee.

The group makes it to Chronic-Con and sneaks in. Jay and Bob plan to ruin the shoot, while the girls want to be extras in the film to fulfill Shan Yu's dream. They agree to part ways, with Jay hugging Milly and letting her know he is proud of her.

After attempting to sneak past a familiar security guard (Diedrich Bader), Jay and Bob are pursued throughout the con. They hide in an empty panel room where they are met by Holden McNeil (Ben Affleck), who has just finished recording a podcast with Alyssa Jones (Joey Lauren Adams). Holden has donated his sperm to Alyssa and her wife (Virginia Smith) so they may have a child, whom he helps co-parent. Holden tells Jay that fatherhood gave him a new purpose. This inspires Jay to abort their mission and be a father to Milly. Holden gives them VIP badges, which grants him and the girls access to the panel with Kevin Smith.

Noticing that Bob bears a resemblance to Smith, Milly sneaks backstage and knocks out Smith, giving Smith's clothes to Bob as a disguise. They bring Milly and Shan Yu on stage to film the scene, but Shan Yu sees through their ruse and knocks Bob unconscious, bringing out the real Kevin Smith. Bob is thrown out of the hall and Shan Yu reveals herself to be a Russian spy, bent on destroying American pop culture conventions. Jay reveals to Milly that he is her father. Bob regains consciousness outside and steals a large metal "Iron Bob" suit that was to be used in the filming of the scene. Controlling the suit, Bob incites a riot at the panel and disarms Shan Yu and her henchmen.

After making their way back home, Jay shows Milly the Quick Stop and tells her the stories of his and Bob's adventures, including meeting Justice. Dante Hicks (Brian O'Halloran) arrives to open Quick Stop and bemoans the fact that the steel shutters are once again jammed closed. Jay then reveals it has been him and Silent Bob doing it the whole time.

=== Clerks III (2022) ===
Sometime later, Jay and Silent Bob open another (legally this time) marijuana dispensary in the former RST Video, although they still deal outside the store for old time's sake. The pair are recruited to appear as themselves in Randal's film about their lives at the Quick Stop, and also join in as cinematographers. Silent Bob has the idea to shoot the film in black-and-white, arguing that it will hide the poor color in the store while also exemplifying a metaphor for corporate culture sapping the color out of their lives. Jay proves to be a self-conscious actor, refusing to dance in a pivotal scene until everyone present on their small film crew leaves, and having trouble delivering the lasagna Aesop in his story to Dante, prompting an exasperated Silent Bob to offer to take the line (all of these, of course, referencing actual incidents during the filming of the original Clerks).

While filming the "salsa shark" scene, Jay and Silent Bob film Dante's outburst at first with interest, only to quietly turn off their equipment upon realizing they are witnessing an emotionally charged argument between him and Randal, which leads to Dante suffering a heart attack. They later help Randal distract the hospital staff so he can show Dante the final cut of the movie. After Dante's death, they attend his funeral along with Milly, who later joins Quick Stop as an employee. When Blockchain (Austin Zajur) and Elias's NFT is a hit, Jay and Silent Bob offer the two some marijuana to celebrate, before running off to fly a kite with them.

== Television ==
=== Clerks: The Animated Series (2000–2002) ===
Clerks: The Animated Series continues Jay and Silent Bob's adventures in front of the Quick Stop with Dante and Randal. In one episode, Jay and Silent Bob sell illegal fireworks instead of drugs. These events are not necessarily contiguous with events depicted elsewhere in the View Askewniverse. Silent Bob follows the film format and only speaks once during the episodes. In the show, it is revealed that Jay is 26 years old (a year younger than Dante and Randal), but still in the fourth grade, having been held back "a lot".

In most of the episodes, Jay and Silent Bob have some public service announcement videos, where they talk about safety tips, science lessons, or magic tricks. When they introduce themselves to kids, Charles Barkley also appears, but is immediately shooed away by Jay. In the "Science Sez" skit, Barkley attempt to tell a kid the importance of science, when Jay and Silent Bob arrive and beat him up, reminding him that only they do the segments. Silent Bob is more vocal in these segments.

In the series' final episode "The Last Episode Ever", Jay is revealed to be the show's animator, as he constantly redraws the physical forms of Dante and Randal (similar to one of Bugs Bunny's antics in Duck Amuck) toward the end of the episode.

== Comics ==
=== Clerks (1998) ===
The two appear in many of the Clerks comics in supporting roles.

- In Clerks: The Comic Book, Jay and Silent Bob's drug dealing is compromised by the recent popularity of Star Wars action figures. In an attempt to strike up business, the two hijack a toy store delivery truck and drive it into a secret compound behind the store. The two sell the figures at extremely low prices, ruining their value.
- In Clerks The Holiday Special, the two are seen working for Santa Claus, who is working in the apartment in between the Quick Stop and RST Video. The duo works on the toy-making machines.
- In Clerks: The Lost Scene, the two are seen in the bookend segments of the comic, which parodied the "Tales from the Crypt" comic books.

=== Chasing Dogma (1998–1999) ===
In between the events of Chasing Amy and Dogma, Jay and Silent Bob decide to go to be the "blunt connection" in Shermer, Illinois, (where most of John Hughes' films are set) because they believe that all the guys there are jerks and that there would be girls crawling all over them. They discover in Chicago that Shermer, Illinois, does not exist.

Since many of the events were reused in the 2001 film Jay and Silent Bob Strike Back, not all the events depicted here are necessarily continuous with those depicted elsewhere in the View Askewniverse.

=== Archie Meets Jay and Silent Bob ===
On March 7, 2025, Archie Comics announced that a crossover titled Archie Meets Jay and Silent Bob would be released in July. The story was written by Smith and features art by many Archie regulars.

== Video games ==
=== Jay and Silent Bob: Mall Brawl ===
In 2020, Interabang Entertainment and Spoony Bard Productions developed Jay and Silent Bob Mall Brawl, it was published by Limited Run Games for the Nintendo Entertainment System, and ported to Nintendo Switch, Steam and PlayStation 4. The NES release is the original release of the game, it even offered a cartridge version of it.

=== Jay and Silent Bob: Chronic Blunt Punch ===
In February 2016, Interabang announced the development of Jay and Silent Bob: Chronic Blunt Punch, a beat 'em up video game in the style of Castle Crashers featuring the title characters fighting through miscreants in the "mall of purgatory" down the street from the Quick Stop. In addition to combat, the game includes a means to use insults as finishing moves in combat. The game was developed with input from Smith and considered part of the View Askewniverse. Interabang used the Fig crowdfunding to raise $400k to complete the title, which successfully raised over $435,000 at the completion of the campaign.

After a long period with no updates (which included the acquisition and dismantling of the Fig platform by Republic), the game was released on April 20, 2026 for Windows, Switch (with Switch 2 compatibility), PlayStation 5, and Xbox Series X/S. Upon release, it retailed for US$19.99 for each version.

=== Jay and Silent Bob VR ===
In April 2018, Kevin Smith announced that he had signed a deal to make a live-action VR project for STX Entertainment's virtual reality division, STXsureal.

=== Other ===
Two mobile games featuring Jay and Silent Bob were released on IOS devices in 2012. One was titled Too Fat To Fly, in which Silent Bob is launched from a slingshot and must keep flying without hitting obstacles. The other was Let Us Dance, a dancing game in the style of Dance Dance Revolution. They have also appeared in two promotional videos for the 2013 tower defense mobile game Plants vs. Zombies 2.

Jay and Silent Bob appear in the comedy-adventure game Randal's Monday, released on November 12, 2014. Jason Mewes reprises his role as Jay in the game. Despite featuring these characters, as well as actor Jeff Anderson portraying the main character Randal, the game does not share a continuity with the View Askewniverse franchise.

Jay and Silent Bob appear as playable characters in the first-person shooter game Call of Duty: Black Ops 6 (2024), as well as their Bluntman and Chronic alter-egos.

== Other appearances ==
=== Film ===
- Scream 3 (cameo)
- Drawing Flies (Kevin Smith is credited as Silent Bob in the film. Jason Mewes also appears in the film, but as a different character. Smith's character wears the same leather outfit he wore in Mallrats.)
- Paradise Records (cameo)
- The Napa Boys (cameo)

=== Television ===
- MTV Mallrats Premiere Party
- MTV's Jay and Silent Bob Shorts
- VH1's I Love the '90s ("Jay and Silent Bob Re-name Your Favorite TV Show" and "Guys We'd Go Gay For")
- Degrassi: The Next Generation (appeared (with Alanis Morissette) for the filming of the fictional film Jay and Silent Bob Go Canadian, Eh? over three episodes in the fourth season, and returned for two episodes of the fifth season for the film's world premiere).
- Yes, Dear season 4, episode 19, Kevin Smith appears as himself in the show, but in the end does a little skit as Silent Bob.
- In The Flash episode "Null and Annoyed" (directed by Smith), Smith and Mewes appear as security guards who resemble Jay and Silent Bob.
- In That '90s Show season 2, Kevin Smith & Jason Mewes play characters similar to Jay & Silent Bob, weed dealers named Sonny and Bunch.
- In the season 8 Impractical Jokers episode "Hollywood", Smith and Mewes make a surprise appearance in one of the Joker's challenges, in which they pantsed Brian Quinn after he was unable to get a passerby to untangle his headphones in time.

=== Comic books ===
- Jay and Silent Bob made a brief appearance in the 2012 final chapter of Major League Chew, set in the Image Universe.
- Jay and Silent Bob made a brief appearance in one panel of Green Arrow (vol. 3) #6, standing outside Jason Blood's Safe House in Star City. This issue was written by Kevin Smith during his 15-issue run on the title character.
- Kevin Smith's Guardian Devil storyline in Daredevil (vol. 2) #1-8 contains multiple references to Jay and Bob. Their names are spelled on two speed dial keys on Matt Murdock's telephone (in Braille) in issue #1, under reviews on the back cover of The Catcher in the Rye in issue #4, and on a wall graffiti in issue #8. Issue #7 depicts Jay and Silent Bob themselves among the montage of film scenes, has their faces as likeness of special effects masks, and features a poster for the movie "Bob and Jay destroy Japan".
- Demonic versions of Jay and Silent Bob can be seen in one panel on the second page of Angel: After the Fall issue #5, standing outside of a cafe in the safe haven of Silverlake. Writer Brian Lynch confirmed the reference and attributed their inclusion to artist Franco Urru.
- They also appeared in the Star Wars Infinities comic Tag and Bink where they say they are from the Jedi Council.
- In a 2005 issue of Total Film, a comic strip illustrating Kevin Smith's version of the Passion of the Christ was published, featuring Jay and Silent Bob in the final panel.
- In 2001, The New York Times ran a comic book telling how Smith met and first kissed his wife Jennifer Schwalbach Smith. Jay and Silent Bob appear in one panel, promoting the then-forthcoming film Jay & Silent Bob Strike Back.
- Jay and Silent Bob made a cameo in issue #79 of Terry Moore's long-running comic book Strangers in Paradise.
- They also appear in a Desperate Times comic strip included in issue #53 of Savage Dragon.
- In June 2026, Jay and Silent Bob starred in the Marvel Comics one-shot Jay & Silent Bob: Jays of Future Past, a crossover written by Smith. In the lead-up to its release, Jay and Silent Bob made cameo appearances across various other Marvel titles, beginning with the 2025 issue of Giant-Size Amazing Spider-Man, also written by Smith.

=== Music videos ===
- "Can't Even Tell" by Soul Asylum
- "Build Me Up Buttercup" by The Goops
- "Because I Got High" by Afroman
- "Kick Some Ass" by Stroke 9
- "Problem" by Nova Rockafeller
- "You Can't Stop Me" by Suicide Silence (Jay only)
- "I'm Upset" by Drake
- "Loser" by Moby Rich
- "Highlife" by Logic

=== Music ===
- "Back to Me" by ¥$
