= Jersey Girl (2004 film) =

2004 film by Kevin Smith

- Theatrical release poster
- Directed by: Kevin Smith
- Written by: Kevin Smith
- Produced by: Scott Mosier
- Starring: Ben Affleck; Liv Tyler; George Carlin; Stephen Root; Mike Starr; Raquel Castro; Jason Biggs; Jennifer Lopez
- Cinematography: Vilmos Zsigmond
- Edited by: Kevin Smith; Scott Mosier
- Music by: James L. Venable
- Production company: View Askew Productions
- Distributed by: Miramax Films
- Release dates: March 9, 2004 (New York City); March 26, 2004 (United States)
- Running time: 102 minutes
- Country: United States
- Language: English
- Budget: $35 million
- Box office: $35.5 million

Jersey Girl is a 2004 American comedy-drama film written, co-edited and directed by Kevin Smith. It stars Ben Affleck and Liv Tyler with George Carlin (in his final live-action film appearance), Stephen Root, Mike Starr, Raquel Castro (in her film debut), Jason Biggs and Jennifer Lopez in supporting roles. The film follows a widowed man (Affleck) who must learn how to properly take care of his precocious daughter (Castro) after her mother (Lopez) dies during childbirth.

It was the first film written and directed by Smith not set in the View Askewniverse as well as the first that did not feature appearances by Jay and Silent Bob, although animated versions of them appear in the View Askew logo. At $35 million, not including marketing costs, it was then Smith's biggest-budgeted film, but was a box office bomb, grossing just $36 million. It was, however, Smith's second-highest grossing film at the time.

== Plot ==
Ollie Trinké is a media publicist based in New York. He falls in love with Gertrude Steiney and the two get married. After becoming pregnant, Gertrude dies from an aneurysm and complications during childbirth. Ollie names his daughter Gertie, after her.

Devastated, Ollie buries himself in work, spending very little time with his newborn daughter. His widowed father Bart steps up to take care of his granddaughter, taking a month off from work. He later decides to return to work to force his son to face both his grief and parental responsibilities. Under the stress of a botched diaper change and an inconsolable baby, Ollie publicly insults his client Will Smith, calling him a two-bit TV actor. This outburst occurs in a large press conference and costs him his job, while Smith, as he did in real life, goes on to become a massively successful movie star. Ollie and Gertie move into Bart's house in New Jersey. Ollie becomes blacklisted by every NYC public relations firm, forcing him to take a civil service job in their borough.

Seven years later, Gertie is now in elementary school. At a video store she and Ollie meet Maya, a graduate student and one of the store's clerks. Ollie and Maya begin a relationship with Gertie catching them in the act of making out. Ollie, now working with his father, helps win the approval of outraged citizens about a major public works project that will temporarily close a street in the neighborhood. This interaction makes Ollie realize how much he misses working in public relations. Seeking a change, he contacts his past protégé Arthur Brickman, who sets up a promising interview in New York City.

The prospect of moving back to New York creates tension between Ollie and his family, especially when they learn his interview is on the same day as Gertie's school talent show. After a big family fight, Ollie tells Gertie they are moving back to New York whether she likes it or not. Gertie angrily accuses Ollie of putting himself before her before declaring she hates him and wishes he had died instead of her mother. Enraged, he screams he hates her too, blaming both her and her mother for taking his life away from him and that he just wants it back, which causes her to get sad.

A few days later, Ollie and Gertie reconcile, apologizing for their hurtful words, and Gertie accepts that they will be moving to New York. While awaiting his job interview, Ollie has a chance encounter with Will Smith, who doesn't recognize him. Their conversation about work and their children convinces Ollie to skip the interview and leave for Gertie's talent show. Before leaving, he refers Smith to Brickman. Ollie rushes to Gertie's performance of Sweeney Todd arriving at the last moment. Ollie, Gertie, Bart, Maya and their friends then celebrate at a bar. There, he and Maya also talk about their feelings for each other. Ollie and Gertie also share a moment where Ollie tells her that he is not taking the job, and that being her father is the only thing he has ever been really good at.

== Cast ==
- Ben Affleck as Oliver "Ollie" Trinké, the single father of little Gertie who lost his wife after the birth of his daughter.
- Liv Tyler as Maya Harding, a graduate student at college who works at the video store, Ollie's new girlfriend and a mother figure to little Gertie.
- Raquel Castro as Gertrude "Gertie" Trinké, Ollie's daughter who is named after Ollie's late wife and Maya's friend.
- George Carlin as Bart Trinké, Ollie's father, who helps Ollie with Gertie
- Stephen Root as Greenie, Bart's friend
- Mike Starr as Block, Bart's friend
- Jennifer Lopez as Gertrude "Gertie" Steiney-Trinké, Ollie's first wife who died from a brain aneurysm when she gave birth to baby Gertie.
- Jason Biggs as Arthur Brickman, Ollie's one-time protégé now a successful publicist.
- Paulie Litowsky as Bryan
- Harley Quinn Smith as Trace Colelli
- Betty Aberlin as the emcee at the school talent show

Cameos

- Will Smith as himself
- Matt Damon as PR Exec.
- Jason Lee as PR Exec.
- S. Epatha Merkerson as Doctor
- Matt Maher as Delivery Guy

== Production ==
The film's budget included $10 million for Affleck and $4 million for Lopez. In the original draft of the script, Bruce Willis rather than Will Smith was the cause of (and eventual resolution to) Ollie's problems. Kevin Smith wrote the first fifty pages of the script with Bill Murray and Joey Lauren Adams in mind. The film was primarily shot in Highlands, New Jersey. Academy Award-winning Vilmos Zsigmond, its director of photography, was said by Smith to have been "an ornery old cuss who made the crew miserable." Paulsboro, New Jersey served as another of the shooting locations; scenes were shot there at its municipal building, Clam Digger Bar, and high school. Cut from it were scenes at Paulsboro's St. John's Catholic Church (now St. Mary the Queen Coptic Orthodox Church) and Little League Field. The scene in the church was to show the marriage between Ollie and Gertie; it was cut shortly after Affleck and Lopez split up in real life and their scenes were reshot, reducing her part due to concern over the poor box-office reception of Gigli.

It is the first major theatrical release to include a joke about the September 11 attacks: when Gertie asks to see Cats, Ollie refuses on the grounds that it is "the second-worst thing to happen to New York City." On the second episode of the podcast "Blow Hard with Malcolm Ingram", Smith tells a story of Malcolm sending him lyrics to "Landslide" by Fleetwood Mac, trying to apologize for an earlier incident. He was so touched by the email that he included the song in the soundtrack.

Jason Mewes, who plays Jay in the View Askewniverse films, was to have a part in the film as "Delivery Guy", but Kevin Smith had temporarily severed ties with him as part of a "tough love" approach to get him to quit using heroin following Jay and Silent Bob Strike Back (2001), making this so far the only film in Smith's filmography not to feature him, although archival audio of him is used for animated Jay during the opening "View Askew Productions" production logo. The role was given to Matthew Maher.

== Soundtrack ==
- "Everyone's A Kid At Christmas" – Performed by Stevie Wonder
- "Let's Stay Together" – Performed by Al Green
- "Parents Just Don't Understand" – Performed by Jeffrey A. Townes (as DJ Jazzy Jeff) and Will Smith (as the Fresh Prince)
- "That's How I Knew This Story Would Break My Heart" – Written and Performed by Aimee Mann
- "Swing Low Sweet Chariot" – Performed by George Jones
- "Worlds They Rise and Fall" – Performed by The Incredible String Band
- "Johanna" – Written by Stephen Sondheim
- "Wandering" – Performed by Ben Folds
- "Landslide" – Performed by Fleetwood Mac
- "My City of Ruins" – Written and Performed by Bruce Springsteen
- "High" – Performed by The Cure
- "Let My Love Open The Door (E.Cola Mix)" – Written and Performed by Pete Townshend
- "Jersey Girl" – Performed by Bruce Springsteen
- "God That's Good" – Performed by Ben Affleck, Liv Tyler, Raquel Castro, Stephen Root, and Mike Starr

== Release ==
The film is Smith's first to have received a PG-13 rating, rather than an R. According to interviews with Smith in the documentary This Film Is Not Yet Rated, it was originally given an R, due to the dialogue with Ollie and Maya discussing masturbation in the diner, but the decision was overturned. An extended cut was shown at Kevin Smith's private film festival Vulgarthon in 2005 & 2006. The extended version included much more of the Jennifer Lopez section, Ben Affleck's full speech at city hall, a longer ending, and some music changes. On the film's audio commentary, Smith stated that a longer version would be released within the next year. At a Q&A session in Vancouver in early 2009, Smith said that a release of the extended cut on DVD and Blu-ray Disc is "very possible”. In 2023, following Paramount Pictures’ purchase of Miramax, Smith announced that the extended cut would screen at his theatre ‘Smodcastle Cinemas’ in Atlantic Highlands, New Jersey as a one-night only event. As of 2026, this cut has not been released publicly.

== Reception ==
=== Box office ===
The film grossed $25.2 million in North America, and $10.8 million internationally, for a total gross of $36.1 million, against a $35 million budget.

=== Critical reception ===
Jersey Girl received mixed reviews from critics. The review aggregator website Rotten Tomatoes reported an approval rating of 42% based on 174 reviews, with an average rating of 5.30/10. The website's critical consensus reads, "A surprisingly conventional romantic comedy from Kevin Smith, Jersey Girl is warm but often overly sentimental". On Metacritic, the film has a score of 43 out of 100, based on 35 critics, indicating "mixed or average" reviews.

Smith was quoted saying his film was "not for critics". Smith's reaction to Jersey Girl after its failure was dour. He referenced the film during his cameo appearance in Degrassi: The Next Generation, jokingly telling Paige Michalchuk, whom his character had cut out of his fictional film Jay and Silent Bob Go Canadian, Eh!, that he cut Lopez out of most of Jersey Girl and wanted to cut Affleck out too, "but then it just would have been that little kid." In an interview on the Clerks II DVD, Smith noted "All these people were just trashing this movie's stars instead of looking at the movie itself. I get that a lot of people didn't like it but dude, I spent two years of my life on that movie."

The film was nominated for three Razzie Awards: Worst Actor for Ben Affleck, Worst Supporting Actress for Jennifer Lopez, and according to the press release, "Ben Affleck and either Jennifer Lopez or Liv Tyler" for Worst On-Screen Couple. Raquel Castro won a Young Artist Award for Best Performance in a Feature Film – Young Actress Age Ten or Younger, for her performance, and the film was nominated for Best Family Feature Film – Comedy or Musical, but lost to Christmas with the Kranks.
