= Zack and Miri Make a Porno =

2008 film by Kevin Smith

- Theatrical release poster
- Directed by: Kevin Smith
- Written by: Kevin Smith
- Produced by: Scott Mosier
- Starring: Seth Rogen; Elizabeth Banks; Craig Robinson; Jason Mewes; Traci Lords; Jeff Anderson; Katie Morgan; Ricky Mabe
- Cinematography: David Klein
- Edited by: Kevin Smith
- Music by: James L. Venable
- Production company: View Askew Productions
- Distributed by: The Weinstein Company
- Release dates: September 7, 2008 (TIFF); October 31, 2008 (United States)
- Running time: 102 minutes
- Country: United States
- Language: English
- Budget: $24 million
- Box office: $42.8 million

Zack and Miri Make a Porno is a 2008 American sex comedy film written, edited, and directed by Kevin Smith. It stars Seth Rogen, Elizabeth Banks, Craig Robinson, Jason Mewes, Traci Lords, Jeff Anderson, Katie Morgan, and Ricky Mabe. The film follows the lives of friends Zack (Rogen) and Miri (Banks), who are facing financial troubles and decide to make an adult film to solve their problems.

Zack and Miri Make a Porno had its premiere at the 2008 Toronto International Film Festival on September 7, 2008, and was released in the United States on October 31 by The Weinstein Company. The film received generally positive reviews from critics and grossed $42.8 million against a $24 million budget.

== Plot ==
Zack Brown and Miri Linky are roommates and have been friends since the first grade. Despite Miri's job at the local shopping mall and Zack's at a coffee shop, their utility bills have been unpaid for months. Their water is shut off before Thanksgiving, and their high school reunion.

At the reunion, Miri attempts to seduce her attractive former classmate Bobby Long, while Zack converses with Brandon St. Randy, Bobby's gay porn star boyfriend. After the reunion, the apartment's electricity is turned off. Inspired by Brandon and a viral video of Miri changing clothes for the reunion, Zack convinces a reluctant Miri they should make a pornographic film to earn money.

They decide to film a pornographic Star Wars parody, entitled Star Whores. Delaney, the film's producer and Zack's co-worker, rents film equipment and a building to use as a studio. After the first night of filming, the building is demolished, with all the equipment and costumes inside. The man that rented it to them has run off with the money. Later at the coffee shop where Zack works, he finds a hidden camera his boss installed, and decides to use it to replace their film equipment. Zack retools his film to take place in the coffee shop, revamping the film to one with a coffee shop motif, Swallow My Cockuccino. The group shoots the film after hours.

Despite insisting that they would not let sex with each other affect their friendship, Zack and Miri soon develop romantic feelings for each other. When it comes time for Zack and Miri to have sex on camera, they find that instead of the clinical sex enacted by the actors in the other scenes, their interlude is romantic and heartfelt. Later the next evening, Zack and Miri are about to discuss their reactions to the scene, when their apartment's electricity and water service return. The rest of the actors and crew reveal that they pooled their resources to pay one month of the couple's bills and are throwing them an early wrap party.

At the party, one of the other actresses, Stacey, asks Miri about asking Zack to have sex, since she's nervous about their upcoming scene. Miri realizes she has feelings for Zack, but approves Stacey's request. When Stacey relates this to Zack, the two retreat to Zack's bedroom, much to Miri's dismay.

The next evening, Zack is preparing a scene between Stacey and another actor, Lester, that was supposed to have been with Lester and Miri. Zack is dismayed when Miri insists on shooting the scene as originally planned. In the back room, an incredulous Zack asks if she is doing this to retaliate, pointing out that Stacey told him that Miri did not mind her sleeping with Zack. Miri corrects him, clarifying that she did not mind that Stacey offered to sleep with him. Perceiving this to have been some type of test, Zack admits that during the sex scene they filmed together, they were making love and emotionally connected, and that he loves Miri. When Miri does not reciprocate, Zack storms out, quitting the film and his job, and moves out of the apartment.

Three months later, Delaney goes to see Zack, now a goon in a costume letting people shoot him with paintball guns during Pittsburgh Penguins hockey games. Delaney convinces him to come to see the unfinished film and help complete it. Zack agrees, and learns that Miri never filmed her sex scene with Lester. Zack goes to Miri's apartment and reveals that he never slept with Stacey; instead, they talked about Miri all night. He proclaims his love to Miri, who reciprocates.

In a post-credits scene, Zack and Miri get married and, aided by Delaney and his worker's compensation settlement, start their own video production company, Zack and Miri Make Your Porno, which makes videos for amateur couples.

== Cast ==
- Seth Rogen as Zack Brown
- Elizabeth Banks as Miri Linky
- Craig Robinson as Delaney
- Jason Mewes as Lester
- Traci Lords as Bubbles
- Jeff Anderson as Deacon Anderson
- Katie Morgan as Stacey
- Ricky Mabe as Barry
- Justin Long as Brandon St. Randy
- Brandon Routh as Robert "Bobby" Long
- Tyler Labine as Drunk Willy
- Tisha Campbell-Martin as Angelina
- Tom Savini as Jenkins
- Jennifer Schwalbach as Betsy
- Gerry Bednob as Mr. Surya
- Kenny Hotz as Zack "Zack II" Knutson
- Betty Aberlin as Mrs. Copley
- David Early as Auditioner

== Production ==
=== Development ===
The genesis of Zack and Miri has been in Kevin Smith's mind since the 1990s. Two porn-centered projects were in development. One was a film called Name. It was intended to be a follow-up (not a sequel) to Chasing Amy that would have starred the trio from that movie, Jason Lee, Ben Affleck, and Joey Lauren Adams and to be set in the View Askewniverse. But the project was not made, and was replaced with Dogma. The second attempt was in 1997 as a failed 22-episode series titled Hiatus. The series would have starred Lee again, and was about a man returning home after being away in California and leading a double life as a porn star. When he pitched the series to television networks, they all rejected the idea believing that the kind of material handed to them could never happen on television. However, he kept the idea in mind and wrote a script following Clerks II that would be centered around porn.

=== Pre-production ===
According to Entertainment Weekly, The Weinstein Company (TWC) greenlit the project based solely on the title. Kevin Smith originally wrote the film to be set in Eden Prairie, Minnesota, where he had previously shot Mallrats, and where he had stated a desire to shoot again. However, for budgetary reasons, Smith opted to shoot in Pittsburgh, Pennsylvania and re-wrote the script to take place in the suburb of Monroeville.

The female lead role was written for Rosario Dawson, but she was unable to accept the part, as she signed on to film Eagle Eye, whose shooting schedule would have conflicted with Smith's. Smith wrote the role of Zack with Seth Rogen in mind, based on his performance in The 40-Year-Old Virgin. Shooting concluded on March 12, 2008.

There are numerous references to Pittsburgh and the film's setting in the neighborhood of Monroeville and Pittsburgh throughout the film, including a drunken Steelers fan, a Penguins Stanley Cup flag, Miri sleeping in a Penguins jersey and the cast drinking Iron City Beer throughout the film. A scene is set outside Mellon Arena during a hockey game. The scene of the goalie body checking the defender was filmed at the Rostraver Ice Garden, about 45 minutes from Pittsburgh, with Ice Garden's own 'Bo' as the ref. Another scene in the film was shot at the Monroeville Mall and contains a cameo appearance by Tom Savini. The mall was the setting of Dawn of the Dead, for which Savini was an effects artist. About the scene, Smith said, "We got to shoot at the Monroeville Mall, and for a movie buff, that's a very cool thing. We had Tom Savini [in cameo], we shot at the Monroeville Mall, it's as close to a zombie movie as I'll ever get." In the film, Zack plays hockey, and his team's name is the Monroeville Zombies, which is another reference to the George A. Romero film. One of the main cast members also has Pittsburgh-area roots: porn star icon Traci Lords (who played Bubbles in the film) is a native of Steubenville, Ohio, located about a half-hour drive west of Pittsburgh.

== Distribution ==
While Metro-Goldwyn-Mayer (MGM) was originally set to distribute the film, TWC solely distributed the film after a deal between the two companies fell through. With the announcement came the removal of the MGM logo from the advertising for the film, which is the first TWC film to be released after the deal was abruptly ended before the scheduled January 2009 date.

=== Rating ===
The Motion Picture Association of America initially gave the film an NC-17 rating for "some graphic sexuality". Smith submitted two additional cuts of the film with certain footage removed and was told the movie was getting much closer to an "R" rating, but that he should remove a small 14-frame shot first. Smith felt that the scene should stay in so he appealed the rating and the film was again screened by the MPAA. Seth Rogen commented "It's a really filthy movie. I hear they are having some problems getting an R rating from an NC-17 rating, which is never good." He continued, complaining that "They [fight against] sex stuff. Isn't that weird? It's really crazy to me that Hostel is fine, with people gouging their eyes out and shit like that ... But you can't show two people having sex—that's too much". On August 5, the rating was successfully appealed to an R with no further cuts. It attained the rating for "strong crude sexual content including dialogue, graphic nudity and pervasive language".

On October 10, 2008, the British Board of Film Classification issued an 18 certificate for the film, saying it "contains very strong language and sex references and strong sex."

=== Marketing ===
The Canadian release poster. This poster has been prohibited for use in American theaters by the MPAA.

On May 30, 2008, the first teaser trailer for the film was released on Smith's website, silentbobspeaks.com. The teaser depicts Rogen and Banks' characters as they hold auditions. In his online diary, Kevin Smith insisted it was strictly a teaser, mentioning, "There ain't a frame of footage in this puppy that's in the actual flick, so feel free to watch it without fear of 'spoilers'. This is just a little something to give you a bit of a feel for the flick." On July 21, however, the video was removed from the website following an order by the MPAA because it was designated a "teaser trailer" without passing through MPAA certification. On September 2, 2008, a red-band (R-rated) trailer of the film was released at IGN.

A poster for the film released in September 2008, which suggests the title characters are performing oral sex on each other, was prohibited for use in US theaters by the MPAA. The poster used in the US lampoons the film's explicit subject matter by featuring stick figures, with the explanation in the poster's text this is the only image that can be shown.

Despite this restriction, many media outlets refused to run the poster, or any ad that includes the word "porno" in the title, including a number of newspapers, TV stations, cable channels, and city governments, some of which responded to complaints about the ads at baseball stadiums and city bus stops. Many theaters displayed the film's title on their marquee as merely Zack and Miri. Weinstein Company marketing head Gary Faber stated that the ad was accepted in most of the outlets that were offered it, but that the studio would consider variations of the title for outlets that rejected it, including one version of the poster without the title that bears the slogan, "Seth Rogen and Elizabeth Banks made a movie so outrageous that we can't even tell you the title."

On November 10, 2008, The Weinstein Company announced that it would be re-launching the U.S. ad campaign for the film, with the main focus being a new poster that featured Rogen and Banks in a meadow with animals rendered in the style of children's animated cartoons. However, the new poster also took a jab at the controversy surrounding the image of the second poster—namely the controversy surrounding the use of the word "porno" in an image so seemingly kid-friendly—by including the statement "A poster for everyone who finds our movie title hard to swallow".

== Release ==
The film opened #2 behind High School Musical 3: Senior Year with $10.7 million from 2,735 theaters, an average of $3,906 per theater. The then-bankable Rogen experienced his "worst box-office opening ever". In an interview with Katla McGlynn of the Huffington Post, Smith himself observed:

I was depressed, man. I wanted that movie to do so much better. I'm sitting there thinking, that's it, that's it, I'm gone, I'm out. The movie didn't do well and I killed Seth Rogen's career! This dude was on a roll until he got in with the likes of me. I'm a career killer! Judd [Apatow]'s going to be pissed, the whole Internet's going to be pissed because they all like Seth, and the only reason they like me anymore is because I was involved with Seth! And now I fuckin' ruined that. It was like high school. I was like, 'I'm a dead man. I'll be the laughing stock.'

During its 13 weeks in release, the film grossed $42.8 million worldwide. Following the box office disappointment, Kevin Smith's relationship with producer Harvey Weinstein soured: "An associate says Smith bitterly blamed Harvey Weinstein for failing to spend enough to market the film. Although Weinstein said he spent $30 million on marketing, Smith didn't believe he had followed through. Either way, the relationship between the two frayed."

== Reception ==
Film review aggregator Rotten Tomatoes reports that 66% of critics gave Zack and Miri Make a Porno a positive review, based on 197 reviews, with an average score of 6.20/10. The site's consensus reads: "Zack and Miri Make a Porno is a modest success for Kevin Smith, due in large part to the charm of Seth Rogen and Elizabeth Banks." On Metacritic, the film has a score of 56 out of 100, based on 33 critics, indicating "mixed or average reviews".

Michael Phillips of the Chicago Tribune said the film "pushes its R rating pretty hard, though as with most Smith characters this side of Silent Bob, there's a lot more raunch in the talk — the sheer, voluminous, often hilarious verbosity — than in the action." A. O. Scott wrote that Smith "has been tinkering with the dirty-mind/soft-heart combination for quite some time, forming a link of sorts between the humanist sexual anarchy of John Waters and the smutty Victorianism of Judd Apatow." According to Scott:

[I]n spite of an avalanche of verbal filth (and a smaller quantum of the visual variety), Zack and Miri is not very shocking at all. He and his characters revel in dialogue that riffs on body parts and bodily fluids, but Mr. Smith's stories are bathed – metaphorically! – in syrup and schmaltz. So Zack and Miri Make a Porno, in spite of its sometimes tiresome, sometimes amusing lewdness, follows a gee-whiz romantic-comedy formula that would not be out of place on the Disney Channel. Two best friends who have always been in love with each other discover that ... they have always been in love with each other. Granted, this revelation occurs while they are having sex in front of a camera, but it is so sweet and predictable that these potentially tawdry circumstances hardly matter.

Roger Ebert of the Chicago Sun-Times gave the film 3 out of 4 stars and stated that, "Somehow Kevin Smith's very excesses defuse the material. He's like the guy at a party who tells dirty jokes so fast, Dangerfield-style, that you laugh more at the performance than the material."

=== Smith's views in retrospect ===
Both Smith and producer Scott Mosier were disappointed by the film's poor box office performance; according to Smith:

That was supposed to be the one that punched us through to the next level. Everyone thought it would do $60 to $70 million, and it wound up doing Kevin Smith business. I was like, "I'm done." If I were to write at that point in my life, it would be about the poor fat kid whose movie didn't make enough money.

For two months after the film's theatrical release, Smith did not work. He even stayed away from the Internet. Smith was "convinced the film would grasp a piece of the raunchy-comedy box-office success that had flowed freely to Judd Apatow the previous year for Knocked Up"; when it did not, Smith criticized Harvey Weinstein for not spending enough to market the movie, an allegation Weinstein denied, noting he spent $30 million marketing the film.

More than two years after the film was released, Smith said Zack and Miri is "literally me adulterating my own story ... the story of how I made Clerks, with porn."

Justin Long appears as a lawyer in Jay and Silent Bob Reboot. Smith confirmed that Long was reprising his role as Brandon and that the move was meant to retcon the earlier film into the View Askewniverse. Long's character was not named because Smith does not own the rights to Zack and Miri.

== Soundtrack ==
The Zack and Miri Make a Porno soundtrack features audio clips and music from the 2008 comedy. Another version of the soundtrack is available with the removal of all of the audio clips. This alternate version only has twelve tracks.

=== Track listing ===
1. "The Idea Comes...Hard" (film dialog) – Seth Rogen, Elizabeth Banks – 0:06
2. "Wynona's Big Brown Beaver" – Primus – 4:22
3. "Sex and Candy" – Marcy Playground – 2:51
4. "Steal My Sunshine" – Len – 3:31
5. "Salutations" (film dialog) – Elizabeth Banks, Justin Long, Brandon Routh, Seth Rogen – 0:21
6. "Smalltown Boy" – Bronski Beat – 4:05
7. "The Rosie Defense" (film dialog) – Elizabeth Banks, Seth Rogen – 0:12
8. "Just Like Honey" – The Jesus and Mary Chain – 3:00
9. "The Money Montage" – James L. Venable – 6:16
10. "Star Whores" (film dialog) – Jason Mewes, Seth Rogen, Elizabeth Banks, Craig Robinson – 0:19
11. "Fett's Vette" – mc chris – 3:24
12. "Meet the Producer" (film dialog) – Craig Robinson – 0:35
13. "Dreaming" – Blondie – 3:05
14. "Delaney's Lament" (film dialog) – Seth Rogen, Craig Robinson – 0:13
15. "Party Up (Up in Here)" – DMX – 4:29
16. "Hey" – Pixies – 3:31
17. "The Worst Porno You've Ever Seen" (film dialog) – Jeff Anderson, Seth Rogen, Elizabeth Banks, Craig Robinson – 0:21
18. "You and I Are a Gang of Losers" – The Dears – 4:51
19. "Ain't Love Grand" (film dialog) – Jeff Anderson, Craig Robinson, Tisha Campbell-Martin – 0:12
20. "I Love You" – Climax Blues Band – 4:02
21. "The Dutch Rudder" (film dialog) – Jason Mewes, Seth Rogen – 0:23
22. "We Don't Have to Take Our Clothes Off" – Jermaine Stewart – 4:39
23. "Parting Shot" (film dialog) – Seth Rogen, Elizabeth Banks – 0:18

=== Notes ===
A song by the band Live titled "Hold Me Up", which Smith has said he has been trying to use for over 13 years, appears in an "emotional scene" with Zack and Miri. Smith made a statement about featuring the song in the film:

It's an old song that I first heard in '95, when we were putting together the Mallrats soundtrack. It was actually in the film for the first test screening, but Live decided they wanted to hold onto it as a potential single off their next album (which would follow Throwing Copper). When I was editing Jay and Silent Bob Strike Back, the song had still never surfaced or been released, so I put in a request for it again. Again, I was denied. Third time, apparently, was the charm. Needed a song for that sequence in Zack and Miri and remembered the Live track. This time, the band signed off on us using the track. Took 13 years, but was worth the wait.

The song does not appear on the soundtrack CD, and would not be available on a commercial release for another decade until Live announced a 25th-anniversary reissue of Throwing Copper, with "Hold Me Up" as a bonus track.

An original song by mc chris called "Miri and Zack" was made for the film. An older song by mc chris, "Fett's Vette", was also used in the film, as well as "Sex and Candy" by Marcy Playground and Jermaine Stewart's 1986 hit "We Don't Have to Take Our Clothes Off".

== Home media ==
Although some copies of the February 2009 "2-Disc Edition" DVD were originally released under its full intended title in the United States, some DVDs were released under Zack and Miri, the censored title used to originally promote the film. The censored cover features a white background with a photo montage of the principal actors in the film; it includes a series of shorts called Money Shots, as well as other exclusive content; it contains no director's commentary, the first of Smith's films not to include one. The DVD also features 94 minutes of deleted scenes.

== Connection to the View Askewniverse ==
At the time of its release, Kevin Smith claimed the film did not take place in the View Askewniverse, and consciously tried to avoid any connections: View Askewniverse staples Jay and Silent Bob make no appearance, and Smith went so far as to not feature the Nails cigarette brand that was a recurring brand in the films. Smith later changed his mind by featuring Justin Long in an uncredited cameo appearance as Brandon St. Randy in Jay and Silent Bob Reboot as Jay and Silent Bob and Saban Films' lawyer. Though the character is never named, due to being owned by the Weinstein Company, Smith confirmed this appearance is him retroactively adding Zack and Miri Make a Porno to the View Askewniverse. In a deleted scene from Clerks III Jay mentions having a cousin named Lester who is a former adult film star, and has since switched to OnlyFans.
