= An Evening with Kevin Smith =

2002 film

- Written by: Kevin Smith
- Directed by: J.M. Kenny
- Starring: Kevin Smith; Jason Mewes
- Original language: English

Production
- Producers: Paul Apel; Alan Baral; Lisa Blond
- Running time: Disc 1: 128 min Disc 2: 97 min

Original release
- Release: 2002

An Evening with Kevin Smith is a DVD featuring question and answer sessions that the comedian and filmmaker Kevin Smith held with his fans at various American colleges in 2001/2002. The colleges were: Clark University, Cornell University, Indiana University, Kent State University and University of Wyoming. During the sessions, Smith answers questions regarding his movies, as well as his life. He discusses how he got started in the movie industry, how different films came about, his friendship with Jason Mewes, and his relationship with the media, fans, and various other celebrities.

== Plot ==
The film features numerous comedic stories from Smith's life at that point in his early 30s. Smith first unearthed stories such as his relationship with Warner Bros. and their famously unreleased Superman Lives. The story became the basis for a 2015 documentary. The story Smith tells involves producer Jon Peters wanting to include elements of generic blockbuster cliché in Smith's script, these include Superman fighting a large spider, a story point later included in Peters' box office bomb Wild Wild West.

Another story Smith recalls is of when he first met his future wife (Jennifer Schwalbach Smith) whilst promoting Dogma in 1999 and the birth of his daughter that same year. Smith tells of how he was physically injured the night he first slept with his wife, a fact he never told her until a full year into their marriage.

One of Smith's most popular stories from the DVD is of when he was unknowingly forced to make a near 5-hour long documentary for Prince about God and the evolution of man, both of which are two topics Smith has little to no involvement in. Smith reveals he was angry with the pop star towards the end of the week he spent with him, especially when he learns of the documentary never seeing the light of day, instead being put into Prince's vault which includes over 100 original music videos and hundreds of hours of music previously unreleased according to Smith.

== Release ==
The film was originally released on DVD on December 17, 2002.

In 2021, full HD shots from the film were seen in Malcolm Ingram's "Clerk" documentary. In 2022, the film became available on Canadian television network CTV's VOD service for the first time in 720p HD. On July 24, 2024, it was announced that Sony MOD would be releasing the film on Bluray for the first time on September 10, 2024. That release was ultimately cancelled, and no further details were provided.

== Reception ==
On Rotten Tomatoes the film has a 100% rating with 6 positive reviews collected. Joel Cunningham, writing for Digitally Obsessed, stated that the DVD was "essential viewing for any true fan of Jay and Silent Bob" and complimented Smith's abilities as a story teller. Adam Tyner of DVD Talk ranked An Evening with Kevin Smith as "highly recommended" though he noted that "at least some familiarity with Kevin Smith and his body of work is required to get much out of this two-disc set."
