= Afroman discography =

Discography of American rapper Afroman

- Studio albums: 19
- Extended plays: 4
- Live albums: 1
- Singles: 3
- Music videos: 13
- Mixtapes: 13

American rapper Afroman has released 19 studio albums, one live album, 13 mixtapes, four extended plays (EPs) and three singles.

== Albums ==
=== Studio albums ===
List of albums, with selected chart positions and certifications
Title	Album details	Peak chart positions							Certifications
Title	Album details	US	US R&B	AUT	FRA	GER	NZ	UK	Certifications
Fro-Ever	Released: 1997; Label: Foreman; Format: Cassette	—	—	—	—	—	—	—	
My Fro-losophy	Released: October 6, 1998; Label: None; Format: CD	—	—	—	—	—	—	—	
Because I Got High	Released: June 20, 2000; Label: T-Bones; Format: CD	—	—	—	—	—	—	—	
Sell Your Dope	Released: September 12, 2000; Label: T-Bones; Format: CD	—	—	—	—	—	—	—	
The Good Times	Released: August 28, 2001; Label: Uptown, Universal; Format: CD, LP, digital download	10	9	36	95	40	42	96	RIAA: Gold; RMNZ: Platinum
Afroholic... The Even Better Times	Released: April 20, 2004; Label: Hungry Hustler; Format: CD	—	99	—	—	—	—	—	
Jobe Bells	Released: November 30, 2004; Label: Hungry Hustler; Format: CD	—	—	—	—	—	—	—	
4R0:20	Released: December 14, 2004; Label: Hungry Hustler; Format: CD	—	—	—	—	—	—	—	
The Hungry Hustlerz: Starvation Is Motivation	Released: December 14, 2004; Label: Hungry Hustler; Format: CD	—	—	—	—	—	—	—	
Drunk 'n' High	Released: June 27, 2006; Label: Siccness.net; Format: CD	—	—	—	—	—	—	—	
A Colt 45 Christmas	Released: October 17, 2006; Label: Union Artist Group / Hungry Hustler; Format: CD	—	—	—	—	—	—	—	
Waiting to Inhale	Released: February 5, 2008; Label: Hungry Hustler; Format: CD	—	—	—	—	—	—	—	
Frobama: Head of State	Released: November 25, 2008; Label: Federal / Hungry Hustler; Format: CD	—	—	—	—	—	—	—	
Marijuana Music	Released: July 12, 2013; Label: Hungry Hustler / Joseph 'Afroman' Foreman; Format: CD	—	—	—	—	—	—	—	
The Fro-Rider	Released: May 13, 2014; Label: Hungry Hustler / Palmdale Publishing, Ascap; Format: CD	—	—	—	—	—	—	—	
Happy to Be Alive	Released: May 20, 2016; Label: Cleopatra / X-Ray; Format: CD	—	—	—	—	—	—	—	
Cold Fro-T-5 and Two Frigg Fraggs	Released: November 10, 2017; Label: Hungry Hustler; Format: CD, LP	—	—	—	—	—	—	—	
Save a Cadillac, Ride a Homeboy	Released: August 15, 2020; Label: Hungry Hustler; Format: CD, LP	—	—	—	—	—	—	—	
Lemon Pound Cake	Released: September 30, 2022; Label: Music Access, Hungry Hustler; Format: Digital only	—	—	—	—	—	—	—	
Getting It Back	Released: March 20, 2026; Format: Digital only	—	—	—	—	—	—	—	
Freedom of Speech	Released: April 20, 2026; Format: Digital	—	—	—	—	—	—	—	

=== Live albums ===
List of albums, with selected details
Title	Album details
Greatest Hitz Live	Released: June 10, 2008; Label: Siccness.net; Format: CD

=== Mixtapes ===
Title	Album details
Fro-Jams	Released: 2011; Notes: R&B Theme
Save a Cadillac, Ride a Homeboy	Released: 2011
The Prodigal Son	Released: 2011
Cross-Country Pimpin'	Released: 2011
Parking Lot Platinum Vol. III	Released: 2013
Pot Head Pimp	Released: 2013
World's Greatest Wino	Released: 2012
F#@% Everybody	Released: 2012
Dope Dealer Ditties	Released: 2012
Afro-D-Z-Acc	Released: 2012
Palmdale Love	Released: 2013; Notes: R&B Theme
Don't Sell Your Dope	Released: 2013
Los Angeles	Released: 2013

== Extended plays ==
List of extended plays, with selected details
Title	Extended play details
One Hit Wonder EP	Released: November 25, 2014; Label: Hungry Hustler, Fontana North
The N-Word	Released: March 17, 2015; Label: Hungry Hustler
Santa Cuz	Released: December 13, 2016; Label: Hungry Hustler
Famous Player	Released: February 1, 2023; Label: Hungry Hustler

== Singles ==
List of singles, with selected chart positions and certifications, showing year released and album name
Title	Year	Peak chart positions										Certifications	Album
Title	Year	US	AUS	AUT	BEL (FL)	FRA	GER	IRE	NZ	SWI	UK	Certifications	Album
"Because I Got High"	2001	13	1	1	1	2	1	1	1	2	1	RIAA: Platinum; ARIA: 2× Platinum; BEA: Platinum; BPI: Platinum; BVMI: Platinum; IFPI AUT: Platinum; IFPI SWI: Gold; RMNZ: Platinum; SNEP: Gold	Because I Got High
"Crazy Rap"	2001	—	99	41	39	—	37	7	—	76	10	RIAA: 3× Platinum; BPI: Gold; RMNZ: 3× Platinum	Sell Your Dope
"Palmdale Pimp"	2008	—	—	—	—	—	—	—	—	—	—		Frobama: Head of State
"One Hit Wonder"	2015	—	—	—	—	—	—	—	—	—	—		
"—" denotes a recording that did not chart or was not released in that territory.

=== Other certified songs ===
Title	Year	Certifications	Album
"She Won't Let Me Fuck"	2001	RMNZ: Gold	Because I Got High

== Music videos ==
Year	Video	Director
2001	"Because I Got High"	Cousin Mike
2001	"Crazy Rap"	Cousin Mike
2013	"Enjoyed Your Bud"	
2014	"Because I Got High" (Positive Remix)	
2014	"@OGAfroman"	Mike Snow
2014	"Call Me Something Good"	Fro-Budget Films / Mike Snow
2015	"I'm Your Brother"	Mike Snow
2015	"I'm Not the N-Word" (featuring Kam)	Mike Snow
2015	"One Hit Wonder"	Mike Snow
2018	"Cold Fro-T-5"	
2018	"Old and Fat"	
2018	"Play Me Some Music"	
2018	"Fro-G Kush"	
2020	"Thunderfucc" (featuring B Legit and Ron Bass)	Ron Bass
