= Loppybogymi =

- Also known as: Loppy
- Origin: Mobile, Alabama, United States
- Genres: Alternative metal
- Years active: 1988–1994

Loppybogymi (pronounced LAH-pee-bow-JYE-me, often just shortened to "Loppy") was a Mobile, Alabama-based alternative metal band made up of Tim Ramenofsky (vocals, guitar), James Orr (bass, vocals), and Gregory Slay (drums, vocals).

== History ==
=== Formation ===
Loppybogymi was formed in Mobile, Alabama by Tim Ramenofsky, James Orr, and Gregory Slay in 1988. Frustrated by lack of national exposure the band relocated to Nashville, Tennessee in September 1991.

=== Disbandment ===
The band broke up in 1994. Gregory Slay went on to join Remy Zero. Tim Ramenofsky relocated to Hattiesburg, MS and founded the independent record label, T-Bones Records, most notable for releasing Afroman's first two albums, Because I Got High and Sell Your Dope.

== Members ==
Original Trio:

- Tim Ramenofsky - guitar, vocals
- James Orr - bass, vocals
- Gregory Slay - drums, vocals

Subsequent Members:

- Rick Ranson - Bass (Summer'92)
- Raymond Pitts - bass, trombone, vocals ('92-'94)
- Dave Feathers - drums ('93)
- Michael Gilfone - drums ('93-'94)
- Marty Medved -bass ('94)

Studio albums

- Scenic Overlook (1990)
- Kelbin: Mississippi Burning Tapes (1992)
- Tup (album) (1992)

EPs

- Boogy Whip (1989)
- Am I Catl? (1991)
- Hot Pink Lantin (1992)

Singles

- Middleworld (single) (1992)
- Undoing/Rubbermade (1992)

Live Recordings

- Loppy Lives, Vol 1 (2014)
- Loppy Lives, Vol 2 (2014)
- Loppy Lives, Vol 3 (2014)
