= Pound Cake =

Pound cake is a type of cake made using equal weights of flour, butter, eggs and sugar.

Pound Cake or Poundcake(s) may also refer to:

- Pound Cake speech, a speech made by Bill Cosby
- "Pound Cake / Paris Morton Music 2", a song by Drake
- Pound Cake (My Little Pony), a My Little Pony character
- "Poundcake", a song by Van Halen
- Poundcake (album), an album by Alaska Thunderfuck
- Poundcakes (Marvel Comics), a comic book supervillainess
- Nurse Poundcake, a character in the animated series Adventure Time episode "The Diary"
- Lemon Pound Cake an album and single by Afroman
