= Rucka Rucka Ali =

Israeli-American musician, comedian and YouTuber (born 1987)

Rucka Rucka Ali רוקה רוקה עלי
- Born: January 27, 1987 (age 39); Jerusalem
- Origin: West Bloomfield Township, Michigan, U.S.
- Occupations: Rapper; singer; radio personality; comedian; YouTuber
- Years active: 2006–present
- Labels: Straightsavage; Red Shoes; Pinegrove; Serchlite
- Website: ruckasworld.com

YouTube information
- Channel: itsRucka
- Years active: 2007–present
- Genres: Music video; parody music; satire; dark humor; comedy
- Subscribers: 2.01 million
- Views: 603 million
- Last updated: 18th September, 2026

Rucka Rucka Ali (Hebrew: רוקה רוקה עלי; born January 27, 1987) is an Israeli-American rapper, singer, radio personality, comedian, YouTuber, and parodist. He has released eight independent studio albums, four of which have charted on the Billboard Top Comedy Albums. As of July 2026, he has amassed 603+ million views and 2.02 million subscribers on his main music channel on YouTube. He has been banned from YouTube multiple times for content deemed by the corporation to violate its hate speech policy.

== Early life ==
Rucka Rucka Ali was born in Jerusalem on January 27, 1987, to an Orthodox Jewish family, but stated he distanced himself from the religion as he grew up.

== Career ==
Rucka Rucka Ali has released eight total albums, four of which have charted in the Billboard Top Comedy Albums chart: I'm Black, You're White & These Are Clearly Parodies (No. 6 peak), Probably Racist (No. 11), Rucka's World (No. 8), and Black Man of Steal (No. 7). During the weeks of July 31, 2010 through August 7, 2010, Rucka Rucka Ali held 5 of the top 10 spots on the Billboard Comedy Digital Tracks chart.

In June 2010, three British students were reprimanded after publicly showing Rucka Rucka Ali's music video for his parody "Ima Korean" to their class while studying different countries' musical traditions. One South Korean student was "devastated, upset, very offended, and feeling very lonely", being the only East Asian child in the class. An assistant headteacher, Len Idle, said the song was "probably racist". Rucka Rucka Ali subsequently used the quote as the title of his next album, Probably Racist.

On July 24, 2013, Rucka Rucka Ali released the song "Zayn Did 9/11" (a parody of Selena Gomez's "Come & Get It") to YouTube. The song mocked then One Direction member Zayn Malik, jokingly saying he committed the September 11 terrorist attacks, a reference to his British-Pakistani background. The single-cover features a silhouette of Malik in front of the Twin Towers of the World Trade Center during the attacks. The song, along with an accompanying music video released several days later, angered One Direction fans and others. Business Standard called the song "offensive" and a "racist attack" on Malik.

In the end of November 2013, he was involved in another controversy after his song "Only 17", a parody of "Just a Dream" by Nelly, was accidentally played uncensored over the speakers at a McDonald's company in Wales. Subsequently, McDonald's issued an apology to the offended customers. That same week, Rucka Rucka Ali responded to the controversy on his YouTube channel by jokingly demanding a personal apology from the restaurant.

On August 13, 2024, a German right-wing YouTuber, known online as Shlomo Finkelstein, was charged and sentenced to prison for "inciting racial hatred" for creating a video where he set a Koran on fire and urinated on it. According to his podcast co-host, a contributing reason for his arrest was that he played Rucka Rucka Ali's song "What Does the Black Say" on a livestream.

== Discography ==
=== Albums ===
==== Studio albums ====
Title	Year	Peak chart positions
Title	Year	US Comedy
Straight Outta West B	2008	—
I'm Black, You're White & These Are Clearly Parodies	2010	6
A Very Rucka Christmas	2010	—
Probably Racist	2011	11
Prehistory of Rucka	2011	—
A Very Rucka Christmas: The 2nd Cumming	2011	—
Rucka's World	2012	8
Black Man of Steal	2015	7
Everything Is Racist	2017	—
The Fried Chicken	2019	—
Black Manthology	2021	7
KSWhy	2023	—
We Fuck The Earth	2025	—
"—" denotes a recording that did not chart.

=== Singles ===
==== As lead artist ====
Year	Title	Parody of
2008	"I Can Do Whatever I'm White"	"Whatever You Like" by T.I.
2008	"I Wanna Blow Up China (Na Na)"	"Right Now (Na Na Na)" by Akon
2009	"Ching Chang Chong" (featuring DJ Not Nice)	"Boom Boom Pow" by Black Eyed Peas
2009	"I Don't Like White People"	"Dead and Gone" by T.I.
2009	"Red Rocks"	"Let It Rock" by Kevin Rudolf
2009	"Emo (Like a Nazi)"	"Paparazzi" by Lady Gaga
2009	"Ima Korean" (featuring DJ Not Nice)	"I Gotta Feeling" by Black Eyed Peas
2010	"Go Cops!"	"Tik Tok" by Kesha
2010	"Don't Be A Playa Haiti"	"Replay" by Iyaz
2010	"I'm Chinee"	"Imma Be" by Black Eyed Peas
2010	"Let's Go Jesus!"	"Blah Blah Blah" by Kesha
2010	"I Love Minorities"	"California Gurls" by Katy Perry
2010	"Justin's Beaver"	"Magic" by B.o.B ft. Rivers Cuomo
2010	"Justin's Beaver II (The Beaver Strikes Back) [feat. DJ Not Nice & Toby Queef]"	"Magic" by B.o.B ft. Rivers Cuomo
2010	"Only 17"	"Just A Dream" by Nelly
2010	"Jew Boy"	"Empire State of Mind" by Jay-Z ft. Alicia Keys
2011	"Eff Australia"	"Black and Yellow" by Wiz Khalifa
2011	"Osama Bin Found"	"E.T." by Katy Perry
2011	"Justin's Beaver the Movie"	"S&M" by Rihanna
2011	"(Rebecca’s Black) High Day"	"Friday" by Rebecca Black
2011	"Canada"	"Day 'n' Nite" by Kid Cudi
2011	"Russia's Gay"	"Whatcha Say" by Jason Derulo
2011	"iWhack (feat. Toby Queef)"	"Grenade" by Bruno Mars
2011	"SuperAIDS (feat. Ricola Volvos)"	"Super Bass" by Nicki Minaj
2011	"Hitler's Suicide Note"	"The One That Got Away" by Katy Perry
2012	"My Name's Obama"	"Call Me Maybe" by Carly Rae Jepsen
2012	"My Korea's Over"	"International Love" by Pitbull ft. Chris Brown
2012	"In The Jungle (feat. Joseph Kony)"	"Stronger (What Doesn't Kill You)" by Kelly Clarkson
2012	"Booty Call"	"What Makes You Beautiful" by One Direction
2012	"Free Kony, Dog (feat. Joseph Kony)"	"Part Of Me" by Katy Perry
2012	"Celebs Kill Yerself"	"Sweet Dreams" by Beyoncé
2012	"Rucka & Friends"	"Barney & Friends" by Barney
2012	"If I Was Mongolian (feat. DJ Not Nice)"	"Boyfriend" by Justin Bieber
2012	"Taquitos (feat. Alejandro Whereizwaldo)"	"Alejandro" by Lady Gaga
2012	"Hippies Always Smell Like Balls (feat. Toby Queef)"	"3" by Britney Spears
2012	"Fat Violent Dykes"	"Last Friday Night (T.G.I.F.)" by Katy Perry
2012	"(YouTube Took My #1 Video) Down" (feat. DJ Not Nice & Lil Wang)	"Down" by Jay Sean ft. Lil Wayne
2012	"Anne Frank Bash 2012 (I'm A Jew)"	"Sugar" by Flo Rida
2012	"Hey Mom (Where’s Dad)"	—
2012	"Jews & Faggots"	"Moves like Jagger" by Maroon 5 ft. Christina Aguilera
2012	"I'ma Dirty Iraqi (feat. Jihad Joe)"	"Sorry For Party Rocking" by LMFAO
2012	"Dago (feat. Nigariga Tony)"	"Payphone" by Maroon 5
2012	"Stars"	—
2012	"Some Black Guy"	"Good Feeling" by Flo Rida
2012	"iLost My Jobs (feat. Toby Queef)"	"Someone Like You" by Adele
2012	"Why Did Jesus Kill My Mother's Baby"	"Love You Like A Love Song" by Selena Gomez & The Scene
2012	"Without Jew"	"Without You" by David Guetta
2012	"I Know A Black Guy"	"Miss Independent" by Ne-Yo
2012	"We Drive Drunk"	"We Are Young" by fun. feat. Janelle Monae
2012	"I Wanna Rape"	"Wide Awake" by Katy Perry
2012	"Brony Style (I’ma Pedophile)"	"Gangnam Style" by Psy
2013	"I'm Obama"	"Thrift Shop" by Macklemore & Ryan Lewis ft. Wanz
2013	"Smack My Bitch"	"Catch My Breath" by Kelly Clarkson
2013	"I'm Osama"	"Thrift Shop" by Macklemore & Ryan Lewis ft. Wanz
2013	"Minecraft Won't Add Inches To Your Cock"	"My Songs Know What You Did in the Dark (Light Em Up)" by Fall Out Boy
2013	"Kim Jong Un Song"	"Cruise" by Florida Georgia Line ft. Nelly
2013	"Zayn Did 9/11"	"Come & Get It" by Selena Gomez
2013	"AMA on Reddit"	"Come & Get It" by Selena Gomez
2013	"Coincidental Racist"	"Same Love" by Macklemore & Ryan Lewis ft. Mary Lambert
2013	"Crapping"	"Happy" by Pharrell Williams
2013	"Because I'm White"	"Because I Got High" by Afroman
2013	"Al Qaedirection"	"Die Young" by Kesha
2013	"Obama Been Watchin’"	"Blurred Lines" by Robin Thicke
2013	"I Have A Little Cock"	"Applause" by Lady Gaga
2013	"What The Black Says"	"The Fox (What Does the Fox Say?)" by Ylvis
2014	"Ginger"	"Timber" by Pitbull ft. Kesha
2014	"I'm Just A Teenage Mutant, Ninja"	"Teenage Dirtbag" by Wheatus
2014	"Eff Germany"	"Talk Dirty" by Jason Derulo
2014	"Wigger"	"Wiggle" by Jason Derulo ft. Snoop Dogg
2014	"In The Sun"	—
2014	"Ebola (La La)"	"L.A. Love (La La)" by Fergie ft. YG
2014	"Just Like Black Peoples"	"Animals" by Maroon 5
2014	"I Love Michelle"	"I" by Kendrick Lamar
2014	"All About That Rice"	"All About That Bass" by Meghan Trainor
2015	"Talking Chinese"	"Talking Body" by Tove Lo
2015	"Ur A Cartoonist"	"Lips Are Movin" by Meghan Trainor
2015	"Jared The Footlong Lover"	"Cool for the Summer" by Demi Lovato
2015	"I've Got Cancer"	"Fancy" by Iggy Azalea
2015	"Niggas"	"Levels" by Nick Jonas
2015	"All About That Rape"	"All About That Bass" by Meghan Trainor
2015	"Living In The Vatican"	"Hall of Fame" by The Script
2015	"Peeing On The French"	"Confident" by Demi Lovato
2015	"Herro"	"Hello" by Adele
2016	"Shvartza"	"My House" by Flo Rida
2016	"Full Of Crap"	"Everywhere You Look" by Jesse Frederick
2016	"Dagowops"	"As Days Go By" by Jesse Frederick
2016	"I Know That You'll Miss Obama"	"I Know What You Did Last Summer" by Shawn Mendes ft. Camila Cabello
2016	"Star Wars Is Kinda Gay"	"Hide Away" by Daya
2016	"I Got HIV"	"I Want to Break Free" by Queen
2016	"I'm Really White, Dude"	"I Really Like You" by Carly Rae Jepsen
2016	"I Say Herro"	"No" by Meghan Trainor
2016	"I H8 Nickelback"	"Beg for It" by Iggy Azalea
2016	"Trump"	"Stitches" by Shawn Mendes
2016	"KSI (You're The Gayest Guy)"	—
2016	"My Name's Donnie Trump"	"Stressed Out" by Twenty One Pilots
2016	"Feel the Bern (When You Pee)"	"Work" by Rihanna ft. Drake
2016	"Sweatshop"	"Sweatshirt" by Jacob Sartorius
2016	"Fucka Zombie"	"Focus" by Ariana Grande
2016	"We'll Nig"	"Go West" by The Village People
2016	"Can't Stop Stealing"	"Can't Stop the Feeling!" by Justin Timberlake
2016	"Blowing Up"	"Dammit" by Blink 182
2016	"Life Is Over"	"Closer" by The Chainsmokers ft. Halsey
2016	"Bro Bro I'm Armenian"	"Go Go Power Rangers" by Ron Wasserman
2016	"Lars Is Gay"	"The Memory Remains" by Metallica
2017	"Vegans"	"Heathens" by Twenty One Pilots
2017	"Grab America by the Pussy"	"Sit Still, Look Pretty" by Daya
2017	"Heroes & Trolls"	"All Star" by Smash Mouth
2017	"Kan's Gay"	"My Way" by Calvin Harris
2017	"Hitler Is PewDiePie"	"Scars to Your Beautiful" by Alessia Cara
2017	"Everything Is Racist"	"Everything Is Awesome" by Tegan and Sara for The Lego Movie
2017	"iPhones Gay"	"Why Don't You Get a Job?" by The Offspring
2017	"ISIS ISIS Baby"	"Ice Ice Baby" by Vanilla Ice
2017	"Leafy Is Literally"	"Crawling" by Linkin Park
2017	"It's Very Gay Bro"	"It's Everyday Bro" by Jake Paul ft. Team 10
2017	"Milo's Gay"	"Paris" by The Chainsmokers
2017	"Sargon"	"Starboy" by The Weeknd ft. Daft Punk
2017	"1 Up! ~ Mario Song"	—
2017	"I'm in the Illuminati"	"Shape of You" by Ed Sheeran
2017	"Dear White People"	"Despacito (Remix)" by Luis Fonsi & Daddy Yankee ft. Justin Bieber
2017	"I'm Racist (In No Way Whatsoever)"	"Body Like a Back Road" by Sam Hunt
2017	"Treat Jew Better"	"Treat You Better" by Shawn Mendes
2017	"Prince Ali Obama"	"Prince Ali" by Robin Williams for Aladdin
2017	"Party in the TSA"	"Party in the U.S.A." by Miley Cyrus
2017	"All I Do Is Game"	"Stay" by Zedd ft. Alessia Cara
2017	"Not My Fault (That We Black)"	"There's Nothing Holdin' Me Back" by Shawn Mendes
2017	"I'm Thainese (Not Chinese)"	"Sorry Not Sorry" by Demi Lovato
2018	"China Na Na" (featuring DJ Not Nice)	"Havana" by Camila Cabello ft. Young Thug
2018	"Logan Dindu Nuffin"	"New Rules" by Dua Lipa
2018	"This Is Why We Can't Have Rice Things"	"This Is Why We Can't Have Nice Things" by Taylor Swift
2018	"History of Philosophy Rap"	—
2018	"Aluwakbar"	"Rockstar" by Post Malone ft. 21 Savage
2018	"Eat a D"	"Meant to Be" by Bebe Rexha ft. Florida Georgia Line
2018	"AIDS in Africa"	"Africa" by Toto
2018	"Netherlands Gay"	"Whatever It Takes" by Imagine Dragons
2018	"White People Can't Even"	"The Middle" by Zedd ft. Maren Morris & Grey
2018	"Kim & I"	"Him & I" by G-Eazy ft. Halsey
2018	"Believe Her"	"Believer" by Imagine Dragons
2019	"I Can Do Whatever I'm White 2"	"Whatever You Like" by T.I.
2019	"Destroyed With Facts And Logic"	"7 Rings" by Ariana Grande
2019	"Ching Chang Chong 2" (feat DJ Not Nice)	"Boom Boom Pow" by Black Eyed Peas
2019	"Knuckles My Nucka"	"Green Hill Zone Theme" by Masato Nakamura
2019	"Sleeping With Michael"	"Sweet But Psycho" by Ava Max
2019	"I Can't Lose Weight"	"Lost in the Fire" by Gesaffelstein ft. The Weeknd
2019	"Harambe Forever"	"The Greatest" by Sia ft. Kendrick Lamar
2019	"Old Town Grope"	"Old Town Road" by Lil Nas X
2019	"Don't Call Me Ginger"	"Don't Call Me Angel" by Ariana Grande ft. Miley Cyrus & Lana Del Rey
2019	"We Fuck the Earth"	"Earth" by Lil Dicky
2019	"White Men"	"Truth Hurts" by Lizzo
2019	"Deportito"	"Despacito (Remix)" by Luis Fonsi & Daddy Yankee ft. Justin Bieber
2020	"I'm the Black Guy"	"Bad Guy" by Billie Eilish
2020	"Boomerz"	"All the Good Girls Go to Hell" by Billie Eilish
2020	"Corona (Na Na)"	"L.A. Love (La La)" by Fergie ft. YG
2020	"Corn Virus"	"Panini" by Lil Nas X
2020	"Trump for More Years?"	"Dance Monkey" by Tones & I
2020	"Conscious Rapper"	—
2020	"Black God"	"Rap God" by Eminem
2020	"I'm Always Mean to Jew"	"Mood" by 24kGoldn ft. Iann Dior
2021	"Kant vs. Rand"	—
2021	"I Watch Anime"	"Bang!" by AJR
2021	"Have You Seen John Connor?"	"Use Somebody" by Kings of Leon
2021	"Kobe"	"Montero (Call Me by Your Name)" by Lil Nas X
2021	"I'm Gay"	"Go Crazy" by Chris Brown & Young Thug
2021	"We Blew Up"	"Beautiful People" by Ed Sheeran ft. Khalid
2021	"Life Online"	"Dynamite" by BTS
2021	"Black Friend"	"Best Friend" by Saweetie ft. Doja Cat
2021	"Therefore I Trans"	"Therefore I Am" by Billie Eilish
2021	"Goo 4 U"	"Good 4 U" by Olivia Rodrigo
2021	"Ayrab's Paradise"	"Gangsta's Paradise" by Coolio
2021	"I Miss Jew"	"Lose" by KSI & Lil Wayne
2021	"Basket Balls Gay"	"Build a Bitch" by Bella Poarch
2021	"Xi Ping Little Dick Funny Song with Kim Jong"	"Lil Bit" by Florida Georgia Line ft. Nelly
2021	"Don't Worry About Norway"	"Don't Worry" by Madcon
2021	"Stalin Song"	"Peaches" by Justin Bieber ft. Daniel Caesar & Giveon
2021	"Danny Tanner Rap"	"Marshall Mathers" by Eminem
2022	"I Live in Haiti"	"Levitating" by Dua Lipa ft. DaBaby
2022	"I Don't Like Liechtenstein"	"ABCDEFU" by Gayle
2022	"Bob Is Dead"	"Barbara Ann" by The Beach Boys
2022	"Godzirra"	"Godzilla" by Eminem ft. Juice Wrld
2022	"Chigger"	"Shivers" by Ed Sheeran
2022	"(Clean Your) Room Room Now"	"Boom Boom Pow" by Black Eyed Peas
2022	"I'm Pikachu Achoo"	"Hot Girl Bummer" by Blackbear
2022	"Will Smith Energy"	"Big Energy" by Latto
2022	"I Love the CCP"	"Enemy" by Imagine Dragons & JID
2022	"10 Things I Hate About Jew"	"10 Things I Hate About You" by Leah Kate
2022	"Ninja"	"Woman" by Doja Cat
2022	"I'm Romanian"	"Maniac" by Michael Sembello
2022	"Oscar the Incel"	"Betty (Get Money)" by Yung Gravy
2022	"Pygmies"	"Kiss Me" by Sixpence None the Richer
2022	"The Story of Jesus"	"Victoria's Secret" by Jax
2022	"Andrew Tate"	"Whatcha Say" by Jason Derulo
2023	"Top G"	"ABCDEFU" by Gayle
2023	"Furries (I Dress Like a Dog)"	"Promiscuous" by Nelly Furtado ft. Timbaland
2023	"Boom! Boom! It's Ramadan"	"Tunak Tunak Tun" by Daler Mehndi
2023	"Palestinians (Know How to Party)"	"California Love" by Tupac Shakur
2023	"Asian's Paradise"	"Gangsta's Paradise" by Coolio
2023	"Joe Biden No! (Nintendoverse)"	"Can't Tame Her" by Zara Larsson
2023	"I Am Obama"	"Mother" by Meghan Trainor
2023	"Women Outside the Kitchen"	"Rich Men North of Richmond" by Oliver Anthony
2023	"Gay Now in Malta"	"All Star" by Smash Mouth
2023	"I'm Serbian"	"Disturbia" by Rihanna
2024	"Master of Dungeons"	"Master of Puppets" by Metallica
2024	"We Are the Houthis!"	"Lil Boo Thang" by Paul Russell
2024	"Skibidi I'm Inside Your Toilet"	"J Christ" by Lil Nas X
2024	"What Colour's Your Bugatti?"	"Shape of You" by Ed Sheeran
2024	"Queen Of The Plants"	—
2024	"I Wanna Blow U (Up)"	"Agora Hills" by Doja Cat
2024	"Adolf's Paradise"	"Gangsta's Paradise" by Coolio
2024	"I'm Not a Czech (I'm Slovak)"	"Obsessed" by Olivia Rodrigo
2024	"2 Pack, 2 Pack"	"Bad Feeling (Oompa Loompa)" by Jagwar Twin
2024	"Germania"	"Amerika" by Rammstein
2024	"I'm Aboriginal"	"Wild Ones" by Jessie Murph & Jelly Roll
2024	"What's Your Age Again?"	"What's My Age Again?" by Blink-182
2024	"Baby Baby Baby Oil"	"Baby" by Justin Bieber ft. Ludacris
2024	"Did Dy Did It"	"Pretty Girls" by Iyaz ft. Travie McCoy
2025	"U Never B Doctor"	"The Monster" by Eminem ft. Rihanna
2025	"We Chinese We #1"	"Espresso" by Sabrina Carpenter
2025	"A La Who Ack Bar!"	"Abracadabra" by Lady Gaga
2025	"Free P Diddy"	"We Built This City" by Starship
2025	"Call Me Khamenei"	"Call Me Maybe" by Carly Rae Jepsen
2026	"impaki impaki"	"APT." by Rosé & Bruno Mars
2026	"MADURO"	"Umbrella" by Rihanna ft. Jay-Z
2026	"Epstein Files"	"We Didn't Start the Fire" by Billy Joel
2026	"Kim"	"Stan" by Eminem
2026	"Epstein Island"	"Higher" by Creed
2026	"George Floyd's Summer of Fun"	"The Boys of Summer" by Don Henley
2026	"Turk Turk Turk Turk Turk Turk"	"Work" by Rihanna
2026	"Stand Up for Your Rice"	"Get Up Stand Up" by Bob Marley
"—" denotes a song that is not a parody.

==== As featured artist ====
Year	Title	Participating artists
2019	"The Feminist Song"	Z-FLO featuring Rucka Rucka Ali
2021	"Pill Popper (Remix)"	Jeremie featuring Rucka Rucka Ali
2022	"Pill Popper (Dubstep Remix)"	Jeremie featuring Rucka Rucka Ali
2024	"Iron Zion Lion"	Jeremie featuring Rucka Rucka Ali

=== Music videos ===
Year	Video	Director
2006	"I Heart Crack"	DeeJay Vinegar
2009	"I Don't Like White People"	Serchlite Music/Pinegrove
2008	"I Can Do Whatever I'm White"	MC Serch
2009	"Good Kids Smoke Crack"	Pinegrove Records
2009	"Anne Frank Bash 2009"	Serchlite Music/Pinegrove
2009	"Pligganease"	Unknown
2011	"Justin's Beaver"	Pinegrove Collective
2015	"Kim Jong Un Song"	Dave Farese
2015	"Shake Ur Tush"	Non-album track
2017	"Am I Gay?"	Foxy
2017	"Ebola 2.0"	Non-album track
