= Waiting to Inhale =

Waiting to Inhale may refer to:

- Waiting to Inhale, a 2008 album by Afroman
- Waiting to Inhale, a 1998 Dosia album by Luni Coleone and others
- Waitin' to Inhale, a 2007 album by Devin the Dude
- Waiting to Inhale: Marijuana, Medicine and the Law, a 2006 film by Jed Riffe
- Waiting to Inhale: the Politics of Medical Marijuana, a 2000 book by Alan Bock
- "Waiting to Inhale", a 2002 episode of My Family (series 3)
- "Waiting to Inhale", a 1997 episode of Murphy Brown

== See also ==
- Waiting to Exhale, a 1995 American romance film
