= Victoria Anthony (singer) =

Canadian singer-songwriter

- Born: August 27, 2005 (age 20); Vancouver, British Columbia, Canada
- Genres: Pop, Pop-punk
- Occupations: Singer, songwriter, director
- Instruments: Vocals, piano, guitar
- Years active: 2019–present
- Website: victoriaanthony.com

Victoria Anthony (born August 27, 2005) is a Canadian singer-songwriter. When she was 12 years old, she sang at a Pink concert, which went viral and received attention from national news outlets. She released her first original song, "Without You", at the age of 13, and her first album, Real Life, at the age of 15. She has been featured twice in The Recording Academy's series Press Play At Home and once in their series It Goes To 11. In March 2023, she was included in People magazine's list of emerging artists.

== Life and career ==
=== Early life and career beginnings ===
Victoria Anthony is from Vancouver, British Columbia, and has three brothers. She started singing when she was two years old. At the age of 12, she taught herself piano and guitar and picked up songwriting. That same year, with encouragement from her mother, she started a Twitter campaign called #VicAndPink to convince American singer-songwriter Pink to sing with her at Rogers Arena on her 2018 Beautiful Trauma World Tour. The campaign was reported by local news outlets, retweeted by Canadian singer-songwriter Sarah McLachlan, and eventually noticed by Pink, who located Anthony in the crowd and allowed her to sing "Perfect" during the concert. The video of Anthony singing went viral, garnering 100 million views within a year, and received attention from multiple national news outlets, including Global News, Today, and People.

=== 2019–2021: Real Life ===
Anthony released her debut single, "Without You", in February 2019. The song gained 70,000 streams on Spotify and 100,000 views on YouTube within its first week. A month later she released her second single, "Because I'm a Girl", co-written with multiplatinum production team The Fourth Floor. The song, which is about female empowerment, received 180,000 streams on Spotify and 350,000 views on YouTube within its first month. Anthony's debut album, Real Life, came out on October 23, 2020, and garnered one million streams within its first three months. A live acoustic of one of the album's songs, "Breathe Underwater", was featured in an episode of The Recording Academy's series Press Play At Home. In 2021, her performance of "Breathe Underwater" was included on a live acoustic EP called LIVE along with covers of "Blank Space" by Taylor Swift and "We Are Young" by Fun. The Recording Academy also featured her cover of "Blank Space" in Press Play At Home.

=== 2021–present: New Disaster ===
In June 2021, Anthony released "Dirty Lipstick", the process of which was explained in an episode of The Recording Academy's series It Goes To 11. Her second single of 2021, "How Cute", was released on her 16th birthday. In late 2021, she did her first-ever US tour opening for Devon Baldwin.

The first single off Anthony's sophomore album, "Kinda Into You", came out on April 15, 2022. On August 5, 2022, she released the second single, "Stupid Girl", which the Alternative Press compared to the sounds of American singer-songwriters Olivia Rodrigo and Maggie Lindemann. Throughout 2022, she opened for Hey Violet's West Coast tour and Leah Kate's European tour, testing songs for her sophomore album. The latter tour coincided with the release of "Should've Known Better", the third single off her sophomore album. In January 2023, she released "Another Regret", the fourth single. Following the release of the fifth single, "Can't Hold Back", in March 2023, Anthony was featured in People magazine's list of emerging artists.

New Disaster, Anthony's sophomore album, came out on May 12, 2023, exactly five years after she sang at Pink's concert. In a review of the album, Out Now Magazine remarked that the album had "a lyrical depth and directness that you wouldn’t expect from a 17-year-old". Billboard included the album's title track in their top 10 songs of the week.

== Artistry ==
Anthony's first album, Real Life, had a contemporary pop sound. The release of "How Cute" in 2021 represented a venture into a more pop-rock sound. Her sophomore album, New Disaster, has largely been described as pop-punk with rock elements and noted for its high energy and angst.

Anthony is involved in every step of the creative process, including conceptualizing and co-directing all her music videos. In an interview with SOCAN, she explained:

It’s really important to me to see a song through the finish line, because I’m the only one who really knows what it’s about, and can get into the nuance of the way it would look if you made it into a picture, and if you made it into a video. And so, in the end, everything that I release, it has my name on it, and I want it to really be mine, and give as much input and vision that I can into it. And what’s even more important to me than that, is that I can really make sure that I get the most out of the story, the most out of the writing, and take it all the way to its full potential.
