= Mike Wise (music producer) =

Canadian music producer and songwriter (born 1985)

- Genres: Pop; hip hop; R&B; EDM
- Occupation: Record producer
- Years active: 2006–present

Mike Wise is a Canadian music producer, songwriter known for working with artists such as Charli XCX, Chappell Roan, Ellie Goulding, Alessia Cara, Britney Spears, Bülow, Leah Kate and The Chainsmokers. He is based in Toronto, Ontario.

== Discography ==
=== Singles ===
Year	Title	Peak chart positions										Certifications
Year	Title	US	US Dance	US Pop	US Rhythmic	US Hip-Hop	AUS	CAN	NZ	SWE	UK	Certifications
2020	"Love I'm Given" Ellie Goulding	—	—	—	—	—	—	—	31	—	—	
2020	"Matches" Britney Spears	7	—	—	—	—	—	11	40	—	—	
2019	"The Truth" James Blunt	—	—	—	—	—	—	—	—	—	—	
2019	"Cold" James Blunt	—	—	—	—	—	—	—	—	—	—	
2016	"Vicious" Chantal Kreviazuk	—	—	—	—	—	—	65	—	—	—	
2022	"This Sucks." Virginia to Vegas & MacKenzie Porter	—	—	—	—	—	—	—	—	—	—	
2022	"10 Things I Hate About You" Leah Kate	— (Note: "10 Things I Hate About You" did not enter the Billboard Hot 100, but peaked at number 2 on the Bubbling Under Hot 100 chart.)	—	—	—	—	22	82	18	—	30	

== Full discography ==
Discography
Year	Title	Artist	Album	Role
2026	Expectations	Olivia Rodrigo	You Seem Pretty Sad for a Girl So in Love	Producer
2026	Crush - Girls Trip	Zara Larsson & Eli	Midnight Sun: Girls Trip	Producer
2026	Disco Darling	Carly Rae Jepsen	Single	Co-writer/Producer
2025	Glitter	Eli	Glitter - Single	Co-writer/Producer
2025	Don't Ask Questions	Alessi Rose	for your validation- EP	Co-writer/Producer
2024	99 Boys	Emeline	Single	Co-writer/Producer
2024	Don't Get Over It, Get Even	Leah Kate	Single	Co-writer/Producer
2024	Me Before You	Kygo & Plested	Single	Co-writer
2024	More Often Than Not	Virginia To Vegas	Single	Co-writer/Producer
2024	In His Room	Stephen Dawes	Single	Co-writer/Producer
2024	Good Girl	Kayla Rae Haywood	Single	Co-writer/Producer
2024	Something Like You	EZI	Into Your Power, Into Your Light	Producer
2024	Animal	Benee	Single	Co-writer/Producer
2024	Field Of Dreams	EZI	Into Your Power, Into Your Light	Producer
2024	Me Before You	Kygo & Plested	Single	Co-writer
2023	I WRITE SONGS ABOUT YOU	Braden Bales	CATALYST-EP	Co-writer/Producer
2023	ME MYSELF AND YOU	Braden Bales	Single	Co-producer
2023	Snowglobe	UPSAHL	Single	Co-writer/Producer
2023	make out with a stranger	EMELINE	Single	Co-producer
2023	NO HANDS (SIDE A)	UPSAHL	UPSAHL PRESENTS: THE PHX TAPES	Producer
2023	Contemporary Love	Rêve	Breaking Up With Jesus	Co-writer/Producer
2023	Sleep Without You	Alyssa Reid	Single	Producer
2023	HOSTAGE	Braden Bales	Single	Co-writer/Producer
2023	Femininonemon	Chappell Roan	The Rise and Fall of a Midwest Princess	Co-producer
2023	Super Graphic Ultra Modern Girl	Chappell Roan	The Rise and Fall of a Midwest Princess	Co-producer
2023	Bad Taste	Leah Kate	Super Over	Co-writer/Producer
2023	Liar	Leah Kate	Super Over	Co-writer/Producer
2023	Lucky	Leah Kate	Super Over	Co-writer/Producer
2023	Brainwash	Leah Kate	Super Over	Co-writer/Producer
2023	911	Leah Kate	Super Over	Co-writer/Producer
2023	Designated Driver	Salem Ilese	High Concept	Co-writer/Co-producer
2023	Waiting for this Love to Die	Billianne	The Things We Talk About	Co-writer/Producer
2023	I'm Good	Natalie Jane & charlieonnafriday	Single	Co-producer
2023	Everything I'm Not	EMELINE	Single	Co-writer/Co-producer
2023	I'm Not Crying	Alex Porat	Single	Co-writer/producer
2023	feelings	EMELINE	Single	Co-writer/producer
2023	Collapsing Stars	Mckenna Grace	Bittersweet 16	Co-writer/producer
2023	Buzzkill Baby	Mckenna Grace	Bittersweet 16	Co-writer/producer
2023	Baby Don't Cry (Feat. Young Thug)	Philmon Lee	Single	Co-writer/Co-producer
2022	My Bed	Leah Kate	Alive and Unwell (deluxe)	Co-writer/producer
2022	What Are We	Olivia O'Brien	A Means To An End	Co-writer/Co-producer
2022	The Night (Part 2)	Morgan Wade	Single	Co-writer/Co-Producer
2022	Alive and Unwell	Leah Kate	Album	Co-writer/Producer
2022	Monster	Leah Kate	Single	Co-writer/Producer
2022	STRUT	EMELINE	Single	Co-writer/Producer
2022	What's With The Roses	NOTD, Kiiara	Single	Co-writer/ Co-producer
2022	Bad Energy	Lilyisthatyou	The Character	Co-writer/Producer
2022	Life Sux	Leah Kate	Single	Co-writer/Producer
2022	When It Hurts	Alyssa Reid	Single	
2022	Twinkle Twinkle Little Bitch	Leah Kate	Single	Co-writer/Producer
2022	you don't know	Virginia To Vegas	Single	
2022	Like A Song	Alyssa Reid	Single	
2022	Hot Crush Lover	Blu DeTiger	Single	
2022	Take A Picture	COIN	Uncanny Valley	
2022	Vitamins	ELIO	Single	
2022	10 Things I Hate About You	Leah Kate	Single	
2022	roses	Alyssa Reid	Single	
2022	Yuck	Charli XCX	Crash	Co-writer/Producer
2022	amnesia	Virginia To Vegas	it's a little complicated, but i'm okay	
2022	no excuses	Virginia To Vegas	it's a little complicated, but i'm okay	
2022	outerspace	Virginia To Vegas	it's a little complicated, but i'm okay	
2022	Dancing Around It	Coleman Hell	Single	
2022	30k	noelle	30k - E.P.	
2022	I Give Everything	Ryland James	Single	
2021	PS I Love You	Lost Kings	It's Not You, It's Me	
2021	amnesia	Virginia To Vegas	Single	
2021	Ocean	Alyssa Reid	ASHS	
2021	Love Myself	Andy Grammer	Single	
2021	Bones	Camylio	all the songs i used to love	
2021	F U Anthem	Leah Kate	What Just Happened?	
2021	Stutter	Conor Gains	Single	
2021	You Let Me Down	Alessia Cara	In The Meantime	
2021	Drama Queen	Alessia Cara	In The Meantime	
2021	Middle Ground (feat. CHIKA)	Alessia Cara	In The Meantime	
2021	Find My Boy	Alessia Cara	In The Meantime	
2021	Fishbowl	Alessia Cara	In The Meantime	
2021	Stranger	Ivy Adara	Single	
2021	This Sucks	Virginia To Vegas, Mackenzie Porter	Single	
2021	Revolver	bülow	Single	
2021	Malibu	Virginia To Vegas, NOTD	Malibu - Single	
2021	GLAM!	Allie X	GLAM! - Single	
2021	Love I'm Given	Ellie Goulding	Brightest Blue	
2021	Matches	Britney Spears, Backstreet Boys	Glory (Deluxe)	
2021	Cold	James Blunt	Once Upon A Mind (Time Suspended Edition)	
2021	California (from Songland) (feat. Tyga)	Usher, Tyga	California (from Songland) (feat. Tyga) - Single	
2021	Love Struck (From Songland)	Boyz II Men	Love Struck (From Songland) - Single	
2021	NOW	Olivia O'Brien	NOW - Single	
2021	By My Side (with SONIA)	Black Atlass, SONIA	Dream Awake	
2021	told you so	Virginia To Vegas	don't wake me, i'm dreaming - Single	
2021	cry	Virginia To Vegas	don't wake me, i'm dreaming - Single	
2021	sunny days	Virginia To Vegas	don't wake me, i'm dreaming - Single	
2021	Palm Springs (the way you made me feel)	Virginia To Vegas	Palm Springs (the way you made me feel) - Single	
2021	what are we	Virginia To Vegas	a constant state of improvement.	
2021	betterman	Virginia To Vegas	a constant state of improvement.	
2021	one on one	Virginia To Vegas	a constant state of improvement.	
2021	better with you	Virginia To Vegas	a constant state of improvement.	
2021	See You	Johnny Orlando	It's Never Really Over (Expanded)	
2021	Take Me Home	Shawn Hook	Take Me Home	
2021	I Don't Wanna Dance	Shawn Hook	Take Me Home	
2021	Good Love	Shawn Hook	Take Me Home	
2021	Deeper	Shawn Hook	Take Me Home	
2021	Pressure	Ivy Adara	Pressure - Single	
2021	War	Tedy	Boys Don't Cry	
2021	Stuck	Tedy	Boys Don't Cry	
2021	Fireworks	Tedy	Boys Don't Cry	
2021	Hopeless	Tedy	Boys Don't Cry	
2021	Shades of Blue	noelle	Shades of Blue - Single	
2021	Sad World	noelle	Sad World - Single	
2021	Don't Call Me	ASHS	Don't Call Me - Single	
2021	Thank Her For That	Owen Barney	Thank Her For That - Single	
2020				
2020	Pour Me	Owen Barney	Pour Me - Single	
2020	Sixteen	Ellie Goulding	Sixteen - Single	
2020	Do You Mean	The Chainsmokers, Ty Dolla $ign, bülow	World War Joy	
2020	You & Jennifer (the other side) (with Rich The Kid)	bülow, Rich The Kid	You & Jennifer (the other side) (with Rich The Kid) - Single	
2020	Sweet Little Lies	bülow	Sweet Little Lies - Single	
2020	Own Me	bülow	The Contender	
2020	Boys Will Be Boys	bülow	The Contender	
2020	Sundress	bülow	The Contender	
2020	Get Stüpid	bülow	Crystalline	
2020	Euphoria	bülow	Crystalline	
2020	The Truth	James Blunt	Once Upon A Mind	
2020	Just Friends	Virginia To Vegas	Just Friends - Single	
2020	Internet	Virginia To Vegas	Hartland St.	
2020	Yesterday	Virginia To Vegas	Hartland St.	
2020	Losing Touch	Virginia To Vegas	Hartland St.	
2020	Last Summer	Johnny Orlando	Teenage Fever	
2020	Piece Of My Heart	Johnny Orlando	Teenage Fever	
2020	Cold	ASHS	3AM Pt. 2 - Single	
2020	A Million Voices	ASHS	3AM Pt. 2 - Single	
2020	Lie	ASHS	3AM Pt. 2 - Single	
2020	Paranoid	ASHS	Paranoid - Single	
2020	no love lost	laye	lonesome	
2020	dancing	laye	lonesome	
2020	lonely anthem	laye	lonesome	
2020	High School Droupout	Neon Dreams	Sweet Dreams till Sunbeams	
2020	Somebody Like You	Owen Barney, Alyssa Reid	Somebody Like You - Single	
2020	How You Love Me	Dan Bremnes	Wherever I Go	
2020	Speak To Me	Dan Bremnes	Wherever I Go	
2020	It Would Have Been Enough	Dan Bremnes	Wherever I Go	
2020	Let That Go	Dan Bremnes	Wherever I Go	
2020	Scars	Dan Bremnes	Wherever I Go	
2020	Searching for Something	Dan Bremnes	Wherever I Go	
2020	Rearview	JAHKOY	404	
2019
2019	Still in Love	Cassie Dasilva	Still in Love - Single	
2019	IDWK	DVBBS, blackbear	IDWK - Single	
2019	The Last Of The Real Ones (Remix) [feat. MadeinTYO & bülow]	Fall Out Boy, MadeinTYO, bülow	The Last Of The Real Ones (Remix) [feat. MadeinTYO & bülow] - Single	
2019	Two Punks In Love	bülow	Two Punks In Love - Single	
2019	SAD AND BORED	bülow, Duckwrth	Damaged Vol. 2	
2019	Honor Roll	bülow	Damaged Vol. 2	
2019	You & Jennifer	bülow	Damaged Vol. 2	
2019	Yesterday	Virginia To Vegas	Yesterday - Single	
2019	The Other Team	UPSAHL	The Other Team - Single	
2019	Listen Closely	DVBBS, SAFE	Listen Closely - Single	
2019	Without You	ASHS	Without You - Single	
2019	Gimme	Ralph	A Good Girl	
2019	Tables Have Turned	Ralph	A Good Girl	
2019	Girl Next Door	Ralph	A Good Girl	
2019	Bedroom Eyes	Ralph	A Good Girl	
2019	September Fades	Ralph	A Good Girl	
2019	Dark Clouds	Ralph	A Good Girl	
2019	Tables Have Turned	Ralph	Tables Have Turned - Single	
2019	For My Eyes Only	NEW CITY	For My Eyes Only - Single	
2019	I Can Do You Better	NEW CITY	For My Eyes Only - Single	
2019	Crystal Universe	K.I.D	Tired All The Time	
2019	I Miss My Friends	K.I.D	Tired All The Time	
2019	Live Through The Night	Dear Rogue	PHASES (Deluxe)	
2019	Stolen Days	Dear Rogue	PHASES (Deluxe)	
2019	Little By Little	Dear Rogue	PHASES (Deluxe)	
2019	The Clearing	Dear Rogue	PHASES (Deluxe)	
2019	Wherever I Go	Dan Bremnes	Wherever I Go	
2019	Up Again	Dan Bremnes	Wherever I Go	
2019	Going Together	Dan Bremnes	Wherever I Go	
2019	The Way	Dan Bremnes	Wherever I Go	
2019	What a Mess	Myles Castello	What a Mess / Right by You - Single	
2019	Friends	Kieran Mercer	Fools Gold - EP	
2019	Skip The Line	Kieran Mercer	Fools Gold - EP	
2019	Outrun The Pain	Kieran Mercer	Fools Gold - EP	
2019	Rough Cut	Cassie Dasilva	Rough Cut - Single	
2018
2018	Welcome to My Castle	Cassie Dasilva	Welcome To My Castle - Single	
2018	Not A Love Song	bülow	Damaged Vol. 1	
2018	Lines	bülow	Damaged Vol. 1	
2018	Paper Love	Allie X	CollXtion II	
2018	Casanova	Allie X	CollXtion II	
2018	Lifted	Allie X	CollXtion II	
2018	Old Habits Die Hard	Allie X	CollXtion II	
2018	Casanova	Allie X, VÉRITÉ	Casanova - Single	
2018	Emotions	Virginia To Vegas	Emotions - Single	
2018	Selfish	Virginia To Vegas	Selfish - Single	
2018	Machu Picchu	Neon Dreams	Machu Picchu - Single	
2018	Cold To The Touch	Ralph	Ralph	
2018	Tease	Ralph	Ralph	
2018	Something More	Ralph	Ralph	
2018	Taker	K.I.D	Poster Child	
2018	Fire Escape	Serena Ryder	Utopia (Deluxe)	
2018	Electric Love	Serena Ryder	Utopia (Deluxe)	
2018	Firewater	Serena Ryder	Utopia (Deluxe)	
2018	Ice Age	Serena Ryder	Utopia (Deluxe)	
2018	Sanctuary	Serena Ryder	Utopia (Deluxe)	
2018	Hands	Serena Ryder	Utopia (Deluxe)	
2018	Wolves	Serena Ryder	Utopia (Deluxe)	
2018	Utopia	Serena Ryder	Utopia (Deluxe)	
2018	The Flame	Serena Ryder	Utopia (Deluxe)	
2018	21 Days	Scott Helman	Hôtel de Ville	
2018	You Made Her	Scott Helman	Hôtel de Ville	
2018	I Wrote A Song For You	Isac Elliot	FAITH	
2017
2017	High	Alyssa Reid	High - Single	
2017	Misbelieving	Allie X	Misbelieving - Single	
2017	Casanova	Allie X	Casanova - Single	
2017	All the Rage	Allie X	All the Rage - Single	
2017	Who's With Me	USS (Ubiquitous Synergy Seeker)	New World Alphabet	
2017	California Medication	USS (Ubiquitous Synergy Seeker)	New World Alphabet	
2017	Fire In My Soul	Walk Off the Earth	Fire In My Soul - Single	
2017	Wish You Were Here	Cider Sky	Wish You Were Here - Single	
2017	Badlands	Alyssa Reid, Likewise	Badlands - Single	
2017	Rollercoaster	Alyssa Reid	Rollercoaster - Single	
2016
2016	Nights (feat. W. Darling)	Snow Tha Product (feat. W. Darling)	Nights (feat. W. Darling) - Single	
2016	HELLO	Allie X	COLLXTION I (Deluxe)	
2016	CATCH	Allie X	COLLXTION I (Deluxe)	
2016	PRIME	Allie X	COLLXTION I (Deluxe)	
2016	NEVER ENOUGH	Allie X, Michael Wise	COLLXTION I (Deluxe)	
2016	In Over My Head	Shawn Hook	Analog Love	
2016	Who Do You Love	Shawn Hook	Analog Love	
2016	Analog Love	Shawn Hook	Analog Love	
2016	Million Ways	Shawn Hook	Analog Love	
2016	Bad Girls	Shawn Hook	Analog Love	
2016	Dangerous	Alyssa Reid, The Heist	Phoenix	
2016	I'll Keep Waving	W. Darling	Lost Girls: Chapter Two	
2016	Dizzy	W. Darling	Lost Girls: Chapter Two	
2016	Skeletons	W. Darling	Lost Girls: Chapter Two	
2016	Learn to Love	W. Darling	Chapter One	
2016	Hunting Happiness	W. Darling	Chapter One	
2016	Nights Like This	W. Darling	Chapter One	
2015
2015	Summertime	Trevor Guthrie	Summertime - Single	
2015	Make It Last	Virginia To Vegas	Volume I	
2015	Colourful	Virginia To Vegas	Volume I	
2015	Don't Fight The Music	Virginia To Vegas	Volume I	
2015	Beautiful	Virginia To Vegas	Volume I	
2015	That Sweater	Scott Helman	Augusta	
2015	Cry Cry Cry	Scott Helman	Augusta	
2015	The Lion	Scott Helman	Augusta	
2015	Yin Yang	USS (Ubiquitous Synergy Seeker)	Advanced Basics	
2015	Baby It's Cold Outside	Virginia To Vegas, Alyssa Reid	Baby It's Cold Outside - Single	
2014	"Soundwave"	Trevor Guthrie	"Soundwave - Single"	
