= Idaho (disambiguation) =

Idaho is a state in the Pacific Northwest of the United States.

Idaho may also refer to:

== Places ==
- Idaho, Ohio, an unincorporated community
- Idaho County, Idaho, a county in the state of Idaho
- Idaho City, Idaho, a city in Boise County
- University of Idaho, in Moscow, Idaho

== Music ==
- Idaho (band), a California-based slowcore band
- "Idaho" (Jesse Stone song), a jazz song written by Jesse Stone
- "Idaho" (Feeder song), a song by British band Feeder
- "Private Idaho", a song by The B-52's from the 1980 album Wild Planet
- "Idaho," a song by Nerina Pallot from the 2005 album Fires
- "Idaho," a song by Josh Ritter from the 2006 album The Animal Years
- "Idaho," a song by Afroman from the 2008 album Waiting to Inhale
- "Idaho," a song by Train from the 1998 self-titled album Train
- "Idaho," a song by The 4 Seasons from the 1969 album The Genuine Imitation Life Gazette
- "Idaho," a song by Gorillaz from the 2018 album The Now Now
- "Idaho," a song by The Hoosiers from the 2023 album Confidence
- "Idaho", a song by John Linnell from the album State Songs, 1999

== Other ==
- Duncan Idaho, a fictional character from the Dune universe
- Idaho (serial), a 1925 film serial
- Idaho (1943 film), an American film directed by Joseph Kane
- Idaho (sidewheeler), a steamboat that ran on the Columbia River and Puget Sound
- Idaho, an automobile in the Grand Theft Auto series
- Idaho, a character in The Amazing World of Gumball
- IDAHO (May 17), an abbreviation for International Day Against Homophobia, Transphobia and Biphobia
- USS Idaho, several US Navy ships have been named after the state
- Idaho (horse), a thoroughbred racehorse
- Idaho (novel), a 2019 novel by Emily Ruskovich
