= Disco Darling =

Promotional single by Carly Rae Jepsen
- Released: April 18, 2026
- Recorded: 2017–18
- Genre: Pop; disco
- Length: 3:39
- Label: 604; Schoolboy; Interscope
- Songwriters: Carly Rae Jepsen; Tavish Crowe; Mike Wise
- Producer: Mike Wise

"Disco Darling" is a song by Canadian singer-songwriter Carly Rae Jepsen. It was released on April 18, 2026, through 604, Schoolboy and Interscope Records, as a Record Store Day-exclusive vinyl record.

== Background and release ==
The song is an outtake from the 2019 album Dedicated, as well as Dedicated Side B, its companion album. It was first written in 2016 alongside her guitarist Tavish Crowe, and was later reworked with music producer Mike Wise. In February 2018, Jepsen teased lyrics of the song through her Instagram profile, leading fans to believe that a song titled "Disco Darling" would soon be released as a single, though this release never materialized. Part of the song would eventually be reworked into "Window", a track released as part of Dedicated Side B. A portion of the song would leak online in December 2020, followed by the full song leaking in February 2021 where it eventually became a fan-favourite track and led to a years-long fan-led campaign for its official release.

The song gained mainstream attention in December 2025 when Heated Rivalry creator Jacob Tierney stated his intention to get Jepsen to record an original song for the show's second season on the What Chaos! podcast. The show's host, Pete Blackburn, responded to this saying that he should "just get her to release 'Disco Darling'." In February 2026, Jepsen teased the song's lyrics in a cryptic newsletter post. This was soon followed by an official announcement that "Disco Darling" would be getting a release as a baby-blue 7-inch vinyl record for Record Store Day on April 18, 2026, limited to 2000 copies.

== Critical reception ==
Canadian music journalist Eric Alper described the song as "a shimmering, disco-inflected pop song built around the kind of chorus that lodges itself immediately and refuses to leave."

== Charts ==
Chart performance for "Disco Darling"
Chart (2026)	Peak position
UK Singles Sales (OCC)	30
