= Comedy hip-hop =

Hip-hop subgenre

- Stylistic origins: Alternative hip-hop; satire; comedy
- Cultural origins: Early-1990s to mid-2000s, U.S.: (Hip-hop; gangsta rap; crunk; cloud rap; trap)
- Typical instruments: Rapping; drum machine; turntables; sampler; keyboard; laptop; Digital audio workstation; synthesizer

Other topics
- Fear of a Black Hat

Comedy hip-hop or comedy rap is a subgenre of hip-hop music designed to be amusing or comedic, compared to artists who incorporate humor into their more serious, purist hip-hop styles. Many examples of comedy hip-hop are parodic.

Satirical hip-hop is a variant of comedy hip-hop done in a sarcastic, parodic, or deadpan way.

Meme rap (or ironic rap) is a form of comedy rap, which grew out of the SoundCloud rap movement and achieved some mainstream success during the 2010s and 2020s. Notable examples include artist Yuno Miles.

== Characteristics ==
Satirical hip-hop may be a parody of the whole genre of hip-hop and/or a form of critical music that uses hip-hop as a vehicle for satirical messages. Musical influence and scope vary, ranging from gangsta rap, mumble rap, trap to alternative hip-hop. The more humorous satirical sub-genre meme rap was created with the intent of becoming viral. In the context of mumble rap, a satirical hip-hop song might involve lo-fi production, use of personas/pseudonyms (e.g. George "Joji" Miller), simplistic music videos, lazy rhymes, and intentionally stereotypical lyrics/topics.

== Origin ==
Satire and hip-hop have been intertwined since the Black Arts Movement period; hip-hop satire bridges popular culture forms like rap and experimental fictional forms while "exploring the complexities of Black American identity." Hip-hop culture has also been criticized in other media, such as Fear of a Black Hat (1993), a mockumentary focusing on hip-hop posturing; the Boondocks episode "The Story of Gangstalicious" (2005); and Spike Lee's Bamboozled (2000).

Before the darker themes that are characteristic of the gangsta rap of the 1990s, comedy hip-hop, with its lighter and more humorous style, came to prominence in the 1980s, carried by popular acts such as the Beastie Boys.

In the post-2000s digital era, satirical rap, especially African-American satirical rap, retains a marginal status, because commenting on black cultural representations or moving away from performing black stereotypes that paradoxically cemented hip-hop's global status risks the possibility of an artist's commercial failure. Some who escaped this fate include the early-1990s alternative hip-hop trio and progenitor of modern satirical rap De La Soul (e.g. their 1989 landmark album 3 Feet High and Rising, their record industry-critical 1991 album De La Soul Is Dead, and their 2012 song "Must B the Music") and Childish Gambino in the 2010s.

== History and examples ==
=== 1980s ===
Run-DMC's "Christmas in Hollis" from 1987 is comedy rap, as is DJ Jazzy Jeff & The Fresh Prince's 1988 song "Parents Just Don't Understand". N.W.A and Ice Cube's early albums were not as comedic and lighthearted as the Fresh Prince's but did incorporate humor.

Various influential comedy hip-hop groups began in the late 1980s, such as DJ Jazzy Jeff & The Fresh Prince, De La Soul, Kid 'n Play, Das EFX, and Fu-Schnickens.

=== 1990s ===
"Weird Al" Yankovic has made parody tracks of popular hip-hop songs since the 1990s including "Amish Paradise" and "White and Nerdy". Another early example is with Southern California-based rapper Afroman, with his two well-known tracks "Crazy Rap" and "Because I Got High," both released in 2001, which featured comedic lyrics.

Throughout the late 1990s and 2000s, rappers that used comedy in their lyrics, including Insane Clown Posse, Eminem, Ludacris and Afroman gained popularity. In Sweden, Swedish-Finnish comedy rapper Markoolio became a platinum seller between 1998 and 2007.

=== 2000s ===
The Lonely Island is an American comedy trio who released their first comedic rap song, Ka-Blamo!, in 2001. They rose to fame after joining Saturday Night Live (SNL) in 2005, where they made many satirical songs that they described as "fake rap". One of their first videos to air, "Lazy Sunday," became an internet sensation and garnered over five million views before NBC took it down. The Lonely Island's brand is to make songs that sound macho but actually parody masculinity. They have collaborated with numerous mainstream artists, including Justin Timberlake, Nicki Minaj, Rihanna, and more. Their YouTube channel has exceeded 1 billion views; they are Grammy-nominated; their albums have charted on the Billboard Hot 100; and they won an Emmy award for their song "Dick in a Box." Some of their most popular songs are "I'm on a Boat," "I Just Had Sex," and "Jizz in My Pants." Since leaving SNL, they have continued to make satirical albums and are currently still active.

In 2008, Odd Future members Tyler, the Creator and Jasper Dolphin released their sole EP under the short-lived comedy group name "I Smell Panties." The duo used elements of gangsta rap and Southern hip-hop in a comedic way when performing as I Smell Panties. Tyler then released a track in 2011 called "Come Through Looking Clean," a joke song performed under a character named "Young Nigga." The song parodies the "Bling Era" of mainstream hip-hop that was popular during the 2000s and draws heavy inspiration from the music of Lil B. The Young Nigga character would later be re-used on various skits in the 2012 Adult Swim program Loiter Squad, which was created by and starred members of Odd Future. In February 2016, Tyler revealed that his 2011 breakout viral single "Yonkers" was made as a joke song attempting to parody the style of New York rappers (hence the title. named after the city of the same name).

Michigan-based Internet celebrity and rapper Rucka Rucka Ali became famous in the late 2000s and early 2010s for creating pop song parodies (including parodies of popular hip-hop songs) containing lyrics for shock value. He often includes politically incorrect and juvenile references to ethnic stereotypes, topical subject matter, and dark humor. His music also tends to make use of comedic portrayals of celebrities and his several alter egos espouses stereotypical qualities of specific ethnic groups. Some critics have labeled Ali as a racist as a reaction to his songs, although his humor is heavily influenced by mainstream comedy television shows such as South Park, Family Guy, and Chappelle's Show, and has jokingly defended his brand of humor by claiming that he's affirming the stereotypes he's constantly referencing in his songs as factual. His videos and YouTube channels are frequently removed (since he started creating music videos, he has had 17 YouTube channels deleted for terms of service violations), but are reuploaded by his fans.

=== 2010s ===
"Thrift Shop" by Macklemore & Ryan Lewis broke into charts internationally in 2012.

In the mid-2010s, Ryan Harryman, a San Jose State University student and member of the school's water polo club team, became a viral sensation on the Internet under the stage name "3PAC." He was known for his self-produced music videos, bombastic and aggressive comedic rap songs, and diss tracks targeting mainstream rappers like Eminem and 2 Chainz, as well as YouTube gaming channel PewDiePie. 3PAC made a guest appearance on The New CALassic, a comedy hip-hop mixtape performed by Internet music critic Anthony Fantano (under his "Cal Chuchesta" alter ego) that was released in August 2015. Harryman died at the age of 24 in October 2015 after suffering severe brain damage during a water polo practice.

In 2015, American rapper Hopsin released a song called "No Words", a satirical song making fun of "mumble rappers". In the song, Hopsin only speaks in unintelligible gibberish while using expensive cars, guns, drugs, and women in bikinis in the music video to imitate modern rappers.

In 2017, YouTube personality Filthy Frank released a music project titled Pink Season, the second album performed under the name "Pink Guy". Some songs on the album poke fun at hip-hop music as a whole, among other things. The track "Hand On My Gat" for example, features a character named PolitikZ that acts as a caricature for hardcore underground rappers; that character's previous appearance was on the Filthy Frank video "BAD INTERNET RAPPERS" (uploaded in November 2014), where he performed a song called "Real Hip Hop" that directly parodied the stereotypical anti-mainstream and politically charged attitudes of underground rappers. The Pink Season album reached number one on the iTunes charts and peaked at 70 on the Billboard 200.

In April 2018, Internet personality and music critic Anthony Fantano began releasing more satirical hip-hop tracks under his Cal Chuchesta alter ego, releasing the tracks "Coin Star" and "Don't Talk To Me."

In the late 2010s, new artists in the genre such as Lil Dicky and Ugly God were also gaining popularity, helping the genre to maintain a substantial loyal following. There has also been an uprising in meme rappers such as Yung Gravy and Zack Fox.

=== 2020s ===
Yuno Miles is a comedic rapper who gained prominence in 2021 for his "bizarre" lyrics and off-beat rhythms.

== International examples ==
Outside the English-speaking world, the genre spread in the 1990s, with bands and artists such as German group Fettes Brot, the Swedish-Finnish artist Markoolio and the French group Svinkels.

German hip-hop, in particular, is known for its use of humorous, satirical and ironic lyrics which can mock the heaviness and seriousness of US gangster rap. This tradition can be traced back to Austrian artist Falco. Falco is considered a pioneer of German language rap and hip-hop; he is also known for satire and humor. Other examples include Die Fantastischen Vier, Beginner, Fünf Sterne deluxe, Money Boy and Seeed.
