= Afroholic... The Even Better Times =

Studio album by Afroman
- Released: April 20, 2004
- Genre: Hip-hop
- Length: 148:50 (original); 144:12 (reissue)
- Labels: Hungry Hustler; Redeye
- Producers: Afroman; Darrell "Groovemaster" Havard; Corey Harris; Kendaryl Foreman; Richard "Big Luc" Lucas; Jackie Avery; Rodney "Po Boy" Ashford; David Hobbs; Jim Thompson

Afroman chronology
The Good Times (2001)	Afroholic... The Even Better Times (2004)	Jobe Bells (2004)

Professional ratings
Review scores
Source	Rating
AllMusic	3/5 stars
The Guardian	3/5 stars
Rolling Stone	2/5 stars

Afroholic... The Even Better Times is a double-disc hip-hop album released by Afroman. Despite Afroman's six-album deal with Universal Records, Afroman recorded one album for Universal, The Good Times, and would release all future albums independently, beginning with this one. There are two versions of this album. The original version featured numerous parody songs. The reissue contained, among others, the song "Whack Rappers", which is a diss to many hip-hop and R&B artists, including 50 Cent, Jay-Z, Kelis, Nas and P. Diddy. The album peaked at number 99 on the US Top R&B/Hip-Hop Albums chart and number 36 on the Independent Albums chart.

== Promotion ==
Afroman began promoting this album on his website afromanmusic.com in late March 2004 with the main page saying "Welcome to Afroholics Anonymous, the official support group for Afroholics. Group Therapy is now in Session", as well as an image of the album cover. Around early April 2004, he began promoting that the album would be releasing on the 20th of that month.

== Track listing ==
=== Original ===
==== Disc 1 ====
1. "Nobody Knows My Name"
2. "Leaving California"
3. "Turn It Off"
4. "Suck a Dick Jockey"
5. "Girlz"
6. "I've Been Hustlin'"
7. "West Y'all"
8. "Drive Better Drunk"
9. "Jackin' Afroman"
10. "Colt 45" (Note: "Colt 45" is also the alternate title for "Crazy Rap". They are different songs.)
11. "Freak On with You"
12. "Ghetto Memories"
13. "Cali Swangin'"
14. "What If" (featuring E-40)
15. "From Tha Ghetto"
16. "Sag Your Pants"
17. "Wonderful Tonite"

==== Disc 2 ====
1. "Keep On Limp'n"
2. "On My Hustle" (featuring DJ Mr. Mixx and Big Luc)
3. "Caddy Hop"
4. "Just My Paranoia"
5. "Let's All Get High Tonight"
6. "Late at Night"
7. "Rollin'"
8. "Hittin' Switches"
9. "Airport"
10. "West Coast Rap"
11. "Compton Isn't Too Far Away"
12. "Money (Ain't Everything)"
13. "Money (Reprise)"
14. "U Can Make It"
15. "Major Beat"
16. "Me and Kenny"

=== Reissue ===
==== Disc 1 ====
1. "Roll Your Windows Down"
2. "I've Been Hustlin'"
3. "West Y'all"
4. "I Drive Better Drunk"
5. "Let's Get High Tonight"
6. "Late at Night"
7. "Gangsta Sound"
8. "Leaving California"
9. "Hittin' Switches"
10. "Airport"
11. "Ghetto Memories"
12. "Cali Swangin'"
13. "Paranoid" (Featuring the 2 Zigg Zaggs)

==== Disc 2 ====
1. "Keep On Limp'n"
2. "On My Hustle" (featuring DJ Mr. Mixx and Big Luc)
3. "1988"
4. "This the Kind of Beat"
5. "Dance wit Me" (produced by Lowkey)
6. "What If" (Featuring E-40)
7. "From tha Ghetto"
8. "Smoke 1"
9. "Fuck tha Corporate World"
10. "Money (Ain't Everything)"
11. "U Can Make It"
12. "Major Beat"
13. "Whack Rappers"
14. "Whack Rappers II" (featuring Strange)
15. "Me & Kenny"

== Personnel ==
Credits adapted from Tidal, which reflect the reissued release.

- Afroman – vocals, guitar, engineering, producer, remixing
- Darrell "Groovemaster" Havard – Chapman stick, editing, keyboards, producer
- Mr. Mixxx – turntables
- Jody Stallone – drums
- Corey Harris – producer
- Kendaryl Foreman – producer
- Richard "Big Luc" Lucas – producer
- Jackie Avery – producer
- Rodney "Po Boy" Ashford – producer
- Gerritt Brusse – mastering
- David Hobbs – DJ, producer
- Jim Thompson – editing, producer
- Mark Black – engineering
- Mike D – engineering
- Michael Haddox – design
- E-40 – guest vocals
- Big Luc – guest vocals

== Charts ==
Chart performance for Afroholic... The Even Better Times
Chart (2004)	Peak position
US Independent Albums (Billboard)	36
US Top R&B/Hip-Hop Albums (Billboard)	99
