= In the Meantime (Alessia Cara album) =

Studio album by Alessia Cara
- Released: September 24, 2021
- Recorded: 2019–2021
- Length: 54:27
- Label: Def Jam
- Producers: Banx & Ranx; Billboard; Boi1da; Cameron Bright; Doc McKinney; Don Mills; Dylan Wiggins; Greg Kurstin; Halatrax; Jake Torrey; Joel Little; Jon Levine; Mike Wise; Salaam Remi; YogiTheProducer

Alessia Cara chronology
This Summer (2019)	In the Meantime (2021)	Love & Hyperbole (2025)

Singles from In the Meantime
- 1. "Sweet Dream" Released: July 15, 2021

In the Meantime is the third studio album by Canadian singer and songwriter Alessia Cara, released on September 24, 2021, by Def Jam Recordings. Cara collaborated with Jon Levine, Salaam Remi and Joel Little among several other producers on the project. Deemed as a concept album based "In the meantime between life and death", the album unravels the anxieties of introspection, healing, love and self-reflection.

Three songs were released to promote the album: "Sweet Dream", "Shapeshifter", and "Best Days", with "Sweet Dream" charting at number 51 on the Billboard Canadian Hot 100 chart while the latter two acted as promotional singles. In the Meantime follows Cara's EP This Summer (2019) and Holiday Stuff (2020).

== Release and promotion ==
In the Meantime was released on September 24, 2021, via CD, download and streaming services. Preorders for the album began on September 3, 2021. A vinyl LP was released on April 8, 2022. A signed CD was also made available on Cara's webstore prior to the album's release. In September 2026, to commemorate the album's anniversary, Cara released several voice notes from the initial conception of the album, and shared a previously unreleased song from the album's recording sessions. The song, "Far Away (Freestyle)", was produced by Boi-1da and was made available exclusively through Covver, before being released on YouTube and SoundCloud.

=== Singles ===
"Sweet Dream" was released as one of two songs for the album on July 15, 2021, along with "Shapeshifter". The former of the two reached number 51 in Canada. The music video for "Sweet Dream", directed by Tusk Creative, was uploaded to Cara's YouTube channel simultaneously with the single's release. To promote the single, a lullaby EP was released on August 20, 2021. Cara performed the single on Live with Kelly and Ryan and The Late Show with Stephen Colbert, from Niagara Falls, and also performed "Shapeshifter" on the latter. "Shapeshifter" acted as the album's first promotional single and received a music video, released on July 23, 2021. The video debuted on CBS This Morning and was preceded by an interview with Cara.

"Best Days" was released as the second promotional single, alongside the album, on September 24, 2021. Its music video was released on the same day. A remix EP, which included a new version performed with American a capella group Pentatonix, was released on January 21, 2022. Cara performed the song on The Tonight Show Starring Jimmy Fallon, The Ellen Show, and Good Morning America.

The third promotional single, "You Let Me Down", was supported by a remix EP on September 23, 2022. Prior to being released as a promotional single, Cara released a music video for the song, directed by her brother Dario Caracciolo, in May 2022. During her performance at Lollapalooza, she sang the song alongside Brazilian singer Jão.

=== Marketing ===
The album's tracklist was revealed through Cara's social media on September 13, 2021. A website dedicated to the album, and its lead single "Sweet Dream", was also launched. To promote and discuss In the Meantime, Cara appeared on The Tonight Show Starring Jimmy Fallon, The Ellen Show, among other programmes.

== Critical reception ==
Professional ratings
Aggregate scores
Source	Rating
AnyDecentMusic?	7.4/10
Metacritic	80/100
Review scores
Source	Rating
AllMusic	4/5 stars
NME	4/5 stars
Pitchfork	7.1/10
PopMatters	9/10
Rolling Stone	3.5/5 stars

In the Meantime received positive reviews from music critics upon its release. On the review aggregator site Metacritic, the album holds an average score of 80 out of 100, based on five reviews, indicating "generally favorable reviews". It is Cara's highest rated album on the site.

Writing for AllMusic, Andy Kellman noted that the album's tracks all have a "common" sound while opining that "from start to finish, lolling hooks flood Cara's mind as much as indecision, skepticism, and other negative thoughts ... enabling the listener to have a proper sulk that soothes." Nick Levine of NME wrote that the album proves "there's still plenty of creative gas in the tank" and opined that "I Miss You Don't Call Me" could be "the best song she has ever written," ending his review by stating "her best days definitely lie ahead." Dani Blum of Pitchfork appreciated Cara's voice and the album's themes, but felt that "she dilutes them when she relies too much on metaphor and conceit." Writing for PopMatters, Jeffrey Davies called the album "sonically and lyrically her best work yet," noting that no song "ever feels like filler" while pointing out "Best Days" as one of the standout tracks. Sarah Grant of Rolling Stone named the album a "mighty pop opera" that "walks us through the five stages of grief."

== Track listing ==
In the Meantime track listing
No.	Title	Writer(s)	Producer(s)	Length
1.	"Unboxing Intro"	Alessia Caracciolo; Jon Levine	Levine	0:41
2.	"Box in the Ocean"	Caracciolo; Levine	Levine	3:16
3.	"Bluebird"	Caracciolo; Albert A. Beach; Cameron Breithaupt; Charles Trenet	Cameron Bright	3:14
4.	"Lie to Me"	Caracciolo; Johann Deterville; Clément Langlois-Légaré; Zacharie Raymond; Yannick Rastogi; Milos Angelov; Matthew Samuels	Don Mills; Banx & Ranx; Boi-1da; YogiTheProducer	2:31
5.	"Shapeshifter"	Caracciolo; Salaam Remi	Remi	3:06
6.	"Fishbowl"	Caracciolo; Michael Joseph Wise	Wise	3:08
7.	"I Miss You, Don't Call Me"	Caracciolo; Levine	Levine	3:20
8.	"Middle Ground" (featuring Chika)	Caracciolo; Wise; Jane Chika Oranika	Wise	3:43
9.	"Somebody Else"	Caracciolo; Martin McKinney; Dylan Wiggins	Doc McKinney; Wiggins	3:34
10.	"Drama Queen"	Caracciolo; Alyssa Reid; Wise; Nathan Ferraro; Jamie Appleby; Soran Dussaigne	Wise	3:01
11.	"Clockwork"	Caracciolo; Greg Kurstin	Kurstin	2:27
12.	"Best Days"	Caracciolo; Levine	Levine	3:31
13.	"Sweet Dream"	Caracciolo; Jason Evigan; Levine; Caroline Ailin; Spencer Stewart	Levine; Evigan^{[c]}^{[v]}; Stewart^{[c]}	3:02
14.	"Find My Boy"	Caracciolo; Wise	Wise	3:12
15.	"Voice in My Head"	Caracciolo; Mathieu Jomphe Lépine	Billboard	2:57
16.	"Slow Lie"	Caracciolo; Jeff Halavacs; Jake Torrey	Halatrax; Torrey	2:42
17.	"You Let Me Down"	Caracciolo; Wise	Wise; Hrag Sanbalian^{[c]}	3:13
18.	"Apartment Song"	Caracciolo; Joel Little; Kyle Harvey	Little	3:41
Total length:				54:27

Note

- ^{^[c]} indicates a co-producer
- ^{^[v]} indicates a vocal producer

== Personnel ==
Musicians

- Alessia Cara – vocals (all tracks), drums (1, 2)
- Jon Levine – bass, keyboards, programming (1, 2, 7, 12, 13); guitar (1, 2, 7, 13), piano (1, 2), drums, percussion (7, 12, 13)
- Cameron Bright – background vocals, guitar, programming (3)
- Andrew McAnsh – trumpet (3)
- Johann Deterville – bass, keyboards, percussion, piano (4)
- Salaam Remi – bass, drums, guitar, percussion (5)
- Vincent Henry – guitar (5)
- Brandee Younger – harp (5)
- Mike Wise – programming (6, 8, 10, 14, 17); guitar, keyboards percussion (17)
- Dylan Wiggins – bass, guitar, keyboards, programming (9)
- Doc McKinney – keyboards, percussion, programming (9)
- Greg Kurstin – bass, drums, guitar, keyboards (11)
- Bianca McClure – strings (12)
- Spencer Stewart – bass, drums, guitar, keyboards, percussion, programming (13)
- Jason Evigan – guitar, keyboards (13)
- Herag Sanbalian – guitar (14, 17), bass (17)
- Jake Torrey – guitar (16)
- Halatrax – keyboards, percussion, programming (16)
- Andrew McEnaney – drums (17)
- Aaron Paris – strings (17)
- Joel Little – drum programming, guitar, keyboards (18)

Technical

- Chris Gehringer – mastering
- Manny Marroquin – mixing (1–4, 6–12, 14–18)
- Salaam Remi – mixing (5)
- Spencer Stewart – mixing (13), recording (7, 12, 13)
- Jon Levine – recording (1, 2, 7, 12)
- Alessia Cara – recording (3, 11, 16, 18)
- Cameron Bright – recording (3)
- Banx & Ranx – recording (4)
- Boi-1da – recording (4)
- Don Mills – recording (4)
- YogiTheProducer – recording (4)
- Ryan Evans – recording (5)
- Mike Wise – recording (6, 8, 10, 14, 17)
- Dylan Wiggins – recording (9)
- Doc McKinney – recording (9)
- Dan Cinelli – recording (9)
- Greg Kurstin – recording (11)
- Julian Burg – recording (11)
- Billboard – recording (15)
- Halatrax – recording (16)
- Jake Torrey – recording (16)
- Joel Little – recording (18)

Artwork

- Alessia Cara – creative direction
- James Ronkko – design
- Mary Chen – photography
- Andy Proctor – package production

== Charts ==
Chart performance
Chart (2021)	Peak position
Canadian Albums (Billboard)	83
US Top Album Sales (Billboard)	81
