= The Good Times =

Studio album by Afroman
- Released: August 28, 2001
- Genres: Alternative hip-hop; comedy hip-hop; underground hip-hop; dirty rap; southern hip-hop
- Length: 58:35
- Labels: Uptown; Universal
- Producers: Afroman; Dolowite; Headfridge; Loppy Octopus; Savalas Brothers

Afroman chronology
Sell Your Dope (2000)	The Good Times (2001)	Afroholic... The Even Better Times (2004)

Singles from The Good Times
- 1. "Crazy Rap" Released: September 6, 2001; 2. "Because I Got High" Released: October 15, 2001

Professional ratings
Review scores
Source	Rating
AllMusic	3.5/5 stars
The Daily Vault	F
Q	3/5 stars
RapReviews	7/10
Rolling Stone	3/5 stars

The Good Times is the fourth studio album by Los Angeles-based rapper Afroman. It was released after his record deal with Universal Records, and is composed of material taken from his previous independent releases. It contains his two hit singles: "Because I Got High" and "Crazy Rap", along with his other popular songs from his two albums. Most of the songs on the album are about growing up in the ghetto of East Palmdale. The album was certified gold in the United States on October 24, 2001 by the RIAA.

== Track listing ==
1. "Because I Got High" (radio edit) – 3:20
2. "Crazy Rap" – 5:55
3. "She Won't Let Me Fuck" – 6:03
4. "Hush" – 4:42
5. "Tumbleweed" – 5:23
6. "Let's All Get Drunk" – 5:54
7. "Tall Cans" – 7:14
8. "Palmdale" – 6:42
9. "Mississippi" – 5:34
10. "The American Dream" – 2:53
11. "Because I Got High" (extended version) – 5:10

Notes

- "Mississippi" was remade for The Good Times, and is not the same as the original Because I Got High version.

== Charts ==
=== Weekly charts ===
Weekly chart performance for The Good Times
Chart (2001)	Peak position
Austrian Albums (Ö3 Austria)	36
French Albums (SNEP)	95
German Albums (Offizielle Top 100)	40
New Zealand Albums (RMNZ)	42
UK Albums (Official Charts)	96
US Billboard 200	10
US Top R&B/Hip-Hop Albums (Billboard)	9

=== Year-end charts ===
Year-end chart performance for The Good Times
Chart (2001)	Position
Canadian R&B Albums (Nielsen SoundScan)	58
Canadian Rap Albums (Nielsen SoundScan)	28
US Billboard 200	167

== Certifications ==
Certifications for The Good Times
Region	Certification	Certified units/sales
United States (RIAA)	Gold	500,000^{^}
^{^} Shipments figures based on certification alone.
