= Yuno Miles =

American rapper

- Genre: Comedy hip-hop
- Occupations: Rapper; internet personality
- Instrument: Vocals
- Years active: 2019–present
- Labels: Hallwood; Trash Bag

Yuno Miles is an American rapper and internet personality. Miles began his music career in 2019, gaining significance from 2021 onwards for his "bizarre" lyrics and a lack of rhythm combined with underground production. Miles gained more prominence in 2024 following his collaborations with American rapper Kanye West on his album Vultures 2. West and his daughter, musician North West, both named Miles as one of their favorite music artists. His debut studio album, Album, was released on November 29, 2025.

== Career ==
Miles is from Michigan. Debuting in 2019 on SoundCloud and YouTube with the song "Pokémon", his music career first received attention in 2021 through the social media platform TikTok. He is known for being a "meme rapper", incorporating comedic hip-hop into his music. Miles often mocks his own music on TikTok with humorous captions. In 2023 he was in a brief rap feud with former collaborator Yuno Marr. He went viral in 2024 for his song released the prior year, "Martin Luther King", which featured comical and stilted singing thanking Martin Luther King Jr. for his ability to "rap and trap". Miles played his first live show in February 2024 at the Crofoot. He then commenced his first tour in August of that year, beginning in the American state of Iowa. After performing the first show, Miles cancelled the rest of the tour.

Miles was featured in the song "Bomb" from Vultures 2 by hip-hop superduo ¥$. He also had a cameo in the music video, seen in a high-speed chase scene wearing a black mask. Miles performed the song with West in August 2024 at a South Korean listening party for Vultures 2. Miles was announced as part of the 2025 lineup for the California edition of the Rolling Loud festival. However, he later announced on a YouTube video that he would not be performing due to "personal issues", then releasing a song regarding his departure. In 2025, he collaborated with the music critic Anthony Fantano on the song "Take Me Back". Fantano also appeared in the music video of the song, released on October 19.

Miles released his debut studio album, Album, on November 29, 2025. It featured 13 tracks, including a collaboration with Fantano on "Bobo's Chicken". After Fantano published a review of the album, rating it 0/10, Miles collaborated with Fantano on a Diss track titled "Fantano Diss", wherein Fantano conceded his argument and stated that it was better than other projects he has reviewed (including Vultures 2). "Fantano Diss" was released on December 12. In March 2026, he released the song "Cruel World" which was a departure of style from his previous releases, which was noted by HotNewHipHop as Miles taking the song on a "serious tone".

== Artistry and influence ==
Miles's style of rapping has been described as comedic, characterized by a high-pitched, out-of-tune delivery and "bizarre" lyrics. His music incorporates an intentional lack of rhythm and underground production. His songs typically feature arrhythmic flows, exaggerated falsetto, and lyrics that are absurd or provocative. Miles's work was described as "ostrich-squeal-rap" by Pitchfork, describing his "flow" as "dexterous and inventive". HotNewHipHop referred to his rhymes as a "border on parody".

American rapper Kanye West, who has collaborated with Miles, has named him as his favorite rapper in February 2025. His daughter, musician North West, named Miles as one of her favorite music artists and her favorite rapper. He has also collaborated with music critic Anthony Fantano on multiple songs.

== Discography ==
=== Studio albums ===
Title	Year
Album	2025

=== Mixtapes ===
Title	Year
Go on Tour Yuno	2023
YNX	2025

=== EPs ===
Title	Year
Knock Knock It's Santa Bitch	2022
Yuno History	2024
Sound of Memories (with Esei)	2024
Yunotopia	2024
This is Not the Album	2024

== Videography ==
=== Music videos ===
Title	Year	Other artist(s)	Note
"Bomb"	2024	North West, Chicago West	
