= 10 Things I Hate About You (song) =

Single by Leah Kate

from the EP Alive and Unwell
- Written: 2022
- Released: March 23, 2022
- Genre: Pop-punk
- Length: 2:37
- Label: Capitol; Leah Kate; TenThousand; Universal
- Songwriters: Leah Kalmenson; Mike Wise; Madi Yanofski
- Producer: Wise

Leah Kate singles chronology
"Dear Denny" (2022)	"10 Things I Hate About You" (2022)	"Twinkle Twinkle Little Bitch" (2022)

Music video
- "10 Things I Hate About You" on YouTube

"10 Things I Hate About You" is a song by American singer Leah Kate from her third extended play, Alive and Unwell (2022). It was released independently on March 23, 2022. The track was written by Kate, Mike Wise, and Madi Yanofski, with Wise handling the production. A pop-punk song, Kate wrote a list of things she disliked about an ex from a previous relationship she was trying to get over, which later turned into a song. It went viral on TikTok.

== Background and release ==
Kate moved to New York to pursue a career in music. She had gotten a job there, but was fired because she was spending "so much time" working on her music. Her 2020 single "Fuck Up the Friendship" was noticed by American entrepreneur Alexis Ohanian on Indify, a startup which helps promote independent artists, who then helped Kate get in touch with digital marketing company Creed Media. The aforementioned company promoted the song on the online video platform TikTok where it went viral, and later on the social networking service Instagram. In 2021, she released her debut album titled What Just Happened?.

Kate wrote "10 Things I Hate About You" with Mike Wise and Madi Yanofski, while Wise also produced it. The track was written in 2022. The song was independently released on March 23, 2022, for digital download and streaming. It was sent to contemporary hit radio stations by TenThousand and Capitol in the United States on May 10, 2022, and for radio airplay in Italy by Universal on June 3, 2022.

== Composition and reception ==
"10 Things I Hate About You" is a pop-punk song. Although the song shares the same name as a 1999 film, Kate revealed in an interview with iHeartRadio that the movie did not serve as the inspiration for it. She was trying to move on from a past relationship which resulted in her making a list of things she disliked about the ex-boyfriend from that relationship. Kate told Rolling Stone that the list contained 50 reasons "why [she] shouldn't miss him and why [she] should hate him" and that "it very quickly turned into a song".

Rachel Brodsky of Stereogum called it a "punchy fuck-you anthem" and compared it to the likes of Olivia Rodrigo and Gayle. It went viral on TikTok and was used in over 580,000 videos as of June 24, 2022. Commercially, "10 Things I Hate About You" reached the top 30 in Australia and the United Kingdom. In the United States, it peaked at numbers two and 20 on Billboard's Bubbling Under Hot 100 Singles and Mainstream Top 40 charts, respectively.

== Music video ==
A visualizer for the song was released on March 25, 2022, on Kate's YouTube channel. The official music video premiered on June 1 and was directed by Jason Lester. In the visual, Kate is giving a press conference, and throughout the video, interspersed shots show her being "surrounded by a gang of girls." As of June 2024, the music video has amassed over 1.6 million views while the visualizer has over 8 million views.

== Personnel ==
Credits adapted from AllMusic.

- Leah Kate – lead vocals, songwriter
- Colin Leonard – mastering engineer
- Mitch McCarthy – mixing
- Mike Wise – songwriter, producer
- Madi Yanofski – songwriter

== Charts ==
Chart performance for "10 Things I Hate About You"
Chart (2022)	Peak position
Australia (ARIA)	22
Canada (Canadian Hot 100)	82
Global 200 (Billboard)	116
Ireland (IRMA)	34
Netherlands (Single Tip)	21
Netherlands (Tipparade)	15
New Zealand Hot Singles (Recorded Music NZ)	18
UK Singles (Official Charts)	30
US Bubbling Under Hot 100 Singles (Billboard)	2
US Pop Airplay (Billboard)	20

== Certifications ==
Certifications and sales for "10 Things I Hate About You"
Region	Certification	Certified units/sales
Brazil (Pro-Música Brasil)	Gold	20,000^{‡}
United Kingdom (BPI)	Gold	400,000^{‡}
United States (RIAA)	Gold	500,000^{‡}
^{‡} Sales+streaming figures based on certification alone.

== Release history ==
Release dates and formats for "10 Things I Hate About You"
Region	Date	Format	Label	Ref.
Various	March 23, 2022	Digital download; streaming	Leah Kate	
United States	May 10, 2022	Contemporary hit radio	TenThousand; Capitol	
Italy	June 3, 2022	Radio airplay	Universal	
