= Jobe Bells =

Studio album by Afroman
- Released: November 2, 2004
- Genre: Hip hop
- Length: 29:07
- Label: Hungry Hustler
- Producer: Afroman

Afroman chronology
Afroholic... The Even Better Times (2004)	Jobe Bells (2004)	4R0:20 (2004)

Professional ratings
Review scores
Source	Rating
AllMusic	2/5 stars
Disco Mix Club	3/5

Jobe Bells is a Christmas-themed hip hop album from independent rapper Afroman, released in 2004. It contains drug/sex themed parodies of various Christmas songs, such as the "12 Days of Christmas" and "Silent Night". The album received an unfavorable review from Rolling Stone.

== Track listing ==
1. "Deck My Balls" (Intro) – 1:30
2. "Violent Night" – 5:51
3. "12 J's of Christmas" – 2:18
4. "Jobe Bells" – 2:09
5. "O Chronic Tree" – 1:25
6. "A Strainj Poem" – 2:54
7. "Death to the World" – 1:07
8. "Palmbells" – 1:04
9. "Nutscracker" – 1:38
10. "An Even Strainjer Poem" – 4:15
11. "12 J's of Christmas" (Instrumental) – 3:15
12. "I Wish You Would Roll a New Blunt" – 1:41
