= Crazy Rap =

2001 single by Afroman

Single by Afroman

from the album Sell Your Dope and The Good Times
- Released: September 6, 2001
- Genre: Hip-hop; comedy hip-hop
- Length: 5:53 (original album version); 5:29 (Spotify release); 3:11 (Now 51 version)
- Label: T-Bones
- Songwriter: Joseph "Afroman" Foreman
- Producers: Joseph "Afroman" Foreman; The Savalas Brothers

Afroman singles chronology
"Because I Got High" (2001)	"Crazy Rap" (2001)	"Palmdale Pimp" (2008)

"Crazy Rap", also known as "Colt 45 and 2 Zig-Zags" or simply "Colt 45", is a song by American rapper Afroman. It was featured on his third studio album, Sell Your Dope, and was later included on his greatest hits album, The Good Times. It is often referred to as "Colt 45", as the hook states "Colt 45 and two Zig-Zags, baby that's all we need".

== Track listing ==
1. "Crazy Rap"
2. "Crazy Rap" (Accapella)
3. "Crazy Rap" (Afrolicious Mix)
4. "Outro"

== Music video ==
The video takes place in front of a liquor store in Los Angeles, and shows Afroman telling his story to his friends, while dancing and crip walking to the beat with them, and others who join in. It also shows him in the various situations he describes, such as riding in a car, being chased by a klansman, and multiple sexual encounters with women, some of which include a green-haired transgender woman from Hollywood, California, and another woman whom he seemingly cannot please, until her father walks in on them, and violently beats Afroman as retaliation for having sexual relations with his daughter. The last line is a homage to "Rapper's Delight".

This is a remade version of the song which was first featured on Afroman's debut album My Fro-losophy, which was released independently without a record label.

== Charts ==
=== Weekly charts ===
Chart (2001–2002)	Peak position
Australia (ARIA)	99
Austria (Ö3 Austria Top 40)	41
Belgium (Ultratop 50 Flanders)	39
Belgium (Ultratip Bubbling Under Wallonia)	11
Germany (GfK)	37
Ireland (IRMA)	7
Netherlands (Single Top 100)	52
Norway (VG-lista)	13
Switzerland (Schweizer Hitparade)	76
UK Singles (Official Charts)	10

=== Year-end charts ===
Chart (2002)	Position
UK Singles (OCC)	160

== Certifications ==
Region	Certification	Certified units/sales
United States (RIAA)	3× Platinum	3,000,000^{‡}
^{‡} Sales+streaming figures based on certification alone.
