= Because I Got High (album) =

Studio album by Afroman
- Released: June 20, 2000
- Recorded: 2000
- Genre: Hip hop
- Length: 1:10:25
- Label: T-Bones
- Producer: Joseph "Afroman" Foreman; Loppy Octopus; Jim Ramonofsky

Afroman chronology
My Fro-losophy (1999)	Because I Got High (2000)	Sell Your Dope (2000)

Singles from Because I Got High
- 1. "Because I Got High" Released: October 15, 2001

Professional ratings
Review scores
Source	Rating
AllMusic	3.5/5 stars

Because I Got High is the second studio album by Mississippi-based rapper Afroman. The record was released on T-Bones Records in 2000, and it was also sold and distributed via live performances. The title track of the record stands as Afroman's most popular and best-selling song.

Because I Got High went to Number One on the New Zealand charts, where it stayed for four weeks, in 2000. The songs "Because I Got High", "Mississippi", "Hush", "Tumbleweed", "She Won't Let Me Fuck", "Tall Cans" and "American Dream" would all later be used on The Good Times in 2001.

== Track listing ==
No.	Title	Length
1.	"Because I Got High"	5:10
2.	"Mississippi"	5:58
3.	"Girls"	4:23
4.	"You Ain't My Friend"	6:05
5.	"Hush"	4:39
6.	"Tumbleweed"	4:39
7.	"Dopefiend"	7:20
8.	"She Won't Let Me Fu*k"	6:01
9.	"Tall Cans"	7:11
10.	"Back on the Bus"	5:43
11.	"Graveyard Shift"	5:22
12.	"Because I Got High" (Radio Edit)	4:20
13.	"American Dream"	2:52
Total length:		1:10:25

== Personnel ==
- Joseph Foreman – vocals, songwriting, production, engineering
- Loppy Octopus – production
- Jim Ramonofsky – production
