= T-Bones Records =

- Founded: Mississippi, United States
- Founder: Tim Ramenofsky
- Genre: hip hop, trip hop, jazz fusion, experimental, heavy metal, crossover thrash
- Country of origin: US
- Location: Hattiesburg, MS
- Official website: https://headfridge.bandcamp.com/

T-Bones Records is a record label founded by producer Tim Ramenofsky (aka "Headfridge"). The label was born in Hattiesburg, Mississippi when Ramenofsky was a member of the metal fusion band Loppybogymi. In 2000, Ramenofsky discovered rapper Afroman and produced the album, "Because I Got High". The record was originally released on T-Bones Records. The title track was soon posted on file-sharing service Napster and made it to The Howard Stern Show. This song was the theme song of the film Jay and Silent Bob Strike Back and was later featured in the films Disturbia and The Perfect Score. "Because I Got High" was nominated for the Grammy Award for Best Rap Solo Performance in 2002.

T-Bones Records is known for releasing artists who mix and mash up various genres, including the jazz-funk-metal sound of Loppybogymi, to the trip hop mix of Savalas Brothers(which is Ramenofsky moniker on the Afroman tracks), to the jazz-fusion of Dukes of Jazzard, to the punk-metal fusion of The Cooters.

== Discography ==
- Loppybogymi "Tup" (1998)
- FRŌDÅWG "MetåmōFrōsïs" (1998)
- Sexual Honky "In Stereo" (1998)
- Afroman "Sell Your Dope" (1999)
- Dukes of Jazzard "Live" (1999)
- Afroman "Because I Got High" (2000)
- Various Artists "T-Bone's War of the Worlds" (2000)
- Dolowite "Watch Yo Ass" (2000)
- Loppy Octopus "Loppy Octopus" (2001)
- Savalas Brothers "Tough Guy" (2001)
- Cookout "Ear Fashion" (2002)
- The Cooters "The Moon Will Rise Again" (2002)
- Savalas Brothers "Pimp Knuckle" (2002)
- Headfridge "Cool Out" (2002)
- Headfridge "Mood Elevator featuring Lhay Browning" (2005)
- Headfridge "Rogue Fugu" (2006)
- Headfridge "Space Honky" (2013)
- Headfridge "YoDrumbo" (2015)
- Dukes of Jazzard "Unearthed Boot (Live in 1999)" (2016)
- The Big Naturals "YoDrumbo Live at the Fox" (2016)
- Headfridge "headfridge duz Asia" (2016)
