= Sell Your Dope =

Studio album by Afroman
- Released: September 12, 2000
- Recorded: 2000
- Genre: Hip hop
- Length: 74:59 (original); 71:57 (re-release)
- Label: T-Bones; Hungry Hustler
- Producer: Joseph "Afroman" Foreman

Afroman chronology
| Because I Got High (2000) | Sell Your Dope (2000) | The Good Times (2001) |

Singles from Sell Your Dope
- 1. "Crazy Rap" Released: September 6, 2001

Sell Your Dope is the third studio album by Afroman, first published by T-Bones Records on September 12, 2000. It contains the hit single "Crazy Rap", also known as "Colt 45 and 2 Zig-Zags". The album was re-released on streaming services on August 17, 2020, under the name Sell Your Dope (OG Re-Release).

== Track listing ==
=== Original version ===
1. "Basehead Boogie"
2. "Palmdale"
3. "Crazy Rap"
4. "Let's All Get Drunk"
5. "If It Ain't Free"
6. "Sell Your Dope"
7. "There's a Price 2 Pay"
8. "Paranoid"
9. "Strugglin' n' Strivin'"
10. "Let Me Out"
11. "Bacc 2 School"
12. "Hungry Hustler"
13. "God Has Smiled on Me"

Notes

- "Let's All Get Drunk" is not included on the re-release
- "Bacc 2 School" is longer on the re-release. Its original length is 5:46.

=== Re-release ===
Credits adapted from Tidal, and reflect the 2020 re-release.

All tracks are written by and produced by Joseph Edgar Foreman, except "Bacc 2 School", co-written and produced by John P Randall.

| No. | Title | Length |
|---|---|---|
| 1. | "Basehead Boogie" | 4:23 |
| 2. | "Palmdale" | 6:40 |
| 3. | "Crazy Rap" | 5:54 |
| 4. | "If It Ain't Free" | 5:51 |
| 5. | "Sell Your Dope" | 5:44 |
| 6. | "There's a Price 2 Pay" | 6:17 |
| 7. | "Paranoid" | 6:04 |
| 8. | "Strugglin' n' Strivin'" | 6:05 |
| 9. | "Let Me Out" | 4:23 |
| 10. | "Bacc 2 School" | 8:21 |
| 11. | "Hungry Hustler" | 6:14 |
| 12. | "God Has Smiled on Me" | 6:00 |
| Total length: | | 71:57 |
