= Because I Got High =

2001 single by Afroman

Single by Afroman

from the album Because I Got High, Music from the Dimension Motion Picture Jay and Silent Bob Strike Back and The Good Times
- Released: October 15, 2001 (EU)
- Recorded: 2000
- Genre: Comedy hip-hop
- Length: 5:10 (album version); 3:19 (radio version)
- Label: T-Bones; Universal; Uptown
- Songwriter: Afroman
- Producers: Afroman; Headfridge

Afroman singles chronology
"Because I Got High" (2001)	"Crazy Rap" (2001)

Music video
- Afroman – "Because I Got High" on YouTube

"Because I Got High" is a comedy hip-hop song by American rapper Afroman from the 2000 album of the same name and released as a single the following year. The lyrics of the song humorously describe how cannabis use is degrading the narrator's quality of life. The song, which was written in only a few minutes, gained popularity after it was featured on The Howard Stern Show and circulated on the Internet.

== Overview ==
The lyrics relate the narrator's experience of planning to do several things, but failing to do so after having smoked marijuana. The song was written in a few minutes, and was reportedly motivated by the singer's realization that "everyone talks about smoking weed, but no one ever really talks about the effects of marijuana".

In the August 20, 2001 issue of Time magazine, the song was described as a "tribute to pot". Afroman is quoted as commenting, "You know what, dude? I made this tape for all my homeboys. I didn’t think I’d be talking to Time magazine. I’m a little worried about Rush Limbaugh and Newt Gingrich. I don’t want to get anybody riled up. I just figured, since I’m 'a pothead, why can’t me and the other potheads have a little joke between ourselves." The singer refused to label the song "anti- or pro-pot", saying, "I told the reality of the story. I spoke about my individual experience smoking marijuana, and my summary was, if you don't watch it, it will be too time-consuming." The song was said to have afforded Afroman one-hit wonder status.

The music video was directed by Kevin Smith, who features in the video alongside Jason Mewes as the duo Jay and Silent Bob smoking with Afroman, as well as a cameo by "Beer Man", and a glimpse of the Quick Stop where Clerks was filmed.

== Reception ==
Afroman released his album Because I Got High in 2000, distributing it mainly through concerts. The title track was featured on The Howard Stern Show, boosting its popularity, and was also widely shared on the file-sharing service Napster. This rise in popularity led to a Grammy Award nomination for Best Rap Solo Performance. It was used as the theme song of the film Jay and Silent Bob Strike Back and was later featured in the films The Perfect Score (2004), Disturbia (2007), and A Thousand Words (2012), and the TV show Snowpiercer.

After the success of the song, Afroman was signed to Universal Records.

== Track listing ==
All tracks are written by Joseph Foreman.

CD single
No.	Title	Length
1.	"Because I Got High" (Afrolicious Edit)	3:18
2.	"Let's All Get Drunk"	5:43
3.	"Back On The Bus"	5:43
4.	"Because I Got High" (Afropulco Gold & Dirty)	3:18

== Alternative versions ==
Afroman re-recorded the song in 2014, in the context of heightened debate around the legal status of cannabis in the United States, partnering with cannabis reform nonprofit Norml and Weedmaps, expressing a pro-legalization stance highlighting the purported economic and health potential of the drug. This version was published ahead of several ballot measures dealing with the legalization of recreational cannabis, use scheduled for 4 November of that year in the American states of Alaska, Oregon, and the District of Columbia.

In 2024, the singer again released an alternate version of the song titled "Hunter got high", commenting on the Hunter Biden laptop controversy and on allegations of drug use.

A song with a similar theme was released by Detroit Junior in 1980, titled "If I Hadn't Been High."

== Parodies and references ==
Bob Rivers included a Christmas-themed version, Be Claus I Got High, on the 2002 album White Trash Christmas, the fifth in Rivers's line of Christmas parody albums.

BBC Radio 1 DJ Chris Moyles recorded a parody under the pseudonym "Afro-Blair" featuring Jon Culshaw and another impressionist singing in the guise of the serving prime minister Tony Blair, then Leader of the Opposition William Hague and former prime minister John Major and Margaret Thatcher.

Parody artist Rucka Rucka Ali made a version of the song called "Because I'm White" about stereotypes of White Americans and white privilege in general.

A parody was made about British politician Michael Gove after his scandal involving cocaine use.

On the album Mobilize by punk band Anti-Flag, after several minutes of silence on the album's end track, a friend of the band called Spaz can be heard singing parts of the song with Anti-Flag.

Remy Munasifi made the parody "Because It Got High" about inflation for Reason TV.

== Charts ==
=== Weekly charts ===
Chart (2001–2002)	Peak position
Australia (ARIA)	1
Australian Urban (ARIA)	1
Austria (Ö3 Austria Top 40)	1
Belgium (Ultratop 50 Flanders)	1
Belgium (Ultratop 50 Wallonia)	3
Canada CHR (Nielsen BDS)	17
Croatia (HRT)	2
Denmark (Tracklisten)	1
Europe (European Hot 100 Singles)	2
Finland (Suomen virallinen lista)	6
France (SNEP)	2
Germany (GfK)	1
Ireland (IRMA)	1
Italy (FIMI)	9
Netherlands (Dutch Top 40)	6
Netherlands (Single Top 100)	3
New Zealand (Recorded Music NZ)	1
Norway (VG-lista)	1
Portugal (AFP)	2
Romania (Romanian Top 100)	35
Scottish Singles Sales (Official Charts)	1
Spain (Promusicae)	18
Sweden (Sverigetopplistan)	3
Switzerland (Schweizer Hitparade)	2
UK Singles (Official Charts)	1
UK Dance (Official Charts)	5
UK Hip Hop/R&B (Official Charts)	1
US Billboard Hot 100	13
US Alternative Airplay (Billboard)	17
US Hot R&B/Hip-Hop Songs (Billboard)	40
US Pop Airplay (Billboard)	25
US Rap Songs (Billboard)	19
US Rhythmic Airplay (Billboard)	6

=== Year-end charts ===
Chart (2001)	Position
Australia (ARIA)	14
Australian Urban (ARIA)	6
Austria (Ö3 Austria Top 40)	13
Belgium (Ultratop Flanders)	9
Europe (Eurochart Hot 100)	23
Germany (Official German Charts)	26
Ireland (IRMA)	11
Netherlands (Dutch Top 40)	42
Netherlands (Single Top 100)	28
Sweden (Sverigetopplistan)	36
Switzerland (Schweizer Hitparade)	23
UK Singles (Official Charts Company)	10
Chart (2002)	Position
Austria (Ö3 Austria Top 40)	20
Belgium (Ultratop Wallonia)	42
Europe (Eurochart Hot 100)	17
France (SNEP)	26
Switzerland (Schweizer Hitparade)	54

=== Decade-end charts ===
Chart (2000–2009)	Position
UK Singles (Official Charts Company)	71

== Certifications ==
Region	Certification	Certified units/sales
Australia (ARIA)	2× Platinum	140,000^{^}
Austria (IFPI Austria)	Platinum	40,000^{*}
Belgium (BRMA)	Platinum	50,000^{*}
Brazil (Pro-Música Brasil)	Platinum	60,000^{*}
Denmark (IFPI Danmark)	Platinum	8,000^{^}
France (SNEP)	Gold	250,000^{*}
Germany (BVMI)	Platinum	500,000^{^}
New Zealand (RMNZ)	Platinum	10,000^{*}
Switzerland (IFPI Switzerland)	Gold	20,000^{^}
United Kingdom (BPI)	Platinum	600,000^{‡}
United States (RIAA) Mastertone	Platinum	1,000,000^{*}
United States (RIAA) Digital	Platinum	1,000,000^{‡}
^{*} Sales figures based on certification alone.^{^} Shipments figures based on certification alone.^{‡} Sales+streaming figures based on certification alone.
