= Lemon Pound Cake =

2022 album by Afroman

Studio album by Afroman
- Released: September 30, 2022
- Genre: Hip-hop
- Length: 61:14
- Label: Hungry Hustler
- Producer: Afroman

Afroman chronology
Save a Cadillac, Ride a Homeboy (2020)	Lemon Pound Cake (2022)	Famous Player (2023)

Lemon Pound Cake is the 18th studio album by American rapper Afroman, released on September 30, 2022.

== Background ==
In August 2022, the Adams County, Ohio Sheriff's Department raided Foreman's home on suspicion of drug trafficking and kidnapping, which turned out to be false. Foreman criticized the police for causing $20,000 in damages to his home and for a missing $400 from $5,000 that they had seized. The album mocks the officers involved in the raid in songs such as the titular track (a parody of The Drifters' "Under the Boardwalk") and "Will You Help Me Repair My Door", the music videos of which garnered 6 and 12 million views respectively on YouTube. The album led to a defamation suit against Foreman by the officers involved in the raid. Foreman won a jury verdict in the defamation case in March 2026, successfully arguing that the videos constituted protected speech rather than actionable defamation.

== Track listing ==
All tracks are written by Joseph Foreman, except where noted.

No.	Title	Writer(s)	Length
1.	"The Police Raid"		1:42
2.	"Lemon Pound Cake"	Foreman; Kenny Young; Arthur Resnick	3:08
3.	"Why You Disconnecting My Video Camera"		4:41
4.	"I'm a Have a Good Time"		7:04
5.	"Sign My Titties"		4:50
6.	"Wet Tight Energy"		4:17
7.	"H.A.D. (Hard Ass Dicc)"		3:05
8.	"I Need $"	Adam C. Muñiz	3:25
9.	"Will You Help Me Repair My Door"		5:59
10.	"48 Hrs" (featuring Merkules)		3:34
11.	"It's All Right"		5:27
12.	"Holding On"		5:29
13.	"It Never Works"		3:59
14.	"Some Days When Your Life Is Hard"		4:31
Total length:			61:14

== Charts ==
Chart performance for Lemon Pound Cake
Chart (2026)	Peak position
US Top Comedy Albums (Billboard)	2
