= Leah Kate =

American singer

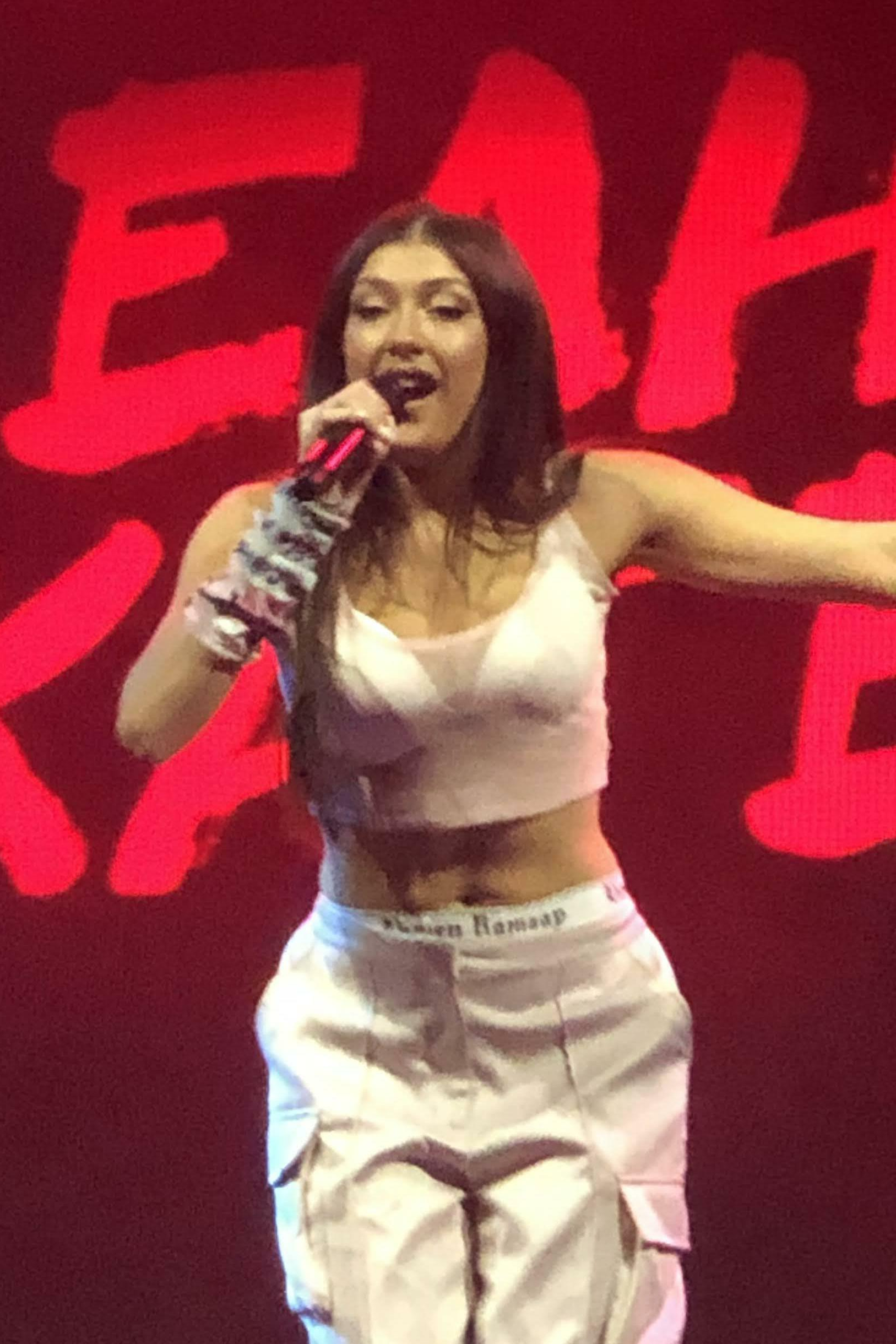
- Kate performing in 2022
- Born: Leah Kate Kalmenson; September 9, 1992 (age 34); Los Angeles County, California, U.S.
- Occupation: Singer
- Years active: 2018–present
- Musical career
- Genres: electropop; alternative rock
- Website: www.leahkatemusic.com

Leah Kate Kalmenson (born September 9, 1992) is an American singer. Kate released her debut extended play, Impulse, in June 2019 followed up by What Just Happened? in 2021. In 2022, she released the single "10 Things I Hate About You", along with "twinkle twinkle" which charted in Australia and the UK. She was then chosen as the support act for the European leg of Madison Beer's Life Support Tour, taking place in March and April 2022. She released her debut album, Super Over, in September 2023.

== Early life ==
Kate was born on September 9, 1992 to a Jewish family. She was born and raised in Los Angeles, California and her family owned a radio station. Kate lived in New York for a while to pursue a career in music.

== Career ==
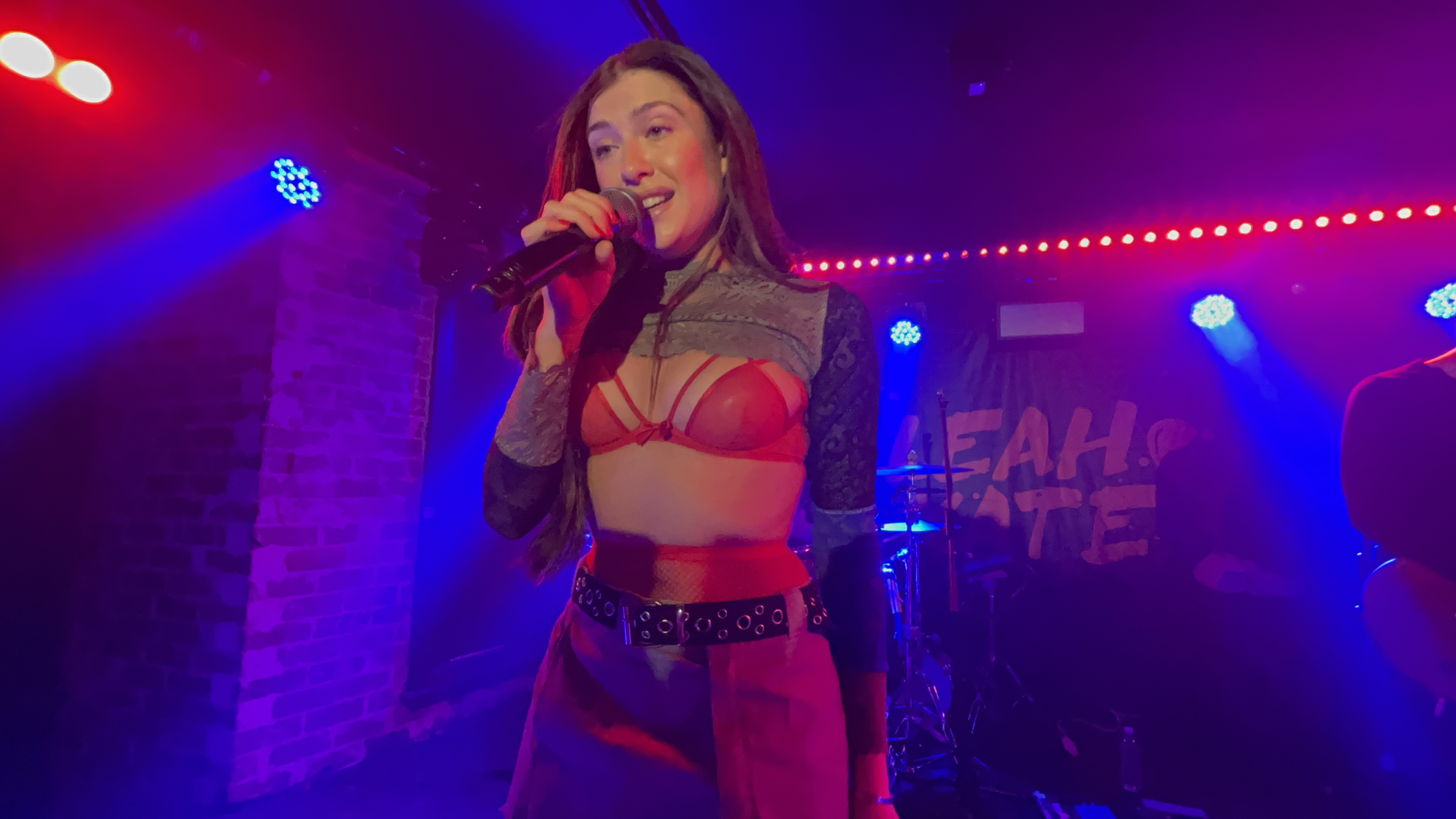
Kate performing in Sydney, Australia in December 2022.

In 2018, Kate began posting song covers on her self-titled YouTube channel. In this period of time she released her debut EP, Impulse, which included the singles "WTF?" and "So Good". She followed up the EP with the release of singles "Visions" and "Bad Idea". In June 2020, Kate released "Fuck Up the Friendship" which picked up traction on TikTok and was streamed over 33 million times on Spotify. She followed this up with several singles including the releases of "Grave", "Boyfriend" and "Boy Next Door".

In 2021, Kate released the singles "Calabasas" and "Veronica" in preparation for her second EP, What Just Happened?, which was due for release that October. She had plans to open up for Bailey Bryan on her Fresh Start Tour across the United States and Canada but it was cut to only two shows due to the COVID-19 pandemic.

She released the single "Dear Denny" in March 2022 and following it going viral on TikTok, quickly followed up with the release of "10 Things I Hate About You", her first song on a major label, 10k Projects. The song continued growing on TikTok and grew in many European countries as she toured with Madison Beer on the European leg of her Life Support Tour.

In 2022, she also toured with Chase Atlantic on their Cold Nights Tour across North America and released her single "Twinkle Twinkle". She followed this release with singles such as "Life Sux", "Monster", and "Hot All the Time", all included on her third EP, Alive and Unwell, which was released on October 28, 2022. She began her first headline tour, the Alive and Unwell Tour, in Manchester on the same day. In December 2022, Kate toured Australia for the first time, performing shows in Sydney and Melbourne. In September 2023, Kate released her debut album, Super Over.

In 2022, her song "Twinkle Twinkle" was panned by multiple critics. It was selected as one of the top five worst songs of the year by Business Insider. It was also named "One of the Worst Songs Ever" by Rolling Stone. In 2025, she was dropped by her former label, 10K Projects. Prior to being dropped, Kate publicly blamed the label for pressuring her into releasing "Twinkle Twinkle," claiming that the label had wanted to release a one million dollar music video for the song.

In June 2024, Kate released her single "What Girls Do". It was followed by various singles, until in August 2025, Kate announced her sophomore studio album, Genius. It was released on November 7, 2025.

== Discography ==
=== Studio albums ===
List of studio albums, with selected details
Title	Album details
Super Over	Released: September 15, 2023; Label: Self-released; Formats: Digital download, streaming, LP
Genius	Scheduled: November 7, 2025; Label: Self-released; Formats: Digital download, streaming

=== Extended plays ===
List of EPs, with selected details
Title	EP details
Impulse	Released: June 28, 2019; Label: Self-released; Formats: Digital download, streaming
What Just Happened?	Released: October 1, 2021; Label: Self-released; Formats: Digital download, streaming
Alive and Unwell	Released: October 28, 2022; Label: 10k Projects; Formats: Digital download, streaming

=== Singles ===
List of singles, with year released, selected chart positions, and album name shown
Title	Year	Peak chart positions						Certifications	Album
Title	Year	US Bub.	AUS	CAN	IRE	UK	WW	Certifications	Album
"I See You"	2018	—	—	—	—	—	—		Non-album singles
"LA"	2018	—	—	—	—	—	—		Non-album singles
"Have to Forget"	2018	—	—	—	—	—	—		Non-album singles
"WTF?"	2019	—	—	—	—	—	—		Non-album singles
"Left With a Broken Heart"	2019	—	—	—	—	—	—		Non-album singles
"So Good"	2019	—	—	—	—	—	—		Impulse
"Do What I Wanna Do"	2019	—	—	—	—	—	—		Impulse
"Visions" (with Kevin Courtois)	2019	—	—	—	—	—	—		Non-album singles
"Bad Idea"	2020	—	—	—	—	—	—		Non-album singles
"Fuck Up the Friendship"	2020	—	—	—	—	—	—		What Just Happened?
"Used to This"	2020	—	—	—	—	—	—		Non-album singles
"Grave"	2020	—	—	—	—	—	—		Non-album singles
"Boyfriend"	2021	—	—	—	—	—	—		Non-album singles
"Boy Next Door"	2021	—	—	—	—	—	—		Non-album singles
"Calabasas"	2021	—	—	—	—	—	—		What Just Happened?
"Veronica"	2021	—	—	—	—	—	—		What Just Happened?
"Shit Show"	2021	—	—	—	—	—	—		What Just Happened?
"F U Anthem"	2021	—	—	—	—	—	—		What Just Happened?
"Dear Denny"	2022	—	—	—	—	—	—		Non-album single
"10 Things I Hate About You"	2022	2	22	82	34	30	116	RIAA: Gold; BPI: Gold	Alive and Unwell
"Twinkle Twinkle Little Bitch"	2022	—	—	—	—	—	—		Non-album single
"Life Sux"	2022	—	—	—	—	—	—		Alive and Unwell
"Monster"	2022	—	—	—	—	—	—		Alive and Unwell
"Hot All the Time"	2022	—	—	—	—	—	—		Alive and Unwell
"Don't Call Me" (with Slushii)	2023	—	—	—	—	—	—		Non-album single
"Happy"	2023	—	—	—	—	—	—		Super Over
"Super Over"	2023	—	—	—	—	—	—		Super Over
"Space"	2023	—	—	—	—	—	—		Super Over
"Get In Loser"	2023	—	—	—	—	—	—		Super Over
"Bored"	2023	—	—	—	—	—	—		Super Over
"Unbreakup"	2023	—	—	—	—	—	—		Super Over
"Brainwash"	2023	—	—	—	—	—	—		Super Over
"What Girls Do"	2024	—	—	—	—	—	—		Non-album singles
"Nasty"	2024	—	—	—	—	—	—		Non-album singles
"WYA" (with 24kGoldn)	2024	—	—	—	—	—	—		Non-album singles
"Merry Bitchmas"	2024	—	—	—	—	—	—		Non-album singles
"Just Because"	2025	—	—	—	—	—	—		Non-album singles
"Selfish (feat. Leah Kate) [remix]" (with Daniel Arison)	2025	—	—	—	—	—	—		Non-album singles
"Dead Sexy Body"	2025	—	—	—	—	—	—		Non-album singles
"Act I: It Doesn't Take a Genius (To Ruin Everything)"	2025	—	—	—	—	—	—		Genius
"Act II: Too Hot to Learn My Lesson"	2025	—	—	—	—	—	—		Genius
"Act III: Self Destruction Counts As Character Development"	2025	—	—	—	—	—	—		Genius
"World's Best Ex- Girlfriend"	2026	—	—	—	—	—	—		Non-album singles
"Watch This" (with TAELA)	2026	—	—	—	—	—	—		Non-album singles
"—" denotes a recording that did not chart or was not released in that territory.

== Tours ==
Headlining

- Alive and Unwell Tour (2022)
- Super Over Tour (2023-2024)
- The Genius Tour (2026)

Opening

- Fresh Start Tour - Bailey Bryan (2021)
- Life Support Tour – Madison Beer (2022)
- Cold Nights Tour – Chase Atlantic (2022)
- Panorama Tour - Hayley Kiyoko (2023)
- The Unhealthy Club Tour - Anne-Marie (2023)
- Jess: The US Tour - Jess Glynne (2024)
