= Afroman =

American rapper (born 1974)

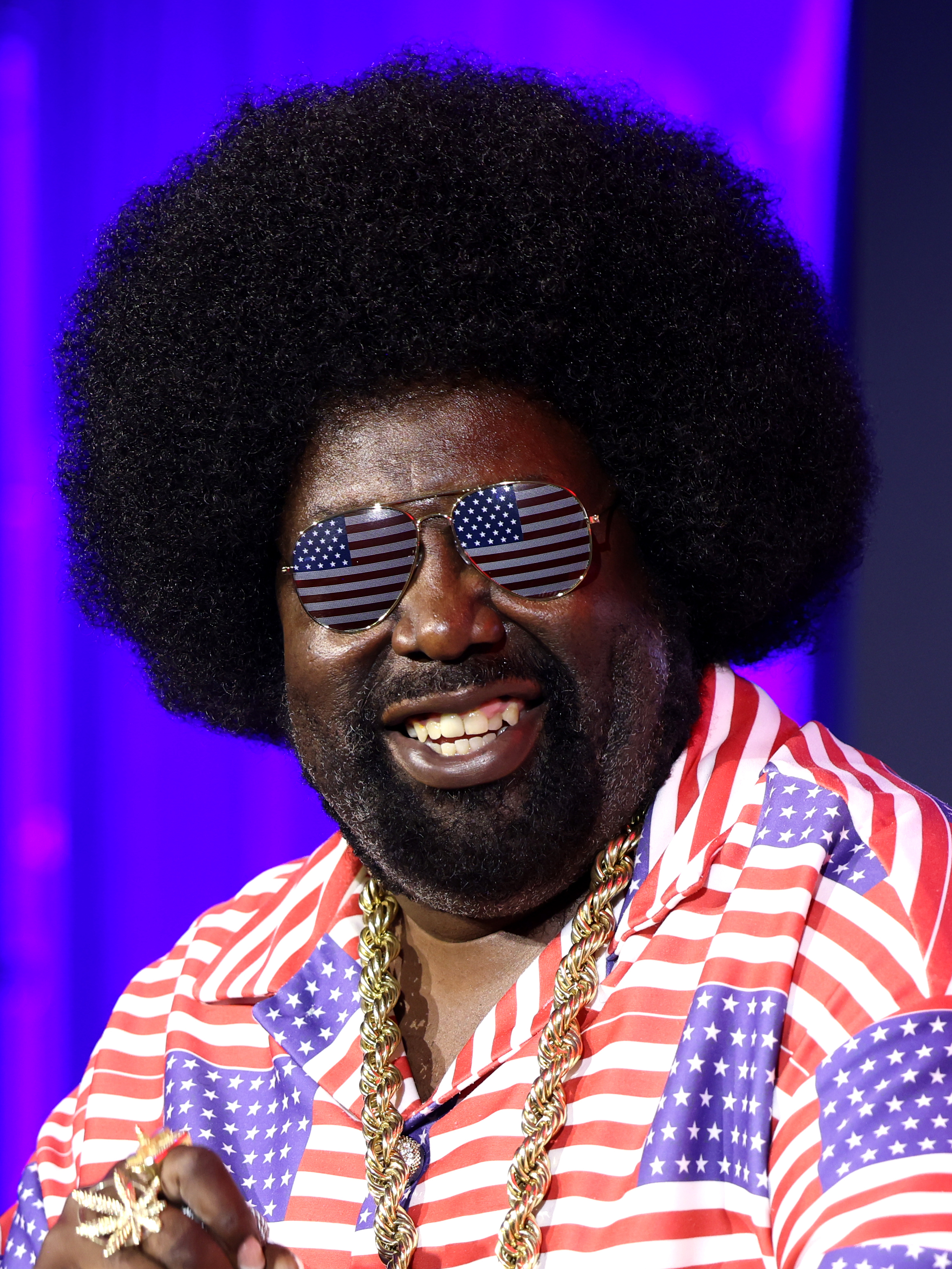
- Afroman in 2026
- Born: Joseph Edgar Foreman; July 28, 1974 (age 52); Los Angeles, California, U.S.
- Occupations: Singer; rapper; musician
- Years active: 1997–present
- Political party: Libertarian (since 2026)
- Children: 2
- Musical career
- Genres: Hip-hop; comedy hip-hop
- Instruments: Vocals; guitar; bass guitar; synthesizers; drums
- Labels: Cosmic Wire; Hungry Hustler; Federal; Fontana North; Universal; Uptown; T-Bones
- Website: ogafroman.com

Joseph Edgar Foreman (born July 28, 1974), known by his stage name Afroman, is an American rapper, singer, and musician. His fourth studio album, The Good Times (2001), featured the singles "Because I Got High" and "Crazy Rap". "Because I Got High" was nominated for a Grammy Award in 2002 for Best Rap Solo Performance.

Foreman wrote a number of protest songs to memorialize a 2022 raid of his Ohio home by sheriff's officers that yielded no charges or criminal evidence. The songs were collected into his 18th studio album, Lemon Pound Cake. Several officers sued Foreman for incorporating unflattering security camera footage of the raid into the songs' music videos. Foreman prevailed in court, arguing his work was protected by freedom of speech laws; in an amicus brief, the ACLU characterized the suit as a strategic lawsuit against public participation.

== Early life ==
Foreman was born on July 28, 1974, in Los Angeles. He lived for a short while in Mississippi before moving to South Central Los Angeles at an early age. He later lived in Palmdale in the High Desert, briefly in Las Vegas, and then in Hattiesburg, Mississippi.

== Career ==
The first song Foreman wrote was entitled "Hairy Carrie". Written during his time in middle school, it was a "diss song" about a student known for her harassment of fellow students' appearances.

In eighth grade he began recording mixtapes of homemade songs and selling them to classmates. He later recalled:

The first tape I made was about my eighth-grade teacher. She got me kicked out of school for sagging my pants, which was a big deal back then ... I wrote this song about her and it sold about 400 copies: it was selling to teachers, students, just about everybody ... I realized that, even though I wasn't at school, my song was at school, so in a way I was still there. All these people would come by my house just to give me comments about how cool they thought the song was.

Foreman performed in his church at a young age, playing drums and guitar. He dropped out of Palmdale High School in 1991.

In 1998, Foreman released his first album, My Fro-losophy, which was a flop. In 1999, he released Sell Your Dope and moved to Hattiesburg, Mississippi, where he met drummer Jody Stallone, keyboardist/bassist Darrell Havard, and producer Tim Ramenofsky (a.k.a. Headfridge). Foreman attributes his musical success in part to leaving southern California, saying that Midwesterners and Southerners were more willing than people in Los Angeles to experiment with their taste in music.

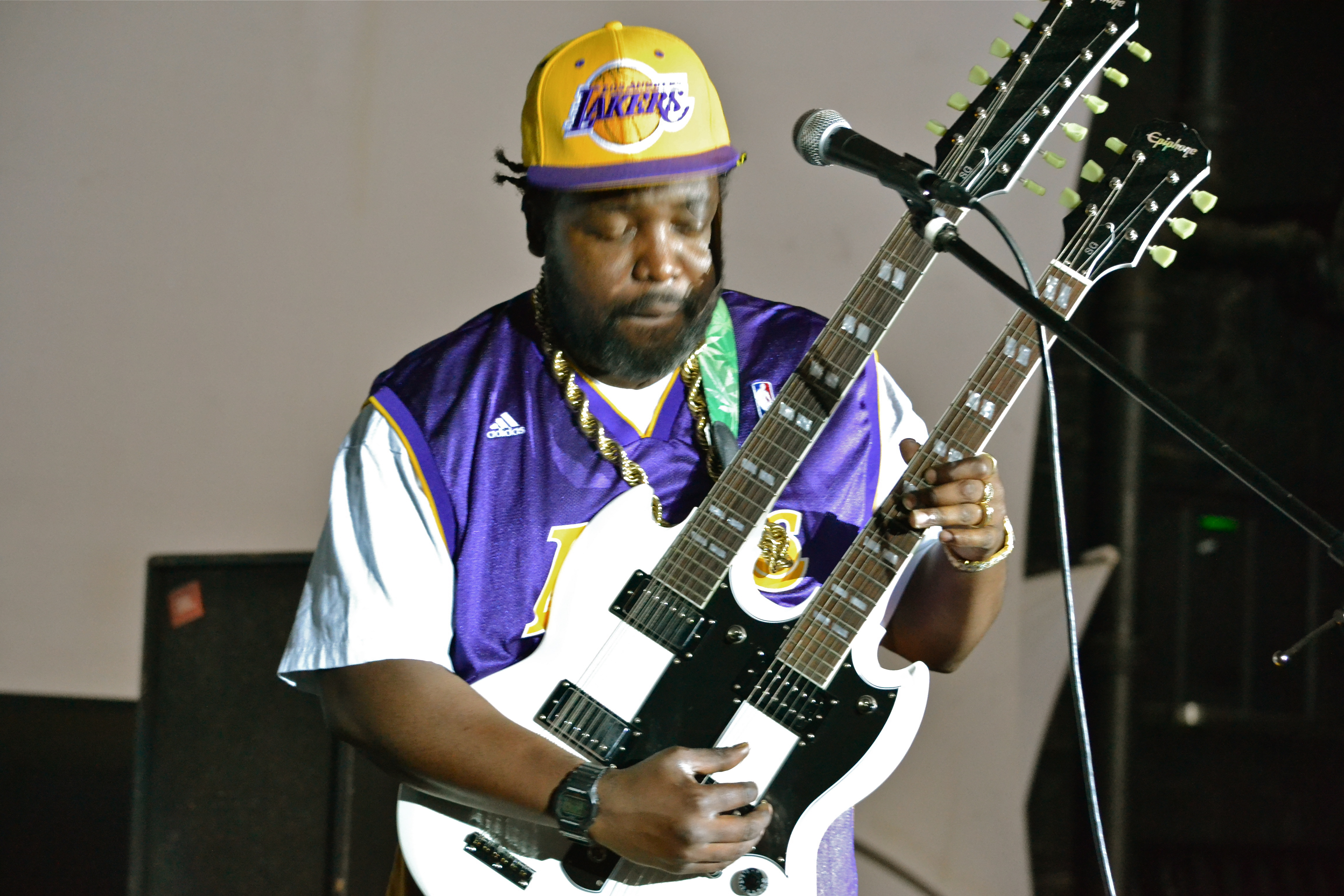
Afroman performing in 2011

Ramenofsky produced and released Foreman's album Because I Got High in 2000 on T-Bones Records; it was distributed primarily through local concerts and the file-sharing service Napster before the title track was played on The Howard Stern Show. The song humorously describes cannabis use degrading the narrator's quality of life. In late 2001, the song became a hit and was featured in the 2000s films Jay and Silent Bob Strike Back, The Perfect Score, and Disturbia. Because I Got High was nominated for the Grammy Award for Best Rap Solo Performance in 2002. Foreman joined the lineup of Cypress Hill's fall festival "Smoke Out" with Deftones, Method Man, and others. Universal Records signed Foreman to a six-album deal, and released The Good Times in 2001, a compilation of Foreman's first two albums together with new songs.

Foreman began releasing his music independently in 2004, mostly through the Internet, and that year, he recorded Jobe Bells, which satirized traditional Christmas songs. He was part of the 2010 Gathering of the Juggalos lineup. In October 2014, Foreman released a remix of "Because I Got High" to publicize the usefulness of cannabis, as part of the effort to legalize its sale across the United States.

== Presidential ambitions ==
On December 19, 2022, Foreman announced on Instagram that he would stand in the 2024 presidential election as an independent candidate. Foreman named Tennessee-based cannabis entrepreneur Jason Savage as his campaign manager, and Savage provided details of Foreman's political platform on Instagram shortly thereafter, citing inflation, the housing market, law enforcement corruption, and legalizing marijuana as key campaign issues. Foreman made an FEC filing on April 5, 2023.

On April 20, 2026, Foreman indicated that he would seek the nomination of the Libertarian Party in the 2028 presidential election.

== Personal life ==
In 2003, Foreman declared himself to be a Christian. He was previously married. As of 2026, he was not married; interviewed by Shannon Sharpe on Club Shay Shay, he said he did not intend to marry again. As of 2026, he lives in Adams County, Ohio.

== Legal issues ==
=== Assault case ===
On February 17, 2015, Foreman was midway through his performance at a music venue in Biloxi, Mississippi, when a woman walked on stage. While dancing and holding a drink, she approached him from behind. Surprised, Foreman swiftly reacted by punching her in the face and was escorted offstage by security. He was taken into custody, charged with assault, and released on bond.

Only 12 to 15 security guards had been on duty to manage a crowd in excess of 500. According to Foreman's representative, he had punched the woman in an involuntary reaction to the invasion of his personal space. Foreman said that he mistook her for another audience member who had been heckling him throughout the performance. He publicly apologized and sought assistance with anger management.

=== Raid on Ohio home ===
In August 2022, the Adams County Sheriff's Office in Ohio searched Foreman's home while he was in Chicago, on suspicion of kidnapping and drug trafficking. No evidence supporting the warrant's allegations was found and no charges were laid. The police search damaged his door, external gate, and security system which cost over $20,000 to repair. Officers seized over $5,000 of cash, which was returned with $400 missing. Foreman said he only had a few blunts and unused pipes.

Foreman posted about the experience on social media and criticized the officers for the raid and for damaging his property. He posted about a previous burglary on his home after which the sheriff's department threatened him with arrest if he kept checking about the progress of the case. He was told they did not have time to provide him with an update.

He recorded three songs criticizing the raid, titled "Will You Help Me Repair My Door", "Lemon Pound Cake"—set to the tune of "Under the Boardwalk" by The Drifters, and subsequently the title track of his 18th studio album—and "Why You Disconnecting My Video Camera." He released three music videos on December 29, 2022, composed primarily of security camera recordings of the raid. The music video for "Will You Help Me Repair My Door" was viewed over 14 million times, while "Lemon Pound Cake" was viewed 10 million times on the YouTube platform.

On March 14, 2023, seven sheriff's officers (Shawn Cooley, Justin Cooley, Michael Estep, Shawn Grooms, Brian Newland, Randolph Walters Jr., and Lisa Phillips) sued Foreman, alleging that his use of the video of the raid invaded their privacy. The suit said that the music videos and social media posts Foreman had made resulted in "humiliation, ridicule, mental distress, embarrassment and loss of reputation." The court dismissed the claim that he improperly used the officer's likeness for commercial purposes, but let the claims of defamation and false light go to trial. The trial began in March 2026, with Foreman taking the stand to testify on the second day. Throughout the trial, Foreman wore a suit and a pair of sunglasses adorned with US flags. On the stand, Foreman told jurors,

I got freedom of speech. After they run around my house with guns and kick down my door, I got the right to kick a can in my back yard, use my freedom of speech, and turn my bad times into a good time, yes I do[. ...] And I think I'm a sport for doing so, because I don't go to their house, kick down their doors [and] then try to play the victim and sue them.

Each of the plaintiffs also testified. The American Civil Liberties Union filed an amicus brief in the case, characterizing the case as an example of a strategic lawsuit against public participation. Foreman's lawyer also argued that the plaintiffs were public officials and thus held to a higher standard.

On March 18, 2026, a jury returned a full verdict in favor of Foreman, clearing him of any civil damages against the officers. Afterwards, Foreman saw a 500% increase in streaming.

== Discography ==
- Fro-Ever (1997)
- My Fro-losophy (1998)
- Because I Got High (2000)
- Sell Your Dope (2000)
- The Good Times (2001)
- Afroholic... The Even Better Times (2004)
- Jobe Bells (2004)
- 4R0:20 (2004)
- The Hungry Hustlerz: Starvation Is Motivation (2004)
- Drunk 'n' High (2006)
- A Colt 45 Christmas (2006)
- Waiting to Inhale (2008)
- Frobama: Head of State (2009)
- Marijuana Music (2013)
- The Frorider (2014)
- Happy to Be Alive (2016)
- Cold Fro-T-5 and Two Frigg Fraggs (2017)
- Save a Cadillac, Ride a Homeboy (2020)
- Happily Divorced (2020)
- Lemon Pound Cake (2022)
- Famous Player (2023)
- 20 Twenty-Fro (2024)
- Freedom of Speech (2026)
