= Frank Kostenko Jr. =

American film director

Frank Kostenko Jr. is a film director, assistant director, producer, and sometimes actor whose films include Man on Fire, The Last Samurai, We Were Soldiers, Magnificent Desolation, Slackers, The Hire: Beat the Devil, and Wishmaster among many others. Currently, he is the CEO and Executive Producer at PAC RIM Media (www.pacrimmedia.com), which he co-founded with Neal Allen.

Long before his Kostenko became an executive in the film industry, he got his start as a production assistant and as a set medic. His first film was the 1986 comedy, Modern Girls. He is a member of the Directors Guild of America and has been the Unit Production Manager for more than 50 feature films and television movies.

In addition to his work on feature films, Kostenko has been a Senior Program Manager for Landmark Entertainment Group, where he is currently the Executive Vice-President of Production.

His education background includes a Bachelor of Science degree in communications (minor in Economics) from The University of the State of New York, a Master of Science degree in System Engineering from Montana Tech, and a master's degree from the Command and General Staff College in Leavenworth, Kansas.

== Filmography ==
Credited as assistant director, second assistant director and second assistant director:

- Man on Fire
- The Last Samurai
- We Were Soldiers
- Magnificent Desolation
- Slackers
- The Hire: Beat the Devil
- Wishmaster
- Pie in the Sky
- The Temp (1993)
- Chrysalis (1993)
- Dogfight (film)
- Grand Isle
- The Indian Runner
- Popcorn
- Working Tra$h
- Criminal Act
- To Die For

Credited as producer:

- American Intellectuals
- Endangered, also titled "The Hunted.
- Interceptor

Credited as Production Manager:

- Act of Valor

Credited as Production Assistant or other crew:

- Fright Night Part 2
- Nightflyers
- Remember the Times
- Black or White
- Modern Girls
- Blueberry Hill

Credited as an actor:

- We Were Soldiers
