= Oil Valley Film Festival =

Annual American film festival in Oil City, Pennsylvania

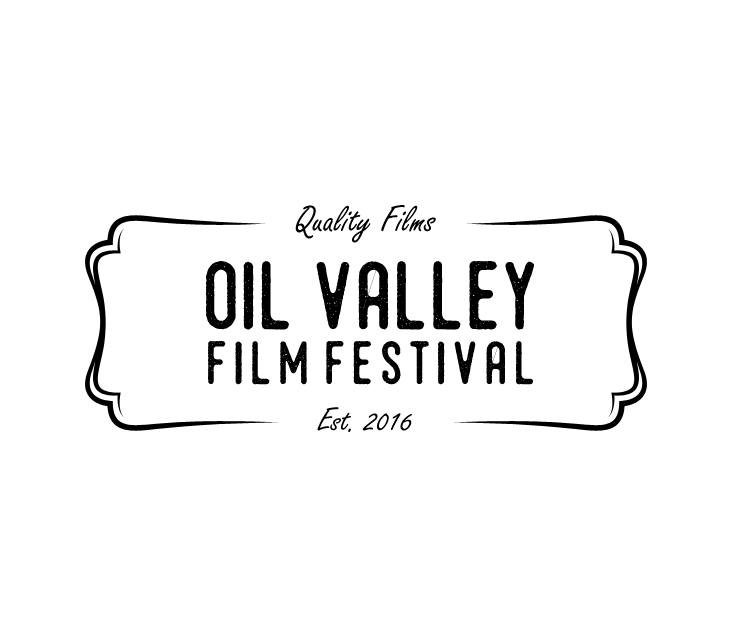
- Location: Oil City, Pennsylvania, United States
- Founded: 2015
- Language: International, with English Subtitles
- Website: oilvalleyfilmfestival.weebly.com

The Oil Valley Film Festival is an annual American film festival in Oil City, Pennsylvania.

The festival takes place at the historic National Transit Building and the Oil City Library. The festival comprises competitive sections for American and international narrative and documentary films, both feature-length films and short films, and a curated block of out-of-competition selections. Audience favorites in feature and short categories, as voted on by the attending audiences, receive prizes separate from jury prizes. The festival also includes a screenwriting competition.

== Festival Programming ==
The Oil Valley Film Festival consists of film programming over a three-day period. Day one provides the juried short film program. Day two provides the juried feature film program, with a social event for filmmakers and audience members to interact. Day three allows the audience members to watch a curated program consisting of films chosen by the festival's director. Beginning in 2017, the festival began with various panels of discussion featuring filmmakers, actors, and producers from the selected films. Topics for each panel vary.

== History ==
The Oil Valley Film Festival was founded by Matt Croyle in 2015, to bring new and established cinema to the underrepresented region of Venango County, Pennsylvania, with the first festival taking place September 1–3, 2016. It is the first international film festival of its kind in Pennsylvania's Oil Region. Croyle stated that his ambition was to bring art house works to an audience who would not normally be able to see non-mainstream films.

The founding of the festival garnered attention from established industry publications and organizations, ultimately resulting in partnerships with Videomaker Magazine and The Writers Store.

In the festival's inaugural year, the feature film Audience Prize was awarded to Vincent Pereira for his 1997 film A Better Place, one of the lesser known View Askew Productions films, produced by Kevin Smith and Scott Mosier. A Better Place screened out of jury competition, in the curated block, but was chosen by the audience as their favorite feature of the festival. Filmmaker Zach Daulton, of Ohio, was awarded the short film Audience Prize for his film 'Mayfield.'

In its first year, the Oil Valley Film Festival received submissions from twelve countries on five continents.

On August 25, 2021, the festival was named one of the Top Ten Virtual Film Festivals for September by Filmocracy, due to the festival's online option for viewers.

The 2022 festival featured more high-profile creatives than previous iterations including Oscar winners Cloris Leachman and Olympia Dukakis, in their final screen roles, along with Louis Gossett Jr., Tatum O’Neal and George Chakiris.

The 2023 festival remained a draw for high-profile creatives. Appearing on screen were Abigail Breslin, Jacqueline Bisset, Tom Arnold, and Mercedes Ruehl, with Breslin co-directing a television pilot titled 'Cannibals'. The in-person festival remained without an online streaming option for the second year despite the draw.

=== Addition of an online screening element ===
The 2020 Oil Valley Film Festival partnered with the streaming service Festivee to bring the selected films to audiences digitally. This decision was made because of the COVID-19 pandemic.

The streaming element stayed in place for the 2021 Oil Valley Film Festival, and festival director Matt Croyle has expressed interest in keeping the festival hybrid to accommodate global viewership.

== Notable Guests and Interviews ==
2020: Writer and director James Merendino of SLC Punk and the multifaceted D.B. Sweeney of Eight Men Out, The Cutting Edge, and Memphis Belle.
2021: Natalie Metzger, producer of Werewolves Within, The Beta Test, and Thunder Road, along with screenwriter Jason Usry.
2022: Suzanne Romero, executive director of The George A. Romero Foundation, along with filmmaker Al White, and editor Michael Foster.
2023: Sarah Booth, Canadian actor.

== Award winners ==
2022 Awards
Award	Film	Individual(s)
Best Picture - Feature, Narrative or Documentary	Beyond the Lake	Dir. Dominic Porcari
Best Picture - Short, Narrative or Documentary	Heavy Petting	Dir. Brendan Prost
Best Director - Feature	Beyond the Lake	Dir. Dominic Porcari
Best Director - Short	House of Brotherly Love	Dir. Max Kane
Best Director - Documentary, Short or Feature	Shepherds of the Earth	Dir. Iiris Harma
Outstanding Achievement in Lead Acting, Feature	Beyond the Lake	David Socolar
Outstanding Achievement in Lead Acting, Short	Return to Sender	Allison Tolman
Outstanding Achievement in Supporting Acting, Feature	Not to Forget	Cloris Leachman
Outstanding Achievement in Supporting Acting, Short	House of Brotherly Love	Brooke Gardner
Special Jury Prize in Acting	Delilah	Rainey Qualley
Special Jury Prize in Voice Acting	It's Always Something	Stephen Fry
Outstanding Cinematography - Feature, Narrative or Documentary	Shepherds of the Earth	Visa Koiso-Kanttila
Outstanding Cinematography - Short, Narrative or Documentary	It's Always Something	Bryan Perido
Best Editing - Feature, Narrative or Documentary	Match Struck	Eric Randolph
Best Editing - Short, Narrative or Documentary	Aping Edwin Porter	Ben Simon
Outstanding Screenwriting - Screenwriting Competition - Feature	Aren't You the Family?	Angelise Milton
Outstanding Screenwriting - Screenwriting Competition - Short	Candybyte	Diana Foronda
Outstanding Screenwriting - Screenwriting Competition - Pilot	Canajoharie	Dean C. Cummings

2021 Awards
Award	Film	Individual(s)
Best Picture - Feature, Narrative or Documentary	Shellfish	Dir. Hunter Hopewell
Best Picture - Short, Narrative or Documentary	A Godless Country	Dir. Jesse Richardson
Best Director - Feature, Narrative or Documentary	The Colour of Spring	Dir. Paul Andrew Kimball
Best Director - Short, Narrative or Documentary	Rent Do	Dir. Gavin Michael Booth
Outstanding Achievement in Lead Acting	Shellfish	Savanah Joeckel
Outstanding Achievement in Lead Acting	Bone Cage	Taylor Olson
Outstanding Achievement in Supporting Acting	A Godless Country	Brent Dunner
Outstanding Achievement in Supporting Acting	Rent Do	Sarah Booth
Outstanding Cinematography - Feature, Narrative or Documentary	My Ture Fairytale	Pablo Diez
Outstanding Cinematography - Short, Narrative or Documentary	Flora	Michal Babinec
Best Editing - Feature, Narrative or Documentary	The Game is Up: Disillusioned Trump Voters Tell Their Stories	Marlis Ernst: Lead Editor
Best Editing - Short, Narrative or Documentary	Congratulations (Mabrook)	Sarah Iseley
Outstanding Screenwriting - Screenwriting Competition - Feature	The Bridge Builder	Michael Greene
Outstanding Screenwriting - Screenwriting Competition - Short	The Boy Who Never Existed	Laura Wagner
Outstanding Screenwriting - Screenwriting Competition - Pilot	The Wolfe-Pointe	Julianna Pitt

2020 Awards
Award	Film	Individual(s)
Best Picture - Feature, Narrative or Documentary	Sockeye Salmon. Red Fish	Dir. Dimitry Shpilenok; Vadislav Grishin
Best Picture - Short, Narrative or Documentary	Sac de Merde	Dir. Greg Chwerchak
Best Director - Feature, Narrative or Documentary	Sockeye Salmon. Red Fish	Dir. Dimitry Shpilenok; Vadislav Grishin
Best Director - Short, Narrative or Documentary	Anna	Dir. Dekel Berenson
Outstanding Achievement in Lead Acting	Salting the Fly	Rory James Leech
Outstanding Achievement in Lead Acting	Sac de Merde	Arielle Haller-Silverstone
Outstanding Achievement in Supporting Acting	Ghost in the Gun	Haley Camille
Outstanding Achievement in Supporting Acting	Buffalo & Trout	Brooke Coleman
Outstanding Cinematography - Feature, Narrative or Documentary	Sockeye Salmon. Red Fish	Dimitry Shpilenok; Nikolay Shpilenok
Outstanding Cinematography - Short, Narrative or Documentary	We Hear Running	Jordan Lavery
Best Editing - Feature, Narrative or Documentary	Sockeye Salmon. Red Fish	Anna Sukhova
Best Editing - Short, Narrative or Documentary	Choker	Sunghwan Morgan Francis
Outstanding Screenwriting - Screenwriting Competition - Feature	Modern Art	Laurence Fuller
Outstanding Screenwriting - Screenwriting Competition - Short	Paddy's Tonsorial Emporium	Ronald C. Milburn
Outstanding Screenwriting - Screenwriting Competition - Pilot	Hometown	Adam Dietz

2019 Awards
Award	Film	Individual(s)
Best Picture - Narrative Feature	This World Won't Break	Dir. Josh David Jordan
Best Picture - Documentary Feature	Making Coco: The Grant Fuhr Story	Dir. Don Metz
Best Picture - Narrative Short	Ways to Look at the Moon	Dir. Katherine Clark
Best Picture - Documentary Short	Outspoken	Dir. Emily Harger
Best Director - Feature	A Black Letter Day	Dir. Ekaterina Tarasova
Best Director - Short	Scrap	Dir. Leena Pendharker
Best Actor - Feature	Last Call	Sarah Booth
Best Actor - Short	Still Young	Adrian Ross-Jones
Best Supporting Actor - Feature	This World Won't Break	Roxanna Redfoot
Best Supporting Actor - Short	A Black Letter Day	Igor Shugaleev
Outstanding Cinematography - Feature	Last Call	Seth Wessel-Estes
Outstanding Cinematography - Short	Minor Key	Jose Martin Rosete
Best Editing - Feature	The Astronot	Tim Cash
Best Editing - Short	Scrap	Sunghwan Moon
Audience Choice Award for Best Picture - Feature	Last Call	Dir. Gavin Michael Booth
Outstanding Screenwriting - Screenwriting Competition - Feature	Think Forward	David Keogh
Outstanding Screenwriting - Screenwriting Competition - Short	Homefulness	Dan LaTourette
Outstanding Screenwriting - Screenwriting Competition - Pilot	Almost	Elena Lockleis

2018 Awards
Award	Film	Individual(s)
Best Picture - Narrative Feature	Blue	Dir. Gabriela Ledesma
Best Picture - Documentary Feature	You Racist, Sexist, Bigot	Dir. Pita Juarez; Matty Steinkamp
Best Picture - Narrative Short	Domesticated	Dir. Juan Francisco Viruega
Best Picture - Documentary Short	One Year on a Bike	Dir. Martijn Doolaard
Best Director - Narrative Feature	Blue	Dir. Gabriela Ledesma
Best Director - Documentary Feature	You Racist, Sexist, Bigot	Dir. Pita Juarez; Matty Steinkamp
Best Director - Narrative Short	Snow	Dir. Alex Murawski
Best Director - Documentary Short	Nobody Dies Here	Dir. Simon Panay
Best Actor - Feature	Blue	Callie Schuttera
Best Actor - Short	Ainhoa	Aurelia Schikarski
Best Supporting Actor - Feature	After Hours Trading	Ariana Livingston
Best Supporting Actor - Short	Spoken Word	Lance Reddick
Outstanding Cinematography - Narrative Feature	Regionrat	Carlos Jimenez
Outstanding Cinematography - Documentary Feature	Flin Flon: A Hockey Town	Soren Neilsen; Christine Ng
Outstanding Cinematography - Narrative Short	88 Cents	Matthew Petrunak
Outstanding Cinematography - Documentary Short	One Year on a Bike	Martijn Doolaard
Best Editing - Narrative Feature	The Song of Sway Lake	Todd Holmes; Gabriel Wrye
Best Editing - Documentary Feature	Poured in Pennsylvania	Doug Metz
Best Editing - Narrative Short	Guard	Brian Philip Davis
Best Editing - Documentary Short	Nobody Dies Here	Simon Panay
Audience Choice Award for Best Picture - Feature	Blue	Dir. Gabriela Ledesma
Audience Choice Award for Best Picture - Short	Domesticated	Dir. Juan Francisco Viruega
Outstanding Screenwriting - Screenwriting Competition - Feature	Blind-Sighted	David Keogh
Outstanding Screenwriting - Screenwriting Competition - Short	Cherry Glazed	Christine Sherwood
Outstanding Screenwriting - Screenwriting Competition - Pilot	Peace, Love & Law Enforcement	Lorraine Portman

2017 Awards
Award	Film	Individual(s)
Best Picture - Narrative Feature	Blockbuster - A Life in Moving Pictures	Dir. Vlado Priborsky
Best Picture - Documentary Feature	Passfire	Dir. Jesse Veverka
Best Picture - Narrative Short	The Eliminadora	Dir. PJ Gaynard
Best Picture - Documentary Short	1,000	Dir. Abdullah Washington; Tom Weber
Best Director - Feature	Meadow Bridge	Dir. Tijah Bumgarner
Best Director - Short	The Bouquet	Dir. Julien Segard; Roman Carciofo
Best Actor - Feature	Meadow Bridge	Micah Gilkerson
Best Actor - Short	The Bouquet	David Brenot
Best Supporting Actor - Feature	Meadow Bridge	Kate Morris
Best Supporting Actor - Short	Derelict	William Waddell
Outstanding Cinematography - Feature	Blockbuster - A Life in Moving Pictures	Costa Konstantinou; Edgar Pfandler; Daniel Steiner
Outstanding Cinematography - Short	Derelict	Hank Vohrer
Best Editing - Feature	Meadow Bridge	Manuel Aranda; Jose Arriaga; Juan Fernandez; Nerea Muguerza
Best Editing - Short	The Bouquet	Jérémy Pitard
Audience Choice Award for Best Picture - Feature	Meadow Bridge	Dir. Tijah Bumgarner
Audience Choice Award for Best Picture - Short	The Bouquet	Dir. Julien Segard; Roman Carciofo
Outstanding Screenwriting - Screenwriting Competition - Feature	Day of Reckoning	Lorraine Portman
Outstanding Screenwriting - Screenwriting Competition - Short	Brier Hill	Jonathan Stiffy
Outstanding Screenwriting - Screenwriting Competition - Pilot	Adrift	Michael Snow

2016 Awards
Award	Film	Individual(s)
Best Picture - Feature	Figurine	Dir. Hans Olson
Best Picture - Short	Mayfield	Dir. Zach Daulton
Best Director - Feature	Figurine	Dir. Hans Olson
Best Director - Short	Lighthouse Keeper	Dir. Nadia Shmeleva
Best Actor - Feature	Figurine	Kelly Goetz
Best Actor - Short	Mayfield	John Adrian Riley
Best Supporting Actor - Feature	Exit Thread	Hilary Connell
Best Supporting Actor - Short	A Box Came To Brooklyn	Jack Haley
Outstanding Cinematography - Feature	Figurine	Mike McLaughlin
Outstanding Cinematography - Short	Thornbird	Anthony Watkins
Best Editing - Feature	Escapes	Manuel Aranda; Jose Arriaga; Juan Fernandez; Nerea Muguerza
Best Editing - Short	Vessel	B.A. Lewandowski
Audience Choice Award for Best Picture - Feature	A Better Place	Dir. Vincent Pereira
Audience Choice Award for Best Picture - Short	Mayfield	Dir. Zach Daulton
Outstanding Screenwriting - Screenwriting Competition - Feature	Arvin Lindemeyer Takes Canarsie	D. Ferrara
Outstanding Screenwriting - Screenwriting Competition - Short	Deadhorse Lick	Charles Hall
