= MTV Movie Award for Best Kiss =

Film award

The following list is for the MTV Movie Award winners and nominees for Best Kiss. Kristen Stewart & Robert Pattinson won for The Twilight Saga films (along with "Best Movie") in four consecutive years (2009–2012).

== Winners and nominees ==
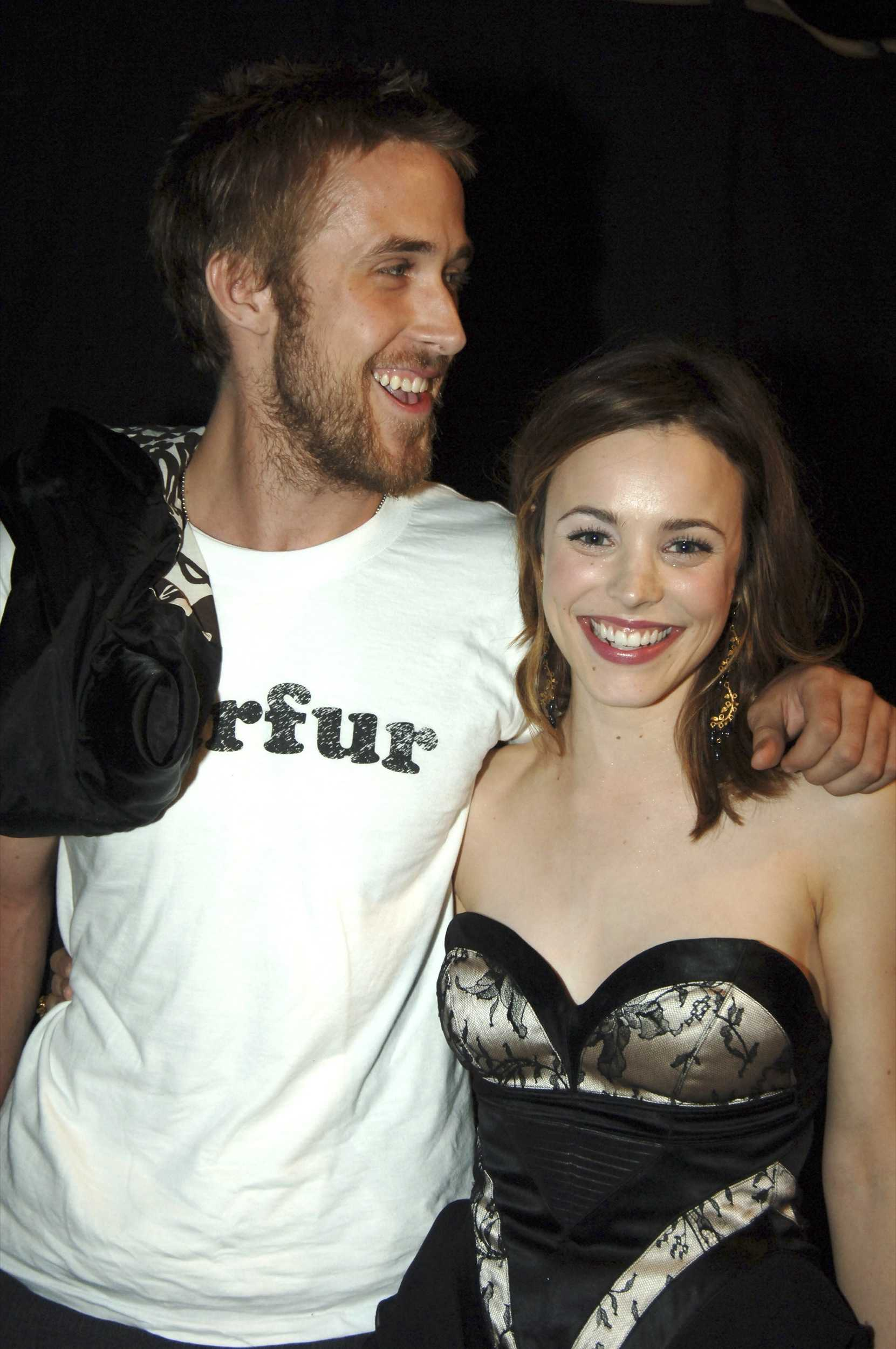
2005 winners Ryan Gosling and Rachel McAdams on their kiss in The Notebook

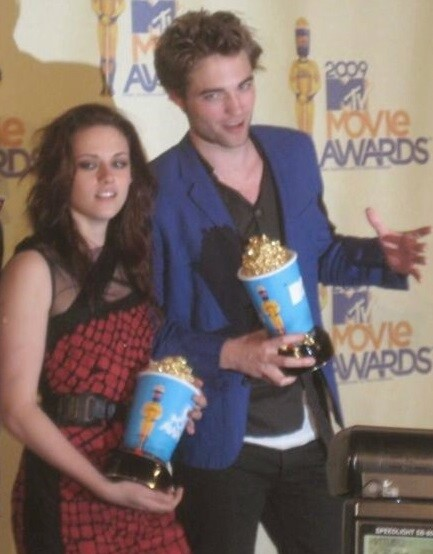
2009, 2010, 2011 and 2012 winners Robert Pattinson and Kristen Stewart on their kisses in The Twilight Saga franchise

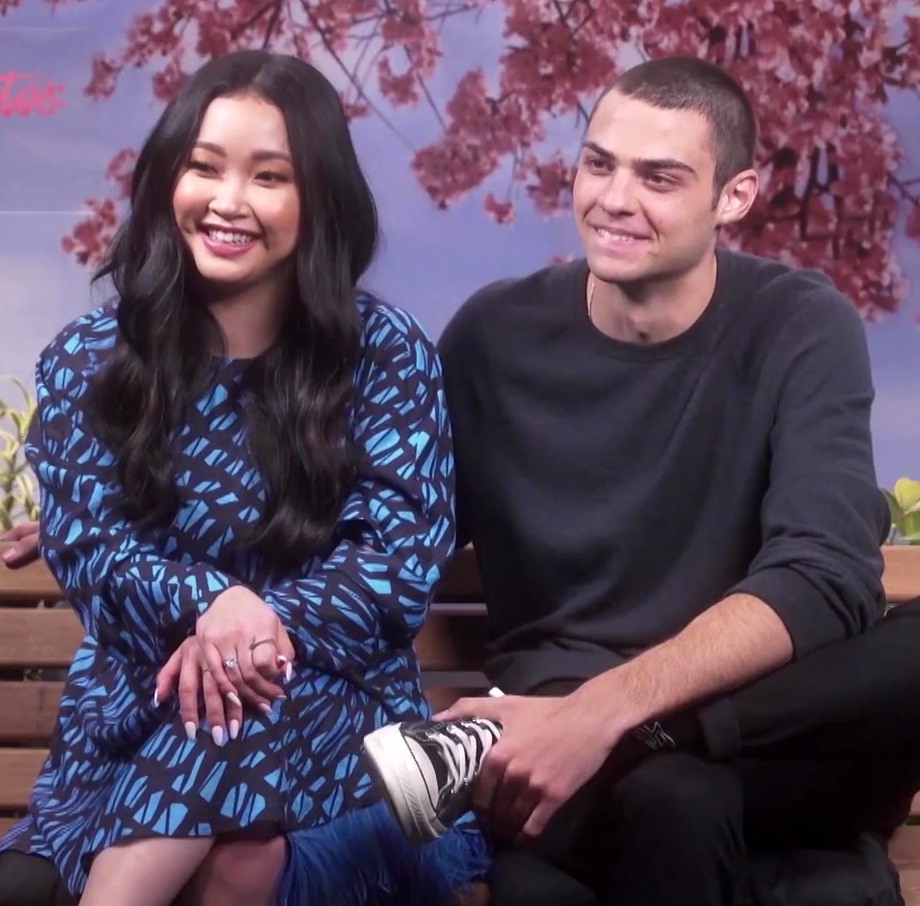
2019 winners Noah Centineo and Lana Condor on their kiss in To All the Boys I’ve Loved Before

Year	Winners	Nominees	Ref.
1992	Anna Chlumsky & Macaulay Culkin – My Girl	Anjelica Huston & Raúl Juliá – The Addams Family; Annette Bening & Warren Beatty – Bugsy; Juliette Lewis & Robert De Niro – Cape Fear; Priscilla Presley & Leslie Nielsen – The Naked Gun 2½: The Smell of Fear	
1993	Christian Slater & Marisa Tomei – Untamed Heart	Pauline Brailsford & Tom Hanks – A League of Their Own; Michelle Pfeiffer & Michael Keaton – Batman Returns; Winona Ryder & Gary Oldman – Bram Stoker's Dracula; Mel Gibson & Rene Russo – Lethal Weapon 3 Woody Harrelson & Rosie Perez – White Men Can't Jump	
1994	Demi Moore & Woody Harrelson – Indecent Proposal	Patricia Arquette & Christian Slater – True Romance; Kim Basinger & Dana Carvey – Wayne's World 2 Jason James Richter & Willy – Free Willy; Winona Ryder & Ethan Hawke – Reality Bites	
1995	Jim Carrey & Lauren Holly – Dumb and Dumber	Julie Delpy & Ethan Hawke – Before Sunrise; Juliette Lewis & Woody Harrelson – Natural Born Killers; Sandra Bullock & Keanu Reeves – Speed; Jamie Lee Curtis & Arnold Schwarzenegger – True Lies	
1996	Natasha Henstridge & Anthony Guidera – Species	Antonio Banderas & Salma Hayek – Desperado; Jim Carrey & Sophie Okonedo – Ace Ventura: When Nature Calls; Winona Ryder & Dermot Mulroney – How to Make an American Quilt; Aitana Sánchez-Gijón & Keanu Reeves – A Walk in the Clouds	
1997	Will Smith & Vivica A. Fox – Independence Day	Claire Danes & Leonardo DiCaprio – Romeo + Juliet; Gina Gershon & Jennifer Tilly – Bound; Kyra Sedgwick & John Travolta – Phenomenon; Christine Taylor & Christopher Daniel Barnes – A Very Brady Sequel	
1998	Adam Sandler & Drew Barrymore – The Wedding Singer	Joey Lauren Adams & Carmen Llywelyn – Chasing Amy; Matt Damon & Minnie Driver – Good Will Hunting; Leonardo DiCaprio & Kate Winslet – Titanic; Kevin Kline & Tom Selleck – In & Out	
1999	Gwyneth Paltrow & Joseph Fiennes – Shakespeare in Love	George Clooney & Jennifer Lopez – Out of Sight; Matt Dillon, Denise Richards & Neve Campbell – Wild Things; Jeremy Irons & Dominique Swain – Lolita; Ben Stiller & Cameron Diaz – There's Something About Mary	
2000	Sarah Michelle Gellar & Selma Blair – Cruel Intentions	Drew Barrymore & Michael Vartan – Never Been Kissed; Katie Holmes & Barry Watson – Teaching Mrs. Tingle; Hilary Swank & Chloë Sevigny – Boys Don't Cry	
2001	Julia Stiles & Sean Patrick Thomas – Save the Last Dance	Jon Abrahams & Anna Faris – Scary Movie; Ben Affleck & Gwyneth Paltrow – Bounce; Tom Hanks & Helen Hunt – Cast Away; Anthony Hopkins & Julianne Moore – Hannibal	
2002	Jason Biggs & Seann William Scott – American Pie 2	Nicole Kidman & Ewan McGregor – Moulin Rouge! Mia Kirshner & Beverly Polcyn – Not Another Teen Movie; Heath Ledger & Shannyn Sossamon – A Knight's Tale; Renée Zellweger & Colin Firth – Bridget Jones's Diary	
2003	Tobey Maguire & Kirsten Dunst – Spider-Man	Ben Affleck & Jennifer Garner – Daredevil; Nick Cannon & Zoe Saldaña – Drumline Leonardo DiCaprio & Cameron Diaz – Gangs of New York; Adam Sandler & Emily Watson – Punch-Drunk Love	
2004	Owen Wilson, Carmen Electra & Amy Smart – Starsky & Hutch	Charlize Theron & Christina Ricci – Monster; Keanu Reeves & Monica Bellucci – The Matrix Reloaded; Jim Carrey & Jennifer Aniston – Bruce Almighty; Shawn Ashmore & Anna Paquin – X2	
2005	Ryan Gosling & Rachel McAdams – The Notebook	Natalie Portman & Zach Braff – Garden State; Gwyneth Paltrow & Jude Law – Sky Captain and the World of Tomorrow; Jennifer Garner & Natassia Malthe – Elektra; Elisha Cuthbert & Emile Hirsch – The Girl Next Door	
2006	Jake Gyllenhaal & Heath Ledger – Brokeback Mountain	Taraji P. Henson & Terrence Howard – Hustle & Flow; Anna Faris & Chris Marquette – Just Friends; Angelina Jolie & Brad Pitt – Mr. & Mrs. Smith; Rosario Dawson & Clive Owen – Sin City	
2007	Will Ferrell & Sacha B. Cohen – Talladega Nights: The Ballad of Ricky Bobby	Cameron Diaz & Jude Law – The Holiday; Columbus Short & Meagan Good – Stomp the Yard; Mark Wahlberg & Elizabeth Banks – Invincible; Marlon Wayans & Brittany Daniel – Little Man	
2008	Briana Evigan & Robert Hoffman – Step Up 2: The Streets	Amy Adams & Patrick Dempsey – Enchanted; Shia LaBeouf & Sarah Roemer – Disturbia; Elliot Page (Note: Credited as Ellen Page) & Michael Cera – Juno; Daniel Radcliffe & Katie Leung – Harry Potter and the Order of the Phoenix	
2009	Kristen Stewart & Robert Pattinson – Twilight	Angelina Jolie & James McAvoy – Wanted; Freida Pinto & Dev Patel – Slumdog Millionaire; James Franco & Sean Penn – Milk; Paul Rudd & Thomas Lennon – I Love You, Man; Vanessa Hudgens & Zac Efron – High School Musical 3: Senior Year	
2010	Kristen Stewart & Robert Pattinson – The Twilight Saga: New Moon	Kristen Stewart & Dakota Fanning – The Runaways; Sandra Bullock & Ryan Reynolds – The Proposal; Taylor Swift & Taylor Lautner – Valentine's Day; Zoe Saldaña & Sam Worthington – Avatar	
2011	Kristen Stewart & Robert Pattinson – The Twilight Saga: Eclipse	Elliot Page & Joseph Gordon-Levitt – Inception; Emma Watson & Daniel Radcliffe – Harry Potter and the Deathly Hallows – Part 1 Kristen Stewart & Taylor Lautner – The Twilight Saga: Eclipse; Natalie Portman & Mila Kunis – Black Swan	
2012	Kristen Stewart & Robert Pattinson – The Twilight Saga: Breaking Dawn – Part 1	Ryan Gosling & Emma Stone – Crazy, Stupid, Love; Emma Watson & Rupert Grint – Harry Potter and the Deathly Hallows – Part 2 Jennifer Lawrence & Josh Hutcherson – The Hunger Games; Channing Tatum & Rachel McAdams – The Vow	
2013	Jennifer Lawrence & Bradley Cooper – Silver Linings Playbook	Emma Watson & Logan Lerman – The Perks of Being a Wallflower; Kara Hayward & Jared Gilman – Moonrise Kingdom; Kerry Washington & Jamie Foxx – Django Unchained; Mila Kunis & Mark Wahlberg – Ted	
2014	Emma Roberts, Jennifer Aniston & Will Poulter – We're the Millers	Ashley Benson, James Franco & Vanessa Hudgens – Spring Breakers; Jennifer Lawrence & Amy Adams – American Hustle; Joseph Gordon-Levitt & Scarlett Johansson – Don Jon; Shailene Woodley & Miles Teller – The Spectacular Now	
2015	Shailene Woodley & Ansel Elgort – The Fault in Our Stars	Emma Stone & Andrew Garfield – The Amazing Spider-Man 2 James Franco & Seth Rogen – The Interview; Rose Byrne & Halston Sage – Neighbors; Scarlett Johansson & Chris Evans – Captain America: The Winter Soldier	
2016	Rebel Wilson & Adam Devine – Pitch Perfect 2	Amy Schumer & Bill Hader – Trainwreck; Dakota Johnson & Jamie Dornan – Fifty Shades of Grey; Leslie Mann & Chris Hemsworth – Vacation; Margot Robbie & Will Smith – Focus; Morena Baccarin & Ryan Reynolds – Deadpool	
2017	Ashton Sanders & Jharrel Jerome – Moonlight	Emma Stone & Ryan Gosling – La La Land; Emma Watson & Dan Stevens – Beauty and the Beast; Taraji P. Henson & Terrence Howard – Empire; Zac Efron & Anna Kendrick – Mike and Dave Need Wedding Dates	
2018	Nick Robinson & Keiynan Lonsdale – Love, Simon	Gina Rodriguez & Justin Baldoni – Jane the Virgin; Olivia Cooke & Tye Sheridan – Ready Player One; KJ Apa & Camila Mendes – Riverdale; Finn Wolfhard & Millie Bobby Brown – Stranger Things	
2019	Noah Centineo & Lana Condor – To All the Boys I've Loved Before	Jason Momoa & Amber Heard – Aquaman; Charles Melton & Camila Mendes – Riverdale; Ncuti Gatwa & Connor Swindells – Sex Education; Tom Hardy & Michelle Williams – Venom	
2021	Chase Stokes & Madelyn Cline – Outer Banks	Jodie Comer & Sandra Oh – Killing Eve; Lily Collins & Lucas Bravo – Emily in Paris; Maitreyi Ramakrishnan & Jaren Lewison – Never Have I Ever; Regé-Jean Page & Phoebe Dynevor – Bridgerton	
2022	Sean "Poopies" McInerney and the snake – Jackass Forever	Hunter Schafer & Dominic Fike – Euphoria; Lily Collins & Lucien Laviscount – Emily in Paris; Robert Pattinson & Zoë Kravitz – The Batman; Tom Holland & Zendaya – Spider-Man: No Way Home	
2023	Madison Bailey & Rudy Pankow – Outer Banks	Anna Torv & Philip Prajoux – The Last of Us; Harry Styles & David Dawson – My Policeman; Riley Keough & Sam Claflin – Daisy Jones & the Six; Selena Gomez & Cara Delevingne – Only Murders in the Building	

== Awards breakdown ==
=== Most wins ===
- Robert Pattinson — 4
- Kristen Stewart — 4

=== Most nominations ===
- Kristen Stewart — 6
- Robert Pattinson — 5
- Emma Watson — 4
- Cameron Diaz — 3
- Leonardo DiCaprio — 3
- James Franco — 3
- Ryan Gosling — 3
- Woody Harrelson — 3
- Jennifer Lawrence — 3
- Gwyneth Paltrow — 3
- Keanu Reeves — 3
- Winona Ryder — 3
- Emma Stone — 3
- Amy Adams — 2
- Ben Affleck — 2
- Jennifer Aniston — 2
- Drew Barrymore — 2
- Sandra Bullock — 2
- Jim Carrey — 2
- Lily Collins — 2
- Zac Efron — 2
- Anna Faris — 2
- Jennifer Garner — 2
- Joseph Gordon-Levitt — 2
- Tom Hanks — 2
- Ethan Hawke — 2
- Taraji P. Henson — 2
- Terrence Howard — 2
- Vanessa Hudgens — 2
- Scarlett Johansson — 2
- Angelina Jolie — 2
- Mila Kunis — 2
- Taylor Lautner — 2
- Jude Law — 2
- Heath Ledger — 2
- Juliette Lewis — 2
- Rachel McAdams — 2
- Elliot Page — 2
- Natalie Portman — 2
- Daniel Radcliffe — 2
- Ryan Reynolds — 2
- Zoe Saldaña — 2
- Adam Sandler — 2
- Christian Slater — 2
- Will Smith — 2
- Mark Wahlberg — 2
- Shailene Woodley — 2
