= Rip It Off (Stroke 9 album) =

Studio album by Stroke 9
- Released: October 1, 2002
- Genre: Alternative rock
- Label: Universal
- Producers: Stroke 9; Jerry Harrison; David Kahne; John Shanks; Butch Walker

Stroke 9 chronology
Nasty Little Thoughts (1999)	Rip It Off (2002)	All In (2004)

Professional ratings
Review scores
Source	Rating
AllMusic	2.5/5 stars
Spin	5/10

Rip It Off is the fourth studio album from San Francisco, California, United States, alternative rock band Stroke 9. It was released on October 1, 2002. The album's singles were "Latest Disaster", "Kick Some Ass", and "100 Girls". "Kick Some Ass" appeared in the 2001 film Jay and Silent Bob Strike Back, and the music video for the song features the title characters Jay and Silent Bob attacking random fictional singers and rappers. The song "Just Can't Wait" was also included on the album "Chelsea Mix" which was released to promote the My Scene dolls. "Do It Again" was featured in season three, episode three of the American TV show Scrubs.

== Track listing ==
1. "Latest Disaster"
2. "100 Girls"
3. "Vacuum Bag"
4. "Kick Some Ass"
5. "Don't Worry"
6. "Do It Again"
7. "Just Can't Wait"
8. "We Were Wrong"
9. "Reject"
10. "Anywhere"
11. "Lead The Way"
12. "California"
