= Carmen Llywelyn =

American actor and photographer

- Born: Atlanta, Georgia, U.S.
- Occupations: Actress, photographer
- Spouse: Jason Lee (m. 1995; div. 2001)
- Children: 2

Carmen Llywelyn, also known as Carmen Lee, is an American actress and photographer.

== Career ==
She starred in the 1996 film Drawing Flies, a View Askew production directed by Matthew Gissing and Malcolm Ingram, and produced by Kevin Smith. She portrayed Kim in the 1997 film Chasing Amy directed by Kevin Smith; co-stars included Jason Lee, Ben Affleck, and Joey Lauren Adams. She appeared in the 2000 film Cowboys and Angels alongside actors Radha Mitchell and Mia Kirshner. She was the lead actress in Free (2001), opposite Corin Nemec, also starring Randall Batinkoff and Ione Skye.

== Personal life ==
In 1994, Llywelyn met Jason Lee, then a professional skateboarder. In 1995, the couple were married in a ceremony presided over by actor Bodhi Elfman. In March 2001, the couple lived together in Southern California. Llywelyn and Lee obtained a divorce in 2001. Lee stated of their separation, "Our breakup had nothing to do with Hollywood or my career."

Llywelyn entered a long-term relationship, with someone other than Lee, in 2003 and the couple became parents of twins in 2004. As of 2015, the family lived together in Atlanta.

== Relationship with the Church of Scientology ==
Llywelyn was introduced to the Church of Scientology by her then-husband Jason Lee. According to Llywelyn, her resistance to becoming more involved with Scientology was a cause of problems in their relationship.

According to her account, after she revealed to her Scientologist talent manager Gay Ribisi (mother of actor Giovanni Ribisi) that she had read A Piece of Blue Sky, a book critical of the Church, she was labeled a suppressive person and shunned (or "disconnected") by her friends within the church. Her husband sent a "disconnection letter" as a sign of contempt two days after said conversation; he would ironically drop out of his involvement with Scientology in 2016. Llywelyn's manager, a member of the Church, also "disconnected" and allegedly convinced United Talent Agency to drop Llywelyn as a client.

Since her departure, Llywelyn has been an outspoken critic of the Church of Scientology. She has expressed distaste for the classist undertones of Scientology.

She has stated the organization has harassed her, pursuant to the fair game policy. Llywelyn reports being subjected to a campaign of surveillance and harassment. Writes Llywelyn: "Scientology has a sophisticated intelligence agency known as the Office of Special Affairs, which is essentially a complex system dedicated to ruining the lives of those it sees as enemies in any way possible. Those who work for the OSA do not follow the law."

== Filmography ==
Year	Film	Role	Director
1996	Drawing Flies	Cassidy	Matthew Gissing, Malcolm Ingram
1997	Chasing Amy	Kim	Kevin Smith
1997	A Better Place	Augustine	Vincent Pereira
1999	The Mod Squad	Alley Prostitute	Scott Silver
1999	Never Been Kissed	Rob's Girlfriend	Raja Gosnell
2000	Cowboys and Angels	Dana	Gregory C. Haynes
2001	Free (Film)	Laura	Andrew Avery
2001	Jay and Silent Bob Strike Back	Redhead Beauty	Kevin Smith

== Awards and nominations ==
Year	Award	Category	Work	Result
1998	MTV Movie Awards	Best Kiss (shared with Joey Lauren Adams)	Chasing Amy	Nominated
