= Little Black Backpack =

1999 single by Stroke 9

Single by Stroke 9

from the album Nasty Little Thoughts
- Released: 1999
- Studio: The Plant (Sausalito)
- Genre: Alternative rock; power pop; pop rock
- Length: 3:43
- Label: Universal
- Songwriter(s): Stroke 9
- Producer(s): Jerry Harrison

Stroke 9 singles chronology
"Little Black Backpack" (1999)	"Letters" (2000)

Music video
- "Little Black Backpack" on YouTube

"Little Black Backpack" is a song by American rock band Stroke 9 from their third studio album Nasty Little Thoughts (1999). It was released to radio as the lead single from the album in 1999, by Universal. The song was collectively written by Stroke 9 and produced by Jerry Harrison. The song was inspired by a women's fashion trend in the late-Nineties. Commercially, "Little Black Backpack" achieved moderate success in the United States and reached the top 20 in New Zealand.

== Writing and inspiration ==
"Little Black Backpack" was collectively written by Stroke 9. According to frontman Luke Esterkyn, the song was inspired by a late-Nineties fashion trend among women. He stated: "[The band] would go out and notice all these little black backpack purse things. Everyone had them. All these seemingly intelligent and cool girls bought into the trend." The song's message of jealousy was inspired by Esterkyn's ex-girlfriend, as he witnessed her wearing a black backpack while out with another man.

== Chart performance and critical reception ==
"Little Black Backpack" achieved moderate success in the United States. The song peaked at number four on the Bubbling Under Hot 100 chart, in which it spent fourteen weeks on the chart.

Heather Phares of AllMusic referred to the song as college rock, in which she praised the radio-friendly nature of it.

== Live performances ==
Stroke 9 performed the song at the 2000 California Music Awards.

== Track listings and formats ==
- CD single
1. "Little Black Backpack" – 3:43
2. "Down" – 4:23
3. "One Time" – 3:20
4. "Tear Me in Two" – 5:12
5. "Little Black Backpack" (live) – 3:43

== Credits and personnel ==
Credits and personnel are adapted from the Nasty Little Thoughts album liner notes.

- Luke Esterkyn – vocals, guitar
- Eric Stock – drums, percussion
- John McDermott – guitar, background vocals
- Greg Gueldner – bass
- Jerry Harrison – producer
- Karl Derfler – recording
- Leff Lefferts – recording assistant
- Tom Lord-Alge – mixing
- Ted Jensen – mastering

== Charts ==
Chart (1999)	Peak position
New Zealand (Recorded Music NZ)	16
US Bubbling Under Hot 100 Singles (Billboard)	4
US Alternative Airplay (Billboard)	6
US Pop Airplay (Billboard)	39
