= Drawing Flies =

- Poster
- Directed by: Malcolm Ingram; Matt Gissing
- Written by: Malcolm Ingram; Matt Gissing
- Produced by: Malcolm Ingram; Matt Gissing; Scott Mosier; Kevin Smith
- Starring: Jason Lee; Jason Mewes; Renee Humphrey; Carmen Lee
- Cinematography: Brian Pearson
- Edited by: Malcolm Ingram; Matt Gissing
- Distributed by: View Askew Productions
- Release date: November 24, 1996
- Running time: 76 minutes
- Country: Canada
- Language: English
- Budget: $40,000

Drawing Flies is a 1996 comedy film from Kevin Smith's View Askew Productions. It was written, directed, and edited by filmmakers Malcolm Ingram and Matt Gissing, with financial backing from Smith and Scott Mosier. This was Jason Lee's first leading role. The movie gets its namesake from a song by the American grunge band Soundgarden.

== Synopsis ==
After they get cut off welfare, Donner (Jason Lee) leads four of his jobless, penniless roommates to spend their last remaining money on a cover charge for a party and get high. After getting evicted, they all embark on a journey to find a cabin in the woods that belongs to his uncle. When their van breaks down, they get lost and stranded in the woods, without food, water or their bearings. He eventually reveals to his roommates that the search for the cabin is really a search for Sasquatch. They, of course, think he's crazy. There is conflict. Donner insists he is onto something, but the others just write him off. But to make matters worse, they uncover all kinds of bizarre and dangerous activity as they wander through the woods in search of not only Bigfoot himself but any hope of a future. Eventually, Donner does find Bigfoot and has a campfire with him and the others).

== Cast ==
Actor	Role
Jason Lee	Donner
Jason Mewes	Az
Renee Humphrey	Meg
Carmen Lee	Cassidy
Martin Brooks	Jake
Scott Mosier	Diaperman
Kevin Smith (Credited as Silent Bob)	John
Ethan Suplee (Credited as Willam Black)	Ethan
Joey Lauren Adams	Hippy Chick

== Production notes ==
While making Mallrats, Kevin Smith met Canadian Film Threat journalist Malcolm Ingram and his friend Matt Gissing; the three decided to make Drawing Flies, the title of which is based on a Soundgarden song from the album Badmotorfinger. Along with much of the cast of Mallrats, Smith headed up to the Canadian wilderness and made the film. The same camera and type of film stock that was used to film Clerks was used to film Drawing Flies. The film was only featured at a few film festivals before it was given a DVD release in 2002. Kevin Smith wears his "Silent Bob" outfit from Mallrats and is credited as "Silent Bob", although the character is referred to as "John". He never utters a line.

Previous to this film, Jason Lee had only acted in Mallrats. He later said of Drawing Flies: "nobody’s seen that film, really, but that film really marked a turning point for me in that I thought, Okay, regardless of what happens with this movie, this is the second movie for me. If I can pull this off, then I'll be an actor."

== Home media ==
The film was released on DVD on February 26, 2002.
