= Nasty Little Thoughts =

Studio album by Stroke 9
- Released: September 7, 1999
- Studio: The Plant (Sausalito); Royaltone (North Hollywood)
- Genre: Alternative rock
- Length: 47:52
- Label: Universal
- Producer: Jerry Harrison; Rupert Hine

Stroke 9 chronology
Bumper to Bumper (1995)	Nasty Little Thoughts (1999)	Rip It Off (2002)

Singles from Nasty Little Thoughts
- 1. "Little Black Backpack" Released: August 3, 1999; 2. "Letters" Released: March 28, 2000; 3. "Washin' + Wonderin'" Released: 2000

Nasty Little Thoughts is the third studio album by the American rock band Stroke 9. Universal Records released the album on September 7, 1999. It was written by Stroke 9 and produced by Jerry Harrison and Rupert Hine. It received a mixed reception from musicians critics.

It was certified Gold by the RIAA on April 21, 2000 and yielded 2 singles: "Little Black Backpack" and "Letters", which charted the Billboard Modern Rock Tracks. The album charted the Top Heatseekers chart.

== Critical reception ==
Professional ratings
Review scores
Source	Rating
AllMusic	3/5 stars
Courier News	2.5/4 stars
Edmonton Journal	2/4 stars

The San Francisco Examiner wrote that the album "is chockablock with hooks the size of battleship anchors, as well as enough meaty guitar and excellent singing—plus a nice blend of boyish introspection and lighthearted humor—to keep Stroke 9 on the radio for the next eon."

== Track listing ==
Nasty Little Thoughts track listing
No.	Title	Length
1.	"Letters"	3:59
2.	"City Life"	3:57
3.	"Little Black Backpack"	3:43
4.	"Tail of the Sun"	4:03
5.	"Washin' + Wonderin'"	4:04
6.	"Make It Last"	3:58
7.	"Are You in This?"	3:18
8.	"Not Nothin'"	3:30
9.	"One Time"	3:20
10.	"Down"	4:23
11.	"Angels"	4:25
12.	"Tear Me in Two"	5:12
Total length:		47:52

=== Notes ===
- All tracks are written by Stroke 9.
- Tracks 1, 2, 3, 5, 6, 8, and 12 are produced by Jerry Harrison and tracks 4, 7, 9, 10, and 11 are produced by Rupert Hine.

== Personnel ==
Credits are adapted from the liner notes of Nasty Little Thoughts.

Musicians

- Luke Esterkyn – vocals, guitar
- Eric Stock – drums, percussion
- John McDermott – guitar, background vocals, additional piano, organ
- Greg Gueldner – bass
- Jerry Harrison – additional guitar, piano
- Rupert Hine – additional piano, keyboards

Technical

- Jerry Harrison – producer (1, 2, 3, 5, 6, 8, 12)
- Karl Derfler – recording (1, 2, 3, 5, 6, 8, 12), mixing (5, 6)
- Leff Lefferts – recording assistant (1, 2, 3, 5, 6, 8, 12)
- Tom Lord-Alge – mixing (1, 2, 3, 8, 12)
- Rupert Hine – producer (4, 7, 9, 10, 11)
- Ruadhri Cushnan – recording (4, 7, 9, 10, 11)
- Curt Kroeger – recording assistant (4, 7, 9, 10, 11)
- Chris Morrison – recording assistant (4, 7, 9, 10, 11)
- Chris Lord-Alge – mixing (4, 7, 9, 10, 11)
- Dan Chase – additional recording
- Neal Avron – additional recording
- Ted Jensen – mastering

== Charts ==
Weekly chart performance for Nasty Little Thoughts
Chart (1999)	Peak position
US Billboard 200	83
