= A Cool, Dry Place =

- Film poster
- Directed by: John N. Smith
- Written by: Matthew McDuffie
- Based on: Dance Real Slow by Michael Grant Jaffe
- Produced by: Katie Jacobs; Gail Mutrux
- Starring: Vince Vaughn; Monica Potter; Joey Lauren Adams
- Cinematography: Jean Lépine
- Edited by: Susan Shipton
- Music by: Curt Sobel
- Production company: Fox 2000 Pictures
- Distributed by: 20th Century Fox
- Release date: November 6, 1998
- Running time: 97 minutes
- Country: United States
- Language: English
- Box office: $4,390

A Cool, Dry Place is a 1998 American drama film directed by John N. Smith and written by Matthew McDuffie, based on the 1996 novel Dance Real Slow by Michael Grant Jaffe. The film stars Vince Vaughn, Monica Potter, Joey Lauren Adams and Bobby Moat. It received a limited theatrical release in the United States on November 6, 1998, by 20th Century Fox.

== Plot ==
Single father Russ gets woken by his five-year-old son Calvin, who is soaked after getting up to mischief in the rain early in the morning. Cleaning him up makes Russ late to the sitter's, who subsequently won't take Calvin because her daughter is ill, so he is forced to bring Calvin to work.

Russ has to balance work as a lawyer with caring for Calvin after wife and mother Kate left them two years ago. The father and son have moved to small-town Kansas from Chicago after Russ's corporate law firm fired him for not always being available due to his son. Although Russ is very experienced in the courtroom, as he's just passed the Kansas bar exam he's assigned the least appealing case. This smaller law firm hired him thanks to his former college roommate Bob. The client Joyce Ives had crashed into a restaurant with her husband Larry's car, for cheating on her with Carol, a waitress there. She's trying to sue the restaurant.

Calvin receives a postcard from his mom saying she misses him, often sending them although she left them 18 months ago. Grandpa sends Calvin a type of jellyfish from Florida. It is obviously dead but Calvin wants to keep it, naming it "Mom". Kate calls, wanting to talk with him, but Russ won't let her.

Russ also coaches the local high school basketball team. He benches the disrespectful Noah for his frequent absences from practice. When Russ and Calvin are in town, Noah's older sister Beth dumps a bag of dog food on Russ's windshield in retaliation. She frightens Calvin, but offers to make it up to the boy by taking him horseback riding.

Afterwards over lunch, Beth asks Russ out. As the babysitter is not available, she makes them dinner and spends the evening with them. After Calvin falls asleep, Beth and Russ are intimate and drawn into a romantic relationship. This is interrupted when Kate reappears, wanting to reassert herself in her son's life. She calls when Beth is still there the following morning while Russ is showering, so she leaves abruptly. Kate shows up minutes later and Russ is resentful and suspicious of her. She initially says she's available while he admits he's seeing someone.

Russ begins to feel torn between the two women and about what to do with Calvin. Kate's sudden appearance leads him to doubt his ability to raise his son on his own and in his own parenting skills. After a third day with her visit, she stays until late so he lets her stay the night.

A late call from the police gets Russ out to collect Noah who was in a collision and is drunk. He lets him sleep it off in the living room. Later that night, just as Russ starts to think he might reconcile with Kate, she confesses that not only has she fallen in love with someone else, but that she probably never even loved him.

In the morning Beth comes to collect Noah. When she sees Kate coming downstairs looking for Russ, she rushes out. When he follows Beth out, although he insists that things are over with Kate she says she doesn't want to get caught up in it and leaves.

While Russ is in Dallas interviewing for his dream job at a major law firm, he leaves Calvin with the neighbor Charlotte to stay overnight. On his return, when he goes to pick him up he discovers Kate recently has run off with Calvin to Cincinnati.

When Russ realizes the boy is missing, he talks to Beth, who convinces him that Calvin needs him and he must try to get him back. Russ turns down the job in Dallas, and drives to Cincinnati. Kate relinquishes Calvin back to Russ after acknowledging that she can't handle it, and he and Calvin return to Kansas and Beth.

== Cast ==
- Vince Vaughn as Russell Durrell
- Joey Lauren Adams as Beth Ward
- Monica Potter as Kate Durrell
- Bobby Moat as Calvin Durrell
- Devon Sawa as Noah Ward
- Dean McDermott as Deputy Sheriff Pritchard
- Ben Bass as Placement Agent
- Nicholas Campbell as Frankie Gooland
- Siobhan Fallon as Charlotte
- Jenny Robertson as Joyce Ives
- Todd Louiso as Bob Harper
- Skipp Sudduth as Jack Newbauer
- Jennifer Irwin as Connie Harper
- Aleksa Palladino as Bonnie
- Melanie Nicholls-King as Dallas Desk Clerk
- Beth Littleford as Suzanne
- Chris Bauer as Larry Ives
- Janet Kidder as Crystal
- John Lefebvre as Cob Whitman

== Production ==
Author Michael Grant Jaffe first wrote the manuscript for his novel Dance Real Slow in the early 1990s while working as a reporter at Sports Illustrated. Before the novel was published in 1996, Fox 2000 secured the movie rights for six figures. Matthew McDuffie then adapted the book into a screenplay. The film became titled A Cool, Dry Place, which was Jaffe's original title for his book.

Chris O'Donnell was initially attached in the lead role, but the actor's wedding conflicted with the filming schedule and he was also thought of as too young by some producers. The film was shot in Ontario in 1997, with locations including Toronto and the town of Lindsay (now part of the city of Kawartha Lakes).

== Reception ==
On the review aggregator website Rotten Tomatoes, 54% of 13 critics' reviews are positive, with an average rating of 5.5/10.

In a review for Variety, Lael Loewenstein wrote, "Vaughn does what he can with the part, but his unimpassioned demeanor obscures the vulnerability that would have made Russ a more empathetic character. One craves the tenderness of Tom Hanks' widower dad in Sleepless in Seattle or the sentimental journey of Dustin Hoffman's divorced father in Kramer vs. Kramer, but Vaughn's Russ doesn't feel as lived-in as those memorable performances." Other criticisms were of the script's melodramatic aspects and that the characters were underwritten.
