= A Better Place =

- DVD cover
- Directed by: Vincent Pereira
- Written by: Vincent Pereira
- Produced by: Vincent Pereira; Paul C. Finn
- Starring: Eion Bailey; Robert DiPatri
- Cinematography: Ian Dudley
- Edited by: Vincent Pereira
- Music by: Michael Ferentino; Andres Karu; Ben Reed auto vs. pedestrian
- Production company: View Askew Productions
- Distributed by: Synapse Films
- Release date: September 12, 1997 (IFP Market)
- Running time: 87 minutes
- Country: United States
- Language: English
- Budget: $100,000

A Better Place is a 1997 drama film written and directed by Vincent Pereira. It stars Robert DiPatri and Eion Bailey. It was produced in association with View Askew, Kevin Smith's production company, and released to DVD by Synapse Films. It was nominated for the Golden Starfish Award for Best American Independent Film at the 1997 Hamptons International Film Festival. In 2016, the film screened out of jury competition, in the director-curated block, but was chosen as the Audience Favorite Feature Film of the first annual Oil Valley Film Festival.

== Production ==
Director Vincent Pereira was a childhood friend of co-producer Kevin Smith from Leonardo, New Jersey. They had worked together at the convenience store/video store that inspired Smith's hit film Clerks. Another friend of Pereira, Brian Lynch, was a production assistant for A Better Place and has a small role in the film. Lynch went on to become a screenwriter for major animation films.

Smith brought the film to the Independent Feature Film Market in 1997.

== Plot ==
Barret Michaelson is an unwelcome newcomer in a public high school, often bullied by his new classmates. He has no friends until another misfit with a bad reputation, Ryan, saves him from a beating in the men's locker room. Ryan is a misanthropic existentialist with violent tendencies and a dark past. It is revealed that Ryan's father murdered his mother and then committed suicide in front of Ryan when he was only ten years old.

The two become fast friends who spend much of their time together engaged in philosophical conversation, but their friendship comes to an abrupt halt when the two are involved in an incident with a local landowner who claims they are trespassing on his land. Ryan throws a rock at the man, causing him to fall and break his neck on a rock. The two manage to successfully make it look like an accident, but the incident forces Barret to pull away from his friendship with Ryan. This causes Ryan to become very emotional, and to purchase a black market gun. Barret soon agrees that they should put the incident behind them and continue to be friends, but Ryan becomes increasingly morose and attached to Barret.

When Ryan suffers a brutal beating at the hands of the bully against whom Ryan had originally defended Barret, he is consumed by a will for revenge, and makes it clear to Barret that he intends to shoot the bully to death. Barret tries as hard as he can to dissuade Ryan, but Ryan says it's his "destiny" and insists that there is nothing Barret can do to stop him. As the moment of truth approaches, Ryan forces Barret at gun point to accompany him to the would-be crime scene. Ryan finds his enemy smoking in a secluded area. Barret tries to warn him, but it is to no avail, and Ryan kills him. After the killing, Barret tries to incapacitate Ryan by hitting on the head with a rock, but it doesn't work. In a struggle, the gun goes off, claiming Ryan's life. Barret then shoots him once again, and tries to turn the gun on himself, but by that time the gun is out of bullets.

== Cast ==
- Eion Bailey as Ryan
- Robert DiPatri as Barret Michaelson
- Joseph Cassese as Todd
- Carmen Llywelyn as Augustine
- Brian Lynch as Eddie
- Bryan Sproat as Justin
- Molly Castelloe as Meg
- Jason Lee as Dennis Pepper
- Vincent Pereira as Jake
- Richard Lynch as Mr. Raimi
- Scott Mosier as Larry
- Stan Dunbar as Large rude student

== Themes ==
Themes include misanthropy, introversion, teen violence, suicide, fatalism, and existentialism.
