= Kick Some Ass =

Single by Stroke 9

from the album Rip It Off
- Released: August 2001
- Genre: Punk rock; pop punk; alternative rock
- Length: 4:00
- Label: Universal
- Songwriters: Luke Esterkyn, Greg Gueldner, John McDermott, Eric Stock

"Kick Some Ass" is a song recorded by the American rock band Stroke 9. It was a single released from their 2002 album Rip It Off. The song peaked at #36 on the Billboard Modern Rock Tracks chart on September 1, 2001.

"Kick Some Ass" was featured in the film Jay and Silent Bob Strike Back.
