= 1998 MTV Movie Awards =

American film awards ceremony

- Date: Saturday, May 30, 1998
- Location: Barker Hangar, Santa Monica, California
- Country: United States
- Hosted by: Samuel L. Jackson

Television/radio coverage
- Network: MTV

The 1998 MTV Movie Awards were held on Saturday, May 30, 1998, airing on MTV from the Barker Hangar in Santa Monica, California, and hosted by Samuel L. Jackson.

== Performers ==
- Natalie Imbruglia — "Torn"
- The Wallflowers — "Heroes"
- Brandy featuring Ma$e — "Top of the World"

== Presenters ==
- Heather Graham and Robert Downey Jr. — presented Best Villain
- Anne Heche and Jeff Goldblum — presented Best Female Performance
- Denise Richards — introduced Natalie Imbruglia
- Jennifer Love Hewitt and Marlon Wayans — presented Best Kiss
- Jennifer Lopez and Babyface — presented Best Song from a Movie
- Milla Jovovich and Chris Tucker — presented Best Action Sequence
- Christina Ricci and Puff Daddy — presented Breakthrough Performance
- Samuel L. Jackson — introduced The Wallflowers
- Martin Landau — presented the Lifetime Achievement Award
- Jenna Elfman and Woody Harrelson — presented Best Dance Sequence
- Matt Dillon and Cameron Diaz — presented Best On-Screen Duo
- Jamie Lee Curtis and Ray Liotta — presented Best Comedic Performance
- Joey Lauren Adams and Billy Zane — presented Best Fight
- Master P — introduced Brandy featuring Ma$e
- Forest Whitaker — presented Best New Filmmaker
- Minnie Driver — presented Best Male Performance
- Neve Campbell and Courteney Cox-Arquette — presented Best Movie

== Awards ==
Below are the list of nominations. Winners are listed at the top of each list in bold.

=== Best Movie ===
Titanic

- Austin Powers: International Man of Mystery
- Face/Off
- Good Will Hunting
- Men in Black

=== Best Male Performance ===
Leonardo DiCaprio – Titanic

- Nicolas Cage – Face/Off
- Matt Damon – Good Will Hunting
- Samuel L. Jackson – Jackie Brown
- John Travolta – Face/Off

=== Best Female Performance ===
Neve Campbell – Scream 2

- Vivica A. Fox – Soul Food
- Helen Hunt – As Good as It Gets
- Julia Roberts – My Best Friend's Wedding
- Kate Winslet – Titanic

=== Breakthrough Performance ===
Heather Graham – Boogie Nights

- Joey Lauren Adams – Chasing Amy
- Rupert Everett – My Best Friend's Wedding
- Sarah Michelle Gellar – I Know What You Did Last Summer
- Jennifer Lopez – Selena

=== Best On-Screen Duo ===
Nicolas Cage and John Travolta – Face/Off

- Ben Affleck and Matt Damon – Good Will Hunting
- Drew Barrymore and Adam Sandler – The Wedding Singer
- Leonardo DiCaprio and Kate Winslet – Titanic
- Tommy Lee Jones and Will Smith – Men in Black

=== Best Villain ===
Mike Myers – Austin Powers: International Man of Mystery

- Nicolas Cage and John Travolta – Face/Off
- Gary Oldman – Air Force One
- Al Pacino – The Devil's Advocate
- Billy Zane – Titanic

=== Best Comedic Performance ===
Jim Carrey – Liar Liar

- Rupert Everett – My Best Friend's Wedding
- Mike Myers – Austin Powers: International Man of Mystery
- Adam Sandler – The Wedding Singer
- Will Smith – Men in Black

=== Best Song from a Movie ===
Men in Black by Will Smith — Men in Black

- "A Song for Mama" by Boyz II Men — Soul Food
- "Deadweight" by Beck — A Life Less Ordinary
- "Mouth" by Bush — An American Werewolf in Paris
- "My Heart Will Go On" by Céline Dion — Titanic

=== Best Kiss ===
Drew Barrymore and Adam Sandler – The Wedding Singer

- Joey Lauren Adams and Carmen Llywelyn – Chasing Amy
- Matt Damon and Minnie Driver – Good Will Hunting
- Leonardo DiCaprio and Kate Winslet – Titanic
- Kevin Kline and Tom Selleck – In & Out

=== Best Action Sequence ===
Speedboat Chase – Face/Off

- T-Rex Attacks San Diego – The Lost World: Jurassic Park
- Bug Attacks Fortress – Starship Troopers
- Ship Sinks – Titanic
- Motorcycle/Helicopter Chase – Tomorrow Never Dies

=== Best Dance Sequence ===
Mike Myers — "Soul Bossa Nova" (from Austin Powers: International Man of Mystery)

- Mark Addy, Paul Barber, Robert Carlyle, Steve Huison, Hugo Speer and Tom Wilkinson — "You Can Leave Your Hat On" (from The Full Monty)
- Alan Cumming, Lisa Kudrow and Mira Sorvino — "Time After Time" (from Romy and Michele's High School Reunion)
- Cameron Diaz and Ewan McGregor — "Beyond the Sea" (from A Life Less Ordinary)
- Mark Wahlberg — "Machine Gun" (from Boogie Nights)

=== Best Fight ===
Will Smith vs. Cockroach – Men in Black

- Harrison Ford vs. Gary Oldman – Air Force One
- Milla Jovovich vs. Aliens – The Fifth Element
- Demi Moore vs. Viggo Mortensen – G.I. Jane
- Michelle Yeoh vs. Bad Guys – Tomorrow Never Dies

=== Best New Filmmaker ===
- **Peter Cattaneo – The Full Monty**

=== Lifetime Achievement Award ===
- **Clint Howard**
