= Stroke 9 =

American alternative rock band

- Origin: Marin County, California, U.S.
- Genres: Alternative rock; post-grunge
- Years active: 1989–present
- Labels: Rock Ridge Records; Universal Records
- Members: Luke Esterkyn; Jens Funke; John McDermott; Greg Gueldner; Eric Stock
- Past members: Tom Haddad; Kirsten Stromberg; Stephen Heath; Jeremy Fisch
- Website: Official website

Stroke 9 is an American alternative rock band formed in Marin County, California, in 1989.

== History ==
Stroke 9 had their first live performance at Caffe Nuvo in San Anselmo. They split up for the summer and didn't get back together until the summer of 1991. Haddad and Stromberg had no desire to revive Stroke 9, so Esterkyn and Gueldner recruited old schoolmates John McDermott and Stephen Heath. They moved from the basement to the garage and played publicly anywhere that they could. The band put out two independent releases in 1993 and 1995. Eric Stock began filling in on drums in April 1997; Stock was a New York transplant who had previously toured with Modern English.

After signing to Universal Records, the band released Nasty Little Thoughts in 1999, which charted in the US, yielded two rock radio hits, "Little Black Backpack" (originally released in Bumper to Bumper) and "Letters", and was certified Gold by the RIAA on April 21, 2000. The band appeared in the film EDtv as part of the promotion of Nasty Little Thoughts. A second album on Universal followed, entitled Rip It Off. The album's art cover was made to resemble a bootleg CD-R, similar to that of System of a Down's Steal This Album!, which was released about a year later.

The album was not promoted heavily, and its lead single, "Kick Some Ass", was less successful at radio. "Kick Some Ass" appeared in Kevin Smith's Jay and Silent Bob Strike Back during a montage of Jay and Silent Bob flying around the country to attack message board users who bashed them. Late in 2003, the band split with Universal and announced plans to release its next album, All In, independently.

The band released The Last of the International Playboys on June 5, 2007, on Rock Ridge Records. Stroke 9 also recorded "Tap Tap Domination" for the iPhone OS game Tap Tap Revenge. It features "The Yeah Song" as a free downloadable track.

On November 14, 2019, the band announced via their social media a new single Calafrio as well as a new album of the same name. The album was released January 17, 2020. Between 2021 and 2023, Stroke 9 released several singles, one of which was written for the film Losers of Eden. In October 2023, the band released a compilation album called Calafuego, composed of 11 previously released singles.

== Members ==
Position	Current	Original Universal	Original Rock Band
Guitar & Vocals	Luke Esterkyn		
Drums	Greg Gueldner	Eric Stock	Greg Gueldner
Guitar	John McDermott		
Keyboard & Vocals	—N/a		Kirsten Stromberg
Bass	Jens Funke	Greg Gueldner	Tom Haddad

== Discography ==
=== Studio albums ===
Title	Details	Peak chart positions	Certifications
Title	Details	US	Certifications
Boy Meets Girl	Released: April 5, 1993; Label: Self-released; Format: CD	—	
Bumper to Bumper	Released: October 3, 1995; Label: Man!; Format: CD	—	
Nasty Little Thoughts	Released: September 7, 1999; Label: Universal; Format: LP, CD	83	RIAA: Gold
Rip It Off	Released: October 1, 2002; Label: Universal; Format: LP, CD	—	
All In	Released: November 9, 2004; Label: Rock Ridge; Format: LP, CD	—	
The Last of the International Playboys	Released: June 5, 2007; Label: Rock Ridge; Format: LP, CD, streaming	—	
Calafrio	Released: January 17, 2020; Label: King Nummy; Format: LP, CD, digital download, streaming	—	

=== Demo albums ===
- Bad Language Makes for Bad Feelings (1990)
- Music About Friends, Acquaintances, and People We Don't Even Know (1991)

=== Compilation albums ===
- Hidden Treasures (Rock Ridge Records, 2005) [unreleased tracks & other demos]
- Cafe Cuts (Rock Ridge Records, 2006) [acoustic versions of popular songs from their discography]
- Songs We Didn't Love (Released independently, 2020) [unreleased and unfinished demos]
- Calafuego (Released independently, 2023) [11 singles from 2021-2023]

=== Extended plays ===
- Jessica Album Part 1 (EP) (2010)

=== Singles ===
Title	Year	Peak chart positions					Album
Title	Year	US Bub.	US Alt Air.	US Main.	CAN Alt.	NZ	Album
"Little Black Backpack"	1999	4	6	39	3	16	Nasty Little Thoughts
"Letters"	2000	—	27	—	—	—	Nasty Little Thoughts
"Washin' + Wonderin'"	2000	—	—	—	—	—	Nasty Little Thoughts
"Kick Some Ass"	2001	—	36	—	—	—	Rip It Off and Jay and Silent Bob Strike Back
"100 Girls"	2002	—	—	—	—	—	Rip It Off
"Latest Disaster"	2002	—	—	—	—	—	Rip It Off
"It Ends Happily"	2020	—	—	—	—	—	Non-album singles
"Little Drummer Boy"	2023	—	—	—	—	—	Non-album singles
