= Columbus Circle (film) =

- Directed by: George Gallo
- Written by: George Gallo; Kevin Pollak
- Produced by: Christopher Mallick; William Sherak; Jason Shuman
- Starring: Selma Blair; Giovanni Ribisi; Amy Smart; Jason Lee; Kevin Pollak; Beau Bridges
- Cinematography: Anastas N. Michos
- Edited by: Malcolm Campbell
- Music by: Brian Tyler
- Production companies: Oxymoron Entertainment; Blue Star Pictures; G4 Pictures
- Distributed by: Universal Pictures
- Release date: March 6, 2012 (direct-to-video)
- Running time: 82 minutes
- Country: United States
- Language: English
- Budget: $10 million

Columbus Circle is a 2012 American independent thriller film directed by George Gallo and co-written by Gallo and Kevin Pollak. The film stars Selma Blair, Giovanni Ribisi, Beau Bridges, Amy Smart, Jason Lee, and Kevin Pollak. The film was released directly to video in the United States on March 6, 2012. Producer Christopher Mallick is accused of stealing millions of dollars from customers of his now defunct billing company "ePassporte" to fund the production of his films.

This was Robert Guillaume's last film before his death on October 24, 2017.

== Plot ==
An heiress has shut herself inside her Columbus Circle apartment for nearly two decades. A detective investigating the death of one of her neighbors and the duo who move into the subsequently vacant apartment force her to face her fears of the outside world.

== Cast ==
- Selma Blair as Abigail, the reclusive heiress
- Giovanni Ribisi as Detective Frank Giardello
- Amy Smart as Lillian
- Jason Lee as Charlie
- Kevin Pollak as Klandermann, the apartment building's concierge
- Beau Bridges as Dr. Raymond Fontaine, Abigail's sole confidant
- Jason Antoon as Detective Jerry Eaans
- Jerry Penacoli as himself
- Robert Guillaume as Howard Miles
- Samm Levine as Bank Manager

== Production ==
Filming took place in Los Angeles.
