= Jason Lee =

American actor and skateboarder (born 1970)

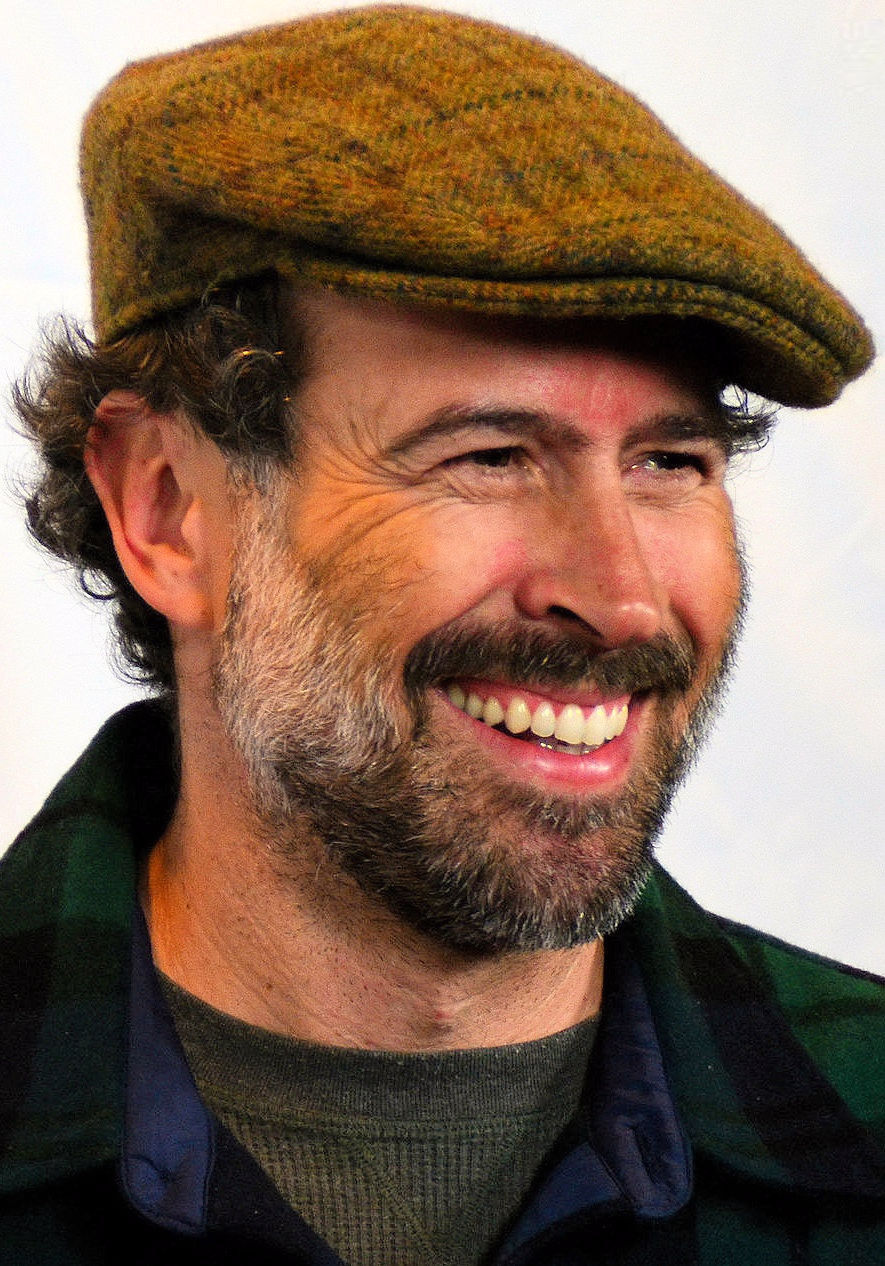
- Lee at the Away and Back premiere in 2015
- Born: Jason Michael Lee; April 25, 1970 (age 56); Santa Ana, California, U.S.
- Occupations: Actor; filmmaker; photographer; professional skateboarder
- Years active: 1980–present
- Spouses: Carmen Llywelyn (m. 1995; div. 2001) Ceren Alkaç (m. 2008)
- Partner: Beth Riesgraf (2001–2007)
- Children: 4
- Sports career
- Country: United States
- Sport: Skateboarding
- Turned pro: 1988
- Retired: 1996

Jason Michael Lee (born April 25, 1970) is an American actor, filmmaker, photographer, and former professional skateboarder. He is known for playing Earl Hickey in the television comedy series My Name Is Earl, for which he was nominated for the Golden Globe Award for Best Actor in a Television Series – Musical or Comedy in 2005 and 2006. He is also known for his roles in Kevin Smith films such as Mallrats (1995), Chasing Amy (1997), Dogma (1999), Jay and Silent Bob Strike Back (2001), Jersey Girl (2004), Clerks II (2006), Cop Out (2010), and Jay and Silent Bob Reboot (2019). Lee won the Independent Spirit Award for Best Supporting Male for his performance in Chasing Amy.

His other notable film roles include starring in Mumford (1999), Almost Famous (2000), Heartbreakers (2001), Big Trouble (2002), Dreamcatcher (2003) and Columbus Circle (2011). His voice acting credits include Syndrome in The Incredibles (2004), Bones in Monster House (2006) and the title character in Underdog (2007). Lee starred as Dave Seville in the live-action/animation Alvin and the Chipmunks films (2007–2015).

A former professional skateboarder, Lee is the co-founder and co-owner of Stereo Skateboards, founding the company in 1992 with fellow skateboarder Chris "Dune" Pastras. Stereo manufactures and distributes skateboard decks, equipment and apparel, as well as producing skate videos.

== Early life ==
Lee was born in Santa Ana, California, on April 25, 1970. His father, Greg Lee, was a car dealership manager and his mother, Carol Lee, was a homemaker. He has an older brother, James (b. 1968). Lee was raised in Huntington Beach and attended Ocean View High School. A hyperactive and energetic child, Lee took up skateboarding after his mother bought him a skateboard with the hope that he would use it to burn off excessive energy. As he developed an interest in the art of skateboarding, Lee spent the majority of his time perfecting his craft, which eventually led to him dropping out of school in order to pursue a professional career.

== Career ==
=== Skateboarding ===
Lee was a professional skateboarder in the late 1980s and early 1990s. In 1992, he founded Stereo Sound Agency, known as Stereo Skateboards, with fellow skater Chris "Dune" Pastras. In 2003, after it had been defunct for a few years, the pair successfully revived the company. As of October 2013, Lee and Pastras remained on the professional "Classics" team roster.

Lee was featured in the skateboarding promotional video, Video Days (1991), filmed for the skateboarding company Blind Skateboards. In 2004, Lee's skateboarding was featured in Way Out East!, a film produced by Stereo Skateboards.

In August 2012, Lee was also featured in a brief video on the skateboard website The Berrics titled "Jason Lee decided to come to the park".

In August 2012, Lee participated in the ninth annual Stand-Up for Skateparks Event, which he chaired with Tony Hawk. The event is held annually by the Tony Hawk Charitable Foundation and seeks to "help create free, quality public skateparks for youth in low-income communities".

In October that same year, a video was released by the Keep A Breast Foundation, featuring various skateboarding identities, including Lee, together with Pastras. The video, contributing to the Foundation's aim to prevent and raise awareness of breast cancer, promotes the "I Love Boobies" bracelet. It also features Clint Peterson (Stereo) and Giovanni Reda (WESC), who are both teammates of Lee.

Lee later worked with Tony Hawk when he lent his voice and likeness to Tony Hawk's Project 8 (2006) to become a playable character. Lee then voiced Coach Frank, a character created during the development of Stereo, in the video game Skate 3 (2010).

Professional skateboarder and owner of the Girl and Lakai Limited Footwear skateboard brands Mike Carroll has cited Lee as one of his skating influences.

Lee has been particularly cited for his 360 flips, which even the trick's inventor, Rodney Mullen, credits him with stylizing and popularizing.

=== Acting ===
After taking some minor acting roles in 1992–1994 (including the music video for the Sonic Youth single "100%", a small part in Mi Vida Loca, and a bit part as a dance instructor on Chance and Things), Lee left professional skateboarding for a full-time acting career. His first major film role was in Kevin Smith's Mallrats, which became a cult hit. This started a friendship that subsequently led to appearances in many of Smith's films, including Chasing Amy, Dogma, Jay and Silent Bob Strike Back, Clerks II, Cop Out, and Jay and Silent Bob Reboot. Lee won an Independent Spirit Award for his role in Chasing Amy as Banky Edwards.

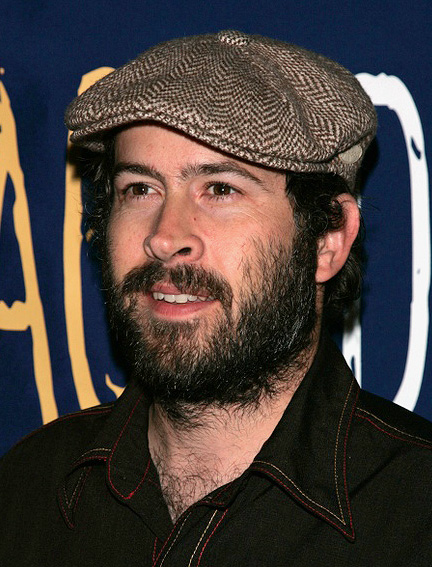
Lee at the Los Angeles Film Festival in 2006

Lee graduated to leading man roles in Heartbreakers, Stealing Harvard, and A Guy Thing. He has had supporting roles in Vanilla Sky, Almost Famous, Dreamcatcher, Big Trouble, The Ballad of Jack and Rose, and Mumford, as well as a minor role in Enemy of the State. Lee also voiced Syndrome in The Incredibles and Jack-Jack Attack. He reprised the role as a "robot copy" of Syndrome in Disney Presents Pixar's The Incredibles in a Magic Kingdom Adventure. Lee is also the voice of Underdog in Underdog and portrays Dave Seville in the 4 live-action/CGI films starring Alvin and the Chipmunks.

In 2005, Lee was offered the lead role in the television series My Name Is Earl. According to interviews on the first-season DVD, he passed on the series twice before finally agreeing to read for the pilot. In the series he stars as Earl Hickey. Lee received two Golden Globe nominations for Best Performance by an Actor in a Television Series – Musical or Comedy in 2006 and 2007, as well as a nomination for the Screen Actors Guild Award for Outstanding Performance by a Male Actor in a Comedy Series in 2006. NBC cancelled My Name Is Earl after four seasons.

On June 22, 2010, Memphis Beat premiered. Lee stars alongside Alfre Woodard and portrays Dwight Hendricks. In October 2011, it was announced the series was not renewed for a third season. He guest-starred in 2010 and 2013 episodes of Raising Hope, created by My Name is Earl creator and producer Greg Garcia.

As of December 2011, Lee appeared in Up All Night, but after its second season, it was officially cancelled on May 9, 2013. In June 2013, Alvin and the Chipmunks: The Road Chip (2015), a fourth and final film in the Alvin and the Chipmunks franchise, was announced by 20th Century Fox; its release date was December 18, 2015.

Lee is in the Amazon Studios 49-minute pilot of Cocked, where he plays the character of Grady Paxson, one of three men who run a family company, manufacturing guns. The show premiered on January 15, 2015, and also stars Brian Dennehy, Diora Baird, Dreama Walker, and Sam Trammell. On January 25, 2015, The Hallmark Channel premiered Away & Back, a Hallmark Hall of Fame film starring Lee, Maggie Elizabeth Jones and Minka Kelly.

=== Photography ===
Lee began taking photos regularly in the early 2000s, and became interested in instant photography. He released his first photo book through Refueled Magazine. It consists of "184 pages of Polaroid & Fuji Instant Film photographs from 2006-2016", printed in an edition of 500 copies. In 2018 he published A Plain View, a photo book consisting of color 4×5 photographs from his exploration of rural and urban America. From June to December 2019, his photographs of Oklahoma were exhibited in exhibit OK: Jason Lee Photographs in Philbrook Museum of Art. These works are scheduled to be released as the book OK in 2022. In December 2020, British publishing house Stanley/Barker released In the Gold Dust Rush, consisting of black and white photographs of rural America. In 2021, Lee released Galveston, commissioned by the Galveston Historical Foundation. He is inspired by work of New Topographics movement, notably by Henry Wessell. He photographs on film. In 2023, Lee opened a photography shop in Los Angeles called Eagle Rock Camera; it closed in 2026.

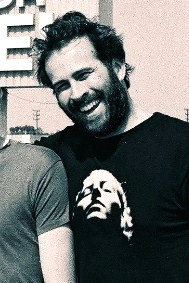
Lee on the roof of the Beverly Laurel Hotel on June 28, 2005

== Personal life ==
Lee married actress and photographer Carmen Llywelyn in 1995. They divorced in 2001. Llywelyn later said that Lee's commitment to Scientology was the principal reason for their separation. Llywelyn wrote that their relationship collapsed when she revealed to her talent manager and fellow Scientologist, Gay Ribisi (mother of actor Giovanni Ribisi and actress Marissa Ribisi), that she had read A Piece of Blue Sky, a book about the reality of Scientology. Two days after her conversation with Ribisi, Llywelyn received a one-paragraph "disconnection letter" from Lee and was labeled a suppressive person.

Following his divorce from Llywelyn, Lee became engaged to actress Beth Riesgraf. Together, they have a son, Pilot Inspektor, born in 2003. Lee states their son's name was inspired by "He's Simple, He's Dumb, He's the Pilot." by rock band Grandaddy.

Lee married Ceren Alkaç in California in July 2008. A month later, Alkaç gave birth to a daughter named Casper. The couple had their second child, a son named Sonny, in 2012. Their third child, a daughter named Alberta 'Birdy' Lee, was born in 2017.

In 2016, Lee revealed that he is no longer a Scientologist. When asked by The Guardian why he became a Scientologist he said, "Everybody wants answers, everybody wants to feel less depressed or less anxious or they want to try to understand some issue that they might have with themselves." He added: "Ultimately, it was just not for me. That's it. I wasn't really involved going back many, many years now."

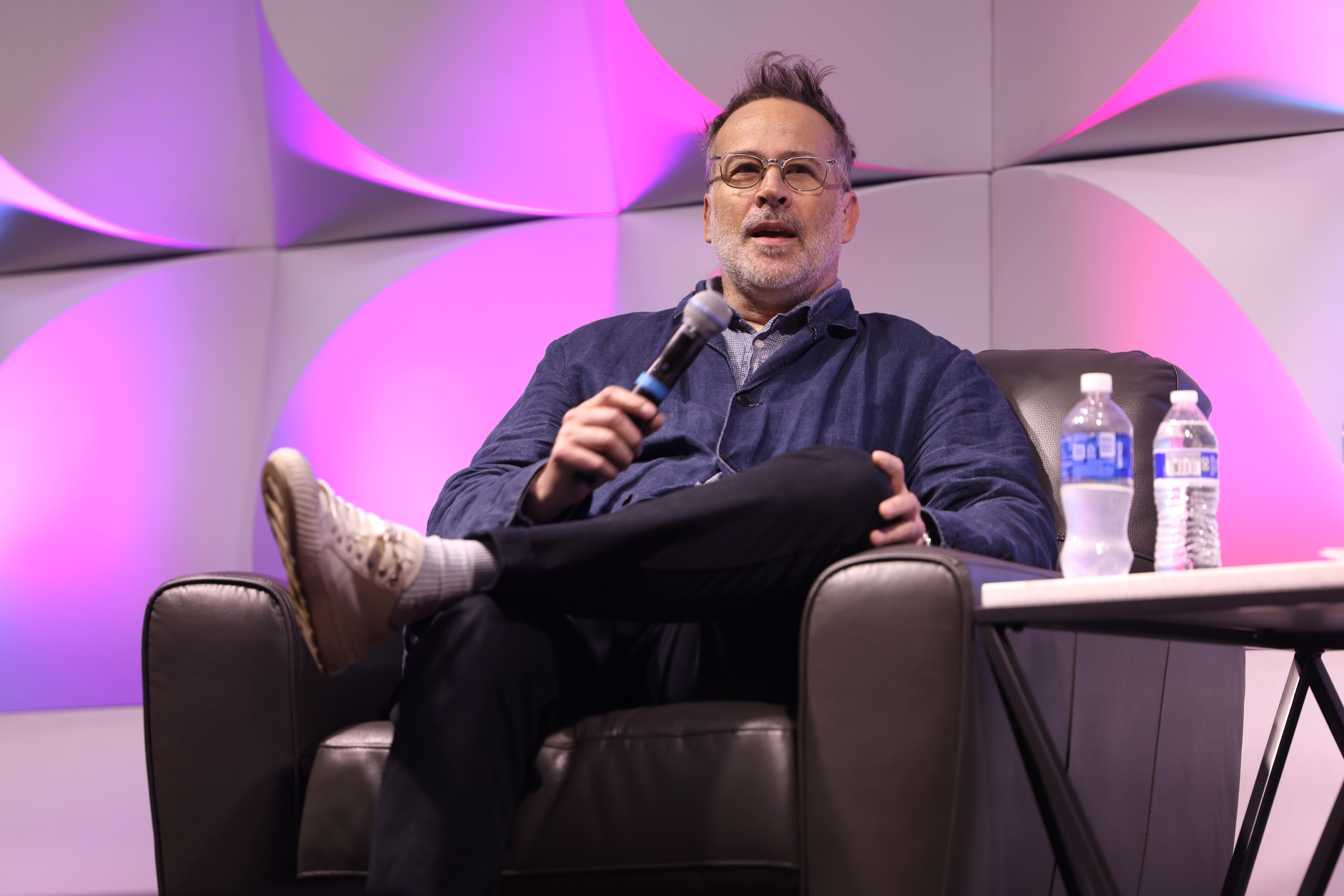
Lee in 2025

Lee currently resides in Los Angeles, California, with his family after living in Denton, Texas, for four years. He was a 1/5th co-owner of the restaurant Barley and Board before its closure.

== Filmography ==
=== Film ===
Year	Title	Role	Notes
1991	Video Days	Himself	Blind Skateboards
1993	A Visual Sound	Himself	Stereo Skateboards
1993	Mi Vida Loca	Teenage Drug Customer	Also known as My Crazy Life
1994	Chance and Things	Dance Instructor on the Television	
1995	Mallrats	Brodie Bruce	
1996	Drawing Flies	Donner	
1996	Tincan Folklore	Himself	Stereo Skateboards
1997	Chasing Amy	Banky Edwards	
1997	A Better Place	Dennis Pepper	
1998	Kissing a Fool	Jay Murphy	
1998	American Cuisine	Loren Collins	
1998	Enemy of the State	Daniel Zavitz	
1999	Dogma	Azrael	
1999	Mumford	Skip Skipperton	
2000	Almost Famous	Jeff Bebe	
2001	Heartbreakers	Jack Withrowe	
2001	Jay and Silent Bob Strike Back	Brodie Bruce / Banky Edwards	
2001	Vanilla Sky	Brian Shelby	
2002	Big Trouble	Puggy	
2002	Stoked: The Rise and Fall of Gator	Himself	Documentary
2002	Stealing Harvard	John Plummer	
2003	A Guy Thing	Paul Morse	
2003	Dreamcatcher	Beaver Clarendon	
2003	I Love Your Work	Larry Hortense	
2004	Oh, What a Lovely Tea Party	Himself	Documentary
2004	Jersey Girl	PR Exec #1	
2004	The Incredibles	Buddy Pine / Syndrome	Voice
2005	Jack-Jack Attack	Buddy Pine / Syndrome	Voice, short film
2005	The Ballad of Jack and Rose	Gray	
2005	Drop Dead Sexy	Frank	
2006	Clerks II	Lance Dowds	
2006	Rising Son: The Legend of Christian Hosoi	Himself	Documentary
2006	Monster House	Bones	Voice
2007	Underdog	Shoeshine / Underdog	Voice
2007	The Man Who Souled the World	Himself	Documentary
2007	Alvin and the Chipmunks	David "Dave" Seville	
2009	Alvin and the Chipmunks: The Squeakquel	David "Dave" Seville	
2010	Cop Out	Roy	
2011	Noah's Ark: The New Beginning	Japheth	Voice
2011	The Other Side	Mortimer Flybait	Voice
2011	Columbus Circle	Charlie	
2011	Alvin and the Chipmunks: Chipwrecked	David "Dave" Seville	
2014	Behaving Badly	Father Krumins	
2014	Tell	Ray	
2015	Alvin and the Chipmunks: The Road Chip	David "Dave" Seville	
2017	Growing Up Smith	Butch Brunner	
2019	Jay and Silent Bob Reboot	Brodie Bruce	
2020	We Bare Bears: The Movie	Charlie	Voice
2024	The 4:30 Movie	Brian's dad	

=== Television ===
Year	Title	Role	Notes
1997	Weapons of Mass Distraction	Phillip Messenger	Television film
1997	Perversions of Science	Bob	1 episode
2005–2009	My Name Is Earl	Earl Hickey	96 episodes
2005	Saturday Night Live	Host / various roles	1 episode
2006, 2016	American Dad!	Officer Bays / Sam	Voice, 2 episodes
2010–2011	Memphis Beat	Dwight Hendricks	20 episodes
2011–2012	Up All Night	Kevin	7 episodes
2010–2013	Raising Hope	Smokey Floyd	3 episodes
2013	Men at Work	Donnie	Episode: "Tyler the Pioneer"
2015	Cocked	Grady Paxson	Television film
2015	Away and Back	Jack Peterson	Television film
2015–2019	We Bare Bears	Charlie	Voice, 22 episodes
2021	The Harper House	Freddie Harper	Voice, 10 episodes
2024	Lego Pixar: BrickToons	Syndrome	Voice, Episode: "Pizza Night"
2025	The Residence	Tripp Morgan	

=== Video games ===
Year	Title	Role	Notes
2004	The Incredibles	Buddy Pine / Syndrome	
2004	The Incredibles: When Danger Calls	Buddy Pine / Syndrome	
2006	Tony Hawk's Project 8	Himself	Also motion capture
2007	Alvin and the Chipmunks	David "Dave" Seville	
2010	Skate 3	Coach Frank	
2013	Disney Infinity	Buddy Pine / Syndrome	
2015	Disney Infinity 3.0	Buddy Pine / Syndrome	
2018	Lego The Incredibles	Buddy Pine / Syndrome	
2026	Disney Speedstorm	Buddy Pine / Syndrome	

== Awards and nominations ==
Year	Award	Category	Nominated work	Result
1998	Independent Spirit Awards	Best Supporting Male	Chasing Amy	Won
1998	Stinkers Bad Movie Awards	Worst On-Screen Hairstyle	Kissing a Fool	Nominated
2001	Blockbuster Entertainment Awards	Favorite Supporting Actor – Drama/Romance	Almost Famous	Nominated
2001	Online Film Critics Society Awards	Best Ensemble	Almost Famous	Won
2001	Screen Actors Guild Awards	Outstanding Performance by a Cast in a Motion Picture	Almost Famous	Nominated
2005	Satellite Awards	Best Actor – Television Series Musical or Comedy	My Name is Earl	Nominated
2006	Golden Globe Awards	Best Actor – Television Series Musical or Comedy	My Name is Earl	Nominated
2006	Satellite Awards	Best Actor – Television Series Musical or Comedy	My Name is Earl	Nominated
2006	Screen Actors Guild Awards	Outstanding Performance by an Ensemble in a Comedy Series	My Name is Earl	Nominated
2006	Screen Actors Guild Awards	Outstanding Performance by a Male Actor in a Comedy Series	My Name is Earl	Nominated
2006	Teen Choice Awards	Choice TV Actor – Comedy	My Name is Earl	Nominated
2006	Television Critics Association Awards	Individual Achievement in Comedy	My Name is Earl	Nominated
2007	Golden Globe Awards	Best Actor – Television Series Musical or Comedy	My Name is Earl	Nominated
2007	Kids' Choice Awards	Favorite Male TV Star	My Name is Earl	Nominated
2007	Screen Actors Guild Awards	Outstanding Performance by a Male Actor in a Comedy Series	My Name is Earl	Nominated
2009	Kids' Choice Awards	Favorite Male TV Star	My Name is Earl	Nominated
2016	Golden Raspberry Awards	Worst Supporting Actor	Alvin and the Chipmunks: The Road Chip	Nominated
