= Free (film) =

- Directed by: Andrew Avery
- Written by: Peter Gibson, Michael Kingston
- Starring: Randall Batinkoff, Carmen Llywelyn, and Corin Nemec
- Cinematography: Jens Sturup
- Edited by: Carlo Gustaff
- Music by: Micha Liberman
- Distributed by: Showtime
- Release date: 2001
- Running time: 96 minutes
- Country: United States
- Language: English

Free is a 2001 romantic dramedy. It was directed by Andrew Avery, written by Peter Hansen Gibson and Michael Kingston, and starred Corin Nemec, Randall Batinkoff, Carmen Llywelyn and Ione Skye.

Free was produced by Thor Films and distributed by Showtime.

== Cast ==
- Boris Eckey as Klaust
- Corin Nemec as Mark Jenkins
- Randall Batinkoff as Lawrence
- Ione Skye as Catherine
- Carmen Llywelyn as Laura
- J. Kenneth Campbell as James Jenkins
- Ellen Crawford as Barbara Jenkins
- Dawn Maxey as June
- Tia Riebling as Carmen
- Shawnee Free Jones as Marna
- Lenore Thomas as Josie
- Theo Nicholas Pagones as Gustavo
- Clay Wilcox as Bob
- Alan Woolf as Daniel Waldoff
- Danny Goldman as Dr.
- Dax Griffin as Skeet
- Peter Hansen Gibson as Gibby
- Michael Kingston as King
- Mary Gillis as Marge
- Brandon Keener as Bill Stein
- Michelle Arthur as Secretary
- Alla Korot as Intimidating Girl
- Alexander Martin as Jesus
