= Chris Pastras =

American skateboarder, artist, and skate company owner

Chris "Dune" Pastras (born July 14, 1972) is an artist, skateboarder, entrepreneur, skate company owner, and television host.

== Early life ==
Pastras grew up in New Jersey, raised with and mentored by Rodney Smith. Pastras got his first skateboard in 1979 at age 7, a gift from Rodney. Pastras is mixed-race, half-Greek and half-African-American. Pastras was raised by two black women.

== Skateboarding career ==
Pastras' first sponsor was SHUT skateboards in his early teens. In 1990, Pastras left SHUT to ride for World Industries, appearing in Rubbish Heap - 1989 and Two World Industries Men - 1990. After World Industries, Pastras rode for Blue skateboards. In 1992, Pastras and Jason Lee founded STEREO Skateboard. Pastras starred in the STEREO skate video Tincan Folklore.

Pastras graced the cover of Slap magazine in May 1992. In 1993, Pastras graced the cover of Transworld Skateboarding.

=== Stereo skateboards ===
Stereo used jazz imagery, combined with Pastras' artwork, and super-8 skate footage giving Stereo a unique vibe.

== Acting / Television host ==
In 2019, Pastras plays a host in the Jason Lee directed music video for E.B. The Younger titled: When The Time Comes.
