= Man of the Year (2002 film) =

- Directed by: Straw Weisman
- Produced by: Betsy Fels; Andy Goldberg; Richard Mann
- Starring: John Ritter Lin Shaye Leeza Gibbons Jon Jacobs
- Cinematography: Al Satterwhite
- Edited by: Bill Black
- Music by: David S. Kates; Jeffrey Silverman
- Release dates: 12 April 2002 (Method Fest Independent Film Festival); 5 December 2003 (Los Angeles)
- Running time: 101 minutes
- Country: United States
- Language: English
- Budget: $25,000

Man of the Year is a 2002 American black comedy film directed by Straw Weisman, starring John Ritter.

== Plot ==
Bill, the head of a large energy firm, attends a party at a Hollywood Hills home. During the course of the night, secrets are revealed and broken and relationships change forever.

== Cast ==
- John Ritter as Bill
- Jade Carter as Jim
- Adria Dawn as Chloe
- Brian Cousins as Phil
- Heidi Mark as Carol
- Idalis DeLeón as Joan
- Clayton Landey as Stuart
- Khrystyne Haje as Vanessa
- Danny Ponce as Mickey
- Lin Shaye as Flora
- Kathleen Gati as Ella
- Leeza Gibbons as The Reporter
- Archie Hahn as Nick
- Amy Hill as The Maid
- Jon Jacobs as Johnathan
- Shawnee Free Jones as Anna
- Samantha Lloyd as Sylvia
- Ivo Lopez as The Butler
- Kristen Miller as Sally
- Jack Mosshammer as Parker
- Oliver Muirhead as Reg
- Annie Sorell as Shauna
- Rebecca Harrell Tickell as Donna
- James Wilder as Vaughn
- Marian Zapico as Zarita

== Production ==
The film was shot in 12 hours on July 27, 2001. Ritter was reportedly paid $100 for his work in the film.

== Reception ==
Robert Koehler of Variety wrote that while the cast "proves improvisationally capable," the plot is "rather conventional."

Kevin Thomas of the Los Angeles Times wrote that Weisman "slices and dices his images to such an extent that it takes a lot of time for the story lines and the key characters and their tangled and changing relationships to emerge with any clarity", and that "when it becomes possible to identify the people and keep track of them, they by and large prove to be generic characters rather than distinctive individuals."
