= Cafe Cuts =

Cafe Cuts: A Collection Of Acoustic Favorites

Studio album by Stroke 9
- Released: February 7, 2006
- Genre: Alternative rock
- Length: 52:59
- Label: Rock Ridge Records

Stroke 9 chronology
Hidden Treasures (2005)	Cafe Cuts: A Collection Of Acoustic Favorites (2006)	The Last of the International Playboys (2007)

Cafe Cuts: A Collection Of Acoustic Favorites is an album released by Stroke 9 on February 7, 2006. It is composed of acoustic versions of popular songs from their discography.

== Track listing ==
No.	Title	Length
1.	"Washin' & Wonderin'"	04:29
2.	"Little Black Back Pack"	04:28
3.	"Do It Again"	05:01
4.	"Make It Last"	03:50
5.	"Vacuum Bag"	04:45
6.	"Letters"	03:53
7.	"Next Time"	04:08
8.	"Liar"	03:37
9.	"Tear Me in Two"	05:22
10.	"City Life"	04:57
11.	"Just Can't Wait"	04:03
12.	"California"	04:26
Total length:		52:59
