= Shawnee Free Jones =

American actress

Shawnee Free Jones (born 1975) is an American actress and model.

Jones had a successful career as an underwater fashion model, becoming the muse of photographer Howard Schatz.

Working with Schatz, she appeared in advertisements for Target Corporation, Sony, the MGM Grand station, Kohler Co., Wolford, Wacoal, and Palmer's Cocoa Butter. She was dubbed "America's Underwater Supermodel" by Maxim, and her image was placed on the Empire State Building during Schatz's "Installation" project. She also appeared on the cover of Schatz's book, Pool Light.

She appeared as the underwater dancer in Ricky Martin's music video for "She Bangs" and guest starred as an underwater mystery on Baywatch. Jones also appeared as a punk girl in an episode of the cult teen comedy-drama Freaks and Geeks.

She is the daughter of American spiritual guru Adi Da.

== Filmography ==
- L.A. Confidential (1997)
- Denial (1998)
- American Intellectuals (1999)
- Women of the Night (2000)
- Monkeybone (2001)
- Free (2001)
- Mr. BBQ (2002)
- Man of the Year (2002)
- Never Get Out of the Boat (2002)

== Notable TV guest appearances ==
- Baywatch (1989) in episode "Maui Xterra"
- The Huntress (2000) playing "Temp" in "Surprise Party"
- Gideon's Crossing (2000) playing "Joanne Cooper" in "Gift, The"
- Freaks and Geeks (1999) playing "Jenna Zank" in "Noshing and Moshing"
