= Alex Martin (actress) =

American actress (born 1974)

- Born: Alexandrea Martin; May 9, 1973 (age 53)
- Other name: Alex Dean
- Occupations: Actress; film producer
- Years active: 1993–present
- Spouse: Bernard Dean (m. 2011)
- Children: 3
- Mother: Whoopi Goldberg

Alexandrea Martin (born May 9, 1973) is an American actress and film producer. She was awarded the title of Miss Golden Globe at the 1994 Golden Globe Awards.

== Personal life ==
Alexandrea Martin is the daughter of American actress Whoopi Goldberg and her British first husband, Alvin Martin.

Martin has three children, two daughters and a son. She had one child with HJ, a biracial Vietnamese and Black high school classmate whom she met while living in Berkeley. Martin had her second and third children with her then-husband, Bernard Dean, whom she later divorced. Martin and Dean remarried on October 15, 2011. She also has a grandchild.

== Filmography ==
Year	Title	Role	Notes
1993	Sister Act 2: Back in the Habit	Classroom Kid	
1993	Quest of the Delta Knights	Mannerjay's	Direct-to-video
1999	American Intellectuals	Hugh	
2001	Call Me Claus	Member of the congregation	TV movie
2003	Strange as Angels	Maria	
2008	Descendants	—N/a	Short film Producer
2015–2018	The View	Herself	3 episodes - Guest co-host Credited as Alex Martin Dean
2018	Sensitive Men	—N/a	Short film Associate producer
