= Vincent Pereira =

American independent filmmaker (born 1973)

- Born: March 11, 1973 (age 52); New Jersey, U.S.
- Occupations: Director; writer; editor; actor
- Years active: 1992–present
- Website: viewaskew.com/vincent/

Vincent Pereira (born March 11, 1973) is an American independent filmmaker, known for his work with Kevin Smith and View Askew. He is regarded as the unofficial "View Askew Historian".

== Background ==
Pereira was born and raised in New Jersey. During his junior year of high school, Vincent started working at the Quick Stop and RST Video convenience store, where he met future filmmaker Kevin Smith. The two quickly became friends and would often spend time together while working at the store. When they closed the store at night, the two went to see independent films in New York City. This would eventually result in Smith seeing Slacker, which would inspire him to make his low budget first film Clerks. Pereira served as assistant camera, grip and "cat wrangler" on the film and made a few cameos. Pereira worked on Kevin's later films Mallrats, Chasing Amy, Dogma, Jay and Silent Bob Strike Back, and Clerks 3.

== Other films ==
In 1997, Smith financed three films under the View Askew label, Vulgar (where Pereira served as workprint editor), Big Helium Dog (where Pereira served as editor and played a bit part) and A Better Place (which Pereira served as writer, director, editor and played a bit part). A Better Place featured various people involved with View Askew, both on and off camera. The film played at the Angelica Theater under the IFFM (where Clerks was discovered four years earlier). A DVD was released in 2001.
