= Joey Lauren Adams =

American actress (born 1968)

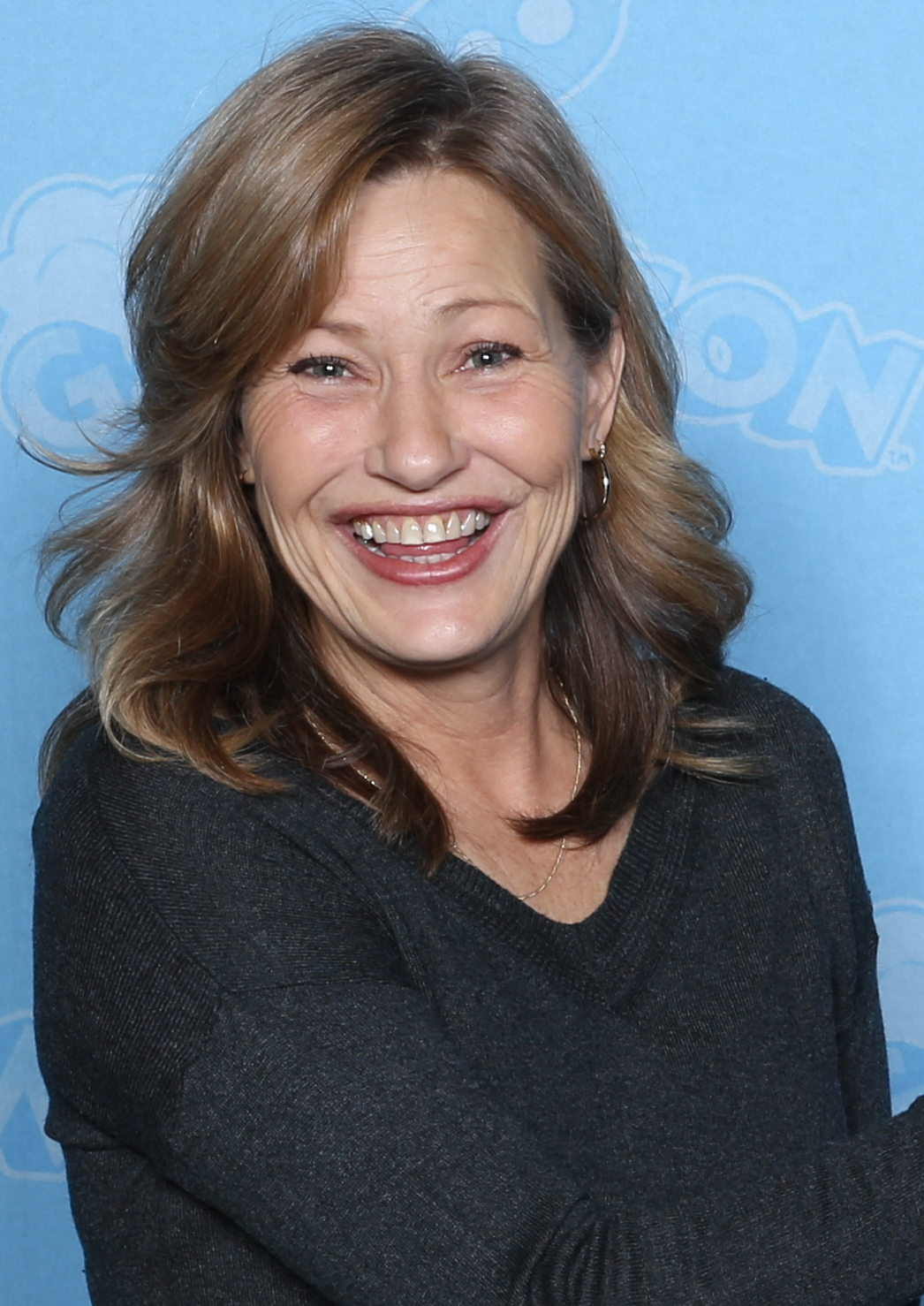
- Adams at GalaxyCon Columbus in December 2022
- Born: January 9, 1968 (age 58); North Little Rock, Arkansas, U.S.
- Occupations: Actress, director
- Years active: 1977–present
- Spouse: Brian Vilim (m. 2014)

Joey Lauren Adams (born January 9, 1968) is an American actress and director. Adams starred in Chasing Amy, for which she was nominated for the Golden Globe Award for Best Actress – Motion Picture Musical or Comedy, and played smaller roles in other Kevin Smith View Askewniverse films.

== Career ==
Adams was born to Karen Bonner and Lyle Adams in North Little Rock, Arkansas. She has two older siblings and grew up going to Park Hill Baptist Church in North Little Rock. In 1991, she appeared in "Top of the Heap", the 100th episode of Married... with Children, and then starred in its short-lived spinoff. In 1993, Adams landed her first major film role as Simone in Richard Linklater's Dazed and Confused. In the same year, she appeared in the Saturday Night Live spinoff film Coneheads as one of Connie Conehead's friends. Two years later, Adams appeared in Mallrats, written and directed by Kevin Smith. The two dated during the film's post-production, and their relationship provided the inspiration for Smith's next film, Chasing Amy. The relationship did not last long but ended on friendly terms. Meanwhile, in 1996, while Smith was finalizing the script for Chasing Amy, Adams was cast in the slapstick comedy Bio-Dome, which was directed by Jason Bloom. Adams played Monique, Bud Macintosh's (Pauly Shore's) girlfriend.

Adams played a leading role in 1997's Chasing Amy, portraying Alyssa Jones, a lesbian who falls in love with Ben Affleck's character. Later, Smith said that Chasing Amy was a "sort of penance/valentine" and a "thank-you homage" to Adams. In addition to acting in the film, Adams wrote and performed the song "Alive" for the film's soundtrack. Kelly Adams, an older sister of Joey's, was her assistant on the set of Chasing Amy. Their mother, Karen Bonner, insisted that Joey live in San Diego with a friend of the family's at first, before moving to Los Angeles.

Joey Adams' performance in Chasing Amy earned her both the 1997 Chicago Film Critics Award and Las Vegas Film Critics Society Award for Most Promising Actress, and a Golden Globe nomination for Best Actress-Motion Picture Musical or Comedy. From there, Adams was originally slated to play the female lead in Smith's next film, 1999's Dogma, but Linda Fiorentino ultimately won the role. However, she would later make brief appearances in two other Smith projects: the 2001 film Jay and Silent Bob Strike Back, and the 2004 animated short Clerks: The Lost Scene, featured on the Clerks X DVD. In both of these appearances, Adams reprises the role of Alyssa Jones. Her post-Smith projects included playing a spunky veterinarian's assistant who falls in love with a single father (Vince Vaughn) in 1998's A Cool, Dry Place. The next year, Adams appeared in her first big-budget Hollywood release, playing Adam Sandler's love interest in the successful comedy Big Daddy. She then appeared in many smaller films, including Beautiful and In the Shadows. In 2005, she had a guest role in an episode of the TV series Veronica Mars.

In 2006, Adams released her directorial debut film, Come Early Morning, starring Ashley Judd, Jeffrey Donovan, Diane Ladd, Tim Blake Nelson and Laura Prepon. The film, shot on location in Little Rock, Arkansas, was selected for the 2006 Sundance Film Festival. Also in 2006, she along with Lian Lunson and Nicole Holofcener, was awarded the Women in Film Dorothy Arzner Directors Award. On November 24, 2009, Interscope Records released Adams' directorial debut for a music video entitled "Belle of the Boulevard" by Dashboard Confessional. Adams returned to TV in March 2010, on the Showtime series The United States of Tara. She appeared in six episodes as Pammy, a barmaid who falls for Buck, one of the title character's alternate personalities.

Adams is known for her distinctive voice which one film critic referred to as that of a "sex-kitten-on-helium". Regarding her voice, Adams commented, "It's not a normal voice. It doesn't fit into people's preconceptions about what a woman's voice should sound like. My mom doesn't think I have an unusual voice, though. I'm sure it's helped me get some roles. But Chasing Amy I almost didn't get. There was concern the voice would grate on some people, which some critics said it did." Another film critic said that whether viewers loved it or hated it, her voice had "the potential to hypnotize."

== Personal life ==
Adams was born in North Little Rock, Arkansas, the youngest of three children. Her father was a lumber yard owner. Adams grew up in the Overbrook neighborhood and graduated from North Little Rock Northeast High School in 1986. She announced her intention to pursue acting after one year as an exchange student in Australia. In a May 7, 1997, appearance on The Tonight Show with Jay Leno to promote Chasing Amy, Adams revealed she was a niece to Hee-Haw cast member and ordained minister Grady Nutt.

Adams and Brian Vilim, a cinematographer, married at Adams' friends' farm in Maumelle, Arkansas in 2014.

Before her marriage, Adams was famously linked to filmmaker Kevin Smith in the mid-1990s after they met on the set of Mallrats. Though they split up in 1997, Smith later credited Adams—who served as his muse for Chasing Amy—with profoundly shaping his personal growth and preparing him for his own long-term marriage. She also briefly dated actor Vince Vaughn in 1998.

== Filmography ==
Key
†	Denotes productions that have not yet been released

=== Film ===
Year	Title	Role	Notes
1993	Coneheads	Christina	
1993	Dazed and Confused	Simone Kerr	
1993	The Program	Louanne Winters	
1993	The Pros & Cons of Breathing	Shirley	
1994	Sleep with Me	Lauren	
1994	S.F.W.	Monica Dice	
1995	Mallrats	Gwen Turner	
1996	Bio-Dome	Monique	
1996	Drawing Flies	Hippy Chick	
1996	Michael	Anita	
1997	Chasing Amy	Alyssa Jones	Chicago Film Critics Association Award for Most Promising Actress; Nominated—Golden Globe Award for Best Actress – Motion Picture Musical or Comedy; Nominated—MTV Movie Award for Best Kiss (with Carmen Llywelyn); Nominated—MTV Movie Award for Best Breakthrough Performance
1998	A Cool, Dry Place	Beth Ward	
1999	Big Daddy	Layla Maloney	Nominated—Blockbuster Entertainment Award for Favorite Supporting Actress – Comedy
2000	Bruno	Donna Marie	
2000	Beautiful	Ruby	
2001	Harvard Man	Chesney Cort	
2001	Dr. Dolittle 2	Squirrel	Voice
2001	Reaching Normal	Sarah	
2001	In the Shadows	Clarissa Huston	
2001	Jay and Silent Bob Strike Back	Alyssa Jones	Cameo
2002	Grand Champion	Hallie	
2002	Beeper	Inspector Julia Hyde	
2003	The Big Empty	Grace	
2004	The Gunman	Daphne	
2004	Clerks: The Lost Scene	Alyssa	Only featured in the 2004 Special Edition
2006	The Break-Up	Addie Jones	
2007	Bunny Whipped	Ann	
2008	Trucker	Jenny Bell	
2009	ExTerminators	Kim	
2010	Endure	Sirena Lane	
2011	Big Swim	The Egg	
2011	Apart	Dr. Jane Sheppard	
2012	The Birthday Present	Mom	Short film
2012	Mulberry Stains	Savannah	
2012	Art Machine	Prudence	
2013	Blue Caprice	Jamie	
2013	A Country Christmas	Renae Logan	
2013	She Loves Me Not	Beth	
2014	Making the Rules	Becca	
2014	Sequoia	Bev	
2014	Valley Inn	Althea	
2014	Animal	Vicky	
2014	All the Birds Have Flown South	Tonya	
2019	Jay and Silent Bob Reboot	Alyssa Jones	
2022	Tankhouse	Deirdra	
2024	Oak	Mrs. Chase	
2024	Greedy People	Bobette	
2026	Same Same But Different †	Rebecca	

=== Television ===
Year	Title	Role	Notes
1991	Top of the Heap	Mona Mullins	7 episodes
1991	Married... with Children	Mona Mullins	Episode: "Top of the Heap"
1991	Married... with Children	Cousin Effie	Episode: "Buck Has a Belly Ache"
1992	Vinnie & Bobby	Mona Mullins	7 episodes
1992	CBS Schoolbreak Special	Dianne	Episode: "Words Up!"
1993	Married... with Children	Janie	Episode: "The Wedding Show"
1995	Love & War	Vicky	Episode: "Atlantic City"
1995	Out of Order	Whitney	Episode: "Strange Habit"
1995	Double Rush	Dee Dee	Episode: "Slamming Into a Car Isn't Good"
1996	Second Noah	Darby	5 episodes
1999	Hercules	Electra	Voice, episode: "Hercules and the Complex Electra"
2003	As Told by Ginger	Thea Mipson	Episode: "Far from Home"
2003–04	Stripperella	Catt	Voice, 2 episodes
2005	What's New, Scooby-Doo?	Rachel	Voice, episode: "A Scooby-Doo Valentine"
2005	Veronica Mars	Geena Stafford	Episode: "Weapons of Class Destruction"
2009–10	Party Down	Diandra Stiltskin	2 episodes
2010	Tough Trade	Shawnelle	Television film
2010	United States of Tara	Pammy	6 episodes
2010	Frenemies	Joy Hardwick	Unsold TV pilot
2012	Supermoms	Kelly	Unsold TV pilot
2013–14	Switched at Birth	Jeniece Papagus	4 episodes
2015	Grey's Anatomy	Dr. Tracy McConnell	Episode: "Sledgehammer"
2016–17	Still the King	Debbie Lynn Cooke	26 episodes
2022	The L Word: Generation Q	Taylor	3 episodes
