= American Intellectuals =

American Intellectuals is a (1999) satire film written and directed by Paige Taylor, starring Peter Hansen Gibson, Shawnee Free Jones, Portia de Rossi and Alex Martin.

== Plot Outline ==
Seven WASP, blonde, privileged teens reside in the exclusive Hamptons, New York. Their group and entire existence consists of PLUs (People Like Us).

== Cast ==
- Peter Hansen Gibson as Parker
- Shawnee Free Jones as Jennifer
- Alex Martin as Hugh
- Portia de Rossi as Sarah
- Alison Dean as Beatrice
- Anne Kelly as Sissy
- Andrew Lauren as Ashtentino
- Jan Schweiterman as Cooper
- Rod Biermann as James
- Michael Green as Timothy Leary
- Michael Sutton as Deckhand
