= Jay and Silent Bob Strike Back =

2001 film directed by Kevin Smith

- Theatrical release poster
- Directed by: Kevin Smith
- Written by: Kevin Smith
- Produced by: Scott Mosier
- Starring: Ben Affleck; Eliza Dushku; Shannon Elizabeth; Will Ferrell; Ali Larter; Jason Lee; Jason Mewes; Chris Rock
- Cinematography: Jamie Anderson
- Edited by: Kevin Smith; Scott Mosier
- Music by: James L. Venable
- Production company: View Askew Productions
- Distributed by: Miramax Films (through Dimension Films)
- Release dates: August 15, 2001 (Mann Bruin Theater); August 24, 2001 (United States)
- Running time: 104 minutes
- Country: United States
- Language: English
- Budget: $22 million
- Box office: $33.8 million

Jay and Silent Bob Strike Back is a 2001 American satirical stoner buddy action comedy film written, co-edited, and directed by Kevin Smith. The film stars Jason Mewes and Smith, respectively, as the two eponymous characters, along with Ben Affleck, Eliza Dushku, Shannon Elizabeth, Will Ferrell, Ali Larter, Jason Lee, and Chris Rock. It is the fifth film in the View Askewniverse. The story follows Jay and Silent Bob as they discover a movie is being made about their comic book alter-egos, Bluntman and Chronic, but they've been cut out of the profits, leading them to travel to Hollywood to sabotage the film's production. The title and logo for Jay and Silent Bob Strike Back are direct references to The Empire Strikes Back (1980).

Originally intended to be the last film set in the Askewniverse, or to feature Jay and Silent Bob, it features many characters from the previous View Askew films, some in dual roles and/or reprising roles.

Jay and Silent Bob Strike Back had its premiere at the Mann Bruin Theater in Los Angeles, California on August 15, 2001, and was released in the United States on August 24 by Miramax Films (through Dimension Films). The film received mixed reviews from critics and grossed $33.8 million against a budget of $22 million.

A sequel, Jay and Silent Bob Reboot, was released in October 2019. In the same year, Smith additionally re-adapted the plot of the film to the character of Mindy McCready / Hit-Girl in the Image comic book series Hit-Girl: The Golden Rage of Hollywood, with Dave Lizewski filling the role of Banky Edwards. A third film, titled Jay and Silent Bob: Store Wars, is in development.

== Plot ==
Dante Hicks and Randal Graves get a restraining order against Jay and Silent Bob, finally fed up with their drug dealing outside the strip mall where they work after Jay and Silent Bob tell a pair of teenagers that they were married in a Star Wars-themed wedding. Not allowed within 100 feet of the strip mall for at least a year, Jay and Silent Bob visit Brodie Bruce at his comic shop, where they learn that Miramax Films is adapting Bluntman and Chronic, the comic book based on their likenesses.

The pair visit Holden McNeil, co-creator and co-writer of Bluntman and Chronic, and demand that he give them their royalty money from the film, but Holden explains he sold his half of the rights to co-creator and artist Banky Edwards. Seeing the film's negative reception online, the pair set out for Hollywood to prevent the film from ruining their image, or at least to receive the royalties owed to them.

En route, they befriend an animal liberation group: Justice, Sissy, Missy, Chrissy, and Brent. The organization is a front; Brent is a patsy, who will free animals from a laboratory as a diversion while the girls rob a diamond depository. Jay throws Brent out of their van to get closer to Justice, to whom he is attracted. Justice is fond of the pair, but reluctantly accepts them as new patsies. While the girls steal the diamonds, Jay and Silent Bob free the animals, stealing an orangutan named Suzanne. They escape as the police arrive and the van explodes, believing the girls have perished.

Federal Wildlife Marshal Willenholly (whose name is taken from Will and Holly Marshall, the child characters on Land of the Lost) arrives at the crime scene; oblivious to the diamond heist, he claims jurisdiction due to the escaped animals, all of which have been recovered but Suzanne. The police find footage of a video Sissy made of Jay claiming to be "the clit commander", with "Clit" edited to be an acronym for the Coalition for the Liberation of Itinerant Tree-Dwellers. Willenholly declares the crime an act of terrorism and calls for backup to hunt "the two most dangerous men on the planet." He finds Jay and Silent Bob at a diner near Vasquez Rocks, and chases them into the sewer system of a nearby dam. Suzanne helps the duo in losing Willenholly by luring him off the dam, but is subsequently abducted by a Hollywood animal acting agency.

The duo then hitch a ride and arrive in Hollywood, and eventually, the Miramax lot. Chased by a team of security guards through the lot and several movie sets, including Good Will Hunting 2: Hunting Season, and reclaiming Suzanne from the set of Scream 4, Jay and Silent Bob end up in the dressing room of Jason Biggs and James Van Der Beek, the actors playing Bluntman and Chronic, respectively, in the film. Suzanne beats up the actors, knocking them out, and Jay and Silent Bob assume the roles while Van Der Beek and Biggs are arrested after getting mistaken for the duo.

Meeting the film's anti-white director Chaka Luther King, who mistakes them for Biggs and Van Der Beek's stunt doubles, Jay and Silent Bob are then escorted onto the set and forced to fight Mark Hamill, playing the supervillain of the film Cocknocker (a combination of Hamill's roles as The Joker, The Trickster, and Luke Skywalker) in a Star Wars-esque battle. Willenholly, armed with a shotgun, arrives to capture the pair, but Justice protects them, admitting the CLIT organization was only a diversion. The other thieves arrive and a climactic gun fight ensues. Jay and Silent Bob locate Banky and demand that he shut down production of the movie. Banky refuses on account of both the large sum of money Miramax offered him for the film and that the internet will continue to troll them regardless. Silent Bob then informs Banky that he violated their original likeness rights contract by selling the film rights of Bluntman and Chronic to Miramax without their permission, and therefore could face legal trouble if he withholds their royalties. Banky finally relents and agrees to give the duo half of his payment for the film.

Justice then turns herself and her former team in to Willenholly in exchange for a shorter sentence and dropping the charges on Jay and Silent Bob. The duo spend their royalty money locating everyone who mocked them, their characters, and the movie on the internet, including children and members of the clergy, and travel to assault them. The scene cuts to the El Rey theater, where a bunch of people exit, including Dante, Randal, Banky, Steve-Dave Pulski, Walt "The Fanboy" Grover, Willam Black, Hooper LaMonte, and sisters Alyssa and Tricia Jones, having just watched the Bluntman and Chronic movie, to poor reception. Jay and Silent Bob, accompanied by Justice and Willenholly (now an FBI agent), go across the street to enjoy the afterparty, featuring a performance from Morris Day and The Time.

After the credits, God (Dogma) closes the View Askewniverse book.

== Cast ==
- Jason Mewes as Jay/Chronic
- Kevin Smith as Silent Bob/Bluntman
- Ben Affleck as himself / Holden McNeil / Chuckie Sullivan / voice of Echo Base (Guard Over Radio)
- Jason Lee as Brodie Bruce / Banky Edwards
- Shannon Elizabeth as Justice
- Eliza Dushku as Sissy
- Ali Larter as Chrissy
- Jennifer Schwalbach as Missy
- Will Ferrell as Federal Wildlife Marshal Willenholly
- Matt Damon as himself / Will Hunting
- Brian O'Halloran as Dante Hicks
- Jeff Anderson as Randal Graves
- Judd Nelson as Sheriff
- George Carlin as Hitchhiker
- Carrie Fisher as Nun
- Seann William Scott as Brent
- Jon Stewart as Reg Hartner
- Tracy Morgan as Pumpkin Escobar
- Chris Rock as Chaka Luther King
- Jamie Kennedy as Chaka's production assistant
- Mark Hamill as himself / Cocknocker / voice of Scooby-Doo
- Marc Blucas as Fred lookalike
- Matthew James as Shaggy lookalike
- Jane Silvia as Velma lookalike
- Carmen Llywelyn as Daphne lookalike
- Diedrich Bader as Gordon, the Miramax security guard
- Bryan Johnson as Steve-Dave Pulasti
- Walter Flanagan as Walter "The Fanboy" Grover
- Scott Mosier as Willam Black / Good Will Hunting 2 assistant director
- Renee Humphrey as Tricia Jones
- Joey Lauren Adams as Alyssa Jones
- Dwight Ewell as Hooper LaMont/Hooper X
- Scott William Winters as himself / Clark
- William B. Davis (uncredited cameo) as The Smoking Man
- Joe Quesada (uncredited cameo) as Pizza Delivery Man
- Alanis Morissette (cameo) as God

Additionally, Wes Craven, Jules Asner, Steve Kmetko, Gus Van Sant, Jason Biggs, James Van Der Beek, Shannen Doherty, and Morris Day all appear as themselves.

== Production ==
The film's plot was heavily inspired by Chasing Dogma, a comic book miniseries that Smith wrote in 1998 and 1999 to explore events that happened in the Askewniverse between Chasing Amy and Dogma.

The film’s working title was originally View Askew 5 and the title was changed to Jay and Silent Bob Strike Back. It was Smith's first Miramax film to be made under their Dimension label, which was primarily known for releasing horror films. Filming began on January 14, 2001, and ended on April 19, 2001. Filming took in place in New Jersey, and mostly in California. The film featured a cameo from Smith's daughter Harley Quinn Smith, who he had in 1999 with his wife Jennifer Schwalbach Smith. Schwalbach Smith also appears in the film as one of the members of an all-female jewel thief gang.

On his podcast Jay & Silent Bob Get Old, Kevin Smith explained at length about how much of a "headache" the film was to make, mostly owing to Jason Mewes's drug and alcohol abuse turning him into a "ticking time bomb", which threatened to shut the project down at any moment. During pre-production, Mewes would have constant mood swings due to heroin withdrawal, to the point that Smith actually threw him out of his car on their way to the set one day. Mewes would compensate for his lack of drugs by drinking heavily after every day of shooting and nearly got into a fist fight with producer Scott Mosier when he had to come back one night for a re-shoot while drunk. When filming wrapped, Smith told Mewes point-blank to get sober or he would never speak to him again.

Originally during the scene with Scooby-Doo and the gang, after Jay and Silent Bob hit the bong in the Mystery Machine, there is a dream sequence where their smoke causes Scooby-Doo to get an erection. Scooby-Doo then tries to attack Jay, jumps on the windshield of the Mystery Machine, and then humps the van till he ejaculates on the windshield. Special makeup effects supervisor Vincent Guastini said the animatronic was finished and everything was rehearsed, but it had to be cut because "once the lawyers got wind of the sequence, it was not long before the scripted scenes were pared down".

== Release ==
=== Box office ===
Jay and Silent Bob Strike Back grossed $30.1 million in the United States and Canada, and $3.7 million in other territories, for a worldwide total of $33.8 million, against a production budget of $22 million.

The film grossed $11 million in its opening weekend, finishing third at the box office behind two other comedy sequels, American Pie 2 ($12.5 million) and Rush Hour 2 ($11.6 million).

=== Critical reception ===
On review aggregator Rotten Tomatoes, Jay and Silent Bob Strike Back has an approval rating of 52% based on 151 reviews, with an average rating of 5.60/10. The site's critical consensus reads: "Fans can expect a good laugh as the cast from Smith's previous films reunite for Jay and Silent Bob's last bow. The loose plotting and crude language may be too much for others though." On Metacritic the film has a weighted average score of 51 out of 100, based on 31 critics, indicating "mixed or average" reviews. Audiences surveyed by CinemaScore gave the film an average grade of "B+" on an A+ to F scale.

Roger Ebert gave the film three out of four stars, writing that "[w]hether you will like 'Jay and Silent Bob' depends on who you are ... Kevin Smith's movies are either made specifically for you, or specifically not made for you". Adam Smith of Empire gave the film 3/5 stars, writing that "[w]hen it's good it's very, very good, but when it's bad it's offensive", and noting that "the gag hit/miss ratio is really only about 50/50". Scott Tobias of The A.V. Club wrote that "[e]ven at a slim 95 minutes, Jay And Silent Bob lets initially funny scenes trail off into long-winded monologues and silly digressions", and Elvis Mitchell of The New York Times called the film "[may]be the greatest picture ever made for 14-year-old boys. Mr. Smith may have hit his target, but he aimed very low." In August 2001, Mike Schulz of River Cities' Reader wrote that, "for sheer laughs, both mindless and incredibly smart, nothing since 1997's Waiting for Guffman has even compared."

=== Home media ===
Jay and Silent Bob Strike Back was released on VHS and on a two-disc DVD set on February 26, 2002, by Dimension Home Video as a part of their "Dimension Collector's Series", presented in its original 2.35:1 widescreen aspect ratio. Among the bonus features on the DVD is an audio commentary by Smith, Mosier, and Mewes, 42 deleted, extended, and alternate scenes, music videos for Stroke 9's "Kick Some Ass" and Afroman's "Because I Got High", storyboards, a gag reel, a behind the scenes special, still galleries, cast and crew filmographies, and TV spots. A Blu-ray version of the film was released on September 19, 2006, with all features carried over from the DVD. As for 2020, the film's home media distribution has been handled by Paramount Pictures Home Entertainment following Paramount Global's purchase of 49% of Miramax (which includes Dimension Films' pre-2006 film and television catalog). Paramount subsequently reissued the film on DVD and Blu-ray in 2021, and have also made it available on their streaming service Paramount+.

== Soundtrack ==
Music from the Dimension Motion Picture Jay and Silent Bob Strike Back

Soundtrack album to the film Jay and Silent Bob Strike Back by Various artists
- Released: August 14, 2001
- Recorded: Various
- Genre: Various
- Length: 56:41
- Label: Universal
- Producers: Kevin Smith (exec.); Scott Mosier (exec.)

Singles from Music from the Dimension Motion Picture Jay and Silent Bob Strike Back
- 1. "Kick Some Ass" Released: August 2001; 2. "Because I Got High" Released: October 15, 2001

Professional ratings
Review scores
Source	Rating
AllMusic	4.5/5 stars

Music from the Dimension Motion Picture: Jay and Silent Bob Strike Back, the soundtrack to the film, was released on August 14, 2001, by Universal Records. Varèse Sarabande released the original score by James L. Venable. It alternates film dialogue with songs of various genres that appear in the film. It features the 2001 Afroman hit, "Because I Got High", whose music video featured the characters Jay and Silent Bob. "Tube Of Wonderful" was previously used as the theme song from Smith's 1997 film Chasing Amy.

=== Track listing ===
No.	Title	Writer(s)	Artist	Length
1.	"Interlude: Cue Music" (dialogue)	Kevin P. Smith	Jason Lee (as Brodie Bruce)	0:03
2.	"Jay's Rap 2001"	Kevin P. Smith (lyrics); James L. Venable (music)	Jason Mewes (as Jay)	0:32
3.	"Kick Some Ass"	Luke Esterkyn; Greg Gueldner; John McDermott; Eric Stock	Stroke 9	4:05
4.	"Holden on Affleck" (dialogue)	Kevin P. Smith	Ben Affleck (as Holden McNeil)	0:28
5.	"Tube of Wonderful"	Dave Pirner	Dave Pirner	1:45
6.	"Cyber Savvy" (dialogue)	Kevin P. Smith	Ben Affleck (as Holden McNeil) and Jason Mewes (as Jay)	0:07
7.	"Choked Up"	Ryan Adams	Minibar	2:58
8.	"Doobie Snacks" (dialogue)	Kevin P. Smith	Jason Mewes (as Jay)	0:08
9.	"Magic Carpet Ride"	John Kay; Rushton Moreve	Steppenwolf	2:43
10.	"Jay & Justice" (dialogue)	Kevin P. Smith	Shannon Elizabeth (as Justice) and Jason Mewes (as Jay)	0:11
11.	"Bad Medicine"	Jon Bon Jovi; Richie Sambora; Desmond Child	Bon Jovi	3:55
12.	"Stealing Monkeys" (dialogue)	Kevin P. Smith	Jason Mewes (as Jay)	0:09
13.	"This Is Love"	Polly Jean Harvey	PJ Harvey	3:45
14.	"Advice From Above" (dialogue)	Kevin P. Smith	Jason Mewes (as Jay)	0:23
15.	"The Devil's Song"	John Wozniak	Marcy Playground	2:52
16.	"Idiots vs. The Internet" (dialogue)	Kevin P. Smith	Jason Mewes (as Jay)	0:06
17.	"Tougher Than Leather"	Joseph Simmons; Darryl McDaniels; Jason Mizell; David "Davy D" Reeves	Run-D.M.C	4:23
18.	"Willenholly's Woe" (dialogue)	Kevin P. Smith	Will Ferrell (as Federal Wildlife Marshal Willenholly)	0:09
19.	"Bullets"	Bob Schneider	Bob Schneider	4:23
20.	"Touching a Brother's Heart" (dialogue)	Kevin P. Smith	Tracy Morgan (as Pumpkin Escobar) and Jason Mewes (as Jay)	0:23
21.	"Hiphopper"	Thomas Rusiak; Klas Ahlund; Joakim Ahlund; Patrik Arve	Thomas Rusiak featuring Teddybears STHLM	4:46
22.	"Two Thumbs Up" (dialogue)	Kevin P. Smith	Chris Rock (as Chaka Luther King)	0:07
23.	"Jackass"	Jimmy Pop	Bloodhound Gang	2:26
24.	"A Smooth Pimp and a Man Servant" (dialogue)	Kevin P. Smith	Jason Mewes (as Jay)	0:09
25.	"Jungle Love (Live)"	Prince Rogers Nelson; Morris Day; Jesse Johnson	Morris Day and The Time	3:03
26.	"NWP" (dialogue)	Kevin P. Smith	Chris Rock (as Chaka Luther King)	0:14
27.	"Because I Got High"	Joseph Foreman	Afroman	3:18
28.	"Stop Stealing Monkeys" (dialogue)	Kevin P. Smith	Will Ferrell (as Federal Wildlife Marshal Willenholly) and Jason Mewes (as Jay)	0:10
Total length:				56:41

== MPAA rating and GLAAD controversy ==
In August 2001, three weeks prior to release, the film came under fire from the Gay & Lesbian Alliance Against Defamation (GLAAD), for an alleged "overwhelmingly homophobic tone", which included an abundance of gay jokes and characters excessively using the term "gay" to mean something derogatory. The scenes deemed particularly offensive included Jay's vehement refusal of giving oral sex to a male driver when hitchhiking, and Jay chastising Silent Bob for being willing to perform fellatio on him to get the security guard to let them go. Following an advance screening of the film, former GLAAD media director Scott Seomin asked Smith to make a $10,000 donation to the Matthew Shepard Foundation, as well as to include a reference to GLAAD's cause in the ending credits. Roger Ebert responded to this controversy, writing: "GLAAD should give audiences credit for enough intelligence to know the difference between satire and bigotry."

On the bonus DVD, Smith explains in the on-camera intros of the deleted scenes that several scenes had to be cut from the theatrical release, due to the film initially receiving an NC-17 rating from the MPAA. He also mentions in the audio commentary of the feature film that it took three submissions to the MPAA for the film to finally earn an R rating.

== See also ==
- Hit-Girl: The Golden Rage of Hollywood, Smith's comic book re-adaptation of the concept.
- Oh, What a Lovely Tea Party, a documentary about the making of the film.
- Jay & Silent Bob Reboot, Smith's "requel" to the film.
- List of films featuring fictional films

== Notes ==
According to Ethan Alter of Film Journal International, Smith did not intend to make another View Askewniverse film upon completion of Jay and Silent Bob Strike Back, but only decided to do so several years later, following the unsuccessful release of Jersey Girl.

Will Ferrell would later star in the 2009 film adaptation of Land of the Lost as Dr. Rick Marshall alongside Danny McBride as Will Stanton and Anna Friel as Holly Cantrell.
