= Don't Move =

Don't Move may refer to:

- Don't Move (novel), a horror novel by James S. Murray and Darren Wearmouth
- Don't Move (2004 film), an Italian film directed by Sergio Castellitto
- Don't Move (2024 film), an American horror thriller film directed by Adam Schindler and Brian Netto
- Don't Move (2026 film), an American horror film directed by Maclain Nelson, based on the novel by James S. Murray and Darren Wearmouth.
- "Don't Move", a song by Phantogram from their 2011 EP Nightlife

== See also ==
- Don't Move Here
- Don't Move, Improve
