= James Murray (comedian) =

American comedian (born 1976)

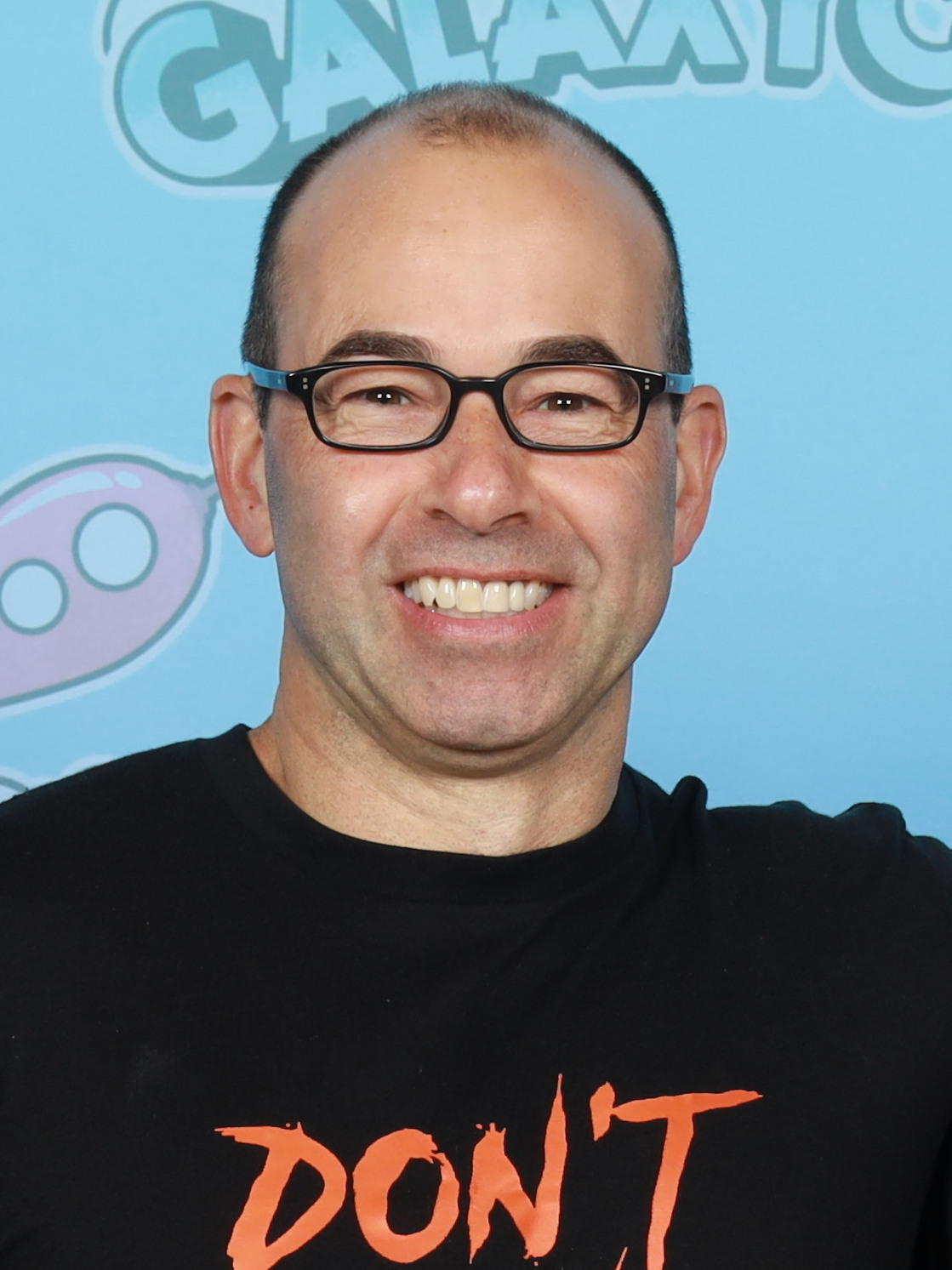
- Murray at GalaxyCon Oklahoma City in 2025
- Born: James Stephen Murray; May 1, 1976 (age 50); New York City, U.S.
- Education: Georgetown University (BA)
- Occupations: Comedian; actor; author
- Years active: 1997–present
- Spouses: Jenna Vulcano (m. 2014; ann. 2014) Melyssa Davies (m. 2020)
- James Murray's voice Murray explains Impractical Jokers during an interview in 2013.
- Website: jamesmurrayofficial.com

James Stephen "Murr" Murray (born May 1, 1976), is an American improvisational comedian, author, and actor. He is a member of the Tenderloins, a comedy troupe consisting of himself, Brian Quinn, Sal Vulcano, and formerly Joe Gatto. Along with Quinn and Vulcano, Murray stars in the television series Impractical Jokers, which first premiered in December 2011 on TruTV.

== Early life ==
James Stephen Murray was born on May 1, 1976, in Staten Island, New York City, where he was also raised. He is of Irish and Italian descent. He attended Monsignor Farrell High School in that borough, meeting his future comedy partners Joe Gatto, Brian Quinn, and Sal Vulcano in their freshman year. He graduated in 1994. Murray later graduated from Georgetown University, in Washington, D.C. As a child, he had a model railroad with his father.

== Career ==
=== Early career ===
In 1998, Murray produced, wrote, and directed a film titled Damned!, starring Jeremy Guskin as Jesus in an alternate retelling of the Bible. Rather than paying for a Ford Taurus, Murray's parents paid for the production of this film at his request.

After being apart for four years, Murray, Gatto, and Vulcano reunited after graduating from college and began practicing improvisation at Gatto's house, going on to tour as an improv & sketch comedy troupe in 1999, and calling themselves the Tenderloins.

The Tenderloins began producing comedy sketches together, posting them on YouTube, MySpace, and Metacafe, and subsequently accumulating millions of views online. In 2007, the troupe won the $100,000 grand prize in NBC's It's Your Show competition for the sketch "Time Thugs".

=== Impractical Jokers and other television shows ===
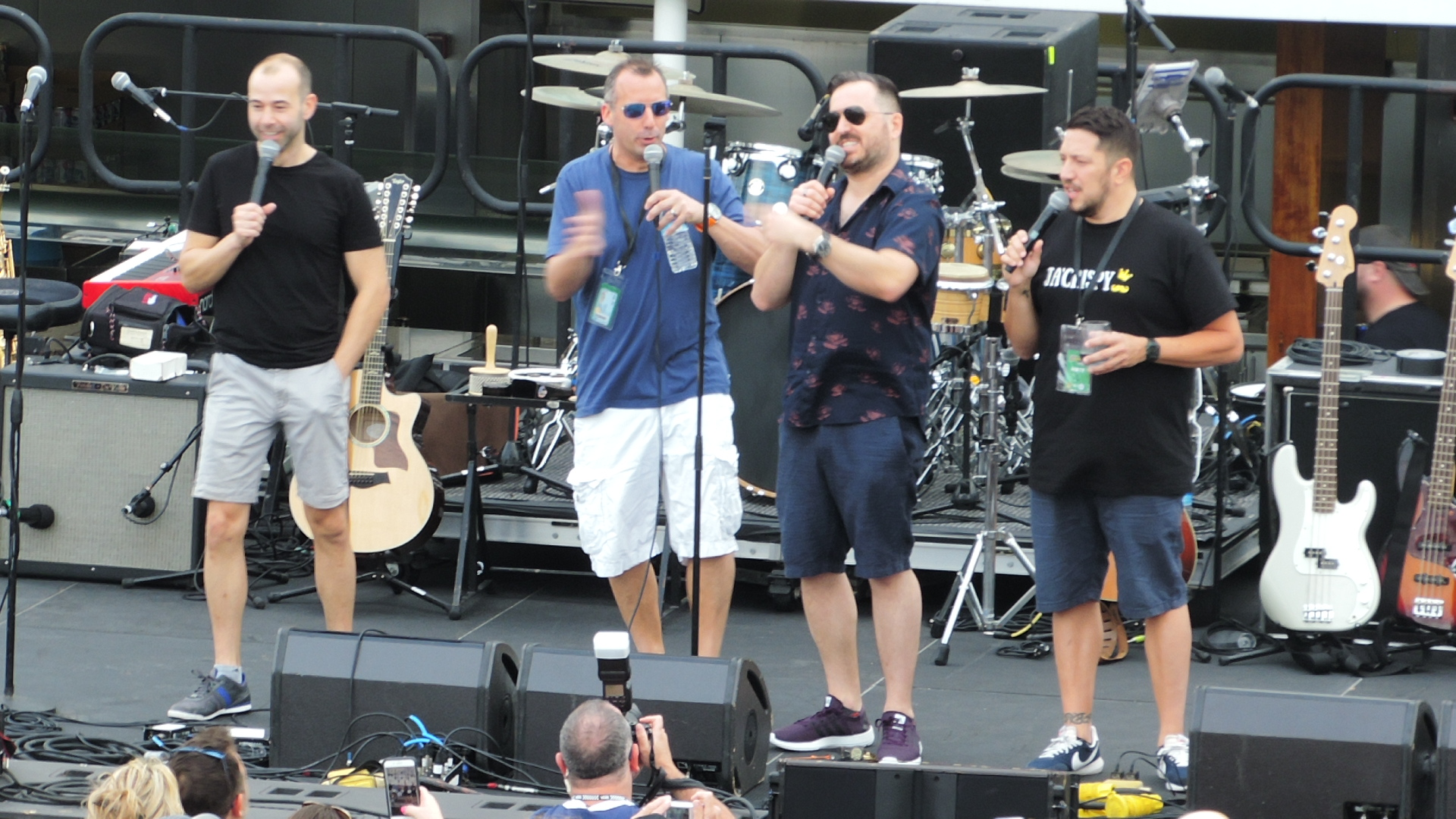
The Tenderloins performing in New Orleans in November 2017. From left to right: Murray, former member Joe Gatto, Brian Quinn, and Sal Vulcano.

Impractical Jokers premiered on December 15, 2011, on TruTV, and was watched by over 32 million viewers in its first season. The show has become the most popular series on TruTV.

Since 2012 Murray has been a part of the Impractical Jokers Live tours.

In October 2019, Murray, along with the other members of the Tenderloins, starred in The Misery Index, which is hosted by Jameela Jamil and is based on Andy Breckman's card game "Shit Happens".

Impractical Jokers: The Movie was released on February 21, 2020. It concluded on March 20, 2025, marking a transition for the show as it moved exclusively to TBS. Murray remains a primary cast member, and Season 12 has been officially confirmed for release in 2026.

He made a cameo appearance in the film Clerks III, released in 2022. He served as an executive producer for the 2025 TV special Foul Play With Anthony Davis. On the February 10, 2023, episode of AEW Rampage, Murray and Brian Quinn appeared in a segment where they were beaten down by Chris Jericho and the Jericho Appreciation Society.

=== Other ventures ===
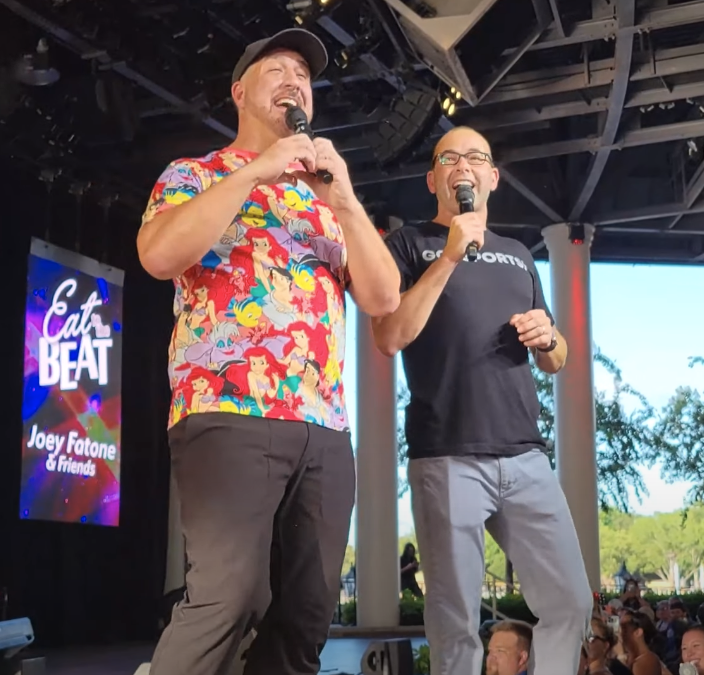
Murray (right) and Joey Fatone (left) at the 2022 Epcot International Food & Wine Festival

Murray worked at NorthSouth Productions, where he was the senior vice president of development, leaving in February 2018.

In 2018, he released a sci-fi/horror novel entitled Awakened, which was co-written by Darren Wearmouth, and revolves around the discovery of an intensely hostile race of intelligent, methane-breathing monsters living beneath the New York City Subway and the sinister Foundation for Human Advancement - an almost equally cruel and ruthless organization dedicated to the destruction of that race through world domination. The book became a #1 Sunday Times Best Seller. A sequel, called The Brink, was released in June 2019.

In October 2020, Murray and Wearmouth co-wrote another horror novel, Don't Move, which follows a group of campers being hunted by a giant arachnid.

In July 2021, they published a thriller, The Stowaway, about a serial killer on board a cruise ship. In March 2022, Murray wrote the middle-grade novel Area 51 Interns: Alien Summer with author Carsen Smith, the first novel in the Area 51 Interns series. The series is about a girl named Viv Harlow, whose parents work at Area 51, and how while she and her friends are here they must stop evil aliens from taking over the world. The second book in the series, Zoned Out, was released later that same year, and the third installment, Time Chasers, was released in October 2023.

His most recent work, You Better Watch Out, follows a group of people being tracked down by a killer.

In 2021, Murray began a solo standup tour, Murr Live. The family-friendly show consists of stories relating to the TV show, videos, and hidden camera challenges, and includes audience participation.

On October 21, 2024, The Hollywood Reporter announced that Murray's book Don't Move was being adapted into a feature film, and that principal photography had wrapped in Kansas City, Missouri, on October 18, 2024. Murray is a co-producer for the film, and it is set to be released theatrically on September 11, 2026.

== Personal life ==
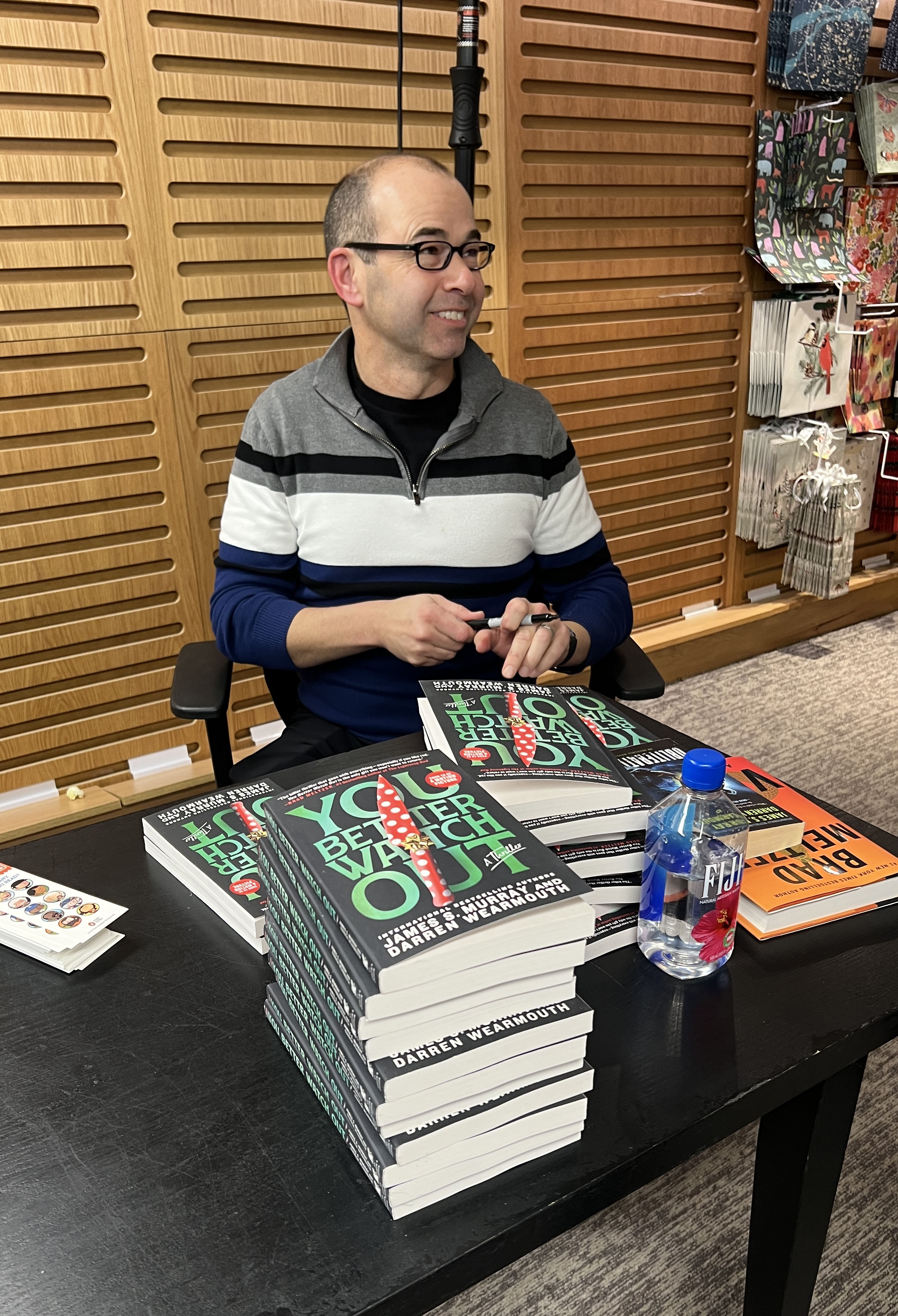
Murray at a January 2026 book signing for his thriller You Better Watch Out at a Barnes & Noble in Manhattan

=== Relationships ===
As of November 2022, Murray resides in Princeton, New Jersey.

On March 13, 2014, Murray jokingly, yet legally, married Sal Vulcano's sister, Jenna Vulcano, as a result of Vulcano's punishment in the season 3 finale, "Brother-in-Loss"; they had the marriage annulled shortly thereafter.

In July 2019, Murray became engaged to Melyssa Davies, whom he met at his launch party for his book Awakened. The couple married on September 25, 2020.

In June 2025, Murray bought a house that hosts a model railroad club, the Pacific Southern Railway. The house hosts Murray's wife's candle business and Alzheimer's charity, while the model train club resides in the basement.

=== Beliefs and interests ===
Murray has been a Kentucky Colonel since June 15, 2016. On June 9, 2024, Murray served as the Grand Marshall of the 2024 Toyota/Save Mart 350 race.

Murray stated in a 2014 interview that he doesn’t believe in prayer or God. Two years later during his Brow Beaten punishment in 2016 however, Murr revealed himself as a sponsor for his nephew’s Confirmation.

His interests include traveling, hiking, and kayaking.

== Filmography ==
=== Film ===
Year	Title	Role	Notes
1997	Private Parts	Student	Uncredited
1998	Damned!	Judas Iscariot	Also director, producer, and writer
2017	Return to Return to Nuke 'Em High AKA Volume 2	Chuck Flingus	
2017	Christmas Time	Dr. Murphy	
2020	Impractical Jokers: The Movie	Himself	Also writer
2026	Don't Move	Booth attendant (cameo)	Producer

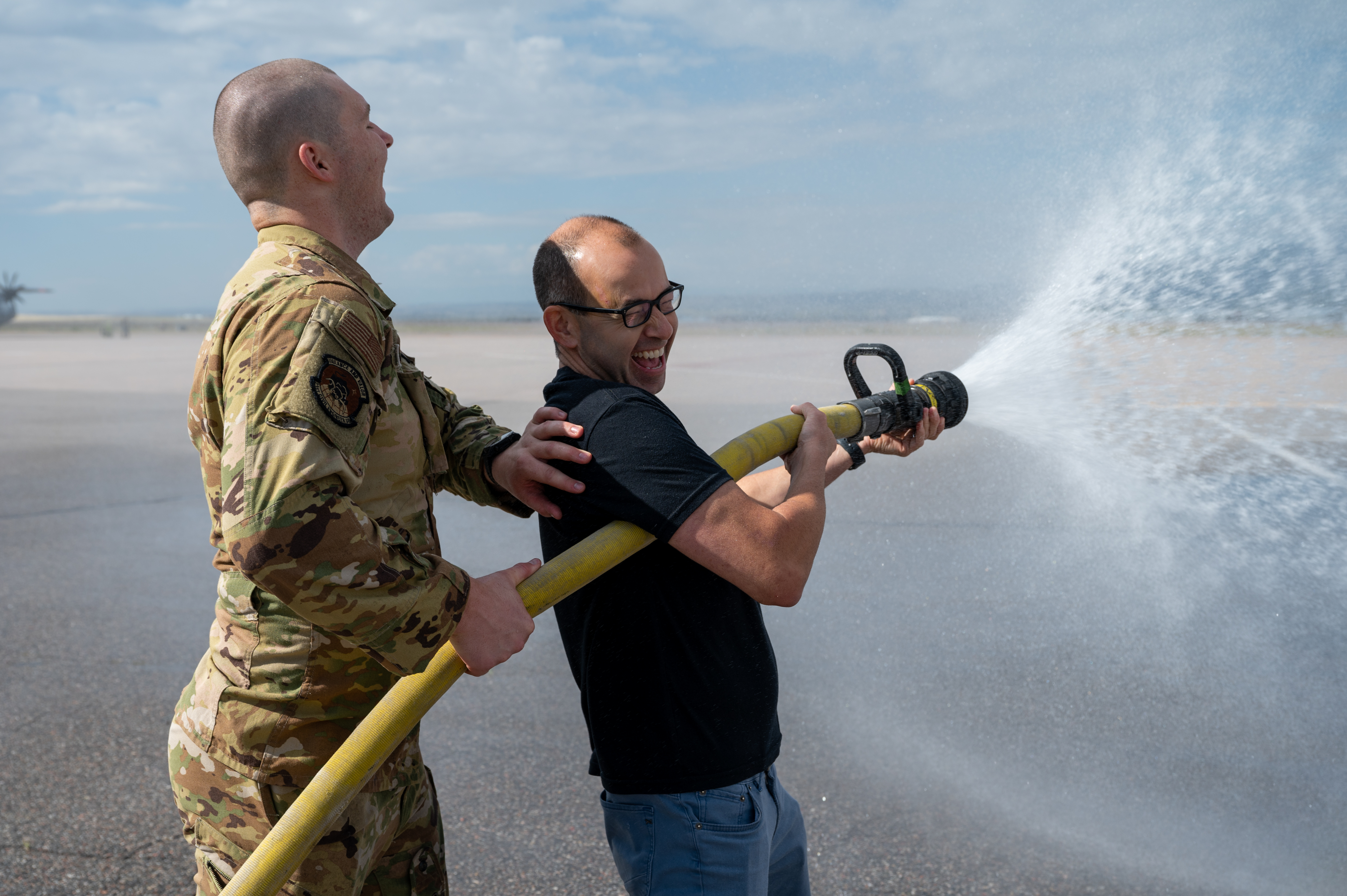
Murray at Peterson Space Force Base in Colorado, U.S. in 2023

=== Television ===
Year	Title	Role	Notes
2009	The Tenderloins	Himself	Television film; also writer
2011–present	Impractical Jokers	Himself	Main cast (294 episodes); also executive producer and producer
2015	Bones	Murray	Episode: "The Senator in the Street Sweeper"
2016	12 Monkeys	Desk Clerk	Episode: "Bodies of Water"
2017	Drunk History: UK	Drunk Storyteller	Episode: "Billy the Kid/Elizabeth I"
2017	Impractical Jokers: After Party	Himself	Main cast (26 episodes)
2018	The Last Sharknado: It's About Time	Eastwood	Television film
2018–2020	Gods of Medicine	Todd James	3 episodes
2019–2021	The Misery Index	Himself	Main cast (50 episodes)
2020	MacGyver	Maître d'	Episode: "Mac + Desi + Riley + Aubrey"
2020	Loafy	Himself	Voice role, 2 episodes
2020	Nickelodeon's Unfiltered	Himself	Episode: "Hot Dog Dance Party!"
2020–2021	Impractical Jokers: Dinner Party	Himself	Main cast (18 episodes)
2021	Down to Business	Himself	Episode: "Down to Laugh"

=== Web series ===
Year	Title	Role	Notes
2020	Pitch Meeting	Himself	Episode: "Birds of Prey Pitch Meeting"

== Bibliography ==
Awakened series (with Darren Wearmouth)

- Awakened (2018)
- The Brink (2019)
- Obliteration (2020)

Area 51 Interns series (with Carsen Smith)

- Alien Summer (2022)
- Zoned Out (2022)
- Time Chasers (2023)

Other novels

- Don't Move (2020) (with Darren Wearmouth)
- The Stowaway (2021) (with Darren Wearmouth)
- You Better Watch Out (2024) (with Darren Wearmouth)

== Accolades ==
Year	Award	Nominee / work	Category	Result
2019	Shorty Awards	Himself	Best in Literature	Nominated
