= Chris Henchy =

American film director, film producer, and screenwriter

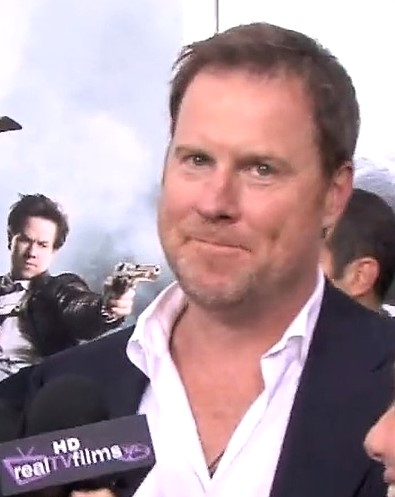
- Henchy in 2010, promoting The Other Guys
- Born: Christopher Thomas Henchy; March 23, 1964 (age 62); New York City, U.S.
- Education: University of New Mexico (B.S.)
- Occupations: Film director, film producer, screenwriter
- Spouse: Brooke Shields (m. 2001)
- Children: 2

Christopher Thomas Henchy (born March 23, 1964) is an American film director, film producer, and screenwriter. He is a creative collaborator with Will Ferrell, co-creating the website Funny or Die and writing several Ferrell films, including Land of the Lost, The Other Guys and The Campaign.

== Early life ==
Henchy was born on March 23, 1964, in New York City, to Patricia and Michael Henchy, Ret. Col. He was raised in Augusta, Georgia, and attended Saint Mary on the Hill Catholic School. Henchy graduated from Friendswood High School. He attended the University of New Mexico, where he received a B.S. degree in finance and was a member of the Sigma Alpha Epsilon chapter.

== Career ==
After graduation, Henchy moved to New York City and worked on Wall Street. He later left his job and decided to work in comedy. Henchy was hired by MTV and later wrote monologue jokes for Garry Shandling's The Larry Sanders Show.

Henchy went on to write for Campus Cops in 1996. After writing for a few television specials and some guest-writing stints on series, he created and produced the television series Battery Park in 2000, which starred Elizabeth Perkins.

Henchy was a writer and producer for television sitcoms Spin City and Life with Bonnie. He created the sitcom I'm with Her with Marco Pennette, which was loosely based on Henchy's relationship with wife Brooke Shields. The show was cancelled by ABC after one season. Henchy later became the co-executive producer of Entourage and a producer on HBO's Eastbound & Down. He, along with Will Ferrell and Adam McKay, created the website Funny or Die. Henchy produced The Goods: Live Hard, Sell Hard. He is credited as a writer of the 2009 film Land of the Lost, The Other Guys and The Campaign which he also co-produced. In 2018, Henchy was announced to be directing a feature-length film for the television series Impractical Jokers with production work by Funny or Die. It was released in February 2020 under the name Impractical Jokers: The Movie. Henchy produced Eurovision Song Contest: The Story of Fire Saga along with writing and directing two benefit concerts at the Greek Theatre for Ferrell titled "Will Ferrell's Best Night of Your Life".

== Personal life ==
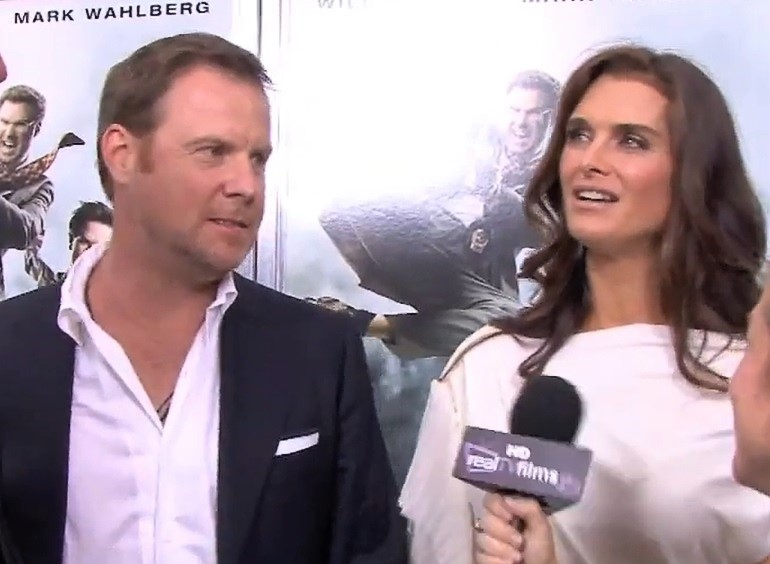
Henchy and Shields in 2010

Henchy met actress Brooke Shields in 1999 on the Warner Bros lot. They became engaged in July 2000 while on vacation in Mexico and got married on April 4, 2001. They have two daughters, Rowan Henchy and Grier Henchy. They reside in Greenwich Village, New York City.
