= Impractical Jokers: The Movie =

2020 comedy film directed by Chris Henchy

- Theatrical release poster
- Directed by: Chris Henchy
- Written by: Chris Henchy; Joe Gatto; James Murray; Brian Quinn; Sal Vulcano
- Based on: Impractical Jokers by The Tenderloins
- Produced by: Jim Ziegler; Buddy Enright; Chris Henchy; Joe Gatto; James Murray; Brian Quinn; Sal Vulcano
- Starring: James Murray; Brian Quinn; Sal Vulcano; Joe Gatto; Paula Abdul; Casey Jost; Jaden Smith
- Edited by: Thomas M. Vogt
- Music by: Leo Birenberg; Paul Jones; Zach Robinson; BigBang
- Production companies: Funny or Die; truTV; Lotte Entertainment
- Distributed by: Warner Bros. Pictures; CJ Entertainment (international)
- Release date: February 21, 2020
- Running time: 93 minutes
- Country: United States
- Language: English
- Budget: $3 million
- Box office: $10.7 million

Impractical Jokers: The Movie is a 2020 reality road comedy film directed by Chris Henchy, based on the truTV television series Impractical Jokers. The film stars Brian Quinn, James Murray, Sal Vulcano, and Joe Gatto, also known as The Tenderloins. It was theatrically released on February 21, 2020. The film received generally unfavorable reviews, but grossed $10 million against a budget of $3 million.

== Plot ==
In 1994 Staten Island, a group of four teenage friends, Joe Gatto, Sal Vulcano, James Murray and Brian Quinn sneak into a Paula Abdul concert disguised as security personnel. However, they accidentally ruin the concert after Joe jumps out on stage and poorly acts as a hype man. The outcome embarrasses them and angers Abdul, who delivers a clothesline blow to Sal and vows to get her revenge on the quartet. However, the incident inspires them to do impractical joke challenges as a comedy gimmick.

Twenty-five years later, in 2019, the four became celebrities as a result of their TV show, Impractical Jokers, but were surprised to see Abdul at a Red Lobster. Abdul approaches but admits she is a huge fan and invites them to a party in Miami. However, shortly after Paula leaves, the group realizes she gave them only three tickets instead of four, meaning that one person cannot go. To decide who will be left out, they decide to road trip to Miami using Q's Crown Vic while competing with each other in hidden-camera challenges; the one who loses will not get the ticket.

Some of the significant challenges include: reading a eulogy to folks outside the Lincoln Memorial in Washington, D.C. and getting the listeners' approval; on a boat ride near Myrtle Beach in the Carolina coast, convincing passengers not to pick up someone in distress; getting roadside assistance from strangers; and interviewing for a staff job with the Atlanta Hawks while being fed silly actions and lines by the others. Individual challenges and pranks also arise. Sal gets locked in a motel room with a chained white tiger. Q must ride a horse while wearing a gladiator uniform to meet the others. Murr visits a club with scantily-clad women, only to be surprised by his family wishing him happy birthday behind a two-way mirror. Joe dresses like a cave troll to surprise a tour group. Q gives a presentation at a social media conference, but the videotape footage includes a bit of his real parents acting out lead-in scenes of softcore porn. Sal attends a fan party featuring Jaden Smith, dressed as Jaden's number-one fan. He shows off his tattoo of Smith from a previous season, but Smith has Sal get an updated one on his other thigh.

When they arrive in Miami, Murr becomes the loser, so he has to stay behind while the others go to the party until he decides to sneak into the show using the same security disguise from 1994. This results in Abdul recognizing them from when they crashed her concert 25 years ago. Sal gets tasered, but Joe hypes the crowd into cheering for them. The next day, with Joey Fatone in the background at Miami Beach, Joe tells the Jokers that he received an offer to go on tour with Abdul as a hype man, but turned it down. Since Murr snuck into the party, the others subject him to one last punishment: Joe, Q, and Sal fly back to Staten Island on a private jet, while Murr rides harnessed to the top wing of a stunt plane.

== Cast ==
- James Murray as Himself
- Brian Quinn as Himself
- Sal Vulcano as Himself
- Joe Gatto as Himself
- Paula Abdul as Herself
- Jaden Smith as Himself
- Joey Fatone as Himself
- Kane Hodder as Paula Abdul's bodyguard
- Will Ferrell as Miami Restaurant Guy #4
- Casey Jost as Samuel "Sam"

== Production ==
The film was produced by The Tenderloins, Chris Henchy (who also served as the director), Buddy Enright and Funny or Die's Jim Ziegler. The film was executively produced by Mike Farah and Joe Farrell of Funny or Die, Marissa Ronca, Chris Linn & Jack Rovner. Henchy said that he had first heard of the Tenderloins group as his daughters were watching the Impractical Jokers TV show, and was contacted by his agent about two weeks later with an offer to direct the film.

Principal photography for the film began in May 2018, in New York. The cinematographers used professional sound and video quality unlike the TV show to make the movie have a better aesthetic. Filming concluded on June 5, 2018.

== Release ==
On September 20, 2019, it was announced that the film would be released in 2020 through WarnerMedia. In December, TruTV released a trailer and announced a February 21, 2020 release in select theaters.

Initially intended to be released digitally in late 2020, TruTV released the film on April 1, 2020, due to nationwide shutdown of theaters amid the coronavirus pandemic in the United States. The film has also become available on HBO Max since being released on the service on September 1, 2020.

== Reception ==
=== Box office ===
The film made $2.6 million from 357 theaters in its opening weekend. The film was added to 1,543 theaters in its second weekend and made $3.5 million, finishing seventh.

=== Critical response ===
On Rotten Tomatoes, the film holds an approval rating of 35% based on 26 reviews, with an average rating of 4.6/10. On Metacritic, the film has a weighted average score of 39 out of 100, based on five critics, indicating "generally unfavorable" reviews.

Mark Keizer of Variety called it "an undistinguished and unnecessary extension of a brand whose primary attributes are likability, authenticity and relative modesty (given the worst impulses of the genre)." John DeFore of The Hollywood Reporter questioned why anyone "would get off the couch and spend money" to see this film.

Film critique Nick Allen gave the film an average review rating it 2 stars out of 4.
