= Don't Move (novel) =

2020 horror novel by James S. Murray and Darren Wearmouth

- Author: James S. Murray; Darren Wearmouth
- Language: English
- Genre: Horror; Thriller
- Publisher: Blackstone Publishing
- Publication date: October 2020
- Media type: Print / digital
- ISBN: 978-1-982678-32-6

Don't Move is a horror novel written by James S. Murray and Darren Wearmouth. Published in 2020 by Blackstone Publishing, the story follows a widow named Megan Forrester who embarks on a camping trip with members of a local church. After becoming stranded in a West Virginian forest, they find themselves stalked by a giant prehistoric arachnid that hunts by sensing vibrations.

== Development ==
Author James S. Murray, known for starring in the American television series Impractical Jokers as a member of a comedy troupe known as the Tenderloins, wrote the novel while self-isolating at his home in Princeton, New Jersey during the COVID-19 pandemic. He co-wrote the book with Darren Wearmouth, who previously collaborated with Murray on the Awakened series.

== Film adaptation ==
On October 21, 2024, The Hollywood Reporter announced Don't Move had been adapted into a feature film and that principal photography had concluded in Kansas City, Missouri, on October 18, 2024. The movie stars Lyndsy Fonseca, Russ Vitale, Tom Cavanagh, Rob Riggle, Hunter King, and Joseph Lee Anderson.

James S. Murray and David M. Wulf produced the film and Maclain Nelson directed the film from a script he co-wrote with Murray and Wearmouth.

== Reception ==
A reviewer writing for iHorror concluded that "Murray and Wearmouth succeed at creating a bold page-turner that will keep you on the edge of your seat from the very first chapter to its terrifying end."
