= Sal Vulcano =

American comedian (born 1976)

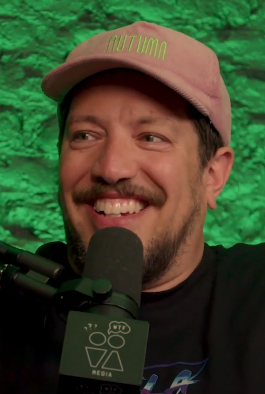
- Vulcano in April 2023
- Born: Salvatore Edward Anthony Vulcano; November 6, 1976 (age 50); New York City, U.S.
- Education: St. John's University (BS)
- Occupations: Comedian; actor
- Years active: 1998–present
- Spouse: Francesca Muffaletto (m. 2019)
- Children: 2
- Sal Vulcano's voice Vulcano talking about bugs on a podcast in 2023
- Website: salvulcanocomedy.com

Salvatore Edward Anthony Vulcano (born November 6, 1976) is an American improvisational and stand-up comedian, actor, and producer. He is a member of The Tenderloins, a comedy troupe consisting of himself, James Murray, Brian Quinn, and formerly Joe Gatto. Along with Murray and Quinn, Vulcano stars in the television series Impractical Jokers, which first premiered in December 2011, on TruTV.

== Early life ==
Salvatore Edward Anthony Vulcano was born on November 6, 1976 on Staten Island, and is of Italian, Cuban, and Puerto Rican descent. He attended Monsignor Farrell High School; along with Gatto, Murray, and Quinn, he was a member of his high school's Improvisation Club. He received his undergraduate degree in finance from St. John's University in 1998.

== Career ==
=== Early career ===
After being apart for four years, Murray, Gatto, and Vulcano reunited after graduating from college and began practicing improvisation at Gatto's house, going on to tour as an improv and sketch comedy troupe in 1999, calling themselves The Tenderloins.

The Tenderloins began producing comedy sketches together, posting them on YouTube, MySpace, and Metacafe, accumulating millions of views online. In 2007, the troupe won the $100,000 grand prize in the NBC "It's Your Show" competition for the sketch "Time Thugs".

=== Impractical Jokers and other television shows ===
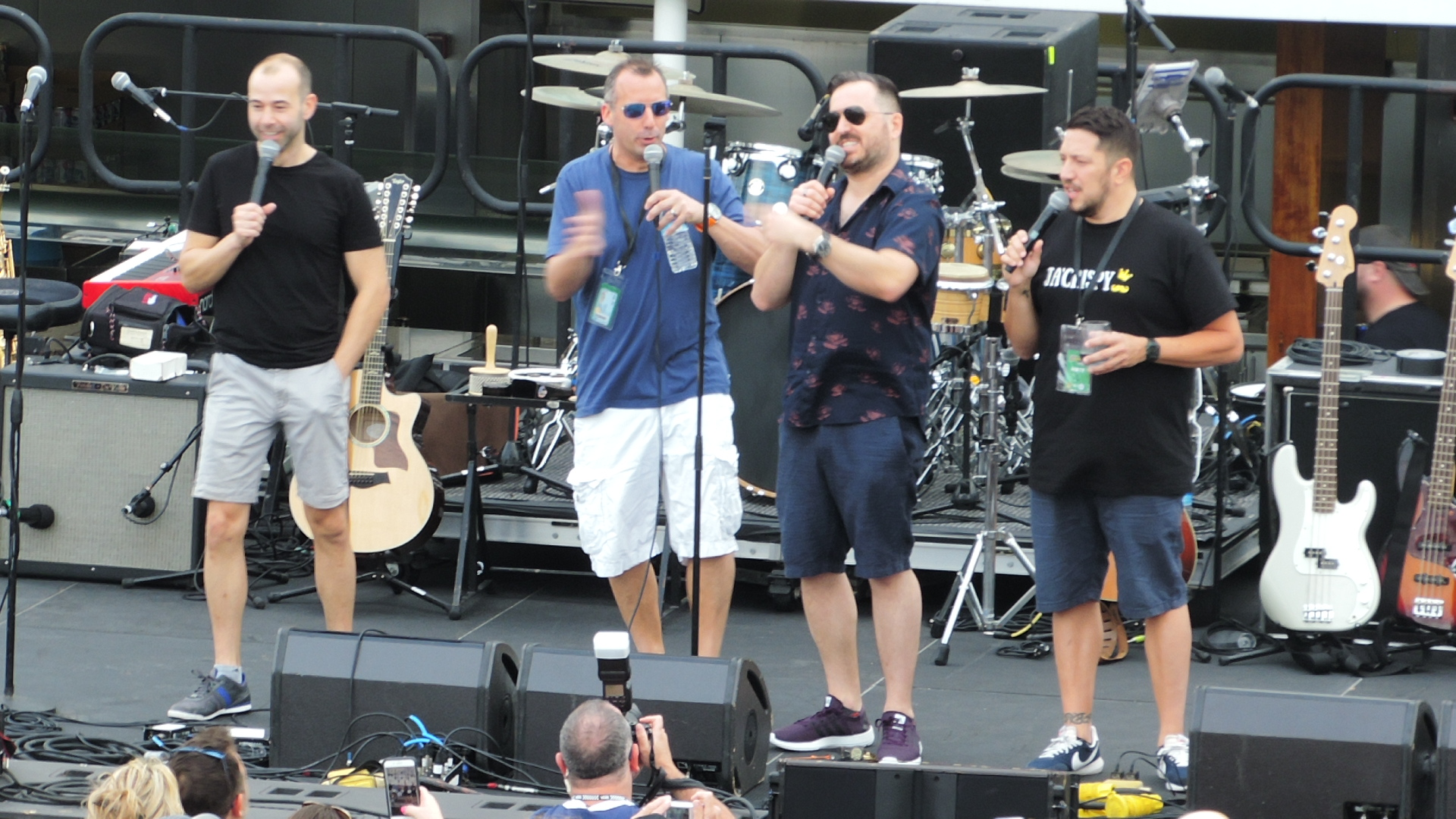
The Tenderloins performing in New Orleans in November 2017. From left to right: James Murray, former member Joe Gatto, Brian Quinn, and Vulcano.

Impractical Jokers premiered on December 15, 2011, on TruTV, which was watched by over 32 million viewers in its first season. The show became the most popular series on TruTV and boosted Vulcano into popularity. As of November 2017, Vulcano was the most punished Joker on the show. In season 3, episode 26 "The Permanent Punishment", Quinn, Murray and Vulcano lost and had to get a tattoo of Gatto's choice. Vulcano was given a Jaden Smith tattoo, which became a running gag for the show. In October 2019, Vulcano, along with the other members of The Tenderloins, starred in The Misery Index, which is hosted by Jameela Jamil and is based on Andy Breckman's card game "Shit Happens." The series was renewed for a third season.

In August 2019, Vulcano appeared as the celebrity guest on episode 2 of Straight Up Steve Austin.

In February 2021, as a result of a punishment on the show, Vulcano was renamed to Prince Herb for the rest of the season 9 as well as in all his media appearances. The punishment episode aired on April 29, 2021. However, after Gatto left the show in December 2021, the Prince Herb alias was dropped by Vulcano, and in the first episode without Gatto, aired on April 2, 2022, the other Jokers officially retired the moniker.

In June 2022, Vulcano appeared in season 1, episode 9, "Babysitting Lemurs", of Would I Lie to You?. He also appeared in season 4, episode 5 of the show What We Do in the Shadows.

Vulcano made a cameo appearance in the 2022 film Clerks III. He served as an executive producer for the 2025 TV special Foul Play with Anthony Davis.

In January 2026, Vulcano appeared as a guest on season two episode seven of Everything on the Menu with Braun Strowman.

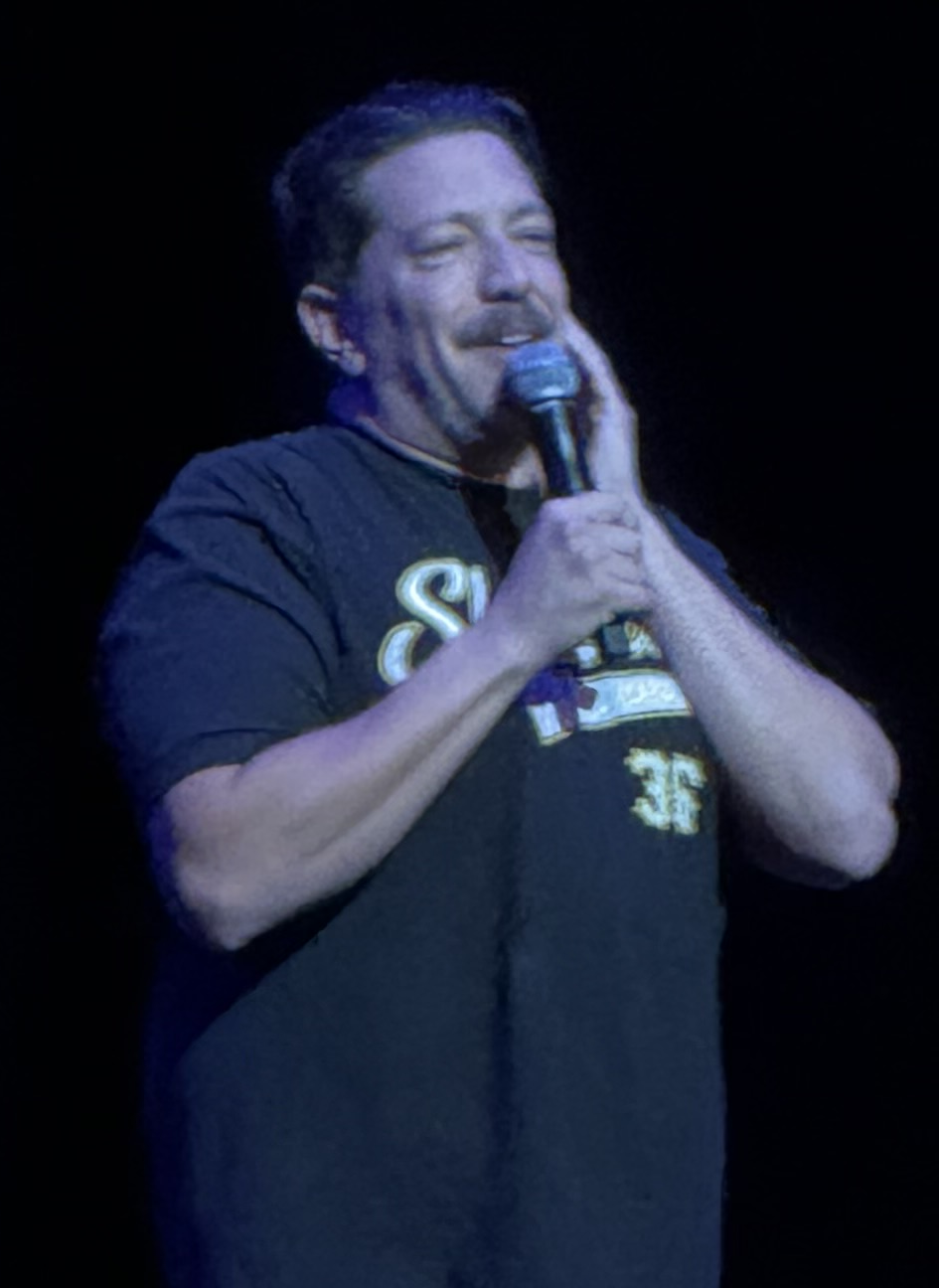
Vulcano in October 2025

=== What Say You? podcast ===
What Say You?, an occasional podcast hosted by Vulcano and Quinn, was named Best New Show at the 2013 Stitcher Awards. The increased popularity of What Say You sparked a friendly competition among the friends, spurring Gatto and Murray to release their own Tenderloins podcast without the other two members. In 2015, What Say You? was nominated for the Comedy, Entertainment, and Best Produced Podcast Awards at the 10th Annual Podcast Awards. They have stated that the podcast is their own side project, not a replacement of The Tenderloins Podcast. The group explained that it was difficult to coordinate the schedules of all four members outside of work, making it challenging to produce their troupe's official podcast with any regularity.

=== Hey Babe! podcast ===
Vulcano has collaborated with fellow comedian and friend Chris Distefano on a podcast called Hey Babe! (alternatively titled Sal and Chris Present: Hey Babe!) in recent years.

=== Stand up career ===
Vulcano has been a part of live Impractical Jokers performance tours since 2012. He has also started doing solo tours, and on May 31, 2024, he released his first full-length stand-up special, Terrified, via 800 Pound Gorilla’s production.

== Personal life ==
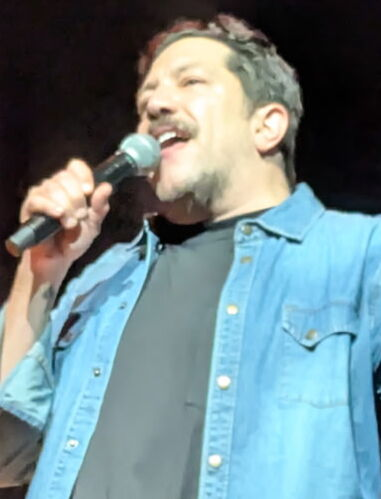
Vulcano performing in January 2026

On an episode of Impractical Jokers, Vulcano said that he was hit by a car at the age of four.

Vulcano has two tattoos of Jaden Smith: one on his left thigh which he received as a punishment on the show, and an updated portrait on his right thigh which he received as part of a segment in Impractical Jokers: The Movie.

On March 13, 2014, Vulcano's Impractical Jokers costar James Murray jokingly, yet legally, married Vulcano's sister, Jenna Vulcano, as a result of Vulcano's punishment in the season 3 finale, "Brother-in-Loss"; they annulled the marriage shortly after.

In May 2024, Vulcano appeared on Theo Von's podcast This Past Weekend, where he revealed that he had married his long-time girlfriend, Francesca Muffaletto, and had a 20-month-old daughter with her. In October 2025, Vulcano revealed on Ryan Sickler’s podcast that he and his wife had had another child together, a 10-month-old son.

A certified ordained minister, Vulcano officiated former Tenderloins member Joe Gatto's wedding.

Vulcano has been a member of the Honorable Order of Kentucky Colonels since June 15, 2016.

Vulcano is a New York Yankees fan and a pro wrestling fan. He made an appearance on the pre-show of WWE's WrestleMania 35.

== Filmography ==
Year(s)	Title	Role	Info
1998	Damned!	Lawn Mower Boy	
2007	Just Another Romantic Wrestling Comedy	Pinky	
2011–present	Impractical Jokers	Himself	Main cast (294 episodes); also producer
2015	Bones	Sal	Episode: "The Senator in the Street Sweeper"
2017	Drunk History	Himself	Episode: "Alexander Graham Bell & James Garfield/The Dambusters"
2017	12 Monkeys	Officer Sal	Episode: "Causality"
2017–2021	Impractical Jokers: After Party	Himself	Main cast (14 episodes)
2019–2021	The Misery Index	Himself	Main cast (50 episodes)
2019	Straight Up Steve Austin	Himself	Episode: "Sal Vulcano"
2020	Impractical Jokers: The Movie	Himself	
2020	MacGyver	Chef Salvatore	Episode: "Mac + Desi + Riley + Aubrey"
2020	Loafy	Himself	Voice role, 2 episodes
2020–2021	Impractical Jokers: Dinner Party	Himself	Main cast (18 episodes)
2020–2021	Bless the Harts	Bear Vulcano	2 episodes
2022	What We Do in the Shadows	Himself	Episode: "Private School"
2022	Clerks III	Auditioner	
2022	Would I Lie to You?	Himself	Episode: "Babysitting Lemurs"
2024	Terrified	Himself	Television special
2026	Everything on the Menu with Braun Strowman	Himself	Episode: "The Monster in Manhattan"
