= Straight Up Steve Austin =

Reality television program

- Genre: Reality television
- Presented by: "Stone Cold" Steve Austin
- Country of origin: United States
- Original language: English
- No. of seasons: 2
- No. of episodes: 15

Production
- Camera setup: Multicamera setup
- Running time: 30 minutes

Original release
- Network: USA Network
- Release: August 12, 2019 – March 8, 2021

Related
- WWE Raw

Straight Up Steve Austin is an American reality television series that airs on USA Network hosted by "Stone Cold" Steve Austin. Premiering after Monday Night Raw on August 12, 2019. The series follows Austin and a celebrity guest as they travel across the country, swapping stories about their lives and careers.

On January 10, 2020, the series was renewed for a second season, which premiered on January 11, 2021.

== Episodes ==
Season	Episodes	Originally released	
Season	Episodes	First released	Last released
1	7	August 12, 2019	September 17, 2019
2	8	January 11, 2021	March 8, 2021

=== Season 1 (2019) ===
No. overall	No. in season	Title	Original release date	U.S. viewers (millions)
1	1	"Rob Riggle"	August 12, 2019	1.211
2	2	"Sal Vulcano"	August 19, 2019	1.078
3	3	"Baker Mayfield"	August 26, 2019	0.978
4	4	""The Man" Becky Lynch"	September 2, 2019	1.097
5	5	"Gabriel Iglesias"	September 9, 2019	0.841
6	6	"Trace Adkins"	September 16, 2019	0.848
7	7	"Dale Earnhardt Jr."	September 17, 2019	0.848

=== Season 2 (2021) ===
No. overall	No. in season	Title	Original release date	U.S. viewers (millions)
8	1	"Luke Combs"	January 11, 2021	0.598
9	2	"Ice-T"	January 18, 2021	0.698
10	3	"Tiffany Haddish"	January 25, 2021	0.703
11	4	"Brett Favre"	February 8, 2021	0.603
12	5	"Steve-O"	February 15, 2021	0.526
13	6	"Bert Kreischer"	February 22, 2021	0.360
14	7	"Joel McHale"	March 1, 2021	0.644
15	8	""The Queen" Charlotte Flair"	March 8, 2021	0.753
