= The Tenderloins =

Comedy troupe

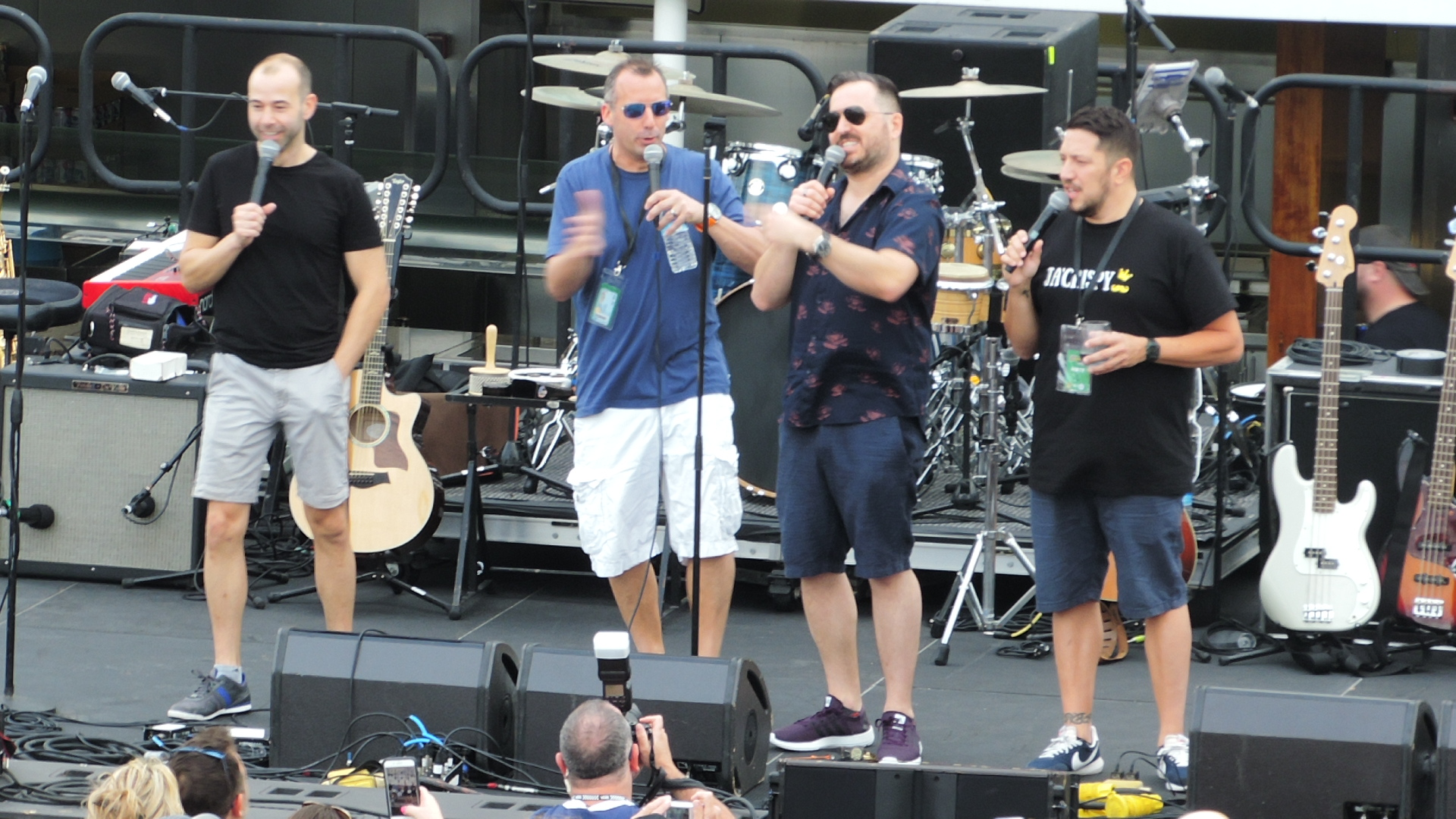
- The Tenderloins at New Orleans in 2017; From left to right: James Murray, Joe Gatto, Brian Quinn, and Sal Vulcano
- Notable work: Impractical Jokers; The Misery Index

Comedy career
- Years active: 1999–present
- Medium: Television
- Genres: Sketch comedy; improv comedy
- Members: James Murray; Sal Vulcano; Brian Quinn
- Former members: Joe Gatto; Mike Boccio; Gideon Horowitz

The Tenderloins, also called the Impractical Jokers, are an American comedy troupe composed of James "Murr" Murray, Brian "Q" Quinn, Sal Vulcano, and formerly Joe Gatto. The four are the creators and stars of the hidden camera comedy series Impractical Jokers (2011–present), although Gatto left the troupe and show in 2021. The troupe also formerly included Gideon Horowitz and Mike Boccio, who left in 2005 and 2006, respectively.

== Background ==
The comedians met in a religion class during their freshman year at Monsignor Farrell High School on Staten Island in 1990. After discovering their mutual interests in drama and improv, the group joined an improv club because "it was the only way to meet girls", since they attended an all-boys school. To come up with a name for their comedy troupe, the friends referenced a list of words kept by member Sal Vulcano that he would find embarrassing to say, the group would eventually settle on "The Tenderloins" as their troupe name.

== Career ==
=== Stage ===
After finishing college, James Murray was on his way to work on the Staten Island Ferry, where he ran into his friend Sal. They reminisced about their enjoyment doing improv. After reuniting with Joe Gatto and another friend, Mike Boccio, they practiced improv at Joe's house three days a week, for six months. The Tenderloins began in 1999 as a live improv comedy and sketch comedy troupe.

By 2002, the troupe now consisted of five members: Mike Boccio, Joe Gatto, Gideon Horowitz, James Murray and Sal Vulcano. After the success of Impractical Jokers, the Tenderloins have also taken part in several American and international tours. They have performed in New York, Los Angeles, and Chicago, and participated in the San Francisco Sketch Comedy Festival and also the Miami Improv Festival.

=== Internet success ===
Following years of live shows, the Tenderloins redirected their talents to film comedic sketches. Horowitz had already left the group, and Boccio left in 2006. Former classmate Brian Quinn subsequently joined, replacing Boccio as the troupe's fourth member.

The Tenderloins' comedic sketches have accumulated millions of views on YouTube, MySpace, Metacafe, and other websites. In 2007, the troupe won the $100,000 grand prize in the NBC It's Your Show competition for the sketch "Time Thugs".

=== Television ===
Following the troupe's online successes, the four were signed to develop a scripted comedy pilot for Spike TV based on their own lives. The pilot was shot on location in 2008 on Staten Island, as well as at other locations around New York City. Spike TV ultimately passed on the series. A second pilot starring the Tenderloins was officially selected for the 2009 New York Television Festival.

On April 12, 2011, truTV announced a new series to star the Tenderloins. Impractical Jokers premiered on December 15, 2011, executive-produced by the troupe themselves. Season 1 consisted of 16 episodes. The first season was watched by over 32 million viewers.

The show's second season premiered on December 13, 2012, and consisted of 28 episodes. Its third season had 31 episodes and premiered on January 2, 2014. On April 21, 2014, truTV announced that the series would be renewed for a 26-episode fourth season. With the fourth season renewal, a 6-episode spinoff series, Jokers Wild!, was also announced. The show was renewed for a fifth season, which began in February 2016. On July 22, 2016, a sixth season was announced, which began on February 9, 2017. After another successful season, Impractical Jokers was renewed for a seventh season that began on February 1, 2018. In March 2018 TruTV announced Impractical Jokers was renewed for an eighth season, which consists of 26 episodes and premiered on March 28, 2019. A feature-length movie, Impractical Jokers: The Movie, was released theatrically on February 21, 2020.

In 2019, the troupe starred in the TBS game show series, Misery Index, based on the card game "Shit Happens" created by Andy Breckman, who created and wrote the popular TV series Monk and the Netflix series The Good Cop.

=== Live tour ===
The Troupe has toured steadily over the last four years with their "Where's Larry?", "Santiago Sent Us," and "Cranjis McBasketball" tours playing to hundreds of thousands of fans in the US and UK, including three sold-out nights at Radio City Music Hall, a sold-out Madison Square Garden, and five sold-out shows at London's O2 Arena.

=== Radio ===
In February 2017, Murr tweeted that he and the group had recorded the first episode of an upcoming limited-run show for SiriusXM Radio. On August 17, 2017, The Tenderloins Radio Show made its debut on SiriusXM Radio channel 94 (Comedy Greats). In the hour-long broadcast, the comedy troupe pranks friends and acquaintances, takes calls, answers emails from fans, and does sketches in a segment called "Tenderloins Theatre".

=== Podcasts ===
==== The Tenderloins Podcast ====
The group began hosting a podcast in April 2012, named The Tenderloins Podcast.

==== What Say You? ====
What Say You?, an occasional podcast hosted by Sal and Q, was named Best New Show at the 2013 Stitcher Awards. The increased popularity of What Say You sparked a friendly competition among the friends, spurring Joe and Murr to release their own Tenderloins podcast without the other two members. In 2015, What Say You? was nominated for the Comedy, Entertainment, and Best Produced Podcast Awards at the 10th Annual Podcast Awards. Sal and Q have stated that the podcast is their own side project, not a replacement of The Tenderloins Podcast. The group explained that it was difficult to coordinate the schedules of all four members outside of work, making it challenging to produce their troupe's official podcast with any regularity.

== Members ==
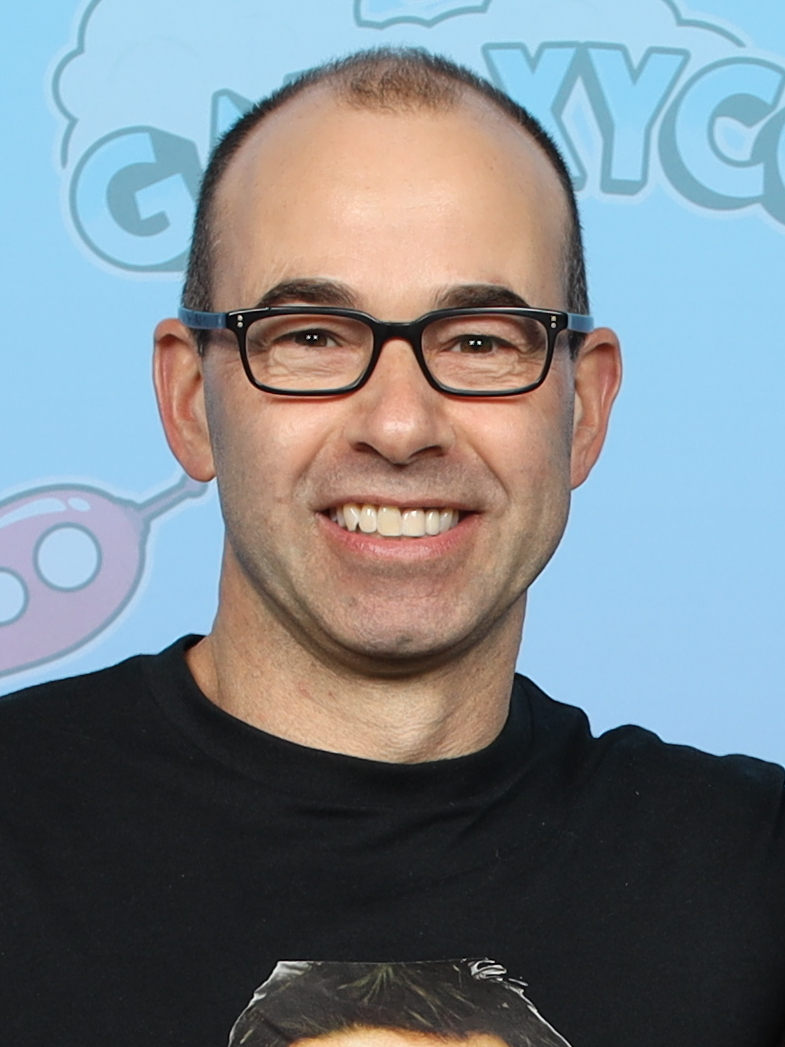
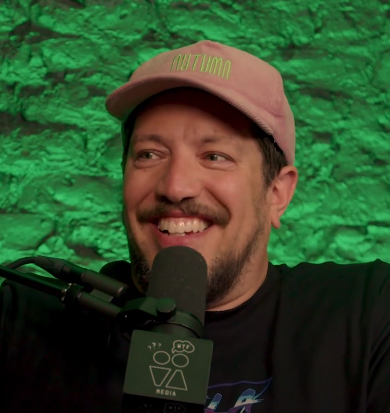
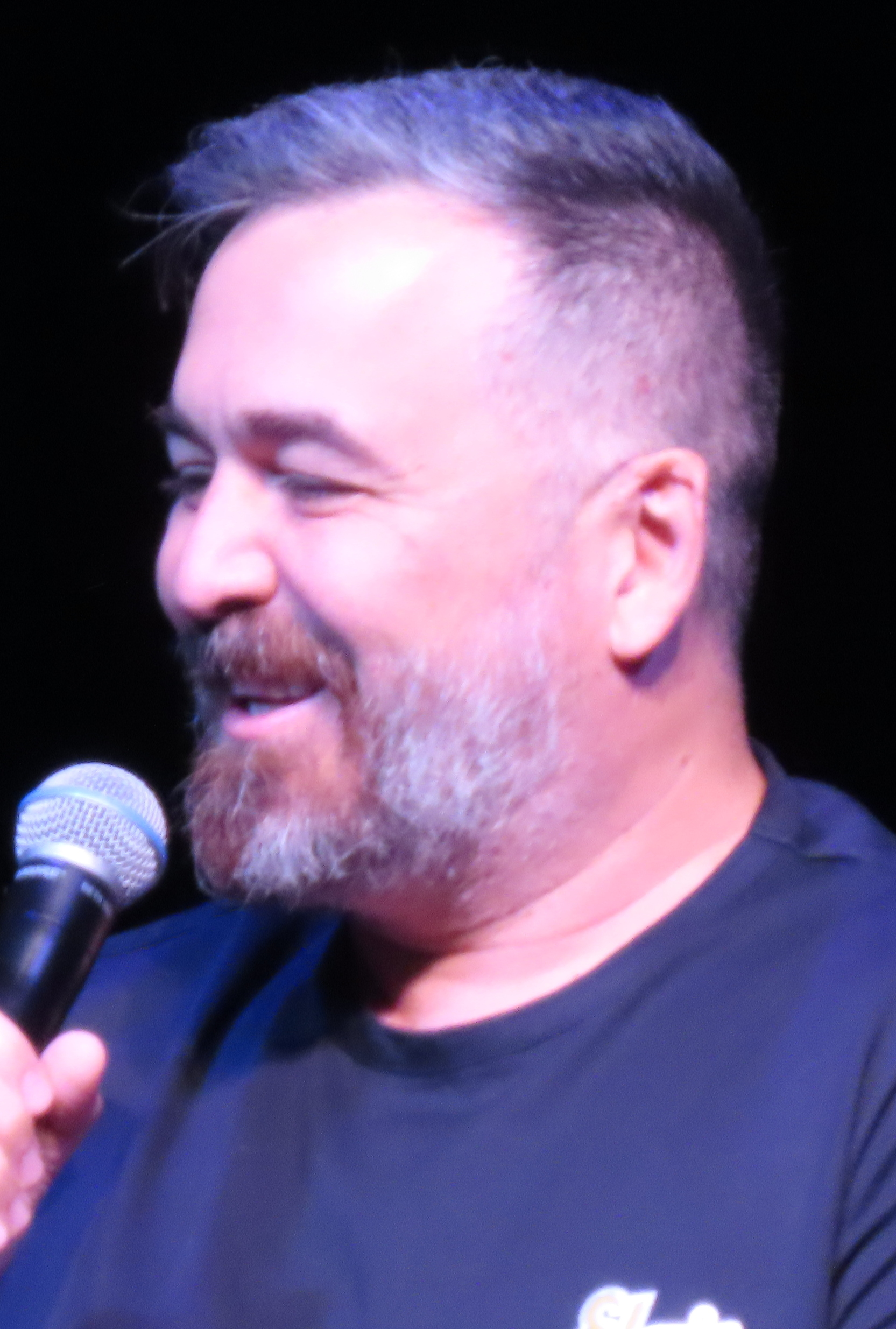
The current members of The Tenderloins: James Murray (pictured 2025), Sal Vulcano (pictured 2023), and Brian Quinn (pictured 2022)

=== Current ===
- James Murray (1999–present) is an improvisational comedian from Staten Island. He also worked at NorthSouth Productions, where he served as the Senior Vice President of Development. In 2018, he released a sci-fi/horror book called Awakened, which was co-written by Darren Wearmouth. A sequel, called The Brink, was released in 2019.
- Sal Vulcano (1999–present) is an improvisational and stand-up comedian from Staten Island. For the 9th season of Impractical Jokers, Vulcano received a "punishment" where he was to change his billing name from "Sal" to "Prince Herb," reflected on The Tenderloins website and other official media and publicity.
- Brian Quinn (2006–present) is an improvisational comedian from Staten Island. A former firefighter, he joined the Tenderloins in 2006 after Mike Boccio left. He also co-hosts the podcast Tell 'Em Steve-Dave!

=== Former ===
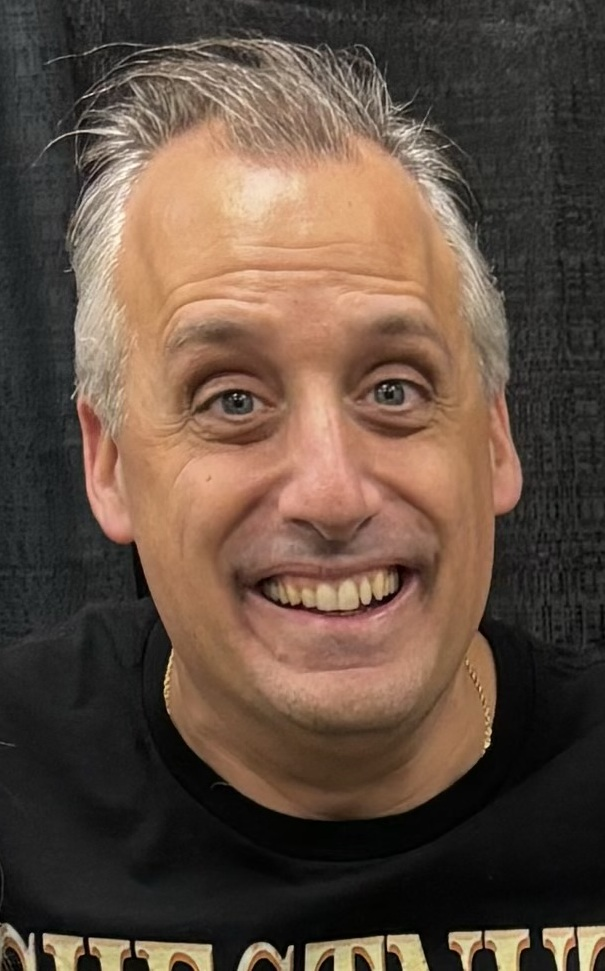
Former member Joe Gatto, pictured in December 2024

- Joe Gatto (1999–2021) is an improvisational comedian from Staten Island. He co-founded The Tenderloins in 1999 and worked at the baby retail store Giggle, until January 2012. He has two children with his wife Bessy. On December 31, 2021, he announced he was leaving the group to focus on his family. In April 2023, Gatto made a guest appearance at an Impractical Jokers performance in Boston, Massachusetts. On August 25, 2024, the Impractical Jokers wrapped up a 2 year long tour in Hanover, Maryland at Live! Casino & Hotel and Gatto made a surprise appearance towards the end of the show.
- Mike Boccio (1999–2006) is an improvisational comedian from Staten Island. He was one of the original cast members in 1999. He left the group and was replaced by Quinn around the time the group was shifting from stage comedy to filming videos on the internet.
- Gideon Horowitz (2002–2005) is an improvisational comedian from Staten Island. He was a member of the Tenderloins from 2002 to 2005.
