= Drunk History (British TV series) =

British television series

- Genre: Comedy
- Based on: Drunk History by Derek Waters
- Directed by: Tom McKay
- Narrated by: Jimmy Carr
- Country of origin: United Kingdom
- Original language: English
- No. of series: 3
- No. of episodes: 28 (inc. two specials)

Production
- Executive producers: Lourdes Diaz; Jill Offman; Joe McVey; Andy Brererton
- Producer: Ben Rogers
- Cinematography: Ben Bee
- Editors: Stuart Lutes; Guy Tetzner; Andy Kinnear
- Running time: 30 minutes
- Production company: Tiger Aspect Productions

Original release
- Network: Comedy Central; MTV (Geordie Shore special)
- Release: 12 January 2015 – 3 May 2017

Related
- Drunk History; Drunk History Australia

Drunk History is a British comedy television series that premiered on Comedy Central on 12 January 2015. It is based on the American television series of the same name. In each episode, a celebrity (usually a comedian) struggles to recount a historical event while intoxicated. Their account is then reconstructed by actors. The show is narrated by Jimmy Carr.

The second series began broadcasting in February 2016. A special edition featuring Holly Hagan and Gaz Beadle from the MTV show Geordie Shore was broadcast on MTV on 23 February 2016.

The third series began airing on 8 March 2017 at 10pm on Comedy Central UK.

== Episodes ==
=== Series 1 ===
No.	Title	Original air date
1	"Episode One"	12 January 2015
Rob Beckett (3 pints of lager, 8 whiskies, and 6 shots of sambuca) on Henry VIII, starring Tom Davis as Henry VIII of England and Mathew Horne as Thomas Cromwell. Kerry Howard (7 vodka tonics and 3 shots of sambucas) on Queen Victoria and Prince Albert, starring Rebecca Front as Queen Victoria and Joel Fry as Prince Albert. James Acaster (3 piña coladas, 5 whiskey sours, and 5 beers) on The Black Death.
2	"Episode Two"	19 January 2015
Tom Rosenthal (3 pints of lager and ¾ bottle of whisky) on The Great Fire of London. Andrew Maxwell (3 bottles of champagne) on grave robbers Burke and Hare. Rob Beckett (8 whiskies, 6 shots of sambuca, and 2 pints of lager) on Queen Victoria's unwanted cheese.
3	"Episode Three"	26 January 2015
Romesh Ranganathan (8 beers and 3 shots of sambuca) on Tutankhamen. Joe Lycett (4 glasses of prosecco, 1 bottle of champagne, and 1 shot of sambuca) on highwayman Dick Turpin. Tom Rosenthal (2/3 bottle of whiskey) explains why Lord Byron had a pet bear.
4	"Episode Four"	2 February 2015
Joe Lycett (4 glasses of prosecco, 1 bottle of champagne, and 1 shot of sambuca) on the Kray twins. Ben Ashenden (5 beers and 3 double vodka Red Bulls) on Guy Fawkes and the gunpowder plot. Unable to continue the story, he is replaced halfway through the story by Russell Kane (1 vodka martini, 2 double Southern Comforts, and 1 vodka & Coke).
5	"Episode Five"	9 February 2015
Russell Kane (1 vodka martini, 3 double Southern Comforts, 2 double vodka Cokes, and 2 double vodka Red Bulls) talks King Charles II. Alex Horne (7 beers, 2 shots of sambuca, and 1 bottle of wine) on the 1966 World Cup trophy theft. Diane Morgan (7 gin & tonics and 3 shots of sambuca) chats about Lady Godiva.
6	"Episode Six"	16 February 2015
Kerry Howard (7 vodka tonics and 3 shots of sambuca) on Blackbeard. Joel Dommett (4 pints of cider, 3 glasses of wine, and 2 Jägerbombs) on Colonel Blood. Tiff Stevenson (4 glasses of prosecco and 2 margaritas) on Henry VIII.
7	"Episode Seven"	23 February 2015
James Acaster (6 piña coladas, 3 beers, and 3 whisky sours) on Henry II and Thomas Becket. Tiff Stevenson (2 margaritas and 4 glasses of prosecco) on the discovery of DNA. Romesh Raganathan (8 beers and 3 shots of sambuca) on William the Conqueror.
8	"Episode Eight"	2 March 2015
Joel Dommett (4 ciders, 3 glasses of wine, and 2 Jägerbombs) on Baden Powell and the Boy Scouts, starring Sanjeev Bhaskar as Baden-Powell. Diane Morgan (2 shots of sambuca and 7 gin tonics) on Florence Nightingale, starring Jessica Knappett as Florence Nightingale and Johnny Vegas as Vicar Andrew. Andrew Maxwell (3 bottles of champagne) on the worst zoo ever.

=== Series 2 ===
No.	Title	Original air date
9	"Episode One"	3 February 2016
Retelling Tom Craine (3 1/2 pints of lager and 5 dbl vodka & lemonades) on "The Rise & Fall of Sir Walter Raleigh" Tom Davis (9 pints of lager and 2 Jägerbombs) on "Robin Hood and Maid Marian". Cast Jack Whitehall as Sir Walter Raleigh Michelle Keegan as Queen Elizabeth I Mathew Baynton as Robin Hood Emma Bunton as Maid Marian
10	"Episode Two"	10 February 2016
Retelling Iain Stirling (2 pints of lager and 9 dbl whiskey & cokes) on "Scott of the Antarctic" Chris Ramsey (16 bottles of lager) on "The Sinking of the Titanic". Cast Mathew Horne as Robert Falcon Scott Catherine Tate as Edward Wilson’s Wife Ben Bailey Smith as Bruce Ismay Phill Jupitus as Captain Edward John Smith
11	"Episode Three"	17 February 2016
Retelling Isy Suttie (7 glasses of prosecco and 2 sambucas) on "Prince Edward and Mrs Simpson" Ed Gamble (11 dbl gin & tonics and 7 dbl vodka red bulls) on "The Great Escape". Cast Tom Stourton as Edward VIII Greg James as Alan Lascelles Sophie McShera as Wallis Simpson Rich Hall as Wally Floody Dustin Demri-Burns as Roger Bushell Jamie Laing as a Prisoner
12	"Episode Four"	2 March 2016
Tom Rosenthal talks about Richard III (featuring Hugh Dennis), while Jessica Knappett tells the story of Mary Shelley's Frankenstein (featuring Mathew Baynton, Morgana Robinson, Jon Richardson and Vicky Pattison).
13	"Episode Five"	9 March 2016
Retelling Charlotte Ritchie (4 pints of beer and a bottle of white wine) on "The Cottingley Fairies". Nish Kumar (4 pints of beer and a 1.5 bottles of red wine) on "The Invention of the Telephone". Cast Catherine Tate as Frances Griffiths Mathew Horne as Elsie Griffiths Anthony Head as Alexander Graham Bell Tim Key as Thomas Edison Mathew Baynton as Antonio Meucci
14	"Episode Six"	16 March 2016
Retelling Joe Lycett (4 pints of lager, 3 glasses of prosecco and 2 tequila shots) on "The Battle of Trafalgar" Ellie Taylor (1 glass of prosecco, 6 vodka & diet cokes) on "The Virgin Queen". Cast Anthony Head as Admiral Nelson Alexander MacQueen as Sir Thomas Hardy Sarah Alexander as Queen Elizabeth I Brett Goldstein as Robert Dudley
15	"Episode Seven"	23 March 2016
Retelling Matt Richardson (13 double gin and tonics) on "Churchill Attacks the Nazis" Josie Long (2 aperol spritz, 2 campari & oranges, 4 rum & cokes and 3 rum & gingers) on "Dr. Crippen". Cast Simon Bird as Winston Churchill Dustin Demri-Burns as Adolf Hitler Marek Larwood as Hawley Harvey Crippen Olivia Colman as Ethel Le Neve
16	"Episode Eight"	30 March 2016
Retelling Tom Parry (5 pints of beer, 1 Jägerbomb, 1 snakebite & black, 5 double rum & cokes) on "Arthur Conan Doyle: Becoming Sherlock" John Robins (3 pints of ale, 9 double rum & cokes) & Elis James (6 pints of ale, 3 double rum & cokes) on "Battle of Waterloo". Cast Bradley Walsh as Sir Arthur Conan Doyle Julian Rhind-Tutt as Oscar Slater Dan Skinner as Wellington Hugh Dennis as Napoleon
17	"Episode Nine"	6 April 2016
Retelling Nick Helm (6 bottles of beer, 3/4 bottle of Amaretto, 2 double vodka & sodas) on "Battle of Hastings" Sara Pascoe (7 glasses of Prosecco) on "Catherine Parr". Cast Emma Bunton as Catherine Parr Phill Jupitus as William The Conqueror Neil Maskell as Henry VIII

=== Series 3 ===
No.	Title	Original air date
18	"Episode One"	8 March 2017
Retelling Brian "Q" Quinn and Sal Vulcano on "The Assassination of James Garfield" Joel Dommett on "The Dambusters" Cast Brett Goldstein as James Garfield Chris O'Dowd as Sir Barnes Wallis Alexander Armstrong as Sir Arthur Harris Joe Wilkinson as Doctor Willard Bliss
19	"Episode Two"	15 March 2017
Retelling James "Murr" Murray on "Billy The Kid" Jessica Knappett & Lydia Rose Bewley on "The Royal Rivalry of Elizabeth & Mary" Cast Rufus Hound as James Dolan Mathew Horne as Billy the Kid Katy Brand as Queen Elizabeth I Michelle Keegan as Mary, Queen of Scots Tim Key as Lord Darnley
20	"Episode Three"	22 March 2017
Retelling Russell Kane on "King Arthur" Iain Stirling on "Eric Liddell" Cast Rufus Hound as God Aisling Bea as Guinevere
21	"Episode Four"	29 March 2017
Retelling Kerry Howard on "Beatrix Potter" Joe Lycett on "The Great Train Robbery" Cast Emma Bunton as Beatrix Potter Simon Bird as Bruce Reynolds
22	"Episode Five"	5 April 2017
Retelling Luisa Omielan on "The Suffragettes" Tom Rosenthal on "The Battle of Agincourt" Cast Jessica Hynes as Emmeline Pankhurst Stephen Mangan as King Henry V
23	"Episode Six"	12 April 2017
Retelling Adam Buxton on "King Alfred & The Vikings" Phil Wang on "Isaac Newton" Cast Alexander Armstrong as King Alfred Joe Wilkinson as Beggar Matthew Lewis as Edmond Halley Charlotte Crosby as Hannah Newton
24	"Episode Seven"	19 April 2017
Retelling Tom Parry on "John Logie Baird" Rick Edwards on "The Christmas Truce" Cast Jamie Laing as Gordon Selfridge Paul Kaye as John Logie Baird Stephen Mangan as Lieutenant Sir Edward Hulse Note: A Different Edit of "The Christmas Truce" was shown as part of the Christmas Special
25	"Episode Eight"	26 April 2017
Retelling Judi Love on "The Fall of Charles I" Miles Jupp on "Operation Mincemeat" Cast Ashley Walters as King Charles I Lolly Adefope as Archivist Mark Benton as Oliver Cromwell
26	"Episode Nine"	3 May 2017
Retelling Daniel Sloss on "The Battle of Stirling Bridge" Tom Davis on "How Shakespeare Went Gangster" Cast Mark Heap as William Shakespeare Sian Gibson as Anne Hathaway Keith Allen as William Wallace

=== Specials ===
No.	Title	Original air date
Special	"Geordie Shore Special"	23 February 2016
A special edition featuring two of the cast from the MTV show Geordie Shore. Holly Hagan tells the story of Henry VIII (Tim Key) creating the Church of England to divorce Catherine of Aragon (Daisy Beaumont) and marry Anne Boleyn (Cariad Lloyd); while Gary Beadle tells the story of how Ian Fleming (Ben Willbond) created the James Bond novels. Note: This episode was broadcast on MTV rather than Comedy Central.
Special	"Christmas Special"	21 December 2016
Rick Edwards tells the story of the WW1 Christmas Truce stars Stephen Mangan. Russell Kane narrates the birth of baby Jesus (stars Johnny Vegas, Sally Phillips and Danny John-Jules).
