= Paul C. Genereux =

US Army brigadier general

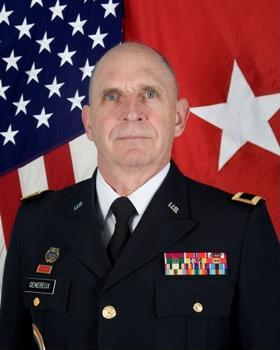
- Genereux in 2011
- Born: October 12, 1950 (age 76); Staten Island, New York, US
- Education: Manhattan College; United States Army Command and General Staff College; United States Army War College
- Spouse(s): Sandra Mankowski (m. 1974) Rosalie Dancisin (m. 2006)
- Military career
- Service: United States Army
- Service years: 1972–2012
- Rank: Brigadier General
- Unit: New York Army National Guard
- Commands: Combat Support Company, 1st Squadron, 101st Cavalry Regiment; Headquarters Troop, 1st Squadron, 101st Cavalry; A Troop, 1st Squadron, 101st Cavalry; 1st Battalion, 101st Cavalry; 3rd Brigade, 42nd Infantry Division; 42nd Infantry Division
- Wars: Iraq War
- Awards: Army Distinguished Service Medal; Legion of Merit; Bronze Star Medal; Complete list
- Other work: Civil engineer Construction project manager

Paul C. Genereux (born 12 October 1950) is a retired United States Army officer. A veteran of the Iraq War, he served from 1972 to 2012 and attained the rank of brigadier general. Genereux was assistant division commander of the 42nd Infantry Division during its 2004 and 2005 Iraq service, and he commanded the division from 2006 to 2009. Genereux's awards included the Army Distinguished Service Medal, Legion of Merit, Bronze Star Medal.

Genereux was raised and educated on Staten Island and he graduated from Monsignor Farrell High School in 1968. In 1972, he received his bachelor's degree from Manhattan College. Genereux pursued a civilian career as a civil engineer and construction project manager. He began his military career in 1972 when he enlisted in the Pennsylvania Army National Guard, where he served until obtaining a direct commission in the United States Army Reserve in 1978. He soon transferred his military membership to the New York Army National Guard, where he served in Armor and Infantry units and advanced through the ranks to command a company, two cavalry troops, an Armor battalion, and an Infantry brigade.

In 2004, Genereux was promoted to brigadier general and assigned as assistant division commander of the 42nd Infantry Division. He served in this position during the division's 2004 and 2005 deployment for the Iraq War. After the war, he commanded the division from 2006 to 2009. From 2009 until retiring in 2012, he served as New York's assistant adjutant general for army. After retiring, Genereux resided in Jensen Beach, Florida.

== Early life ==
Paul C. Genereux Jr. was born on 12 October 1950 a son of Paul C. Genereux Sr. and Catherine A. (Miller) Genereux. His parents moved from Rhode Island to Staten Island in 1950; he was raised and educated on Staten Island and graduated from Monsignor Farrell High School in 1968. He then attended Manhattan College, from which he graduated in 1972 with a Bachelor of Science degree in civil engineering. In his civilian career, Genereux worked as a civil engineer and construction project manager. In October 1972, he joined the Pennsylvania Army National Guard, and he served for five years before receiving his direct commission as a first lieutenant.

== Start of career ==
After receiving his commission, Genereux served from February 1978 to December 1978 as operations officer of the United States Army Reserve's 300th Civil Affairs Group, which was based in Riverdale, Maryland. He then transferred his military membership to the New York Army National Guard, where he served from December 1978 to February 1980 as scout platoon leader for Combat Support Company, 1st Battalion, 71st Infantry Regiment in Staten Island. From March 1980 to December 1980, he served as the unit's heavy mortar platoon leader. He was then assigned as the company commander, and he served in this position from December 1980 to September 1983. Genereux was promoted to captain in January 1981.

From October 1983 to March 1984, Genereux commanded Headquarters Troop, 1st Squadron, 101st Cavalry Regiment in Staten Island. He commanded the squadron's A Troop from April 1984 to January 1987. In February 1987, Genereux was appointed as the squadron's Intelligence staff officer (S-2), and he held this post until November 1988. In December 1988, he was appointed as the squadron's plans, operations, and training officer (S-3). He was promoted to major in January 1989, and he served as squadron S-3 until February 1993. From March 1993 to August 1993, he served as squadron executive officer until August 1993. A reorganization of the New York National Guard in September 1993 led to his appointment as executive officer of 1st Battalion, 101st Cavalry, and he served in this position until September 1995.

=== Military education ===
The military education Genereux completed during his career included:

- Infantry Officer Basic Course
- Armor Officer Basic Course
- Infantry Officer Advanced Course
- United States Army Command and General Staff College
- United States Army War College (Master of Science in Strategic Studies)

== Continued career ==
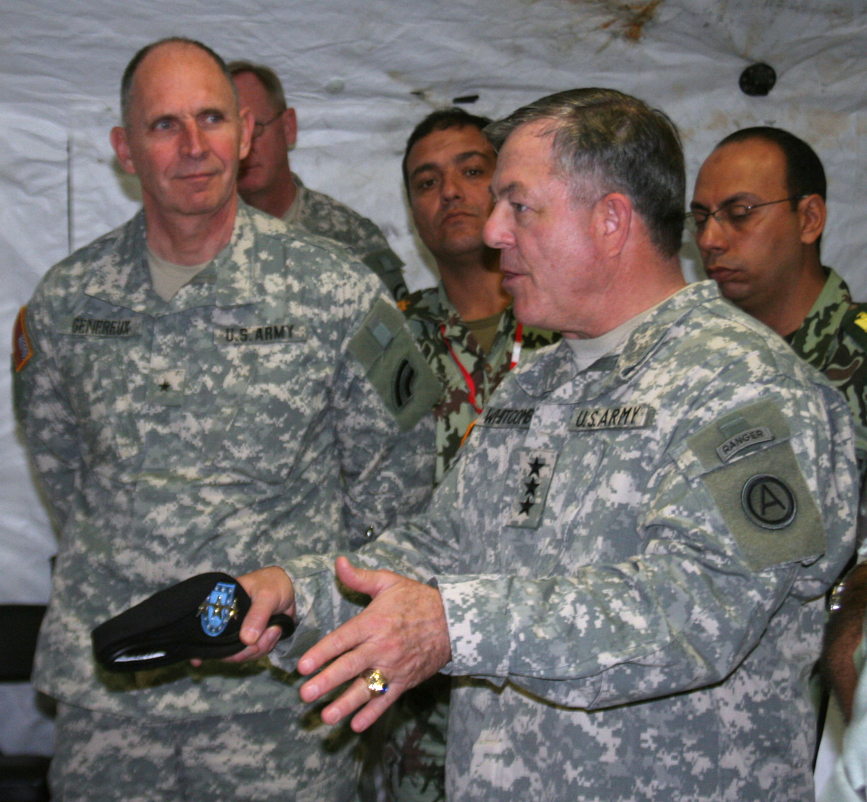
Genereux as 42nd Division commander during Exercise Bright Star in 2007.

In October 1995, Genereux was assigned as Civil Affairs officer (S-5) on the staff of the 27th Infantry Brigade in Syracuse. He was promoted to lieutenant colonel in November, and he carried out this assignment until September 1996. In October 1996, he was selected to command 1st Battalion, 101st Cavalry, and he held this position until March 2000. From April to June 2000, he was assistant chief of staff for logistics (G-4) on the staff of the 42nd Infantry Division in Troy, New York. In July 2000, Genereux was promoted to colonel and assigned as liaison officer at the headquarters of New York's State Area Command in Latham, and he held this post until March 2001.

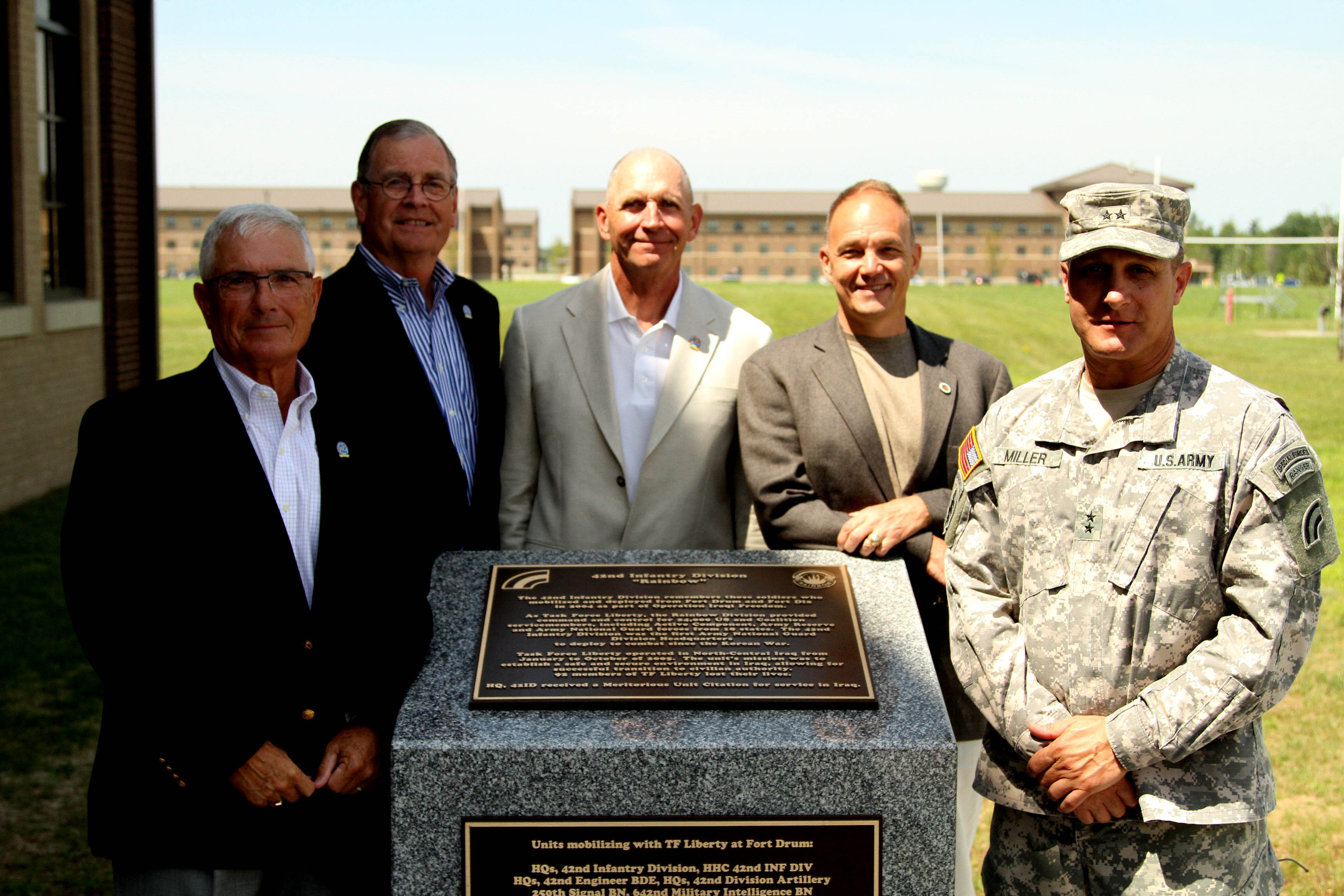
Current and former commanders at dedication of 42nd Division's Iraq War monument in 2014. Genereux is in center

From March to December 2001, Genereux served as deputy commander of the 53rd Troop Command, which was based in Valhalla. During this posting, he also served as deputy commander of Joint Task Force-3, the New York National Guard's New York City-based ad hoc unit form to respond to the September 11, 2001 terrorist attack. He commanded 3rd Brigade, 42nd Infantry Division in Buffalo from January 2002 to June 2003. From July 2003 to July 2004, Genereux was the 42nd Division's assistant division commander for training, and he was promoted to brigadier general in May 2004. From July 2004 to February 2006, Genereux was the 42nd Infantry Division's assistant division commander for maneuver, including deployment to Iraq during the Iraq War.

In March 2006, Genereux was assigned to command of the 42nd Infantry Division. He served until May 2009, and was responsible for units in 16 states and the District of Columbia, to include establishing goals and objectives, providing leadership and guidance, and managing individual and unit training and readiness. From May 2009 until retiring in January 2012, Genereux served as New York's assistant adjutant general for army. Genereux was a resident of Bloomsburg, Pennsylvania until retiring in Jensen Beach, Florida.

== Awards ==
Genereux's awards included:

- Army Distinguished Service Medal
- Legion of Merit
- Bronze Star Medal
- Meritorious Service Medal with 4 bronze oak leaf clusters
- Army Commendation Medal with 2 bronze oak leaf clusters
- Army Reserve Components Achievement Medal with 1 silver and 2 bronze oak leaf clusters
- National Defense Service Medal with 2 bronze service stars
- Iraq Campaign Medal with one bronze service star
- Global War on Terrorism Service Medal
- Humanitarian Service Medal
- Armed Forces Reserve Medal with gold hourglass
- Army Service Ribbon
- Overseas Service Ribbon

== Dates of rank ==
Genereux's dates of rank were:

- Brigadier General 27 May 2004
- Colonel 3 July 2000
- Lieutenant Colonel 31 December 1995
- Major 1 January 1989
- Captain 23 January 1981
- First Lieutenant, 25 February 1978
