= Brian Quinn (comedian) =

American comedian (born 1976)

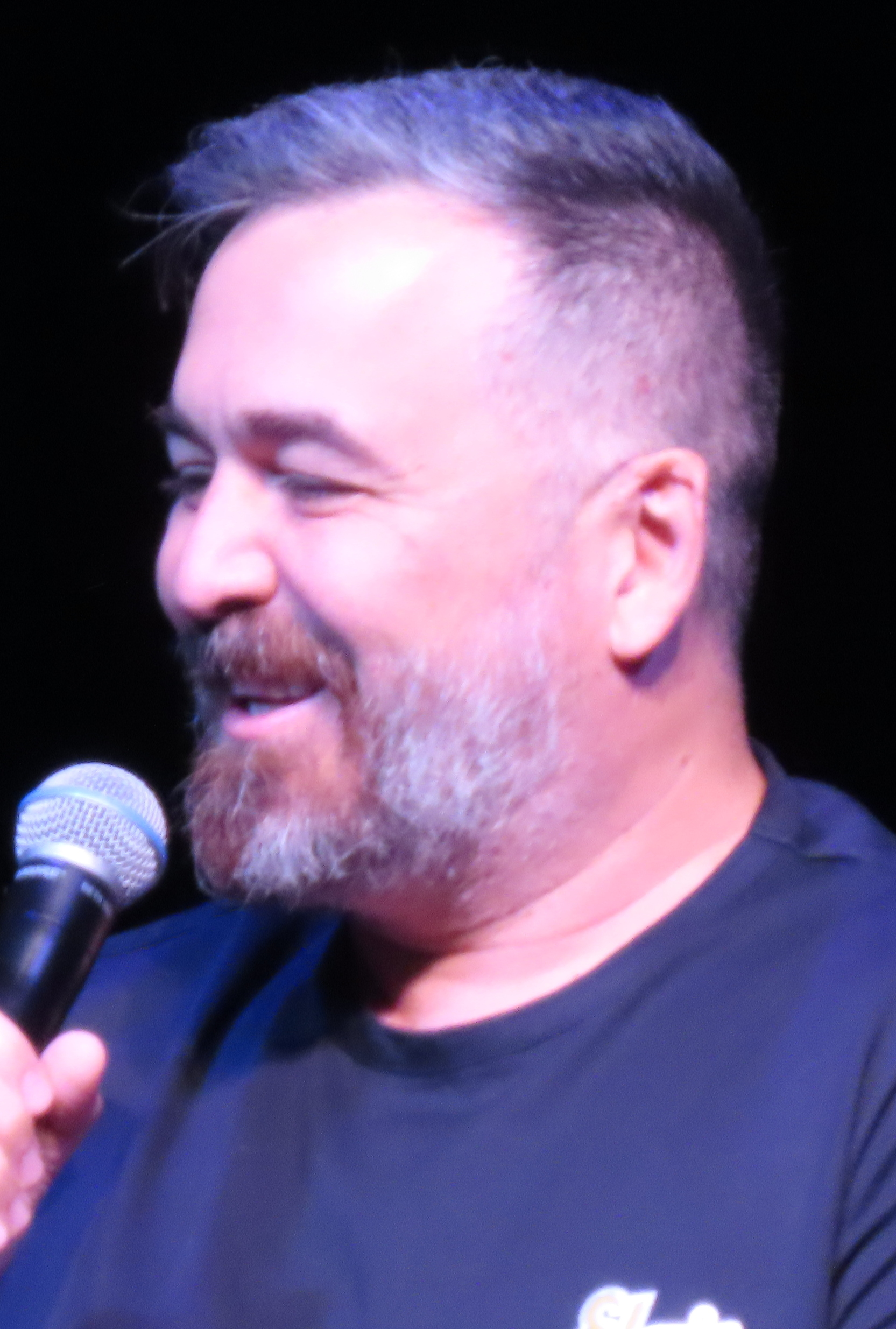
- Quinn performing in August 2022
- Born: Brian Michael Quinn; March 14, 1976 (age 50); New York City, U.S.
- Education: Brooklyn College
- Occupations: Comedian; actor; producer
- Years active: 1998–present

Brian Michael "Q" Quinn (born March 14, 1976) is an American improvisational comedian and actor. He is a member of The Tenderloins, a comedy troupe consisting of himself, Sal Vulcano, James Murray, and formerly Joe Gatto. Along with Vulcano and Murray, Quinn stars in the television series Impractical Jokers, which first premiered in December 2011, on TruTV.

== Early life ==
Brian Michael Quinn was born on March 14, 1976, in the borough of Brooklyn in New York City, but moved to Staten Island at two years old. He is of Irish and Italian ancestry. His mother was born in Italy, and migrated to the U.S. at the age of two. His father is of Irish descent.

Quinn attended Monsignor Farrell High School. Along with James Murray, Sal Vulcano, and Joe Gatto, he was a member of his high school's Improvisation Club. He studied at Brooklyn College before joining the New York City Fire Department, where he served for eight years.

== Career ==
=== Early career ===
Despite not being an initial member of his friends' comedy troupe The Tenderloins, after one of the original members, Mike Boccio, left the group in 2006, Quinn became the troupe's then-fourth member.

The Tenderloins began producing comedy sketches together, posting them on YouTube, Myspace, and Metacafe, accumulating millions of views online. In 2007, the troupe won the $100,000 grand prize in the NBC It's Your Show competition for the sketch "Time Thugs".

=== Impractical Jokers and other television shows ===
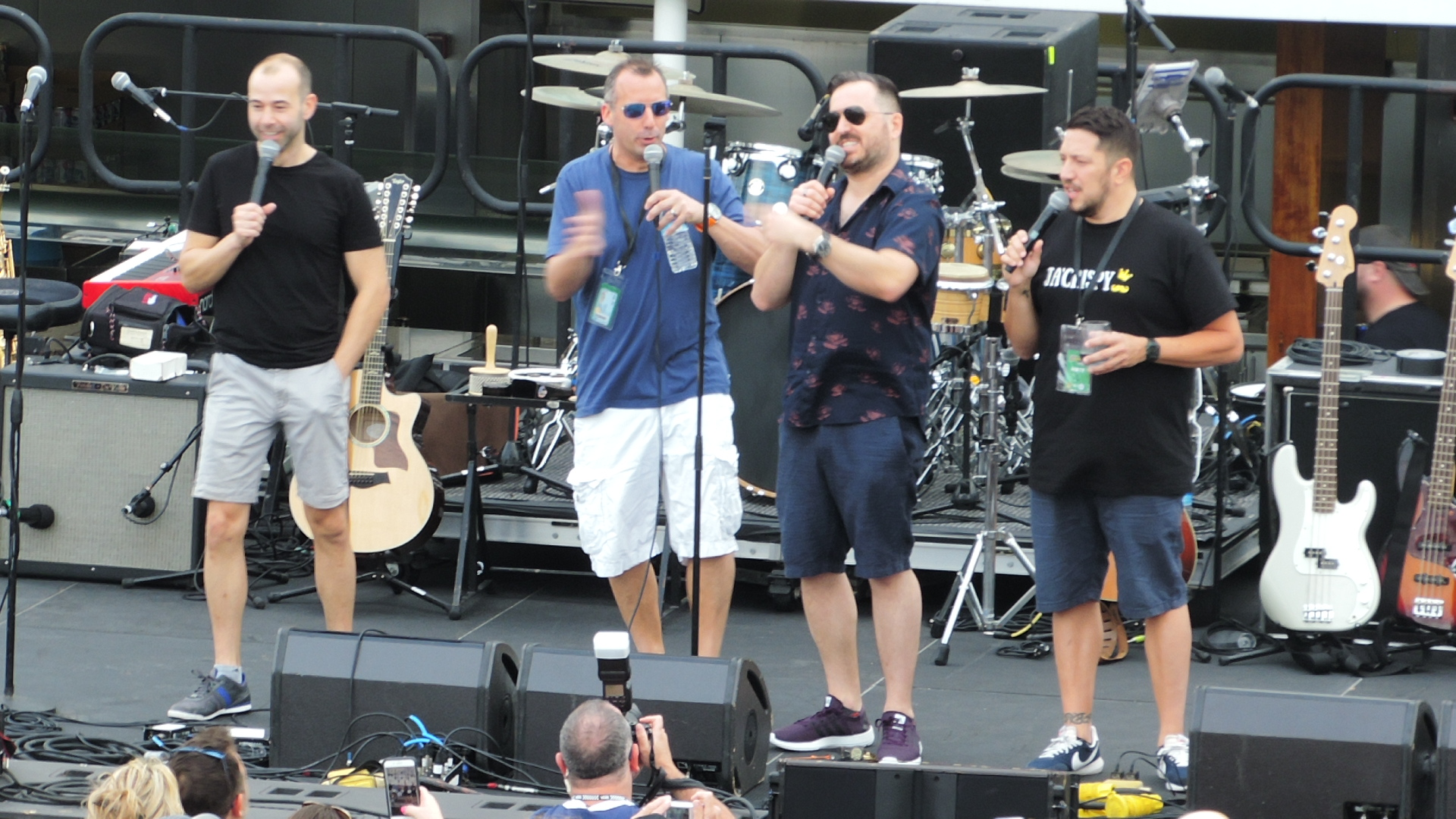
The Tenderloins performing in New Orleans in November 2017. From left to right: James Murray, former member Joe Gatto, Quinn, and Sal Vulcano.

Impractical Jokers premiered on December 15, 2011, on TruTV. The first season was watched by over 32 million viewers. The show quickly became the most popular series on TruTV, and boosted Quinn and his fellow cast members into the public eye. During the first two seasons of Impractical Jokers Quinn also continued working as a firefighter, however in 2013 he took a leave of absence and focused all his time on the show. He later recalled in an interview with Forbes Magazine "We shot the pilot in 2010 and shot the season through 2011, so for the first two years of the show, I was still working in the firehouse, which was very difficult to do—shooting a TV show more than 40 hours a week, The fire department commitment was 48 hours a week at least, and that's before you get into overtime or covering for guys who aren't working. So, the first two years of the show were difficult. It was the firehouse and the TV show, so I had to take a leave of absence when we got picked up for Season 3."

Quinn has been doing Impractical Jokers performances (live comedy tours) since 2012.

Quinn had a cameo in the first episode of the second season of 12 Monkeys, which first aired in the US on April 18, 2016.

In 2017, Quinn played Austin in the film Victor Crowley.

Quinn was in the 6th episode of Tacoma FD, 'Full Moon Fever', released on May 2, 2019. In October of that year, Quinn, along with the other members of the Tenderloins, starred in The Misery Index, which is hosted by Jameela Jamil and is based on Andy Breckman's card game "Shit Happens".

Impractical Jokers: The Movie was released on February 21, 2020.

Quinn had a cameo in the fourth episode of the second season of Star Trek: Picard, which first aired in the US on March 25, 2022. That same year Quinn also made a cameo in the film Clerks III. On the February 10, 2023, episode of AEW Rampage, Quinn and Murray appeared in a segment where they were beaten down by Chris Jericho and the Jericho Appreciation Society.

Quinn made a cameo in the film Screamboat which was released on April 2, 2025.

He was the executive producer of the TV movie Foul Play with Anthony Davis, which was released in 2025.

Quinn made a cameo in the 6th episode of VisionQuest, 'Deadlock' , which was released on October 27, 2026.

=== Podcasts ===
==== Tell 'Em Steve-Dave ====
Quinn is also a co-host of the podcast Tell 'Em Steve-Dave!, which he hosts with Bryan Johnson and Walt Flanagan. The podcast started in February 2010 with Quinn in the role of the off-mic audio engineer, then shortly after as occasional commentator and ultimately co-host.

The show has won a plethora of awards. In 2010, the show won two Podcast Awards, one for People's Choice and the other as Best Comedy. That same year, the show was named a Best of 2010 audio podcast by iTunes. It won the 2012 Stitcher Award for Best Entertainment & Pop Culture, and the 2nd Annual Kevin Allison Excellence in Podcasting Award.

==== The Tenderloins Podcast ====
The group began hosting a podcast, called The Tenderloins Podcast, in April 2012. It is available on their official website and iTunes.

==== What Say You? ====
What Say You?, an occasional podcast hosted by Vulcano and Quinn, was named Best New Show at the 2013 Stitcher Awards. The increased popularity of What Say You? sparked a friendly competition among the comedians, spurring Gatto and Murray to release their own Tenderloins podcast without the other two members. In 2015, What Say You? was nominated for the Comedy, Entertainment, and Best Produced Podcast Awards at the 10th Annual Podcast Awards. Vulcano and Quinn have stated that the podcast is their own side project, not a replacement of The Tenderloins Podcast. The group explained that it was difficult to coordinate the schedules of all four members outside of work, making it challenging to produce their troupe's official podcast with any regularity.

=== Comedy festival ===
In 2025, Quinn held his first ever two-day comedy festival in Key West, Florida called Q West: Comedy Escape. The event returned for its second annual show in April 2026.

== Personal life ==
Quinn has arachnophobia, a fear of spiders. He has three cats, Brooklyn, Boris, and Chessie. Along with that, he has a tattoo that says, "38. Lives alone. Has 3 cats" from the result of a triple punishment on Impractical Jokers in 2014. Quinn has suffered from depression, and has been very open about his struggles throughout the years.

While taking a trip to Germany in 2009, Quinn was arrested for disorderly conduct while visiting Oktoberfest. An assailant punched him in the face, knocking his tooth out. Quinn was escorted back to the United States by German police, and was bailed out by his Tenderloins troupe members.

Some of Quinn’s interests include professional wrestling and reading comics, even having the Superman logo tattooed on his right arm. He is also an avid concert-goer and has stated that he is a fan of the hip hop collective the Wu-Tang Clan.

Since his time on Impractical Jokers, Quinn has donated $50,000 to the New York City Fire Department, and he occasionally meets with his former coworkers. He also regularly attends the Friends of Firefighters Gala in New York, and serves on their advisory council.

In August 2019, Quinn revived the Rubsam & Horrmann Brewing Company on Staten Island.

Quinn has been a Kentucky Colonel since June 15, 2016.

== Filmography ==
Year(s)	Title	Role	Notes
1999	Big Helium Dog	Vance	
1999	Dogma	Man in Airport	Uncredited
2000	Vulgar	Traffic Cop	
2011–present	Impractical Jokers	Himself	Main cast (294 episodes)
2013	Jay & Silent Bob's Super Groovy Cartoon Movie!	Bystander	Voice role
2016	12 Monkeys	Dale	Episode: "Year of the Monkey"
2017	Drunk History	Himself	Episode: "Alexander Graham Bell & James Garfield/The Dambusters"
2017	Victor Crowley	Austin	
2017–2021	Impractical Jokers: After Party	Himself	Main cast (21 episodes)
2019	Tacoma FD	Soup Man	Episode: "Full Moon Fever"
2019	Jay and Silent Bob Reboot	Convention Attendee	
2019–2021	The Misery Index	Himself	Main cast (50 episodes)
2020	Impractical Jokers: The Movie	Himself	
2020	MacGyver	Dale	Episode: "Mac + Desi + Riley + Aubrey"
2020	Loafy	Himself	Voice role, 2 episodes
2020–2021	Impractical Jokers: Dinner Party	Himself	Main cast (18 episodes)
2022	Star Trek: Picard	Dale	Episode: "Watcher"
2022	Clerks III	Auditioner	
2025	Screamboat	Mitch McEverly	
2026	Don't Move	Ranger Wright	
2026	VisionQuest	Dale	Episode: "Deadlock"
