= Clerks III =

2022 comedy film by Kevin Smith

- Theatrical release poster
- Directed by: Kevin Smith
- Written by: Kevin Smith
- Produced by: Liz Destro; Jordan Monsanto
- Starring: Brian O'Halloran; Jeff Anderson; Trevor Fehrman; Austin Zajur; Jason Mewes; Rosario Dawson
- Cinematography: Learan Kahanov
- Edited by: Kevin Smith
- Music by: James L. Venable
- Production companies: Mewesings; Destro Films; SModcast Pictures; View Askew Productions
- Distributed by: Lionsgate
- Release dates: September 4, 2022 (Hackensack Meridian Health Theatre); September 13, 2022 (United States)
- Running time: 100 minutes
- Country: United States
- Language: English
- Budget: $7 million
- Box office: $4.7 million

Clerks III is a 2022 American black comedy drama film written, edited, and directed by Kevin Smith. It is the sequel to Clerks II (2006) and the ninth film in the View Askewniverse. The film stars Brian O'Halloran, Jeff Anderson, Trevor Fehrman, Austin Zajur, Jason Mewes, and Rosario Dawson. In the story, Randal Graves, after surviving a massive heart attack, enlists his friends and fellow clerks Dante Hicks, Elias Grover, and Jay and Silent Bob to make a movie about their lives at the Quick Stop Convenience store that started it all.

Clerks III had its premiere at the Hackensack Meridian Health Theatre in Red Bank, New Jersey on September 4, 2022, and received a two-night limited theatrical release in the United States on September 13 by Lionsgate.

== Plot ==
Fifteen years after Dante and Randal bought the Quick Stop convenience store, (Note: During the events of Clerks II.) the pair's lives continue much as before, including hockey games on the roof and hanging out with Jay and Silent Bob, who have taken over the former RST Video and turned it into a legal marijuana dispensary. Dante is still grieving over the deaths of Becky and their unborn daughter Grace after they were hit by a drunk driver years prior. (Note: The grave marker reads 2006, shortly after the events of Clerks II.)

One day, while Elias and his friend Blockchain are trying to sell their new NFT kites, which contain an image of the Buddy Christ, Randal suffers a severe heart attack. Elias disavows Christianity and decides to become a Satanist after blaming his faith for Randal's heart attack. After the surgery, Randal's doctor urges Dante to keep Randal happy while he recovers and warns him that he is also at risk. Randal decides he has wasted his life and needs a new purpose, declaring he will make a movie about his and Dante's lives at the Quick Stop.

Becky's spirit appears to Dante, encouraging him to move on, and Dante briefly reconnects with his ex-girlfriend, Veronica. After a harrowing audition process, Randal decides he will not only write and direct but also star in the film as himself, alongside Dante in a supporting role. Rather than cast actors, they decide to cast their friends and actual customers to play themselves. This includes Jay, Silent Bob, and Veronica, who agrees after a sexual encounter with Dante. Dante takes on the producer role and convinces his ex-fiancée Emma to lend the production $30,000, with Dante's half of the Quick Stop as collateral. Silent Bob is made the cinematographer, deciding to shoot the movie in black-and-white, while Elias and Blockchain are hired as production assistants.

As the shoot for the tentatively-titled Inconvenience continues, Dante grows exasperated with Randal's micromanagement. Further, Dante is especially hurt by the fact that he is only a minor character in the script. After Randal tries to recreate the donkey show that took place at Mooby's, Dante has a panic attack and leaves the set because the location reminds him of Becky. Later, a drunk Dante finally confronts Randal for never respecting him or acknowledging his support over the years, and for forcing him to relive the loss of his wife and child. Suddenly, he collapses, suffering a heart attack as well.

When Randal decides to leave Dante at the hospital to continue work on the movie, Elias lambastes him for his selfishness and reveals Dante's deal with Emma. Consumed with guilt, Randal finishes editing the movie and sneaks back into the hospital with Jay and Silent Bob's help. He shows Dante the finished film, which he has re-edited so that Dante is the main character, declaring that the story was always about him. Dante watches the film with the spirit of Becky, touched by his friend's effort, before he peacefully dies.

Sometime after Dante's funeral, Emma arrives at the Quick Stop to collect the $30,000 she lent Dante for his half of ownership in the store. Blockchain arrives and excitedly reveals that the NFT kites sold out immediately, yielding a profit of a million dollars. Elias, who has become Randal's best friend in Dante's place, gives Emma $30,000. As Blockchain, Jay, and Silent Bob go outside to fly one of the NFT kites, Randal mourns Dante and is unknowingly joined by his spirit.

During the credits, director Kevin Smith thanks the audience for watching the movie before reading some narration he cut from the final scene, where it is revealed that Randal continued to make movies until the age of 90, while still working at the Quick Stop.

== Cast ==
- Brian O'Halloran as Dante Hicks
- Jeff Anderson as Randal Graves
- Marilyn Ghigliotti as Veronica Loughran
- Rosario Dawson as Becky Scott
- Trevor Fehrman as Elias Grover
- Jason Mewes as Jay
- Kevin Smith as Silent Bob
- Amy Sedaris as Doctor Ladenheim
- Austin Zajur as Blockchain Coltrane
- Jennifer Schwalbach Smith as Emma Bunting
- Harley Quinn Smith as Millennium "Milly" Faulken
- Ben Affleck as Boston John
- Michelle Buteau as Lisa
- Marc Bernardin as Lando
- Kate Micucci as Mary
- Justin Long as Orderly

Additionally, Fred Armisen, Sarah Michelle Gellar, Freddie Prinze Jr., Bobby Moynihan, Melissa Benoist, Chris Wood, Anthony Michael Hall, Danny Trejo, Ralph Garman, and Impractical Jokers' Brian Quinn, Sal Vulcano, James Murray, and Joe Gatto all appear as actors auditioning for Inconvenience. Various customers from the original Clerks reprise their roles for Inconvenience. Other View Askew alumni cameos include John Willyung reprising his role as Cohee Lundin from Chasing Amy, as well as Scott Mosier and Ethan Suplee each reprising their role of Willam Black from Clerks and Mallrats. Smith's mother Grace, who played the Milk Maid in previous Clerks films, appears as an auditioner who is offended by the screenplay and declares the screenwriter's mother should be ashamed of them. Jake Richardson also appears as an auditioner, having previously played one of Jay and Silent Bob's customers alongside Suplee in Clerks II.

== Production ==
=== Development ===
During press for Clerks II, Kevin Smith briefly discussed the possibility of a Clerks III. Stating that "if there's ever gonna be a Clerks III, it would be somewhere down the road in my 40s or 50s, when it might be interesting to check back in on Dante and Randal. But I don't know about Jay and Bob so much, 'cause at 45, leaning on a wall in front of a convenience store might be a little sad." Smith repeated this sentiment on one of the audio commentary tracks on the Clerks II DVD, to which Jeff Anderson jokingly replied, "Oh, don't get me started", referring to Anderson's well known doubts about making Clerks II when first approached by Smith.

On March 29, 2012, Smith expressed his interest in producing Clerks III as a Broadway play after seeing the Theresa Rebeck comedy Seminar starring Alan Rickman, with whom Smith had previously worked on Dogma.

On December 10, 2012, Smith released a special Hollywood Babble-On episode, Hollywood Babble-On #000: GIANT SIZED ANNUAL # 1: CLERKS III, AUDIENCE 0, in which he revealed greater details on his plans for Clerks III. Smith stated that an ongoing audit over residuals from Clerks II with The Weinstein Company (TWC) was causing a delay in several key Clerks III cast and crew members, including Anderson and Scott Mosier, from coming on board until the audit was resolved. Smith also revealed that he would like to crowdfund Clerks III, either through Kickstarter or Indiegogo, with contributors receiving anything from DVDs, posters, and even roles as extras in the film. On June 5, 2013, he changed his mind on crowdsourcing, stating "I've got access to money. And worst-case scenario, I can put up my house."

==== Original script (2013–2017) ====
Smith worked on a script for Clerks III from March to May 2013, stating when he completed it that it was "The Empire Strikes Back" of the series. This script featured a story about Randal having a nervous breakdown after the Quick Stop is destroyed during Hurricane Sandy, and trying to manage it by getting in line for a film called Ranger Danger a year before it opens. Randal would have gained a small cult following and set up his own miniature Quick Stop, only for there to be a shooting at the theater. In July 2013, Jason Mewes stated that they were now just waiting to hear back from TWC about funding.

On September 26, 2014, Smith stated on his Hollywood Babble-On podcast that he was glad that he made Tusk, so he could go on to make Clerks III:

Everything in my life would suck right now if I hadn't made that movie. I'm back in movies now. I've got three lined up, and this is the fucking grand news. Tusk was the absolute bridge to Clerks III. Because of Tusk, I got my financing for Clerks III. A year and change ago, I was trying to fucking desperately get Clerks III made for the 20th anniversary. And that desperation, I must have reeked of it, because I couldn't fucking find money and shit. But it was Tusk, it was people going 'Holy fuck! What else do you have?' And I was like, Clerks III, done. So, everybody that's like, 'He failed, he failed,' thank you - I failed into Clerks III. So, never trust anybody when they tell you how your story goes, man. You know your story. You write your own story.

Filming was initially scheduled for in May 2015, but the production was put on hold to film another sequel, Mallrats 2. However, by June 2016, the plans for a Mallrats sequel had been turned into plans for a Mallrats TV series.

==== Production stalls ====
The initial plans to film Clerks III came to a halt in 2017, when Smith announced that one of the four leads, whom he later revealed to be Anderson, opted out of reprising his role despite a completed script. At the time, Smith doubted the film would ever be made. In 2018, Smith suffered a near-fatal heart attack after one of his comedy shows. This experience inspired him to rewrite the Clerks III script from scratch, doing away with the original planned storyline. Smith later reflected that the original script strayed too far from the original Clerks, noting it was written by "a guy who didn't know a thing about death" and he was ultimately glad it was never made. Smith later reused the original opening scene, featuring Jay and Silent Bob getting arrested (alongside Dante and Randal in the original Clerks III script) for Jay and Silent Bob Reboot.

In July 2019, Smith announced that he would do a live reading of the original, now-aborted Clerks III script at the First Avenue Playhouse in Atlantic Highlands, New Jersey. The reading was held on August 3, 2019. That same month, Smith revealed at San Diego Comic Con that he was writing a new script for Clerks III and promised to make the film.

==== New script (2019) ====
On October 1, 2019, Smith confirmed on Instagram that Clerks III was happening and that Jeff Anderson agreed to reprise his role as Randal.

It'll be a movie that concludes a saga. It'll be a movie about how you're never too old to completely change your life. It'll be a movie about how a decades-spanning friendship finally confronts the future. It'll be a movie that brings us back to the beginning—a return to the cradle of civilization in the great state of #newjersey. It'll be a movie that stars Jeff and @briancohalloran, with me and Jay in supporting roles. And it'll be a movie called CLERKS III!

The new script follows Randal, after surviving a heart attack, and Dante making a movie about their lives at the store, a plot initially conceived as a film adaptation of Clerks: The Animated Series titled Clerks: Sell Out.

In January 2021, Smith announced the script was complete. In July 2021, Lionsgate obtained the rights to produce and distribute the film, while also confirming Rosario Dawson and Trevor Fehrman would reprise their roles of Becky Scott and Elias Grover from Clerks II respectively.

=== Filming ===
Principal photography began on August 2, 2021, in Red Bank, New Jersey. Filming wrapped on August 31, 2021.

=== Post-production ===
Post-production was completed on February 13, 2022, with Smith announcing a trailer was slated to debut in May. On May 28, 2022, Smith stated he viewed the first cut of the trailer and was set to release it during San Diego Comic-Con 2022, which would run from July 21–24. On June 29, 2022, Smith announced the trailer would instead drop online on July 6.

The film is dedicated to Lisa Spoonauer, who played Caitlin Bree in the original Clerks and Clerks: The Animated Series. Spoonauer died in 2017.

== Release ==
Clerks III had its world premiere on August 24, 2022, in Los Angeles, followed by a roadshow tour that began September 4, 2022, in Red Bank, New Jersey. It was released on September 13, 2022, by Lionsgate and Fathom Events. The film was previously scheduled for release in July 2022. The film had a limited release on September 16 in the United Kingdom.

=== Home media ===
The film released digitally on October 14, 2022, and was released on 4K Ultra HD, Blu-ray and DVD on December 6, 2022.

== Reception ==
On review aggregator website Rotten Tomatoes, Clerks III has an approval rating of 63% based on 126 reviews, with an average rating of 6/10. The site's critics consensus reads: "Clerks III isn't even supposed to be here today – but this surprisingly emotional return to the Quick Stop wraps up the trilogy in fan-pleasing fashion." Metacritic assigned the film a weighted average score of 50 out of 100, based on 25 critics, indicating "mixed or average" reviews.
