= Joe Gatto =

American comedian (born 1976)

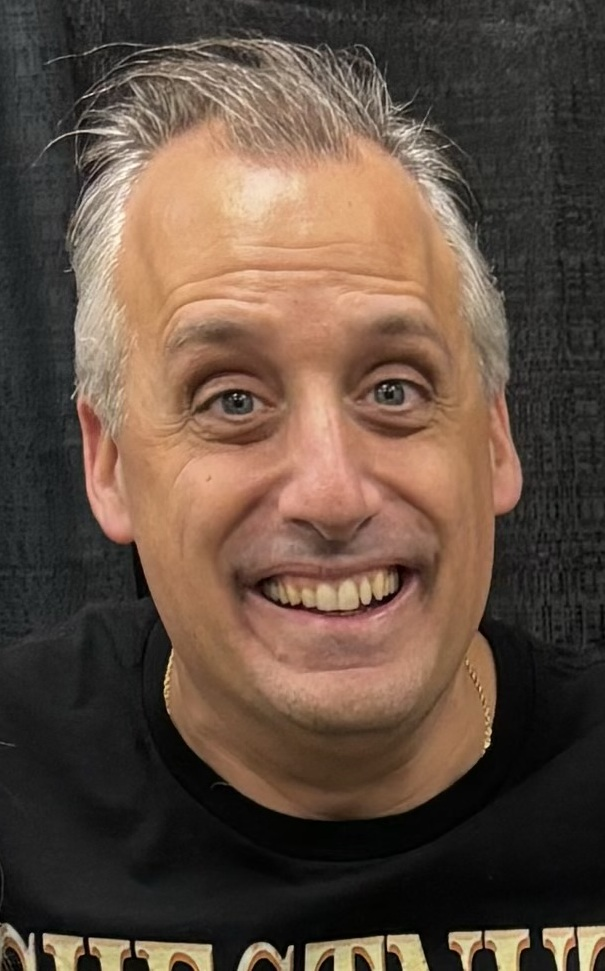
- Gatto in December 2024
- Born: Joseph Gatto; June 5, 1976 (age 50); Staten Island, New York City, U.S.
- Education: LIU Post (BS)
- Occupations: Comedian; actor
- Years active: 1998–present
- Spouse: Bessy Gatto (m. 2013) (Note: Separated 2021, reconciled 2023)
- Children: 2
- Joe Gatto's voice Gatto explains Impractical Jokers during an interview in 2013.

Joseph Anthony Gatto Jr. (born June 5, 1976) is an American improvisational comedian, actor, and producer. He is a former member of The Tenderloins, a comedy troupe originally consisting of himself, Sal Vulcano, James Murray, and Brian Quinn. Along with the other members of the Tenderloins, Gatto starred in the comedy television series Impractical Jokers, which first aired on TruTV in December 2011.

== Early life ==
Joseph Anthony Gatto Jr was born on June 5, 1976 in Staten Island and is of Italian descent. Gatto attended Monsignor Farrell High School. Along with Murray, Vulcano, and Quinn, he was a member of his high school's Improvisation Club. He studied at LIU Post, where he received a degree in accounting. Gatto's father died in September 1995 from pancreatic cancer.

== Career ==
=== Early career ===
After being apart for four years, Murray, Gatto, and Vulcano reunited after graduating from college and began practicing improvisation at Gatto's house, going on to tour as an improv and sketch comedy troupe in 1998, calling themselves the Tenderloins.

The Tenderloins began producing comedy sketches together, posting them on YouTube, Myspace, and Metacafe, accumulating millions of views online. In 2007, the troupe won the $100,000 grand prize in the NBC It's Your Show competition for the sketch "Time Thugs".

=== Impractical Jokers and other television shows ===
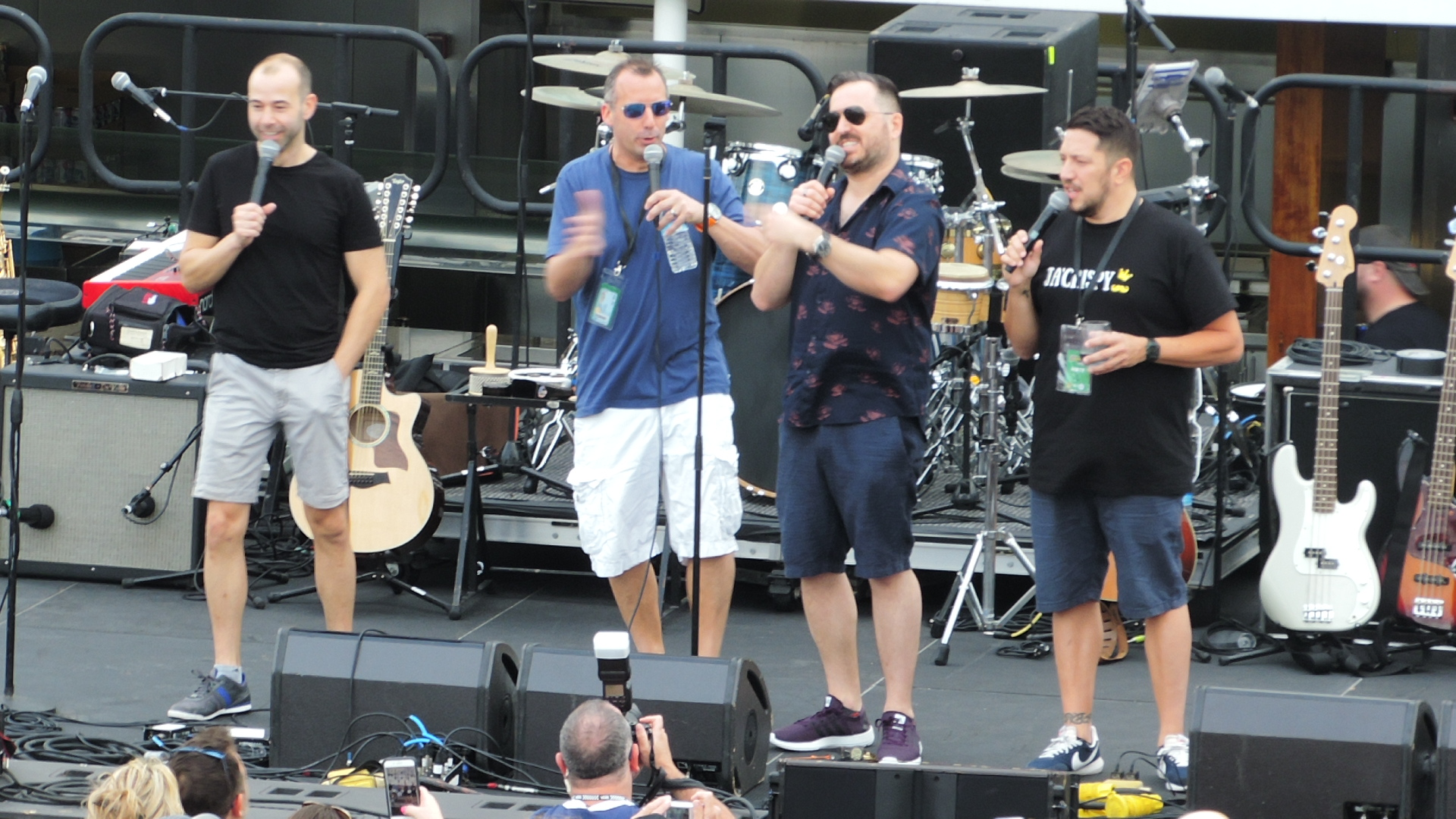
The Tenderloins performing in New Orleans in November 2017. From left to right: James Murray, Gatto, Brian Quinn, and Sal Vulcano.

Impractical Jokers premiered on December 15, 2011, on TruTV. The first season was watched by over 32 million viewers. The series quickly became the most popular program on TruTV throughout the 2010s and boosted Gatto into the public eye. Gatto and the rest of the tenderloins also began doing Impractical Jokers performances (live comedy tours) in 2012.

In 2017, Gatto played Officer Larry in an episode of 12 Monkeys titled "Causality".

In October 2019, Gatto, along with the other members of the Tenderloins, starred in The Misery Index, which is hosted by Jameela Jamil and is based on Andy Breckman's card game "Shit Happens".

On February 21, 2020, Impractical Jokers: The Movie was released, which featured the Tenderloins.

From 2020 to 2021, Gatto appeared on Impractical Jokers: Dinner Party, a spin-off of Impractical Jokers in which the Tenderloins do a video group chat while eating dinner and having guests visit one or more participants. Gatto, along with fellow members of the Tenderloins, all made cameo appearances in the 2022 film Clerks III.

On December 31, 2021, Gatto announced he was amicably leaving the cast of Impractical Jokers and the Tenderloins to focus more on co-parenting his children, after a then-split with his wife. He stated: "However, due to some issues in my personal life, I have to step away. Bessy and I have decided to amicably part ways, so now I need to focus on being the best father and co-parent to our two incredible kids." The couple reconciled in September 2023.

In May 2023, Gatto made a guest appearance at an Impractical Jokers performance in Boston, Massachusetts. On August 25, 2024, the Impractical Jokers wrapped up a two-year long tour in Hanover, Maryland at Live! Casino & Hotel; Gatto made a surprise appearance towards the end of the show.

=== The Tenderloins Podcast ===
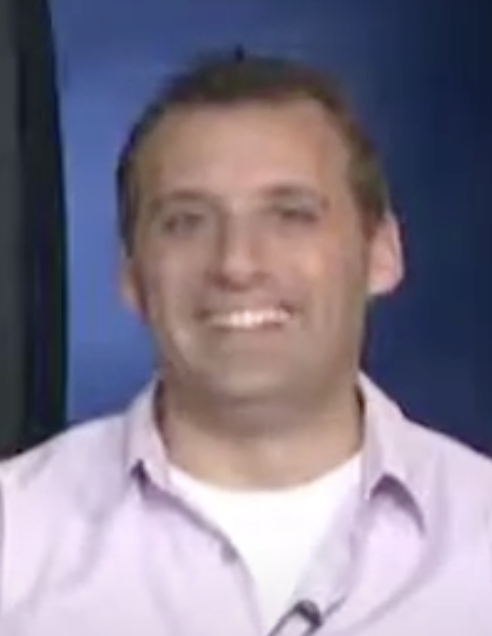
Gatto in September 2013

The Tenderloins hosted a podcast from April 2012 to 2013. It is available on their official website and on iTunes.

=== Two Cool Moms ===
Since March 1, 2022, Gatto has been co-hosting the weekly Two Cool Moms podcast, along with comedian Steve Byrne. The podcast's name derives from the two describing their mothers as "strong, opinionated mothers who gave great advice". The podcast focuses on the two giving advice to strangers who submit a problem they're facing.

=== Books ===
On August 26, 2020, Gatto published a book titled The Dogfather: My Love for Dogs, Dessert and Growing Up Italian. The book mainly focuses on stories about Gatto's dogs, him growing up in an Italian American household, and his love for Italian food. He named his past fourteen dogs after food: Cannoli, Biscotti, Spumoni, Napoleon, Cotta, Struffoli, Tortoni, Fettuccine Alfredo, Gnocchi, Tiramisu, Burrata, Gelato, Calzone, and Nutella.

In September 2024, he released a picture book for kids, titled Where's Bearry?

=== Stand-up career ===
After leaving Impractical Jokers, Gatto ventured into solo stand-up comedy. This initially served as a way for him to keep performing and earning, but quickly turned into a passion-driven endeavor. On September 17, 2024, he released his first comedy special, Messing With People.

== Personal life ==
Gatto and his wife Bessy have two children. The couple separated amicably in December 2021, but reconciled in September 2023.

Gatto is an advocate for the "Adopt, Don't Shop" movement, encouraging people to adopt pets from shelters rather than purchase them from breeders. He has had fourteen dogs. Gatto and his wife run a non-profit Long Island based dog rescue shelter, called Cannoli's Sweet Life.

Gatto actively campaigns against bullying, and his content dealing with the issue includes various YouTube segments.

He has been a Kentucky Colonel since June 15, 2016.

He is a teetotaler as well as a vegetarian.

In May 2017, Gatto was given the Champion of Hope Award by the Daniel Music Foundation, for using his status to help promote programs and benefits for people who suffer from disabilities.

=== Sexual assault allegation ===
On March 20, 2025, a woman on TikTok posted a number of allegations against Gatto, including that he sexually assaulted her in September 2023 when he was 47 and she was 19. Gatto denied the allegations, saying: "I have used poor judgment and, as a result, have violated the trust of the people I love most. But anyone who knows me at all knows full well that I wouldn't assault anyone." Gatto cancelled the remainder of his tour on March 26, and announced he would be entering an in-patient facility. On May 1, 2025, a spokesperson announced that he had completed the treatment and was no longer at the treatment center. On August 15, Gatto returned to social media, announcing his return in an Instagram story after five months of being offline.

== Filmography ==
Year(s)	Title	Role	Notes
2011–2021	Impractical Jokers	Himself	Main cast (239 episodes)
2017	12 Monkeys	Officer Larry	Episode: "Causality"
2017–2021	Impractical Jokers: After Party	Himself	Main cast (29 episodes)
2019–2021	The Misery Index	Himself	Main cast (50 episodes)
2020–2021	Impractical Jokers: Dinner Party	Himself	Main cast (18 episodes)
2020	Impractical Jokers: The Movie	Himself	
2020	MacGyver	Larry	Episode: "Mac + Desi + Riley + Aubrey"
2020	Loafy	Himself	Voice role, 2 episodes
2022	Clerks III	Auditioner	
2024	Messing with People	Himself	Television special
2024	Adam Ray Is Dr. Phil Unleashed	Himself	Television special

== Bibliography ==
Year	Title
2020	The Dogfather: My Love for Dogs, Dessert and Growing Up Italian
2024	Where's Bearry?
