= Monsignor Farrell High School =

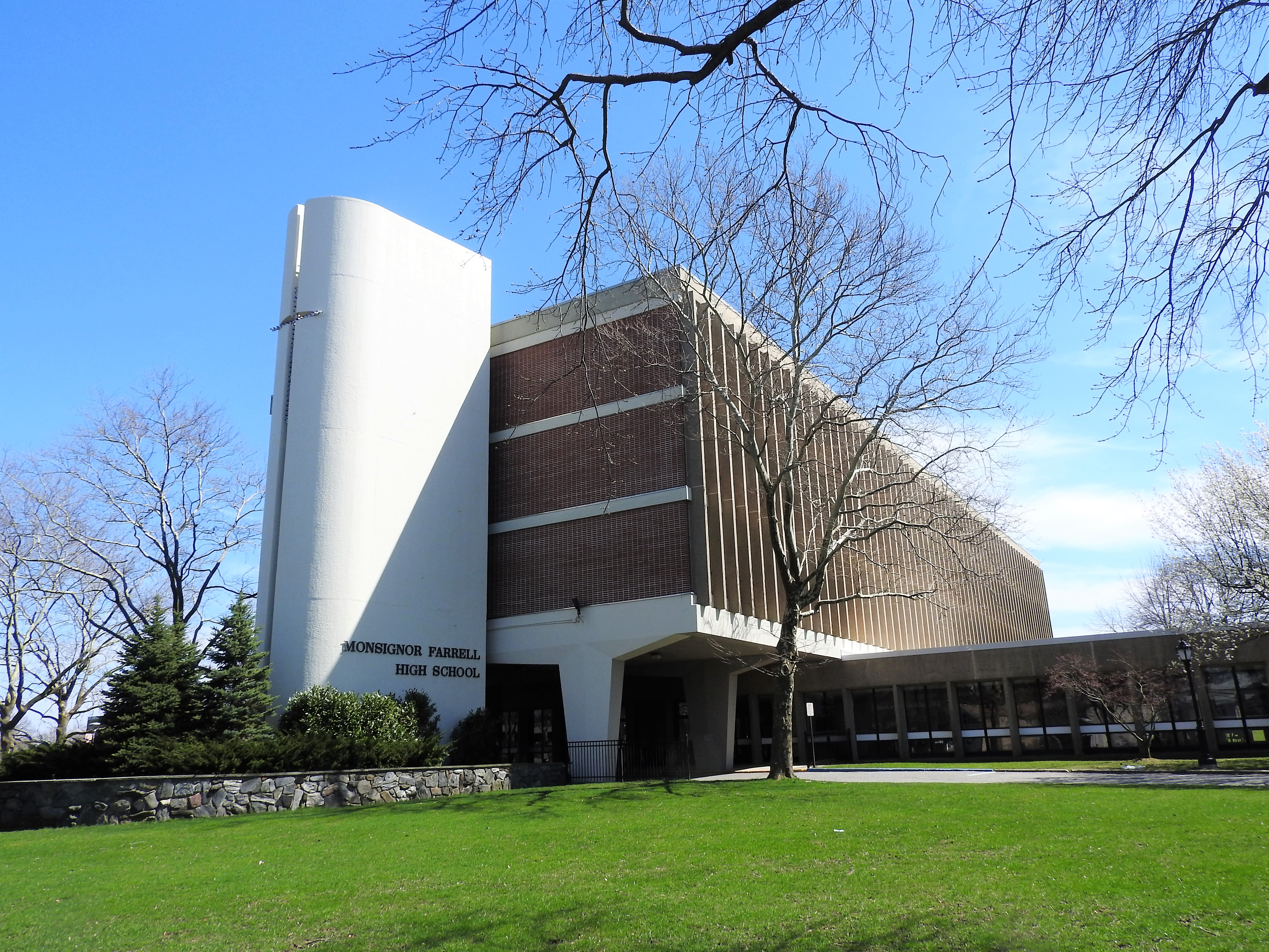

Location
- 2900 Amboy Road; Staten Island, New York 10306; United States; 40°34′2″N 74°7′32″W

Information
- Type: Private
- Motto: Vir Fidelis (Faithful Man)
- Religious affiliation: Catholic
- Established: 1961 (65 years ago)
- President: Louis R. Tobacco
- Principal: Lawrence Musanti
- Grades: 9–12
- Enrollment: 800 (2014)
- Colors: Maroon and gold
- Athletics conference: Catholic High School Athletic Association
- Mascot: Lion
- Accreditation: Middle States Association of Colleges and Schools
- Newspaper: The Lion
- Yearbook: Cornerstone
- Affiliation: Archdiocese of New York
- Website: msgrfarrellhs.org

Monsignor Farrell High School is a Catholic high school for boys, located in the Oakwood section of Staten Island, New York, United States. Opened in 1961, the school is named in honor of Monsignor Joseph Farrell, a Catholic priest, as well as a religious, political and community leader on Staten Island.

== In pop culture ==
In 1985, filming for the music video of Billy Joel’s top ten hit song You're Only Human (Second Wind), took place outside of the school’s main entrance.

== Notable alumni ==
- Bill Britton (born 1955, class of 1974) – former PGA Tour player
- David Carr (born 1987, class of 2005) – member, New York City Council
- Christopher Celenza (born 1967, class of 1985) – James B. Knapp Dean, Zanvyl Krieger School of Arts and Sciences, Johns Hopkins University; former dean, Georgetown College at Georgetown University
- Tom Cosgrove (born 1996, class of 2014) – pitcher, San Diego Padres
- Kevin Coyle (born 1956) – former defensive coordinator, Miami Dolphins
- Michael Cusick (born 1969) – New York State Assemblyman
- Dan Donovan (born 1956) – former U.S. Congressman from New York; former District Attorney of Richmond County
- Vito Fossella (born 1965) – former U.S. Congressman from New York; Staten Island Borough President
- Joe Gambardella (born 1993, class of 2011) – professional ice hockey player, Utica Comets of the American Hockey League (as a prospect for the New Jersey Devils of the National Hockey League)
- Joe Gatto (born 1976, class of 1994) – cast member, Impractical Jokers
- Paul C. Genereux (born 1950, class of 1968) – US Army brigadier general
- Andrew Lanza (born 1964, class of 1982) – lawyer; Republican politician; member, New York State Senate, representing the 24th District which encompasses most of Staten Island
- John Lavelle (born 1981) – actor and playwright
- Pete Lembo (born 1970, class of 1988) – head football coach, University at Buffalo
- Michael McMahon (born 1957) – former U.S. Congressman; District Attorney of Richmond County
- James Murray (born 1976, class of 1994) – cast member, Impractical Jokers
- Kevin O'Connor – former general manager, Utah Jazz
- James Oddo (born 1966) – former Staten Island Borough President; former New York City Councilman
- Brian Quinn (born 1976, class of 1994) – cast member, Impractical Jokers
- Theo Rossi (born 1975, class of 1993) – actor
- Ryan Rossiter (born 1989) – professional basketball player
- Michael Tannousis – New York State Assemblyman
- William J. Taverner – sex educator; editor, American Journal of Sexuality Education
- Louis R. Tobacco (born 1972, class of 1990) – president, Monsignor Farrell High School; former New York State Assemblyman
- Sal Vulcano (born 1976, class of 1994) – cast member, Impractical Jokers
- Edmund Whalen (born 1958, class of 1976) – auxiliary bishop, Archdiocese of New York; former principal, Monsignor Farrell High School
- John Wolyniec (born 1977, class of 1995) – former Major League Soccer player
