= Loafy =

American adult animated comedy series of animated shorts

- Genre: Adult animation Animated comedy
- Created by: Bobby Moynihan
- Written by: Bobby Moynihan
- Directed by: Bobby Moynihan
- Creative director: Frank Angones
- Starring: Bobby Moynihan; Jason Mewes; Eugene Cordero; Gina Gershon; Cecily Strong; Jay Pharoah
- Composer: Hunter Berk (Note: Uncredited; credited as sound designer)
- Country of origin: United States
- Original language: English
- No. of seasons: 1
- No. of episodes: 8

Production
- Executive producers: Bobby Moynihan; Luke Kelly-Clyne; Kevin Healey
- Producers: Travis LaSalle; Alex Edge
- Animator: Angela De Vito
- Editor: Alex Mauboussin
- Running time: 9-11 minutes
- Production companies: Cartuna; Big Breakfast

Original release
- Network: Comedy Central
- Release: August 8 – September 5, 2020

Loafy is an American adult animated web series created by former SNL cast member and comedian Bobby Moynihan and made by Cartuna, which partnered with the company, Big Breakfast. It premiered on Comedy Central's digital platforms on August 8, 2020.

== Plot ==
This series is a comedy about a "weed-dealing manatee who runs a drug empire" while in his water tank at the Center Park Zoo, a run-down zoo which is adjacent to the Central Park Zoo.

== Cast and characters ==
=== Main ===
- Bobby Moynihan as Loafy, a manatee who smokes weed and runs a drug empire from his Center Park Zoo tank. Moynihan also voices a character named Beauregard, who has an extreme humpback.
- Jason Mewes as Neck, a stoner masai giraffe and friend of Loafy.

=== Recurring ===
- Ron Funches as Beef, Loafy's son, who he is trying to raise money for.
- Gina Gershon as Slippy Parker, a chimpanzee and friend of Loafy. Moynihan called her perfect for the part.
- Cecily Strong as Becca, a human woman who is Loafy's caretaker and girlfriend.
- Eugene Cordero as Scrooge, a "horny" tarsier who is Eli's ex.
- Will McLaughlin as Colonel, a bald eagle who wears a hat emblazoned with a U.S. flag.
- Shannon O’Neill as Penelope, an emperor penguin.
- Jay Pharoah as Zookeeper Dan. Pharoah also voices a character which looks like Will Smith.
- Tom Green as Homeless Guy, a beggar who has a pet rat.
- Eli Newell as Eli, Scrooge's human ex.
- Kevin Smith as Mar Camel, a camel whose name is a play off Mark Hamill.

=== Guests ===
- Taran Killam as Punk Kid #2 and Hypnotist Hwayne
- Nina West as Gloria
- Hannah Simone as Simone, a reticulated python
- Joe Gatto as himself
- Brian Quinn as himself
- Sal Vulcano as himself

== Production ==
=== Development ===
In an interview with Helen Raptis of AM Northwest in August 2020, Moynihan said he is a fan of manatees and he wanted to "try something in animation" where he could mix improvisation and animation together. He was inspired by a show he loved as a kid, Dr. Katz on Comedy Central, and that similarly, Loafy can't go anywhere, saying that "what better person to talk to than your weed dealer?" In the same interview, he stated that 75% of the series was completed before the COVID pandemic, including recording all the other cast "two days before the lockdown" in New York City. He clarified that "Loafy was recorded before the pandemic," but made and animated remotely after the pandemic. He said that he wanted to make a "fun thing to make people laugh."

The same month, Moynihan, in another interview, said that he has always loved manatees, that his wife adopted a manatee for him for one Christmas named Chessie, which was "the first manatee found in the Chesapeake Bay". He further stated that the idea for the show came about after he did UnMade for IMDb, and voiced a manatee in that short. He additionally stated that the concept for the show made him laugh, with people breaking into a "really shitty zoo" next to the Central Park Zoo to get their weed, and said he really did the show because he missed improvising with his friends and loves animation, so he wanted to mix both. He stated that those who don't smoke weed will enjoy the "comedy and improv and lots of fun comedians and amazingly talented people," but for those who smoke weed "it’ll help tremendously." He also stated he found it fun "make up dumb weed names" and stated that he was happy to do it on a small level, noting the show gets "weirder" from episode to episode, evolving into something he is ultimately satisfied with.

=== Release ===
In late October 2019, it was reported that Comedy Central had ordered eight episodes of the show, with Moynihan noted as writer, creator, and executive producer, along with green lighting other shows. Steve Elliott, Comedy Central's VP of Digital Original Development, said at the time that the "world needs a weed-dealing manatee and more Bobby Moynihan — not necessarily in that order." Each episode is composed of a 5-6 minute short and a behind-the-scenes segment.

=== Crew ===
The show is produced by Cartuna, a New York animation studio. The head of the company, Big Breakfast, Luke Kelly-Clyne, is an executive producer on the show.

=== Casting ===
In an interview, Moynihan stated that he asked friends who were either "SNL Buddies" or part of the Upright Citizens Brigade and other people he hadn't worked with in the past to voice characters on the show and that they would give them a "loose basis," would "play around," then edit it down into manageable clips which would be used in the episodes. In another interview, Moynihan called most of the cast members "very, very close friends of mine" that he wanted to work with people on the show, while he met Gina Gershon and Tom Green in the past, saying that Green was fantastic and "knocked it out of the park" with his performance. Those on the cast, apart from Moynihan, Gershon, and Green, included Cecily Strong, Taran Killam, Jay Pharaoh, and Jason Mewes, among many others.
