= Shooting Clerks =

2023 film directed by Christopher Downie

- Film poster
- Directed by: Christopher Downie
- Written by: Christopher Downie
- Produced by: Brett Murray; Felix Kay; Ryan James; Sav Rodgers
- Starring: Kevin Smith; Mark Frost; Brian O'Halloran; Matthew Postlethwaite; Chris Bain; Scott Schiaffo; Harry Mitchell; Jason Mewes
- Cinematography: Christopher Downie
- Edited by: Christopher Downie
- Music by: Honah Lee
- Production companies: Auld Reekie Media; Pink Plaid; Professional Amateur Productions
- Distributed by: Anchor Bay Entertainment
- Release date: August 13, 2023
- Countries: United Kingdom; United States
- Language: English

Shooting Clerks is a 2023 biographical comedy-drama film directed by Christopher Downie and starring Brian O'Halloran, Mark Frost, Jason Mewes, Scott Schiaffo, Matthew Postlethwaite and Kevin Smith. It was produced by Auld Reekie Media. It had a preview screening in Orlando, Florida, on October 22, 2016. The film had a special screening in Kevin Smith's home town of Atlantic Highlands, New Jersey, on November 11, 2016.

The film had an advance UK screening at the Prince Charles Cinema, London, on January 16, 2018.

The film was given a special advance screening at San Diego Comic-Con on July 20, 2019, in celebration of the 25th anniversary of the release of Clerks.

== Summary ==
A biographical dramedy detailing how Kevin Smith bankrolled his $27,000 first film with maxed-out credit cards and garnered career-making critical attention at the Sundance Film Festival when Clerks debuted there in 1994.

== Cast ==
- Kevin Smith as Larkin Eve
- Mark Frost as Kevin Smith / Silent Bob
- Brian O'Halloran as Elis Heimermann
- Marilyn Ghigliotti as Ali Thomlyn
- Matthew Postlethwaite as Walt Flanagan
- Jason Mewes as Martmeister Lars
- Jake Richardson as Marty Marty
- Scott Schiaffo as Don Smith
- Beverley Longhurst as Grace Smith
- Ernest O'Donnell as Sergeant Svenning
- Brett Murray as Bryan Johnson
- Christopher Downie as Alex Sanderson
- Chris Bain as Jason Mewes / Jay
- Harry Mitchell as Scott Mosier
- Jay Booton as David Klein
- James Rolfe as Leonard James Nash
- Dale Murray as Vincent Pereira
- Bryan Johnson as Comic Book Horndog
- Walt Flanagan as Comic Book Steve
- Ming Chen as Comic Book Clerk
- Mike Zapcic as Comic Book Dave
- Johnny Glasgow as Ernest O'Donnell
- Kit Alexander as Brian O'Halloran / Dante Hicks
- Tom Sullivan as Jeff Anderson / Randal Graves
- Harry Partridge as Usher / Kilgar / Hogstrong
- Lee Bendick as Impatient Customer
- Sanjeev Kohli as Dr. Jared Patel
- Mike Matei as Festival Programmer
- Kyle Hebert as Kay Theater Announcer
- Ashley Grazino as Marilyn Ghigliotti / Veronica Loughran
- Stephanie Price as Lisa Spoonauer / Caitlin Bree
- Bern Cohen as Thomas Burke

== Production ==
The original Indiegogo fundraiser, set up to fund the project, reached 9% (£2,540) of its target. Two additional fundraisers, one for finishing funds, the other for post-production, reached 103% (US$3,605) and 109% (US$2,120), respectively. Filming took place in St Andrews, Scotland, Florida, and New Jersey.

On March 27, 2016, the teaser trailer was released.

In September 2016, the trailer for the film was released.

== Reception ==
=== Awards ===
The film won the Orlando Film Festival Indie Spirit Award and the "Audience Choice Feature Film" at the Monmouth Film Festival.

== Release ==
Shooting Clerks had a preview screening in Orlando, Florida, on October 22, 2016. The film had a special screening in Kevin Smith's hometown of Atlantic Highlands, New Jersey, on November 11, 2016.

On January 16, 2018, the film had an advance screening at the Prince Charles Cinema, London.

On July 20, 2019, a rough cut of the film was screened at San Diego Comic-Con, in celebration of the 25th anniversary of Clerks' release.

The final cut premiered on August 13, 2023, in Atlantic Highlands.
