= Mike Zapcic =

American actor

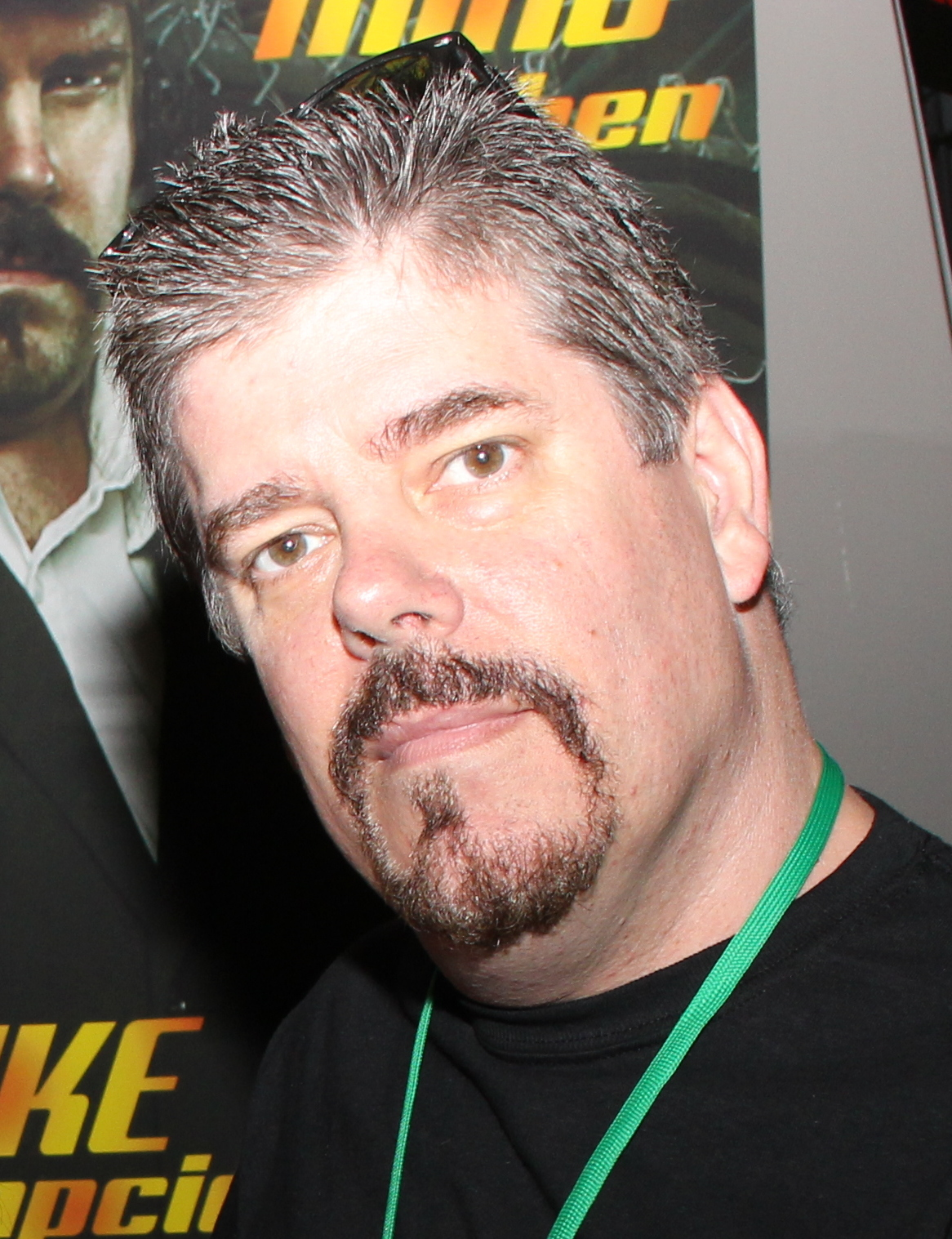
- Zapcic at the Florida Supercon in 2013
- Born: Michael Zapcic
- Occupations: Actor, podcaster
- Years active: 2012–present

Michael Zapcic, often referred to as Mike Zapcic or Chief, is a podcaster and cast member of the AMC reality TV show Comic Book Men with Kevin Smith.

== Early life ==
Inspired by Dr. Seuss books at age three, Zapcic later became interested in comic books of all variety and acquired an extensive knowledge in that area. After going to culinary school and working as a cook, he was hired by Walt Flanagan to work in Kevin Smith's comic book store Jay and Silent Bob's Secret Stash in Red Bank, New Jersey.

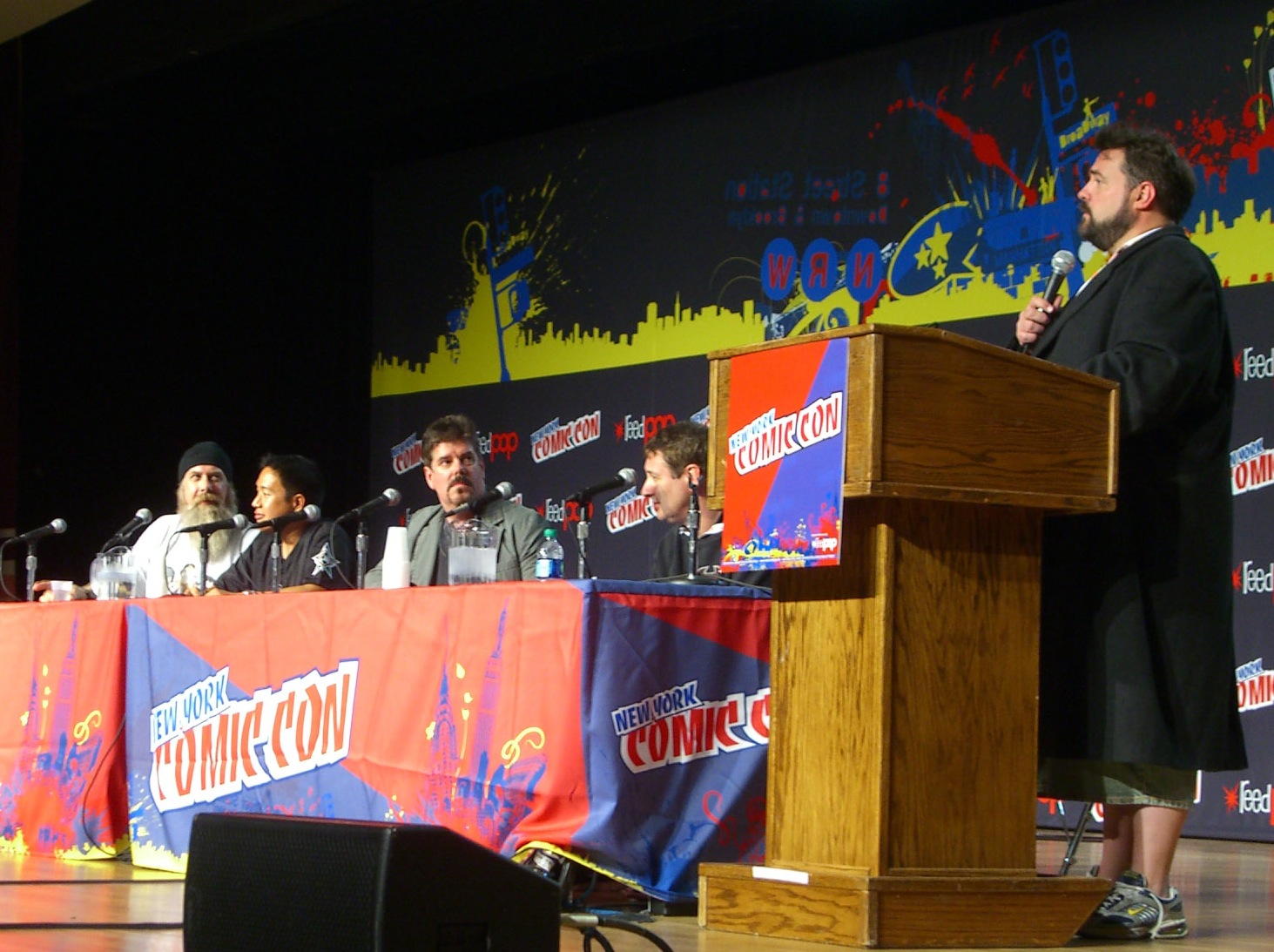
Zapcic, middle, with the cast of Comic Book Men.

== Career ==
When the podcast Tell 'Em Steve-Dave!—hosted by: Bryan Johnson, Walt Flanagan, and Brian Quinn—spawned the television reality show Comic Book Men in 2012, Mike Zapcic became a main cast member.

In 2014 he started a podcast of his own together with his partner and colleague Ming Chen. The weekly show I Sell Comics is hosted on the SModcast Podcast Network and deals with news and developments in the comic book world, as well as general topics.

Subsequently, Chen and Zapcic opened a podcast studio named A Shared Universe PodcaStudio in Eatontown, New Jersey.

== Personal life ==
Zapcic lives with his wife Julia and their two sons in Long Branch, New Jersey.

== Filmography ==
- Jay & Silent Bob's Super Groovy Cartoon Movie (2013) (Voice) as Bank Robber Cop 2
- Shooting Clerks (2016) as Comic Book Dave
- Burn in Hell (2018)
- Jay and Silent Bob Reboot (2019) as himself

== Television ==
- Comic Book Men (2012-2018) (Himself)
