= Jay & Silent Bob's Super Groovy Cartoon Movie! =

- Theatrical release poster
- Directed by: Steve Stark
- Written by: Kevin Smith
- Based on: Bluntman and Chronic by Kevin Smith and Mike Allred
- Produced by: Jason Mewes; Jordan Monsanto
- Starring: Jason Mewes; Kevin Smith; Eliza Dushku; Tara Strong; Ralph Garman; Neil Gaiman; Ben Gleib; Jon Lovitz
- Edited by: Josh Earl
- Music by: James L. Venable
- Production companies: SModcast Pictures; View Askew Productions
- Distributed by: Phase 4 Films
- Release date: April 20, 2013
- Running time: 64 minutes
- Country: United States
- Language: English
- Budget: $69,000

Jay & Silent Bob's Super Groovy Cartoon Movie! is a 2013 American adult animated superhero comedy film written by Kevin Smith, directed (and co-animated) by Steve Stark, and produced by Jason Mewes and Jordan Monsanto. The film's script was adapted from the Bluntman And Chronic comic book story originally written by Smith as a companion piece to his 2001 film Jay and Silent Bob Strike Back and it is the seventh film in the View Askewniverse.

== Plot ==
After winning $10,000,000 from a scratchcard they bought at the Quick Stop, Jay & Silent Bob decide to become superheroes Bluntman and Chronic (a parody of Batman and Robin). They build a secret Fortress of Solitude beneath RST Video and acquire all the necessary gadgets and accessories to make them ideal crime-fighters. They also hire their own butler, Albert (a parody of Alfred Pennyworth).

Throughout their crime-fighting ordeals, they manage to accidentally create a few super-powered enemies of their own, who together form "The League of Shitters". The League of Shitters consists of Lipstick Lesbian, Dickhead, NewsGroup, Cocknocker, and the Diddler. While at a ceremony in which Bluntman and Chronic are to be awarded the key to the city of Red Bank, The League of Shitters attack the dynamic duo and knock them unconscious. They then attempt to infiltrate the "Bluntcave", resulting in the deaths of NewsGroup and Diddler (they are crushed by a wall that reveals the entrance to the hideout). Lipstick Lesbian mortally stabs Albert in the back and places Bluntman and Chronic into a giant bong that is slowly filling up with water. After leaving the heroes to die, the villains descend upon Red Bank, killing everyone in their path. Albert uses the last of his strength to free the heroes before dying.

Vowing to avenge Albert, Bluntman and Chronic fly to Red Bank in the Blunt Jet to save the city from The League of Shitters' mayhem. An epic fight ensues in which Bluntman subdues Dickhead by tricking him into entering a gay bar and Chronic kills Cocknocker with a broken beer bottle. Lipstick Lesbian draws a gun and attempts to shoot Bluntman and Chronic, but they are miraculously saved by a new heroine, Bluntgirl. Bluntgirl defeats Lipstick Lesbian single-handedly and begins to show romantic interest in Bluntman. Chronic is jealous and expresses his desire for anal sex. Bluntgirl agrees to this, however, she penetrates Chronic with a dildo, much to Chronic's distaste. Bluntgirl asks Bluntman, who's reading a comic and smoking a cigarette, if he's ever experienced anything of the like, to which he replies, "Yeah, when Ben Affleck played Daredevil.". During the credits, it is noted that "Jay and Silent Bob will return in Clerks III."

After the credits, Jay and Silent Bob are visited by Stan Lee, who wishes to speak to them about the "Avenger Initiative". Shortly after, they are all picked up by Doc Brown, who requests their help in getting back to the future.

== Cast ==
- Jason Mewes as Jay / Chronic
- Kevin Smith as Silent Bob / Bluntman and himself
- Eliza Dushku as Lipstick Lesbian
- Tara Strong as Cocknocker and Small Fry the Science Guy
- Ralph Garman as Dick Head and Doc Brown
- Neil Gaiman as Albert the Manservant
- Ben Gleib as NewsGroup
- Jon Lovitz as The Mad Scientist
- Jennifer Schwalbach as Blunt-Girl
- Ray William Johnson as Quick-Stop hipster
- Scott Mosier as The General and Quick-Stop hipster guy
- Ming Chen as Shower bully 1
- Bryan Johnson as Shower bully 2 and Travis the Comic-Hating Bully
- Walt Flanagan as Shower bully 3 and Giagra ad narrator
- Kevin Conroy as The Mayor of Red Bank
- Brian Faraldo as The Diddler
- Jensen Karp as Dick Head's doctor
- Steve Stark as NewsGroup's mother and Internet cafe waitress
- Brian O'Halloran as Dante Hicks
- Stan Lee as himself

== Release ==
The official site was launched on March 1, 2013, complete with trailer (introduced by Smith & Mewes).

The film was shown as part of a touring show similar to how Kevin Smith released Red State in 2011. Every screening had a Q&A afterwards and a recording of the SModcast.com podcast Jay & Silent Bob Get Old. The tour started on April 20, 2013 in Atlanta and continued in America until October. Three screenings were scheduled for England in July 2014.

The film was released on digital distribution and VOD in May 2014. The film saw a physical release on DVD and Blu-ray in the UK by Signature Entertainment in 2014. By 2015, Amazon sold the film in the US as a print-on-demand DVD with no extra features, while Kevin Smith's store Jay and Silent Bob's Secret Stash sold a retail version with the extra features.

On September 1, 2014, the film was released on Netflix.
