= Ming Chen =

American actor (born 1974)

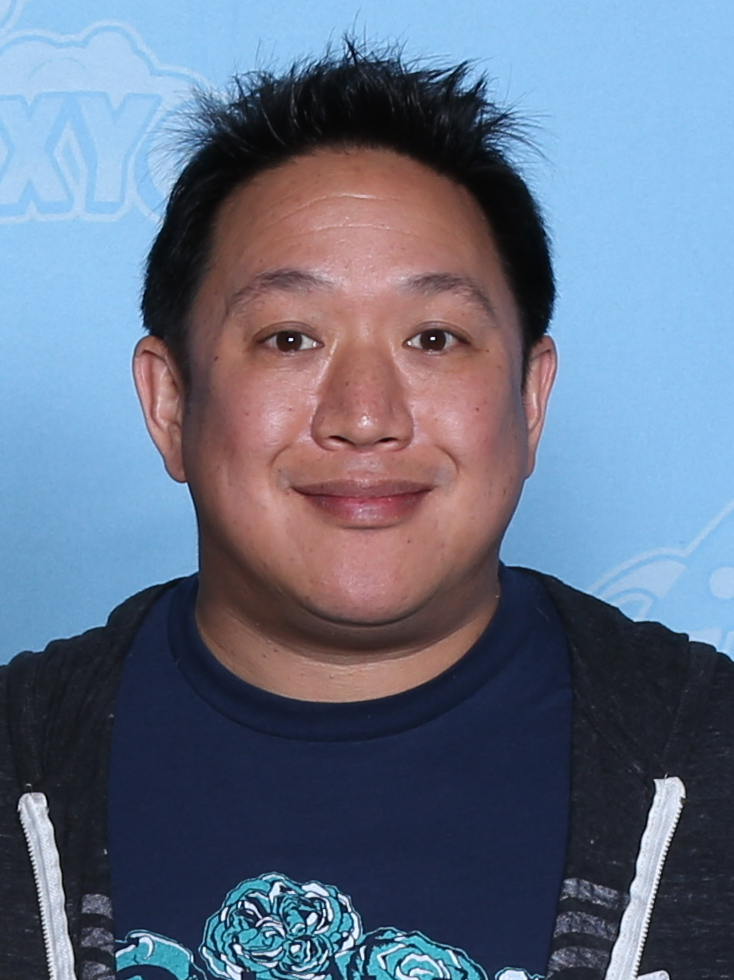
- Chen at GalaxyCon Columbus in 2022
- Born: Cliff Ming-Si Chen; August 1, 1974 (age 52); Euclid, Ohio, U.S.
- Education: University of Michigan
- Occupations: Actor, podcaster, reality television personality, webmaster
- Years active: 1999–present

Cliff Ming-Si Chen (born August 1, 1974), better known as Ming Chen, is an American actor, podcaster, reality television personality, and webmaster associated with Kevin Smith. He co-hosts the I Sell Comics! and Ming & Mike Show podcasts with Mike Zapcic and also starred in the AMC reality series Comic Book Men.

== Early life ==
Ming Chen was born in Ohio to parents born in China. The family frequently moved due his father being an upstart engineer, but spent significant time in Jackson, Michigan, and Ann Arbor, Michigan. Chen attended the University of Michigan (class of 1996), graduated with a degree in communications, and he at one point also worked at a video shop.

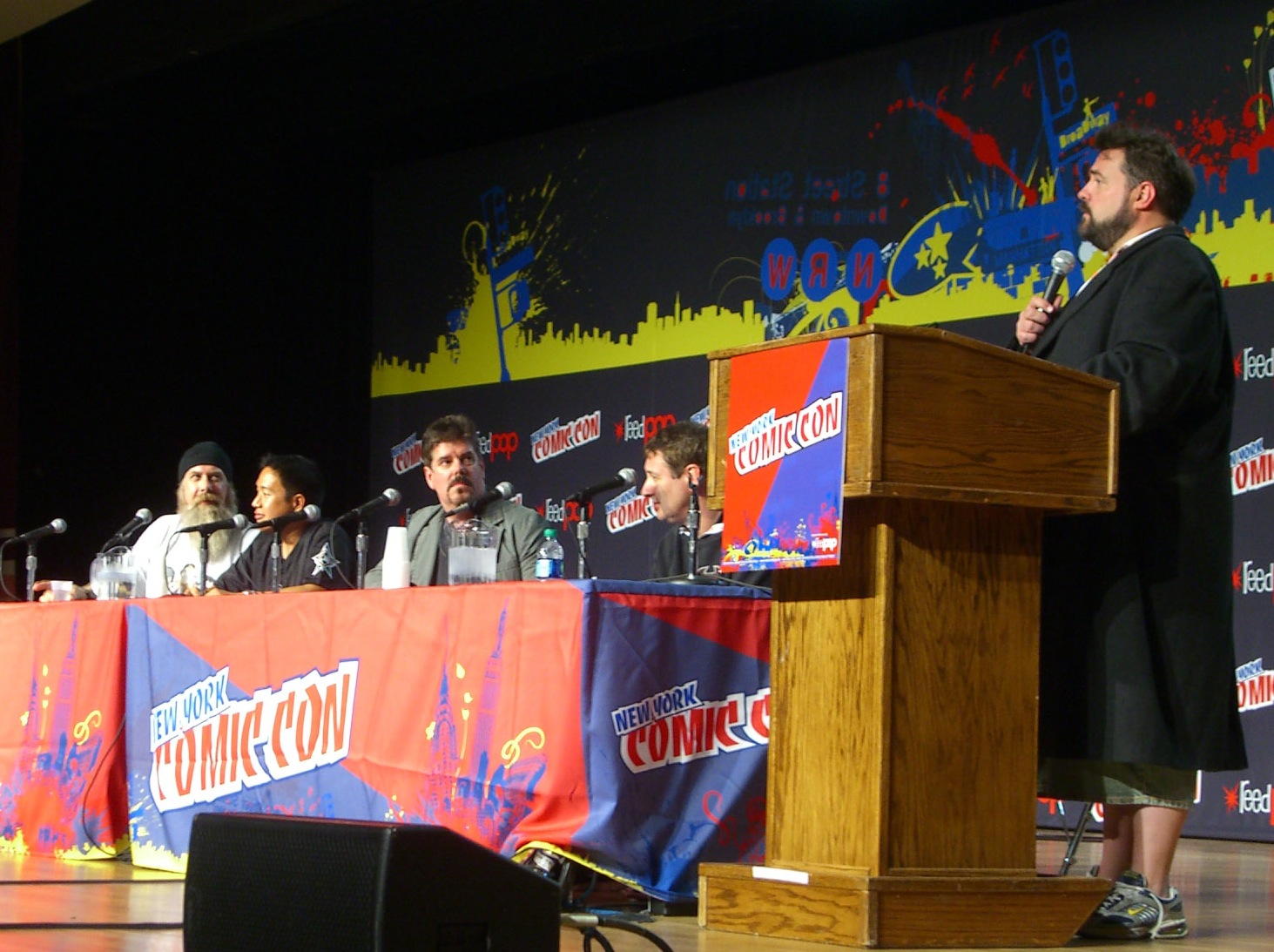
Chen (center left) with the cast of Comic Book Men

== Career ==
Chen became involved with Kevin Smith after making a fansite dedicated to the movie Clerks in 1996. Smith asked Chen to build the View Askew Productions website. Chen served as an extra in the movie Dogma. After working around the Washington, D.C., area, and LivePlanet for two years, he joined Kevin Smith's company in 2002. Chen became the full-time webmaster of View Askew after moving to New Jersey. One of the oddest requests from Kevin Smith was to drive eight hours and deliver a copy of Red State to a critic from the Los Angeles Times in Maine.

Chen has participated in several podcasts for SModcast Internet Radio including Tell 'Em Steve-Dave!, Puck Nuts, and co-hosts I Sell Comics! with Mike Zapcic. In 2012, he began starring with co-workers from Jay and Silent Bob's Secret Stash including Kevin Smith, Walt Flanagan, Mike Zapcic, and Bryan Johnson on Comic Book Men. Ming is often made fun of as part of his role on Comic Book Men, due to his long friendships with Bryan and Walt. Comic Book Men was cancelled after seven seasons in 2018.

Chen partnered with Hunter Pence and others to create Coral Sword: Coffee, Comics & Games in Houston, Texas, which opened in February 2018. Chen partnered with Mike Zapcic to open A Shared Universe PodcaStudio in 2018, with a second location opening in 2020.

== Personal life ==
Chen is married to Debbie and has two children. His favorite baseball team is the Baltimore Orioles. Two of his favorite comic books include Ex Machina and Preacher. Chen's favorite book as a kid was Avengers #214. On Comic Book Men, Chen was able to purchase the USS Flagg, a toy his parents could not afford. He has also participated in several marathons. Chen also does work for two non-profits, Street Poets Inc. and The Kenny Gordon Foundation. Chen joined The YMCA of Greater Monmouth County as a board member in 2021.

== Filmography ==
- Dogma (1999) (uncredited) as Club Patron
- Big Helium Dog (1999)
- Vulgar (2000)
- Jay & Silent Bob's Super Groovy Cartoon Movie! (2013) (voice) as Shower Bully 1
- Jay and Silent Bob Reboot (2019) as himself

=== Television ===
- Comic Book Men (2012–2018) as himself
