= Jay and Silent Bob Reboot =

2019 film directed by Kevin Smith

- Theatrical release poster
- Directed by: Kevin Smith
- Written by: Kevin Smith
- Produced by: Jordan Monsanto; Liz Destro
- Starring: Jason Mewes; Kevin Smith
- Cinematography: Yaron Levy
- Edited by: Kevin Smith
- Music by: James L. Venable
- Production companies: Destro Films; Mewesings; SModcast Pictures; View Askew Productions; Hideout Pictures; Miramax; Intercut Capital
- Distributed by: Saban Films
- Release date: October 15, 2019 (United States)
- Running time: 105 minutes
- Country: United States
- Language: English
- Budget: $10 million
- Box office: $4.7 million

Jay and Silent Bob Reboot is a 2019 American satirical buddy stoner comedy film written, edited, and directed by Kevin Smith. It is the sequel to Jay and Silent Bob Strike Back (2001) and the eighth film in the View Askewniverse. The film stars Jason Mewes and Smith, respectively, as the two eponymous characters. The plot follows Jay and Silent Bob as they journey to Hollywood to stop a reboot of the Bluntman and Chronic movie after inadvertently signing away their names and rights.

Jay and Silent Bob Reboot received a two-night limited theatrical release in the United States on October 15, 2019, by Saban Films. A third film, titled Jay and Silent Bob: Store Wars, is in development. This is James Van Der Beek's final feature during his lifetime.

== Plot ==
Jay and Silent Bob lose a court case to Saban Films, who are making a new Bluntman and Chronic film, Bluntman V Chronic. They also unknowingly gave up naming rights, and can no longer call themselves "Jay and Silent Bob".

Jay and Bob visit Brodie Bruce, who tells them about the Bluntman and Chronic reboot, directed by Kevin Smith. The film is largely completed, but a major scene is to be shot at the annual fan convention "Chronic-Con" in Hollywood. They have three days to get to Los Angeles to stop film completion and win back their identities, and so once again, they depart for California.

In an intermission, the fallen angel Loki then breaks the fourth wall to reveal that he was resurrected by God following Dogma, before revealing that in the twenty years since, he was both the actor Matt Damon and the spy Jason Bourne. Returning to the main plot, Jay and Bob first arrive in Chicago, where Jay sees his ex, Justice, is a local weathergirl. Jay and Bob visit Justice, who tells Jay he left her heartbroken by never visiting her in jail, revealing that she has married a woman named "Reggie" Faulken and given birth to Jay's love child, whom she named Millennium "Milly" Faulken. She introduces Jay to their daughter, after eliciting a promise that Jay will never tell her who he is.

Justice and Reggie leave for vacation, and Milly forces Jay to take her and her best friend Sopapilla, who is deaf, to Hollywood with them. Drugging Jay and Bob with a strong edible, they wake up on a highway in New Orleans, where they meet Milly's two other friends, Jihad and Shan Yu, on a mission to go to Chronic-Con, as Shan Yu is a huge fan of the original Bluntman and Chronic film and it is her dream to attend. Stealing a van, they drive to California. Milly blames her bad behavior on never knowing her dad.

Jay and Bob are abandoned by the group and set off in search of them. They discover that the Ku Klux Klan have kidnapped the girls and are having a rally. Bob steals a Klan hood and passes himself off as the new Grand Dragon to distract them while Jay rescues the girls. They throw a portable toilet at the Klansmen and flee. Jay, Bob, and the girls make it to Chronic-Con and sneak in. Jay and Bob plan to ruin the shoot, while the girls want to be extras to fulfill Shan Yu's dream. Agreeing to part ways, Jay hugs Milly and lets her know he is proud.

After attempting to sneak past a zealous security guard, Jay and Bob are pursued throughout the con. They hide in an empty panel room where they are met by Holden McNeil, who has just finished recording a podcast with Alyssa Jones. Holden donated his sperm to Alyssa and her wife so they could have a child, whom he helps co-parent. Holden tells Jay that fatherhood gave him a new purpose. This inspires Jay to abort the mission and be a father to Milly. Holden gives them VIP badges, which grants him and the girls access to the panel with Kevin Smith.

Noticing that Bob bears a resemblance to Smith, Milly sneaks backstage and knocks out Smith, giving Smith's clothes to Bob as a disguise. Bob and Milly take the stage, calling her friends to join her to film the climactic scene for the new film, but Shan Yu inexplicably knocks Bob unconscious, and threatens to execute the real Kevin Smith. Shan Yu then reveals herself to be a Russian spy, bent on destroying American pop culture conventions. Jay confesses that he no longer cares about regaining his name, preferring to be known as "Dad", thus revealing to Milly that he is her father. Bob regains consciousness outside and puts on a large metal "Iron Bob" suit that was to be used in the filming of the scene. Controlling the suit, Bob incites a riot at the panel; Shan Yu uses a sonic weapon to disable the mob but Sopapilla is unaffected and knocks her out with a hockey stick.

After getting home, Jay shows Milly the Quick Stop and tells her the stories of his and Silent Bob's adventures, including meeting Justice. Dante Hicks arrives to open the Quick Stop and bemoans the fact that the steel shutter locks are once again jammed closed by chewing gum.

In a post-credits scene, Jay tells Milly that for the past twenty-five years, he and Silent Bob have been pranking Dante by jamming gum in the locks.

== Cast ==
- Jason Mewes as Jay
- Kevin Smith as Silent Bob / Himself
- Harley Quinn Smith as Millennium "Milly" Faulken, Jay's estranged daughter, and a member of the girl gang
- Aparna Brielle as Jihad, a Muslim girl sent to the US by her mother; a member of the girl gang
- Shannon Elizabeth as Justice Faulken, Milly's mother and Reggie's wife
- Brian O'Halloran as Dante Hicks / Grant Hicks / Himself
- Jason Lee as Brodie Bruce
- Ben Affleck as Holden McNeil
- Joey Lauren Adams as Alyssa Jones
- Jennifer Schwalbach Smith as Miss McKenzie, a Mooby's manager; Smith reprises her role from Yoga Hosers.
- Treshelle Edmond as Sopapilla, a deaf member of the girl gang
- Alice Wen as Shan Yu, a Chinese girl and Bluntman and Chronic superfan; a member of the girl gang
- Craig Robinson as Judge Jerry N. Executioner
- Joe Manganiello as Bailiff
- Frankie Shaw as Prosecutor
- Justin Long as Brandon St. Randy, Jay and Silent Bob's and Saban Films' lawyer; Long reprises his role from Zack and Miri Make a Porno.
- Donnell Rawlings as SWAT Captain
- David Dastmalchian as SWAT Officer
- Chris Jericho as the KKK Grand Wizard
- Kate Micucci as Mary, a Mooby's employee
- Diedrich Bader as Gordon, a diligent security guard
- Melissa Benoist as Reboot Chronic
- Val Kilmer as Reboot Bluntman
- Tommy Chong as Alfred
- Matt Damon as Loki, a fallen angel who was Jason Bourne
- Fred Armisen as Todd "Merkin" Merkinsky, a vehicle for hire driver
- Molly Shannon as Joline, an airline receptionist
- Ralph Garman as Ted Underhill, an arrogant businessman whose credit card information Jay and Silent Bob steal.
- Rosario Dawson as Reggie Faulken, Justice's wife
- Logan Mewes as Amy, Alyssa's daughter
- Adam Brody as Chronic-Con Hot Topic salesman
- Dan Fogler as Chronic-Con line attendant

A number of Hollywood stars make cameos as themselves, including Jason Biggs and James Van Der Beek, similar to their appearance in Jay and Silent Bob Strike Back, Method Man and Redman in Jay and Silent Bob's hallucination, Chris Hemsworth via a holographic projection at Chronic-Con, Robert Kirkman during the credits, Keith Coogan, and Stan Lee, who makes a posthumous appearance in a mid-credits scene through the use of archive footage of himself and Smith taken from San Diego Comic-Con.

O'Halloran, Marilyn Ghigliotti, Ernie O'Donnell, Scott Schiaffo, and John Willyung appear as themselves for a Clerks 25th Anniversary panel at Chronic-Con. Walt Flanagan, Bryan Johnson, Ming Chen, and Mike Zapcic appear as themselves during a Comic Book Men reunion panel. Actors Chris Wood, Jesse Rath, Ben Gleib, Impractical Jokers’ Brian Quinn and Fatman Beyond co-host Marc Bernardin appear as convention attendees.

In a mid-credits scene, Jake Richardson and Nick Fehlinger reprise their roles from Jay and Silent Bob Strike Back as the two young men who used to buy marijuana from Jay and Silent Bob.

== Production ==
Following Clerks II, news has appeared often of other titles to be released in the View Askewniverse; these would include Clerks III and Mallrats 2. In 2017, Kevin Smith had confirmed that those projects were cancelled for several reasons, but revealed he had written a new film starring Jay and Silent Bob titled Jay and Silent Bob Reboot. The script was already finished when it was announced and it was said that Miramax would produce it. It was announced on January 25, 2019, that Saban Films had acquired U.S. and Canadian distribution rights to the film, with Universal Pictures Home Entertainment acquiring all international distribution rights. It is the first film in the View Askewniverse not to be produced by Scott Mosier (although he does appear as a Bluntman fanboy at the convention and as a SWAT officer) as well as the first film in the View Askewniverse since Mallrats not to be produced by Harvey and Bob Weinstein.

=== Filming ===
Filming was initially set to begin mid-2017, then moved to August 2018, then to November of that same year. After the various delays, filming finally began on February 25, 2019, in New Orleans exactly one year after Smith suffered a massive and near-fatal heart attack.

During the filming of the movie, Smith released a weekly documentary called Road to Reboot, showing what is being filmed that week. Production wrapped on March 27, 2019, after 21 days of shooting, which was the same number of days it took Smith to film his first movie, Clerks, 26 years earlier.

=== Casting ===
Mewes and Smith were attached to star as early as the film's announcement.

Comic book writer Stan Lee was initially cast as himself in the film in July 2017, but due to his death on November 12, 2018, was instead given a tribute within the film at Brodie Bruce's comics shop while additionally appearing in the mid-credits through archival footage. The film was also dedicated to his memory. The film's original third act was to revolve around Lee, with an extended performance from him as a main character; however, given principal photography on the film did not commence until three months after Lee's death, the entire third act of the script was rewritten and was based on an unused draft from Mallrats 2.

Ben Affleck was initially not involved in the film. When Affleck was asked in an interview if he got the call for Reboot, he said that "Your guess is as good as mine." and voiced his preference about potentially reprising the role of Holden from the film Chasing Amy rather than Shannon from the film Mallrats if he were to appear in the new film. After hearing about that interview, Smith reached out to Affleck and wrote in a scene for Affleck's character Holden McNeil.

== Release ==
=== Theatrical ===
The film was released on October 15, 2019, as part of two night Fathom Events showings. The first showing on October 15 gave away a limited edition poster of the film, and the second on October 17 was a double feature with Jay and Silent Bob Strike Back.

The movie was released by Universal Pictures in the United Kingdom.

=== Roadshow ===
Following the Fathom showings, Smith embarked on a North American roadshow tour with a presentation of the film, followed by a Q&A session. The roadshow began on October 19 in Asbury Park, New Jersey and continued until February 26, 2020, in New Orleans, Louisiana. The tour expanded internationally near the beginning of 2020.

=== Home media ===
The film became available on Blu-ray, DVD, and streaming on January 21, 2020. The United States home media releases were distributed by Lionsgate Home Entertainment.

== Reception ==
On review aggregator website Rotten Tomatoes, the film holds an approval rating of 65% based on 40 reviews, with an average of 6.4/10. The website's critical consensus reads: "Fan-focused to a fault, Jay & Silent Bob Reboot tries to mock the same audience nostalgia it's mining -- and pulls it off often enough to satisfy the faithful." On Metacritic, the film has a weighted average score of 46 out of 100, based on 7 critics, indicating "mixed or average" reviews.

JoBlo.com's Paul Shirey gave the film an 8/10 and stated, "As comedy is so exceptionally subjective and this film so clearly tied to a somewhat niche appeal, I can only grade it as a fully biased fan of Smith, even if some of his flicks never worked for me, while others touched my cinematic nerve. As a fully Kevin Smith/Jay and Silent Bob comedy with a hefty amount of laughs and heart, this View Askew flick rates among his better works and cemented my resolve to happily revisit these wacky Jersey boys in another decade or so with pleasure."

Writing for The A.V. Club, Ignatiy Vishnevetsky called this installment "crude and lazy", giving it a D+ for crass humor and summing up the plot as "a succession of crudely drawn-out puns, painfully winking self-references, and underwhelming, listlessly directed cameos".

== Sequel ==
In July 2024, during the celebration of Clerks' 30th anniversary, Smith announced a third Jay and Silent Bob film, titled Jay and Silent Bob: Store Wars, was in the works and would begin shooting that fall. However, Smith later stated in January 2026 that they are still in the casting stages, and that the film does not have a release date yet.
