= Geek'd Con =

Multi-genre convention in Shreveport, Louisiana

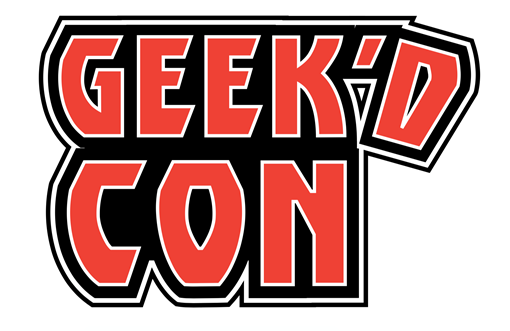
- Status: Active
- Genre: Pop Culture Convention
- Venue: Hilton Hotel Convention Center (Shreveport)
- Location: Shreveport
- Country: United States
- Inaugurated: 2015
- Attendance: 15,000 in 2015
- Organizer: Greg Atoms, Townsquare Media
- Filing status: Corporate
- Website: http://www.geekdcon.com/

Geek'd Con is an annual fan convention held in Shreveport, Louisiana. The event was founded in 2015, and debuted as one of the largest Comic book convention in the state of Louisiana, with a first year attendance that topped 12,000 people over three days.

The event showcases comic books, science fiction/fantasy, pop culture and fandom elements, such as horror, anime, manga, animation, toys, collectible card games, video games and web entertainment. Like most comic book conventions, Geek'd Con features a large floorspace, taking up two full floors at the Hilton Hotel Convention Center (Shreveport) for exhibitors. The event includes a large autographs area, as well as an Artists Alley, where comic book artists can sign autographs and sell or do sketches.

== Economic impact ==
In 2016, Geek'd Con's economic impact for the Shreveport area exceeds $1.4 Million annually. As of the 2019 event, the economic impact grew to $2.2 Million.

== Expansions ==
After the 2015 show in Shreveport, the Geek'd Con brand expanded to new markets. The first expansion was to Tyler, Texas in June 2016, with a second expansion to Rockford, Illinois in October of the same year. While the mild success of this event further expansions have been placed on hold due to low attendance records.

== History, locations and dates ==
Dates	Location	Attendance	Notable guests	Notes
August 21–23, 2015	Hilton Hotel Convention Center (Shreveport)	Est. 12,000	Peter Mayhew, Jeremy London, Jim Cummings, Rob Paulsen, Maurice LaMarche, Jess Harnell, April Stewart, Lindsey McKeon, Samantha Smith, Victor Gischler, Joe Eisma, Jason Starr, Ben Dunn, Jennifer Lynn Warren	Kim Rhodes was originally scheduled to appear, but canceled prior to the show
June 4–5, 2016	Harvey Convention Center	Est. 1,200	Samuel Witwer, Helen Slater, Pruitt Taylor Vince, Lindsey McKeon, Jennifer Lynn Warren, James C. Leary	Titled: Geek'd Con: Tyler
August 19–21, 2016	Hilton Hotel Convention Center (Shreveport)	15,000	Cassandra Peterson, Tara Reid, George Pérez, Kathy Najimy, Brian O'Halloran, Pruitt Taylor Vince, Tate Steinsiek, Karlee Perez, Azure Parsons, Chris Rager, Josh Martin, Jennifer Lynn Warren	John Morrison (wrestler) was originally scheduled to appear, but airport delays caused his cancellation the day of the show
October 1–2, 2016	Mercy Indoor Sports Center	Est. 2,600	Barry Bostwick, Svengoolie, Booker T (wrestler), John Ostrander, Jeremy London, Lew Temple, Pruitt Taylor Vince, Naomi Grossman, Jennifer Lynn Warren, Steve Cardenas, Lindsey McKeon, Will Pfeifer, Phil Moy, Jeff Moy	
August 18–20, 2017	Hilton Hotel Convention Center (Shreveport)	Est. 11,000	Lou Ferrigno, Joey Fatone, Billy West, Kelly Hu, Sam J. Jones, Gil Gerard, Andy Field, Roland Paris	
August 17–19, 2018	Hilton Hotel Convention Center (Shreveport)	Est.12,000	Mick Foley, Chris Sarandon, Erik Estrada, Christopher Judge, John Wesley Shipp, Helen Slater, Matthew Wood (sound editor), Dana Snyder, Mike Grell	
August 16–18, 2019	Hilton Hotel Convention Center (Shreveport)	Est. 18,000	Michael Rooker, LeVar Burton, Barry Bostwick, Trish Stratus, Lori Petty, Kevin Nash, Sonny Strait, Kara Edwards, Cynthia Cranz, Josh Martin, Chris Rager, Mark Ryan (actor)	
August 21–23, 2020	Hilton Hotel Convention Center (Shreveport)	Canceled	Jason Mewes, Ryan Hurst, Lou Ferrigno, Peter Facinelli, Scott Hall, Kate Flannery, Christopher McDonald, Daniel Franzese, Jonathan Bennett, Jim Tavare, Scout Taylor Compton, Ming Chen, and two unannounced Headliners	Event was canceled due to COVID-19 Pandemic
August 13–15, 2021	Hilton Hotel Convention Center (Shreveport)		Alice Cooper, Jason Mewes, Peter Facinelli, Emily Swallow, Christopher McDonald, James Murray, Kim Rhodes, Jonathan Bennett, Jim Tavare, Eddie McClintock, Lexi Rabe, Ming Chen	
