= Cryptozoic Man =

Comic book

- Cover of the first issue of Cryptozoic Man

Publication information
- Publisher: Dynamite Entertainment
- Format: Limited series
- Genre: Horror
- Publication date: October 2013 – May 2014
- No. of issues: 4 (of 4)

Creative team
- Created by: Bryan Johnson; Walt Flanagan
- Written by: Bryan Johnson
- Artist: Walt Flanagan
- Penciller: Walt Flanagan
- Inker: Chris Ivy
- Letterer: Marshall Dillon
- Colorist: Wayne Jansen

Collected editions
- Cryptozoic Man: ISBN 978-1606905265

Cryptozoic Man is a four-issue comic book limited series by Bryan Johnson and Walt Flanagan, published from October 2013 to May 2014. Flanagan described the series as the "creepiest cosmic spookshow ever witnessed!"

== Publication history ==
The concept debuted on the AMC reality series Comic Book Men in which Johnson and Flanagan star. The other co-stars of Comic Book Men are also involved in the development of Cryptozoic Man.

== Plot ==
Alan Ostman, a middle-aged husband/father, sees his life quickly unravel when his daughter goes missing on a camping trip in the Pacific Northwest...Bigfoot country. After Gray aliens abduct him from a roadside bar, he learns that the fate of the world is dependent on trapping the world's most legendary cryptids.

The comic centers on a character who is an amalgamation of a human being and legendary creatures like Bigfoot, the Loch Ness Monster and the Jersey Devil.

== Collected editions ==
The series has been collected into a trade paperback:

- Cryptozoic Man (collected issues #1-4, 112 pages, Dynamite Entertainment, October 2014, ISBN 978-1606905265)
