= SModcast Pictures =

American film and television company

- Company type: Private corporation
- Industry: Motion picture television
- Founded: March 3, 2011
- Founder: Kevin Smith
- Headquarters: Los Angeles, California, United States
- Key people: Kevin Smith
- Products: Film distribution Film production Television production

SModcast Pictures is an American film distribution company and a film and television production company founded by Kevin Smith in 2011. Kevin Smith announced at the 2011 Sundance Film Festival that he would release his latest movie Red State himself under his own distribution company SModcast Pictures by touring the film instead of having a traditional release.

SModcast Pictures produces the unscripted television series Comic Book Men, as well as the Hulu-exclusive series Spoilers.

== Films ==
- Red State (2011)
- Jay & Silent Bob's Super Groovy Cartoon Movie (2013; with View Askew Productions)
- Tusk (2014)
- Yoga Hosers (2016)
- Jay and Silent Bob Reboot (2019; with View Askew Productions, Destro Films, Mewesings, Hideout Pictures, Miramax, Intercut Capital, and Saban Films)
- KillRoy Was Here (2022; with View Askew Productions and Semkhor Productions)
- Clerks III (2022; with View Askew Productions and Lionsgate)
- The 4:30 Movie (2024)

=== Kevin Smith Movie Club ===
After the success of the Red State tour, SModcast Pictures announced a partnership with Phase 4 Films to distribute up to twelve films a year in the US and Canada, with up to four of those films getting the roadshow treatment used for Red State. The first film to be picked up was Bindlestiffs.

- Weekender (2011)
- Losers Take All (2011)
- Bindlestiffs (2012)
- Miss December (2012)
- Alter Egos (2012)
- Money Shot (2012)
- American Milkshake (2013)
- Wonder Women! The Untold Story of American Superheroines (2013)
- The Dirties (2013)

== Television shows ==
- Comic Book Men (2012–2018), on AMC
- Spoilers (2013–2014), on The Comedy Network (Season 2)

=== Internet shows ===
- Spoilers (2012–2014), on Hulu

== See also ==
- View Askew Productions
