= Ernest O'Donnell =

American actor

- Born: November 24, 1968 (age 57); Place of birth unknown
- Occupation: Actor
- Years active: 1994–present

Ernest O'Donnell (born November 24, 1968) is an American actor who is known for his roles in various Kevin Smith films, most notably Clerks.

O'Donnell was the best friend of writer/director/actor Kevin Smith in high school. They had a brief falling out after graduation, but have been close friends since then. Ernest O'Donnell has appeared in a number of Smith’s films. His most notable role is the part of Rick Derris in Clerks, though he was originally intended to play the part of Dante Hicks.

== Filmography ==
- Clerks (1994) as trainer
- Chasing Amy (1997)
- Dogma (1999)
- Jay and Silent Bob Strike Back (2001)
- Jersey Girl (2004)
- Snowball Effect: The Story of Clerks (2004) (as himself)
- Cop Out (2010) (Masked Man #1)
- Shooting Clerks as Sergeant Svenning (2015)
- 100 Acres of Hell as Morgan Childs (2016)
- Jay and Silent Bob Reboot as himself (2019)
