= Karney (comics) =

American horror comic book mini-series

Karney is an American horror comic written by Bryan Johnson and illustrated by Walt Flanagan. The series was published by IDW Publishing in 2005, and was Johnson's first comics project. Johnson and Flanagan are both associated with View Askew.

Originally conceived as a film, Karney is a four-issue limited series which follows a traveling carnival that harbors a dark secret.

== Plot ==
Tobias sees a large shadow approaching. Toby then runs through town, gleefully informing the townsfolk that “they’re here.”

Othello, being clung to by two identical twin midgets, triggers a huge blast of green smoke and the departure of three doves, much to the delight of the simple-minded crowd.

Othello hurries the Cavalcade back into the trailers, so as to leave them wanting to see more.

The children stumble upon the giant tent in the center of all the caravan’s trailers. As one begins to have second thoughts, Othello spots them. But, rather than punish them, he offers them a peek into the coach.

Meanwhile, Toby’s sister, Lacey Ann, and her boyfriend, Manley, are sitting on Lacey Ann’s porch, talking, while Toby eavesdrops.

The subject of marriage comes up, and Lacey Ann expresses her desire to elope immediately, a notion that rattles Manley. The normally conservative Lacey Ann then surprises him by reminding him that the sooner they’re married, the sooner they can consummate the marriage.

Rodale is trying to talk Clarisse into letting him perform cunnilingus on her. An angry Zanzubar then tells Rodale to knock it off, calling Clarisse a cunt in the process. Clarisse takes exception to the comment and flips Zanzubar off, who then directs his anger at her and takes a wild swing, but knocks himself down in the process. Toho then tells him to stop, citing a previous fight between Zanzubar and Clarisse in which she was victorious. Sparta, much to Nathaniel’s chagrin, tells Toho to mind his own business, prompting the big man to open his straight-razor and slice himself across the chest, quickly stitching it back up. Zanzubar then takes to yelling at Rodale, showing off his fighting style. Rodale wants to fight him when Clarisse knocks him off his bench onto the ground. As Nathaniel tries to break up the fight, Sparta screams in his ear. In the middle of Zanzubar touting his own prowess, Rodale bites him on his Achilles tendon, causing him to lash out in reflex and accidentally punch Mrs. X in the face, knocking Baby X out of her hands. Alanzo gives her back her baby, then yells at Zanzubar for getting so riled up, who then spits in his face. Alanzo delightfully licks up part of the spit, taunting Zanzubar, who is about to strike as he is called from afar.

In a barn somewhere, Manley is trying to get tattooed by Artie Andrews in order to impress Lacey Ann, but can’t handle the pain. Manley is mercilessly ridiculed by Artie and his friend. Then, Artie has an idea and retrieves a bottle of hooch from a sack. Artie then smashes the bottle over Manley’s head, vowing to tattoo Manley one way or the other.

That night, the show proves to be a hit with the townsfolk. Othello invites them to join the carnies for a barbecue after the show, with Flotsam and Jetsam working the grill. Rodale then spots Lacey Ann and Manley at the barbecue and expresses his interest in both of them.

They soon get into a fight, and Lacey Ann storms off to the edge of the nearby lake. They make up when Rodale crawls his way between them. The rest of the freaks show up, with Toho claiming that she belongs to Rodale now.

== Characters ==
- Flotsam and Jetsam: A pair of twin midgets. They choose not to speak, and only occasionally communicate by saying “Eeeeeeeee.” Prone to drinking.
- Mrs. X and Baby X: A zombie-like woman along with a zombie-like child. Both have their mouths stitched shut.
- Nathaniel and Sparta: Nathaniel is a man with two heads. The second of which, a smaller, malformed head named Sparta, grows out of his shoulder, and is in a constant state of disagreement with the largely pacifistic Nathaniel.
- Alanzo: An average person; the only thing that makes Alanzo a part of the Cavalcade is his tendency to eat bizarre and disgusting things. Because of this, he is met with constant resentment from the rest of the show.
- Clarisse: The bearded lady. Also has massive amounts of body hair.
- ? and Zanzubar: Dubbed “a living skeleton” because of his being extremely skinny. Though not physically imposing in any way, Zanzubar is always looking for a fight. He is accompanied by one of many unnamed freaks, promoted as “feeble minded subservients.”
- Rodale: Dubbed a “sex-crazed slug man,” Rodale seems to be a black midget born without arms or legs. He is almost always wrapped in a sheet or blanket, giving him the appearance of a slug with a human head. Rodale is bisexual and is constantly thinking about sex.
- Toho: The “Man of Stitches.” A huge, muscular man that performs by carving scars into himself with his trademark straight-razor, and subsequently stitching them back up.
- Gertie: A morbidly obese woman that lives in her own trailer attached to the caravan. Touted as being the size of ten men.
