= David Klein (cinematographer) =

American cinematographer (born 1972)

David Klein, A.S.C. (born December 1972) is an American cinematographer.

== Filmography ==
=== Film ===
Year	Title	Director
1994	Clerks	Kevin Smith
1995	Not This Part of the World (Note: Shared credit with Jeffrey D. Smith)	Phil Atlakson
1995	Mallrats	Kevin Smith
1997	Chasing Amy	Kevin Smith
1999	When	Ricardo Scipio
1999	Eyes to Heaven	Shane Hawks
1999	Carlo's Wake	Mike Valerio
2000	Vulgar	Bryan Johnson
2001	Wish You Were Dead	Valerie McCaffrey
2002	Tattoo: A Love Story	Richard W. Bean
2004	Roomies	Oliver Robins
2005	The Ape	James Franco
2005	Fool's Gold	James Franco
2005	Zyzzyx Road	John Penney
2006	Clerks II	Kevin Smith
2006	Novel Romance	Emily Skopov
2007	Good Time Max	James Franco
2008	Zack and Miri Make a Porno	Kevin Smith
2010	Cop Out	Kevin Smith
2011	Red State	Kevin Smith
2011	Honey 2	Bille Woodruff
2012	The Story of Luke	Alonso Mayo
2026	The Mandalorian and Grogu	Jon Favreau

=== Television ===
Year	Title	Director	Notes
2011	Mr. Sunshine	Thomas Schlamme	Episode "Pilot"
2011–2014	True Blood		19 episodes
2013–2020	Homeland		57 episodes
2017	Six	Lesli Linka Glatter	Episodes "Pilot" and "Her Name Is Esther"
2017	Law & Order True Crime	Lesli Linka Glatter	2 episodes
2018	Strange Angel	Meera Menon; Ernest Dickerson	
2020–2023	The Mandalorian	Robert Rodriguez; Rachel Morrison; Peter Ramsey; Rick Famuyiwa	5 episodes
2021–2022	The Book of Boba Fett	Robert Rodriguez; Bryce Dallas Howard; Dave Filoni	5 episodes
2024–2025	Star Wars: Skeleton Crew	David Lowery; Daniel Kwan; Daniel Scheinert; Jake Schreier; Bryce Dallas Howard	4 episodes
2026	The Five-Star Weekend	Minkie Spiro	4 episodes

TV movies

Year	Title	Director
2007	By Appointment Only	John Terlesky
2007	Flight 29 Down: The Hotel Tango	D. J. MacHale
2019	Deadwood: The Movie	Daniel Minahan
