= Tell 'Em Steve-Dave! =

Comedy podcast

Tell 'Em Steve-Dave
- Genre: Comedy
- Language: English (New York City English)

Cast and voices
- Hosted by: Walt Flanagan; Bryan Johnson; Brian Quinn

Production
- Production: Bryan Johnson; Declan Quinn

Technical specifications
- Audio format: MP3

Publication
- No. of episodes: 681
- Original release: February 2010
- Updates: Weekly

Related
- Website: www.tellemstevedave.com

Tell 'Em Steve-Dave!, or simply TESD, is an American comedy podcast, featured previously on the SModcast Podcast Network. It is hosted by View Askew Productions regulars and close friends of Kevin Smith: Bryan Johnson and Walt Flanagan of AMC's Comic Book Men, and Brian Quinn of Impractical Jokers. The show is edited by Declan Quinn of Creaky Studios. Previously, Tell 'Em Steve-Dave! was recorded at Jay and Silent Bob's Secret Stash in Red Bank, New Jersey, the location seen in the television show Comic Book Men, and the A Shared Universe PodcaStudio, run by Ming Chen and Mike Zapcic. Currently, the podcast records from the TESD Town Studios in Hazlet, NJ.

The show's title comes from a running joke in Smith's View Askewniverse movies in which Flanagan's character, Fanboy, yells "Tell 'em, Steve-Dave!" at Johnson's character, Steve-Dave. According to Johnson, the character of Steve-Dave is based on the owner of a comic book store that Smith, Johnson, and Flanagan once frequented; "Walter could never remember if the guy's name was actually Steve or Dave. So the name Steve-Dave was coined."

== Awards and recognition ==
- In 2010, Tell 'Em Steve Dave! won two Podcast Awards, one for People's Choice and the other as Best Comedy.
- The show was named a Best of 2010 audio podcast by iTunes.
- Winner of the 2012 Stitcher Award for Best Entertainment & Pop Culture.
- Winner of the 2016 2nd Annual Kevin Allison Excellence in Podcasting Award.

== Frequent guests ==
"Sunday" Jeff - Sunday Jeff's first appearance was on TESD 6 "The Courtship of Sunday Jeff" in which they detailed Walt befriending and hiring him to work at the stash. Sunday Jeff works at the stash on Sundays, hence his name. He is also known for telling long drawn out at times nonsensical stories, raunchy rap lyrics, destroying a mini golf course that may not have been a mini golf course and for being the host of "The All New Sunday Jeff Show" on TESD Patreon.

Git ’Em Steve Dave - Gitem (whose real name is John) was introduced to the show in episode 68 "Shower Power", by mention only, and made his first appearance in episode 72 "Making Hay II: The Final Exit". Gitem began working at the stash in 2016 and started to help Walt Flanagan to create games for the podcast. His most famous episodes include one where he "marries" a fan on the air in Episode 300 "Gitem to the Chapel".

Ming Chen - Ming first guested on episodes 8 and 9 of TESD: "Party in the USA I and II", recursively. Ming early on upset Walt and in an act of revenge Walt created a listener contest called the "Not So Superbowl", in which Ming was made to judge dozens of listener submitted pictures of feces covered toilet bowls. This was revealed on episode 25. Ming was also part of Walt's infamous episode 33.5 "Walt Goes Postal", in which Walt details an issue with the local post office and Ming takes the postal worker's side.

Mike Zapcic - 1/4 of the comic book men, Mike also first appeared in episode 8 "Party in the USA I". He made it to the finals of the Blue Juice Comics One True Three Invitational against his podcast partner Ming Chen.

Dave Wyndorf of Monster Magnet - Dave's first appearance is in episode 19 "For those about to Rock", which is also known for first featuring the One True Three game, hosted by game master Walt Flanagan. Dave has appeared throughout the history of the show, detailing stories of his life as a rocker and thoughts on comics, music, and the state of pop culture.

The Franks - During Makin' Hay Bryan, Q, and Walt met two sellers named Frank and denoted them by adding numbers to their names. Frank #2 is most notable for being a survivor of the Dachau concentration camp, which Bryan promptly shares with him that he also has been to Dachau. Frank #2's oldest son lives in Pennsylvania.

Of the franks, Frank 3 is known for being in the background during a lot of episodes and occasionally appearing on microphone like during episode 42 "Joseph, No", where he acts as one of the readers of Bryan Johnson's mother's (Pam) book, voicing the child predator Joseph.

Frank 4 appears in episode 99. He is the offspring of wedded first cousins.

Frank 5 is the most prolific of the franks. He became known to the listeners in episode 131, when he drove down to New Jersey to attend an episode being recorded the day before thanksgiving and has slowly become a regular member of the podcast troupe. His wife, Mrs. Five, also makes her debut during a phone call in this episode. He hosts Frank 5's rewind, The 80's in 80, and the hit Bro-side Attractions on the patreon channel.

Brian Maxwell - Maxwell's first appearance takes place in episode 40 "Bri Said, Ry said" after first being mentioned in episode 7 and next in episodes 17 and 18. Maxwell went on to voice Meundies, a character created for a series of commercials that culminated in a two part audio play written by Maxwell.
