= Jay and Silent Bob's Secret Stash =

Comic book store in Red Bank, New Jersey

Coordinates: 40.350984°N 74.065215°W

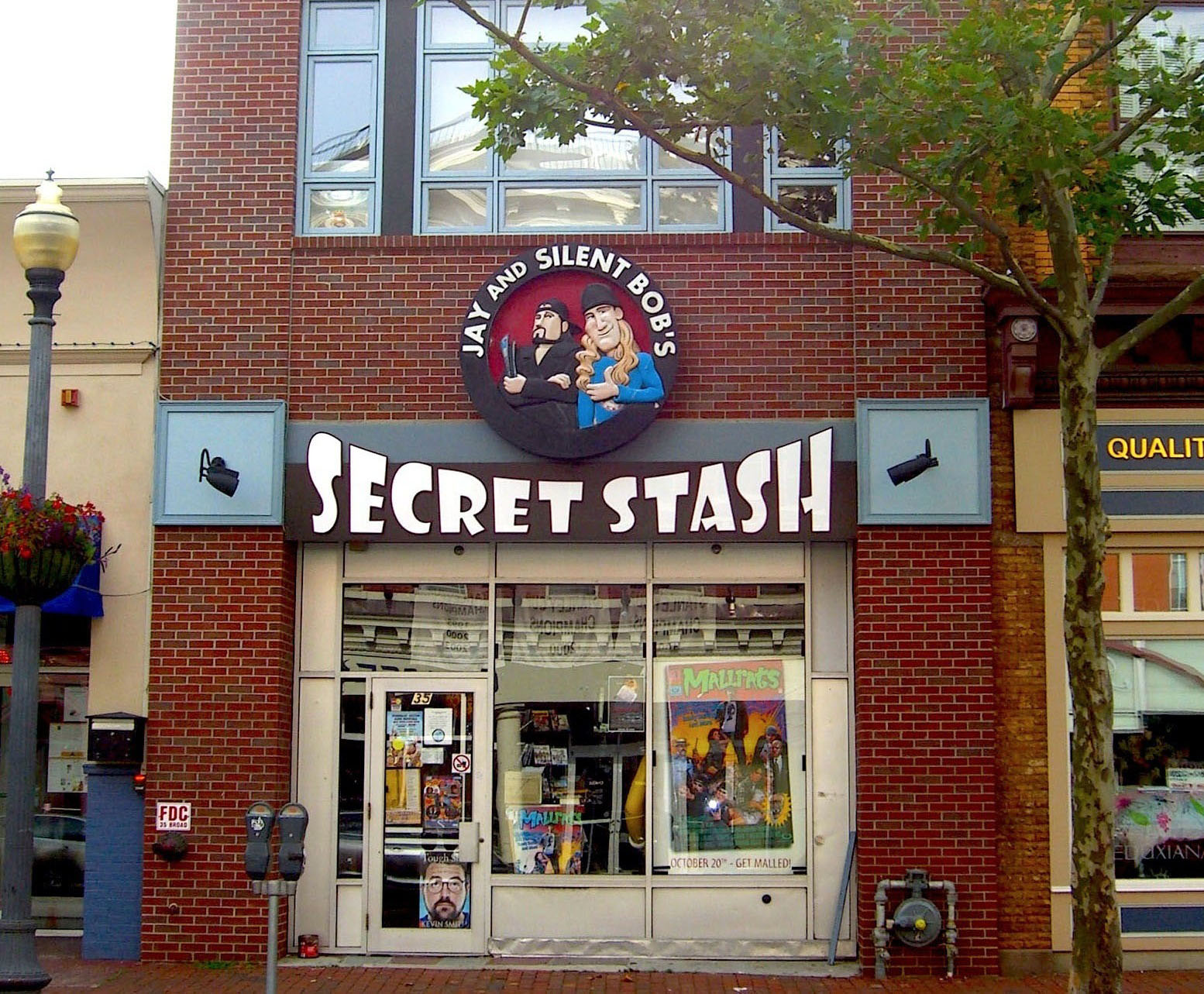
The since-relocated second location of Jay and Silent Bob's Secret Stash in Red Bank, New Jersey

Jay and Silent Bob's Secret Stash (sometimes shortened to simply The Stash) is a comic book store owned by filmmaker Kevin Smith, and named after the fictional duo portrayed by Smith and Jason Mewes in Smith's View Askewniverse films. Merchandise includes comic books, comic-related merchandise, and View Askew film-related items (e.g., apparel, action figures, posters, etc.). The store is located at 65 Broad Street in Red Bank, New Jersey.

The store was the setting for the reality television show Comic Book Men, and where many episodes of the podcasts Tell 'Em Steve-Dave! and I Sell Comics have been recorded, as well as select episodes of SModcast and Highlands: A Peephole History.

== History ==
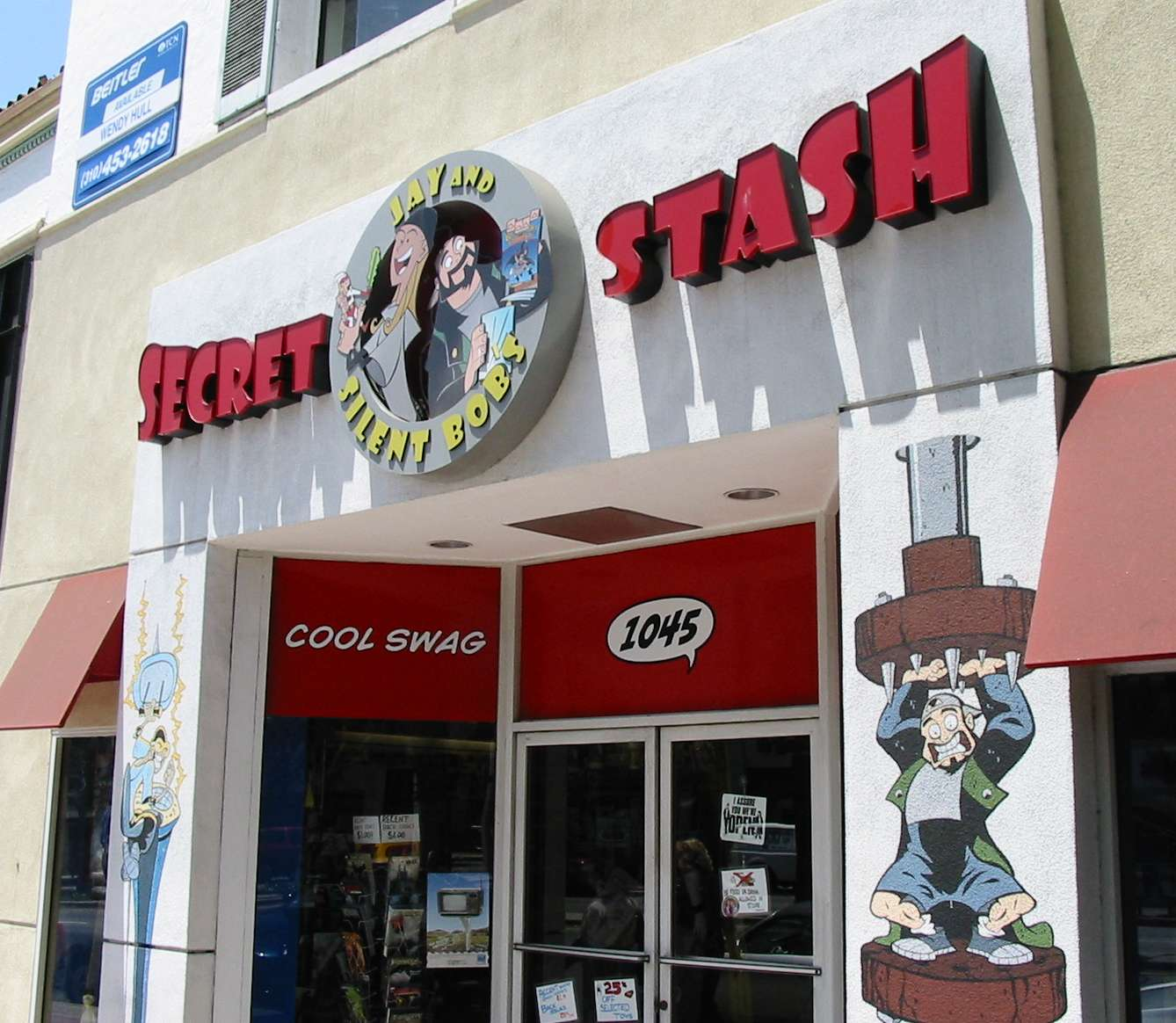
The storefront of the now-closed Secret Stash in Westwood, Los Angeles, California.

The original Jay and Silent Bob's Secret Stash began as a small comic book store in Red Bank, New Jersey called Comicology. It was where Kevin Smith began purchasing his comics in approximately 1995-96, and as seen on the DVD for Chasing Amy, appears in the first deleted scene of that film. When Smith learned the owner was permanently closing the store and moving to Taiwan, he expressed interest in purchasing the store for its back stock and client list. He bought it for $30,000 USD, using the money he earned from Clerks, and took it over in January 1997, putting his friend and colleague Walt Flanagan, whom he characterizes as "our resident comics genius", in charge of running the store. The store was repainted, filled with some film props, and its facade outfitted with a logo designed by Smith's friend Scott Mosier. The store was rechristened Jay and Silent Bob's Secret Stash, after the two characters played by Smith and Jason Mewes in Smith's films.

According to Smith, the store attracted not only the typical local customers, but also those from other states, countries and continents. Feeling that such visitors deserved a less mediocre store to travel to, Smith moved the store two years later to a 4,000 square foot location and had his production designer on Chasing Amy and Dogma help design the store's appearance, and filled it with every prop and artwork possible from Smith's films, such as the Bluntman and Chronic pages from Chasing Amy that had been drawn by Matt Brundage and Mike Allred and the Buddy Christ statue from Dogma. A new logo for the store was designed by comics writer/artist Matt Wagner. Smith had the film crews from Mallrats and Chasing Amy, who spent two weeks renovating the location. The store opened March 6, 1999 with a gala "Stash Bash". at 35 Broad Street, A change jar by the cash register has collected money for Operation Kindness, a local animal shelter championed by Smith's mother.

A second Secret Stash in the Westwood area of Los Angeles was opened in September 2004 and was managed by long-time associate Bryan Johnson, who has appeared in Smith's films as Steve-Dave. It closed on October 10, 2007. The store relocated inside the Laser Blazer DVD retailer in Los Angeles, California. The Stash at Laser Blazer closed on January 11, 2009. Laser Blazer remained open and used the area for Blu-ray Discs. Laser Blazer closed on December 24, 2011 as a result of declining sales.

On November 25, 2020, Smith announced that he was closing the Red Bank store at 35 Broad Street on December 28, and moving the store down the block to a long-vacant corner location at 65 Broad Street. The new location opened on February 22, 2021.

== Memorabilia ==
Various props and memorabilia from Smith's films have decorated the Red Bank store. Among them:

=== From Clerks ===
- Silent Bob's wardrobe – The dark jacket and the other articles worn by Smith's character in his first film were the clothes he himself used to wear, but stopped wearing when the character became famous.

=== From Mallrats ===
- Silent Bob's hard hat and coat – The hard hat was a bicycle helmet that was customized to look like Batman's cowl. Three extra feet of leather was sewn into the coat in order to achieve a cape-like effect.
- Magic Eye poster – In the film, Ethan Suplee's character tries unsuccessfully to see a sailboat in an autostereogram, though the hidden image in the store's version of the poster is of the film's logo.
- Ash artwork – This illustration, which was featured in the film, was the first time Smith worked with artist/writers Joe Quesada and Jimmy Palmiotti, the creators of Ash who drew the piece. Smith comments, "They've got their Ash movie deal with DreamWorks now, but we've got the first Ash appearance in a movie."

=== From Chasing Amy ===
- Bluntman and Chronic pages – Artist Mike Allred illustrated the large pages seen in the film, though due to Allred's schedule, the interior pages were drawn by Matt Brundage, who imitated Allred's style, inked by Allred, and colored by Allred's wife, Laura Allred. Allred's original pencils of some of the pencils have adorned the walls, with some darker lines visible that Ben Affleck traced over when, as Holden McNeil, he pretended to be drawing them himself.
- Santa Claus, Easter Bunny and two lesbians – In the film, Jason Lee's character, Banky Edwards, sketches a road intersection featuring these four characters. The artwork was actually created by producer Scott Mosier.

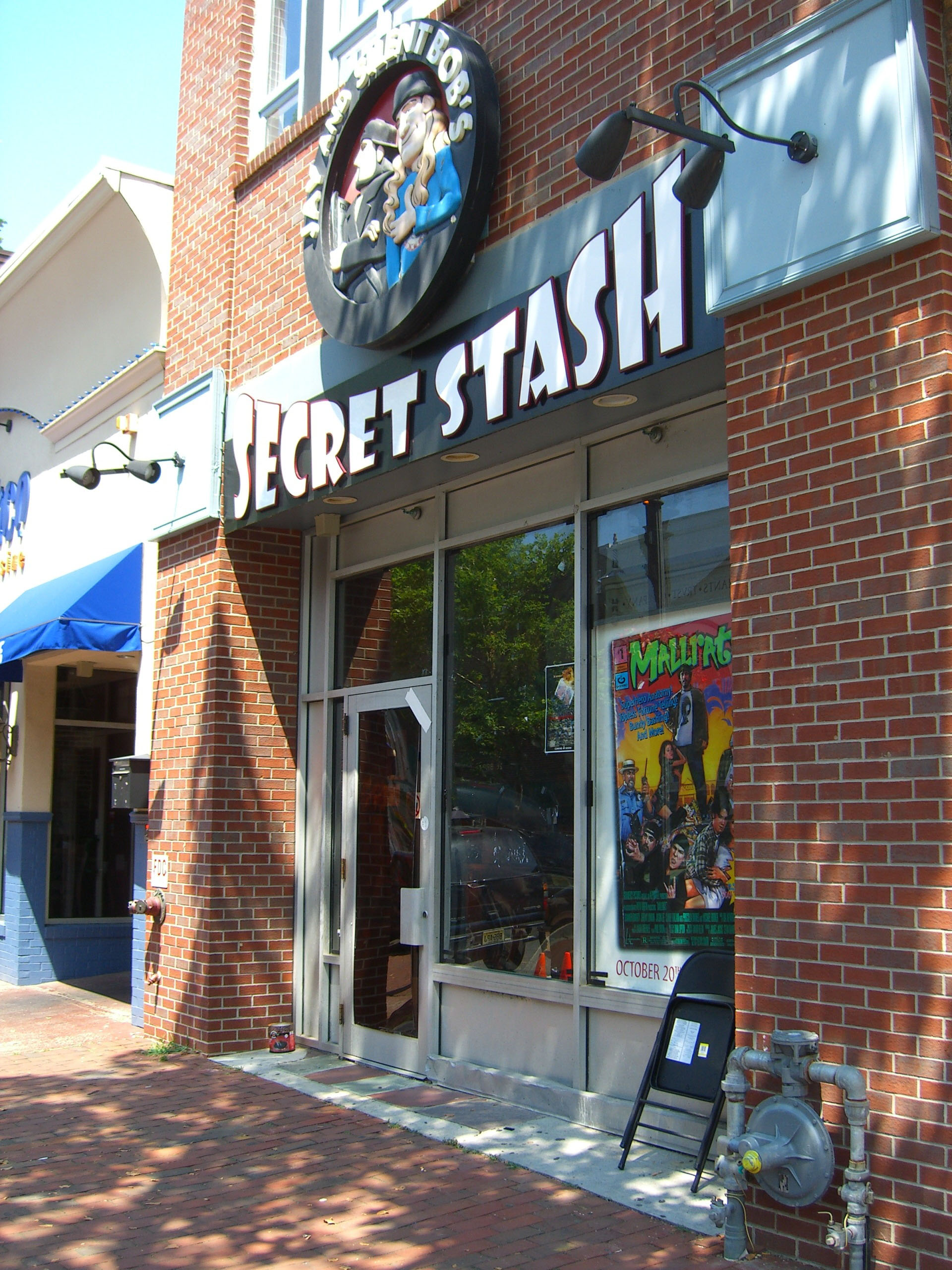
The Stash, as seen on July 9, 2012, the first day of filming of Season 2 of Comic Book Men. Note the tinted plexiglass panels fitted over the door and windows to block out sunlight during filming, and the chair provided for customers whose transactions are filmed for episode segments.

=== From Dogma ===
- Buddy Christ statue – A statue unveiled by Cardinal Glick at a press conference to announce Glick's "Catholicism WOW!" campaign.
- USA Today story on Cardinal Glick – A newspaper story on "Catholicism WOW!" is seen in the film. According to Smith, "USA Today actually does movie prop mock-ups for you. It's better than just getting permission. They do it themselves."
- Mooby statue – An actual prop used the boardroom scene in the film Dogma. It is splattered with fake blood, due to Matt Damon's character, Loki, having shot to death most of the other characters present in that scene.

=== From Good Will Hunting ===
- 1980 Topps Carlton Fisk baseball card – The store's only baseball card was a gift from Miramax, who gave it to actors and producers on the film Good Will Hunting (on which Smith was an executive producer), a reference to the monologue about Fisk in the film.

== Appearances in media ==
The Stash has been a notable location for owner Smith to shoot scenes for some of his View Askew films. It first appeared (while still known as Comicology) in a deleted scene from Chasing Amy as Steve-Dave and Fan Boy's comic book store.

It saw more prominence in Jay and Silent Bob Strike Back as Brodie's Secret Stash, a comic store owned by Mallrats character Brodie Bruce (Jason Lee). Brodie's Secret Stash reappeared in Jay and Silent Bob Reboot; however, the scene took place at a different location of Brodie's store and was not filmed at the real Secret Stash.

It was seen in the Smith-produced Bryan Johnson-helmed film Vulgar.

The store is the setting of the reality television series Comic Book Men, which aired from 2012 to 2018.
