= Comic Book Men =

American reality television series

- Genre: Reality
- Developed by: Kevin Smith
- Starring: Kevin Smith; Walt Flanagan; Bryan Johnson; Mike Zapcic; Ming Chen
- Country of origin: United States
- Original language: English
- No. of seasons: 7
- No. of episodes: 96 (List of episodes)

Production
- Executive producer: Kevin Smith; Elyse Seiden; Charlie Corwin; Brian Nashel
- Camera setup: Multi-camera
- Running time: 60 minutes (season 1); 30 minutes (season 2–7)
- Production company: SModcast Pictures; AMC Studios

Original release
- Network: AMC
- Release: February 12, 2012 – April 8, 2018

Comic Book Men is an American reality television series which aired on the AMC network from 2012 to 2018. It is set at Kevin Smith's comic book shop, Jay and Silent Bob's Secret Stash, in Red Bank, New Jersey.

== Production history ==
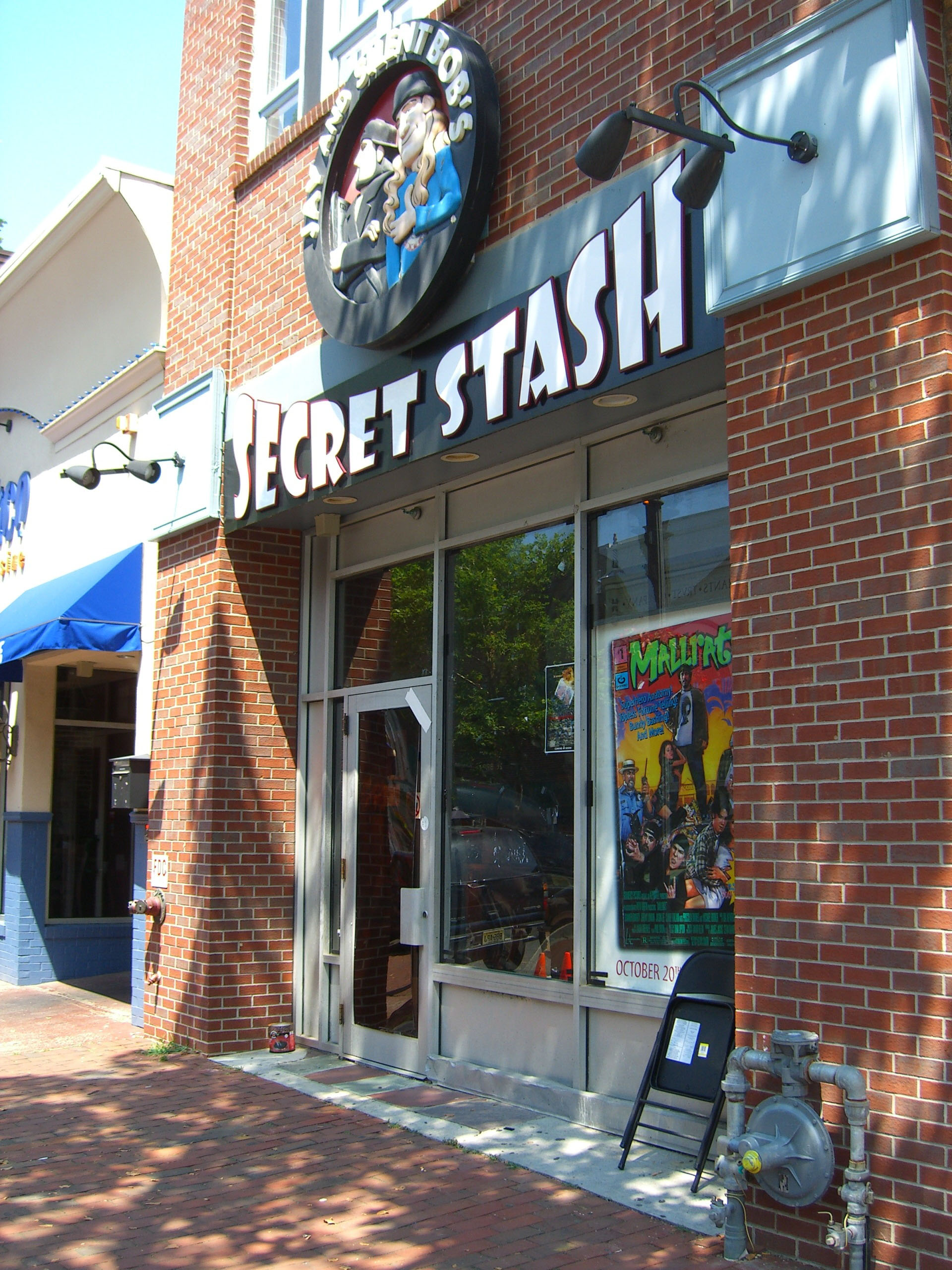
Jay and Silent Bob's Secret Stash on July 9, 2012, Day 1 of filming for Season 2. Tinted Plexiglas panels have been fitted over the door and windows to block out sunlight during filming. The chair is provided for the buyers and sellers waiting to be filmed for segments.

Filmmaker Kevin Smith was drawn to television through his love of podcasting, through which he says he realized his true calling: telling stories with words rather than pictures. His website, SModcast.com, features a number of podcasts, including I Sell Comics!, hosted by Mike Zapcic and Ming Chen, and Tell 'Em Steve-Dave!, co-hosted by Walt Flanagan and Bryan Johnson. The latter was the inspiration for Comic Book Men. Brian Quinn, the third co-host of Tell 'Em Steve-Dave!, was unable to be featured in the series due to the conditions of his contract for the TruTV series Impractical Jokers.

NJ.com reported in July 2011 that AMC was interested in the TV show that was being developed by Smith, which was set at Smith's store, and described as "Pawn Stars for geeks". The series would be part of AMC network's active entry into reality television. AMC decided to pick up the show to follow The Walking Dead. The working title was Secret Stash, before it was finalized as Comic Book Men.

The first season ran for six one-hour episodes, the premiere of which aired on February 12, 2012, following the return of The Walking Dead's second season.

On May 9, AMC announced that Comic Book Men was renewed for a second season of 16 half-hour episodes. Season 2 premiered October 14, 2012, initially following the third season of The Walking Dead with its first 8 episodes; the second 8 episodes spearheaded AMC's new "Real Original Thursdays" lineup along with two new series, Freakshow and Immortalized. On its new night, it initially aired at 9:00 PM EST (with repeats at 10:30PM and 12:00 Midnight EST), but after a month was moved to 10:00PM EST with a repeat episode airing at 10:30 PM (and repeats of both episodes at 1:00AM and 1:30AM EST, respectively)

AMC commissioned a third season in April 2013. Season 3 premiered October 13, 2013, following the third season of Talking Dead.

A fourth season was commissioned in March 2014. It was also announced that guest cast member Robert Bruce would be the focus of a companion series that will follow him as he searches for collectibles at sales, auctions and flea markets across the country. AMC announced in October 2014 they were cancelling all unscripted shows except for Comic Book Men and Talking Dead and, as a result, Bruce's show did not progress past the pilot stage.

Season five was confirmed on June 7, 2015, premiered on October 18, 2015, and ran through 2016.

In May 2016, Smith confirmed that the series was renewed for a sixth season. It began on October 23, 2016.

A seventh season was confirmed in May 2017 by Kevin Smith.

On June 24, 2018, Kevin Smith confirmed the show was cancelled.

== Cast ==
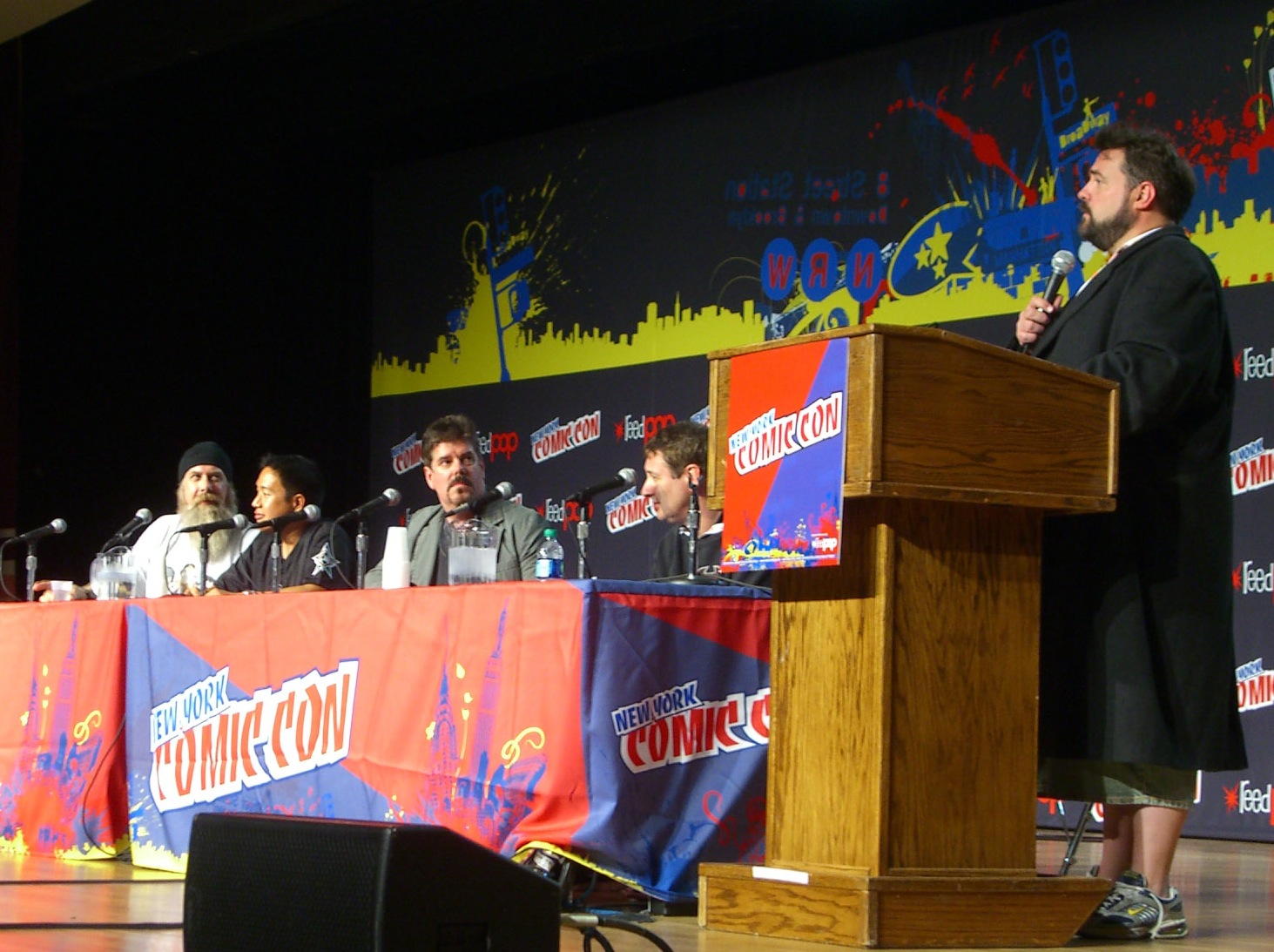
The cast of the series at the 2012 New York Comic Con

- Kevin Smith – The owner of the store, and a filmmaker and author whose films include Clerks, Chasing Amy, Jay and Silent Bob Strike Back, Clerks II, and Red State, and whose books include My Boring-Ass Life. Smith has been a comic book fan ever since he was a child, and has gone on to write such comic book series as Daredevil, Green Arrow, and Batman: Cacophony.
- Walt Flanagan – Smith's friend since high school, and the manager of Jay and Silent Bob's Secret Stash since 1997. Flanagan has also appeared in small roles in Smith's films, and is a comic book artist himself, having illustrated Smith's miniseries Batman: Cacophony and Batman: The Widening Gyre. He co-hosts the podcast Tell 'Em Steve-Dave! with Bryan Johnson and Brian Quinn. Kevin Smith helped him propose to his wife Debbie, referenced in the episode "Stash-teroids."
- Bryan Johnson – A longtime friend of Smith's, who, while not officially an employee at Secret Stash, can often be found behind the front counter. Like Flanagan, he has appeared in a number of Smith's films. In 2000, he wrote, directed, and starred in the movie Vulgar, which was based on the clown cartoon featured in the intro of Smith's film, Clerks, and which premiered at the Toronto International Film Festival. He has also written comic books, including Karney and War of the Undead, both of which were illustrated by Walt Flanagan. He co-hosts the podcast Tell 'Em Steve-Dave! with Walt Flanagan and Brian Quinn.
- Mike Zapcic – Zapcic is described as having an "encyclopedic knowledge of every issue of every comic known to man", which he utilizes at Secret Stash, where he began working in 2000. He co-hosts the podcast I Sell Comics! with Ming Chen, and lives in Long Branch, New Jersey with his wife, Julia and their sons, Mitch and Daniel.
- Ming Chen – Chen first met Smith through the fansite he created in dedication to Smith in 1995, which led to Chen being hired to create the View Askew Productions website. Today he continues to work on all of Smith's online properties, and is the technical expert at the Stash. He co-hosts the podcast I Sell Comics! with Mike Zapcic, and in his free time he does pro bono website work for two non-profit organizations: Street Poets Inc. and the Kenny Gordon Foundation.

== Episodes ==
Season	Episodes	Originally released	
Season	Episodes	First released	Last released
1	6	February 12, 2012	March 18, 2012
2	16	October 14, 2012	April 4, 2013
3	16	October 13, 2013	March 30, 2014
4	16	October 12, 2014	March 22, 2015
5	13	October 18, 2015	April 4, 2016
6	16	October 23, 2016	April 23, 2017
7	13	October 22, 2017	April 8, 2018

== Companion podcast ==
Comic Book Men is a companion television show to Award Winning podcast, titled Tell 'em Steve Dave and the lesser known I Sell Comics, which is hosted on the SModcast network. During the first season of I Sell Comics, some podcast episodes were pre-recorded during the filming of the show, while others were recorded live on the SModco Internet Radio station (S.I.R.) directly following the first airing of an episode, allowing the audience to participate by calling in to the show. For the show's second season, the episodes were all recorded in the Secret Stash and hosted by Ming Chen, occasionally joined by some of the others from the show including Walt, Bryan, Mike, and frequent series contributor (and "pop culturalist") Rob Bruce.

== Reception ==
As of December 2012, Metacritic scores the first season 55 out of 100 based on 7 professional TV critics. Ellen Gray of The Philadelphia Inquirer remarked, "Comic Book Men may not be as complicated as Rubicon, but it's smarter than it looks at first." Mike Hale of The New York Times opined that the series is an authentic portrayal of post-collegiate American life, and concluded, "It's diverting, a little sad, a little boring, full of geeky macho posturing and ultimately pointless, much like a Wednesday afternoon in a comic-book shop." David Wiegand of the San Francisco Chronicle called the show an "amusing geekfest".

== See also ==
- Comic Store Heroes, a similar show set at Midtown Comics in Manhattan.
