= Red State (2011 film) =

2011 film by Kevin Smith

- Theatrical release poster
- Directed by: Kevin Smith
- Written by: Kevin Smith
- Produced by: Jonathan Gordon
- Starring: Michael Angarano; Kerry Bishé; Nicholas Braun; Kyle Gallner; John Goodman; Melissa Leo; Michael Parks; Kevin Pollak; Stephen Root
- Cinematography: David Klein
- Edited by: Kevin Smith
- Production companies: The Harvey Boys; NVSH Productions
- Distributed by: SModcast Pictures; Lionsgate
- Release dates: January 23, 2011 (Sundance); September 1, 2011 (United States)
- Running time: 88 minutes
- Country: United States
- Language: English
- Budget: $4 million
- Box office: $1.8 million

Red State is a 2011 American horror thriller film written, edited, and directed by Kevin Smith. The film stars Michael Angarano, Kerry Bishé, Nicholas Braun, Kyle Gallner, John Goodman, Melissa Leo, Michael Parks, Kevin Pollak, and Stephen Root. The story follows three teenage boys who are lured by an online ad for group sex to a fundamentalist Christian compound led by an extremist pastor, who traps and plans to execute them.

Red State had its premiere at the 2011 Sundance Film Festival on January 23, 2011, and was released in the United States on video on demand on September 1 and in select theaters for a one-night-only engagement on September 23 by Lionsgate. The film received generally positive reviews from critics.

== Plot ==
Teenagers Travis, Jarod, and Billy Ray drive to meet a woman named Sarah in response to an invitation for group sex. Along the way, they accidentally sideswipe the parked vehicle of Sheriff Wynan as Wynan is engaged in sex with another man. Wynan returns to the station and tells his deputy Pete to look for the vehicle involved.

Sarah tricks the boys into drinking drugged beer, and they pass out. Jarod wakes up in a covered cage and realizes he is inside Five Points Trinity Church, a fanatically conservative church, after he identifies church leader (and Sarah's father) Abin Cooper. Cooper begins a long, hate-filled sermon. His followers ritually murder a captive gay man and drop him into a crawl space where Travis and Billy Ray are bound together. Cooper begins preparing Jarod to be murdered in the same way, but stops when he notices Pete driving up to the church.

Travis and Billy Ray manage to cut themselves free, but are overheard by Sarah's husband, Caleb. Travis fails to escape his bonds, so Billy Ray abandons him. Caleb chases Billy Ray into a room stocked with weapons, where the two shoot each other. Pete hears the gunshots and calls Wynan for back-up, but is shot and killed by Cooper's son Mordechai. Cooper blackmails Wynan, telling him to stay away or he will reveal Wynan's bisexuality to his wife. Wynan calls Agent Joseph Keenan of the Bureau of Alcohol, Tobacco, Firearms and Explosives, who begins setting up outside the church.

Travis breaks free, arms himself and plans to shoot the congregation, but witnesses Jarod being held captive in the church. Travis instead flees the church, but is mistaken for a member by Wynan and shot. Keenan tries to reason with the group, but Cooper shoots an ATF agent. A shoot-out erupts and Wynan is killed. The ATF orders Keenan to stage a full military raid on the church to eliminate all witnesses. Keenan passes the order on to ATF Agent Harry, who refuses.

During the shoot-out, Sarah's daughter Cheyenne escapes and is captured by an ATF agent. Sarah kills him as he is about to shoot Cheyenne. Cheyenne returns to the house and frees Jarod, begging him to help her hide the congregation's children. He refuses and she attacks him. Sarah attacks Jarod, and Cheyenne accidentally shoots and kills Sarah. Jarod decides to help Cheyenne hide the children. They plead with Keenan to spare the children but are both killed by Harry. The shoot-out is interrupted by a mysterious trumpet blast. The church congregation members lower their weapons and run outside rejoicing, claiming that the Rapture has occurred and taunting the ATF.

At a government briefing several days later, Keenan reports that he head-butted Cooper and took the rest of the congregation into custody. He explains that the trumpet noises were a prank by a group of local college students irritated with Cooper. Keenan is promoted despite disobeying a direct order from his superiors. They explain that their initial decision to kill the members of the congregation was personal and that they are satisfied with incarcerating the congregation without trials, upsetting Keenan. Cooper is seen pacing around his cell singing and sermonizing until another prisoner tells him to shut up.

=== Original ending ===
During various interactive Q&As for the film, Smith has stated that the original ending continued with the Rapture happening and the Four Horsemen of the Apocalypse descending on the scene. An animated version of the ending was uploaded on the Entertainment Weekly YouTube Channel.

== Cast ==
- Michael Parks as Pastor Abin Cooper
- John Goodman as ATF Special Agent Joe Keenan
- Melissa Leo as Sarah Cooper, Pastor Cooper's daughter, Caleb's wife and Cheyenne's mother
- Kyle Gallner as Jarod
- Kerry Bishé as Cheyenne Cooper, Sarah and Caleb's daughter and Abin Cooper's granddaughter
- Michael Angarano as Travis
- Nicholas Braun as Billy Ray
- Ralph Garman as Caleb Cooper, Sarah's husband, Abin Cooper's son-in-law and Cheyenne's father
- Stephen Root as Sheriff Wynan
- James Parks as Mordechai Cooper, Pastor Cooper's son and Fiona May's father
- Haley Ramm as Maggie Cooper
- Anna Gunn as Travis' Mother
- Kevin Pollak as ATF Special Agent Brooks
- Matt L. Jones as Deputy Pete
- Kevin Alejandro as ATF Tactical Agent Harry
- Betty Aberlin as Abigail Cooper
- Jennifer Schwalbach Smith as Esther Cooper, Mordechai's wife and Fiona May's mother
- Molly Livingston as Fiona May Cooper, Esther and Mordechai's daughter
- Kaylee DeFer as Dana, a classmate of Jarod and his friends
- Damian Young as Agent Carol
- Alexa Nikolas as Jesse
- Kevin Smith as prisoner who tells Pastor Abin Cooper to shut up

== Production ==
Smith announced at the Wizard World Chicago 2006 convention that his next project would be a straight horror film. In April 2007, Smith revealed the title of the movie to be Red State and said that it was inspired by infamous pastor Fred Phelps and the Waco siege, or as Smith claimed, "very much about that subject matter, that point of view and that position taken to the absolute extreme. It is certainly not Phelps himself but it's very much inspired by a Phelps (like) figure." The first draft was finished in August 2007 with Smith wanting to film it before Zack and Miri Make a Porno. Setting it apart from the majority of his other films, Smith made it clear that Red State was a horror film, stating that there would be no toilet humor in the film.

While speaking at a Q&A event in London on October 13, 2009, Smith stated that funding had been secured for Red State but that he wanted to proceed with his planned hockey film Hit Somebody and delay filming Red State for a year. Another reason cited for the delay was that Smith held a superstition about dying after making his tenth movie, and that he did not want to leave an "unpleasant, nasty" film as his last. In February 2010, he talked about his project with CINSSU, saying that he was working through the project's financial challenges; he considered obtaining funding through investments from his fans but this idea was later dropped.

Film producers Bob and Harvey Weinstein, who had been involved in the distribution of all Kevin Smith films with the exception of Mallrats and Cop Out, passed on supporting Red State with necessary funding. The budget was provided from two main private investor groups that raised the $4 million, one based in New York, one in Canada.

On July 24, 2010, it was also reported that actor Michael Parks had signed on to the film in a starring role, and on September 5, 2010, Smith confirmed that Matt L. Jones was also cast. On the September 20 edition of his and Ralph Garman's podcast Hollywood Babble-on, Smith announced that John Goodman had joined the cast. Smith edited the film throughout production and showed a first cut at the film's wrap party.

In July 2010, Smith stated on his Twitter account that "God-willing, Sundance in Jan for RED STATE." On November 8, Smith announced on Twitter that the movie was viewed by Sundance, to determine if it was eligible for entry in the 2011 festival. On December 1, Smith announced on his Plus One podcast that Red State would be screened at the 27th Sundance Film Festival in the non-competition section.

In the "Commercial" episode of Comic Book Men, Smith cited Bryan Johnson's film Vulgar as being an inspiration for Red State.

During the post-production process, Smith announced on social media that he was accepting song submissions for the soundtrack of the film. At least one fan-submitted song was used.

== Marketing and distribution ==
Throughout the months of November and December, teaser posters were released featuring characters from the movie in auctions via his Twitter account with the winning bidder hosting the poster exclusively on their website, while the money raised by the auction went to charity. Smith released a teaser trailer for the film on December 23, 2010.

=== Auction controversy ===
"...soon after the film played to a good but not great reaction in its world premiere, Smith ditched the idea of a public sale and announced to the audience (after auctioning the film to himself for $20) that he would release the film on his own in October."

— Reporter John Horn, an observer at the live-auction

Although Smith had announced plans to auction off the rights to Red State to distributors attending his Sundance Film Festival screening of the film, he revealed that was merely a ploy and Smith planned to self-distribute as a travelling roadshow beginning March 5 at Radio City Music Hall, and would tour the film across North America before releasing Red State directly to DVD and VOD.

Controversy soon erupted after Smith's speech at the film's debut screening at Sundance. Although Smith had decided to self-distribute the film, according to the film's producer Jonathan Gordon the option of self-distributing the movie was not considered at first:

Hiring longtime specialty exec Dinerstein (whose film marketing consultancy also arranges self-distribution deals), bringing aboard Cinetic Media (which arranged service deals for sale titles like last year's Banksy doc "Exit Through the Gift Shop") with co-seller WME, and slapping the word "March" at the end of the teaser trailer has led many to suspect Smith has a self-distribution backup plan should an attractive offer fail to materialize. But is self-distribution or a service deal even an option they're considering? "No," says Gordon. "We want to have someone who loves the movie, understands it, knows how to handle it and get the most out of it."

"... to hear Smith dismiss the idea of "selling [the movie] to some jackass," neither the rant nor the phony auction was amusing. It seemed Smith had poured a liberal dose of gasoline on a pile of indie-film relationships and lit a match, and some observers took it as a sign that Smith might finally be imploding."

— Kim Masters, on the auction controversy

The sudden announcement of self-distribution after initially announcing an auction provoked a backlash from the media and accusations of dishonesty, with some analysts commenting that they watched Smith "implode" and that he had "lost cred" and one prominent buyer saying, "He stole two hours and insulted every one of us ... He was a little like the twisted preacher Michael Parks played in his film. It became life imitating art." Smith joked about the people who had expected to buy the film at his Sundance speech:

Now, we're obviously not selling the movie, so I'm sorry to ... the distributors in the room. ... Number one: I'm not that sorry. It's a fucking film festival. Come see a movie. ... no hard feelings. Hopefully you don't mind. ... Thank you for coming. ... I will say this in my own defense ... a lot of youse work for studios ... you guys make a lot of trailers - you've lied to me many times. ... I've seen many trailers where I'm like "this is awesome", and I put my money down, and I'm like "You fucking lying whores". So ladies and gentleman, as you can see we're up here alienating all our future work, just burning the bridge as we cross it, and ah, that means there's probably not going to be much studio help for me and Jon in the future.

According to some writers, the internet community seemed to galvanize in response to the controversy, "...it seems Kevin Smith finally has the Internet critical community united on the same side: against him." Smith countered allegations of dishonesty by saying, "And I told the truth, in my tweet. I said, 'If I get to Sundance, I intend to pick my distributor in the room, auction-style.' Auction-style—did I not do that? ... I stood up there and said that I'm gonna take my movie—I'm gonna take it out and try not to spend money doing it."

Kim Masters, editor-at-large for The Hollywood Reporter, interviewed associates close to Smith about his alleged career "implosion" at the Sundance debut of his film and the events leading up to it:

Smith was one of the first in the business to have a website and sell merchandise – pieces of film from his movies and action figures – to fans. But one source who has worked with him thinks Smith might be one of the first filmmakers to exploit and then be undone by social media, and that access to social media has eliminated any filter that might have protected Smith from emotional outbursts that, in this person's view, have undermined his career.

Smith responded to Masters, saying that it was "a Jerry Maguire moment. I've got a little fish in a plastic bag and one idealistic secretary on my side, and the Bob Sugars seem to be leaning in doorways, smirking."

=== Indie Film 2.0 ===
Smith described his motivations, strategy, and thought process behind the marketing method at his Sundance appearance and on various podcast shows, Q&As, and tweets. He described the strategy as carefully planned with his business partners, including Jonathan Gordon, who had recently had an interesting experience as a short-lived executive at Universal. Smith did not take a salary for the film, noting that the plan was to pay investors back first.

In his Sundance Q&A, Smith compared the Indie scene from the 1990s to the present film landscape. He described the traditional film marketing system, in which studios buy films and then spend large amounts of money marketing it (often comparable to the film cost). He noted that it took seven years for his film Clerks to become profitable due to this system (see Hollywood accounting). He also compared selling a film to giving a child away for someone else to raise it. Other telling quotes from his Sundance appearance referenced a sort of rebirth of the notion of independence in show business.

"We're starting over ... true independence isn't making a film and selling it to some jackass. True independence is schlepping that shit to the people yourself. And that's what I intend to do..."

"Yes, anybody can make a movie, we know that now ... What we aim to prove is that anybody can release a movie as well, and it's not enough to just make it and sell it anymore, I'm sorry. ... Indie film isn't dead people, it just grew up. It's just indie film 2.0 now, and in indie film 2.0 we don't let them sell our movie, we sell our movie ourselves."

"Root for us if you will, hate us if you must. ... But I can't think of a more interesting business news story that you're ever gonna hear about this fucking year, man. We're definitely gonna go out there and try to find a new distribution model."

Smith planned to spend no money on traditional advertising (billboards, TV, print media), instead using the aforementioned in-person theatre tour with accompanying Q&A show, word-of-mouth, Twitter, social media, podcasts, and other means not traditionally used by the studio system.

In April 2011, Smith revealed that Red State had already made its budget back with the film making $1 million on the first leg of the tour, $1.5 million from a handful of foreign sales and $3 million from a domestic distribution deal for VOD.

== Tour and screenings ==
The Westboro Baptist Church protested the film's release at the Sundance Film Festival because some of the elements of the film were "modeled after the founder and members of the Westboro Baptist Church."

The tour went well and the experience was described in detail in many of the SModco podcasts. On one of the tour stops, two defectors from the Westboro Baptist Church appeared at the public Q&A to ask Smith questions from the audience. He invited them on stage and proceeded to interview them.

The film was released to cinemas in Australia on October 13, 2011.

== Animated alternate ending ==
In 2015, Dan Costales, who worked with sound designer Bobb Barito and animator Dennis Fries, made an animated short based on the film's original ending, which was uploaded on Entertainment Weekly's Youtube channel in March 2015.

== Reception ==
=== Box office ===
At the box office, Red State earned $1,104,682 in the United States. On its opening weekend, it grossed $204,230 in one theater, and it played at five theaters in its widest release. It grossed another $769,778 internationally for a total worldwide gross of $1,874,460.

=== Critical response ===
The film received mixed reviews from critics and has a score of 61% on Rotten Tomatoes based on 92 reviews with an average rating of 6.10/10. The website's critical consensus states, "Red State is an audacious and brash affair that ultimately fails to provide competent scares or thrills." The film also has a score of 50 out of 100 on Metacritic based on reviews from nine critics indicating "mixed or average reviews".

Edward Douglas of Shock Till You Drop panned the movie saying that, "it feels like one of Smith's Twitter rants fleshed out into film with equal portions of bile sprayed at both church and state." Katey Rich of Cinema Blend reporting in her review, "Messy, overwritten, visually stylish, but kind of a bore. More like Kevin Smith than it looks because nobody ever stops talking. And it's not a horror movie by any usual definition. More like teen horror movie morphs into Waco disaster. Melissa Leo overacts, Michael Parks is impressive as Fred Phelps figure but the character's meaning and purpose in the narrative (or lack thereof) is fuzzy." Jordan Hoffman in his review for UGO also panned the film, saying, "Kevin Smith, a wonderful public speaker and genuinely fun guy, has yet to master the basics of movie making." According to Drew Mcweeny of "Motion Captured", "Kevin Smith's Red State fails onscreen and off at its world premiere ... A shoddy film and a bait-and-switch event fail to satisfy on any level." Raffi Asdourian of The Film Stage wrote that, "While there are glimpses of Smith's wry humor scattered throughout, Red State can't help but feel like a B action movie that started off with ambitious ideas but collapses under its own preachy weight ... it's clear that the smart alec writer still has some things to learn about making a great film." Matt Goldberg of Collider.com wrote that, "Red State is a radical departure for Smith and yet he lacks the confidence to properly execute the action-horror-thriller he's devised."

James Rocchi writing for indieWire wrote that, "...Smith has gotten as far as he has with his comedies because it is a writer's genre more so than it is a director's. Horror is the genre of a director—pacing, feel, shots, editing—and Smith's skills are not up to the task ..."

Amongst the positive reactions to the film, Todd McCarthy of The Hollywood Reporter called the movie, "A potent cinematic hand grenade tossed to bigots everywhere." Jeff Sneider of TheWrap.com said, "The truth is that I didn't really know what to expect from Red State, but regardless, I still had high expectations and am pleased to report that the film lived up to them. ... it brings something new to the genre, and that something is faith." Germain Lussier of /Film also praised the film, saying, "This is a maturing, confident Smith who proves, after Cop Out, he still has a unique voice. With Red State, that voice isn't saying anything incredibly groundbreaking, and at times it gets a tad preachy, but the director has expanded out of his comfort zone and given audiences a genuine piece of art." Director Richard Kelly also offered his take on the film and Smith while appearing on Smith's SMovieMakers podcast. He said "I have never seen a filmmaker reinvent himself the way you just have. I won't say anything else because I don't want to spoil anything. It's really really exciting ..." Smith blogged on his official film website that filmmaker Quentin Tarantino saw the film and gave him positive feedback about it; Tarantino also named "Red State" as his eighth-favorite film of 2011. Ben Affleck also loved the film and ended up casting Goodman, Parks, and Bishé in his film Argo.

=== Accolades ===
In October 2011, Red State won the Best Motion Picture award at the 2011 Sitges Film Festival, while Michael Parks was named Best Actor. Parks' character, Abin Cooper, received a nomination for Villain Of The Year from the Virgin Media Movie Awards.
