= Bindlestiffs =

- Directed by: Andrew Edison
- Written by: Luke Loftin; Andrew Edison
- Produced by: Andrew Edison; Luke Loftin; Mike Akel; Matt Paterson; Griffin Davis
- Starring: Andrew Edison; Luke Loftin; John Karna; Will Fordyce; Adelaide Lummis
- Cinematography: Katie McDowell; Sharad Patel
- Edited by: Andrew Edison; Luke Loftin; Griffin Davis
- Music by: Dylan Hanwright
- Production company: Green Stoplight Productions
- Distributed by: SModcast Pictures
- Release date: January 2012 (Slamdance)
- Running time: 79 minutes
- Country: United States
- Languages: English; Mandarin
- Budget: $20,000

Bindlestiffs is a 2012 comedy film produced by Andrew Edison and Luke Loftin, the writers, editors, and main two stars, which also stars John Karna. The film was completed in 2011 but wasn't picked up until 2012 after its premiere at the Slamdance Film Festival, where it won the Audience Award for Best Narrative Feature. It was picked up for distribution in 2012 by Kevin Smith under his SModcast Pictures Presents label, in association with Phase 4 Films, the first under this label. It has received a somewhat cult status from the internet, becoming available on VOD, iTunes, and DVD from Redbox.

== Plot ==
On a normal day at a private high school, three teenagers, Andrew Edwards, John Woo, and Luke Locktin find themselves suspended from school after graffitiing a bathroom stall, in response to The Catcher in the Rye being banned at the school, a book which Andrew favors. After being suspended for the rest of the week, Andrew calls up Luke and John and tells them of his plan to hit up the city, living a life similar to that of Holden Caulfield from The Catcher in the Rye. Throughout the course of the week many events occur, such as John ending up drunkingly having sex with a homeless woman after finding out that his teacher, whom he was infatuated with, was a lesbian. Andrew hires a prostitute, Caramel, (played by Adelaide Lummis) who has pretend sex with Luke as he gets nervous, but they later have consensual sex later.

After deciding to get rid of the homeless woman (who was living with the three in their motel room), they take her to the woods behind their school, where the school security guard, Charlie, who had been tailing them all week, approaches them and shoots the homeless woman to death while startled. John then chases after Charlie, proceeds to beat him up, then tases him into submission (and possibly death). The three boys have a funeral three weeks later, where Luke reveals his sexual luck, and Andrew reveals he had to perform fellatio for crack he couldn't pay for. After singing a nearly accurate version of "Amazing Grace", Andrew and Luke leave John by himself, before he wanders off and the credits roll.

== Production ==
Filming started around 2010 when the three were in high school. As they shot, they edited the movie, and re-wrote the script, then filming more scenes accordingly. The 7 terabytes of footage, equalling 400 hours of HD video, was then edited down to a 6-hour version, which was then cut to a 79-minute version. The school scenes were shot first, with drama teachers playing the adult actors, and their classmates playing student extras. They then shot for 2 weeks in a hotel room in Houston, rarely leaving, causing delusion. The rest of the film was shot in the stage where Loftin and Edison re-wrote and were editing the movie. The film cost around $20,000 overall over the span of two years.

== Allusions to The Catcher in the Rye ==
Similar to the book, the boys rent out a hotel room, and Andrew always smokes and wears a red hunter hat. Andrew and his date also go ice skating at one point, where he asks her if she wants to elope, also complimenting her skirt for showing off her "cute ass".

== Distribution ==
In a press release on Kevin Smith's website, SilentBobSpeaks.com, he announced SModcast Pictures Presents' new deal with Phase 4 Films to distribute the film and take it on a Q&A tour, while simultaneously releasing it on VOD, and months later DVD through Redbox rental, and then to own through Amazon and other services.

== Film Festivals ==
Bindlestiffs premiered at the Slamdance Film Festival where it won the Audience Award for Best Narrative Feature. Soon after, it also screened at the Dallas International Film Festival.
