= Bluntman and Chronic =

Fictional characters in Kevin Smith's View Askew universe

- First appearance: Chasing Amy (1997)
- Last appearance: Jay and Silent Bob Reboot (2019)
- Created by: Kevin Smith; Mike Allred
- Portrayed by: Kevin Smith and Jason Mewes (Jay and Silent Bob Strike Back); Jason Biggs and James Van Der Beek (Bluntman and Chronic film-within-a-film); Val Kilmer and Melissa Benoist (Bluntman and Chronic reboot)

In-universe information
- Alias: Jay and Silent Bob
- Gender: Male

Bluntman and Chronic are characters appearing in a fictional eponymous comic book series seen in the movies Chasing Amy, Jay and Silent Bob Strike Back, and Jay and Silent Bob Reboot. Actual Bluntman and Chronic comic books based on the fictional movie comic book series were published after the release of Jay and Silent Bob Strike Back. Both the movies and the comic books were created by writer and actor Kevin Smith. Comics creator Mike Allred designed the costumes for the characters.

== Movies ==
In the film Chasing Amy, Banky Edwards (played by Jason Lee) and Holden McNeil (played by Ben Affleck) create a comic book series based on their infamous stoner friends, Jay and Silent Bob. The first three issues of the series sell out quickly. At one point, MTV offers Banky and Holden McNeil the option to make an animated series. Banky is willing to do it, but Holden declines for "artistic reasons". Soon after this, Holden passes the reins of power over the comic to Banky, and their partnership is disbanded.

In the film Jay and Silent Bob Strike Back, Banky Edwards has sold the rights to Bluntman and Chronic to Miramax, who begin production of a film adaptation of the comic due to the recent success of X-Men. Miramax's production is directed by Chaka Luther King (played by Chris Rock) and stars Jason Biggs as Bluntman (referred to as the pie fucker throughout the film), James Van Der Beek as Chronic, and Mark Hamill as the villain Cock-Knocker. However, filming is interrupted by the comic's inspirations, Jay and Silent Bob, who arrive hoping to stop the film, as they worry that it will damage their reputation (after having been upset by comments made by Internet trolls on a movie gossip website about the film and the characters). Mistaken as Biggs' and Van Der Beek's stand-ins at one point, Jay and Silent Bob are filmed in some of the scenes. Months later, the movie is released. One character in the film, Hooper X, referred to the movie as "a ninety-minute long gay joke," and felt it was "just like watching Batman & Robin all over again." Jay and Silent Bob then use their royalties to track down and beat up everyone who bashed them on the internet.

In an extended scene in Clerks II, Dante Hicks and Randal Graves were wondering where Jay and Silent Bob got the money to loan them to reopen the Quick Stop, and Jay asks "Doesn't anybody remember they made a movie using our likeness?"—referencing the Bluntman and Chronic movie made in Jay and Silent Bob Strike Back.

Bluntman and Chronic also appear in the 2013 animated comedy Jay & Silent Bob's Super Groovy Cartoon Movie!.

== Comics ==
=== Trade paperback ===
A comic book based on the fictional movie was published in trade paperback form by Oni Press in 2001. The book is portrayed as a collection of the three issues written by Banky Edwards and Holden McNeil in Chasing Amy. It was written by Kevin Smith with art by Michael Avon Oeming and Neil Vokes.

In the first issue, after encountering several comic book references, Jay and Silent Bob win the lottery and decide to become superheroes. After Bob handles most of the gadget work, the two don the names Bluntman and Chronic.

In the second issue, some of the nemeses of Bluntman and Chronic, such as Cock-Knocker and Dickhead, reveal their origins to fellow supervillain inmates and a psychiatrist. The psychiatrist turns out to be the Lipstick Lesbian, a newer supervillain, who helps the criminals escape. The five villains, consisting of the aforementioned three along with the Diddler and Newsgroup, form The League of Shitters.

In the third and final issue, Chronic nearly throws out his costume, feeling that he's become "the sidekick". He changes his mind, however, when he realizes Bluntman "has all the weed". Meanwhile, the League of Shitters discover that the Doobage Duo's Bluntcave lies beneath the RST Video/Quick Stop. The five arrive at the stores, only to have Cock-Knocker go into the Quick Stop and buy some snacks. The four others, however, are crushed to death after RST's front wall falls over, allowing Bluntman and Chronic to ride the Bluntmobile into the Bluntcave. Cock-Knocker then exits the Quick Stop, only to step in Dickhead's spleen. Cock-Knocker breaks into the Bluntcave, where he slices Chronic in half with a Bluntsaber. Bluntman slays Cock-Knocker and weeps over his dead friend. The cover of issue three features Bluntman holding Chronic's corpse the same way Batman held Jason Todd's in A Death in the Family.

=== Other comics ===
Two other Bluntman and Chronic comics were published, both with art by comic book artist and Madman creator Mike Allred. The first was seen in the opening titles of Chasing Amy and was published in the Clerks/Chasing Amy screenplay book. The second was published in Oni Double Feature #12. Both have a design style that is very different from that which is seen in the trade paperback. Their style echoes the comics of the 1940s and is visually more similar to the comics seen in Chasing Amy.
