= Karney =

Karney is an Irish surname, a variant of Carney. Notable people with the surname include:

- Andrew Karney, British electrical engineer, businessman and company director
- Arthur Karney (1864–1963), British bishop
- Benjamin Karney (born 1986), American professor and behavioral scientist
- Jack Karney (1895–1986), Australian rules football player
- Mike Karney (born 1981), American former football player
- Pat Karney, Suburb of Manchester, England
- Robyn Karney (1940–2017), South African film writer and critic
- Shari Karney (born 1952), American attorney, incest-survivor activist, and bar exam test preparation company owner

== See also ==
- Karney (comics), an American horror comic book mini-series
