= Walt Flanagan =

American actor

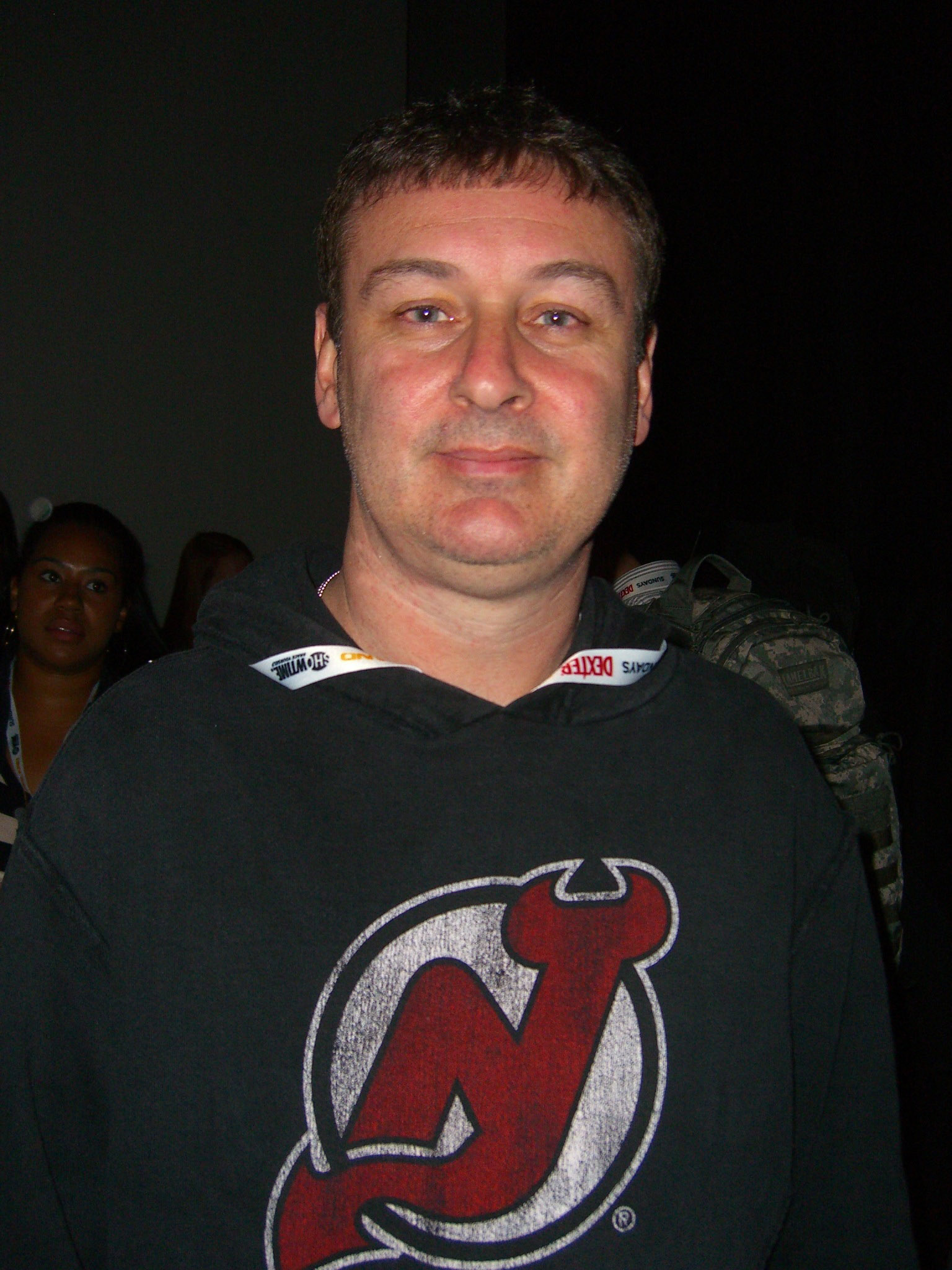
- Flanagan at the 2012 New York Comic Con
- Born: Walter Flanagan; Perth Amboy, New Jersey, U.S.
- Occupations: Actor; comic book store manager; comic book artist; podcaster
- Notable work: Tell 'Em Steve-Dave! Comic Book Men
- Spouse: Debra Flanagan
- Website: Official website

Walter Flanagan is a former comic book store manager, reality television personality, podcaster, and comic book artist. Flanagan is a long-time friend of Kevin Smith, and (according to Smith's book Silent Bob Speaks) it was Flanagan who turned Smith on to comic books. He formerly managed Jay and Silent Bob's Secret Stash in Red Bank, New Jersey.

Flanagan was born in Perth Amboy, New Jersey, grew up in nearby Highlands and attended Henry Hudson Regional High School with Smith.

Flanagan is the co-host of the Tell 'Em Steve-Dave! podcast with longtime friends Bryan Johnson and Brian Quinn. Flanagan was also the lead star in AMC's Comic Book Men, which premiered in February 2012 and was cancelled in 2018.

== Career ==
=== Film ===
According to the Mallrats commentary, Smith cites Flanagan as being the influence for the Brodie character, down to the Dixie Cup full of soda that the character carries with him everywhere as well as his October birth date. Flanagan also originated the character of Olaf, seen in Clerks as Silent Bob's cousin from Russia.

In Smith's 1994 debut movie, Clerks, Flanagan was credited with four different roles (which made Kevin Smith, on the Clerks commentary, refer to Flanagan as "The Lon Chaney, Sr. of the 1990s"). Among these were the egg-obsessed guidance counselor, the cigarette protester who buys a pack of cigarettes immediately after the anti-cigarette protest, the customer offended by the lewd "jizz mopper" discussion, and the customer to whom Randal said the resident cat's name was "Annoying Customer." In the extended cut, he also appears as an RST Video customer. He also designed the clown animation that made up the View Askew logo, and appeared in the Soul Asylum video for "Can't Even Tell", directed by Smith.

In Smith's 1995 Mallrats, Flanagan played the recurring role of Walt "Fanboy" Grover, who is accompanied by his friend Steve-Dave (Bryan Johnson), with whom Walt offers constant assent with his trademark phrase, "Tell 'em, Steve-Dave!" He also appears in an uncredited role as one of Mr. Svenning's (Michael Rooker) assistants who places a podium in the wrong place on a stage, is seen at a table under which Jay and Bob hide from the mall security guard LaFours, and greets Brodie at the swap meet. Flanagan was also given a credit for being a set production assistant on the film. Flanagan is also referenced when Jay states that LaFours is "faster than Walt Flanagan's dog...".

Flanagan and Johnson reappear as Walt Grover the Fanboy and Steve-Dave in a deleted scene in Smith's 1997 romantic drama Chasing Amy. His dog is yet again mentioned in one of the Bluntman and Chronic pages during the opening. In another deleted scene, Banky (Jason Lee), and Holden (Ben Affleck) toss a trash can through the window of Steve-Dave's comic store, in retaliation for the harsh criticism Steve-Dave and Walt gave Bluntman and Chronic.

Walt reappears as Walt Grover among the anti-abortion protestors outside the abortion clinic in the beginning of the film Dogma, among the people leaving the theater at the end of Jay and Silent Bob Strike Back, and in three episodes of Clerks: The Animated Series, though none of them aired during the series' broadcast run.

Flanagan later appeared as a caddy in Bryan Johnson's 2000 film Vulgar, and as a customer in Clerks II.

=== Comic books ===
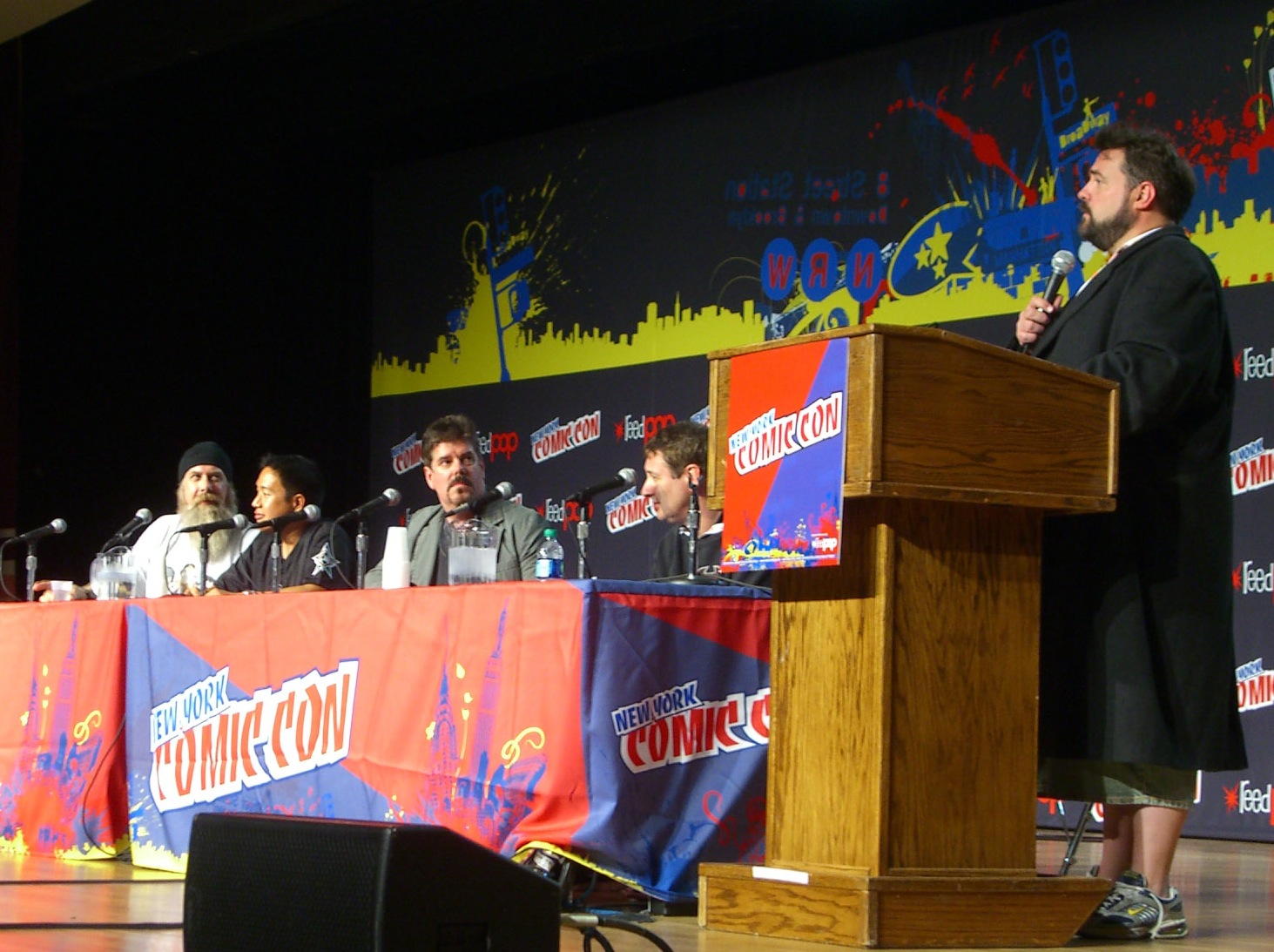
Flanagan, second from right, with the cast of Comic Book Men

Flanagan was also referenced by name in Green Arrow #3 (June 2001), which Kevin Smith wrote. Flanagan also appeared in the movie Bookies(2003) Flanagan himself has provided the art for two comic books published written by Smith and Bryan Johnson. In 2005 he and Johnson published through IDW Publishing Karney, a four-issue horror miniseries which explores the sideshow freaks in a traveling circus in the 1800s. The series was adapted from a screenplay that Johnson had originally written to be produced as a film.

In 2007 the two collaborated on War of the Undead, a miniseries set in 1945 in which the Third Reich hatches an ill-fated plan to employ Count Dracula, the Wolfman and Frankenstein's monster as weapons in a last-ditch effort to defeat the Allies.

Flanagan then provided the art for Smith's limited series Batman: Cacophony, which ran from November 2008 to January 2009. The series featured the villains Onomatopoeia (a character created by Smith during his run at Green Arrow), The Joker, Maxie Zeus, and Victor Zsasz. The trade paperback of Batman: Cacophony became a New York Times Bestseller in their Hardcover Graphic Books section.

In 2010 Smith subsequently wrote a six-issue Batman mini-series called The Widening Gyre for DC Comics. The series was initially planned as 12 issues, with a long break planned between issues #6 and 7. After issue #6 was published, Smith and Flanagan's work on their reality show, Comic Book Men, extended this planned break further than expected. It was decided in the interim to release the remaining issues as a separate series to be called Batman: Bellicosity, that was due in 2014, but to date, remains unreleased, making the series out of continuity.

As featured at the end of season 2 of Comic Book Men, Flanagan does the artwork for the original comic series, Cryptozoic Man. Fellow co-host Bryan Johnson is the author, with Ming Chen and Mike Zapcic helping with character creation. Flanagan provided cover pencils for the first five issues of the Blue Juice Comics series The Accelerators.

=== Songwriting ===
Flanagan wrote the lyrics for a song titled “I Sell Comics.” A contest was held in which listeners of the podcast, “Tell ‘Em Steve-Dave!” submitted entries for music to the song. Courage My Love’s version was chosen as the winner.

=== Music video ===
- Soul Asylum - Cant Even Tell (1994) playing hockey on the Quick Stop roof.

== Personal life ==
Flanagan is married to Debra Flanagan and has two daughters. He also has one grandson.
