= Bryan Johnson (comic book writer) =

American actor, writer, and television personality (born 1967)

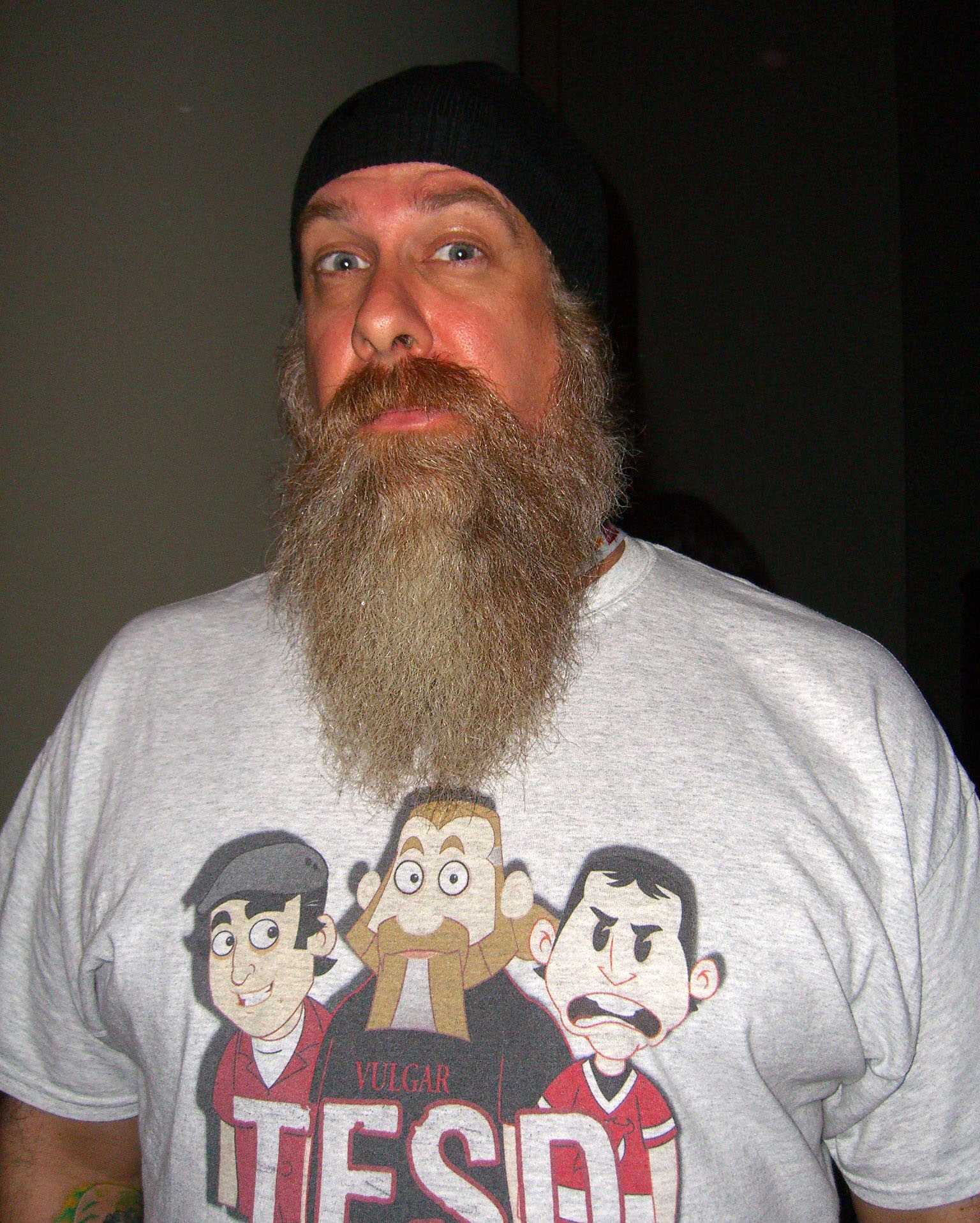
- Johnson at the 2012 New York Comic Con
- Born: Bryan Lee Johnson; 1967 (age 58–59); Highlands, New Jersey, U.S.
- Occupations: Podcaster; writer; filmmaker
- Years active: 1994–present
- Notable work: Tell 'Em Steve-Dave!; Comic Book Men; Vulgar
- Spouse: Maribeth Johnson

Bryan Lee Johnson is an American podcaster, actor, television personality, screenwriter and comic book writer associated with filmmaker Kevin Smith and the View Askewniverse. He is best known by his local fame in New Jersey and appearances in Smith's New Jersey films as comic book store owner Steve-Dave Pulasti. He was also the basis for the Clerks character Randal Graves.

Through his friendship with Smith, he was often involved in his productions until Smith moved to Los Angeles. He wrote and directed one film, Vulgar (2000), for View Askew. He worked briefly at the Los Angeles branch of Smith's comic book store, Jay and Silent Bob's Secret Stash. Since 2010, he has been a co-host of Tell 'Em Steve-Dave!, a podcast created with fellow View Askewniverse staple Walt Flanagan and Brian Quinn of The Tenderloins Comedy Troupe and Impractical Jokers. From 2012 to 2018, Johnson also co-starred on the AMC reality series Comic Book Men. Johnson has also collaborated with Flanagan in creating comics adapted from his screenplays, including the 2004 miniseries Karney and the 2007 miniseries War of the Undead.

== Early life ==
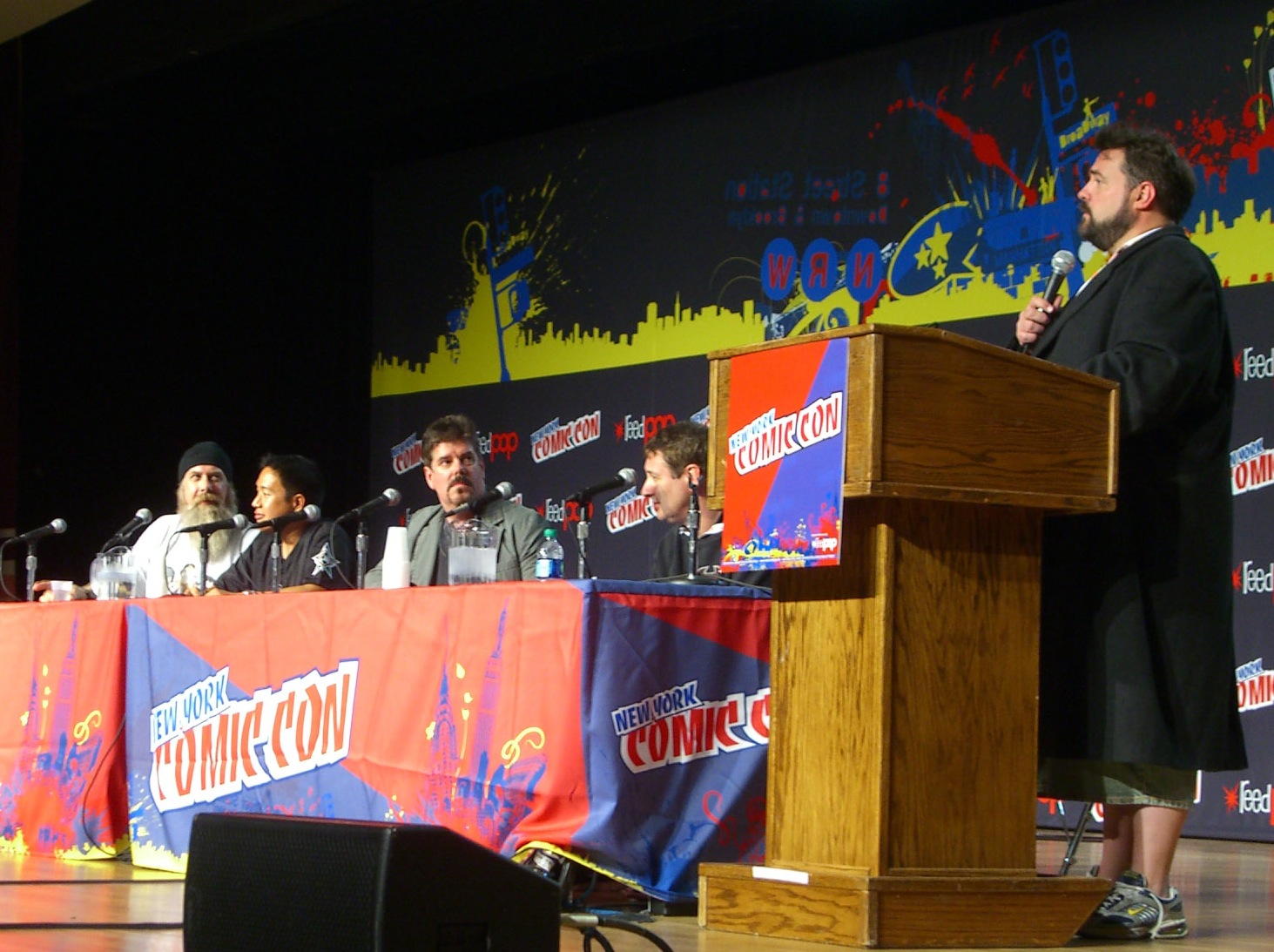
Johnson, at left, with the cast of Comic Book Men

Bryan Lee Johnson was born in Highlands, New Jersey. Johnson attended Highlands Elementary School there (part of the Highlands School District) and Henry Hudson Regional High School, graduating in the mid-1980s.

== Career ==
In late 2009 Johnson began the podcast Tell 'Em Steve-Dave! with his friends Walt Flanagan and Brian "Q" Quinn.

Johnson has discussed his life and work with Kevin Smith in detail in various SmodCo podcasts, including 'Highlands, a Peephole History,' 'Why Bry?' with Kevin Smith, and 'Tell 'Em Steve-Dave,' the podcast he has hosted since Johnson created it in 2009.

On February 12, 2012, the reality television series Comic Book Men premiered, which stars both Johnson and Flanagan.

== Filmography ==
=== Film ===
- Mallrats (1995) as Steve-Dave Pulasti
- Big Helium Dog (1999) as Undercover Jesus
- Dogma (1999) as Protester #1 (Steve-Dave Pulasti)
- Vulgar (2000) (Actor, Writer, Editor, Director) as Syd Gilbert
- Jay and Silent Bob Strike Back (2001) as Steve-Dave Pulasti
- Tell'em Steve-Dave Puppet Theater (2013) as himself
- Jay & Silent Bob's Super Groovy Cartoon Movie (2013) (Voice) Shower Bully 2, Travis the Comic-Hating Bully
- Shooting Clerks (2016) as Comic Book Horndog
- Tell 'em Steve Dave: Makin' Clay (2017) (Writer, Voice) as Bryan Johnson
- Making Fun: The Story of Funko (2018) as himself
- Cool As Hell 2 (2019) as Bryan
- Jay and Silent Bob Reboot (2019) as himself, Steve-Dave Pulasti

=== Television ===
- Clerks: The Animated Series (2000) (Voice) as Steve-Dave Pulasti
- Comic Book Men (2012–2018) as himself
- Talking Bad (2013) as himself
- Bonus Content (2014) as himself
- Creative Continuity (2014) as himself
- Impractical Jokers (2017, 2018) as himself
- Impractical Jokers: After Party (2017) as himself
- Tell 'em Steve Dave Presents: TESD TV (2017) as himself
- Tell 'em Steve-Dave Presents: ElephANTS in the Room (2017) as himself
- 2 Drink Minimum (2018) as himself

=== Comics ===
- Karney (2005)
- War of the Undead (2007)
- Cryptozoic Man (2013)

=== Music video ===
- Soul Asylum - "Cant Even Tell" (1994)
