= Vulgar (film) =

2000 American black comedy crime thriller film

- Theatrical release poster
- Directed by: Bryan Johnson
- Written by: Bryan Johnson
- Produced by: Monica Hampton; Scott Mosier; Kevin Smith
- Starring: Brian O'Halloran; Bryan Johnson; Jerry Lewkowitz; Ethan Suplee; Matthew Maher
- Cinematography: David Klein
- Edited by: Bryan Johnson; Scott Mosier
- Music by: Ryan Shore
- Production companies: View Askew Productions; Chango Productions; Shongo Filmworks Ltd.
- Distributed by: Lions Gate Films
- Release date: September 13, 2000
- Running time: 91 minutes
- Country: United States
- Language: English
- Budget: $120,000 (estimated)

Vulgar is a 2000 American black comedy crime exploitation film written and directed by Bryan Johnson and produced by Monica Hampton for Kevin Smith's View Askew Productions. It features multiple actors from the View Askewniverse. The film is the tale of the character Vulgar, a clown who appeared in the original View Askew Productions logo. Though not a Kevin Smith film, it stars several actors that were cast in other View Askew Productions, such as Brian O'Halloran as the lead character, Smith himself as a gay TV executive, Ethan Suplee as one of the antagonists, Jason Mewes as a car wash employee and black-arms merchant, Scott Mosier as a daytime talk show host and writer/director/editor Bryan Johnson in a supporting role as the lead's best friend, Syd.

Vulgar was released by Lions Gate Films on September 13, 2000. In 2016, Johnson announced plans to create a sequel to Vulgar despite him saying in an interview that he was not going to make a sequel.

== Plot ==
Will Carlson is an around-30 loser who lives in a duplex house apartment in a rundown neighborhood in New Jersey, where he ekes out a living as a birthday party clown in order to pay the rent for his abusive mother's nursing home and the rent on his rundown house. Despite the difficulties of the job, clowning is Will's one escape from the realities of his miserable existence: Will genuinely likes kids, and takes great joy from making them happy on their birthdays.

Struggling to make ends meet, but not wanting to give up his dream job, Will comes up with the idea to be a "bachelor party clown." Will's idea is that men throwing bachelor parties can hire him as a stripper; Will enters the room prior to the "real" entertainment, wearing clown makeup and lingerie, tricking the bachelor into thinking that there was a mix-up and a gay clown stripper has been sent in lieu of a female one. Will invents the persona of Vulgar the Clown (after his friend Syd tells him that the entire idea is "vulgar") and solicits himself in the want-ads. Before long, he is hired to appear at a bachelor party being held at a nearby motel.

When Will arrives for the party — wearing stockings, garters, clown makeup, and a trench-coat — he is attacked and brutally beaten by a middle-aged man, Ed, and his sons Gino and Frankie. The three men then proceed to gang rape Will, taking turns videotaping the attack. The trio hold Will hostage in the motel room for an indeterminate amount of time, during which they subject him to a series of violent and humiliating sexual assaults. They also break a bottle over his head and drug him with hallucinogens. A tearful Will goes home and spends the remainder of the night and part of the next morning crying while he washes himself clean in the bathtub. Syd comes by to see Will. Will tells him of what happened, but swears Syd to secrecy.

Will spends a considerable amount of time after the attack in a crippling depression, which nearly costs him his home. Eventually, Will fulfills a promise to appear as a clown at one of his past clients' children's party. When he gets to the party, Will discovers a hostage crisis is occurring; the father of one of the children, in the middle of divorce proceedings, has kidnapped his own daughter and is threatening to kill her. He agrees to exchange his daughter for his wife. In a near-suicidal reaction, Will sneaks past the police barricade, breaks into the house, and subdues the father. News reporters capture some of the events on film, and before long the story makes national headlines. Will becomes known as "the hero clown;" the attention and outpouring of support breaks him out of his depression, and he is eventually given his own syndicated children's television show.

The media coverage attracts the attention of Ed and his sons (who are still raping young men). They threaten Will with a copy of the tape of his being raped (edited to look like amateur porn) and begin to extort him. When Will tries to pay the men off, they attack him in a bathroom stall. Will finally strikes an agreement with the men wherein he will come to a motel room and "perform" for them, allowing himself to be taken advantage of again, and they will give him all of the copies of the tape; secretly, Will plans to ambush and murder them with the help of Syd.

When the time comes, the gun jams and Will finds himself unable to kill his tormentors. Just as Ed and his sons move in to rape and murder Will, Ed's son Frankie accidentally shoots himself in the face. Then, a shootout ensues with a vagrant lowlife at the hotel, who robs Syd and then plots to do the same to the others. Both the man and Ed's other son (Gino) shoot each other to death. Ed panics, and Will chases him through the motel parking lot to a nearby deserted playground. As Will approaches him with gun-in-hand, Ed has a massive heart attack and dies. Will takes off as he hears police sirens coming. His conscience clear, Will retrieves the tape and goes on to live happily ever after, hosting his television show.

== Cast ==
- Brian O'Halloran as Will Carlson/Flappy/Vulgar, A 20-something loser and clown.
- Bryan Johnson as Syd Gilbert, Vulgar's friend.
- Jerry Lewkowitz as Ed Fanelli, a very violent and sick man.
- Ethan Suplee as Frankie Fanelli, Ed Fanelli's son, killer and rapist.
- Matthew Maher as Gino Fanelli, Ed Fanelli's son and rapist.
- Don Gentile as Sleepy Bum, a neighbor who sleeps.
- Thomas W. Leidner as Large Bum, Bum's friend
- Michael Tierney as Skinny Bum, Bum's son.
- David Gilbert as Delinquent #1, an acquainted leader.
- Erik Johnson as Delinquent #2, an acquainted person.
- Scott Schiaffo as Travis Lee, an abusive wife-beater.
- Darin Johnson as Boy #1
- Brian Hartsgrove as Boy #2
- Aaron Hakeem as Cop #1
- Jamie Schultz as Cop #2

== Extended Cuts ==
=== Extended opening ===
The director's cut DVD features an extended opening, with Will waking up in his bed late for his gig (it is circled and marked on the calendar). He screams at his malfunctioning alarm clock and quickly throws his clothes and make-up on—becoming "Flappy".

=== Extended ending ===
The director's cut DVD features an extended ending, wherein Will finds a note from Syd along with a portion of the newspaper in his dressing room on the Fanelli's death, Ed's heart failure from panic and overdose of crack cocaine, as well as attributing Ed's sons' (as well as the vagrant lowlife's) deaths to a random incidence of criminal violence and natural circumstance. A stunned Will breathlessly determines that the men's deaths were all karmic retribution.

== Music ==
The film's original score was composed by Ryan Shore.

== Release and reception ==
On the review aggregator website Rotten Tomatoes, 22% of 27 critics' reviews are positive, with an average rating of 4/10. The website's consensus reads: "Vulgar more than lives up to its title." Metacritic, which uses a weighted average, assigned the film a score of 5 out of 100, based on 10 critics, indicating "overwhelming dislike". Many remarked Johnson attempted to plagiarize the signature style of Kevin Smith himself. Fan reaction was especially polarized.

Syndicated radio host Howard Stern was sent a pre-release copy of the film. After watching less than half of it, he tossed it in the trash and then spoke poorly of it several times over the span of three weeks. Smith called in on April 26, 2002 and Stern's first question for him was "Why?". Despite Stern's repeated warning not to see the film, others in his studio revealed that his continued bashing of the film only made them more intrigued, and some went to see it anyway just to satisfy their curiosity.

The film premiered at the 2000 Toronto International Film Festival and was theatrically released on April 26, 2002 by Lions Gate Films. Its first major screening was at The Angelika Theater Center in New York City. Vulgar made $13,000 in its first weekend.
