= Walt Flanagan's Dog =

Jay and Silent Bob comic story

"Walt Flanagan's Dog" is one of the first comics written by actor Kevin Smith, published in January 1998. The story, which appears in Oni Double Feature #1, tells the adventure of Jay and Silent Bob having an encounter with Walt Flanagan's dog, Krypto.

== Background ==
In the 1995 film Mallrats, the fictional character Jay remarks that he was chased by a pursuer that was "faster than Walt Flanagan's dog". The line was a reference to Walt Flanagan's real-life dog Brodie, a pocket-sized rat terrier. Flanagan had quit working as a production assistant on the film and had bought Brodie as a small puppy, letting her zoom around an empty lot in the mall, which had been closed for shooting.

== Plot ==
While Jay and Silent Bob deal outside RST Video, Randal Graves calls the cops on them. The duo leaves and ends up smoking marijuana with Walt Flanagan's dog (Flanagan and Steve Dave are practicing strip comic book trivia at the time). The dog gets a "stoner boner" and chases them around New Jersey after Silent Bob pokes it. By the time the dog calms down, it is dawn. Jay and Bob then decide to go to the Eden Prairie Mall for an Orange Julius.

== In the Askewniverse ==
Chronologically, "Walt Flanagan's Dog" is the earliest story to take place in the View Askewniverse. It leads into Mallrats which takes place before Clerks.

== Askewniverse references ==
- The comic features a strip where there is an ambulance in front of the local YMCA. This is a reference to Julie Dwyer's death, which is mentioned in Clerks, Mallrats and Chasing Amy.
- Dante Hicks is talking to Veronica, his girlfriend from Clerks, on the phone in the beginning of the comic. They discuss a game show at the Eden Prairie Mall, a reference to Mallrats.
- One of the usernames on an early internet message board shown in a flashback in Jay & Silent Bob's Super Groovy Cartoon Movie is "Walt Flanagan's Dog".
- One of the usernames on an internet message board shown in Jay & Silent Bob Strike Back is "Walt Flanagan's Dog".
- While not technically in the Askewniverse, the View Askew film Vulgar contains the line "Only humans can be heroes, right? Well tell that to Walt Flanagan's Dog".

Preceded by None	The View Askewniverse Chronology	Succeeded by Mallrats
