= The Flying Car (2002 film) =

- Written by: Kevin Smith
- Directed by: Kevin Smith
- Starring: Brian O'Halloran; Jeff Anderson

Production
- Producers: Kevin Smith; Scott Mosier
- Editors: Scott Mosier; Kevin Smith
- Running time: 6 minutes
- Budget: $15,000

Original release
- Network: NBC
- Release: February 27, 2002

The Flying Car is a 2002 short film written and directed by Kevin Smith. It stars Brian O'Halloran and Jeff Anderson as the View Askewniverse characters Dante Hicks and Randal Graves, who were introduced in Clerks.

The short film was first commissioned by the Ford Motor Company as an inspirational film for its engineers at a yearly meeting, but when presented with Smith's final script, the company objected to the dialogue and dropped the project. Jay Leno later offered to have Smith go ahead with filming for airing on The Tonight Show and it premiered there on February 27, 2002. It also appears on the 10th anniversary Clerks X DVD. The DVD cut is remastered and features an introduction by Kevin Smith.

== Plot ==
While Dante and Randal are stuck in a traffic jam, Randal laments that flying cars, as depicted in The Jetsons, do not exist. He asks Dante what he would hypothetically sacrifice in exchange for ownership of a flying car and its related intellectual property. Randal suggests increasingly ridiculous scenarios, all the while cajoling Dante for selfishly dooming humanity by withholding the car and its inspiration from the masses if he refuses. Dante ultimately agrees to let the car's German inventor cut his foot off with a hacksaw, and to not rescind the deal despite knowing that the inventor and his friends will molest him while he is under anesthesia. Randal expresses disgust that Dante would "do it with a bunch of guys just to get a car".

== Cast ==
- Brian O'Halloran as Dante Hicks
- Jeff Anderson as Randal Graves
