= View Askewniverse =

Fictional universe and media franchise by Kevin Smith

- Created by: Kevin Smith
- Original work: Clerks (1994)

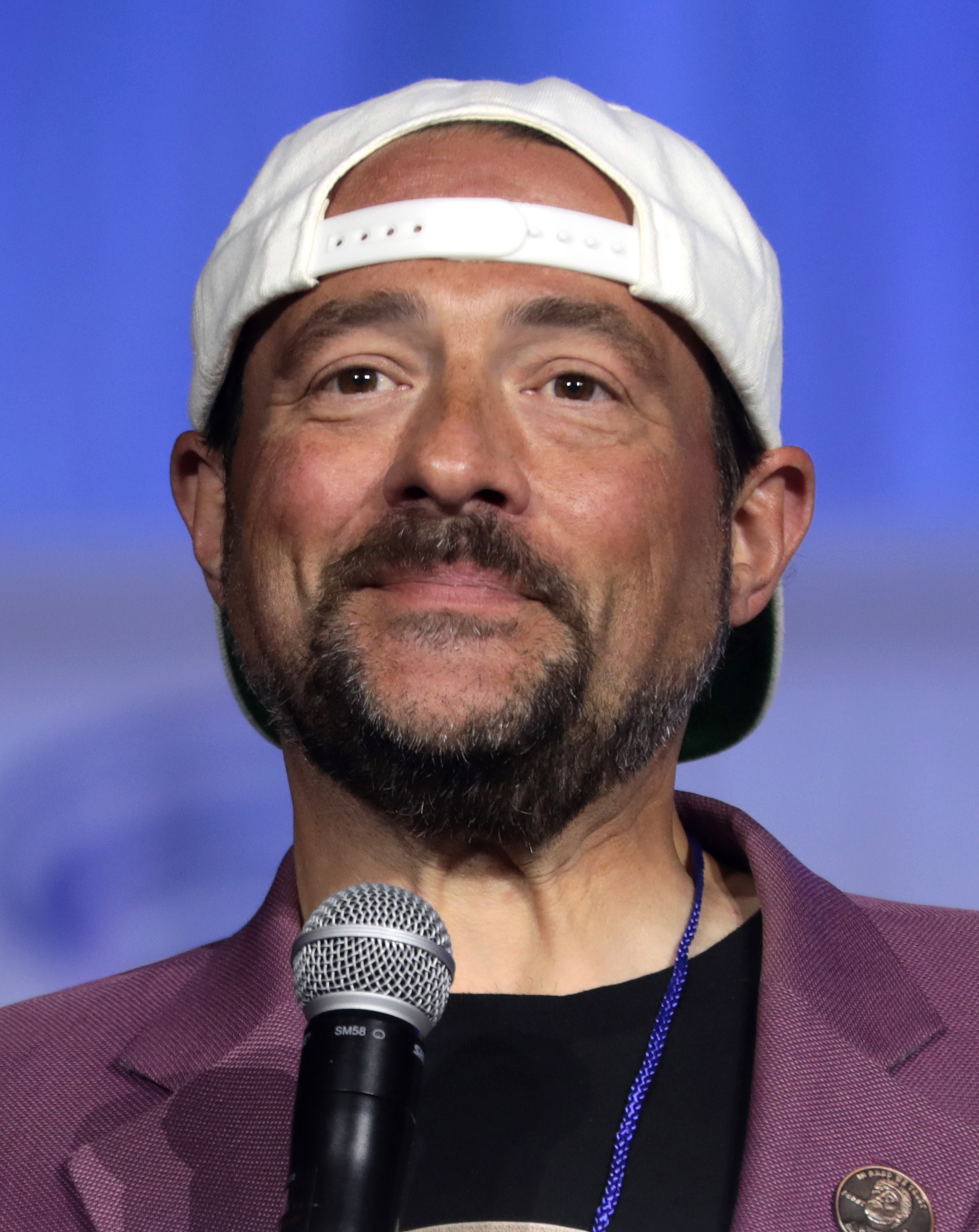
Series creator Kevin Smith in 2022

The View Askewniverse is a fictional universe created by writer/director Kevin Smith, featured in several films, comics and a television series; it is named for Smith's production company, View Askew Productions. The characters Jay and Silent Bob appear in almost all the View Askewniverse media, and characters from one story often reappear or are referred to in others. Smith often casts the same actors for multiple characters in the universe, sometimes even in the same film; Smith himself portrays the character of Silent Bob.

== Setting ==
Smith's recurring characters, settings, and motifs first appeared in his debut film, Clerks. Since then, the main canon has consisted of nine feature films, in addition to several short films, comic books, and a short-lived animated television series. The View Askewniverse is centered on the towns of Leonardo, Highlands, and Red Bank, all located in Monmouth County, central New Jersey. Chasing Amy also takes place partly in New York City, while Dogma, Jay and Silent Bob Strike Back, and Jay and Silent Bob Reboot involve road trips.

== Films ==
Film	U.S. release date	Director	Screenwriter	Producer(s)
Clerks	October 19, 1994	Kevin Smith	Kevin Smith	Scott Mosier and Kevin Smith
Mallrats	October 20, 1995	Kevin Smith	Kevin Smith	James Jacks, Sean Daniel, and Scott Mosier
Chasing Amy	April 4, 1997	Kevin Smith	Kevin Smith	Scott Mosier
Dogma	November 12, 1999	Kevin Smith	Kevin Smith	Scott Mosier
Jay and Silent Bob Strike Back	August 24, 2001	Kevin Smith	Kevin Smith	Scott Mosier
Clerks II	July 21, 2006	Kevin Smith	Kevin Smith	Scott Mosier
Jay & Silent Bob's Super Groovy Cartoon Movie!	April 20, 2013	Steve Stark	Kevin Smith	Jason Mewes and Jordan Monsanto
Jay and Silent Bob Reboot	October 15, 2019	Kevin Smith	Kevin Smith	Liz Destro and Jordan Monsanto
Clerks III	September 13, 2022	Kevin Smith	Kevin Smith	Liz Destro and Jordan Monsanto

=== Clerks (1994) ===
The first film in the series of the View Askewniverse, Clerks follows a day in the lives of two store clerks, Dante Hicks (Brian O'Halloran) and Randal Graves (Jeff Anderson). Dante is called into work at the Quick Stop convenience store on his day off until the boss can relieve him at noon. As Dante serves a succession of customers, he repeatedly complains that he is "not even supposed to be here today". Randal works at RST Video next door, although he spends almost the entire day relaxing at the Quick Stop. Dante learns he will be working all day, and decides to close the store for brief periods to play hockey on the roof and to attend a memorial service for his ex-girlfriend. An old flame now engaged surprises him with a visit. The two had been talking on the phone for months and after seeing each other again they are keen to reunite and leave their current relationships.

=== Mallrats (1995) ===
Two young men, Brodie Bruce and T.S. Quint, hang out at a mall after being dumped by their girlfriends, while also trying to avoid the wrath of Shannon Hamilton. The film occurs one day before the events of Clerks.

=== Chasing Amy (1997) ===
A heterosexual man, Holden McNeil, falls in love with a lesbian woman, Alyssa Jones, causing conflict with his homophobic best friend, Banky Edwards, with whom he has created a comic book called Bluntman and Chronic based upon their friends Jay and Silent Bob.

=== Dogma (1999) ===
The world ends if two angels enter a church in New Jersey and Jesus' last scion, Jay and Silent Bob, and the thirteenth Apostle have to stop them.

=== Jay and Silent Bob Strike Back (2001) ===
Jay and Silent Bob embark on a road-trip to Hollywood to try to stop production of a Bluntman and Chronic movie. Within the film, the Bluntman and Chronic movie was to be based on the comic made by the protagonists of Chasing Amy.

=== Clerks II (2006) ===
Roughly ten years after Clerks, an accident destroys the Quick Stop; as a result, Dante and Randal are now employed in the fast food industry.

=== Jay & Silent Bob's Super Groovy Cartoon Movie! (2013) ===
The animated film depicts the events within the Bluntman and Chronic comic written by the protagonists of Chasing Amy, which was to be adapted into a movie in Jay and Silent Bob Strike Back. Kevin Smith adapted the script from the Bluntman and Chronic comics story he had originally written as a companion piece to the film Jay and Silent Bob Strike Back.

=== Jay and Silent Bob Reboot (2019) ===
After losing the legal rights to their names over a film reboot of Bluntman and Chronic, Jay and Silent Bob travel across the United States to try to prevent the reboot from being made.

=== Clerks III (2022) ===
Now co-owners of the Quick Stop, Dante and Randal are staring down middle age when Randal gets the idea to make a movie about their lives behind the counter. With Dante reluctantly on board, the two set out to capture the absurd conversations, eccentric customers, and hard truths that have shaped their years in the store. What begins as a goofy project turns into a chaotic but heartfelt look at friendship, regret, and the strange poetry of clerking.

=== Upcoming ===
==== Twilight of the Mallrats (TBA) ====
On March 12, 2015, Smith confirmed that Mallrats 2 was being written and was slated to begin shooting in May 2016. In April 2015, Smith announced that Mallrats 2 would be his next film, instead of Clerks III as originally intended, and would begin production the following year. In January 2020, Smith announced that development on Mallrats 2 had started up again, under a new title, Twilight of the Mallrats. It was planned that Mallrats star Shannen Doherty would reprise her role in the sequel; however, she died in July 2024. A few months later, however, Smith suggested that the sequel could still be made, reframed as a tribute to Doherty.

=== Related films ===
Film	U.S. release date	Director(s)	Screenwriter(s)	Producers
Drawing Flies	November 24, 1996	Matt Gissing & Malcolm Ingram	Matt Gissing & Malcolm Ingram	Kevin Smith, Matt Gissing, Scott Mosier & Malcolm Ingram
Scream 3	February 4, 2000	Wes Craven	Ehren Kruger	Cathy Konrad, Kevin Williamson & Marianne Maddalena
Zack and Miri Make a Porno	October 31, 2008	Kevin Smith	Kevin Smith	Scott Mosier
Madness in the Method	August 2, 2019	Jason Mewes	Dominic Burns & Chris Anastasi	Rob Weston & Dominic Burns

- Drawing Flies: Much of the cast of Mallrats featured in a simultaneous View Askew Productions film titled, Drawing Flies. A couple of actors portray the same characters, with Kevin Smith credited as Silent Bob. Smith also wore the same wardrobe within the two films.
- Scream 3: Jay and Silent Bob appear in Scream 3, during a scene which shows the pair in-studio. Jay comedically mistakes one of the main protagonists, named Gale Weathers-Riley, for television reporter Connie Chung and sarcastically asks her about Maury Povich.
- Zack and Miri Make a Porno: Though Smith previously stated that the film is not set within the Askewniverse, he later added the character of Brandon St. Randy as a part of Jay and Silent Bob Reboot. The character features as the lawyer of Jay, Silent Bob, and Saban Films.
- Madness in the Method: Directed by Jason Mewes, from a script co-written by Chris Anastasi and Dominic Burns, the film is produced by Rob Weston of Straightwire Entertainment Group and features the characters Jay and Silent Bob. The film was released on August 2, 2019.

== Short films ==
- The Flying Car: A short film featuring Dante and Randal, that was produced for The Tonight Show with Jay Leno in 2002.
- Clerks: The Lost Scene: An animated short, that was produced in 2004 for Clerks X (10th anniversary DVD). The release is based on a scene previously off-screen from Clerks, that had previously been depicted in the comics.

== Television ==
- Clerks: The Animated Series: A traditionally animated series, that consisted of six episodes featuring the main characters from the Clerks film. The series aired on ABC in 2000, only to be discontinued after two episodes were released on network television. The entire series was later released directly to DVD in 2001.
- Clerks: A live-action pilot episode, for a television series adaptation, based on Clerks. Kevin Smith had no involvement with the television series' adaptation.
- Jay and Silent Bob Shorts: A series of short skits, which aired on MTV.
- Jay and Silent Bob Rename Your Favorite TV Show: Released throughout 2005, as a portion of I Love the '90s. The routine was released on VH1.
- I Love the '90s: Part Deux: The second release from VH1, as a part of the I Love the '90s series. The show released in 2005.
- Degrassi: The Next Generation: The series adapted a fictional filming of Jay and Silent Bob Go Canadian, Eh?, over the span of three of its episodes.
- My Name Is Earl: The series, which stars Jason Lee and Ethan Suplee who have co-starred in numerous films directed by Kevin Smith, made references to the films.
- The Flash (2014 TV series): Jay and Silent Bob cameo as security guards in the episode "Null and Annoyed".

== Digital ==
=== Jay and Silent Bob VR ===
In 2018, STX Entertainment announced that their Surreal division was working with Kevin Smith on a VR series that would star Jay and Silent Bob.

== Recurring cast and characters ==
Smith often casts the same actors for multiple characters in the universe, sometimes even in the same film. This is most notable in Jay and Silent Bob Strike Back, in which several actors play multiple characters from earlier View Askewniverse films.

Smith and Jason Mewes are the only actors to appear in every film as the same characters. Two other actors have appeared in every film, as different characters: Walt Flanagan and Brian O'Halloran, with O'Halloran always appearing as a member of the Hicks family (most notably Dante).

The more notable recurring actors include:

Actor	Clerks	Mallrats	Chasing Amy	Dogma	Clerks: The Animated Series	Jay and Silent Bob Strike Back	Clerks II	Jay & Silent Bob’s Super Groovy Cartoon Movie	Jay and Silent Bob Reboot	Clerks III
Jason Mewes	Jay	Jay	Jay	Jay	Jay	Jay	Jay	Jay	Jay	Jay
Kevin Smith	Silent Bob	Silent Bob	Silent Bob	Silent Bob	Silent Bob	Silent Bob	Silent Bob	Silent Bob Himself	Silent Bob Himself	Silent Bob
Walt Flanagan	Woolen cap smoker various unnamed characters	Walt the Fanboy	Walt the Fanboy (deleted scene)	Walt the Fanboy (Protester #2)	Walt the Fanboy	Walt the Fanboy	Woolen cap smoker	Shower Bully 3 Giagra ad narrator	Walt the Fanboy Himself	Hockey player Egg checker
Brian O'Halloran	Dante Hicks	Gill Hicks	Jim Hicks	Grant Hicks	Dante Hicks	Dante Hicks	Dante Hicks	Dante Hicks	Dante Hicks Grant Hicks Himself	Dante Hicks
Scott Mosier	Willam Black angry hockey-playing customer	Roddy	Tracer collector	Bus passenger	Willam Black (uncredited)	Willam Black Extras Wrangler	Concerned Father	The General Quick-Stop hipster guy		Willam Black (Auditioner 14)
Jeff Anderson	Randal Graves			Gun shop clerk	Randal Graves	Randal Graves	Randal Graves			Randal Graves
Ernest O'Donnell	Rick Derris		Bystander	Reporter (deleted scene)		Cop			Himself	Hockey player Rick Derris
Vincent Pereira	Various unnamed characters		Startled pinball player			Quick Stop customer				
John Willyung	Dante's killer (deleted scene)		Cohee Lundin			Passerby			Himself	Cohee Lundin
David Klein	Various unnamed characters	Bald comic fan								
Virginia Sheridan (née Smith)	Animal masturbator customer		Comic-Con woman						Alyssa's Wife	Caged animal masturbator
Grace Smith	Milk Maid						Milk Maid		Chronic Con Attendee	Auditioner 18
Marilyn Ghigliotti	Veronica Loughran								Herself	Veronica Loughran
Scott Schiaffo	Chewlies Rep								Himself	Chewlies Rep
Lisa Spoonauer	Caitlin Bree				Caitlin Bree					
Kimberly Gharbi (née Loughran)	Heather Jones			Woman in elevator (uncredited)						Heather Jones
Ed Hapstak	Sanford	Sanford								
Joey Lauren Adams	Alyssa Jones (2004 special edition)	Gwen Turner	Alyssa Jones			Alyssa Jones			Alyssa Jones	
Bryan Johnson		Steve-Dave	Steve-Dave (deleted scene)	Steve-Dave (Protester #1)	Steve-Dave	Steve-Dave		Shower Bully 2 Travis the Comic-Hating Bully	Himself	Hockey player
Jason Lee		Brodie Bruce	Banky Edwards	Azrael		Brodie Bruce Banky Edwards	Lance Dowds		Brodie Bruce	
Ben Affleck		Shannon Hamilton	Holden McNeil	Bartleby		Holden McNeil himself	Gawking guy		Holden McNeil	Boston John (Auditioner 11)
Ethan Suplee		Willam Black	Fan	Golgothan (voice)			Teen #2			Willam Black (Auditioner 13)
Shannen Doherty		Rene Mosier				Herself				
Renee Humphrey		Tricia Jones				Tricia Jones				
Malcolm Ingram		Creepy staring guy				Creepy staring guy	Pissing customer			
Stan Lee		Himself						Himself	Himself	
Dwight Ewell			Hooper X	Kane the gang leader		Hooper X				
Matt Damon			Shawn Oran (TV executive #2)	Loki		Himself			Loki	
Guinevere Turner			Singer	Bus station attendant						
Carmen Llywelyn			Kim			Daphne look-alike				
Dan Etheridge				Priest	Plug	Deputy				
Chris Rock				Rufus		Chaka Luther King				
George Carlin				Cardinal Glick		Blowjob-giving hitchhiker				
Alanis Morissette				God		God				
Paul Dini					George Lucas	Bluntman & Chronic Loader Clapper				
Shannon Elizabeth						Justice Faulken			Justice Faulken	
Jennifer Schwalbach Smith						Missy "Miss" McKenzie	Emma Bunting	Blunt-Girl	Missy "Miss" McKenzie	Emma Bunting
Jason Biggs						Himself			Himself	
James Van Der Beek						Himself			Himself	
Jake Richardson						Teen #1			Teen #1	
Harley Quinn Smith						Baby Silent Bob	Kid in window		Millenium "Milly" Faulken	Millenium "Milly" Faulken
Nick Fehlinger						Teen #2			Teen #2	
Rosario Dawson							Becky Scott		Reggie Faulken	Becky Scott
Trevor Fehrman							Elias Grover			Elias Grover
Ming Chen								Shower Bully 1	Himself	Hockey player
Mike Zapcic								Bank Robber Cop 2	Himself	Hockey player
Marc Bernardin								Mayor of Asbury Park	Sleepy Blunt-Fan	Lando

== Comics ==
- Clerks.: A three-part comic book series published in the late-'90s, which featured the continuing adventures of the main characters from Clerks.
- Chasing Dogma: A four-part series that details the adventures of Jay and Silent Bob, between the events of Chasing Amy and Dogma. Various elements from the story-arc were adapted into Jay and Silent Bob Strike Back.
- Bluntman and Chronic: Adapting the fictionally "created" comics by Holden McNeil and Banky Edwards in Chasing Amy, the series was published to coincide with the release of Jay and Silent Bob Strike Back.
- Jay and Silent Bob in Walt Flanagan's Dog: A story that was featured in Oni Double Feature #1.
- Where's the Beef?: A 20-page comic which adds further details to the events that were depicted in the opening scenes of Clerks II.
- Chasing Amy: In Japan, the screenplay of Chasing Amy was adapted into a novel by Kenichi Eguchi and published by Aoyama Publishing. It is a book that is roughly half-novel, half-manga, with Moyoco Anno providing the art for the comic book pages.
- Green Arrow: Jay and Silent Bob had a brief appearance in one panel of Green Arrow, Vol. 3 #6. The characters were depicted standing outside Jason Blood's Safe House in Star City. This issue was written by Kevin Smith during his 15-issue story-arc of the titular character.
- Angel: After the Fall: Demonic versions of Jay and Silent Bob can be seen in one panel, in issue #5. The characters are shown standing outside of a cafe in the safe haven of Silverlake. Writer Brian Lynch confirmed the reference and attributed their inclusion to artist Franco Urru.
- Aoi House: Though the pair are not identified by name, Jay and Silent Bob appear in the manga, in the background of the mall.
- Quick Stops: A four-part black and white comic series that focuses on the various characters of the View Askewniverse and published by Dark Horse Comics.
- Archie Meets Jay and Silent Bob: A one shot comic set after Clerks III where Archie gets a summer job working at the Quick Stop and meets/befriends Randall, Jay, and Silent Bob. Published by Archie Comics in collaboration with Secret Stash Press.

== Video games ==
A beat 'em up video game titled Jay and Silent Bob: Chronic Blunt Punch was funded in April 2016, and has yet to be released. The game began production after being successfully crowdfunded on Fig.

Another beat 'em up video game titled Jay and Silent Bob: Mall Brawl released to the backers of Chronic Blunt Punch for free on Steam in 2020. It is available to purchase digitally on Steam, Nintendo Switch, and PlayStation 4. Limited Run Games released a physical edition, with pre-orders becoming available for purchase on April 20, 2021. An NES port was also released shortly after its launch on modern platforms.

Jay and Silent Bob appear as cameo characters in Randal's Monday, a point-and-click adventure game published by Daedalic Entertainment. Jason Mewes reprises his role as Jay. The main character of the game is named Randal Hicks (a name combining both Randal Graves and Dante Hicks, the protagonists of Clerks), and is voiced by Jeff Anderson, the actor for Randal Graves in the View Askewniverse films. However, the character and plot of the game bear no relation to Clerks or the View Askewniverse.

Jay and Silent Bob appear and voice themselves in 2024's Call of Duty Black Ops 6. They appear in 2 bundles, named Tracer Pack: Jay and Silent Bob, and Tracer Pack: Bluntman and Chronic. The bundles appeared during a 420 event, and have remained in the game ever since.

== Additional crew and production details ==
Film	Crew/Detail					
Film	Composer(s)	Cinematographer	Editor(s)	Production companies	Distributing companies	Running time
Film series
Clerks	Benji Gordon	David Klein	Kevin Smith; Scott Mosier	Miramax Films; View Askew Productions	Miramax, LLC	1hr 32mins
Mallrats	Ira Newborn	David Klein	Paul Dixon	Alphaville Films; Gramercy Pictures (I); View Askew Productions	Gramercy Pictures	1hr 34mins
Chasing Amy	David Pirner	David Klein	Kevin Smith; Scott Mosier	Too Askew Prod., Inc. View Askew Productions	Miramax, LLC	1hr 53mins
Dogma	Howard Shore	Robert Yeoman	Kevin Smith; Scott Mosier	STKstudio; View Askew Productions	Lions Gate Films	2hrs 8mins
Jay and Silent Bob Strike Back	James L. Venable	Jamie Anderson	Kevin Smith; Scott Mosier	Miramax Films; Dimension Films; View Askew Productions	Miramax, LLC	1hr 44mins
Clerks II	James L. Venable	David Klein	Kevin Smith	The Weinstein Company; View Askew Productions	Metro-Goldwyn-Mayer; Metro-Goldwyn-Mayer Distributing Corp.	1hr 37mins
Jay & Silent Bob's Super Groovy Cartoon Movie!	James L. Venable		Josh Earl	SModcast Pictures; View Askew Productions	Phase 4 Films	1hr 3mins
Jay and Silent Bob Reboot	James L. Venable	Yaron Levy	Kevin Smith	Mewesings; Destro Films; Miramax Films; Intercut Capital; Hideout Pictures; SModcast Pictures; View Askew Productions; Skit Bags Entertainment	Saban Films	1hr 45mins
Clerks III	James L. Venable	Learan Kahanov	Kevin Smith	SModcast Pictures; View Askew Productions	Lionsgate Films	1hr 34mins
Related films
Drawing Flies	Murray Stiller	Brian Pearson	Matt Gissing; Malcolm Ingram	View Askew Productions	View Askew Productions	1hr 16mins
Scream 3	Marco Beltrami	Peter Deming	Patrick Lussier	Konrad Pictures; Dimension Films; Miramax Film Corp. Craven/Maddalena Films	Dimension Films	1hr 47mins
Zack and Miri Make a Porno	James L. Venable	David Klein	Kevin Smith	View Askew Productions	The Weinstein Company	1hr 42mins
Madness in the Method	Si Begg	Vince Knight	Adam Sykes	Malibu Films; Autumnwood Media; Straightwire Films; Hawthorn Productions; Red Rock Entertainment; Happy Hour Productions; Skit Bags Entertainment	Cinedigm	1hr 39mins

== Franchise chronology ==
- Jay and Silent Bob in Walt Flanagan's Dog
- Mallrats
- Clerks
- Clerks: The Animated Series
- The Flying Car
- Clerks.
- Chasing Amy
- Chasing Dogma
- Dogma
- Jay and Silent Bob Strike Back
- Bluntman and Chronic
- Where's the Beef?
- Clerks II
- Zack and Miri Make a Porno
- Jay and Silent Bob Reboot
- Clerks III
- Archie Meets Jay and Silent Bob

== Cancelled projects ==
Busing

Following Clerks, Smith wrote a film called Busing for Hollywood Pictures, a now-defunct Disney studio. It was described as "Clerks in a restaurant." The film was announced around 1994 and was intended to be part of the View Askewniverse. The film was not made, but the film was featured at the end of Jay and Silent Bob Strike Back as a poster parodying the Clerks poster.

Name

A follow-up to Chasing Amy, Smith wrote a new film set in the View Askewniverse starring the trio from Amy that was not a sequel. Smith said "it was kind of porn-bent." Affleck and Adams were interested in doing the project, but plans eventually fell through. Smith's efforts to develop a project about pornography led to the 2008 film, Zack and Miri Make a Porno. Smith abandoned Name in favor of Dogma.

Dogma II

In late November 2005, Smith responded to talk of a possible sequel to Dogma on the ViewAskew.com message boards:

So weird you should ask this, because ever since 9/11, I have been thinking about a sequel of sorts. I mean, the worst terrorist attack on American soil was religiously bent. In the wake of said attack, the leader of the "Free World" outed himself as pretty damned Christian. In the last election, rather than a quagmire war abroad, the big issue was whether or not gay marriage was moral. Back when I made Dogma, I always maintained that another movie about religion wouldn't be forthcoming, as Dogma was the product of 28 years of religious and spiritual meditation, and I'd kinda shot my wad on the subject. Now? I think I might have more to say. And, yes, the Last Scion would be at the epicenter of it. And she'd have to be played by Alanis. And we'd need a bigger budget, because the entire third act would be the Apocalypse. Scary thing is this: the film would have to touch on Islam. And unlike the Catholic League, when those cats don't like what you do, they issue a death warrant on your ass. And now that I've got a family, I'm not as free to stir the shit-pot as I was when I was single, back when I made Dogma. I mean, now I've gotta think about more than my own safety and well-being. But regardless – yeah, a Dogma followup's been swimming around in my head for some time now.

Over a decade later, there has apparently been no further discussion. But in October 2017, Smith revealed that he no longer desired to make any new religious films.

Near the same time as the cancellation, just weeks before the Weinstein scandal broke to the public, Harvey Weinstein pitched to Smith about doing a sequel. Not much came from this pitch, but it was just a mere idea for Weinstein. According to Smith in an interview with Business Insider, he recalls:

I said, 'Hey, how are you?' And he goes, 'You know, we have Dogma, I just realized, and we got to get it out there again.' I said, 'We do! People online are always asking where they can get it. And he then goes, 'You know, that movie had a big cast, we might even be able to do a sequel.' And I was like, 'Yeah man, right on. I might think about that.' And he was like, 'We'll talk.' And a week later The New York Times story breaks. I felt sick to my stomach.

Smith believes that he only got the call because, as he believes, "It was him looking to see who was a friend still because his life was about to shift completely."

Clerks: Sell Out

For several years following the cancellation of Clerks: The Animated Series, Smith announced plans to make an animated film. He revealed in a commentary on Episode 6 that it would go theatrical (with the hopes to win an Academy Award for Best Animated Feature), but later made plans to go direct-to-video. The basic plot involved Dante and Randal making a movie about their lives at the Quick Stop, a reference to the production of the original film. In an interview, Kevin Smith expanded on the delays surrounding the film. He stated that when Harvey and Bob Weinstein left Miramax, owned at the time by The Walt Disney Company, the split was not completely amicable. The rights to the Clerks television series were still owned by Disney, who as a result were reluctant to work with The Weinstein Company, throwing the future of Clerks: Sell Out into question. At the 2007 Cornell Q&A, Smith said due to the Miramax/Weinstein argument "you will see a Jay and Silent Bob cartoon before Clerks: Sell Out."

Despite the fact that Sell Out might not get made, Smith's new script for the long-awaited Clerks III will follow the original plot from the animated film.
