= Clerks II =

2006 film directed by Kevin Smith

- Theatrical release poster
- Directed by: Kevin Smith
- Written by: Kevin Smith
- Produced by: Scott Mosier
- Starring: Jeff Anderson; Brian O'Halloran; Rosario Dawson; Trevor Fehrman; Jennifer Schwalbach; Jason Mewes
- Cinematography: David Klein
- Edited by: Kevin Smith
- Music by: James L. Venable
- Production companies: The Weinstein Company; View Askew Productions
- Distributed by: Metro-Goldwyn-Mayer
- Release dates: May 26, 2006 (Cannes); July 21, 2006 (United States)
- Running time: 97 minutes
- Country: United States
- Language: English
- Budget: $5 million
- Box office: $26.9 million

Clerks II is a 2006 American black comedy film written and directed by Kevin Smith. It is the sequel to Clerks (1994) and the sixth feature film to be set in the View Askewniverse. The film stars Brian O'Halloran, Jeff Anderson, Rosario Dawson, Trevor Fehrman, Jennifer Schwalbach Smith, Jason Mewes, and Smith, and picks up with Dante Hicks, Randal Graves and Jay and Silent Bob ten years after the events of the previous film. Unlike the first film, which was shot in black and white, this film was shot mostly in color.

The film screened out of competition at the 2006 Cannes Film Festival and won the Audience Award at the 2006 Edinburgh International Film Festival before receiving a theatrical release on July 21, 2006 by Metro-Goldwyn-Mayer to critical and commercial success, grossing $27 million worldwide from a $5 million budget. A third film was released in 2022.

== Plot ==
Ten years after the events of the first film, Dante Hicks arrives at the Quick Stop convenience store, only to find the store on fire after Randal Graves, accidentally left the coffee pot on the night before. With the store destroyed in the fire, Dante and Randal begin working at a Mooby's fast food restaurant along with devout Christian teenager Elias Grover and their manager Becky Scott. A year later, Dante is planning to leave his minimum wage lifestyle and move to Florida with his wealthy but overbearing fiancée Emma Bunting, whose parents will provide them with a home and a car wash business to run as wedding gifts. Jay and Silent Bob have followed Dante and Randal, and now loiter outside of Mooby's. Although they no longer use drugs (after being arrested for possession, sent to rehab, and supposedly becoming devout Born again Christians), the duo continue to deal drugs and perform their typical antics in the parking lot.

Dante tells Becky that he is worried about dancing at his wedding, so she takes him up to the restaurant's roof to teach him some moves. Dante releases his inhibitions and begins dancing to The Jackson 5's ABC. When the song ends, Dante, confesses his love for Becky. Becky then reveals that she's pregnant as a result of a one-night stand they had at work, and Dante promises not to tell anyone. However, he tells Randal and threatens him not to say anything. but Becky finds out and furiously drives off. Randal encourages Dante to leave to search of Becky, so he can set up a surprise going away party for him. Randal hires "Kinky Kelly and the Sexy Stud," a donkey show act, complete with a fog machine, for the party. When Dante returns, he mistakes the fog for fire and calls the fire department. He enters the party and discovers that it's not a fire, and proceeds to watch with Randal, Jay, Silent Bob, and a very drunk/stoned Elias.

The group discovers that "Kinky Kelly" is, in fact, the donkey, while the man, whom Randal thought to be the pimp, is "The Sexy Stud". When Becky returns, she admits that she loves Dante too, and they kiss. Emma arrives with a cake she made for Dante, and she knees Dante in the crotch, dumps the cake over his head before storming off in tears. The fire and police departments arrive and Dante, Randal, Elias, Jay, Silent Bob, and The Sexy Stud are arrested as a result of the show. In jail, Dante gets into a heated argument with Randal, angry with him for ruining his life and expresses his eagerness to start a new life without him, while Randal becomes indignant and condemns Dante for his willingness to abandon their friendship, revealing how upset he is that Dante is moving. Randal proposes that they buy the Quick Stop and re-open it themselves, although Dante says that neither have the money to do it. Jay and Silent Bob offer to lend them the money provided they can hang out outside of the store anytime they want without the police being called.

Dante is uncertain, prompting Randal to emotionally confess his fear of losing Dante. Moved by Randal's confession, Dante agrees to the proposition. After they're released Dante, proposes to Becky, who happily accepts. After both the Quick Stop and RST Video are rebuilt, Dante and Randal hire Elias to work at the video store. In the very last scene, with the stores open, Dante tells Randal, both having finally taken control of their lives, "Can you feel it? Today is the first day of the rest of our lives." The color then evaporates from the film and the camera pulls back to reveal the milk maid from the first movie still going through all the gallons.

== Cast ==
- Brian O'Halloran as Dante Hicks
- Jeff Anderson as Randal Graves
- Rosario Dawson as Becky Scott
- Trevor Fehrman as Elias Grover
- Jennifer Schwalbach as Emma Bunting
- Jason Mewes as Jay
- Kevin Smith as Silent Bob
- Jason Lee as Lance Dowds
- Zak Knutson as Sexy Stud
- Wanda Sykes as Angry customer
- Earthquake as Angry customer's husband
- Ethan Suplee as Weed customer
- Ben Affleck as Gawking customer
- Kevin Weisman as Lord of the Rings geek
- Scott Mosier as Concerned Father
- Walt Flanagan as Quick Stop Customer

== Production ==
=== Development ===
In 1999, the original title was slated to be Clerks 2: Hardly Clerkin' (cf. Jerry Lewis's Hardly Working), as seen in the credits of Dogma. Smith later modified the title to The Passion of the Clerks, lampooning the title of Mel Gibson's The Passion of the Christ. According to the DVD documentary, the title was changed to simply Clerks II, due to negative reaction to the "Passion" title. The film was shot from September to November 2005. It was originally scheduled for a 2005 release, and then a January 2006 release, but the production was pushed back due to other projects and Kevin Smith's involvement in the romantic comedy Catch and Release.

Smith released production diaries on the Clerks II website (see links below). They chronicle the entire making of the film from the first rehearsals all the way through to the final release. Some of these web diaries are also available on the two-disc DVD of the film. Smith released a Web-only teaser trailer on the Clerks II website on January 9, 2006, and a web-only trailer on April 2, 2006. Smith also released several shorts featuring action figures from his previous films to promote the film.

Before the release of the film, Smith had mentioned releasing an MP3 file commentary to be downloaded and listened to in movie theaters via iPod. Ultimately, theater owners and exhibitors objected, and the plan was scrapped. The abandoned commentary, featuring Smith, Scott Mosier and Jeff Anderson, is included on the DVD.

The bookend Quick Stop scenes are in black and white (to simulate the original visual style of Clerks), while the rest of the film is in color. Smith has said that much of the film's color was desaturated almost to the point where the film had a similar texture to the first film. The contrast in color saturation used can be seen in the "ABC" sequence in which a more vibrant and saturated color temperature is used to give a warm and sunny look that adds to the playful nature of the piece.

On the film's MySpace account, a contest was held in which the first 10,000 MySpace users who added Clerks II as a friend would have their name in the theatrical and DVD end credits; the list follows the View Askew and Weinstein Company logos. The names are not present in the credits on the Region 2 DVD.

=== Locations ===
The Mooby's restaurant was a shut-down Burger King at 8572 Stanton Ave in Buena Park, California (near Knott's Berry Farm); it has since been demolished. The final days of principal photography were filmed at the Quick Stop and RST Video store in Leonardo, New Jersey, with some exceptions, the most notable being the go-kart scene, which was shot at Speedzone in Industry, California. The opening sequence where Randal and Dante are driving to work is a montage of Route 35, mostly in Middletown, New Jersey.

=== Casting ===
Brian O'Halloran, Jeff Anderson, Jason Mewes, and Kevin Smith all reprised their roles from the first film.

According to the DVD commentary, Kevin Smith originally wanted to cast his wife Jennifer Schwalbach Smith as Becky. Executive producer Harvey Weinstein objected, however, wanting a known actress to play the role for marketing reasons. Other actresses that Smith had met with were Sarah Silverman and Bryce Dallas Howard who both declined. Smith recalls having lunch with Howard who said she was interested in the film but ultimately passed in order to do Lady in the Water. Silverman said she didn't want to play the Becky character as she had been cast as girlfriends in numerous other productions and feared type-casting, but loved the script and would have been more than willing to play the part of Randal Graves. Rachel Weisz was another name the studio considered, but Smith figured she would turn the role down and never offered her the part. Ellen Pompeo expressed an interest but could not commit due to scheduling difficulties with Grey's Anatomy. Finally, the role was offered to Rosario Dawson who loved the script. She later said that reading the "donkey show" scene sealed the deal for her. Schwalbach Smith was given the secondary female role of Emma Bunting. Smith also cast his daughter Harley Quinn Smith as the little girl Dante waves to in the window of a restaurant and his mother Grace as the Milk Maid, reprising her role from the first film. Walt Flanagan makes a cameo appearance as a customer who asks for a "pack of cigarettes" (after the film changes from color to black and white), in a nod to the first film as well.

The character of Elias was played by Trevor Fehrman who had previously worked in Anderson's film Now You Know. Smith saw him in the film and was impressed enough to give him a part. In keeping with Smith's tradition of casting actors that he has previously worked with, both Jason Lee and Ben Affleck had parts in the film. Lee played Lance Dowds and Affleck played a random Mooby's customer. Both actors filmed their scenes during off days of filming My Name is Earl and Smokin' Aces. After finding no one else who could pull off being the Sexy Stud, Smith turned to crew member Zak Knutson to fill the role.

== Release ==
=== Rating ===
The film was originally planned to be released without an MPAA film rating, in order to avoid receiving an NC-17. Smith claimed "If we put it in front of the ratings board they'd be like, 'You're insane. We have to create a new rating for that.'" However, he later submitted it, and it received an R rating without any edits.

=== Box office ===
The film opened in 2,150 theaters and grossed $10.1 million domestically in its first weekend. The film's theatrical gross was $24.1 million domestically, plus an additional $2.8 million from other territories foreign, against its production budget of $5 million.

== Reception ==
Clerks II holds a 63% approval rating on review aggregator website Rotten Tomatoes, based on 166 reviews with an average rating of 6.10/10. The website's critical consensus reads, "Clerks II dishes up much of the graphic humor and some of the insight that made the 1994 original a cult hit." On Metacritic, the film has a weighted average score of 65 out of 100, based on 29 critics, indicating "generally favorable" reviews. Audiences polled by CinemaScore gave the film an average grade of "A−" on an A+ to F scale.

In a review for The New York Times, A. O. Scott wrote that:

What makes Clerks II both winning and (somewhat unexpectedly) moving is its fidelity to the original Clerks ethic of hanging out, talking trash and refusing all worldly ambition. If anything, the sequel is more defiant in its disdain for the rat race, elevating the white-guy-doing-nothing prerogative from a lifestyle choice to a moral principle.

Justin Chang's review at Variety called it a "softer, flabbier and considerably higher-budgeted follow-up to Kevin Smith's 1994 indie sensation that nevertheless packs enough riotous exchanges and pungent sexual obscenities to make its 97 minutes pass by with ease."

At an advance screening for critics, Joel Siegel walked out of the film approximately 40 minutes in, during a scene in which the characters attempt to procure a donkey for sexual purposes. Smith claimed on his website that Siegel "bellowed" the phrase "Time to go! This is the first movie I've walked out on in thirty fucking years!" TV Guide film critic Maitland McDonagh, who said she was sitting next to Siegel, largely confirms Smith's account but insists that Siegel did not curse or "bellow." However, she reports that he left from the farthest possible exit, thereby making sure everyone noticed his departure. On his blog, Smith criticized Siegel for unprofessional conduct. Cinegeek wrote a profanity-laced tirade in which Stephen and Suzie Lackey referred to the critic performing sexual acts on director M. Night Shyamalan in regard to his praise for The Village before having seen it. Smith later confronted Siegel in a live interview on Opie and Anthony; Siegel apologized for cursing and causing a scene, and told Smith that he thinks he is a "fine filmmaker," while still defending his decision to walk out.

British presenter and film critic Jonathan Ross has been largely critical of the film, saying he disliked it even more than the first film; he expressed distaste that the film was voted by viewers of his Film 2006 show into the top ten of the year, in which it ranked sixth. It was voted the third-funniest film of 2006 by IMDb users and the ninth-best reviewed comedy by Rotten Tomatoes.

The film received an eight-minute standing ovation at the 2006 Cannes Film Festival.

== Soundtrack ==
Music from the Motion Picture Clerks II

Soundtrack album to the film Clerks II
- Released: August 22, 2006
- Recorded: Various
- Genre: Various
- Length: 56:41
- Labels: Bulletproof, Fontana North
- Producer: Kevin Smith (exec.)

Music from the Motion Picture Clerks II, the soundtrack to the film, was released on August 22, 2006 by Bulletproof Records. It includes songs from the film, which are of various artists and genres, as well as many soundclips of dialog from the film. One notable exception is that The Smashing Pumpkins' "1979", which was featured in the film, is not included. It has been replaced by All Too Much's "Think Fast", which was not featured in the film.

1. Dialogue: "Anne Frank vs. Helen Keller" – 0:27
2. "(Nothing But) Flowers" – Talking Heads – 5:33
3. Dialogue: "Regret" – 0:28
4. "Welcome Home" – King Diamond – 4:36
5. Dialogue: "Of Parts Enlarged" – 0:17
6. "Neckin' on the Swing" – James L. Venable – 3:49
7. Dialogue: "The First of the Fallen" – 0:55
8. "The Invisible Guests" – King Diamond – 5:04
9. Dialogue: "The Unholiest Act" – 0:52
10. "Goodbye Horses" – Q Lazzarus & Garvey – 6:27
11. Dialogue: "On Knowing Pickles" – 0:17
12. "Raindrops Keep Fallin' on My Head" – B. J. Thomas – 3:02
13. Dialogue: "Twelve Step" – 0:20
14. "ABC" – The Jackson 5 – 2:58
15. Dialogue: "The Perfect Gift" – 0:54
16. "Think Fast" – All Too Much – 3:24
17. Dialogue: "Party Planning" – 0:31
18. "Goin' Away Party" – James L. Venable – 1:44 - This contains segments of the "Clerks" animated series' theme song, also by Venable
19. Dialogue: "I'm Gonna Miss You, Man" – 0:39
20. "Naughty Girls (Need Love Too)" – Samantha Fox – 3:21
21. Dialogue: "Abstinence" – 1:01
22. "Everything" – Alanis Morissette – 4:36
23. Dialogue: "Semantics" – 0:31
24. "Misery" – Soul Asylum – 4:24
25. Dialogue: "Battle of the Mega-Geeks" – 0:31

== Home media ==
The Clerks II DVD was released on November 28, 2006.

The Hollywood Reporter reported that the film opened to #4 in terms of rental and DVD sales, and made approximately $6 million in rentals, or a quarter of the total box office gross of $24.2 million.

Clerks II was released on HD DVD on January 16, 2007. The release featured the film in 1080p high definition on one disc and the same extras as the DVD, also presented in 1080p, on a second disc. After the conclusion of the high definition optical disc format war in February 2008, Clerks II was released on Blu-ray Disc on February 3, 2009 with two additional special features.

== Sequel ==
On February 9, 2017, Smith revealed on Facebook that although a script had been completed, Clerks III had been cancelled as "one of the four leads opted out of the flick". He later revealed that Jeff Anderson was the one who opted out. On October 1, 2019, Smith announced on Instagram that Clerks III was happening and that Anderson agreed to reprise his role as Randal.

It'll be a movie that concludes a saga. It'll be a movie about how you're never too old to completely change your life. It'll be a movie about how a decades-spanning friendship finally confronts the future. It'll be a movie that brings us back to the beginning—a return to the cradle of civilization in the great state of #newjersey. It'll be a movie that stars Jeff and @briancohalloran, with me and Jay in supporting roles. And it'll be a movie called CLERKS III!

Principal photography began on August 2, 2021 in Red Bank, New Jersey. Filming wrapped on August 31, 2021. The film was released on September 13, 2022 in the United States by Lionsgate (whose film studio acquired the catalogue of The Weinstein Company from Spyglass Media Group and now owns Clerks II, although the rights to the first Clerks are with Paramount Pictures through their ownership of the Miramax film library) and Fathom Events.
