= Lisa Spoonauer =

American actress (1972–2017)

Lisa Ann Spoonauer
- Spoonauer in Clerks (1994)
- Born: December 16, 1972; Rahway, New Jersey, U.S.
- Died: May 20, 2017 (aged 44); Jackson Township, New Jersey, U.S.
- Occupations: Actress; restaurant manager; event planner
- Years active: 1994–2001
- Known for: Clerks
- Spouses: Jeff Anderson (m. 1998; div. 1999): Tom Caron (2007–2017; her death)
- Children: 1

Lisa Ann Spoonauer (December 16, 1972 – May 20, 2017) was an American character actress best known for the role of Caitlin Bree in Clerks, which she reprised for an episode of Clerks: The Animated Series.

== Biography ==
Spoonauer was born in Rahway, New Jersey, and raised in Freehold Township. She attended Brookdale Community College, where she was spotted (in an acting class) by Clerks director Kevin Smith, who was having difficulty casting the part of Caitlin. He offered her the role and a script, and she later accepted. Spoonauer's only other film credit is for the Gabe Torres' film Bartender.

== Personal life ==
Spoonauer began dating her Clerks co-star Jeff Anderson in 1993, and they were married for one year from 1998 to 1999. According to the documentary Snowball Effect: The Story of Clerks, Anderson proposed to Spoonauer on the set of Clerks.

Spoonauer married Tom Caron in 2007 and relocated to Jackson Township, New Jersey, where she became a restaurant manager and event planner. Spoonauer had one daughter, Mia, with Caron and a stepson, Tyler, from Caron's previous marriage.

== Death ==
Spoonauer died at age 44 on May 20, 2017, of an accidental overdose of hydromorphone. It was also revealed that she was fighting cancer, anemia, lung disease and immune deficiency, which were all factors in her death.

Her brother Mike, on a fundraising page for Patient Advocate Foundation Inc., related that she had been long suffering from a chronic illness. Spoonauer had travelled to the Mayo Clinic in 2014 for treatment; a Facebook post from that time revealed that she had already been seeing "countless other specialists over the last 7 years".

Clerks co-stars Brian O'Halloran and Marilyn Ghigliotti both shared the news and posted tributes to their personal Facebook accounts on May 23, 2017.

Kevin Smith posted a tribute to Spoonauer via his personal Instagram account and during an episode of his podcast Hollywood Babble-On. Clerks III, released in 2022, is dedicated to Spoonauer.

== Filmography ==
- Clerks (1994) as Caitlin Bree
- Bartender (1997)
- Clerks: The Animated Series (2002)
- Shooting Clerks (2016) (special thanks)
