= Brian O'Halloran =

American actor and producer

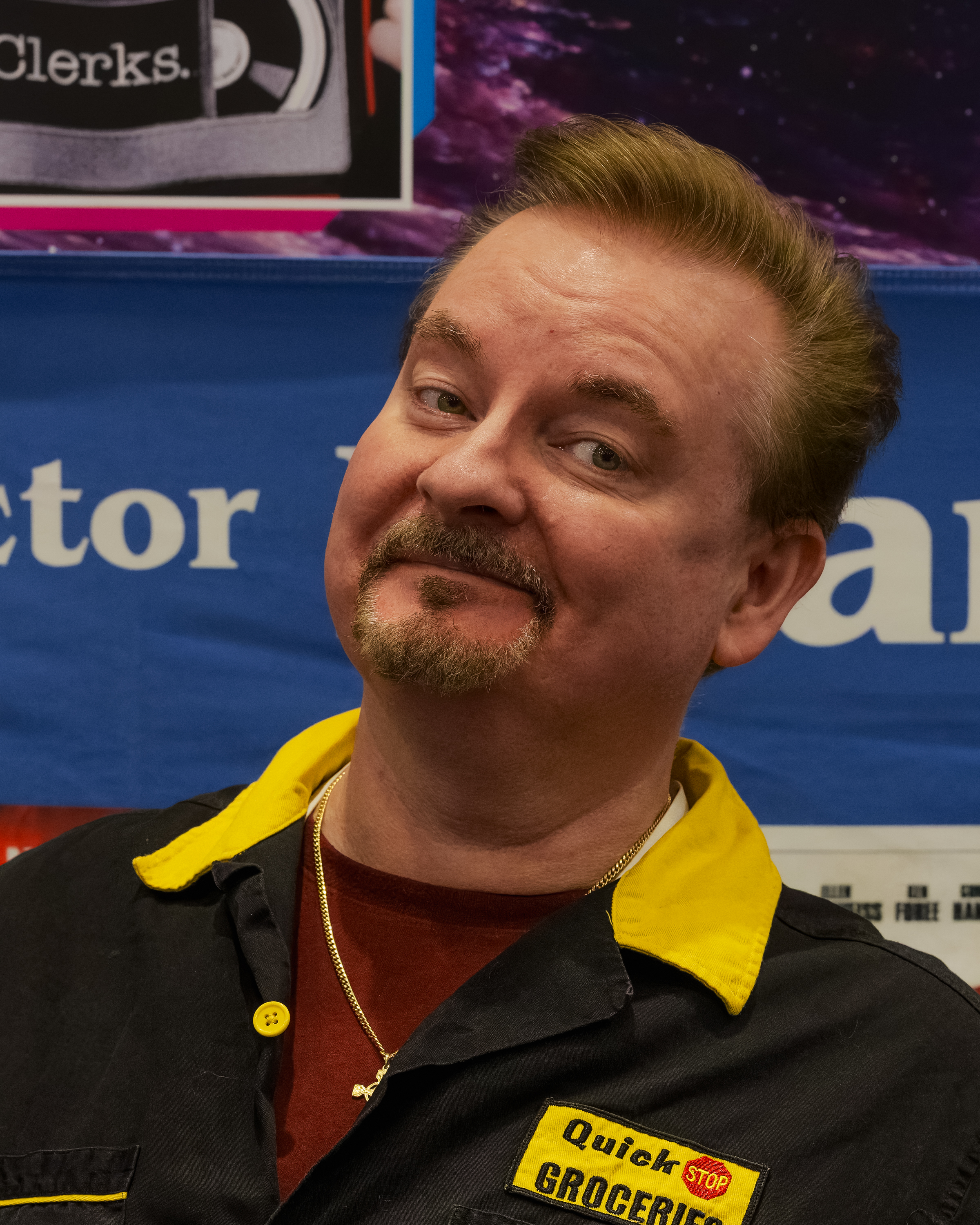
- O'Halloran in 2026
- Born: Brian Christopher O'Halloran; December 20, 1969 (age 56); Manhattan, New York, U.S.
- Occupations: Actor, producer, podcaster
- Years active: 1991–present

Brian Christopher O'Halloran (born December 20, 1969) is an American actor, producer and podcaster best known for playing Dante Hicks in Kevin Smith's debut 1994 film Clerks and its 2006 and 2022 sequels Clerks II and Clerks III. He has also made appearances in most of Smith's View Askewniverse films, either as Dante Hicks or one of Dante's cousins.

== Career ==
O'Halloran's first role was as main character Dante Hicks in Kevin Smith's film Clerks, in 1994. He has returned many times as Dante or another of the Hicks family in films by Smith.

O'Halloran is the lead actor in the 2000 film Vulgar, about a small town clown who is traumatized after he is attacked during one of his performances. Writer/director Bryan Johnson wrote the lead specifically with O'Halloran in mind.

He has worked on theatre productions since high school. He has said on the subject of doing theatre: "Oh, yeah. It's the best training you can do, as an actor. To be in front of a live audience. There's no 'Stop, wait, oh geez, what was that line again?' It just sharpens your reflexes. It sharpens your interaction. And it definitely sharpens your memory because you have to know an entire show from beginning to end."

Since Clerks (1994), O'Halloran has primarily been a stage actor, working with The Boomerang Theatre Company, The New Jersey Repertory Company and The Tri-State Actors Theatre, among others. In 2020, O'Halloran began presenting his own pop culture podcast, The O'HalloRant, on YouTube.

In 2025, O'Halloran appeared as a contestant on the American version of The Floor on FOX. He was eliminated in the first duel of the Semifinal episode. He won $110,000 for holding the most floor across episodes 2-6.

== Personal life ==
A first-generation Irish-American, with parents from Galway and Roscommon, O'Halloran was born in Manhattan, New York City, and lived in Old Bridge Township, New Jersey, from the age of 13. His father died when O'Halloran was 15 years old in 1985. He graduated from Cedar Ridge High School. He has two older brothers.

== Awards and nominations ==
Year	Award	Category	Work	Result
2015	Atlantic City Cinefest	Livesaver Achievement Award	Himself	Won
2018	Hang Onto Your Shorts Film Festival, NJ	Best Actor in a Comedy	Monsters Anonymous	Won
2019	Garden State Film Festival	Spirt of New Jersey	Himself	Won

== Filmography ==
Year	Title	Role	Notes
1994	Clerks	Dante Hicks	
1995	Mallrats	Gill Hicks	
1997	Chasing Amy	Executive Jim Hicks	
1999	Dogma	Grant Hicks	As Brian Christopher O'Halloran
2000	Clerks: The Animated Series	Dante Hicks	Voice
2000	Vulgar	Will Carlson/Flappy/Vulgar	As Brian Christopher O'Halloran
2001	Jay and Silent Bob Strike Back	Dante Hicks	As Brian Christopher O'Halloran
2001	Drop Dead Roses	Shawn	As Brian C. O'Halloran
2002	The Flying Car	Dante Hicks	
2003	Moby Presents: Alien Sex Party	Clerk	
2006	Clerks II	Dante Hicks	
2007	Brutal Massacre	Jay	
2007	The Junior Defenders	Mitch Stone	Originally titled Groupies; its principal photography occurred in February–March 1997
2008	The Happening	Jeep Driver	
2008	Hooking Up	Dr. Jordan	
2011	Pokémon: Zoroark: Master of Illusions	Stadium Announcer	
2011	Pokémon: Black & White	Mr. Garrison	Episode: "Gotta Catch a Roggenrola!"
2012	Cry for Revenge	TBA	
2016	Monsters Anonymous	Dracula	Short
2017	Right Before Your Eyes	John McCann	
2019	Madness in the Method	Self	
2019	Jay and Silent Bob Reboot	Dante Hicks, Grant Hicks	
2021	The Retaliators	Obnoxious Guy at XMas Tree Place	
2022	Clerks III	Dante Hicks	Also executive producer
2023	Shooting Clerks	Elis Heimermann	Also associate producer and special thanks
2024	The 4:30 Movie	Father Hicks	
2025	The Floor	Himself (Contestant)	TV game show
2025	Delco: The Movie	Pastor Joel Powers	
2025	Smiling Friends	Himself	Episode: "Shmaloogles"
TBA	Flea	Scavenger	Post production
