= Chasing Amy =

1997 film by Kevin Smith

- Theatrical release poster
- Directed by: Kevin Smith
- Written by: Kevin Smith
- Produced by: Scott Mosier
- Starring: Ben Affleck; Joey Lauren Adams; Jason Lee; Dwight Ewell; Jason Mewes
- Cinematography: David Klein
- Edited by: Scott Mosier; Kevin Smith
- Music by: David Pirner
- Production company: View Askew Productions
- Distributed by: Miramax Films
- Release dates: January 24, 1997 (Sundance); April 4, 1997
- Running time: 113 minutes
- Country: United States
- Language: English
- Budget: $250,000
- Box office: $12 million

Chasing Amy is a 1997 American romantic comedy-drama film written and directed by Kevin Smith and starring Ben Affleck, Joey Lauren Adams and Jason Lee. The third film in Smith's View Askewniverse series, the film is about a male comic artist (Affleck) who falls in love with a lesbian (Adams), to the displeasure of his best friend (Lee).

The film was inspired by a brief scene from an early film by a friend of Smith's. In Guinevere Turner's Go Fish, one of the lesbian characters imagines her friends passing judgment on her for "selling out" by sleeping with a man. Smith was dating Adams at the time he was writing the script, which was also partly inspired by her.

Chasing Amy premiered at the Sundance Film Festival on January 24, 1997 before being released by Miramax Films on April 4, 1997. The film received mostly positive reviews which praised the humor, the performances and Kevin Smith's direction, while grossing $12 million on a $250,000 budget. The film won two awards at the 1998 Independent Spirit Awards (Best Screenplay for Smith and Best Supporting Actor for Lee). Characters from the film would go on to appear in later Askewniverse films Jay and Silent Bob Strike Back (2001) and Jay and Silent Bob Reboot (2019), direct spin-offs of Chasing Amy, with Affleck, Lee, Adams and Dwight Ewell reprising their roles in cameo appearances; Smith described the characters' roles in Jay and Silent Bob Reboot as being an "eight-page sequel" to Chasing Amy.

== Plot ==
While promoting their comic Bluntman and Chronic at a comic book convention in the Manhattan borough of New York City, comic book artists and lifelong best friends Holden McNeil and Banky Edwards meet Alyssa Jones. A struggling writer working on her own comic Idiosyncratic Routine, Alyssa is friends with Hooper, an African-American activist writer who militantly masks his flamboyantly gay personality to promote his comic White-Hating Coon. Immediately attracted to her, Holden soon discovers her lesbianism while at an East Village bar called the Meow Mix.

Holden and Alyssa soon bond, as they grew up in the same area of New Jersey, with Holden and Banky being natives of Highlands and Alyssa being a native of Middletown. This upsets the homophobic Banky, who resents Alyssa for intervening in their affairs. The duo's business partnership also suffers, as they had almost signed a lucrative deal to adapt Bluntman and Chronic into an animated television series, and Banky feels that Holden has abandoned their project.

Unable to conceal his feelings any longer, Holden eventually confesses his love to Alyssa. She is initially angry and upset with him, but they later reconcile and begin a romantic relationship that night, which worsens things with Banky when he encounters them sleeping on his couch in the duo's shared studio Bank-Hold-Up in Red Bank the next morning. Banky encounters an old friend of his, who grew up with Alyssa and tells him she participated in a ménage à trois with two boys back in high school, which earned her the nickname "Finger Cuffs". Banky relays the story to Holden, who becomes deeply disturbed by the revelation, having believed himself to be the first man Alyssa had ever slept with.

Believing that Banky is jealously in love with Holden, disguising his true feelings with macho sexual banter, Hooper advises Holden to be honest and truthful and ask Alyssa about her past. The following night at a hockey game, Holden confronts her and clumsily attempts to bait her into confessing, which she eventually does, and she storms out of the arena. In the parking lot, she angrily confirms the threesome but defends her past sexual experiences, wanting to continue their relationship. Holden leaves feeling unsure.

Later, Holden meets Jay and Silent Bob, the inspirations for the characters Bluntman and Chronic, for lunch at a local diner. He hands them their monthly residual pay for book sales and discusses his troubles regarding Alyssa. The normally-mute Bob reveals that a couple of years earlier, he had a girlfriend named Amy in a relationship mirroring Holden's. Although he loved her, his insecurities about her past promiscuity caused him to break up with her. He regretted it and has since spent a long time "chasing Amy".

Inspired by Bob's story, Holden devises a plan to fix both his relationship with Alyssa and his fractured friendship with Banky. He invites them over and tells Alyssa that he would like to get over her past and remain her boyfriend while telling Banky that he realizes that he is in love with him, kissing him passionately to prove it. He proposes a threesome, which he believes would be an intimate act tying them together, as he would have gone through an experience on par with hers, and it would be all the more powerful, because he would have shared it with her, while also helping Banky accept his sexuality and getting past his issues with them being a couple.

The initially shocked Banky agrees to participate, but is relieved when Alyssa declines. Holden is hurt and confused because he knows Alyssa has done similar things in the past, and thus thought it wouldn't be outside of her comfort zone. He feels that her rejection indicates that he matters to her less than those she had previously slept with, since she is unwilling to do with him something she was willing to do with them, even though with him it would be an act of intimacy, not just sex. Alyssa, however, while understanding that Holden genuinely believes that it would broaden his horizons and solve all the problems between the three of them, has already gone through similar experiences on her own, and is now past that phase, and thus unable to accompany him on a similar journey. At the same time, she fears that it would negatively impact the dynamic between Holden, Banky and herself. She also wants a completely monogamous relationship, and is unwilling to share Holden with anyone else, feeling hurt that he doesn't feel the same way. Ultimately, she doesn't think that Holden's plan would actually heal the relationship between the three of them, and ends things with him. Alyssa and Banky both silently depart.

One year later, at a convention, Banky, while promoting his own comic Baby Dave, reveals to a fan that he now owns the publishing and creative rights to Bluntman and Chronic, having dissolved his partnership with Holden. Holden silently congratulates Banky on the success of Baby Dave, and Banky gestures him over to a booth hosted by Alyssa, encouraging him to speak to her. During their brief emotional conversation, Holden gives her a copy of Chasing Amy, his new comic based on their failed relationship, and asks her to contact him if she has anything to say about it. After he departs, Alyssa's new girlfriend arrives and asks about him. Smiling and teary-eyed, Alyssa feigns indifference, casually moves his comic aside, and dismissively replies, "Oh, just some guy I knew."

== Cast ==
- Ben Affleck as Holden McNeil
- Joey Lauren Adams as Alyssa Jones
- Jason Lee as Banky Edwards
- Dwight Ewell as Hooper
- Jason Mewes as Jay
- Kevin Smith as Silent Bob
- Ethan Suplee as Fan
- Scott Mosier as Collector
- Casey Affleck as Little Kid
- Brian O'Halloran as Exec. #1
- Matt Damon as Exec. #2
- Carmen Llywelyn (credited as Carmen Lee) as Kim
- Guinevere Turner as Singer
- Joe Quesada (uncredited) as himself
- Michael Allred (uncredited) as himself

== Production ==
Kevin Smith has said over the years that Chasing Amy was inspired by his brother being gay, his relationship with Joey Lauren Adams, whom he was dating during the making of the film, and a crush his producing partner Scott Mosier had on lesbian filmmaker Guinevere Turner. Turner met Mosier and Smith at the 1994 Sundance Film Festival where their respective films, Go Fish and Clerks, had premiered. After the festival, Mosier and Turner kept in touch, with Mosier developing unrequited feelings for Turner. Smith told Mosier to channel his heartbreak into a movie about a guy who falls in love with a lesbian, but the filmmakers felt it was too lean a story, so Smith added his own experiences into the character of Holden. Smith wrote, "The character of Holden is the closest to me I've ever written (casting Ben was aesthetically wishful thinking perhaps)." Smith, who said he "didn't really know that much about gay culture, and specifically lesbian culture", had Turner look at drafts of the script for her input. Turner helped find the location for the bar scenes, which were shot at the since-closed Meow Mix in downtown Manhattan.

Miramax Films initially offered Smith a $2 million budget on the condition that he cast David Schwimmer, Drew Barrymore, and Jon Stewart as the leads. Smith rejected this offer in favor of a $250,000 budget with a cast of his choosing.

== Release ==
The film premiered at the Sundance Film Festival on January 24, 1997.

On a budget of $250,000, the film grossed a total of $12,021,272 in theaters. Chasing Amy played at three locations and earned $52,446 upon its opening weekend in the United States. The following week, the film was expanded to a further 22 theaters where it grossed $302,406. During the 18–20 April 1997 weekend, Chasing Amy was screened at a further 494 locations, where it earned $1,642,402 and moved into the Top 10.

== Reception ==
Chasing Amy received positive reviews from critics. Review aggregation website Rotten Tomatoes reports an approval rating of 87% based on reviews from 87 critics, with a rating average of 7.30/10. According to the site's summary of the critical consensus, “Although Chasing Amy's depiction of queer sexuality is frustratingly clumsy, it handles an array of thorny themes with a mixture of sensitivity, raw honesty, and writer-director Kevin Smith's signature raunchy humor." On Metacritic, the film has a weighted average score of 71 out of 100 based on 28 reviews. Audiences polled by Cinemascore gave the film a grade of "A−".

Roger Ebert of the Chicago Sun-Times gave the film three-and-a-half out of four stars, saying:

While the surface of his film sparkles with sharp, ironic dialogue, deeper issues are forming, and Chasing Amy develops into a film of touching insights. Most romantic comedies place phony obstacles in the way of true love, but Smith knows that at some level there's nothing funny about being in love: It's a dead serious business, in which your entire being is at risk.

Ebert believed the film was an improvement over Smith's previous effort Mallrats and he added that Adams was a discovery.

Charles Taylor, writing for Salon, quipped "Chasing Amy isn't going to single-handedly save romantic comedy, but Smith (Clerks) has made the only romantic comedy in quite a while that acknowledges, even celebrates, the fact that love and sex are emotional anarchy." Writing in Time Out New York, Andrew Johnston observed: "Chasing Amy, Kevin Smith's third feature, does to romantic comedy what Stan Lee and Steve Ditko's Spider-Man did to superhero comics in the '60s: It makes a tired genre newly relevant by giving its characters motivations and problems that seem real."

Quentin Tarantino considered Chasing Amy his favorite movie of 1997.

=== Analysis ===
In the book Sexual Fluidity: Understanding Women's Love and Desire, Lisa M. Diamond cites the film as a notable example of female sexual fluidity in popular culture, writing that Chasing Amy "depicts a lesbian becoming involved with a man, contrary to the more widespread depictions of heterosexual women becoming involved in same-sex relationships."

Though the film has been praised as ahead of its time by some critics in its representation of sexual fluidity and the concept of the bromance, it also received criticism, particularly for its implication that a lesbian can go straight, even if just temporarily, as soon as she meets the right guy. The film was criticized by Judith Kegan Gardiner in the book Masculinity Studies and Feminist Theory, describing Chasing Amy as representative of a "fairly repulsive genre of films" that feature a "heterosexual conversion narrative" that is "set in motion by the desire of a heterosexual person for a seemingly unattainable gay person." The scene where Alyssa is shamed by her gay friends when they discover she is dating a man also received criticism from the lesbian community.

On the film's 20th anniversary, Smith said, "For anyone who watches the movie now and goes, like, 'Ew, these sexual politics are ... not very subtle', you've gotta remember: It was made by a 26-year-old, 27-year-old guy, who really didn't know anything and was learning in that moment. As much as it's a movie that's closely identified with the gay community, by virtue of the fact that the main character was gay, I really never think about it as such ... To me, it was about a boy who grows up to become a man but loses everything in the process — very bittersweet."

In 2023, queer filmmaker Sav Rodgers released the documentary Chasing Chasing Amy, which discusses the impact the film had on his life.

=== Accolades ===
Award	Date of ceremony	Category	Recipients	Result
British Independent Film Awards	October 29, 1998	Best Foreign Independent Film	Chasing Amy	Nominated
Chicago Film Critics Association	March 1, 1998	Most Promising Actress	Joey Lauren Adams	Won
Golden Globe Award	January 18, 1998	Best Actress in a Motion Picture Musical or Comedy	Joey Lauren Adams	Nominated
Independent Spirit Awards	March 21, 1998	Best Film	Chasing Amy	Nominated
Independent Spirit Awards	March 21, 1998	Best Screenplay	Kevin Smith	Won
Independent Spirit Awards	March 21, 1998	Best Supporting Actor	Jason Lee	Won
Las Vegas Film Critics Society	January 1998	Most Promising Actress	Joey Lauren Adams	Won
Los Angeles Film Critics Association	January 15, 1996	Best Screenplay	Kevin Smith	Nominated
MTV Movie Awards	May 30, 1998	Best Breakthrough Performance	Joey Lauren Adams	Nominated
MTV Movie Awards	May 30, 1998	Best Kiss	Joey Lauren Adams and Carmen Llywelyn	Nominated
National Board of Review of Motion Pictures	December 8, 1998	Special Recognition for Excellence in Filmmaking	Chasing Amy	Won

== Home media ==
Chasing Amy was released by the Criterion Collection, first on Laserdisc in 1997, then on DVD in 2000. It includes audio commentary from cast and crew, deleted scenes, outtakes, and a theatrical trailer. The DVD adds an introduction from Kevin Smith, apologizing for saying "fuck DVD" in the commentary. Later reissues by Lionsgate and Paramount are repressings of the Criterion edition.

Chasing Amy was released on Blu-Ray on November 17, 2009. This release includes a new commentary track, a Q&A with the cast recorded at Vulgarthon 2005, a conversation between Kevin Smith and Joey Lauren Adams, and a feature-length documentary titled "Tracing Amy" that details the making of the film and its aftermath.

In 2020, ViacomCBS (now known as Paramount Skydance) bought a 49% stake in Miramax (which was taken over by Qatari company beIN in 2016), with this deal giving Paramount worldwide distribution rights to Chasing Amy and the rest of the Miramax catalog. Paramount subsequently reissued the film on DVD and Blu-Ray in 2021, and made it available on their subscription streaming service Paramount+. It was also made available on Paramount's free streaming service Pluto TV.

== Novel ==
In Japan, the screenplay of Chasing Amy was adapted into a novel by Kenichi Eguchi and published by Aoyama Publishing. The unique concept of the book is that it is roughly half-novel, half-manga, with Moyoko Anno providing the art for the comic book pages. In an episode of SModcast, Smith revealed that while he was thrilled to have a manga based on his film, he was shocked when he read the novelization, as the characters' sexual histories, which are just mentioned in conversation in the film, are depicted in the novel's manga illustrations as sexually graphic flashbacks.

Smith had the original screenplay published along with his Clerks script from Miramax Books.

== Soundtrack ==
The film had no soundtrack album released; however, many songs appear in the movie, including "Alive,"; the song written and performed by Joey Lauren Adams in character as Alyssa, cover of The Cars' "Let's Go" performed by Ernie Isley, "The Impression That I Get" by The Mighty Mighty Bosstones, "Run's House" by Run-DMC and other songs by artists such as Public Enemy, The Hang Ups, Gwen Guthrie and Liz Phair.

Two songs by the band Soul Asylum are featured in the film: "Lucky One" and "We 3". The band had previously contributed the song Can't Even Tell to the soundtrack of Smith's 1994 debut film Clerks. Frontman Dave Pirner composed the incidental music for the film along with the film's theme song, "Tube of Wonderful," which plays over the opening credits. The song reappears in Smith's 2001 film Jay and Silent Bob Strike Back, as well as its 2019 reboot Jay and Silent Bob Reboot, both times introducing the character Holden McNeil.

The music video for the song "Have You Seen Mary", performed by the band Sponge, features several scenes of the film. In Chasing Amy, the song is played in the scene while Holden and Hooper are at Jack's Music Shoppe.

== Cultural references ==
In a scene originally written for Mallrats, several principal characters share memories of sexual escapades gone awry. This scene reveals the character's own emotional "sex scars" and was purposefully created—down to the style of dialogue and set dressing—to mirror a scene from Steven Spielberg's Jaws in which Quint and Hooper share the physical scars they've both earned from encounters with sharks. However, in this film it's used with Alyssa and Banky.
