= Mallrats =

1995 film by Kevin Smith

- Theatrical release poster by Drew Struzan
- Directed by: Kevin Smith
- Written by: Kevin Smith
- Produced by: James Jacks; Sean Daniel; Scott Mosier
- Starring: Shannen Doherty; Jeremy London; Jason Lee; Claire Forlani; Priscilla Barnes; Michael Rooker
- Cinematography: David Klein
- Edited by: Paul Dixon
- Music by: Ira Newborn
- Production companies: Alphaville Films; View Askew Productions
- Distributed by: Gramercy Pictures
- Release dates: October 19, 1995 (Cineplex Odeon Universal City Cinemas); October 20, 1995 (United States)
- Running time: 94 minutes
- Country: United States
- Language: English
- Budget: $6.1 million
- Box office: $2.1 million

Mallrats is a 1995 American buddy comedy film written and directed by Kevin Smith. The film stars Shannen Doherty, Jeremy London, Jason Lee, Claire Forlani, Priscilla Barnes, and Michael Rooker. It is the second film in the View Askewniverse. The film follows two best friends as they retreat to a local mall after being dumped by their girlfriends on the same day.

Mallrats had its premiere at the Cineplex Odeon Universal City Cinemas in Universal City, California on October 19, 1995, and was released in the United States on October 20 by Gramercy Pictures. The film received mixed reviews from critics and grossed $2.1 million against a $6.1 million budget. It has since garnered a cult following.

== Plot ==
College student T.S. Quint is preparing for a trip to Universal Studios Florida in Orlando with Brandi Svenning, during which he plans to propose to her; however, Brandi tells him she cannot go due to having volunteered to fill in as a contestant on Truth or Date, her father's dating game show, because the original contestant had died from an embolism bursting in her brain while swimming 700 laps at the local Y.M.C.A. following T.S.'s comment regarding her weight. Brandi and T.S. argue over his responsibility and the two break up. T.S. turns to his best friend Brodie Bruce, who has been dumped by his girlfriend Rene, and Brodie suggests the two might find comfort at the local mall.

Brodie and T.S. discover Truth or Date is being filmed at the same mall, through their friend Willam, who throughout the film tries to see a sailboat in a Magic Eye poster. The two ask local slackers Jay and Silent Bob to destroy the show's stage, a task for which they devise elaborate but ultimately unsuccessful plans. Brodie and T.S. run into Tricia Jones, a 15-year-old senior who is writing a book on the sex drive of men ages 14–30, for which she has sex with various men as research and films every encounter. She then reveals that the previous night she had sex with Shannon Hamilton, a 25-year-old clothing-store manager who hates Brodie because of his "lack of a shopping agenda".

Brodie then learns that Rene has begun a relationship with Shannon. Brodie confronts Rene to find out more about the relationship, and the two have sex in an elevator. Brodie is later accosted and attacked by Shannon, who intends to have anal sex with Rene. As a result of this incident, Jay and Silent Bob assault the mall's Easter Bunny, under the incorrect assumption that he attacked Brodie.

Brandi's father Jared has Brodie and T.S. arrested on false charges of drug possession at the mall. Jay and Silent Bob are able to rescue Brodie and T.S., and they hide out at a local flea market. There, they encounter Ivannah, a topless fortune teller with three nipples, who offers advice on their relationship problems. While Brodie is visibly uncomfortable with the situation, T.S. pays close attention to Ivannah's advice and decides to win Brandi back. Eventually, the two return to the mall.

Before the show begins, Brodie meets famed Marvel legend Stan Lee, who gives him advice on romance. After this, Brodie requests that his friend Tricia Jones retrieve footage of her having sex with Shannon. Meanwhile, T.S. also persuades Jay to get two of the game show contestants stoned, which allows him and Brodie to replace them on Truth or Date.

During the show, Brandi recognizes the voices of Brodie and T.S., leading to an on-air argument between them. Brodie eventually intervenes, explaining that T.S. has spent the entire day pining for Brandi. Subsequently, T.S. proposes to Brandi, who accepts. After the show concludes and as the police arrive to arrest T.S. and Brodie, Silent Bob broadcasts a sex tape featuring Shannon and Tricia. This leads to Shannon's arrest for statutory rape. In the extended cut, Jared is arrested for 19 FCC violations and broadcasting lewd or indecent images in a public forum. Consequently, Brodie and Rene rekindle their relationship.

The conclusion reveals that T.S. marries Brandi at Universal Studios while on a Jaws attraction, Tricia's book is a bestseller, Shannon is imprisoned (and subsequently raped), Willam eventually does see the sailboat, Brodie becomes the host of The Tonight Show (with Rene as his bandleader), and that Jay and Silent Bob get an orangutan named Susanne.

== Cast ==
- Shannen Doherty as Rene Mosier
- Jeremy London as T.S. Quint
- Jason Lee as Brodie Bruce
- Claire Forlani as Brandi Svenning
- Priscilla Barnes as Miss Ivannah
- Michael Rooker as Jared Svenning
- Ben Affleck as Shannon Hamilton
- Joey Lauren Adams as Gwen Turner
- Renee Humphrey as Tricia Jones
- Jason Mewes as Jay
- Kevin Smith as Silent Bob
- Ethan Suplee as Willam
- Stan Lee as himself
- Elizabeth Ashley (Extended edition only) as Governor Dalton
- Sven-Ole Thorsen as LaFours
- Scott Mosier as Roddy
- Walt Flanagan as Walt "Fanboy" Grover
- Bryan Johnson as Steve-Dave Pulasti
- Brian O'Halloran as Gill Hicks, Suitor #3
- Art James as Bob Summers, host of Truth or Date

== Production ==
After the success of the independent hit Clerks, writer/director Kevin Smith and his best friend/producer Scott Mosier began to make their second film. After a screening of Clerks, producer James Jacks approached them to do another film for Universal Studios. Smith soon finished the script for Mallrats, and casting began.

Jeremy London, an actor with a TV series and a few films to his credit, was cast as T.S.; Henry Thomas was the finalist of the role. Shannen Doherty was the most famous cast member after her appearances in several films and the hit TV show Beverly Hills, 90210. Jason Lee was cast with no prior acting experience; before the film, Lee was a professional skateboarder, and Adam Sandler and Steve Zahn were the finalists for the role of Brodie Bruce. Ben Affleck, who was a relative unknown at the time, was cast as Shannon Hamilton. Joey Lauren Adams was cast as Gwen Turner; she later dated Smith, and during that time, he wrote the main character in Chasing Amy for her. Ethan Suplee was cast as Willam Black. Scott Mosier was supposed to reprise the role, but Smith and the film's producers were so impressed with Suplee that they cast him, instead. The most troublesome role to cast was Jay, as Universal did not want Jason Mewes to have the role, despite playing him in Clerks and the character being based on him. Mewes had to audition for the part against actors Seth Green and Breckin Meyer. Smith also said that he wrote the role of Jared Svenning for William Atherton, but Atherton did not want to be typecast.

Smith wanted to shoot the film in Seaview Square Mall in Ocean Township, New Jersey; however, due to lower production costs, it was filmed at Eden Prairie Center mall in Eden Prairie, Minnesota instead.

== Reception ==
The film grossed $400,000 on its Friday opening on 800 screens, $1.2 million on its opening weekend, and grossed an overall total of $2,122,561 at the box office.

Mallrats was the subject of much critical derision when it was released, with many critics comparing it unfavorably to Smith's first film, Clerks. In his negative review of the film, critic Roger Ebert gave the film 1 1/2 stars out of 4 and said "Before Mallrats was released, I chaired a panel that Smith participated in and Kevin Smith cheerfully said he'd be happy to do whatever the studios wanted, if they'd pay for his films. At the time, I thought he was joking." On their television program Siskel & Ebert, Ebert's colleague Gene Siskel said, "I sat stonefaced throughout Mallrats, not laughing once. I couldn't believe it was the same talent involved that made Clerks." He deemed the jokes "stale and recycled" and recommended moviegoers rent Clerks instead of seeing Mallrats.

On review aggregator Rotten Tomatoes, the film has an approval rating of 58% based on 48 reviews, with an average rating of 5.6/10. The website's critical consensus reads, "Mallrats colorfully expands the View Askewniverse, even if its snootchie has lost a few of the bootchies boasted by its beloved predecessor." On Metacritic, the film received a score of 41 based on 18 reviews, indicating "mixed or average reviews".

== Home media ==
In 1996, MCA/Universal Home Video released the movie on VHS and Laserdisc (the latter in widescreen format).

A DVD was released in 1999 including 1.85:1 Anamorphic widescreen picture & 5.1 Dolby surround sound (both of which the movie was in for the Laserdisc release). Bonus features include:

- Audio commentary with director Kevin Smith, cast members Ben Affleck, Jason Lee, and Jason Mewes, and producers Scott Mosier & Vincent Pereira
- Deleted scenes
- Featurette – View Askew's Look Back at Mallrats
- Music video – Build Me Up Buttercup by The Goops (directed by Kevin Smith)
- Cast and Filmmaker Bios
- Theatrical trailer

In 2005, a 10th anniversary double-sided DVD was released, containing the original version of the film, features from the previous DVD release, and an all new extended cut of the movie.

The film was released on Blu-ray in 2014 and it used digital noise reduction and edge enhancement (as part of Universal's 1990's Best of the Decade collection); the menus were replaced with Universal-mandated menus, the Focus Features logo replaced the Universal logo at the start of the film, and some copies also included a code for a digital streaming version to be redeemed at Universal's online UltraViolet service, and iTunes.

In 2020, Arrow Video released a 25th anniversary Blu-Ray that contains a third "television cut" of the film, with many scenes altered and re-dubbed to remove profanity.

=== Extended cut ===
The extended cut contains over 30 minutes of additional footage and subplots. They include:

- An alternate opening scene, in which Mr. Svenning hosts a Ball for the Governor of New Jersey (played by Elizabeth Ashley). In this scene, T.S. (dressed as a colonial musketeer) accidentally gets his musket tangled up in Brandi's hair, then accidentally shoots at the Governor on the roof of a school, which ends up costing Mr. Svenning his reputation as well as a big pay raise. This explains the reason why Svenning shows an intense dislike for T.S. and why Brandi is so intent on breaking up with him. This scene also makes no mention of Julie Dwyer's death, as the theatrical cut did. (That cut subplot was referenced in the final cut of the movie, where the TV execs mention to Svenning that they do not want a repeat of the Governor's Ball.)
- Multiple lines throughout the movie are restored, related to T.S.'s "attempted assassination" of the governor. Many of these have wildly different reasons for having seen T.S. on the news, such as Shannon's claim that he had tried to kidnap the President's daughter.
- An extended sequence at Brodie's house, where T.S. is hounded by the media as a result of his actions at the Governor's Ball, including several TV movie offers.
- Included scenes where T.S. also makes it known to Brandi that he proposed to marry her.
- A scene in which Brodie and T.S. arrive outside of Mr. Svenning's home, so T.S. can try and reconcile, and during the confusion, thanks to a news crew chasing T.S., then interviewing Brodie (who then implies that Mr. Svenning and Brandi take part in Satanic rituals), the news crew records footage of Svenning doing martial arts in a bath-towel. (Some of the footage of Mr. Svenning was re-edited in the theatrical release into the new intro.)
- A shot that shows the Quick Stop from Clerks.
- A new subplot of Brodie showing intentions of wanting to be on television, which explains his surprised look during his appearance on Truth or Date.
- An extended arrest scene in which LaFours wants to put Brodie and T.S. into jail for an extended period of time, rather than "overnight" when the pair were initially arrested.
- An extended fight scene between Brodie and Shannon Hamilton
- A scene after Truth or Date in which Mr. Svenning demands to have T.S. and Brodie arrested, but instead he is the one who is arrested. It turns out that since Svenning was the producer of the show, he faces multiple FCC fines for Brodie's antics.
- An extended "Where are they now?" ending sequence, in which Mr. Svenning is shown at his job at the network as a janitor (along with his production assistant, still wearing his headset), and Shannon Hamilton is shown screaming after his rape in prison.
- A scene that showed Tricia flirting and having sex with LaFours in order to distract him from catching Jay and Silent Bob.

As explained by Kevin Smith in the introduction, most of the scenes were reworked because of the test audience's negative reaction. Some of the dialogue had been re-dubbed in the theatrical release, but is restored in this version; extended scenes have notable jump cuts.

== Soundtrack ==
Mallrats

Soundtrack album to the film Mallrats
- Released: October 17, 1995
- Recorded: Various
- Genres: Indie rock, pop punk
- Length: 47:18
- Label: MCA
- Producers: Kevin Smith (exec.); Scott Mosier (exec.); James Jacks (exec.); Sean Daniel (exec.)

The soundtrack album was released in October 1995. It features mainly alternative rock from the 90s along with dialogue from the film. The ordering of the songs on the soundtrack album is not the order they appear as in the film. For example, Squirtgun's "Social" opens the film, while Weezer's "Susanne" ends the film, with Wax's "Mallrats" playing over the end credits. The song "Boogie Shoes" by KC and the Sunshine Band makes an appearance, when Brodie and T.S. drive to the flea market. However, it was excluded from the soundtrack album. A music video for The Goops' version of "Build Me Up Buttercup" was directed by Smith and featured both Smith and Mewes.

No.	Title	Contributing artist	Length
1.	"Love and Sharks" (Dialogue)	Jason Lee and Jeremy London	0:22
2.	"Bubbles"	Bush	3:03
3.	"Susanne"	Weezer	2:44
4.	"Freeing One's Mind" (Dialogue)	Priscilla Barnes, Jason Lee, Jeremy London	0:10
5.	"Seventeen"	Sponge	2:42
6.	"Kryptonite Condoms" (Dialogue)	Jason Lee and Jeremy London	0:37
7.	"Line Up"	Elastica	3:15
8.	"Mission Impossible #1" (Dialogue)	Jason Mewes	0:19
9.	"Mallrats"	Wax	2:39
10.	"Taken with a Grain of Salt" (Dialogue)	Shannen Doherty	0:30
11.	"Broken"	Belly	4:02
12.	"Cruise Your New Baby Fly Self"	Girls Against Boys	3:11
13.	"A Very Uncomfortable Place" (Dialogue)	Jason Mewes, Jason Lee, Jeremy London, Joey Lauren Adams	0:53
14.	"Guilty"	All	3:19
15.	"That Ski Trip" (Dialogue)	Joey Lauren Adams, Jason Lee, Jeremy London	0:16
16.	"Web in Front"	Archers of Loaf	2:03
17.	"Hated It"	Thrush Hermit	3:49
18.	"Post Coital Techno Boogie" (Dialogue)	Jason Lee, Shannen Doherty	0:34
19.	"Build Me Up Buttercup"	The Goops	2:38
20.	"Cousin Walter" (Dialogue)	Jason Lee, Brian O'Halloran	0:45
21.	"Social"	Squirtgun	3:35
22.	"Mission Impossible #2" (Dialogue)	Jason Mewes	0:19
23.	"Smoke Two Joints"	Sublime	2:38
24.	"Stoned"	Silverchair	2:46
25.	"Last Words" (Dialogue)	Jason Mewes	0:09

== Sequel ==
On March 13, 2015, Smith confirmed that Mallrats 2 was being written and was slated to begin shooting in summer 2016. In April 2015, Smith announced that Mallrats 2 would be his next film, instead of Clerks III as originally intended, and would begin filming in 2015. From April 2015 to July 2016, Smith made a series of announcements regarding the proposed sequel, some regarding casting and some announcing delays in production. During this time, the planned film became a planned 10-episode television miniseries.

In February 2017, Smith announced that pitches to six different networks resulted in no one willing to produce the TV series, but expressed his hope that interest in the series would spike after the release of the film Jay and Silent Bob Reboot.

In January 2020, Smith announced that development on a Mallrats sequel film had started up again, under a new title, Twilight of the Mallrats. On April 24, Smith stated that he had completed the first draft of the script and that the original cast would return. On May 12, 2020, Smith revealed that Aparna Brielle, who played Jihad in Jay and Silent Bob Reboot, had been set to lead the film as Banner, the daughter of Brodie, and that Doherty would return to reprise her role of Rene Mosier.

Doherty died on July 13, 2024. A few months later, however, Smith suggested that the sequel could still be made, reframed as a tribute to Doherty, with her friend Sarah Michelle Gellar—who had auditioned for a role in the original Mallrats—"step[ping] in for" her. In an Instagram comment, Gellar expressed support for the idea.
