= List of View Askewniverse characters =

This is a list of major and recurring characters in Kevin Smith's fictional universe known as the View Askewniverse.

== Clerks (1994) ==
=== Dante Hicks ===
Dante Hicks
- First appearance: Clerks (1994)
- Last appearance: Clerks III (2022)
- Created by: Kevin Smith
- Portrayed by: Brian O'Halloran

In-universe information
- Gender: Male
- Occupation: Quick Stop store clerk/owner Mooby's restaurant clerk (Clerks II)
- Family: Donald Hicks (father); Mrs. Hicks (mother); Gill Hicks (possible relative)
- Spouse: Becky Hicks née Scott (Clerks II)
- Significant others: Caitlin Bree (ex-girlfriend); Julie Dwyer (ex-girlfriend; deceased); Veronica Loughran (ex-girlfriend); Emma Bunting (ex-fiancee); Becky Scott (Wife; deceased)
- Relatives: Grant Hicks (cousin); Jim Hicks (cousin); Gill Hicks (cousin); Mr. Scott (father-in-law); Mrs. Scott (mother-in-law)

Dante Hicks, played by Brian O'Halloran, is 22 (33 in Clerks II, 49 in Clerks III), works at the Quick Stop Market in Leonardo, New Jersey, and still lives with his parents. He feels that because he runs the store, he is responsible and successful in life, and yet, he is a push-over who often agrees to work when he doesn't have to (hence his catch phrase, "I'm not even supposed to be here today!"). He frequently gets into debates ranging from philosophy to Star Wars with his best friend, fellow clerk Randal Graves, who works at the adjacent RST Video Store.

Dante is laid-back, personable, articulate, and logical (especially when compared with his best friend Randal), and is easily angered by Randal's actions or behavior, particularly when Randal's actions lead to negative consequences. For example, Dante often scolds Randal for disrespecting customers, while Randal often tries to defend his actions.

The film centers on the surreal events of a day at the Quick Stop that Dante must deal with. Among other problems, Dante becomes the target of an anti-smoking mob who pelt him with cigarettes, and he is issued a summons and fined for selling cigarettes to a four-year-old, a crime Randal had in fact accidentally committed. In addition, he is continually stalked by Jay and Silent Bob (Jason Mewes and Kevin Smith), two drug dealers who loiter in front of the store all day and often like to go inside and steal. A running gag throughout the film is the scent of shoe polish on him, as he uses some to write a makeshift open sign to hang over the stuck window shutters of the store.

The film also deals with Dante's stressful romantic relationships. He has difficulty dealing with his girlfriend Veronica, especially her extensive history of performing fellatio (on 37 different men, including him) — even though she seems to genuinely love him, going so far as to bring him lasagna at work and help him fix a tire. At the same time, Dante is besotted with ex-girlfriend Caitlin Bree and seems intent on rekindling that relationship. In the end, Dante ends up with neither woman; Randal ends the relationship by telling Veronica that Dante never got over Caitlin, and Caitlin is hospitalized after accidentally having sex in a dark bathroom with a corpse, whom she had believed to be Dante.

After an argument with Veronica, Dante gets into a physical altercation with Randal, and he rants about his anxieties including the loss of his girlfriend and Caitlin, as well as his overall miserable life. He is left speechless when Randal explodes at him, accusing him of blaming everyone else and not taking responsibility for his-own lack of initiative. The two reconcile and clean up the Quick Stop. In the final scene, he tells Randal that he is going to try and work things out with Veronica. It is implied that he will try to find direction in his life.

In the film's original ending, after Randal leaves the Quick Stop to go home, a customer comes in, with Dante telling him that the store is closed. The customer responds by pulling out a gun and killing Dante before taking the money from the cash register and leaving. The scene is meant to reference Dante and Randal's earlier discussion; that "'Empire' was a better film, because it ended on such a down-note". Kevin Smith's mentors criticized this ending; under the advice of one of the mentors, John Pierson, Smith edited out that ending. Therefore, the theatrical version ends when Randal leaves.

In Jay and Silent Bob Strike Back, Dante, like Randal, has a cameo early in the film in which the two clerks have Jay and Silent Bob arrested for loitering in front of Quick-Stop as well as for selling drugs in front of the store. As a result, a restraining order was placed on Jay and Silent Bob, who were not allowed within a hundred feet of the store. He and Randal attend the Bluntman and Chronic movie premiere, where Dante expresses chagrin that Judi Dench played him in the movie.

In Clerks II, Dante and Randal are forced to work at a Mooby's fast food restaurant after Randal accidentally leaves a coffee pot on in the Quick Stop, causing the store to burn down. It is revealed that Dante is engaged and is planning to move to Florida with his fiancée Emma. This leaves Randal feeling depressed, but does not express his upset at Dante over the decision until near the end of the movie. Randal also expresses his fears of losing Dante; under the persuasion of Randal, Dante decides to stay in New Jersey. With the two having been fired for Dante's very unconventional bachelor party at Mooby's, the two purchase the Quick Stop and the RST Video, which they restore and co-manage. He also calls off his engagement with Emma in favor of his boss, Becky.

Dante briefly appears twice in Jay and Silent Bob Reboot. The first is at the film's opening where he arrives at the Quick Stop to open the store and is quickly pulled aside by police officers. Not knowing what's going on, Dante assumes they are looking for Randal and offers to reveal his location. The second is at the film's end where he complains about the steel shutters being once again jammed with chewed gum, not even noticing Jay, Silent Bob and Jay's daughter Milly. Jay then revealed to Milly that he and Silent Bob had been pranking Dante by purposely putting in chewed gum in the locks for the past twenty-five years.

In Clerks III, Dante is still working in the Quick Stop with Randal. He is mourning the loss of Becky, who was killed along with their unborn child by a drunk driver. After Randal survives a heart attack, Dante agrees to help him make an independent film about their time working together at the Quick Stop. Throughout the film, Dante imagines himself talking to Becky, who tells him to move on with his life. After tensions grow, Dante and Randal get into a serious argument, and the stress causes Dante to suffer a heart attack. Randal, feeling remorseful, sneaks into the hospital and shows Dante their completed movie. Dante, touched by the film, peacefully dies, walking away with Becky.

=== Randal Graves ===
Randal Graves
- First appearance: Clerks (1994)
- Last appearance: Clerks III (2022)
- Created by: Kevin Smith
- Portrayed by: Jeff Anderson

In-universe information
- Gender: Male
- Occupation: RST Video store clerk/owner Mooby's restaurant clerk (Clerks II)
- Family: Mrs. Graves (mother)
- Relatives: Unnamed grandmother Brodie Bruce (cousin); Walter (cousin)

Randal Graves, played by Jeff Anderson, is a clerk at RST Video, located next door to the Quick Stop convenience store in Leonardo, New Jersey. Chris Smith in The New York Times described this character as a "smart-ass", while multiple reviewers have described him as a "super slacker". In the first film and the cartoon, Randal is a prime example of the typical slacker: He works in a dead-end job, has a hatred for customers, and arrives at work late every day. He periodically closes the store (during work hours) to chat with his best friend Dante Hicks, a Quick Stop clerk. Whereas Dante believes that title dictates responsibility, Randal does whatever he pleases.

Randal is usually quite aggressive and offensive (mainly to customers) and does not really seem to care much about what others think about him. He regularly arrives at the video store at least 15–30 minutes late and charges late fees to customers who have been waiting for the store to open. Often, he ignores customers' requests to recommend a movie, explaining that he does not meddle with other people's affairs (except perhaps those of Dante). He has been known to order porn movies for the store in front of children, spit water in customers' faces, and intrude on private conversations about sex.

One of Randal's ancestors, who was Scots-Irish, immigrated to New Jersey in the 17th century. Randal is related to Brodie Bruce of Mallrats. The two share a mutual "Cousin Walter", who is known for performing bizarre sexual acts, such as masturbating on a crashing aircraft and eventually killing himself while attempting to perform autofellatio. Both Brodie and Randal also mention stories regarding their grandmother. Brodie once mentioned she became a lesbian on her sixtieth birthday, while Randal mentioned that she used racial slurs in front of him as a child. The latter scenario influenced Randal into using the term "porch-monkey" in front of an African American couple while working at Mooby's. However, Randal did not know at that point that he used a racial slur and claimed he used the term to refer to lazy people of all racial backgrounds in general.

Randal's behavior at times appears contradictory; for example, he says that he hates people but loves social gatherings, and says, "This job would be great if it weren't for the fucking customers". Such behavior spills into his relationship with Dante, whom he often coerces into highly unlikely, theoretical situations by manipulating him into feeling guilty. Randal goes off on an analytical theory of something outlandish, before going to the complete opposite. He frequently causes problems in Dante's personal life by spilling secrets to those he should not.

Despite his toxic personality, Randal truly cares for his best friend Dante. He even once said to Dante's ex-girlfriend Caitlin, "Hey Caitlin. Break his heart again, and I'll kill ya. Nothing personal." To this, Caitlin remarks that he has always been very protective of Dante. Randal sees Dante as the "counterbalance" to the former's dislike of other people. Randal only goes to the Quick Stop instead of staying in the video store to talk to Dante about whatever comes to mind. Randal does his best to offer whatever advice he can to Dante, though Dante generally doesn't take it because of Randal's rather rough way of putting it. Randal has also attempted to do favors for Dante, although they often backfire. For example, in Clerks 2, Randal set up a donkey show as a going-away gift for Dante, who was to move to Florida with his then-fiancée, Emma. However, the show results in Dante and Randal getting arrested (alongside co-worker Elias, Jay, and Silent Bob), leading to a near-breakdown in their friendship. Another example was in Clerks, after Randal told Veronica that Dante left her for his ex-girlfriend, Caitlin Bree. However, not only was Randal unaware that Dante reconsidered his decision to leave Veronica for Caitlin, but a fight occurs between Randal and Dante after Veronica told him what Randal told her.

In Jay and Silent Bob Strike Back, Randal, like Dante, has a cameo early in the film, in which the two clerks have Jay and Silent Bob arrested for loitering as well as for selling drugs in front of the Quick-Stop. As a result, a restraining order was placed on Jay and Silent Bob, who were not allowed within a hundred feet of the store. He and Dante attend the Bluntman and Chronic movie premiere, where Randal mentions putting up another restraining order on Jay and Silent Bob because he is going to give the movie a scathing review on the Internet.

Randal's life centers on movies, video games, and pornography. He often quotes dialogue and discusses films, goes to other video stores to rent porn, and is often depicted in Clerks: The Animated Series with a porn magazine. His love life is nonexistent (at least in a romantic sense). The few relationships he had never lasted; his ex-girlfriends were subsequently so fed up with men that they became lesbians. In contrast, it is implied he has a budding sex life, despite his overall aimless existence; he frequently has girls over to his house, and brings them over to the Quick Stop when his mother is home. In Clerks II, it is stated that many of his sexual exploits are with "barely-legal pussy" (18-year-old girls), thanks in no small part to their willingness to take part in taboo sexual acts (such as what he and others refer to bluntly as ass-to-mouth). As evidenced in a scene in Clerks II, Randal's favorite band is King Diamond and he is a fan of 80s speed metal and black metal; he dislikes other music, such as the funk/soul band The Time. He is a fan of the novel Catcher in the Rye because it "recognizes the sheer volume of phonies in the world". Randal is also a fan of the Star Wars trilogy and Ranger Danger, and staunchly hates the Lord of the Rings and Transformers.

Randal is also frequently the cause of the problems that he and Dante get into, much to Dante's constant annoyance. Clerks: The Animated Series shows this at least once per episode, and it is mentioned in Clerks II that Randal is responsible for several of Dante's ruined relationships. This trait reaches its apex in the third episode of the animated series, where he almost gets Leonardo Leonardo destroyed by the U.S. Air Force after he mistakes the villain's food poisoning for the deadly motaba virus. It's also revealed here that he got his and Dante's jobs throughout the films and show; when Dante is teasing Randal for always being wrong, Randal retorts, "What about that time I told you about those two open jobs down the street? You know we'd stay there for a while, earn some money then move on with our lives." He then realizes that they have spent practically a decade at their jobs and yells, "Oh my God, you're right, I'm always wrong!" Randal is based on Smith's long-time friend Bryan Johnson.

Randal does not appear in Jay and Silent Bob Reboot, but is mentioned by Dante at the beginning of the film when Dante offers to tell the police where Randal is.

In Clerks III, Randal is still working in the Quick Stop when he suffers a widow-maker heart attack. Falling into a depression, Randall decides to make a movie about his life working at the Quick Stop, with the help of Dante, Jay and Silent Bob, and other locals. After Dante passes away from a heart attack, Randall mourns his loss, but continues to work at the Quick Stop, promoting Elias to be his "new best friend."

=== Veronica Loughran ===
Veronica Loughran
- First appearance: Clerks (1994)
- Last appearance: Clerks III (2022)
- Created by: Kevin Smith
- Portrayed by: Marilyn Ghigliotti

In-universe information
- Gender: Female
- Occupation: College student
- Significant other: Dante Hicks (ex-boyfriend)

Veronica Loughran, played by Marilyn Ghigliotti, is Dante's girlfriend in the beginning of Clerks. She is currently attending college and frequently makes attempts to encourage Dante to quit his dead-end job at the Quick Stop. Tensions arise between the two during a conversation about sexual relations, when Dante admits to having sex with 12 different women (including Veronica) and Veronica reveals that she performed oral sex on 37 men ("In a row?"), including Dante. Later, as an apology, Veronica returns to the Quick Stop with some lasagna for Dante. The relationship ends badly when Randal tells Veronica at the video store that Dante is dumping her to get back with Caitlin, despite the fact that Dante reconsidered this decision; as a result, Veronica storms in at the Quick Stop and attacks Dante before leaving.

Veronica does not appear in the sequel, but she is mentioned in a deleted scene, where Randal calls out Dante for going to Brookdale Community College just to appease Veronica. This implies they made up after the argument in the first film but subsequently broke up.

Veronica appears in Clerks III, having been inadvertently brought on board Randall's independent movie to play herself. She and Dante reconnect briefly, and have sex to blow off steam. She later attends Dante's funeral after he dies.

=== Willam Black ===
Willam Black was played by longtime View Askew film editor and producer Scott Mosier in Clerks, Jay and Silent Bob Strike Back, Clerks II, and Clerks III. He was played by Ethan Suplee in Mallrats and Clerks III. Willam is referred to as an "idiot man-child" by other characters in the View Askewniverse, mostly because of his limited intelligence and demeanor (glazed eyes, unkempt hair and beard, and lack of coordination). He has an oddly profane sexual taste, which includes snowballing, thus giving him his other nickname, "Snowball". He is often seen staring at ceilings and saying "That's beautiful, man!"

=== Caitlin Bree ===
Caitlin Bree
- First appearance: Clerks (1994)
- Last appearance: Clerks: The Animated Series (2001)
- Created by: Kevin Smith
- Portrayed by: Lisa Spoonauer

In-universe information
- Gender: Female
- Occupation: College student (formerly); Psychiatric patient
- Family: Mrs. Bree (mother)
- Significant others: Dante Hicks (ex-boyfriend); Alyssa Jones (fling); Unnamed various men (one night stands and flings); Sang (ex-fiance)

Caitlin Bree first appeared in Clerks. She was portrayed by Lisa Spoonauer. She was one of Dante's old girlfriends. Both of them express a desire to restart their relationship. At the end of the film, however, she has sex with a corpse at the Quick Stop bathroom, believing it to be Dante. After discovering this misunderstanding, she becomes catatonic. She is sent a mental institution to deal with her trauma afterward.

It was revealed in Chasing Amy that Caitlin and Alyssa Jones had a homosexual relationship that included fisting.

In the comic book Clerks: The Holiday Special, Dante visits Caitlin at the asylum located in Marlboro. Caitlin has not spoken a word since the incident, prompting Randal to suggest that Dante fornicate with Caitlin using a candy cane. Caitlin awakens from her catatonic state, but is furious and does not want to see him again.

Caitlin was also mentioned in Clerks: The Lost Scene and Clerks II.

In Kevin Smith's never-produced script Superman Lives, the governor is named Caitlin Bree. It is assumed, but not confirmed, to be the same Bree from "Clerks".

Smith named the character after his favorite Degrassi character, Caitlin Ryan.

=== Julie Dwyer ===
Julie Dwyer was first mentioned in Clerks as an old high school friend of Dante Hicks and Randal Graves who died at a swimming pool at a YMCA. Her funeral scene was eventually shown (in animated form), in Clerks: The Lost Scene, which appeared on the Clerks X DVD set. In Mallrats (which takes place the day before Clerks.), Dwyer is told that the camera adds 10 pounds, so she over-exercises before her appearance on the game show Truth or Date, which leads to her death. She is mentioned in Chasing Amy as a friend of Alyssa Jones. She is referred to again in Clerks II, where Randal mentions going to her funeral and his claim that Dante said he needs to "shit or get off the pot" (which Dante claims was actually said by Randal).

=== Rick Derris ===
First appearing in Clerks, Rick Derris was played by Ernest O'Donnell, (a childhood friend of Kevin Smith). Rick is a sexual deviant in the Askewniverse. In Clerks, while bragging about being more physically fit than Dante Hicks, he reveals to Dante that he had sex with his ex-girlfriend Caitlin Bree during their five-year relationship.

In Mallrats, Gwen Turner, T.S. Quint, and Brodie Bruce recall an incident at a costume party in which Derris and Turner had sex on a pool table. While Turner thinks it was a trivial event, Bruce and Quint remember the event very well because Derris and Turner were having sex on a pool table while dressed as Jackie Gleason and Burt Reynolds, respectively, from Smokey and the Bandit. In Chasing Amy, Derris and his friend Cohee London engaged in a three-way with Tricia Jones's older sister Alyssa Jones during high school, which gave her the nickname "Finger Cuffs". When Alyssa is confronted by Holden McNeil about this occurrence during Chasing Amy, Ernest O'Donnell makes a cameo sitting next to them and listening in. He was planned to be Jay's older brother, but as the movie in which this point would be addressed was never produced, Kevin Smith has stated that this is no longer the case.

=== Old Man ===
An unnamed elderly man, played by Al Berkowitz, approaches Dante and asks to use the restroom, which is normally for employees only. He disappears into the restroom after harassing Dante for both a softer roll of toilet paper, because the restroom's toilet paper roll is pretty rough, and a porno magazine to read. It is later on revealed that he died of a heart attack while masturbating over the magazine. His body maintains an erection as a result of rigor mortis. Dante does not take notice of this due to him closing the store to play hockey on the roof and attend Julie Dwyer's wake. In addition, the restroom light shuts off automatically at 5:14 p.m. for reasons unknown. As a result, Caitlin Bree winds up having sex with the elderly man's corpse, mistaking it for Dante.

=== Wynarski ===
A disgruntled RST Video customer, played by Lee Bendick, walks into the Quick Stop and confronts Dante about RST Video not being open. When Dante tells him Randal will show up soon, he comments that he once saw Randal sleeping. Dante says he wasn't sleeping, just resting his eyes. After the customer claims Randal isn't an air traffic controller, Dante sarcastically says it's Randal's night job. The customer then claims the reason Dante's working at Quick Stop and not "working a steady job" is because he (Dante) is a wise-ass. He then tells Dante to make sure Randal gets his VHS rental back and tells him his number, 812, and his name, Wynarski. He then leaves to go to Big Choice Video but leaves his keys on the counter, which Dante then throws away. When Randal arrives, Wynarski stops him outside the store and asks if he's seen his keys, to which Randal replies "No time for love, Dr. Jones" and leaves. Wynarski then says "Fucking kids" as he continues to search for his keys, not knowing Dante had thrown them out.

=== Chewlies Representative ===
A customer, played by Scott Schiaffo, pays for a cup of coffee and asks Dante if he can drink it beside the register counter. He then confronts a younger customer who is about to buy a pack of cigarettes, pulling out a cancer-ridden lung out of his handbag and showing him several effects of smoking before persuading him to buy a pack of Chewlies gum instead. Later on, he instigates a small demonstration to a crowd in the store by calling Dante a "cancer merchant" and comparing him and other cigarette sellers to the Nazis just because they both were "a group of hate-mongers just following orders". He then encourages the customers to throw cigarettes at him and to buy Chewlie's Gum instead. The revolt is stopped by Veronica, who sprays everyone with a fire extinguisher before stopping the customer from exiting. After discovering that he is a Chewlies representative, staging the anti-cigarette protest in order to strike up gum sales, she tells him to leave before telling the other customers to go back to their jobs.

=== Olaf the Russian Metalhead ===
Olaf, played by John Henry Westhead, is introduced by Jay as Silent Bob's Russian cousin. He is from Moscow and speaks very little English, but according to Jay, he runs a heavy metal band back in Russia and is looking to do a gig in New York City. A running gag throughout the film is Olaf's song "Berserker". A shirt for Olaf's band is worn by Jay throughout Jay and Silent Bob Strike Back.

== Mallrats (1995) ==
=== Brodie Bruce ===
Brodie Bruce
- First appearance: Mallrats (1995)
- Last appearance: Jay and Silent Bob Reboot (2019)
- Created by: Kevin Smith
- Portrayed by: Jason Lee

In-universe information
- Gender: Male
- Occupation: owner of "Brodie's Secret Stash"; Host of The Tonight Show (formerly)
- Family: Mr. Bruce (father); Mrs. Bruce (mother)
- Significant other: Rene Mosier (girlfriend)
- Relatives: Randal Graves (cousin); Walter (cousin)

Brodie Bruce (Jason Lee) is an unemployed, lazy, comic book-obsessed, Sega-playing slacker, living with his parents and lacking the initiative and prospects appropriate to his age. Kevin Smith has said Walt Flanagan was the inspiration for the character. Brodie is named after the main character in Jaws (a favorite film of Smith's, and one the director frequently references in his work), while his surname, Bruce, was the nickname given to the animatronic shark in Jaws.

His girlfriend, Rene Mosier, to whom Brodie's mother has never been introduced (out of fear on the part of Brodie), breaks up with him at the beginning of Mallrats and gives him a letter listing the reasons for doing so. At the end of the film they are back together, and it is mentioned that he went on to host The Tonight Show, with Rene as his band leader and having gained the approval from his mother. He makes a brief appearance in Jay and Silent Bob Strike Back in which he now owns his own comic book store called "Brodie's Secret Stash".

=== Rene Mosier ===
Rene Mosier (Shannen Doherty) is Brodie's girlfriend. She broke up with him prior to the events of the film and began dating Shannon Hamilton, a clothing store manager at the mall. Brodie confronts her about the relationship, an encounter that leads to the two having sex in an elevator. Shannon later assaults Brodie and claims that he and Rene will have sex in a "very uncomfortable place" (interpreted to be the back of a Volkswagen). However, this apparently never happens as Shannon is later arrested after Truth or Date for statutory rape, and Brodie and Rene reconcile. Later, when Brodie becomes the host of The Tonight Show, Rene serves as his bandleader.

Rene's last name is a reference to frequent Kevin Smith collaborator and close friend Scott Mosier. As a nod to her actor, who was well known for her role as Brenda Walsh on Beverly Hills, 90210, she is mistakenly referred to as "Brenda" by Willam at one point.

=== Shannon Hamilton ===
Shannon Hamilton is a character from Mallrats played by Ben Affleck.

In the film, Shannon is the manager of the Fashionable Male clothing store. He is the arch enemy of Brodie Bruce (Jason Lee), a local mallrat and a major character in the film. It is revealed that Shannon is dating Bruce's ex-girlfriend Rene Mosier (Shannen Doherty), who dumped Bruce that morning and also has "no respect for people with no shopping agenda". Shannon later abducts Bruce and beats him severely, saying that he likes comforting girls on the rebound of unsuccessful relationships so that he can "fuck them in an uncomfortable place", which Bruce asks if it's the back of a Volkswagen. This becomes a running joke in the film. Also, Tricia Jones (Renee Humphrey) reveals that she had sex with Hamilton as research for her book Borgasm: A Study of the 90s Male Sexual Prowess. She even taped their sexual encounter. During the Truth or Date game show, Bruce announces his love for Rene, which angers Hamilton. Just before he can assault Bruce, Silent Bob starts the video tape of Hamilton and Tricia Jones' sexual encounter that is played on the Truth or Date big screens. When Bruce tells the police that Jones is only 15 years old, Hamilton is arrested for statutory rape (while protesting "I thought she was 36!"). During the conclusion, it is said that "Shannon made a lot of friends at the Rahway State Correctional Facility" and see a hand wrap around Hamilton's, with "Love" tattooed on his fingers.

Shannon is mentioned in Chasing Amy, when Alyssa Jones says she had sex with him in college, only to have a tape of their sexual encounter be broadcast all over campus, thus retroactively making his comeuppance in Mallrats a case of poetic justice. In Clerks: The Comic Book, Shannon's face is seen on a milk carton which says he is missing.

When Kevin Smith was talking about making a sequel to Mallrats with the comic book Mallrats 2: Die Hard in a Mall, he stated that Hamilton would be the main villain.

=== Brandi Svenning ===
Brandi Svenning
- First appearance: Mallrats (1995)
- Last appearance: Mallrats (1995)
- Created by: Kevin Smith
- Portrayed by: Claire Forlani

In-universe information
- Gender: Female
- Family: Jared Svenning (father)
- Spouse: T.S. Quint
- Significant other: T.S. Quint (husband)

Brandi Svenning is one of the main characters in Mallrats, portrayed by Claire Forlani. She is the girlfriend (and later wife) of T.S. Quint, a central figure in the film. Brandi's relationship with T.S. begins in turmoil, as they break up early in the movie due to a misunderstanding involving a school trip and her obligation to participate in her father’s TV show, Truth or Date, as a replacement for a contestant who unexpectedly died.

Brandi is shown to be a sensible, kind, and determined character, often caught between the overbearing demands of her father, Jared Svenning (Michael Rooker), and her own desire for independence. Throughout the film, Brandi is pressured by her father to focus on the show and stay away from T.S., whom Jared dislikes. Despite this, Brandi still has feelings for T.S. and is clearly conflicted about the breakup.

Her reconciliation with T.S. is a major plotline, catalyzed by T.S.'s and Brodie Bruce's (Jason Lee) attempts to sabotage Truth or Date at the mall. During the show, T.S. publicly confesses his love and proposes to Brandi, which leads to their eventual reunion. At the end of the film, it is revealed that the couple married after graduation at Universal Studios, in front of the Jaws attraction, fulfilling his original plan.

She is later mentioned in Chasing Amy when a character claims to have had a relationship with her in the past.

=== Tricia Jones ===
Tricia Jones first appeared in the film Mallrats. She was portrayed by Renee Humphrey.

Tricia is the 15-year-old sister of Alyssa Jones and the author of Boregasm, a look into the sex drive of men between the ages of 14 and 30, which was later made into a movie.

While writing the book, she kept a journal of all the men with whom she had sex, and video taped every experience. The archived videos were used to help Brodie Bruce win back his ex-girlfriend, Rene, from his nemesis Shannon Hamilton.

Upon Brodie's urgent request, she gave Jay the tape of her sexual encounter with Shannon. Silent Bob was able to hack into the video output and play the tape during the live taping of Truth or Date. Shannon was thereafter arrested for statutory rape.

In the comic series Chasing Dogma, Jay and Silent Bob are seen living with Tricia, only to be kicked out after months of loafing around (and after Jay spied on her in the shower). It is revealed that she had slept with Silent Bob (but not Jay, much to Jay's annoyance) as part of research for Boregasm.

Tricia is briefly mentioned in Chasing Amy, when her sister Alyssa Jones informed Holden McNeil via telephone that her "sister is in town", to which McNeil replies, "the one who wrote the book?" Tricia also makes a brief appearance in Jay and Silent Bob Strike Back, where she discusses The Bluntman and Chronic Movie with Alyssa.

=== Gwen Turner ===
Gwen Turner
- First appearance: Mallrats (1995)
- Last appearance: Where's the Beef? (2006)
- Created by: Kevin Smith
- Portrayed by: Joey Lauren Adams

In-universe information
- Gender: Female
- Significant others: T.S. Quint (ex-boyfriend); Rick Derris (ex-boyfriend); Alyssa Jones (one night stand); Unnamed man (one night stand)

Gwen Turner is a supporting character in Mallrats. She was portrayed by Joey Lauren Adams.

Turner was the ex-girlfriend of T.S. Quint, one of the main characters played by Jeremy London. Despite cheating on him constantly, she still maintains a soft-spot for him.

Throughout Mallrats, Gwen is seen interacting with T.S. and Brodie. Her clothes shopping is often interrupted by Silent Bob crashing into her dressing room as she is changing. She also causes a major story point when she convinces Brandi Svenning (Claire Forlani) that T.S. was in fact a great boyfriend.

Gwen has been mentioned in other View Askew media. In Chasing Amy, Alyssa Jones mentioned that she left her prom so that she could have sex with her 26-year-old date and Gwen in a limo her parents had rented (this is something of an in-joke, as both Turner and Jones were played by the same actress). Also, in the Clerks comic book Where's the Beef?, Randal mentions that Dante Hicks tried to impress Gwen by wearing a Batman costume and standing on a roof top.

=== LaFours ===
LaFours is a character from the film, Mallrats, who works as chief security guard at the local mall. He was portrayed by Sven-Ole Thorsen.

LaFours is considered (even by Jay and Silent Bob) as one of the most intimidating security guards on duty, due to his size and strength; in fact he's even got "two kills" on his record.

Whilst attempting to get past LaFours in the destruction of the "Truth or Date" stage, Jay and Silent Bob mess up, resulting in both of them being pursued by him. We later see the chief security guard attempting to evict T.S. and Brodie from the mall, only to get hit from behind by Jay with a baseball bat. LaFours and his team attempt to take both him and Silent Bob down, but lose track of him when they use a grappling hook. He is also seen having sex with Tricia Jones later in the film. In the epilogue, he acquires a signed copy of Tricia's book (and perhaps even struck up a romance with her).

We also see LaFours on a large Bluntman and Chronic front cover, as seen at the comic book convention in Chasing Amy.

LaFours is a historical/movie reference to Joe LeFors from Butch Cassidy and the Sundance Kid. Both characters wear white skimmers and both are portrayed as legendary law enforcers within their respective films. A pun is also made about "use LaFours" in a way that makes the viewer recall "Use The Force" from Star Wars: A New Hope

=== T.S. Quint ===
T.S. Quint
- First appearance: Mallrats (1995)
- Last appearance: Mallrats (1995)
- Created by: Kevin Smith
- Portrayed by: Jeremy London

In-universe information
- Gender: Male
- Occupation: College student
- Spouse: Brandi Quint nee Svenning
- Significant other: Gwen Turner (ex-girlfriend)
- Relatives: Jared Svenning (father-in-law)

T.S. Quint (referred to as T.S. by friends) is one of the main characters in Mallrats. He was portrayed by Jeremy London.

In the film, T.S. is having trouble with his girlfriend Brandi Svenning (Claire Forlani) dealing with her authoritarian father, Jared (Michael Rooker). He tries to convince her to go to Florida, where he planned to propose to her at Universal Studios when "Jaws pops out of the water". This was ruined, however, when Brandi had to fill in for Julie Dwyer on her father's Truth or Date television pilot. T.S., showing his anger, causes Brandi to break up with him.

Filled with grief, T.S. joins fellow newly dumped best friend Brodie Bruce (Jason Lee) on a road trip to the local mall. Amongst many activities, the two realize that Jared's Truth or Date is being filmed live at the mall that evening. After being kicked out by mall security under Jared's orders, Brodie and T.S. get sage-like advise from a topless psychic in a dirt mall and return to stop the dating show. The duo successfully sabotage the show and T.S. finally proposes to Brandi, ending up with the two sharing a kiss.

In an epilogue to the film, it is revealed that T.S. and Brandi got married after they graduated at Universal Studios in Florida. They share their first husband-to-wife kiss just as Jaws pops out of the water.

In the original opening scene of Mallrats, while at the 37th Annual Governor's Ball, T.S., dressed as a Revolutionary Soldier for a musical at the event, gets a musket tied up in Brandi's hair while on the roof of the high school where the event is being held. The governor's security believe it's an assassination attempt and the event turns into a shoot out. The governor is injured and ruins the chance of Jared getting a check from her. Throughout this version, people in the mall recognize T.S. from television, to which he responds "I got a musket tied up in my girlfriend's hair for God's sakes". This line of the plot is referenced in the theatrical version of film when one of the television producers mentions the Governor's ball to Jared.

=== Steve-Dave Pulasti and Walt Grover ===
Steve-Dave Pulasti and Walt Grover
- First appearance: Mallrats (1995)
- Last appearance: Jay and Silent Bob Strike Back (2001)
- Created by: Kevin Smith
- Portrayed by: Bryan Johnson; Walt Flanagan

In-universe information
- Alias: Walt Flanagan
- Nickname: Walt The Fanboy
- Gender: Male
- Occupation: Comic Books Store Owners

Steve-Dave Pulasti (usually referred to as Steve-Dave) and Walt "the Fanboy" Grover made their first appearance in Mallrats. They are played by Smith's longtime friends Bryan Johnson and Walt Flanagan, respectively. Walt has a signature catchphrase; whenever Steve-Dave argues with a character, his comments will be followed by Walt saying "Tell 'em Steve-Dave!"

According to Johnson, the character of Steve-Dave is based on the owner of a comic book store that Smith, Johnson, and Flanagan once frequented; "Walter could never remember if the guy's name was actually Steve or Dave. So the name Steve-Dave was coined."

Steve-Dave and Walt also appeared briefly in Dogma; they had scenes in Chasing Amy and Jay and Silent Bob Strike Back that were cut from the final edit.

The duo have also appeared in most of the comic books based on the Askewniverse. They also appeared in a Jay and Silent Bob MTV short.

The duo have been made into action figures.

=== Jared Svenning ===
Jared is the father of Brandi Svenning, T.S's girlfriend. He is portrayed by Michael Rooker.

Jared is T.S's antagonist throughout the film, and Jared is seen being happy that Brandi and T.S. broke up. He is also in charge of the TV game show Truth or Date in which one of its shows was to take place at the local mall. After a confrontation with T.S. and during a new meeting with him, Brodie stinkpalms (In which Brodie inserted his own hand up his butt) Jared by shaking his hand and offering him chocolate pretzels (in which Jared holds every pretzel he eats with the hand that he shook Brodie's stink-palmed hand with). Jared unsuccessfully has Brodie and T.S. arrested, but they are rescued by Jay and Silent Bob. Jared becomes ill after getting stink-palmed, and his show is ruined. He is later arrested due to FCC violations on the show, caused by the other characters. In the extended cut of the film, Jared is later shown working as a janitor for the network.

Jared is referenced in Chasing Amy when Banky is telling Alyssa about his sexual encounter with Brandi.

=== Willam Black ===
Willam Black is a minor character in both Clerks (where he was portrayed by Scott Mosier) and Mallrats (portrayed by Ethan Suplee). Throughout the film he is seen trying to find a sailboat within an autostereogram, constantly failing at it while other characters, including T.S., Brodie, Rene, some kids, and Stan Lee, succeed. At the end of the film he finally snaps and wanders around the mall moaning about the sailboat, unknowingly hitting the stage at a crucial point when Silent Bob is trying to retrieve a video tape he dropped and causing it to go right back into Silent Bob's hands. During the credits it is revealed that Willam eventually found the sailboat, although Willam himself seems surprised. In subsequent comic books, Willam makes cameo roles, still lamenting about the sailboat. He returns in Clerks III (bizarrely, alongside Mosier's version of the character), where he auditions for Randal's movie about the Quick Stop but scares the production team by screaming about the sailboat, explaining it came from a personal experience.

== Chasing Amy (1997) ==
=== Holden McNeil ===
Holden McNeil
- First appearance: Chasing Amy (1997)
- Last appearance: Jay and Silent Bob Reboot (2019)
- Created by: Kevin Smith
- Portrayed by: Ben Affleck

In-universe information
- Gender: Male
- Occupation: Comic Book Creator
- Significant others: Alyssa Jones (ex-girlfriend; also co-parent of his child)
- Children: Amy Jones (biological daughter)

Holden McNeil is the main character in the film Chasing Amy. The character is played by Ben Affleck. Throughout the film he is trying to develop a working relationship with Alyssa Jones, who is a lesbian. He is the co-creator of the fictitious comic book Bluntman and Chronic. Kevin Smith has stated that Holden is the View Askewniverse character most similar to himself.

Holden also appears in Jay and Silent Bob Strike Back, living in a small barnhouse and giving Jay and Silent Bob information about the internet. He was named after the lead character Holden Caulfield from Catcher in the Rye.

Holden appears again in Jay and Silent Bob Reboot where it is revealed that he and Alyssa are both business partners in their successful podcast and he has donated his sperm to Alyssa and her wife so that they can have a child together, even he also helps co-parent Amy with Alyssa. Jay and Silent Bob bumps into both Holden and Alyssa at "Chronic-Con" where they just finished recording a podcast and they even introduce their daughter to the men. Holden tells Jay and Silent Bob that fatherhood has given him a purpose in life and this now inspires Jay to abort their mission to stop Kevin Smith from making the Bluntman and Chronic reboot and be a father and to support his daughter Milly. The two men decides to leave to find Milly and her friends but not before Holden gives Jay, Silent Bob, Milly and the others VIP badges (since he and Alyssa are both Guests of Honor to Chronic-Con), which will grant them access to the panel with Smith.

=== Banky Edwards ===
Banky Edwards
- First appearance: Chasing Amy (1997)
- Last appearance: Jay and Silent Bob Strike Back (2001)
- Created by: Kevin Smith
- Portrayed by: Jason Lee

In-universe information
- Gender: Male
- Occupation: Comic Book Creator/Inker
- Significant other: Hooper LaMante (boyfriend)

Banky Edwards is a major supporting character in Chasing Amy. He was played by Jason Lee. Banky is Holden McNeil's lifelong best friend and co-created the smash hit Bluntman & Chronic with him. Banky is very protective of Holden and finds his infatuation with Alyssa Jones to be disgusting. He also exhibits many examples of ignorant homophobic behavior throughout the film, which eventually leads to him and Holden breaking off their friendship, ending the comic.

Banky returned in Jay and Silent Bob Strike Back. Having received exclusive movie rights for Bluntman and Chronic, Banky has allowed a film adaptation to go through production which sets Jay and Silent Bob on an adventure to stop this from taking place. Banky is on the set when Jay and Silent Bob arrive, attempting to make Hollywood connections. After arguing with the two stoners while a gun fight is taking place, Banky agrees to give the two of them part of his profits in exchange for the film going through. However, the film turns out to be a huge bomb which effectively ends Edwards' career.

In Chasing Amy, Banky, an inker on Bluntman and Chronic, is accused by a comic book fan (Scott Mosier) of being "a tracer", which leads to a fight. In a deleted scene from Jay and Silent Bob Strike Back, the fan returns to call Banky a tracer once again, which results in another confrontation.

Banky does not appear in Jay and Silent Bob Reboot but he is mentioned when Jay questioned Holden McNeil if he was still partners with Banky, but Alyssa Jones responds to Jay that they are not. It is unknown if Holden is still in contact with Banky or if they are still friends.

=== Hooper LaMante ===
Hooper LaMante (a.k.a. Hooper X) is a character from Chasing Amy played by Dwight Ewell. A gay man himself, he tells Holden to accept Alyssa's sexuality and try not to worry about it.

Hooper is seen again at the end of Jay and Silent Bob Strike Back, walking out of the premiere of the Bluntman and Chronic: The Movie with Banky. While Banky is in shock of the fact that the movie will ruin him, Hooper says that the movie was like "watching Batman & Robin all over again". It's also implied that he has at least a sexual relationship with Banky; when Banky makes a remark about Hooper "taking shaft as opposed to being Shaft" Hooper replies "I don't hear you complaining."

In an extended deleted scene, we hear Hooper continuing, "Well, I don't hear you complaining nightly. In fact, all I hear from you is, 'Yes, Hooper. Cram the balls! Work the shaft! And..." To which Banky responds "Hey! Hey, HEY! What'd we say? Not in public.", implying that the two men are in a secret relationship together.

=== Alyssa Jones ===
Alyssa Jones
- First appearance: Chasing Amy (1997)
- Last appearance: Jay and Silent Bob Reboot (2019)
- Created by: Kevin Smith
- Portrayed by: Joey Lauren Adams

In-universe information
- Gender: Female
- Occupation: Comic book artist
- Family: Tricia Jones (sister); Heather Jones (sister)
- Spouse: Unnamed wife
- Significant others: Caitlin Bree (fling); Dante Hicks (ex-boyfriend); Two unnamed guys (hookups); Shannon Hamilton (one night stand); Gwen Turner (one night stand); Unnamed man (one night stand); Holden McNeil (ex-boyfriend; also co-parent of her child)
- Children: Amy Jones (daughter)

Alyssa Jones is the main character in the film Chasing Amy. She is played by Joey Lauren Adams.

In Chasing Amy, she meets Holden McNeil and Banky Edwards at a comic book convention in New York where the two men are promoting their comic Bluntman and Chronic. Holden is attracted to her, but soon learns that she is attracted to women. The two begin hanging out and both of them develop a deep friendship, however, Holden is no longer able to contain his feelings and confesses his love to Alyssa. She at first is initially angry with him, but that night, the two begin a romantic relationship. Their new relationship worsens the tension between Holden and Banky, who dislikes and distrusts Alyssa and is bothered by her and Holden's relationship. Banky investigates and uncovers Alyssa's past and he tells Holden that Alyssa participated in a threesome with two guys in high school which gave her the nickname "Finger Cuffs". Holden is deeply disturbed by this revelation, having believed that he is the first man Alyssa had ever slept with. Holden angrily confronts Alyssa while attending a hockey game. During a tearful argument, she admits to Holden about her "many" youthful sexual experimentations and apologizes for letting him believe that he was the only man she had been with, however, she refuses to apologize for her past actions, and Holden leaves feeling angry and confused. Inspired by Silent Bob's story, Holden devises a plan to fix both his relationship with Alyssa and his fractured friendship with Banky. Holden invites both of them over to his place and tells Alyssa that he would like to get over her past and remain as her boyfriend and also tells Banky that he realizes that Banky is in love with him; kissing him passionately to prove the point. Holden suggests that the three of them have a threesome. While Banky agrees to participate, however, Alyssa refuses, explaining to Holden that it will not save their relationship. Before leaving, Alyssa tells Holden that she loves him, but she will not be his whore. One year later, Alyssa is busy promoting her new comic at a convention in New York, where Banky (also promoting his comics in the same convention) gestures Holden to her booth and provides wordless encouragement to talk to her. They have a quiet, emotional conversation and Holden gives her a copy of his new comic "Chasing Amy", which is based on their relationship and tells her goodbye. After Holden leaves, Alyssa's new girlfriend arrives and asks who he was. A shaken, misty-eyed Alyssa replies, "Oh, just some guy I knew".

Alyssa briefly appears in Jay and Silent Bob Strike Back where she was seen walking out of the movie theater with her sister Tricia after they saw the premiere of Holden McNeil's comic book movie Bluntman and Chronic. On the way out Tricia asked her sister on why they didn't make his story Chasing Amy into a comic and Alyssa quips back that no one would believe that story.

Alyssa appears in Clerks: The Lost Scene before her first appearance in Chasing Amy. She attends Julie Dwyers' funeral (who was a good friend of hers) where she bumps into Dante Hicks. She explains to him of Julie originally going to attend Jared Svenning's Truth or Date television pilot before her unfortunate demise when she drowned in a swimming pool in YMCA and Caitlin Bree's recent engagement. Randal Graves comes up to them and interrupts their conversation when he greets Alyssa, even calling her by her famous nickname "Finger Cuffs". Alyssa, who despises Randal greatly, insults him before walking away.

Alyssa briefly appears in Jay and Silent Bob Reboot where it is revealed that she and Holden are both business partners in their successful podcast and she is also now married and has a daughter named Amy with her wife, Holden had also donated his sperm to her and her wife so that they can have a child together, even Holden also helps co-parent Amy with Alyssa. Jay and Silent Bob bumps into both Holden and Alyssa at "Chronic-Con" where they just finished recording a podcast and they even introduce their daughter to the men before Alyssa leaves to go greet her wife.

== Dogma (1999) ==
=== Bethany Sloane ===
Bethany Sloane is played by actress Linda Fiorentino. Bethany was born in 1961 (which makes her 38 during the events in Dogma), and was raised as a devout Roman Catholic. When she was five years old, a neighborhood kid named Bryan Johnson urinated in her hand (Bryan died of leukemia two years later). She didn't tell anyone about the incident, until it was revealed to her by Rufus 30 years later.

Upon leaving high school, Bethany attended Carnegie Mellon University in Pittsburgh with her high school sweetheart, Brett Waits. She became pregnant sometime in 1981, but after an argument with Brett about whether or not to have the child, Bethany has an abortion. She tells him, however, that she has had a miscarriage.

Upon graduating from Carnegie Mellon, Bethany and Brett get married and attempt to start a family. However, Bethany had an infection inside her uterus stemming from her abortion years earlier, making her unable to have children. When Bethany tells Brett about what had really happened, Brett divorces Bethany and some time later, marries another woman.

While Bethany is talking to her mother about her personal crises, Bethany loses her faith in God. Shortly afterwards, Bethany settles in McHenry, Illinois and works at an abortion clinic. Her faith is restored when she is recruited by the Metatron to save existence from two renegade angels, simultaneously learning that she is the last living relative of Jesus Christ. The unique friendships she forms with various previously unknown figures from history during her journey, and their insights into her past and the world around her, inspire Bethany to regain her faith and strength. At the film's conclusion, she has miraculously become pregnant.

=== Bartleby and Loki ===
Bartleby and Loki are two characters from Dogma. They were portrayed by Ben Affleck and Matt Damon, respectively. Bartleby's name comes from the short story "Bartleby, the Scrivener" and Loki's comes from the Norse god of the same name.

Back during the earliest days of earth, Bartleby became friends with Loki, the Angel of Death. After Loki finished slaughtering the first born Egyptians, the two went out for a post-slaughter drink. During a drunken conversation, Bartleby convinces Loki that he should give up slaughtering humans in the name of God. Loki, taking the advice seriously, presents himself before God, throws down his fiery sword and gives God the finger. God, enraged by this act, banishes the two to a fate worse than Hell: spending eternity in Wisconsin (also decreeing that angels can no longer drink alcohol). After a couple of millennia the two are anonymously clued into a little-known loophole through plenary indulgence, thanks to a New Jersey church celebrating its centennial. The two decide to journey to New Jersey in hopes of getting into Heaven, not knowing that it will wipe out the omniverse in the process.

After a mishap on a bus, the two end up getting an update from the demon Azrael (Jason Lee) about Heaven's and Hell's search for them and the threat of the Last Scion Bethany Sloan (Linda Fiorentino). The two decide to take his advice to lie low. They take a train to New Jersey, which happens to have Bethany and her friends on it. When their identities are revealed, the two then fight the group until they are thrown out of the moving train by Silent Bob. This is where Bartleby suddenly changes his genial, easy-going attitude to one of angst-ridden revenge against the Lord, and Loki changes his attitude to a more pacifist, meek one. The two walk the rest of their way to Jersey and arrive just in time for the church's centennial celebration. Here, after interrupting, Bartleby and Loki start to kill everyone at the event one by one, knowing their own souls will be clean once they enter the church.

Bethany and company arrive at the scene to find a drunken, wingless Loki swirling around dead bodies while Bartleby flies above. When Bartleby announces his plan to his foes, a drunken Loki turns a new leaf and tries to stop Bartleby, because as a side effect of cutting his wings off and becoming human, Loki now has a conscience. Bartleby stabs Loki in the gut, killing him. After having his wings shot off by Jay, Bartleby heads for the church, but is interrupted by Metatron (Alan Rickman) and God Herself (Alanis Morissette). Kneeling before Her and only uttering "Thank you", Bartleby is killed by the sound of Her voice, with all other humans covering their ears at the time this happens remaining unharmed.

Smith talked about making a one-issue comic book about Bartleby and Loki. It would show the story of how the two are banished to Wisconsin. As of October 2006, the comic is still on his agenda.

A joke made by Ben Affleck in a Train Wreck video for Clerks II was turned into a rumor that Bartleby would return in said film via a brief cameo appearance. Affleck did make a cameo in the film, but as a new character.

Damon reprised his role as Loki in a fourth-wall breaking scene in Jay and Silent Bob Reboot, where he explains to the audience God banished him to Earth once more, this time into the Mediterranean Sea, where he was found by fishermen and found to have amnesia. He declares this makes his current form his reborn identity, before congratulating himself on the pun.

=== Cardinal Glick ===
Cardinal Ignatius Glick
- First appearance: Chasing Dogma (1998)
- Last appearance: Dogma (1999)
- Created by: Kevin Smith
- Portrayed by: George Carlin

In-universe information
- Gender: Male
- Occupation: Cardinal

Cardinal Glick is a character from Dogma, played by George Carlin.

Glick was the head minister of a local New Jersey church that is celebrating its centennial. In hopes to get publicity for this event, Glick announces the Catholicism WOW! campaign which he uses to update the Catholic Church for a younger generation. The leading symbol of the campaign is the Buddy Christ, which Glick describes as a more realistic depiction of Jesus Christ than the Christ-on-a-Cross depiction. His campaign is nearly put in jeopardy when the film's main characters Bethany, Rufus, and Jay and Silent Bob try to stop the centennial celebration so that the two fallen angels Bartleby and Loki can't carry through with their plenary indulgence plan. Glick refuses to comply due to his needs for the WOW! campaign. The two angels arrive during the celebration and kill all in attendance, including Glick.

Glick can be seen briefly in a few panels of Chasing Dogma.

== Clerks: The Animated Series (2000) ==
=== Leonardo Leonardo ===
Leonardo Leonardo
- First appearance: "Leonardo Leonardo Returns and Dante Has an Important Decision to Make" (2002)
- Last appearance: "The Last Episode Ever" (2002)
- Created by: Kevin Smith
- Portrayed by: Alec Baldwin

In-universe information
- Gender: Male
- Occupation: Billionaire tycoon

Leonardo Leonardo, voiced by Alec Baldwin, is a billionaire villain in Clerks: The Animated Series. In the series' first episode "Leonardo Leonardo Returns and Dante Has an Important Decision to Make", it is revealed that in the early 1800s, Leonardo's great-grandfather Bernardo Leonardo purchased the land that was to be Leonardo, NJ, from the Indians for $14.8 million. Leonardo himself achieved his fortune decades ago when he explored parts of Canada and acquired exclusive Canadian mineral rights in exchange for introducing the polio virus to the natives. Leonardo returns to his hometown and introduces the population to his superstore "Quicker Stop" in an attempt to put Dante and Randal out of business. His plan fails when the two clerks slash their prices by 75%. He also fails to bribe the clerks into working for him by offering them full benefits, stock options and enrollment in college. Dante and Randal later on discover Leonardo's true motives for returning to the town: he will replace all of the stores with a theme park-style Canadian goods shop, followed by a domed pleasure paradise made to be New Jersey's premier tourist destination. The clerks also discover that Leonardo's scheme involves decimating the town's population. Dante and Randal quickly thwart Leonardo's plan and the Quicker Stop is inadvertently destroyed by Jay and Silent Bob.

Though he has not appeared in any View Askewniverse films to date, his catchphrase "well played, clerks" is reused by Emma Bunting in Clerks III.

=== Mr. Plug ===
Mr. Plug, voiced by Dan Etheridge, is Leonardo Leonardo's butler. A parody of Oddjob from Goldfinger, Mr. Plug has a heavy-set Asian build; his voice, however, is somewhat high-pitched and feminine. It is revealed in the episode "Leonardo Is Caught in the Grip of an Outbreak of Randal's Imagination and Patrick Swayze Either Does or Doesn't Work in the New Pet Store" that Mr. Plug is actually a robot.

=== Lando ===
Lando, voiced by Mario Joyner, is an African-American character introduced by Dante and Randal in the episode "Leonardo Is Caught in the Grip of an Outbreak of Randal's Imagination and Patrick Swayze Either Does or Doesn't Work in the New Pet Store" in response to a viewer letter asking why the show does not have any black characters. Seen as a jab on tokenism (and sharing his name with Lando Calrissian, the token character from Star Wars), Lando sporadically appears in two episodes, often just walking across the screen. At the end of the aforementioned episode of his debut, he is about to share some words of wisdom with Dante and Randal when the scene suddenly cuts to Jay and Silent Bob's segment. The character makes his live-action debut in Clerks III, portrayed by Marc Bernardin.

=== Charles Barkley ===
Charles Barkley voices a fictionalized version of himself. He appears in the show's ending segments trying to educate the kids. However, Jay and Silent Bob always chase him away. In one episode, he appears as part of a basketball team who make up the jury for a court trial between Jay and Dante.

== Jay and Silent Bob Strike Back (2001) ==
=== Marshal Willenholly ===
Federal Wildlife Marshal Willenholly is a character from Jay and Silent Bob Strike Back. His name comes from Land of the Lost's three main characters Rick Marshal, Will and Holly (in a deleted scene, Willenholly called an FBI agent named Sid N. Marty (played by comedian Adam Carolla), a reference to Sid and Marty Krofft, who created Land of the Lost). The character was portrayed by Will Ferrell, who would later portray the lead character Rick Marshall in the motion picture adaptation of Land of the Lost.

After the film's heroes are framed for a jewel heist, Willenholly arrives to investigate the lesser crime that involved the two in the theft of an orangutan named Susanne from the Provasic animal testing facility. Willenholly, along with a slew of Utah state police officers (the lead played by Brat Pack member Judd Nelson) catch the three at the local Arena diner. When Jay and Bob come out with Susanne (dressed as a child), they claim that "he" is their gay love child. Willenholly lets them go, not realizing that the "kid" was a monkey until it is to late. Willenholly follows them into the sewers and into the duct of a dam. Susanne manages to trick Willenholly to jump out of the duct and into the water so that she, Jay and Bob can escape.

Willenholly later arrives at the station house, soaked from head to toe. There, he receives information that Jay and Bob are going to Hollywood. He ends up on Miramax studios, searching for the two and has a few near fatal mishaps on the way. When Willenholly finds the two on the set of the Bluntman and Chronic film, he engages in a shootout with the female gang that actually pulled off the jewel heist. After knocking out the three other members of the gang, the fourth member Justice (Shannon Elizabeth) gives Willenholly the diamonds, confesses to the heist and asks for a reduced sentence so that she could get off to be with Jay. Willenholly, hoping it will boost his career, agrees. Willenholly and Justice are later seen walking out of the Bluntman and Chronic film premiere, Willenholly being the only character to say something positive about the film. He is also seen dancing at the Morris Day and the Time concert.

== Clerks II (2006) ==
=== Becky Scott ===
Rebecca Hicks née Scott
- First appearance: Where's the Beef? (2006)
- Last appearance: Clerks III (2022)
- Created by: Kevin Smith
- Portrayed by: Rosario Dawson

In-universe information
- Nickname: Becky/Becks
- Gender: Female
- Occupation: Mooby's restaurant manager
- Family: Mr. Scott (father); Mrs. Scott (mother)
- Spouse: Dante Hicks
- Children: Grace (unborn daughter)
- Relatives: Donald Hicks (father-in-law); Mrs. Hicks (mother-in-law)

Becky (nicknamed Becks by Dante Hicks and Randal Graves), played by Rosario Dawson, is a lead female character in Clerks II. She is the manager of the Mooby's where Dante and Randal work. Dante does her nails [like he did with Veronica in the first film] during his breaks. Becky does not believe in romantic love, instead deciding that life and relationships are about "fucking as much as possible"; accusing society of peddling marriage and families in order to sustain the economy.

During the course of the film, she develops a relationship with Dante, as they talk to each other very often in the office. When Dante tells her he does not know how to dance, she offers to teach him some steps on the restaurant's rooftop to the tune of the Jackson 5's "ABC". During the dance, she reveals to him that she is pregnant, as they had a one night stand on a restaurant prep table a few weeks back. At the end of the film, Dante breaks off his engagement with Emma and proposes to Becky at Mooby's. She accepts and helps Dante and Randal reopen the Quick Stop.

In Clerks III, it is revealed that a pregnant Becky was killed by drunk driver shortly after the events of Clerks II. Dante is still mourning her loss. Throughout the film, Dante imagines himself talking to her, as she offers him words of encouragement and attempts to help him move on.

=== Elias Grover ===
Elias Grover, portrayed by Trevor Fehrman is a 19-year-old born again Christian employee at Mooby's alongside Dante and Randal. Elias is obsessed with both The Lord of the Rings and Transformers, and is always subjected to Randal's jokes and abuse. Despite constantly harassing him, Randal insists that after Dante leaves for Florida, Elias will be Randal's new best friend. With the aid of Jay and Silent Bob, Elias gets high during the donkey show that Randal set up at Mooby's and despite his religious views, Elias is seen masturbating during the show, apologizing to God the whole time. At the end of the film, he applies for a job at RST Video and becomes a clerk after Dante and Randal reopen the Quick Stop.

In Clerks III, Elias is still working in the Quick Stop while also selling NFT's on the side. After coming to believe that a prayer he said caused Randall to have a heart attack, he renounces God and becomes a Satanist. He helps Randall make a movie about his life over the course of the film. At the end of the movie, his NFT's unexpectedly become successful, and he makes over $1 million, which helps Randal pay off a debt he owes to Emma Bunting.

=== Emma Bunting ===
Emma Bunting appears in a supporting role in Clerks II. (She is played by Jennifer Schwalbach Smith, Kevin Smith's wife.) In the beginning of the film, she is engaged to Dante and both are to drive to Florida the next day to live in a new house and run a car wash. She shows her affection for Dante by wearing a T-shirt that reads "Mrs. Hicks". Randal, however, sees Emma as a threat to his friendship with Dante. In the middle of the film, Dante falls for Becky. Emma arrives at the restaurant that night and sees them kissing. Angered by the scene, Emma throws her engagement ring at Becky and a cake at Dante and runs off.

Emma was the typical popular, attractive, rich girl in high school, leading her to a series of disappointing relationships as she dated the popular guys. She eventually learned to seek the "unconventional" men for a relationship, leading her to Dante.

In Clerks III, Dante convinces Emma to loan him money to help Randall make his movie. After his death, Emma comes to New Jersey to collect what he owes her. Randall and Elias are able to pay her back.

=== Lance Dowds ===
Lance Dowds appears in the film Clerks II. He was portrayed by Jason Lee. He was an arrogant student who was bullied frequently in high school, earning the nickname "Pickle Fucker" after taking part in a high school hazing which involved the seniors shoving a pickle up his anus. After graduating, he founded a search engine called MadDucats.com and sold it to Amazon.com for $20 million, making him an Internet multi-millionaire. He appears in just one scene where he criticizes Dante and Randal, who are still working in dead-end minimum wage jobs, before ordering food from them. In response to Lance's comments, Randal prepares his food by secretly placing dead flies on the hamburger and using ice from a urinal for the drink. Lance, however, gives the meal to Jay before leaving the restaurant. Jay and Silent Bob are seen eating the meal outside, with Jay asking Silent Bob, "This tastes like piss and flies don't it?"

=== The Sexy Stud ===
The Sexy Stud appears as a supporting role in Clerks II. He is played by Zak Charles Knutson. He appears near the end of the film during the donkey show Randal set up as a celebration for Dante's later canceled plans of moving to Florida. Randal at first believed a woman was going to have sex with the donkey, and also believed that the Sexy Stud was the pimp (Randal first thought that Kelly was the supposed name of the woman while the donkey was the Sexy Stud). However, the Sexy Stud revealed that the donkey is Kelly while he himself was the Sexy Stud. The Sexy Stud performed sexual acts on the donkey that both appall and fascinate Becky, Dante, Randal, Jay and Silent Bob. But Elias, who watched the show as well, was too drunk to be aware that there was no woman in the show. Along with Dante, Randal, Elias, Jay and Silent Bob, the Sexy Stud is arrested as a result of the show. Even though he gets released from jail along with the others, the Sexy Stud is forced to pay a fine for his actions.

== Zack and Miri Make a Porno (2008) ==
=== Brandon St. Randy ===
Brandon St. Randy, portrayed by Justin Long, is a gay porn star turned lawyer. He is the boyfriend of Bobby Long (portrayed by Brandon Routh), the high school ex-boyfriend of the titular character Miri (portrayed by Elizabeth Banks).

In Jay and Silent Bob Reboot, Brandon is Jay and Silent Bob's (and Saban Films') lawyer. Kevin Smith confirmed that Long was reprising his role as Brandon and that the move was meant to retcon the earlier film into the View Askewniverse. Long's character was not named because Smith does not own the rights to Zack and Miri.

== Jay and Silent Bob Reboot (2019) ==
=== Milly Faulken ===
Millennium "Milly" Faulken, portrayed by (Harley Quinn Smith, Kevin Smith's daughter) is Jay's estranged daughter (with mother, Justice Faulken), and a member of the girl gang.

Milly is seen in Clerks III at Dante's funeral, as well as filling in for the Quick Stop "milk maid" during the closing scene.

=== Kevin Smith ===
Kevin Smith is the in-universe version of director Kevin Smith (portrayed, appropriately, by Kevin Smith). Milly notes that he bears more than a striking resemblance to Silent Bob.

== Clerks III (2022) ==
=== Blockchain Coltrane ===
Blockchain Coltrane, portrayed by Austin Zajur, is Elias' new friend that assists with their NFT venture, Buddy Christ Kites. Blockchain rarely speaks (usually only in whispers to Elias), and is labelled as "Elias's own Silent Bob" by Randal.

=== Doctor Ladenheim ===
Doctor Ladenheim, portrayed by Amy Sedaris, is responsible for reviving Randal after his heart attack. She later warns Dante that he should also worry about heart attacks. She is named after the real-life cardiologist Dr. Marc Ladenheim, who saved Kevin Smith from dying of a widow-maker in 2018.
