= Tiny Jesus =

Social media trend involving figurines of Jesus

A Tiny Jesus figurine on Hillsborough Street in Raleigh, North Carolina

Beginning in 2024, a trend on social media involving the hiding of Tiny Jesus, Mini Jesus, or Little Jesus figurines in various high-traffic locations began. The trend has since spread outside its origins in the United States, and has received mostly positive coverage from both Christian and secular sources. It was ongoing and still being reported on as of July 2026.

Starting as a prank by a church's youth group in Hampton, South Carolina, the act grew in popularity after it became viral on TikTok. The figurines, which are made of rubber and are only about an inch (2.5 cm) tall, have since appeared in multiple countries and at landmarks, including the United States Capitol. They have been positively commented on by celebrities including Fátima Bosch and John Schneider, while criticism has been made regarding the trend's unsolicited nature. The figurines have been treated by some as good luck charms, and compared to similar trends such as Jeep ducking and The Kindness Rocks Project.

== Description ==
The figurines are made of rubber and are slightly over 1 in (25 mm) tall. They depict Jesus Christ after his resurrection (albeit without stigmata), smiling with his arms outstretched. While all figurines tend to follow this structure, they can vary in the color of sash Jesus is wearing, skin color, and their ability to be used as an eraser. They are often purchased with the intent to be hidden as part of an internet trend, with orders typically containing bulk amounts of figurines in packs of 100 to as high as 300. Hashtags such as "ALittleJesusGoesALongWay", "JesusLovesYou", and "SpreadingTheLove" have been used in accompanying posts of those participating in the trend. The trend most often refers to the figurines as "Tiny Jesus", "Mini Jesus", or "Little Jesus", with none of them being the definitively correct one.

== History ==
The trend started in January 2024 at Lighthouse Church in Hampton, South Carolina, after a group of youth decided to place a large number of the figurines around the premises. A TikTok video filmed by the church's pastor, Brian Trent, in response to the prank became viral receiving over 600,000 views and started the trend. The trend is characterized by participants buying and placing the figurines in various high-traffic locations including churches, hospitals, stores, and restaurants. Alternatively, the figurines have also been placed in more personal settings, such as locations intended for specific friends, co-workers, or police officers to find. Its motto since its inception has been "A Little Jesus Goes A Long Way"; a play on words in relation to the Tiny Jesus figurines. They are on occasion also placed with an accompanying positive or biblical message on a notecard. In addition to TikTok, the trend soon spread to other social media, including Facebook and Instagram.

In May 2024, the trend was further popularized when Trent made a follow-up video asking participants to mail figurines to him with their home state or country on the back. The appeal was successful, and saw figurines arrive from every U.S. state, two U.S. territories, and eight countries after one month. Since then, Mexican model and Miss Universe 2025 Fátima Bosch, American media personalities Khloé Kardashian and Kris Jenner, American football executive John Schneider, and American Idol contestant Philmon Lee have participated and shared their experience online, further popularizing the trend. In March 2025, figurines were placed around the United States Capitol in areas such as the National Statuary Hall and at the nearby Cannon House Office Building. Shortly after being placed, the figurines were removed by Architect of the Capitol workers, and it is unknown who placed them. The trend was ongoing and still being reported on as of July 2026.

== Reception ==
The figurines and their accompanying trend have received mostly positive reception. The Greeneville Sun described the figurines as "cute" and highlighted their appeal to youth, describing several occasions where they were used as a form of good luck charm. The Coastland Times shared similar views in regards to youth appeal, noting the trend was similar to Jeep ducking and The Kindness Rocks Project. Workers from a cafe in Australia, in an interview with The Standard, talked about how the figurines have become commonplace, and how they've been helpful to those in the area. Loretto College School, an all-girls Catholic high school in Toronto, Canada, stated the trend around the figurines were good symbolism for how "Jesus is [...] often found in unexpected places and moments".

Criticism of the trend has been made regarding its unsolicited nature. The Bellingham Herald specifically cited an incident in 2024 when the figurines were placed in mailboxes around a neighborhood in Bellingham, Washington: an act technically illegal under Title 18 of the United States Code, section 1725, which states that placing anything other than stamped mail in a mailbox can be subject to a fine.

== See also ==
- Buddy Christ
- Cultural depictions of Jesus
- Viral marketing
