= Simone Legno =

Italian artist (born 1977)

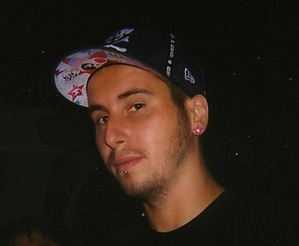
- Legno in 2008
- Born: Simone Legno; 16 June 1977 (age 49); Rome, Italy
- Education: Istituto Europeo di Design
- Occupation: Artist
- Years active: 2000–present
- Known for: tokidoki
- Partner: Kaori Matsumoto
- Website: tokidoki.it

Simone Legno (Italian: [siˈmoːne ˈleɲɲo]; born 16 June 1977) is an Italian artist best known for the creation of the tokidoki brand. Legno states his designs are influenced by his interest in Japan and its culture, as well as street art and graffiti.

== Early life ==
Legno was raised in a Catholic family in Rome. After dropping out of college, where he studied political science, Legno studied at the Istituto Europeo di Design in Rome. Legno built Tokidoki as a personal website around 2001.

During his time in school, he developed a profound admiration for Japanese art and culture, nurturing a desire to create his own website dedicated to these passions. He would visit Japanese cultural centers. His body of work drew inspiration from literature, encompassing a diverse array of sources such as Lonely Planet guides, art prints, and Japanese art books and posters. Each artwork drawn with a passion towards Japanese culture. In his quest for a Japanese term, he settled on "tokidoki," meaning "sometimes." Tokidoki symbolises how "Sometimes dreams come true and sometimes things happen for you" During a past interview, Legno articulated, "It empowers us to confront each new day with resilience, to envision uplifting possibilities, and to nurture the hope that something extraordinary may unfold in our lives." Tokidoki embodies a harmonious fusion of diverse visual elements and cultural influences, representing an exquisite synthesis of contrasting forces coexisting in unity.

== Career ==
Legno's career started when he was still in school in Italy, where he created a website as a visual diary and platform to showcase his portfolio of works. With this website, he created various illustrations, advertisements, designs, and other freelance media for clients. He was then discovered and presented a partnership by Pooneh Mohajer and her husband Ivan Arnold—co-founders of the American cosmetics brand Hard Candy. In 2004, Simone Legno moved to Los Angeles to develop his tokidoki merchandise and art, where he launched his artistic career with the help of Arnold and Mohajer. Simone Legno has definitely surprised the contemporary world with an art collection that is "cute, playful, and pure, yet provocative, [and] sophisticated."

Legno's portfolio website was listed as one of the top ten websites of the week by The Independent in 2003. This caught the attention of Hard Candy co-founder Pooneh Mohajer and her husband Ivan Arnold. The two contacted him, and after meeting, they formed the tokidoki business venture.

Legno's work includes characters such as the "Moofia," "Cocomando," "Wild Boys," "'Til Death Do Us Part," and "Cactus Friends," which include personified cows, tigers, and monkeys, or Japanese-inspired characters in bright outfits. Legno also creates acrylic on canvas works featuring "more modern, fashionable versions of the women found on classic Japanese woodblock prints."

In July 2023, a 400-page monograph titled "tokidoki – The Art Of Simone Legno" was launched which compiles his art and business projects over the year.

Since relocating from Rome to Los Angeles, Legno's art has become prominent in the pop culture scene. As stated by Legno: "Tokidoki is a happy world... that I imagine, live and dream of".

Legno has produced individual works as well as collaborations with other artists outside of tokidoki. Among Legno's more notable works is Luce, the official mascot of the Catholic Church’s 2025 Jubilee. Legno has also created merchandise for AS Roma, his childhood favorite football team in Italy’s Serie A league. Simone regularly attends San Diego Comic-Con, and makes appearances at various locations worldwide for signings and promotions with tokidoki.

=== Gallery Representation ===
- Hong Kong, K11 Art Mall.
- Vinyl Toys, art-skateboards, pin badges, jewelry, watches, knitwear, sportswear, accessories, shoes, stationery, and more to come.
- tokidoki distributes its products to Nordstrom, Macy's, Fred Segal, Karmaloop and approximately 1000 boutiques in more than 60 countries worldwide.

=== Past projects ===
- ProjectFOX
