= Luce (mascot) =

Mascot of the 2025 Jubilee

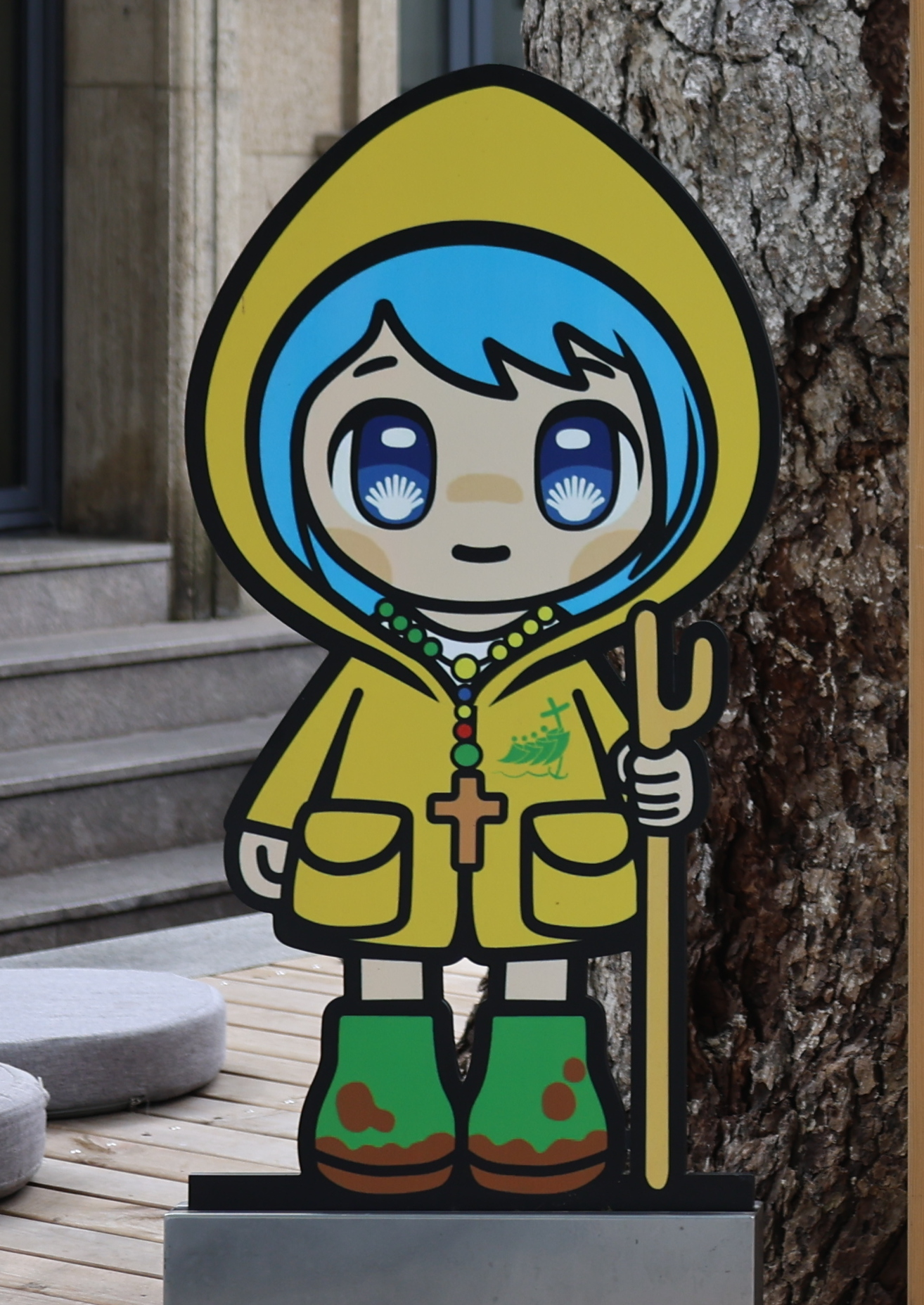
- First appearance: October 28, 2024
- Created by: Simone Legno

In-universe information
- Gender: Female
- Religion: Catholic

Luce (Italian: [ˈluːtʃe], lit. 'Light') is the official mascot of the Catholic Church's 2025 Jubilee. Designed by tokidoki founder Simone Legno, she represents a Catholic pilgrim. She is accompanied by a pet dog named Santino and three friends named Fe, Xin, and Sky.

== Description ==
Luce has blue hair, blue eyes and pale skin, and wears a yellow raincoat, which is colored in reference to the flag of the Vatican City as well as a symbol for "journeying through life's storms". She carries a pilgrim's staff, which represents "the pilgrimage toward eternity", and wears mud-stained boots to represent "a long and difficult journey". Her eyes have highlights in the shape of a scallop shell, a traditional symbol of Catholic pilgrimage; her shining eyes were described as "a symbol of the hope of the heart". Luce also wears a multi-colored World Mission rosary around her neck.

Simone Legno, Luce's designer, said that he hoped "Luce can represent the sentiments that resonate in the hearts of the younger generations".

== History ==
Luce was unveiled by Archbishop Rino Fisichella of the Dicastery for Evangelization on October 28, 2024, as the official mascot of the 2025 Jubilee. He said that Luce was inspired by the Catholic Church's desire "to live even within the pop culture so beloved by our youth".

Luce represented the Holy See at Lucca Comics & Games in 2024, which was the first time that the Vatican officially participated in a comic convention. At Lucca Comics & Games, a large inflatable display of Luce became a popular selfie spot. Additionally, she appeared at Expo 2025 in Osaka, Japan.

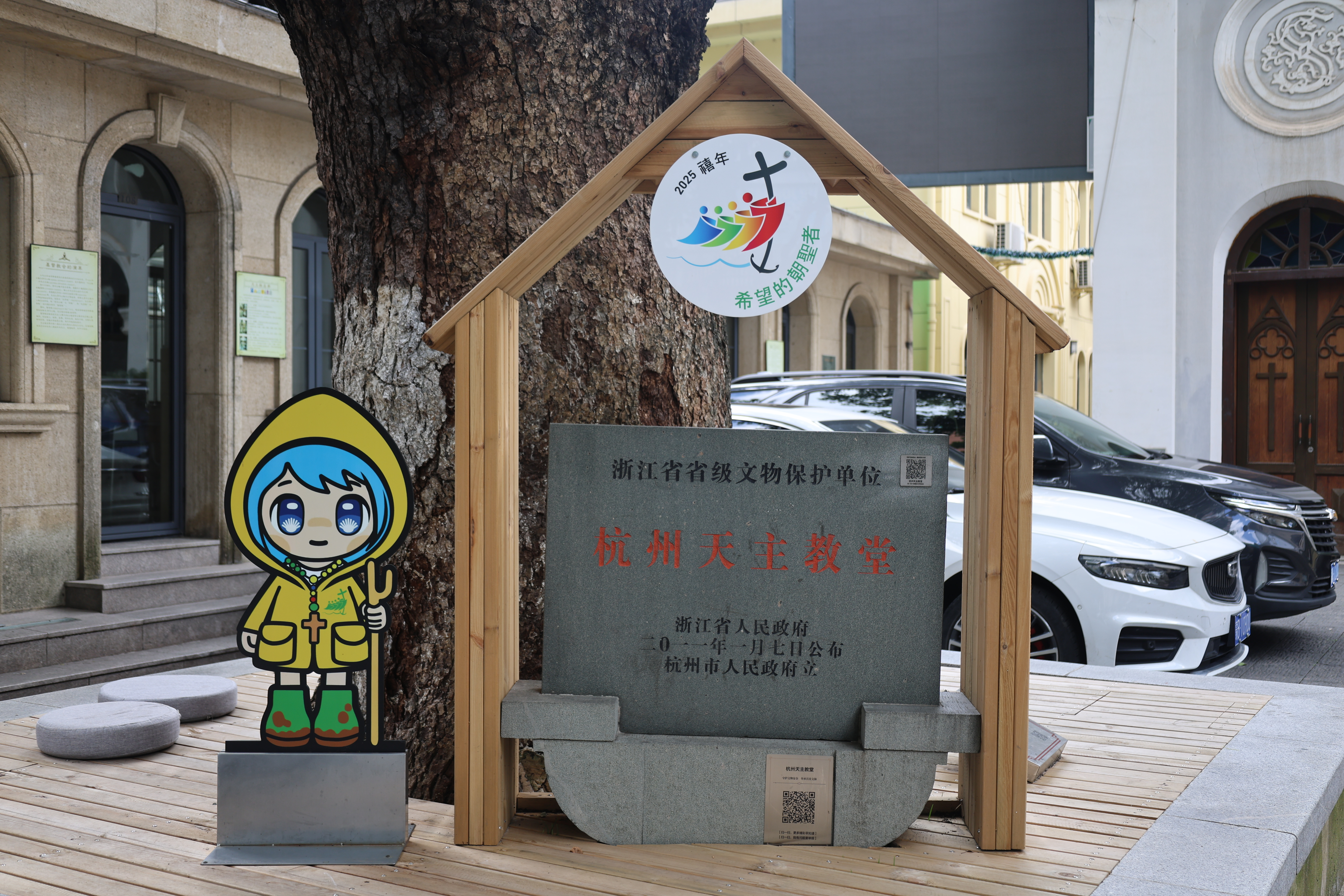
Artwork of Luce on display outside of the Cathedral of the Immaculate Conception in Hangzhou

Luce was used on several countries in Asia, including Hong Kong and Indonesia. Schools run by the Catholic Church distributed dolls, key chains, bookmarks, stickers, and other merchandise of Luce to students. Some schools used Luce to teach students about prayer. Bishop Joseph Ha, OFM, of the Diocese of Hong Kong wrote that, "After Luce was launched, it was immediately welcomed by a large number of church members, especially teenagers and children...To this day, Luce and her friends can be seen in many chapels and schools."

== Reception ==
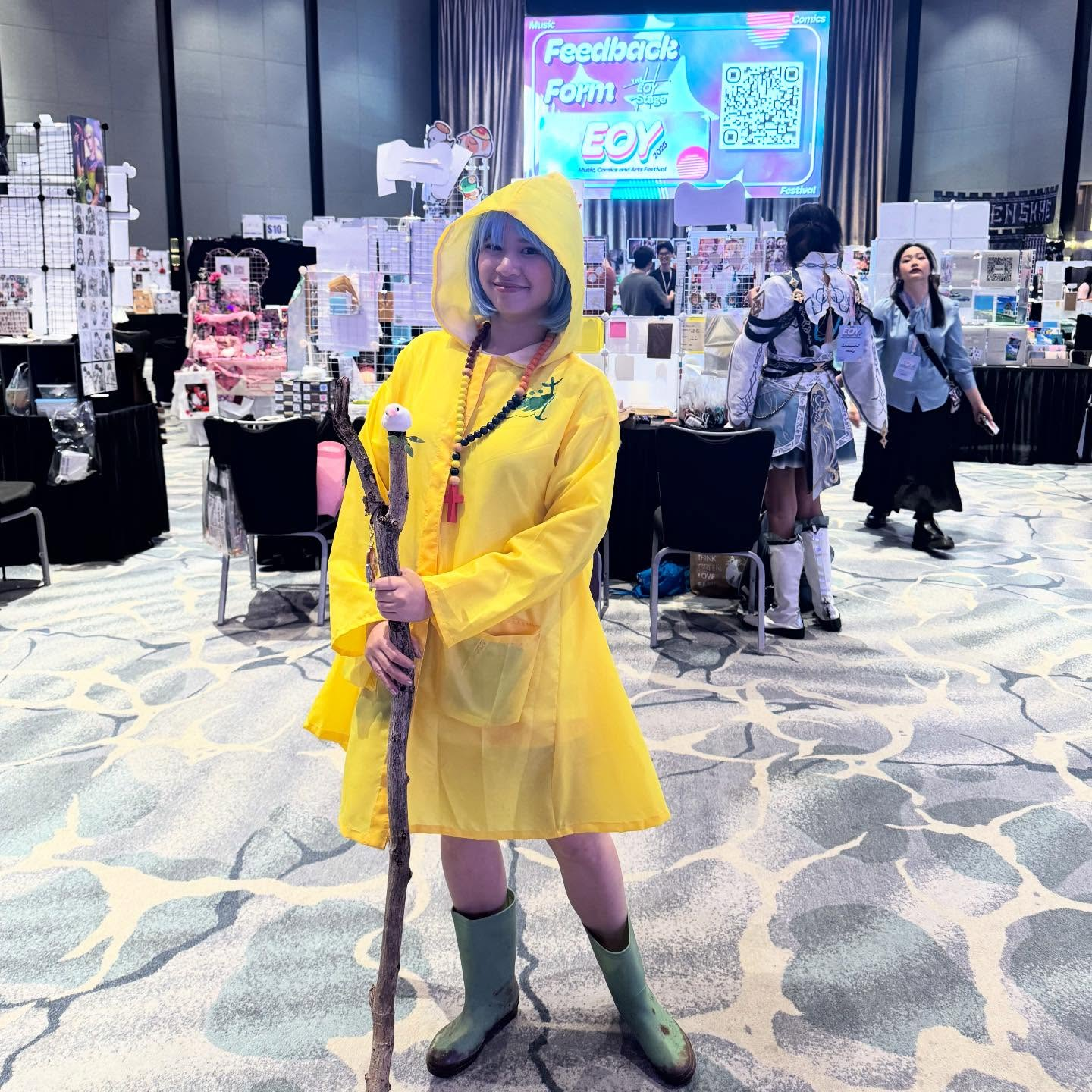
A cosplayer portraying Luce

Following Luce's unveiling, she quickly spawned Internet memes, fan art, and cosplay.

The designs and general artstyles of Luce and her friends have been compared to anime characters, and users on websites such as Twitter have joked about the Catholic Church embracing anime visuals. Comparisons were drawn between Luce's design and the designs of Ai Ohto, the protagonist of Wonder Egg Priority, and Rei Ayanami from Neon Genesis Evangelion. Emanuele Vietina, the director of Lucca Comics & Games, stated that Luce shared characteristics with the character Arale Norimaki from Dr. Slump.

Luce drew mixed reactions from Catholics. While many approved of her, some traditionalist commentators criticized her as "too modern and silly" to represent Catholicism. Some pushed back on the multi-colored rosary, claiming a resemblance to the pride flag; however, the rosary's colors are from the World Mission rosary created by Fulton Sheen.

Ken Iikura-Gross of Anime News Network compared the Catholic Church's use of an anime mascot to Buddy Christ from the 1999 film Dogma. In the film, Buddy Christ is a marketable and relatable redesign of Jesus Christ aimed to attract younger audiences to Catholicism. Kevin Smith, the director of Dogma, remarked that "Buddy Christ winked so Luce could dilate".
