= Pilgrim's staff =

Walking stick used by Christian pilgrims

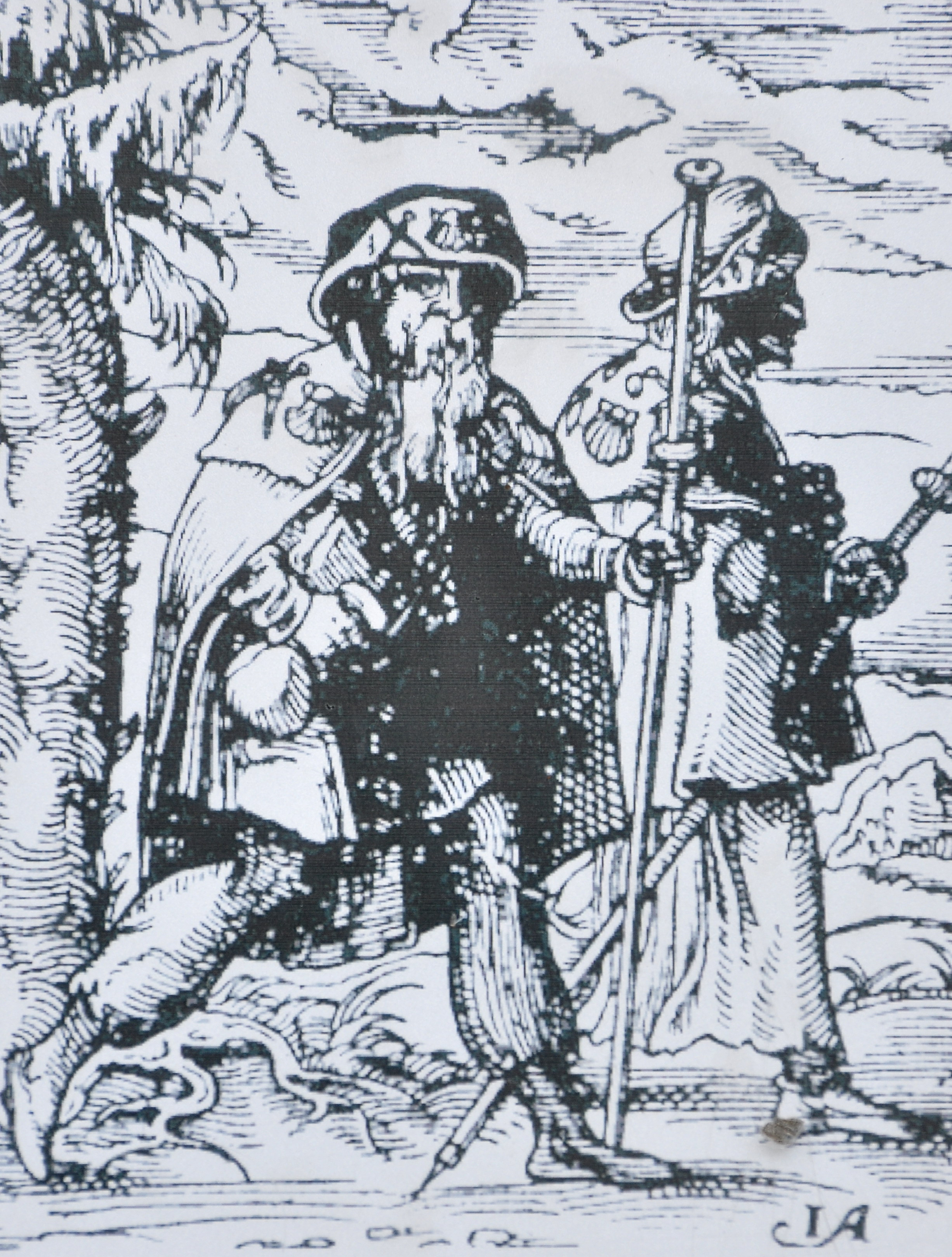
Way of St. James pilgrims with pilgrim's staffs (1568)

The coat of Arms of Bever, Switzerland, featuring a pilgrim with a staff

A pilgrim's staff, palmer's staff, or bourdon is a walking stick used by Christian pilgrims during their pilgrimages, like the Way of St. James to the shrine of Santiago de Compostela in Spain or the Via Francigena to Rome.

== Background ==
In Rome, in the Middle Ages the pilgrims used to leave their stick in the church of San Giacomo Scossacavalli, whose first denomination was San Salvatore de Bordonia, where Bordone is the Italian word for Stick. After that, they bought a new stick by sellers named Vergari, whose shops were in today's Borgo Santo Spirito near the church of Santa Maria dei Vergari.

Generally, the stick has a hook on it so that something may be hung from it. The walking stick sometimes has a cross piece on it. The pilgrim's staff has a strong association with the veneration of Saint James the Great and the Way of St. James. The pilgrim's staff commonly features in heraldry, especially ecclesiastical heraldry.

A pilgrim's staff features prominently in the design of Luce, the official mascot of the 2025 Jubilee.

== See also ==
- Cross of Saint James
- Crozier
- Jacob's staff
- Khakkhara
- Pilgrim badge
- Pilgrim's hat

== Sources ==
- Borgatti, Mariano (1925). Borgo e S. Pietro nel 1300–1600–1925 (in Italian). Roma: Federico Pustet.
- Gigli, Laura (1992). Guide rionali di Roma (in Italian). Vol. Borgo (II). Roma: Fratelli Palombi Editori. ISSN 0393-2710.
