= Pilgrim badge =

Effects worn by Christian pilgrims

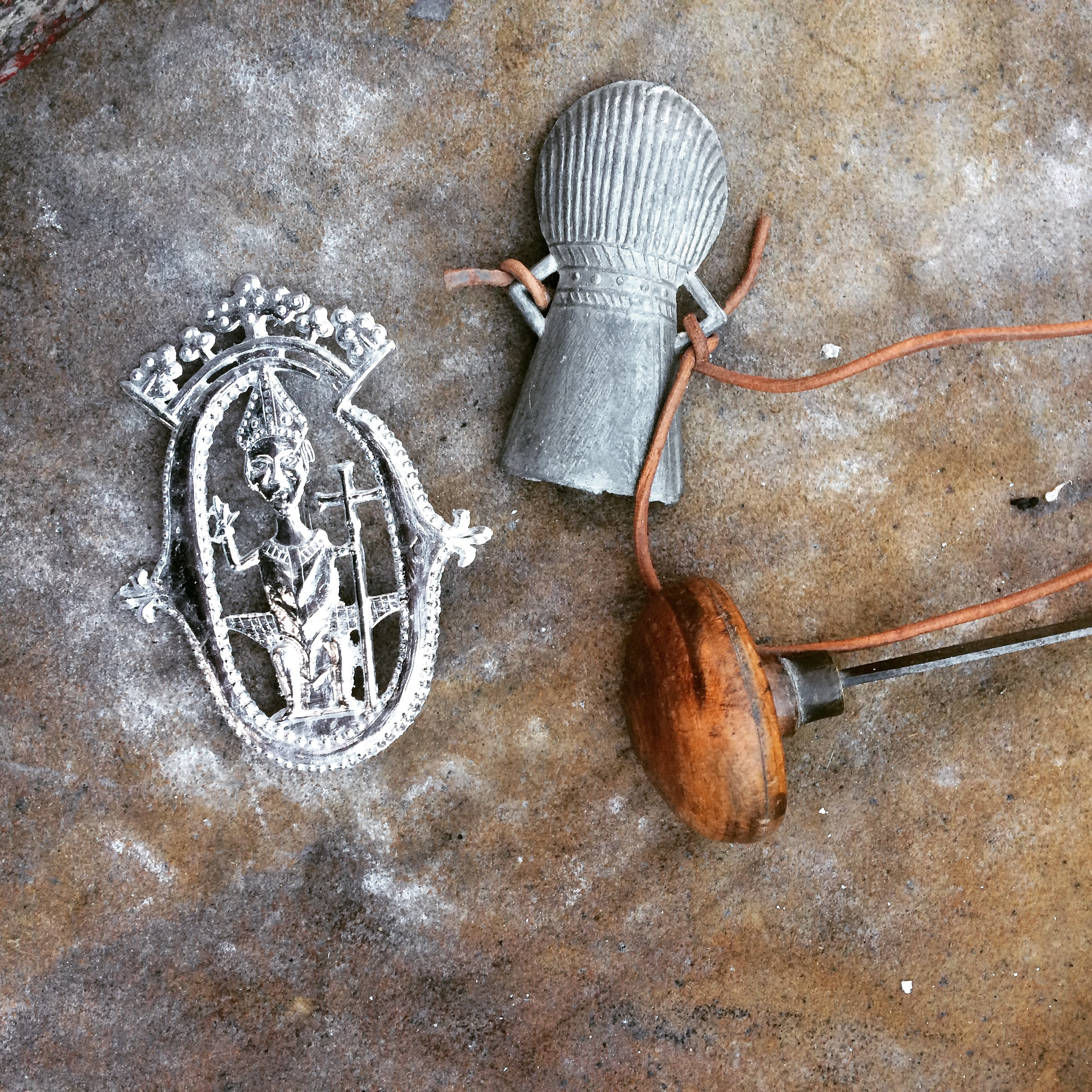
A modern, authentically made replica shows how shiny lead alloy souvenirs would have looked when they were bought by medieval pilgrims.

Pilgrim badges are decorations worn by some of those who undertake a Christian pilgrimage to a place considered holy by the Church. They became very popular among Catholics in the later medieval period, and continue to be bestowed upon those who complete Christian pilgrimages, especially those of the Catholic and Evangelical-Lutheran traditions. Typically made of lead alloy, they were sold as souvenirs at sites of Christian pilgrimage and bear imagery relating to place to which the believers traveled to (e.g. palm frond associated with Jesus' triumphal entry into Jerusalem). The production of pilgrim badges flourished in the Middle Ages in Europe, particularly in the 14th and 15th centuries, but declined after the mid-16th century. Tens of thousands have been found since the mid-19th century, predominantly in rivers. Together they form the largest corpus of medieval art objects to survive to us today. In the present day, pilgrim certificates are typically bestowed upon those completing a Christian pilgrimage by the destination church, without any cost.

Pilgrimage sites housed a saint's relics: sometimes the whole body, sometimes a body part or significant object owned or touched by the saint. For example, St Thomas Becket was martyred at Canterbury Cathedral in England in 1170 and his body remained there, becoming the epicentre of an enormously popular cult. In 1220 it was translated into a costly shrine. The pilgrim souvenirs associated with his cult have a particularly diverse array of imagery, including that of his shrine, his head reliquary and scenes from his life. Other major sites that produced badges were Santiago de Compostela, Cologne, Our Lady of Rocamadour and Jerusalem. Their badges bore images that were iconic and easily recognisable, such as the scallop shell, the Adoration of the Magi, the St Peter or the Jerusalem Cross. Shrines to the Virgin were common all over Christendom, as are badges associable with her. They often show her holding the Infant Christ, or represent the first letter of her name.

The practice is continued by some today. Christians who complete the Pilgrim's Route to Nidaros Evangelical-Lutheran Cathedral in Trondheim receive a pilgrim certificate that is given by permission of the cathedral. Likewise, those who complete the pilgrimage to Vadstena Abbey Evangelical-Lutheran Church by journeying through Saint Birgitta Ways are bestowed with a pilgrim certificate after attending Mass there. Knights and dames of the Equestrian Order of the Holy Sepulchre receive a pilgrim badge when they travel to the Holy Land.

== Origins ==
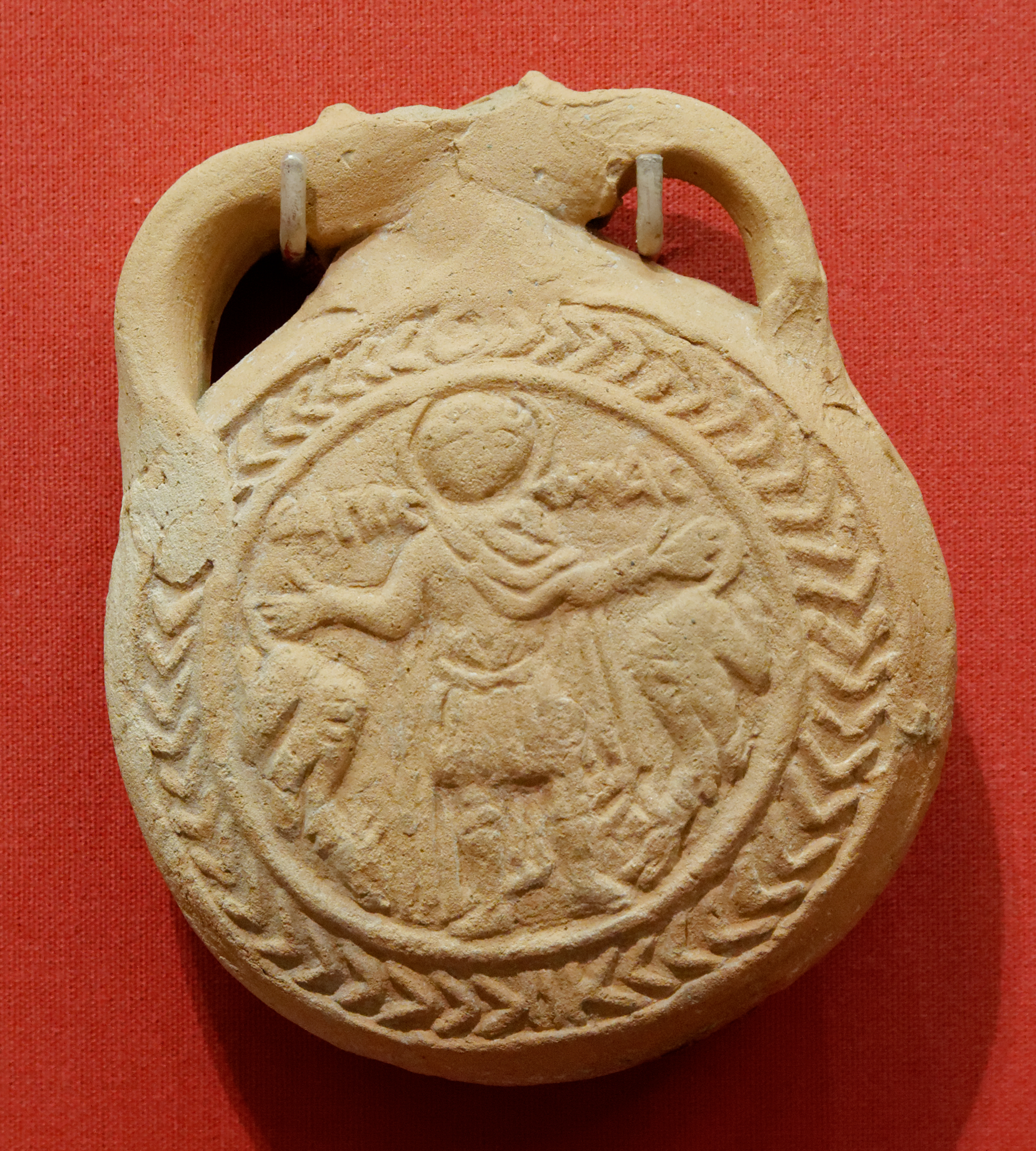
4th-7th century clay pilgrim flask or ampulla. Pilgrims used ampullae like this to carry water or oil from the pilgrimage site for Saint Menas: a late-third-century Egyptian Roman soldier who was martyred for his Christian faith. He is shown between the two camels who returned his body to Egypt for burial

Various cultural practices converged to bring about the pilgrim badge. Pilgrims had long sought natural souvenirs from their destination to commemorate their trip and bring home some of the site's sanctity. The earliest and still iconic pilgrim 'badge' was the scallop shell worn by pilgrims to the shrine of Santiago de Compostela. Along with badges, vendors at holy sites sold ampullae, small, tin vessels designed to carry holy water or oil from the site. The later metal examples derive from clay ampullae sold from the Early Middle Ages to pilgrims to the Holy Land and other sites in North Africa and the Middle East. These often bore images from the saint's life. The main vessel of the early ampullae from the shrine of St Thomas Becket is often textured to appear like a scallop shell, showing how flat, wearable signs and ampullae came to be conflated in the medieval imagination. Badges and ampullae were worn while travelling and allowed others to identify the wearer as a pilgrim and the saint they were visiting. They showed the wearer's special relationship with the saint and could be called upon in times of crisis. Badges were an artistically legible and affordable accessory for the ordinary medieval pilgrim to wear.

== Manufacture and use ==
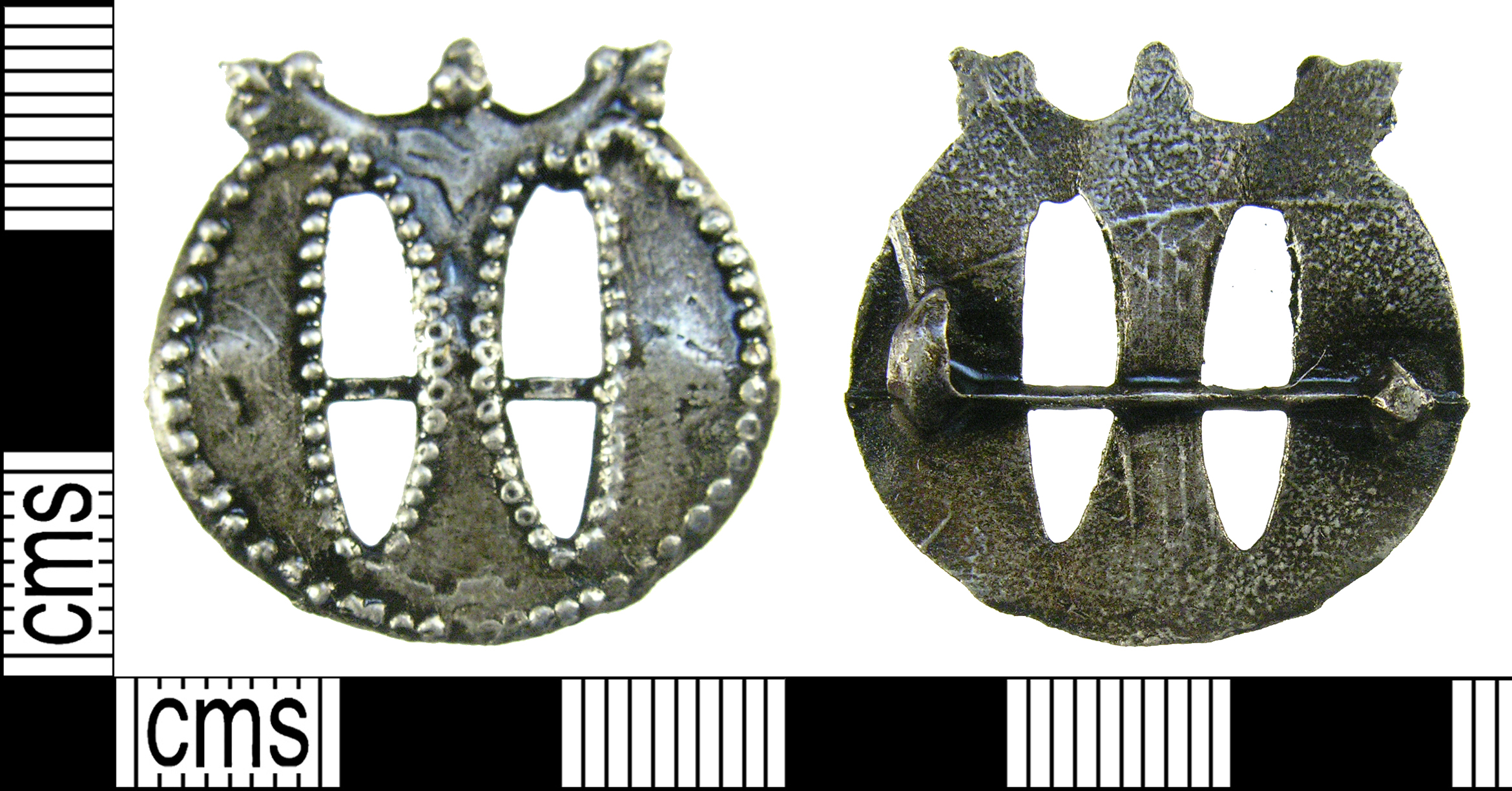
A medieval cast lead alloy monogram of Maria pilgrim badge. The badge is in the shape of a Lombardic 'm' with crown above. The crown is formed of three projections; the two outer projections are trefoil and the central is a single collared knop. The outline of the 'm' has a beaded border and in the gaps between the columns of the 'm' the casting seam can be seen. The reverse of the badge is plain; the catchplate has survived intact but only the stump of the pin remains

Pilgrim badges were cheaply mass-produced, cast in moulds made of bronze, cuttle-bone or limestone, or, less frequently, by die-stamping. Their easy reproducibility and modest media meant that they were affordable to a wide range of people. British pilgrim badges often have an integral pin and clasp on the reverse whereas continental European badges more usually have sewing loops, but this is not a hard and fast rule. Pilgrims wore badges on their outer clothing and hats or around the neck to show where they had been on pilgrimage. Some were designed to be fixed to the top of pilgrim staffs. Freshly cast, lead alloy is shiny and bright but it tarnishes rapidly.

To make thin, lead alloy badges, makers would have to create a eutectic alloy. Only at a specific ratio would lead and tin cast thin enough to make the most of the cheapest metal. The quality of pilgrim badges varied considerably, with some being naive and crudely made and others displaying great craftsmanship and skill. Ampullae, vessels for holy water or oil, were harder to make than badges, necessitating a process called slush casting. Much rarer examples were made in precious metals for the wealthy; these have mostly been recycled for their valuable materials over the centuries.

By the later Middle Ages, thin, precious metal badges were being produced that were perfectly designed for being sewn into books. Manuscripts survive with badges still in them, or imprints on the pages where they once were. It is often possible to identify the shrine from the imprint. As artists became increasingly fascinated by illusionism or the trompe l'oeil technique, representations of pilgrim badges painted into the margins of prayer books appear.

The most popular shrines sold over 100,000 badges a year, making pilgrim badges the first mass-produced tourist souvenir. In 1520, the church at Regensbury sold over 120,000 badges to medieval pilgrims, after a drastic shortage the previous year.

There are some suggestions that pilgrims could request food from people living along the pilgrimage route, with shell-shaped badges being used to measure out portions small enough they could be donated without leaving the donor short.

== Archaeology ==
Today, most pilgrim badges are recovered in or near rivers. Lynn Museum in Norfolk has a large collection of medieval badges that were collected in the 19th century by children, whom the local antiquarian would pay for their finds. It has been suggested that this is because medieval pilgrims believed that the badges would bring good luck if they were thrown into water, however that theory is now contested. Many of the pilgrim badges in the collection of Salisbury Museum were found when the town's medieval sewers were excavated. This, among other evidence, suggests they were eventually just thrown away.

== Modern Use ==
A scallop shell symbol is used to mark the route of the Camino de Santiago, whilst the practice of collecting and wearing a shell continues.

Pilgrims walking with Student Cross wear a red fabric cross, along with carrying a wooden one.

== Imagery ==
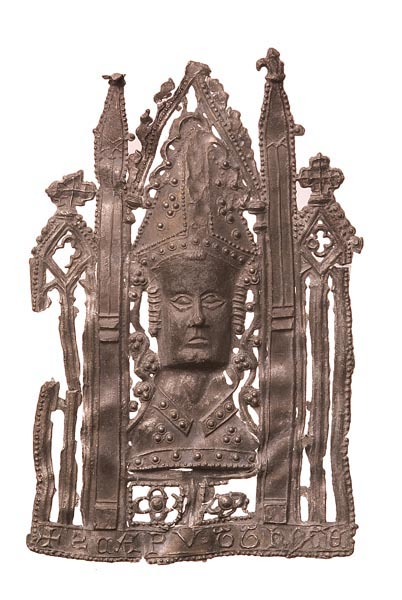
This badge represents the ornate head reliquary of St Thomas Becket and was probably sold near his shrine in Canterbury

Studying the imagery of pilgrim badges quickly leads to an ability to identify the shrine or saint associated with them. For example, St Thomas of Canterbury is often shown being martyred by one of a group of four knights. The iconography of the scallop shell associated with pilgrimages along the Way of St James to the shrine of Saint James at Santiago de Compostela in modern Spain derived from shells collected by pilgrims on the beach. The relic of St John the Baptist's head, which was famously venerated at Amiens, is shown as a face on a plate. The images are frequently related to iconographic types found on monumental artwork, showing how mobile iconographies were across media and social spheres.

Badges were made in the Middle Ages for purposes beyond pilgrim souvenirs; livery badges were presented to employees and allies by great figures, and became highly controversial in the decades leading to the Wars of the Roses. Some political badges have survived, including a fine one for the Black Prince. Other badges, with motifs such as lovers' tokens and mini brooches, were perhaps a form of cheap jewelry. Erotic badges showing winged phalluses or vulvas dressed as pilgrims are prolific, although their cultural significance is still debated.

In England the tradition of making and wearing pilgrim badges died out in the early 16th century as pilgrimage initially declined in popularity and was then banned completely as the country became Anglican during the English Reformation, when pilgrimage became regarded as a superstition and idolatrous; this halt on the practice was only temporary, as the practice of Christian pilgrimage once again became popular among Anglicans. The tradition continued in Catholic Europe, in some cases to the present day. Those of other branches of Christianity, such as Lutherans and the Reformed, also continue the practice of Christian pilgrimage, going to places such as the Holy Land, Iona Abbey, and Taizé.

== See also ==
- Lourdes water
- Pilgrim's hat
- Pilgrim's staff
- Shell of Saint James
