= Pilgrim's hat =

Hat used by pilgrims on the Way of St. James

The shield of Gossel, Germany features Saint James wearing a pilgrim's hat with the scallop shell on the front brim

A pilgrim's hat, cockel hat or traveller's hat is a wide-brimmed hat used to keep off the sun.

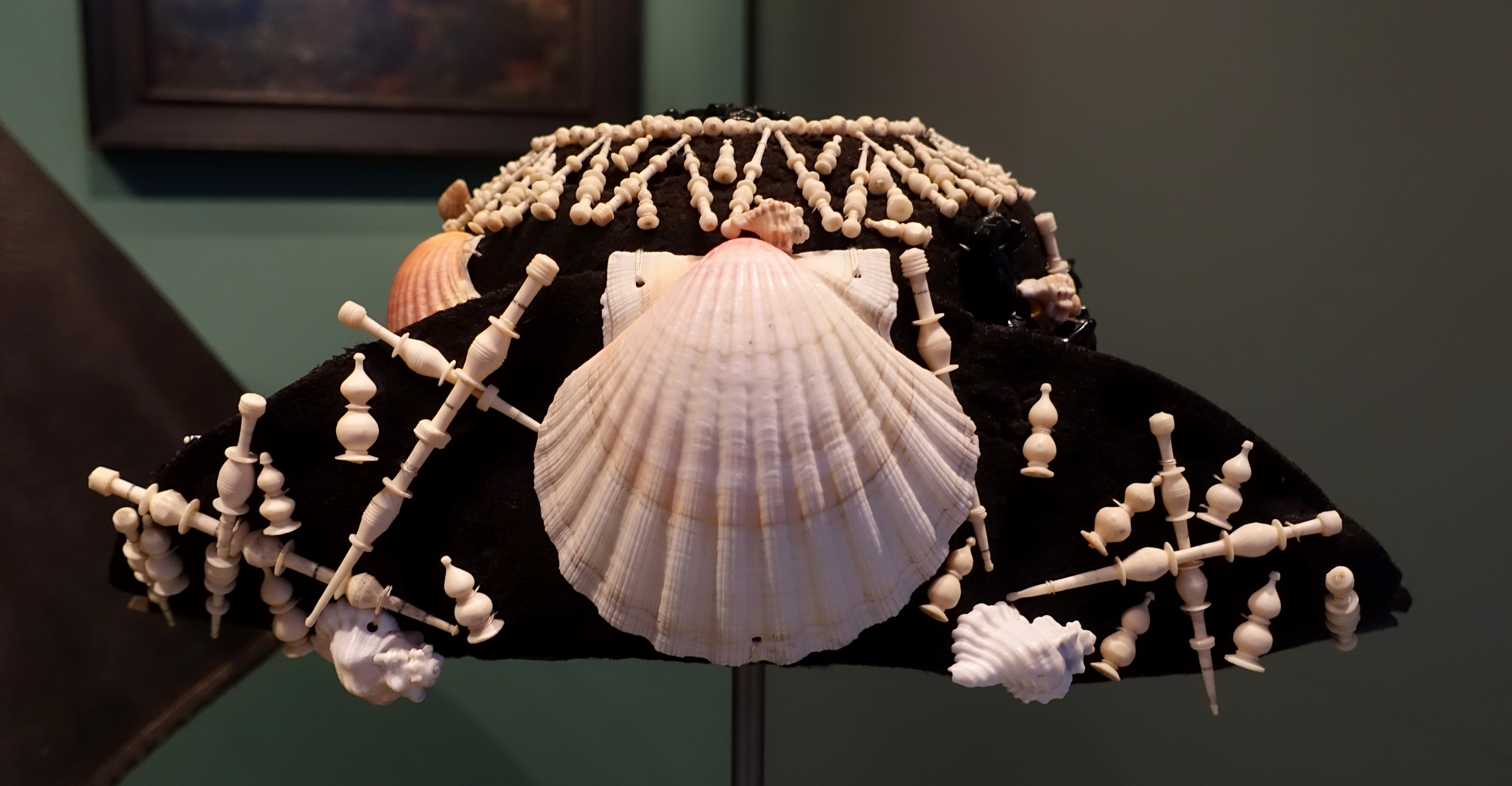
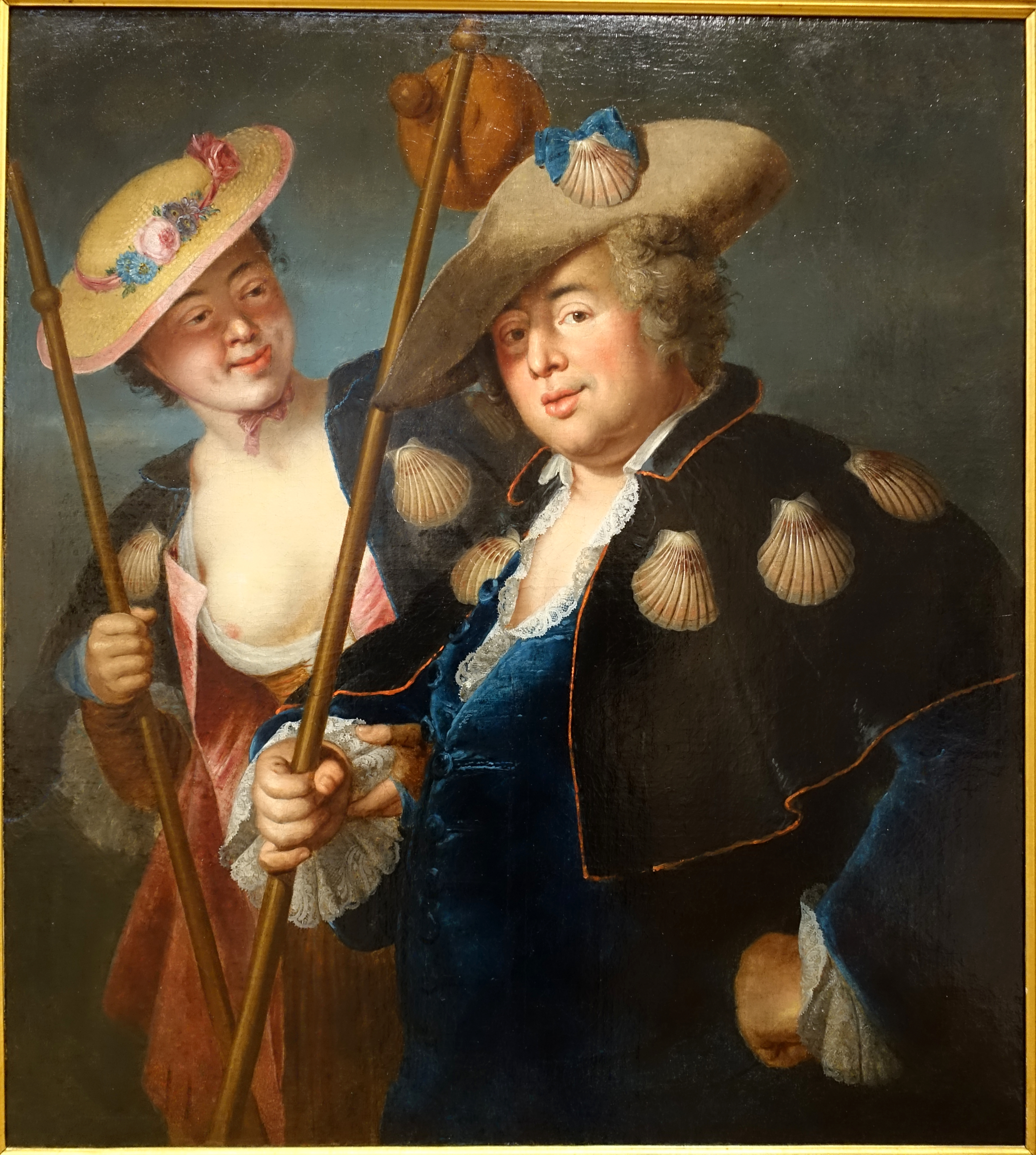
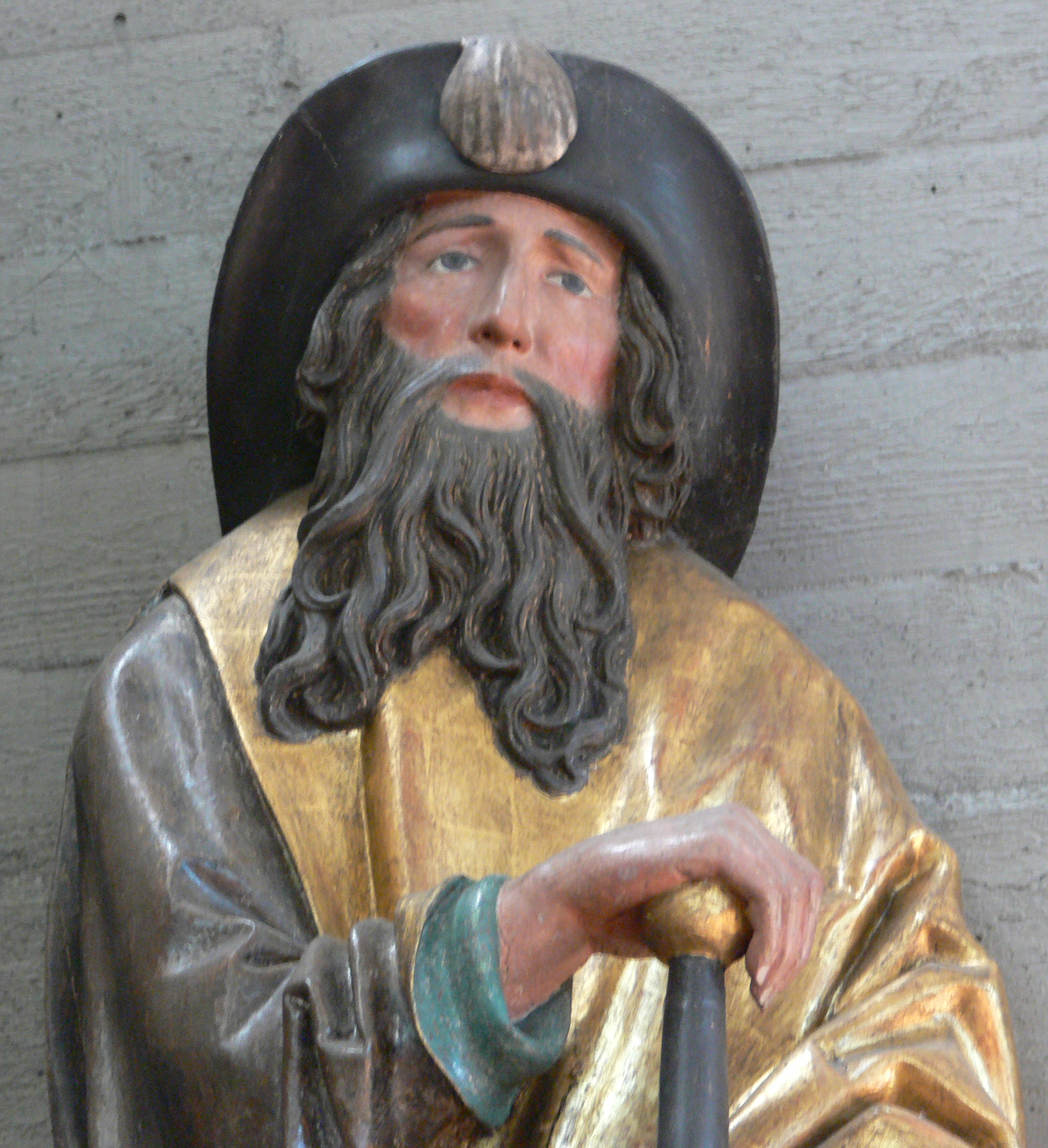
Examples of pilgrim's hats with scallops on them.

== Background ==
The pilgrim's hat traditionally had a scallop shell emblem. This is thought to be a reference to the Christian legend that, after Saint James died in Jerusalem, he was miraculously carried by angels to the Atlantic coast of Spain, although the shell symbol has also been connected to pre-Christian traditions as well.

Traditionally it is highly associated with pilgrims on the Way of St. James. The upturned brim of the hat is adorned with a scallop shell to denote the traveller's pilgrim status, although modern walkers wear it much less.

Pilgrim's hats occasionally appear in heraldry, oftentimes alongside pilgrim's staffs.

== See also ==
- List of hat styles
- Cross of Saint James
- Pilgrim badge
- Pilgrim's staff
