= Buddy Christ =

Parody religious icon

Buddy Christ

Buddy Christ is a parody religious icon created by filmmaker Kevin Smith, which first appeared in Smith's 1999 film Dogma.

In the film, Buddy is part of a campaign entitled "Catholicism Wow!" to renew the interest in the Catholic Church. Viewing the crucifix image as "wholly depressing", the Church, led by Cardinal Glick, played by George Carlin, decides to retire it, and creates Buddy Christ as a more uplifting image of Jesus Christ. The icon consists of a statue of Jesus, smiling and winking while pointing at onlookers with one hand and giving the thumbs-up sign with the other hand. Buddy Christ was later produced as an action figure and a bobblehead. The image has since been turned into a popular Internet meme.

The prop was used as a decoration in Smith's Red Bank, New Jersey, comics shop, Jay and Silent Bob's Secret Stash.

== See also ==
- Cultural depictions of Jesus
- List of statues of Jesus
- Tiny Jesus
- Luce (mascot), a real-world youth-oriented mascot commissioned by the Vatican that has been compared to Buddy Christ
