= Hard Candy (cosmetics) =

American cosmetics company

- Founded: 1995
- Headquarters: USA
- Key people: Dineh Mohajer; Benjamin A. Einstein; Reuben A. Einstein; Pooneh Mohajer
- Products: cosmetics
- Website: http://www.hardcandy.com

Hard Candy is an American cosmetics company, founded in 1995 by Iranian-American sisters Dineh Mohajer and Pooneh Mohajer (who now owns tokidoki), along with Dineh's ex-boyfriend Ben Einstein (who now owns Einstein Cosmetics) and his brother Reuben Einstein. The company's first product was nail polish that Dineh mixed herself - a shade of baby blue named "Sky" to match her Charles David sandals. After receiving scores of compliments on the unique shade, Dineh began selling it at Fred Segal in Santa Monica, and Ben began selling to many other top retailers including Nordstrom. In that same year, actress Alicia Silverstone appeared on the Late Show with David Letterman and, when asked about her pastel blue fingernails, replied, "It's sky blue," causing an overnight explosion of the brand. Ben and Dineh appeared on segments of MTV House of Style program several times. A mere 18 months later, the brand was quoted as generating $10 million a year in a Forbes advertisement featuring Dineh.

Louis Vuitton Moët Hennessy (LVMH), who owns Donna Karan, Givenchy, Sephora, TAG Heuer, and Veuve Clicquot, acquired Hard Candy in 1999 for an undisclosed amount. The acquisition afforded Hard Candy greater distribution and a larger brand to attach itself to. It was later sold to Falic Fashion Group, a Hollywood, Florida-based corporation operating on the duty-free market, and a subsidiary of Duty Free America. In 2009, Hard Candy announced a partnership with Wal-Mart to take the brand to mass.

NuWorld Beauty and Wal-Mart have worked together for over a year on the marketing concept, product creation, and package development of Hard Candy.

Hard Candy's new line, which premiered in the fall of 2009, consists of 261 products. The company kept some of the original Hard Candy products, among them their iconic nail polish, and introduced new products, such as Kaleyedescope Baked Eyeshadow, Eye Tattoo, Press-On Eyeshadow, and Take Me Out Eyeliner, which doubles as a hair stick.
