= The Coastland Times =

- Founder: Daniel Victor Meekins
- Publisher: Outer Banks Newsmedia
- Founded: July 5, 1935; 90 years ago
- Language: English
- Headquarters: Manteo, North Carolina
- Circulation: 5,000
- ISSN: 1069-4722
- OCLC number: 13142070
- Website: www.thecoastlandtimes.com

The Coastland Times is a newspaper serving the Outer Banks region of Eastern North Carolina, which specifically consists of Dare, Currituck, Hyde, and Tyrrell counties. It is published twice each week, and has a printed circulation of 5,000 copies, according to its website.

== History ==
The paper was established in 1935, originally as The Dare County Times, by Manteo, North Carolina native Daniel Victor Meekins and his wife, Catherine Deaton Meekins. Victor Meekins changed the paper's name to The Coastland Times in 1947. Meekins changed its name again in 1959, this time to The Coastland Times With Which Is Combined the Pilot and Herald of Belhaven and Swan Quarter. Meekins died in 1964, and in 1973, his family changed the name back to The Coastland Times. The Meekins family, including Victor Meekins' sons Roger Preston Meekins and Francis Warren Meekins, retained control over the paper until selling it to Outer Banks Newsmedia in December 2017.
