= Jeep ducking =

Phenomenon among Jeep owners

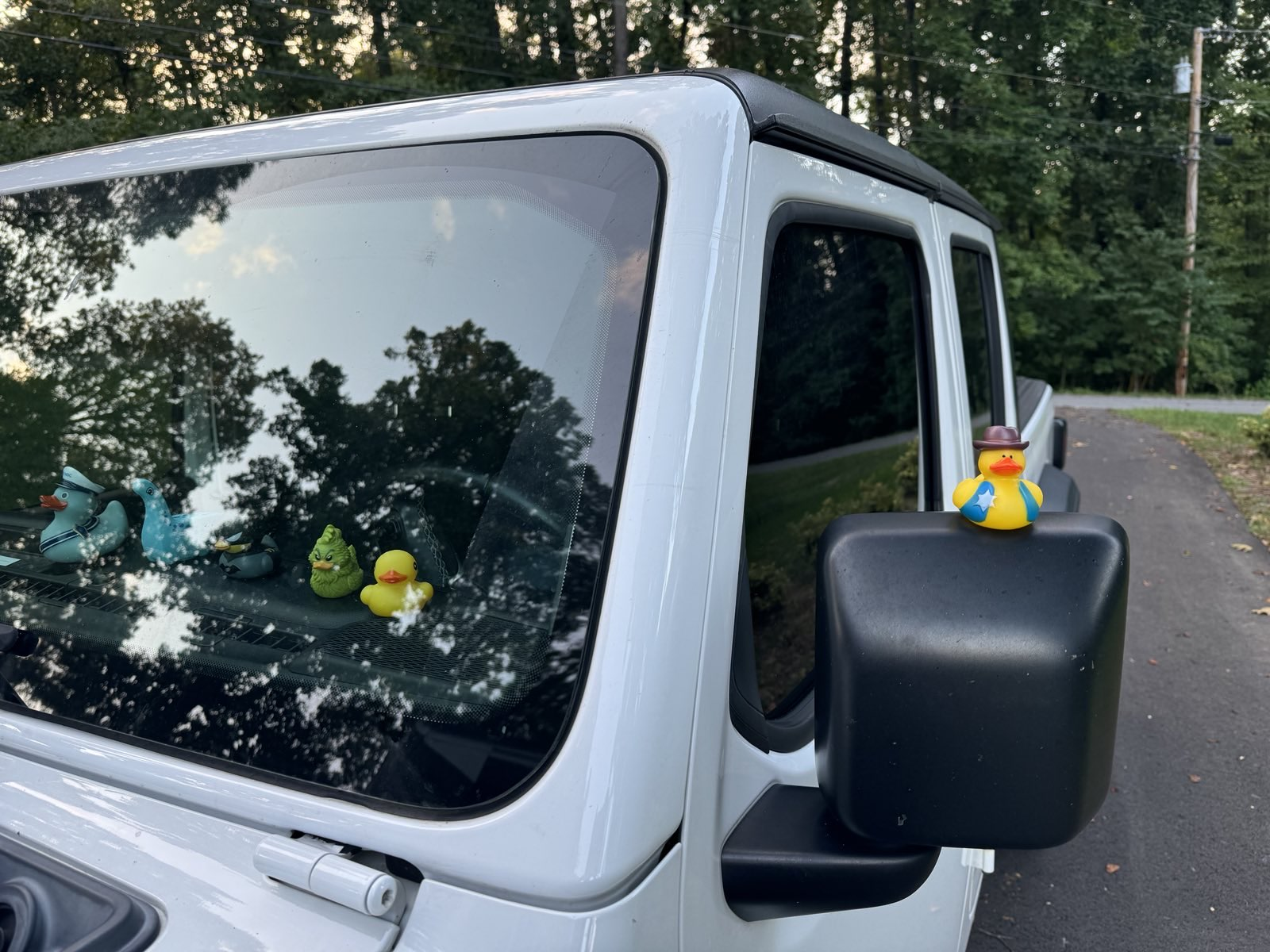
A white Jeep with a duck on a side mirror, and more ducks visible through the windshield

Jeep ducking, also known as Duck Duck Jeep, is a custom among owners of Jeep vehicles in which they leave rubber ducks on other Jeeps, originally Wranglers, but now including all Jeep models.

== History ==
The origins of the gesture have been attributed to Allison Parliament, a Canadian resident of Alabama. In 2020, during the early days of the COVID-19 pandemic, she had purchased rubber ducks to hide at a Canadian friend's house as a way to thank that friend for letting her visit. After having an unpleasant interaction with another person in the parking lot of a convenience store, she stated that she felt inspired to leave one of the ducks on a Jeep in the store parking lot with a simple note stating "nice Jeep" as an act of kindness. The owner of that Jeep saw Parliament place the duck and suggested that she make a social media post. Parliament made a post, which then went viral and popularized the action of "ducking."

In 2022, it was estimated that Jeep ducking Facebook groups had around half a million members. By 2023, it had become common to see rubber ducks on the dashboard of Jeeps. Some owners only perform the gesture on certain more classic Jeep models, with some limiting it to the Jeep Wrangler model, while others are less selective. Ducking a Jeep is considered a random act of kindness; however, not all Jeep owners are enthusiastic about the practice, because most feel it is a Jeep Wrangler "thing". Drivers who are ducked use the hashtag #DuckDuckJeep to post to social media. Typically, "ducking" one's own Jeep is frowned upon by other owners as this undermines the purpose, which was to be "ducked" out of an act of kindness.

=== Similar trends ===
A similar "Moo Moo Subaru" movement Facebook group launched in June 2023, aimed at promoting imitating the gesture with rubber cows on Subarus, garnering 36,000 members in six months. Owners of Mini vehicles engage in the practice of ducking as well, and some Chevrolet owners have developed "sharking". Other copycat trends include "yoda yoda Toyota" and "buck buck Bronco".

Stellantis, the manufacturer of Jeep, rented the World's Largest Rubber Duck for the 2022 North American International Auto Show in celebration of ducking, displaying it outside the Huntington Place convention center.

Allison Parliament's mother announced on Facebook that she had died unexpectedly of natural causes on June 22, 2024.

== Philanthropy ==
Duck-themed fundraisers by Jeep owners have raised money for veterans, hearing centers, and St. Jude Children's Research Hospital. BFGoodrich hosted a sweepstakes in which they pledged ten cents to Allison Parliament's "Ducking for Teachers" for every entry. One hospital has utilized a Jeep toy electric car, complete with a duck on the hood, to help put children at ease before surgery.
