= Dogma (film) =

1999 fantasy comedy film by Kevin Smith

- Theatrical release poster
- Directed by: Kevin Smith
- Written by: Kevin Smith
- Produced by: Scott Mosier
- Starring: Ben Affleck; Matt Damon; Linda Fiorentino; Salma Hayek; Jason Lee; Jason Mewes; Alan Rickman; Chris Rock
- Cinematography: Robert Yeoman
- Edited by: Kevin Smith; Scott Mosier
- Music by: Howard Shore
- Production company: View Askew Productions
- Distributed by: Lions Gate Films
- Release dates: May 21, 1999 (Cannes); November 12, 1999 (United States)
- Running time: 128 minutes
- Country: United States
- Language: English
- Budget: $10 million
- Box office: $45 million

Dogma is a 1999 American fantasy comedy film written, co-edited, and directed by Kevin Smith. The film stars Ben Affleck, Matt Damon, Linda Fiorentino, Salma Hayek, Jason Lee, Jason Mewes, Alan Rickman, and Chris Rock. It is the fourth film in the View Askewniverse.

The story revolves around two fallen angels who plan to employ an alleged loophole in Catholic dogma to return to Heaven after being cast out by God, but as existence is founded on the principle that God is infallible, their success would prove God wrong, thus undoing all creation. The last descendant of Jesus Christ and two prophets are sent by the angel Metatron to stop them.

Dogma screened out of competition at the 1999 Cannes Film Festival on May 21, 1999, and was released in the United States on November 12 by Lions Gate Films. The film's irreverent treatment of Catholicism and the Catholic Church triggered considerable controversy, even before its opening. The Catholic League denounced it as blasphemy. Organized protests delayed its release in many countries and led to at least two death threats against Smith. Despite this, Dogma received generally positive reviews from critics, and grossed $45 million against its $10 million budget, becoming the highest-grossing film in the View Askewniverse series to date.

== Plot ==
Bartleby and Loki are fallen angels, eternally banished from Heaven to Wisconsin for insubordination, after an inebriated Loki resigned as the Angel of Death at Bartleby's suggestion. In a newspaper article that arrives anonymously, the angels discover a way home: Cardinal Ignatius Glick is rededicating his church in Red Bank, New Jersey, in the image of the "Buddy Christ." Anyone who enters the church during the rededication festivities will receive a plenary indulgence, remitting all sins. Were the banished angels to undergo this rite—and then die after transmuting into human form—God would have no choice but to allow them re-entry into Heaven. They are encouraged by the demon Azrael and the Stygian triplets, three teenage hoodlums who serve Azrael in hell.

Bethany Sloane, a despondent abortion clinic counselor, attends a service at her church in McHenry, Illinois. Donations are solicited for a campaign to stop a Red Bank hospital from disconnecting life support on John Doe Jersey, a homeless man who was beaten into a coma by the triplets. Metatron—a seraph, and the voice of God—appears to Bethany in a pillar of fire and explains that if Bartleby and Loki succeed in re-entering Heaven, they will overrule the word of God, disprove the fundamental concept of God's omnipotence, and nullify all of existence. Bethany, aided by two prophets, must stop the angels and save the universe.

Now a target, Bethany is attacked by the triplets, who are driven off by the two foretold prophets, drug-dealing stoners Jay and Silent Bob. Bethany and the prophets are joined by Rufus, the 13th apostle, and Serendipity, the Muse of creative inspiration, who now works at a strip club in search of inspiration of her own. Azrael summons the Golgothan, a vile creature made of human excrement, but Bob immobilizes it with aerosol air freshener.

On a train to Red Bank, a drunken Bethany reveals her mission to Bartleby, who tries to kill her; Bob throws the angels off the train. Bartleby and Loki now realize the consequences of their scheme; Loki wants no part of destroying all existence, but Bartleby remains angry at God for his expulsion, and for granting free will to humans while demanding servitude from angels, and resolves to proceed.

In Red Bank, Bethany asks why she has been called upon to save the universe; why can't God simply do it itself? Metatron admits that God's whereabouts are unknown; it disappeared while visiting New Jersey in human form to play skee ball. The task falls to Bethany because—she now learns—she is the last scion, a distant but direct blood relative of Jesus.

The group cannot persuade Glick to cancel the celebration. Jay steals one of Glick's golf clubs. Their only remaining option is to keep the angels out of the church, but Azrael and the triplets trap them in a bar to prevent them from doing so. Azrael reveals that he sent the news clipping to the angels; he would rather end all existence than spend eternity in Hell. Bob kills Azrael with the golf club, which Glick had blessed to improve his game. Bethany blesses the bar sink's contents, and the others drown the triplets in the holy water. They race to the church, where Bartleby has killed Glick, his parishioners, and assorted bystanders. When Loki (who is now wingless and therefore mortal, with a conscience) attempts to stop him, Bartleby kills him as well.

All appears lost; Jay attempts to seduce Bethany before all existence ends. When he mentions John Doe Jersey, Bethany finally puts all the clues together. She and Bob race across the street to the hospital, as the others try to keep Bartleby from entering the church. But in doing so, Jay destroys his wings with automatic gunfire, making him mortal as well. Her faith restored, Bethany disconnects John's life support, liberating God, but killing herself. Bartleby reaches the church entrance where he confronts God, manifested in female form, who annihilates him with its voice. Bob arrives with Bethany's lifeless body; God resurrects her and conceives a child—the new last scion—within her womb. God, Metatron, Rufus, and Serendipity return to Heaven, leaving Bethany, Jay, and Silent Bob to reflect on the past and the future.

== Cast ==
- Ben Affleck as Bartleby
- Matt Damon as Loki
- Linda Fiorentino as Bethany Sloane
- Salma Hayek as Serendipity
- Jason Lee as Azrael
- Jason Mewes as Jay
- Alan Rickman as Metatron
- Chris Rock as Rufus (the Thirteenth Apostle)
- Kevin Smith as Silent Bob
- George Carlin as Cardinal Ignatius Glick
- Bud Cort as John Doe Jersey/God
- Alanis Morissette as God
- Janeane Garofalo as Liz
- Betty Aberlin as Nun
- Barret Hackney, Jared Pfennigwerth, and Kitao Sakurai as the Stygian Triplets

== Production ==
=== Development ===
On October 25, 2000, Kevin Smith wrote an essay titled In the Beginning... The Story of Dogma, which details the history and genesis of how Dogma came to be. His essay is available on the Dogma 2-disc Special Edition DVD.

Before Smith began writing Clerks, he began noting down ideas for a film called God. During his brief period in film school, he essentially wrote the scene introducing Rufus, but this version did not feature Jay and Silent Bob. During the development of Clerks, Smith continued to jot down ideas for his God project, including having the main character be a high school jock, the conception of 13th Apostle, Rufus, and a muse named Serendipity; but, Smith didn't have a story to work off of.

By the time Clerks had been picked up for distribution, Smith began writing the first draft for the film. He felt calling the project God was inappropriate, and retitled it Dogma. The first draft was completed in August 1994, with 148 pages accomplished, and more additions; the high school protagonist was changed to a stripper named Bethany who meets Jay and Silent Bob at a nudie booth, Azrael (or known throughout the script as the "Shadowy Figure") was introduced in the final 30 pages, and Bethany blew up the church in order to not let Bartleby and Loki pass through the archway. After Smith and Clerks producer Scott Mosier reread the draft, they decided that they didn't want Dogma to be their sophomore film; they didn't want to tackle a bigger scale picture until they felt ready to do it. Despite including the line "Jay and Silent Bob will return in Dogma" at the end of Clerks, Smith moved to Universal Studios in order to develop his next film, Mallrats.

During Mallrats' production, Smith revisited the Dogma script and made some changes; Bethany's job went from stripper to an abortion clinic and included an orangutan for Jay and Silent Bob to hang out with. In 1996, he dropped the orangutan and reworked Bethany to be played by his then-girlfriend Joey Lauren Adams. During that time, he was writing Chasing Amy and got Ben Affleck to agree to be in both projects. After Chasing Amy was released to critical and box-office success, Smith felt confident enough to make Dogma.

=== Visual effects ===
Smith and Mosier assembled a group of visual artists to realize their concept of a surreal, abstract environment "somewhere between reality and unreality": production designer Robert Holtzman, special effects supervisor Charles Belardinelli, creature effects supervisor Vincent Guastini, costume designer Abigail Murray, and director of photography Robert Yeoman.

=== Locations ===
Principal filming took place from March to June 1998. The triplets' attack on John Doe Jersey was filmed on the boardwalk in Asbury Park, New Jersey; all other scenes were shot in and around Pittsburgh, Pennsylvania. The Mexican restaurant in which Metatron explains Bethany's mission was the Franklin Inn in Franklin Park, north of Pittsburgh. Serendipity's pole dance and the Golgothan confrontation took place at the Park View Cafe (since renamed Crazy Mocha and later Yinz Coffee) on East North Avenue in Pittsburgh. The heroes plan their final strategy in the Grand Concourse Restaurant in the restored Pittsburgh and Lake Erie Railroad Station. St Michael's Church, site of the apocalyptic climax, is the Saints Peter and Paul Church—currently vacant—in East Liberty.

=== Casting ===
Jason Lee was initially attached to play Loki. When that role went to Matt Damon, due to his onscreen chemistry with Affleck in Good Will Hunting, Lee received the Azrael role due to scheduling conflicts with filming Mumford. Smith envisioned Samuel L. Jackson as Rufus, but was convinced to hire Chris Rock after meeting him. Alan Rickman was recruited to play Metatron. Albert Brooks was offered the role of Cardinal Glick, but turned it down. Emma Thompson was originally attached to play God, but had to withdraw when she became pregnant. Smith — a fan of The X-Files — offered the role of Bethany to Gillian Anderson, but "heard back that she really hated it."

Critics expressed surprise at the film's eclectic casting, which Smith said was done deliberately to emphasize contrasts between characters — Rickman as the powerful Metatron, for example, opposite Mewes as the hopelessly verbose stoner Jay, "... a Shakespearean trained actor of the highest order next to a dude from New Jersey." Smith warned Mewes that he would have to take his acting to a higher level. "I really impressed upon him that he had to be prepared for this movie. 'There are real actors in this one,' we kept telling him." In response, Mewes memorized not only his own dialogue but the entire screenplay, because he "didn't want to piss off that Rickman dude".

Other unorthodox casting decisions included George Carlin, who had made his atheism a cornerstone of his public image, as a Catholic priest; Mexican actress Salma Hayek as Serendipity — "the [Muse] who throughout history inspired all the geniuses of art and music, like Mozart and Michelangelo, and never got any of the credit" — and singer-songwriter Alanis Morissette as God. "There's a Zen Buddhist serenity to Alanis that calls to mind something otherworldly," Smith explained. "She's definitely ethereal in nature, even when not speaking, and she carries an air about her that played into the role."

It was rumored in the years following the film’s release that Fiorentino and Smith did not get along during the filming. Smith stated that rumors of a falling out between the two had been misconstrued and overstated, and that while the two hadn’t spoken in years, they amicably reconnected following his near fatal heart attack. He attributed the rumors to a careless comment: “ I remember on a commentary track on the DVD — Janeane Garofalo was in the movie and at one point I said it would have better if she played the lead, which was a really shitty and stupid thing to say. Thoughtless, considering that Linda was the lead and Linda did a great job. So it had been years since I had spoken with Linda and I got an email from her. And of course I was thankful to hear from her and it also gave me a chance to say I’m so sorry that I ever said that thing years ago. It gives you a chance to make amends. So that was my favorite one. I heard from so many people, but that one really stood out for me because, if somebody had said, ‘Oh, the movie would have been better if Ben Affleck directed it,’ that would have hurt my feelings. I know it hurt her feelings and really unnecessarily because I always loved her performance in the movie.”

=== Deleted scenes ===
On the film's official website, Smith described a scene that did not make the final cut: a climactic face-off in the hospital between Silent Bob, a badly burned and half-decomposed triplet, and the Golgothan. The battle was to end with the triplet killing Bethany (temporarily), and God, newly liberated, transforming the Golgothan into flowers. Test audiences felt the scene had "too much Golgothan", and the film's run time already exceeded two hours, so the scene was eliminated.

Another deleted scene has come to be known as the "Fat Albert sequence". In the strip club, a gang (led by Dwight Ewell) grows jealous that the stripper is paying more attention to Jay & Silent Bob than to them. The gang confronts them and draws guns. Jay & Silent Bob then defuse the situation by taking to the stage and performing the theme song from Fat Albert. Rufus realizes that the stripper is the muse Serendipity, and she actually deescalated things by giving Jay & Silent Bob the idea. The sequence was in the film when it screened at Cannes, but was removed before its general release. The scene gained notoriety as fans began speculating as to why it was removed. On the Dogma: Special Edition DVD, Smith said the feedback he received was that the scene ran too long and was not very funny.

== Release ==
Dogma was originally scheduled for a November 1998 release by Miramax Films, but due to controversy, the film was postponed for a 1999 release. Bob and Harvey Weinstein reportedly bought the rights to the film for $10–$14 million. The Weinsteins then sold the distribution rights to Lions Gate Films for the United States, although Miramax Films retained foreign distribution rights.

The film was screened but was not entered into competition at the 1999 Cannes Film Festival.

=== Home media and rights issues ===
Dogma was released on DVD and VHS by Columbia TriStar Home Video in May 2000. This was followed by a 2-disc special edition DVD in 2001 and a Blu-ray in 2008. A 37 minute documentary produced for the DVD, Judge Not: In Defense of Dogma, was not completed in time for the release and was instead included on the DVD release for the Smith-produced film Vulgar.

After going out of print on home media, Dogma was unavailable to stream or purchase digitally due to the rights being owned personally by Bob and Harvey Weinstein in a deal that predated the streaming era. In early 2020, after Harvey Weinstein was convicted and sentenced to 23 years' incarceration for rape, Smith reportedly contacted Bob Weinstein and offered $5 million to acquire the home video rights, but Bob refused. In 2022, while promoting the release of Clerks III, Smith publicly commented on his efforts to reacquire the rights to the film, claiming he had made two offers that were turned down, and quipped, "My movie about angels is owned by the devil himself."

In June 2024, at a Smodcastle Theater screening of Clerks: The Animated Series, Smith announced that the Weinsteins had finally sold the rights to the film, and later said in a podcast interview that he intended to re-release the film on home media and digital the following year, in addition to touring the film theatrically.

Iconic Events acquired rights to Dogma from Miramax, and re-released the film for its 25th anniversary on June 5, 2025. In anticipation, Smith embarked on a national tour on April 20, 2025, and hosted screenings in 25 cities with Q&A sessions. The film received a 4DX release in 4DX-equipped theaters on September 15, 2025.

On July 27, 2025, at San Diego Comic Con, Kevin Smith announced he licensed the home video rights to Lionsgate, the film's original theatrical distributor, for a 4K steelbook release as part of Lionsgate Limited. It was released on December 9, 2025.

== Soundtrack ==
Music from the Motion Picture Dogma

Soundtrack album to the film Dogma
- Released: November 2, 1999
- Recorded: Various
- Genre: Various
- Length: 40:36
- Label: Maverick

The soundtrack album accompanying the film was released in the United States on November 2, 1999, by Maverick Records. It features an orchestral score by Howard Shore, performed by the London Philharmonic Orchestra; and the song "Still", written, performed, and produced by Morissette. Stephen Thomas Erlewine of AllMusic described the "rich, effective" score as "alternately melodramatic and humorous".

Several songs used in the film do not appear on the soundtrack, including "Magic Moments" performed by Perry Como, "Candy Girl" by New Edition, "Alabamy Bound" performed by Ray Charles, and others. In one scene, Matt Damon's Loki recites the hook of the Run-DMC song "Run's House".

== Reception ==
=== Box office ===
Dogma was the third-highest-grossing film in its opening weekend, behind The Bone Collector and Pokémon: The First Movie, grossing $8.7 million. The film grossed a domestic total of $31.6 million from a $10 million budget. It remains the highest-grossing film in Smith's View Askewniverse series.

=== Critical response ===
On Rotten Tomatoes, Dogma has an approval rating of 71% based on 146 reviews, with an average rating of 6.4/10. The site's critical consensus reads, "Provocative and audacious, Dogma is an uneven but thoughtful religious satire that's both respectful and irreverent." On Metacritic, the film received a score of 62 out of 100, based on 36 critics, indicating "generally favorable reviews". Audiences polled by CinemaScore gave the film an average grade of "B" on an A+ to F scale. Roger Ebert of the Chicago Sun-Times awarded the film three-and-a-half stars (out of four).

Some religious groups—in particular the activist Catholic League—denounced the film as blasphemous. Other groups staged protests outside theaters screening the film. Director Kevin Smith himself attended one of these protests, pretending to be opposed to the movie. Roger Ebert noted that no official objection came from the Catholic Church itself; he wrote: "We are actually free in this country to disagree about religion, and blasphemy is not a crime."

=== Accolades ===
Year	Award	Category	Nominee(s)	Result
1999	The Stinkers Bad Movie Awards	Musicians Who Shouldn't Be Acting	Alanis Morissette	Nominated
2000	Satellite Awards	Best Performance by an Actor in a Supporting Role, Comedy or Musical	Alan Rickman	Nominated
2000	Satellite Awards	Best Original Song: "Still"	Alanis Morissette	Nominated
2000	Independent Spirit Awards	Best Screenplay	Kevin Smith	Nominated
2000	Las Vegas Film Critics Society Awards	Best Screenplay, Original	Kevin Smith	Nominated
2000	Golden Raspberry Awards	Worst Supporting Actress	Salma Hayek (sharing with Wild Wild West)	Nominated
2001	Nebula Award for Best Script	Best Script	Kevin Smith	Nominated
2001	Golden Schmoes Award	Best DVD of the Year	Dogma: Special Edition	Nominated

== Possible sequel ==
In late November 2005, Smith responded to talk of a possible sequel on the ViewAskew.com message boards:

So weird you should ask this, because ever since 9/11, I have been thinking about a sequel of sorts. I mean, the worst terrorist attack on American soil was religiously bent. In the wake of said attack, the leader of the "Free World" outed himself as pretty damned Christian. In the last election, rather than a quagmire war abroad, the big issue was whether or not gay marriage was moral. Back when I made Dogma, I always maintained that another movie about religion wouldn't be forthcoming, as Dogma was the product of 28 years of religious and spiritual meditation, and I'd kinda shot my wad on the subject. Now? I think I might have more to say. And, yes, the Last Scion would be at the epicenter of it. And she'd have to be played by Alanis. And we'd need a bigger budget, because the entire third act would be the Apocalypse. Scary thing is this: the film would have to touch on Islam. And unlike the Catholic League, when those cats don't like what you do, they issue a death warrant on your ass. And now that I've got a family, I'm not as free to stir the shit-pot as I was when I was single, back when I made Dogma. I mean, now I've gotta think about more than my own safety and well-being, but regardless – yeah, a Dogma follow-up's been swimming around in my head for some time now.

When asked about the sequel in October 2017, Smith said it would not happen, as he no longer desired to make any new religious films.

Near the same time as the cancellation, just weeks before the Weinstein scandal broke to the public, Harvey Weinstein pitched to Smith about doing a sequel. Not much came from this pitch, but it was just a mere idea for Weinstein. According to Smith in an interview with Business Insider, he recalls:

I said, 'Hey, how are you?' And he goes, 'You know, we have Dogma, I just realized, and we got to get it out there again.' I said, 'We do! People online are always asking where they can get it. And he then goes, 'You know, that movie had a big cast, we might even be able to do a sequel.' And I was like, 'Yeah man, right on. I might think about that.' And he was like, 'We'll talk.' And a week later, the New York Times story breaks. I felt sick to my stomach.

Smith believes that he only got the call because, "It was him looking to see who was a friend still because his life was about to shift completely."

Damon returned to reprise his role as a reborn Loki in Jay and Silent Bob Reboot. In a fourth-wall breaking monologue, he explains after the events of Dogma God once again banished him to Earth, this time to the Mediterranean Sea where he was rescued by Italian fishermen after getting amnesia, describing the plot of Damon's film The Bourne Identity: he remarks that would make his current form his "reborn identity".

While promoting Clerks III, Smith reiterated that Weinstein still owned Dogma, and tried to buy the film's rights back once he was assured the money would not go directly to Weinstein, who is currently imprisoned. Despite increasingly larger offers from Smith's camp and a letter sharing how personal Dogma was for him, their offers were denied by Weinstein's lawyer. Smith described the film as a movie that is "held hostage" and shared his wish to both tour the film as a re-release and to produce a sequel if he would get the rights back.

After buying back the film's rights, Smith stated in November 2024 he was brainstorming a Dogma sequel, with the hope that Matt Damon and Ben Affleck would make cameo appearances. Smith later clarified that while he at the very least intended to write a sequel script, he could not guarantee it would be made and had yet to reach out to Damon and Affleck. In December 2025, Smith revealed that he has Helen Mirren in mind for a replacement for Alan Rickman, who died in 2016, for the role of Metatron.

== See also ==
- List of films about angels
