= The Kindness Rocks Project =

Viral trend involving painted rocks

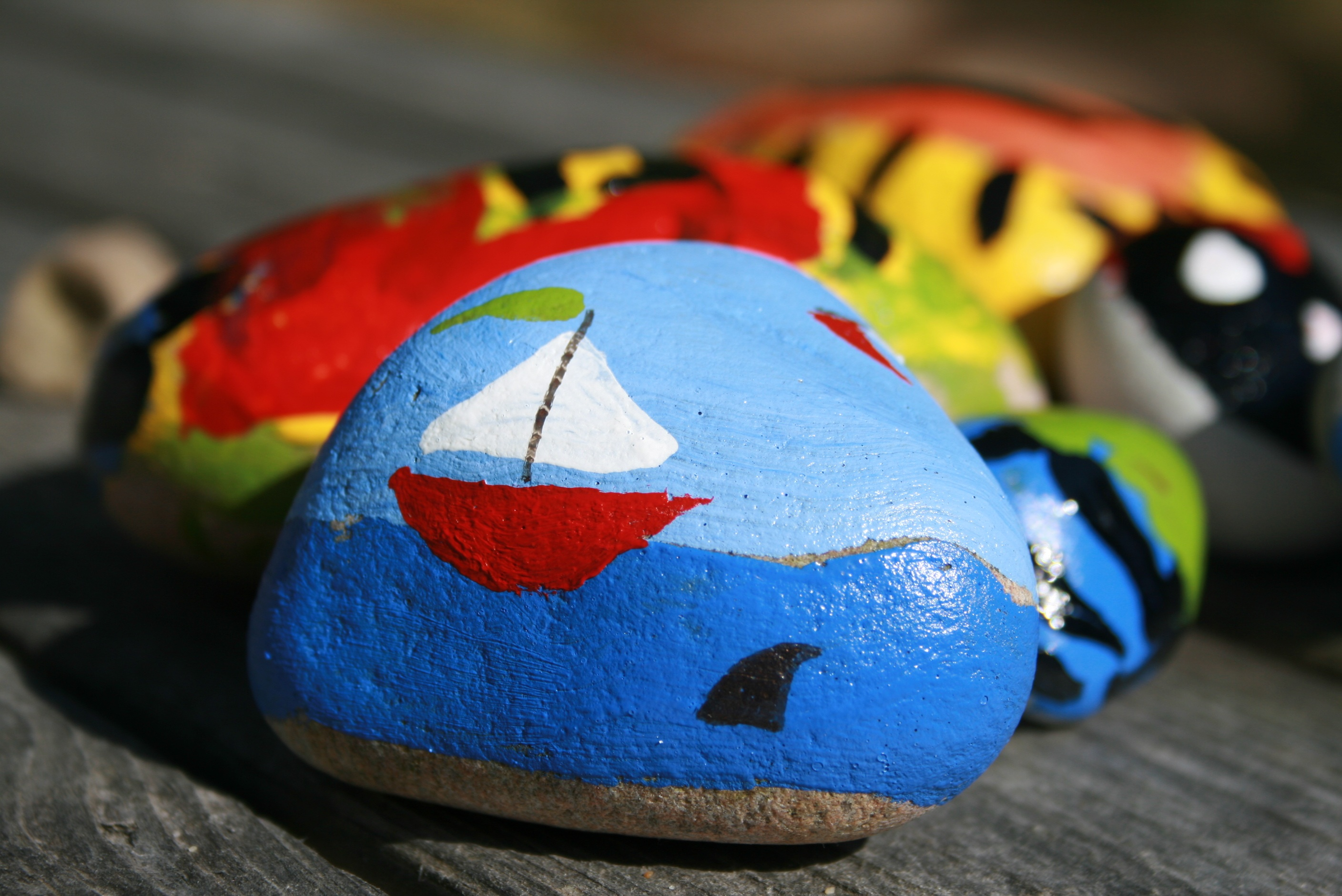
Painted stones, featuring one with a sailboat on the ocean and blue sky.

The Kindness Rocks Project is a viral trend where people, commonly children, paint pebbles or cobbles and leave them for others to find and collect. Photos of the painted rocks and hints of where to find them are commonly shared on Facebook groups. The trend originated in the U.S. and has spread to the other countries, including U.K., Australia, New Zealand, and Haiti.

Similar projects include happy stones and doodle stones, which are often grouped under the term Stoones as a collective term for traveling stones.

== Origin ==
The Kindness Rocks Project was started by Megan Murphy in 2015 on Cape Cod. She wrote "You've got this" on a rock and left it on a beach on Cape Cod. After a friend found it, she started leaving more rocks with inspirational messages behind.

Alice Brock, a Cape Cod resident who had been painting rock art since the 1960s, claimed credit for helping spread the phenomenon worldwide by sending painted rocks to her friends and family in New York City and Europe.

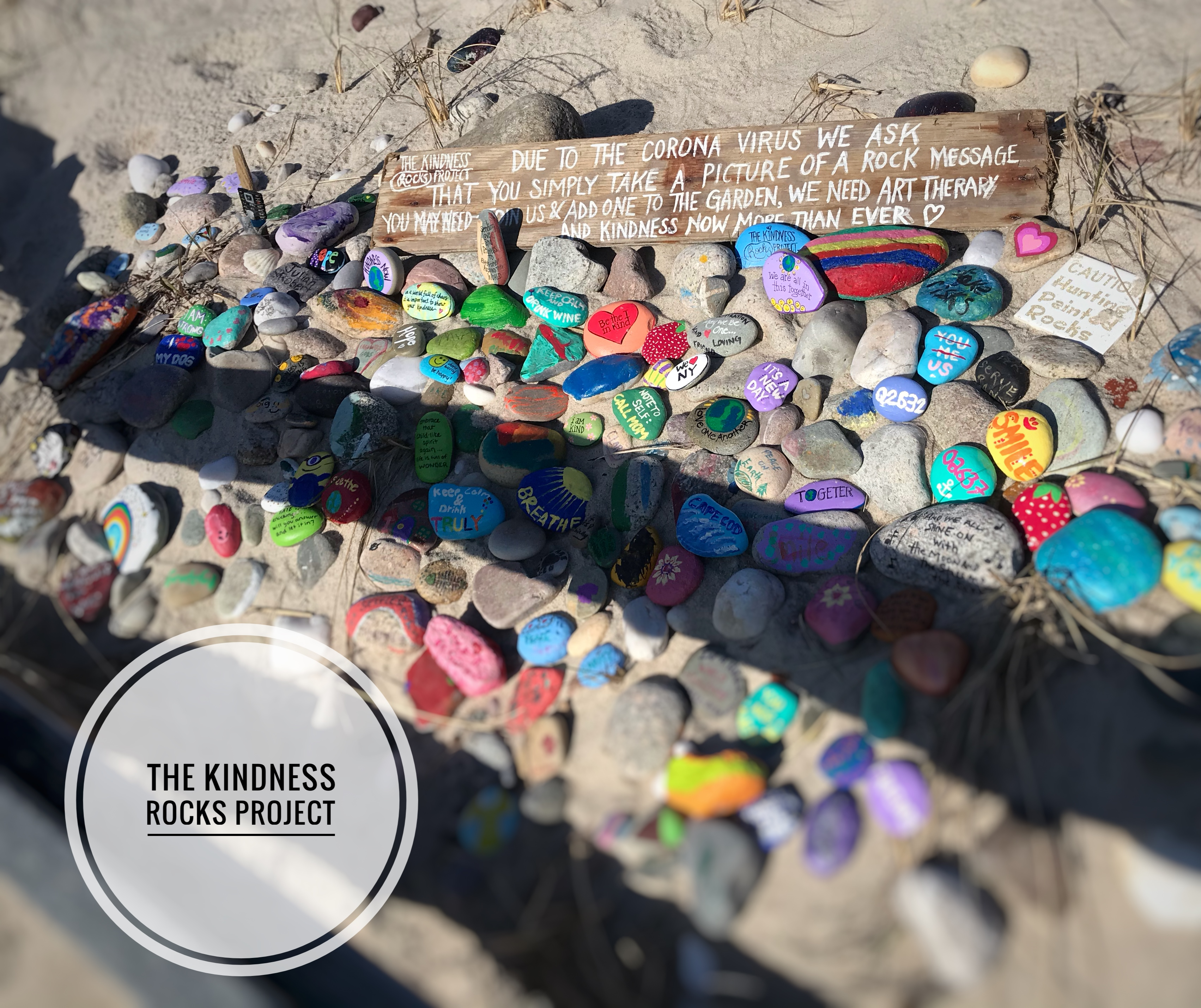

== Derivatives ==
As the trend of painting kindness rocks has spread, it has many derivatives but remains true to its original intention of spreading kindness. Rocks are painted as a social-emotional learning activity for kids, as well as to support particular charities, events or movements. Sometimes the name of a hashtag or the Facebook group the painter belongs to is written on it as well.

Generally, rocks which are hidden are intended to be picked up, photographed and put on Facebook, and then re-hidden in a different spot. However, different rock groups may have different ideas; some might be asked to be taken as far as possible, and others hidden in the same city or general region. The Kindness Rocks Project encourages people to set up community Inspiration gardens.

The painting rock trend was revived during the COVID-19 pandemic.

=== #Islastones ===
#Islastones was a rock-painting movement in support of Isla Tansey, a girl diagnosed with DIPG, a terminal cancer. Isla asked people to paint stones with the hashtag #islastones, take photos of them, and hide them. Isla died on July 10, 2018, at the age of 7, less than a year after her diagnosis.

== International Drop a Rock Day ==
International Drop a Rock Day is an unofficial holiday celebrated on July 3, in which people are encouraged to leave a painted rock in a public space.

== Reception and environmental concerns ==
Some parks have objected to people leaving painted rocks on their grounds, including the Texas Parks and Wildlife Department. Painted rocks were banned from several parks in the Marlborough region of New Zealand. Disneyland has banned painted rocks from entering the park and will confiscate them. These bans make reference to environmental and aesthetic clutter concerns that violate “leave no trace” policies.

Rocks painted with acrylic paints represent a source of acrylic plastic pollution. Acrylic plastic is not readily biodegradable.

== See also ==
- Kindness – Type of behaviour
- Rock art – Human-made markings on natural stone
