= Tokidoki =

Lifestyle brand by Simone Legno

tokidoki
- Type: Apparel brand
- Genre: Cute, kawaii, bright, Japanese
- Founded: 2005, in Los Angeles, California
- Founder: Simone Legno, Ivan Arnold, Pooneh Mohajer
- Headquarters: 5534 W. Washington Blvd., Los Angeles, California, 90016, United States
- Key people: Ivan Arnold, CEO; Simone Legno, CCO; Pooneh Mohajer, COO
- Products: apparel, toys, cosmetics
- Owner: tokidoki, LLC.
- Website: tokidoki.it

Tokidoki, (Note: 時々 'sometimes' in Japanese) doing business as tokidoki, is an American Japanese-inspired lifestyle brand, created in 2005 by Italian artist Simone Legno, and business partners Pooneh Mohajer and Ivan Arnold.

== History ==
=== Early history and founding ===
Simone Legno, a Rome-based Itatian artist who was fascinated with Japanese culture, launched a personal website called tokidoki.it in 2001 to share his artwork, as well as flash animations. The website gained traction, being listed as one of The Independent's “10 best sites of the week” on January 4, 2003. That same year, Pooneh Mohajer, the co-founder of cosmetics company Hard Candy, saw Legno's personal portfolio website, and became interested in creating merchandise of the characters Legno drew. They subsequently arranged to meet in Los Angeles, where they would continue to work together.

The pair would officially debut and register tokidoki as an apparel brand in 2005, utilizing assets from damnBRAND, an e-commerce firm founded by Mohajer. The brand would be promoted at various trade shows across the United States, such as MAGIC.

tokidoki would receive mainstream attention in 2005 after securing a deal with LeSportsac to design a print pattern and collectible charms for a limited run of purses, as well as t-shirts. This collaboration would garner tokidoki a large audience of consumers, and more collaborations with other lifestyle brands followed. By 2008, tokidoki was collaborating with Sanrio to design Hello Kitty merchandise.

== Iconography and style ==
Tokidoki’s company logo is a black heart atop black crossbones, a design choice made by Legno as "[t]here is dark and light, there is the edgy, there is the cute." Much of the company’s artwork and catalogue is heavily influenced by the style choices of Japanese pop culture cartoons and kitschy collectibles that are common in the Japanese consumer markets. While the company’s products superficially resemble Japanese anime and manga, some cultural researchers describe the products as a reciprocal exchange between the cultural and economic influences of Japan, the United States, and Italy, explaining its broad outreach and emotional appeal to consumers in Italy and other countries who grew up with Japanese anime and manga.

== Products ==
The brand has been used in numerous products, including apparel, footwear, and accessories based on the art, cartoon characters and logo designed by Legno. tokidoki also has multiple business projects and collaborations with global brands such as Hello Kitty, Bearbrick, Barbie, Marvel, Nissan, and Sephora. Tokidoki has collaborated with the German fashion designer Karl Lagerfeld for a range of collectible dolls and accessories.

Characters created by tokidoki include Cactus Friends, Donutella and Her Sweet Friends, Unicorno, Moofia, Mermicorno, Til Death, and Punkstar.
