= 2025 Jubilee =

Major event in the Catholic Church commemorating the year 2025

- The official logo of the 2025 Jubilee features its motto, with the Latin meaning Pilgrims of Hope.
- Native name: Iubilaeum A.D. MMXXV
- Date: 24 December 2024 – 6 January 2026
- Duration: 379 days
- Location: Worldwide
- Website: www.iubilaeum2025.va/en.html

The 2025 Jubilee was a jubilee in the Catholic Church celebrated in the year 2025, announced by Pope John Paul II at the end of the 2000 Great Jubilee. This jubilee was preceded by the Extraordinary Jubilee of Mercy of 2015–2016. Pope Francis' papal bull proclaiming the Jubilee was entitled Spes non confundit (Latin for "Hope does not disappoint").

It ran from Christmas Eve (24 December) 2024 to Epiphany (6 January) 2026.

== Preparation ==
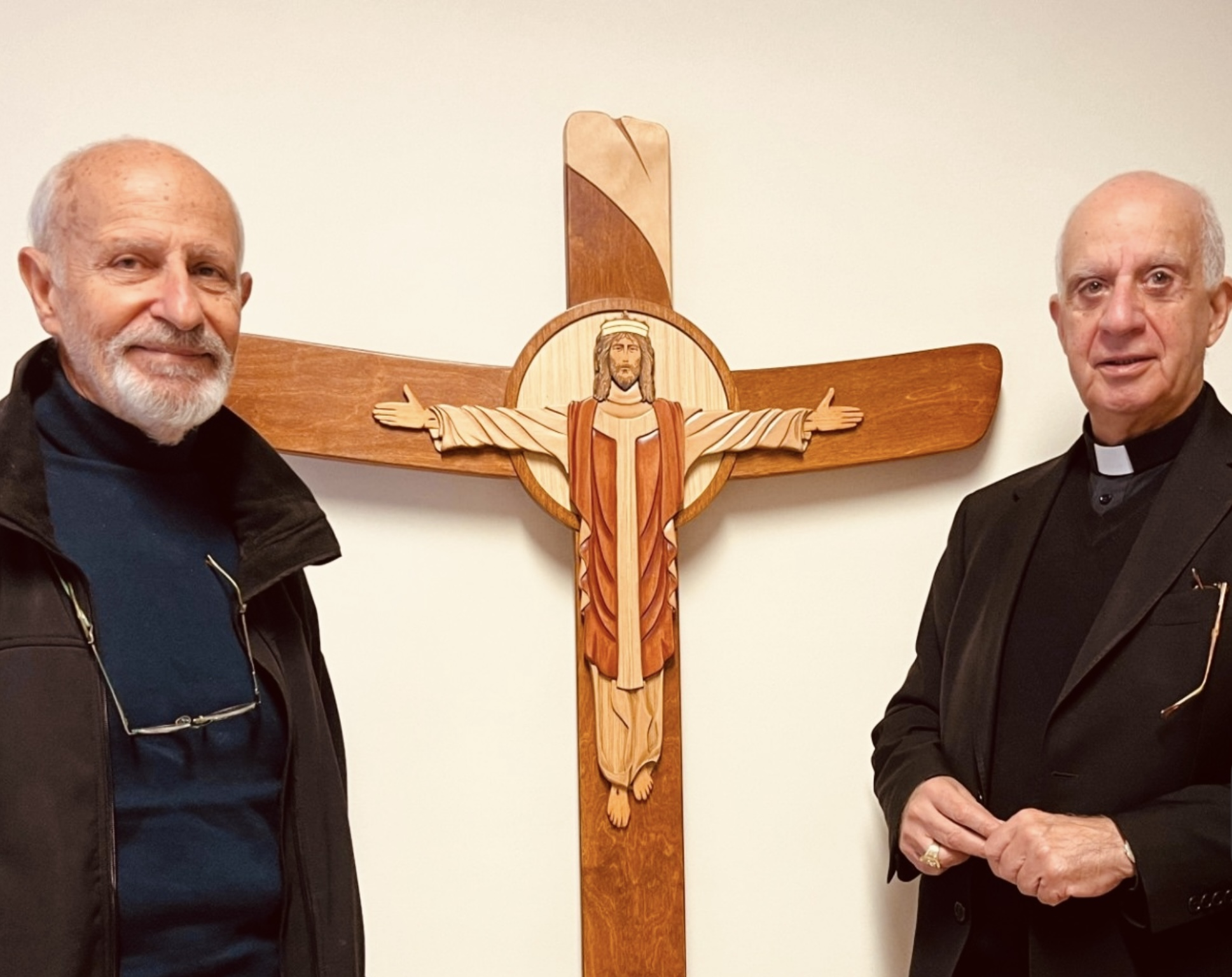
The 2025 Jubilee Cross designed by Riccardo Izzi

At the close of the 2000 Great Jubilee, Pope John Paul II spoke to the children of the world, noting that the children and young people of that time would be "the leading players at the next Jubilee in 2025". On 26 December 2021, Pope Francis entrusted the Pontifical Council for the Promotion of the New Evangelization with the task of making preparations for the Jubilee, since he considered it fundamental for the strengthening of Catholicism. On 3 January 2022, at a meeting held in Rome, it was determined that the motto of the event would be "Pilgrims of Hope". On 22 February the Pontifical Council for the Promotion of the New Evangelization called a competition to design the official logo of the 2025 Jubilee, with the main prompt being that the participants base their submissions on the motto. The Pontifical Council would choose the design which communicated the message the best. The competition was open until 20 May, and at the end of June 2022, the official logo was presented.

The papal bull of convocation, named Spes non confundit, took place 9 May 2024, coinciding with the Solemnity of the Ascension.

=== Media ===
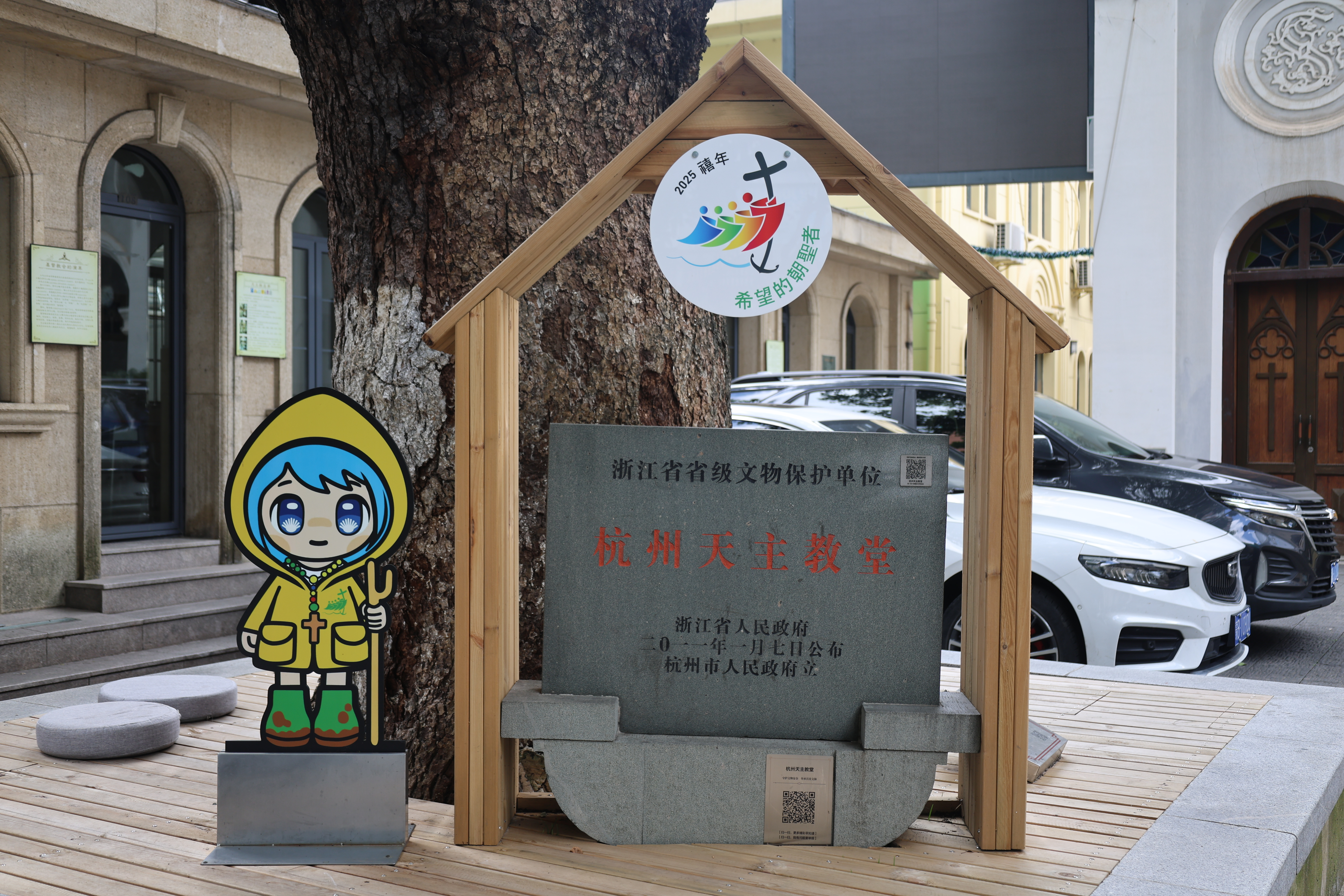
The logo of the 2025 Jubilee and the Luce mascot on display outside of the Cathedral of the Immaculate Conception in Hangzhou

The logo of the Jubilee depicts four people in "pilgrims' capes" following the Cross. They represent all humanity arriving from the four cardinal points. The figures embrace to represent the fraternity of all humanity. The Cross is held by the first person and represents the clinging to hope and faith. The people stand on waves, representing that the pilgrimage of life is not always smooth. The group of pilgrims also represents that the pilgrimage that is life is communal.

On 28 October 2024, the Vatican launched an anime-influenced mascot named "Luce" (Italian for "light") for the 2025 Jubilee, intending to engage a younger audience.

== Events ==
=== Holy Doors ===
Opening and closing of the Holy Doors of the four major papal basilicas in Rome, normally sealed with mortar and cement, signal the beginning and end of the jubilee:

Basilica	Opening date	Closing date	Image
St. Peter's Basilica in the Vatican	24 December 2024	6 January 2026	
St. John Lateran Basilica	29 December 2024	27 December 2025	
Basilica of Saint Mary Major	1 January 2025	25 December 2025	
Basilica of Saint Paul Outside the Walls	5 January 2025	28 December 2025	

=== Opening and closing of the holy door of Rome ===
On 24 December 2024, Pope Francis opened the Holy Door of the Basilica of Saint Peter in the Vatican, officially marking the beginning of the Holy Year.

On the following day, the 29th, Cardinal Vicar Baldassare Reina opened the Holy Door of the Lateran Basilica; on 1 January 2025, the Holy Door of Santa Maria Maggiore was opened by Coadjutor Archpriest Cardinal Rolandas Makrickas; and finally, on 5 January, the Holy Door of the Basilica of Saint Paul Outside the Wall, of which the cardinal is archpriest, was opened by American Cardinal James Michael Harvey.

A fifth door, located at the Roman prison in Rebibbia, was opened on 26 December 2024. The act is intended to serve as a symbol "inviting all prisoners to look to the future with hope and a renewed sense of confidence". This was the first time a prison door has been opened to mark the commencement of a jubilee.

On 9 January 2025, Archbishop Santo Marcianò of the Military Ordinariate of Italy designated Italian naval ship Amerigo Vespucci as a 2025 Jubilee church and site "for sacred pilgrimages and for pious visits among its missions at sea".

On 25 December, Cardinal Makrickas closed the Holy Door of Santa Maria Maggiore; on 27 December, Cardinal Reina closed that of the Lateran Basilica; and on 28 December, Cardinal Harvey closed that of Saint Paul Outside the Walls.

Finally, on 6 January 2026, Pope Leo XIV closed the Holy Door of St. Peter's Basilica, thus officially concluding the Holy Year.

=== Events ===
The jubilee began on Christmas Eve (24 December) 2024, with Francis knocking on the Holy Door of St. Peter's Basilica in the Vatican from his wheelchair. The door was swung open and Francis rolled through the doorway as the basilica's Christmas Eve Mass began.

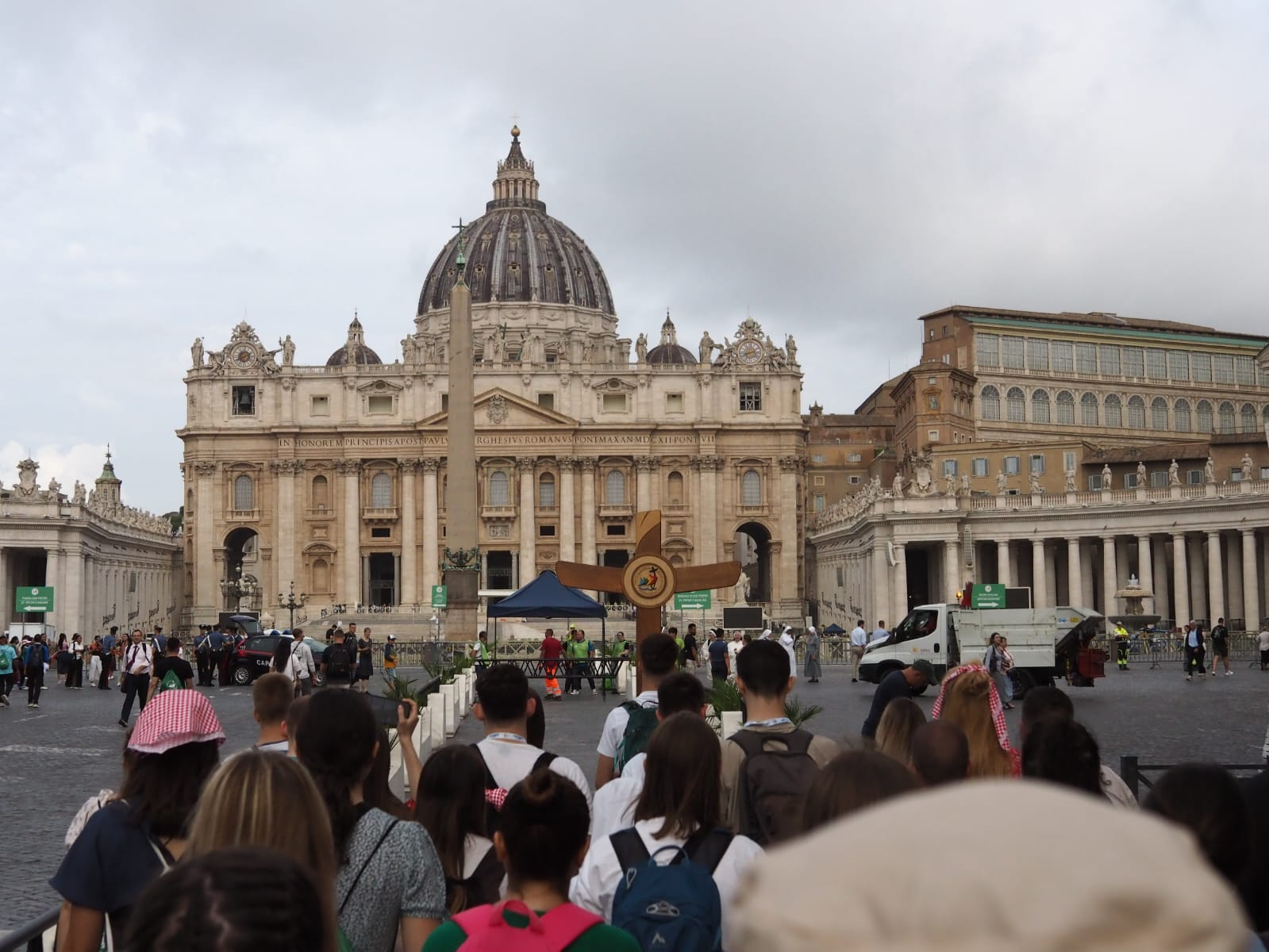
Pilgrims at the Jubilee of the Youth

The year included a number of subsidiary thematic jubilees: for example, the Jubilee of Artists and the World of Culture was held between 15 and 18 February, the Jubilee of the Missionaries of Mercy is from 28 to 30 March, and the Jubilee of Families, Children, Grandparents and the Elderly takes place from 30 May to 1 June. During the Jubilee of Artists and the World of Culture, among others, producer Tim Burton, actress Monica Bellucci, designer Dante Ferretti, scenarist Abel Ferrara, writers Nadia Terranova and Luca Doninelli, and singers Gigi D'Alessio and Enrico Ruggeri registered for participation. It started with a general audience in St. Peter's Square, following international meeting "Sharing Hope – Horizons of Cultural Heritage" in Vatican Museums. The next day was opening of the Window Gallery – Conciliazione 5, located in Via della Conciliazione, and presentation of the "Yan Pei-Ming" project by Roman prisoners.

The 2025 Jubilee was briefly interrupted following the death of Pope Francis on Easter Monday. On 8 May, Pope Leo XIV was elected as his successor. This marks the third time two popes have presided over a Jubilee, after those of 1390 (Urban VI and Boniface IX) and 1700 (Innocent XII and Clement XI).

"World Meeting on Human Fraternity 2025" took place on the St. Peter's Square on 12 and 13 September, with concert of Andrea Bocelli, Pharrell Williams with the gospel choir Voices of Fire, and John Legend.

== Attendance ==
During the first two weeks of the jubilee, more than 545,000 pilgrims passed through the Holy Door of the St. Peter's Basilica in Rome. In the first month of the jubilee, this number exceeded 1.3 million pilgrims. More than 30 million pilgrims were expected to pass through during the year, according to the organisers of the jubilee, the Dicastery for Evangelisation. However, according to the Dicastery for Evangelization, a total of 33,475,369 pilgrims from 185 countries participated in Rome during the Jubilee, 62% of whom were from Europe. On average, there were about 90,000 pilgrims in Rome during the Jubilee each day. The largest number of pilgrims came from Europe (62%) and North America (16%), followed by South America and Asia, and the smallest number came from Africa and the Middle East. Around 7,000 volunteers also participated in the Jubilee, 2,000 of whom were members of the Order of Malta.

== Reactions ==
In mid-January 2025, president of Cuba Miguel Díaz-Canel announced in a letter to Pope Francis the release of 553 prisoners "in the spirit of the regular Jubilee 2025 that was proclaimed by His Holiness Pope Francis".

The Mayor of Rome and the Italian Government's Special Commissioner for the Jubilee, Roberto Gualtieri, stated at the closing of the Jubilee that the Jubilee of the Youth and the Mass with the Pope at Tor Vergata were "an event that will remain in the history of our City and the Church". He added that "the Jubilee was the driving force" of the City of Rome during 2025.

=== Conspiracy theories ===
In December 2024, various viral posts on Instagram, TikTok, Reddit, and Facebook claimed falsely that the pope would be opening "spiritual portals" or "sacred portals" (Note: The Latin word for door is "porta") in a "never-before-performed" ritual. Some posts also claimed falsely that the ritual included opening a "tomb of Lucifer" under the Vatican. The claim of a new ritual appeared to stem from a New York Post article with a misleading title referring to the opening of the additional Rebibbia prison door. It is unclear where the Tomb of Lucifer claim originated; however, Bible scholar Daniel McClellan suggested that a tomb in the Vatican Necropolis labeled as the "Tomb of Lucifer" may have begun the rumor, and explained that in pre-Constantinian times when the tomb was constructed the name Lucifer did not have Satanic connotations, with contemporary Christians even having Lucifer as their personal name.
