= Sav Rodgers =

American filmmaker (born 1994)

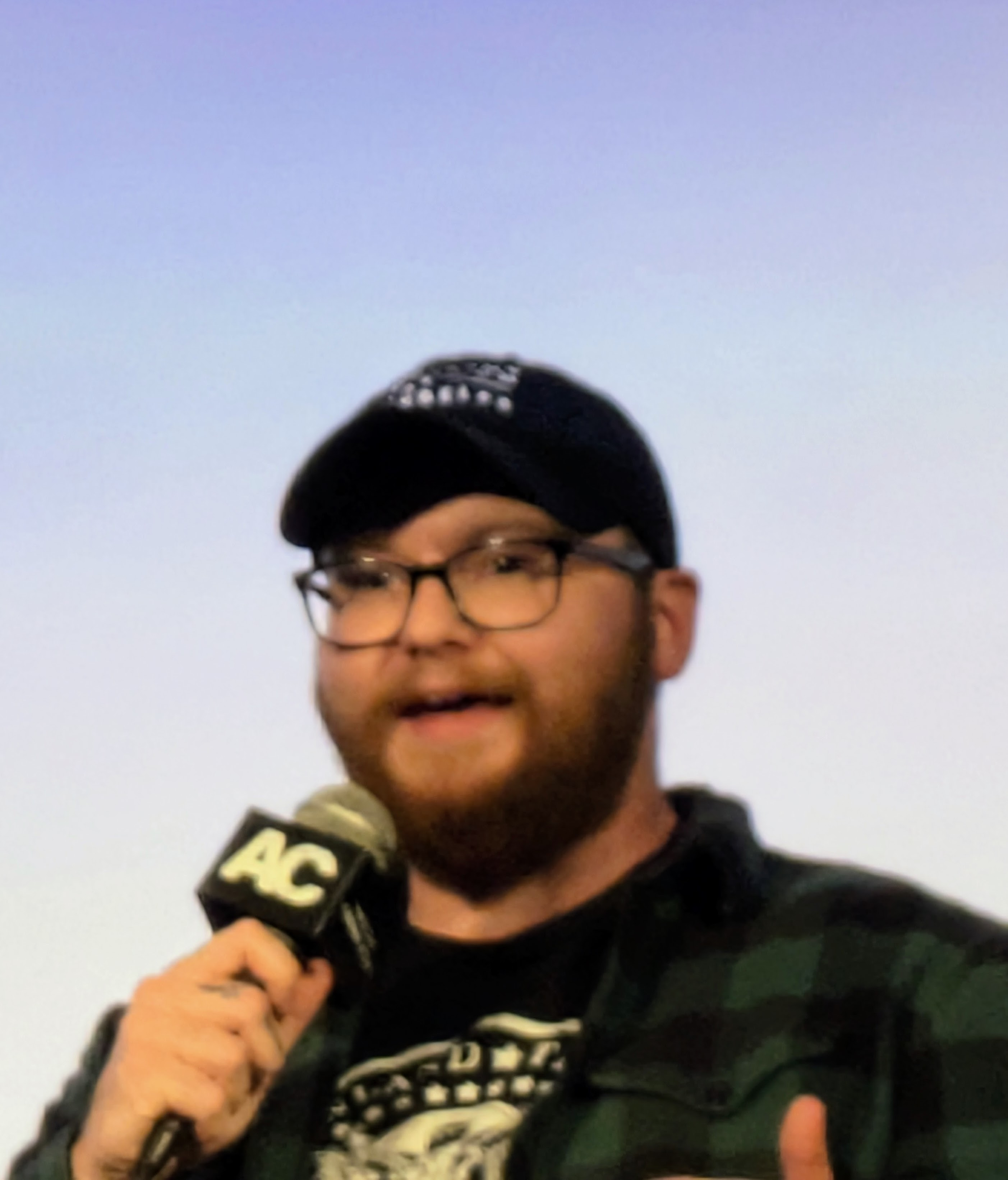
- Rodgers at a 2025 screening in Hollywood
- Born: November 29, 1994 (age 31)
- Occupations: Director; producer; writer
- Style: Documentary
- Spouse: Riley
- Website: savrodgers.com

Sav Rodgers (born November 29, 1994) is an American film director, screenwriter, and documentarian. He came to prominence with the semi auto-biographical documentary Chasing Chasing Amy (2024), which he directed, produced, and appeared in.

Rodgers is originally from Kansas City. He graduated from the University of Kansas, and after being selected to give a TED Talk in 2018, he launched his filmmaking career. His screenplays have been recognized by numerous organizations, including GLAAD, Outfest, and ScreenCraft. In 2024, Rodgers was named to Forbes' "30 Under 30" Media List, and he founded a non-profit organization called the Transgender Film Center that helps trans creators reach their career goals.

Rodgers' feature directorial debut Chasing Chasing Amy (2024) explores Kevin Smith's 1997 film Chasing Amy, its complicated legacy, and the effect the film had upon Rodgers' childhood.
