= Self-tying shoes =

Footwear designed to automatically tighten when worn

Self-Tying shoes
- Back to the Future franchise element
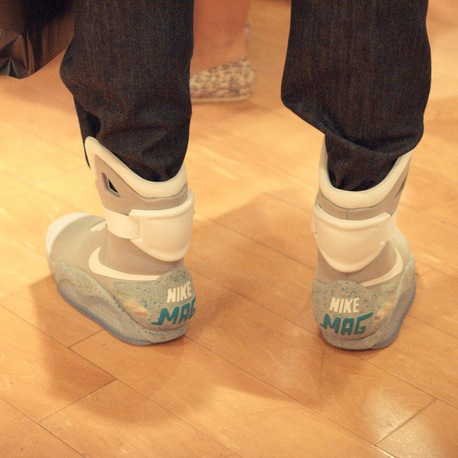
- A replica of the original Nike Mag shoes, 2011
- Publisher: Amblin Entertainment
- First appearance: Back to the Future Part II; 1989
- Created by: Robert Zemeckis; Bob Gale
- Genre: Science fiction

In-universe information
- Type: Shoe
- Affiliation: Marty McFly; Emmett "Doc" Brown

Self-tying shoes (also known as self-lacing or power laces) are designed to automatically tighten once the user puts them on. Such types of "smart shoes" were initially depicted in the 1989 science fiction film Back to the Future Part II.

== Manufacturers ==
=== Nike ===
In April 2009, Nike filed a patent for self-lacing shoes, with a design that bears a resemblance to those worn by Marty in the 1989 film Back to the Future Part II, raising speculation among fans about a possible debut of self-lacing shoes. In 2014, Tinker Hatfield, the designer of the original Nike shoes as depicted in Back to the Future Part II, indicated that they would introduce shoes with power-lacing technology the following year, 2015. Fewer than 100 pairs of Nike Mags with power-lacing capabilities were made and sold through an online draw starting October 4, 2016, with all proceeds going to the Michael J. Fox Foundation.

In March 2016, at a press event in New York, Nike unveiled its self-tying shoe to market, the HyperAdapt 1.0, which was scheduled to hit store shelves in select Nike locations on November 28. The HyperAdapt does not have any real laces, but embedded actuators that, in tandem with pressure monitors, delicately conform the shoe's cushions to the foot's shape; once the user steps in, the heel will hit a sensor and the system will automatically tighten. The HyperAdapt also comes with two buttons on the side tighten and loose, so the user can adjust it to their preference. Nike CEO, Mark Parker, said comparing the self-lacing sneaker tech with self driving car tech is a "good analogy" in terms of mainstream appeal. The company introduced a basketball version of HyperAdapt shoes called Adapt BB in 2019. Nike then introduced a shoe in 2020 called Adapt Auto Max. Nike claims to have taken inspiration from the Nike Air Max 90s.

=== Puma ===
In November 2015, Puma unveiled the Autodiscs, which features Puma's patented Disc closure system that uses a servo motor that powers a uniquely configured cable system designed to offer tunable support throughout the shoe. This prototype version features a micro USB cable to charge the on-board battery which powers the motor, but commercial version will have a charging plate included, so users won't have to worry about plugging the shoe to a power source. Puma has made 50 pairs of the Autodisc, with many of them reserved to athletes like Usain Bolt and Rickie Fowler. By 2019, Puma had developed micro-motors to adjust the fit of a shoe from an iPhone known as Fi.

=== Power Laces, LLC ===
In 2010, Blake Bevin, a self-described "science geek", created a prototype of self-lacing shoes, inspired by Marty's Nike MAG; once the user steps in, a sensor records the pressure of the foot on the sole and activates two servo motors, which apply tension to the laces, thus tightening the shoe. A touch-activated switch reverses the servos and loosens the laces. Bevin posted DIY instructions on how to recreate the power laces technology on her website. Later, Bevin founded Power Laces, LLC started a Kickstarter project in order to fund the development of commercial version and successfully raised the pledged goal of $25,024.

=== Powerlace ===
Powerlace P-One shoes are able to lace up automatically based on the wearer's body weight. Once the shoes are on, the wearer presses their heel on the concealed disc linked to the laces by wires, and wearers can use a lever attached to the back of the shoe to release pressure and loosen the lace. In November 2014, the company started a kickstarter project to raise funds and sell the shoes.

=== Digitsole Smartshoe ===
The Canadian company Digitsole, which already sells smart soles, has unveiled a prototype of a smart sneaker. It is a self-tightening, heating, and shock-absorbing shoe with a USB connector and can be monitored via Bluetooth with a smartphone.

== See also ==
- List of shoe styles
- Nike Mag
