= Back to the Future (franchise) =

American science fiction franchise

- Created by: Robert Zemeckis; Bob Gale
- Original work: Back to the Future (1985)
- Owners: Universal Pictures; Amblin Entertainment
- Years: 1985–present

Films and television
- Films: Back to the Future (1985); Back to the Future Part II (1989); Back to the Future Part III (1990)
- Short film: Doc Brown Saves the World (2015)
- Animated series: Back to the Future (1991–1992)

Theatrical presentations
- Musical: Back to the Future: The Musical (2020)

Games
- Video games: List of video games

Audio
- Soundtracks: List of soundtracks

Miscellaneous
- Theme park attractions: Back to the Future: The Ride (1991); Universal Mega Movie Summer (2025)
- Pinball: Back to the Future: The Pinball (1990)
- Character(s): List of characters

Official website
- Backtothefuture.com

Back to the Future is an American science fiction media franchise created by Robert Zemeckis and Bob Gale. The franchise follows high school student Marty McFly and eccentric scientist Dr. Emmett "Doc" Brown as they use a DeLorean time machine to time travel through different periods in the history of the fictional town of Hill Valley, California.

The first Back to the Future film was the highest-grossing film of 1985 and became an international phenomenon, leading to the second and third films, which were produced back-to-back and released in 1989 and 1990, respectively. Although the sequels did not perform as well at the box office as the first film, the trilogy remains popular and has produced spin-offs, including an animated television series, a motion-simulation ride at Universal Destinations & Experiences locations in Universal City, California, Orlando, Florida, and Osaka, Japan (all later closed), a series of video games, and a stage musical. The film's visual effects were created by Industrial Light & Magic. The first film won an Academy Award for Sound Editing.

== Films ==
=== Back to the Future (1985) ===
Seventeen-year-old Marty McFly is accidentally sent back in time from October 26, 1985, to November 5, 1955. He travels 30 years into the past using a time machine built by his eccentric scientist friend, Emmett "Doc" Brown, out of a DeLorean. While Doc is explaining how the time machine works, he is attacked and ultimately shot and killed by Libyan terrorists from whom he stole the plutonium that fuels the time machine. To escape, Marty attempts to drive the DeLorean and, when the car reaches 88 miles per hour, the flux capacitor activates, sending him to the past.

Upon arriving in 1955, Marty encounters his father, George McFly, who is a teenager at the time. Inadvertently, Marty ruins the moment when George first meets Lorraine Baines, Marty’s mother. As a result, Marty ends up taking George’s place in an incident that leads his parents to fall in love. However, instead of Lorraine falling for George, she begins to fall for Marty. This threatens to create a paradox that could prevent Marty's own existence; if his parents do not fall in love, he can never be born.

Without plutonium to power the DeLorean and return to 1985, Marty must find Doc Brown, who has not yet invented time travel, to help him get back to his own time. Additionally, he needs to figure out how to reunite his parents and ensure that they fall in love.

Throughout Marty’s efforts to make his parents fall in love, he is continually confronted by Biff Tannen, George’s bully. Biff wants Lorraine for himself, and George lacks the confidence to stand up to him or fight for what he desires. Ultimately, Marty succeeds in getting his parents to fall in love and helps George find the courage to confront Biff.

After executing their plan to harness a lightning strike as energy for the time machine, Marty returns to the future. When he arrives home, he discovers that his interventions in 1955 have positively transformed his family’s situation. George is now much more confident and has become an accomplished science fiction author—something he had expressed a desire to do back in 1955. Marty’s two older siblings, Dave and Linda McFly, have also achieved success in their careers. Additionally, Marty now owns his dream car, which he had mentioned to his girlfriend, Jennifer Parker, at the beginning of the film. Biff's circumstances have changed as well; he is now an auto detailer who waxes George’s car rather than being George’s supervisor as he was before the timeline was altered.

Despite Doc’s insistence that Marty keep the details of the future to himself, Marty inadvertently leaves a note in his pocket before returning to 1985. This note warns Doc about the terrorist attack that will ultimately lead to his death. Reading the note in 1955, Doc is forewarned, and when the attack occurs in 1985, he survives by wearing a bulletproof vest.

In the film’s final moments, Doc appears in a futuristic version of the DeLorean, informing Marty and Jennifer that they must travel to the future to resolve an issue concerning their children.

=== Back to the Future Part II (1989) ===
Doc, Marty, and Jennifer travel to Hill Valley in 2015, where Doc discovers that Marty’s future family is in turmoil. Marty’s son, Marty McFly Jr., has been wrongly accused of a crime and sent to prison, which leads to the decline of the McFly family. After resolving the issues with his family, Marty buys a sports almanac that contains the outcomes of sporting events from 1950 to 2000. However, Doc warns Marty against using time travel for financial gain, and Marty ultimately throws the almanac away in a nearby trash can, where it is discovered by an elderly Biff Tannen.

To shield Jennifer from the shocks of time travel, Doc uses one of his inventions to erase her memory and put her to sleep for a couple of hours. However, the police find her sleeping and take her to what will become her future home. Marty and Doc then have to visit Marty’s future home to retrieve her. While there, Marty gets a glimpse of his future and is not entirely satisfied with what he sees.

While Marty and Doc are at the McFly home in 2015, old Biff steals the DeLorean time machine and gives the sports almanac to his younger self in 1955. When Marty and Doc return to 1985, they discover that 1955 Biff has been using the almanac for financial gain. This allows him to turn Courthouse Square into a casino, take control of Hill Valley, get away with murdering Marty’s father, George, and later marry Lorraine.

Realizing that Biff was given the sports almanac by his older self on November 12, 1955, Marty and Doc travel back to that date to retrieve the book. They succeed in this endeavor through a complex series of events, often nearly encountering their past selves. Just as Doc is about to land the flying DeLorean and pick up Marty to return to 1985, a lightning bolt strikes the DeLorean, activating the flux capacitor and sending Doc back to 1885, which leaves Marty stranded in 1955 once again.

=== Back to the Future Part III (1990) ===
After learning that Doc Brown is in 1885, Marty and Doc from 1955 set out to find and repair the DeLorean. Doc had hidden the DeLorean in 1885 with the intention for Marty to find it and use it to return to 1985. He leaves Marty a letter stating that he is happy in 1885 and urges Marty not to travel back in time to save him. However, when Marty discovers that Doc will be shot and killed by Biff’s great-grandfather, the outlaw Buford "Mad Dog" Tannen, he decides to travel back in time anyway to save Doc, who is now a blacksmith.

Upon arriving, Marty finds himself caught in the middle of a chase between the United States Cavalry and American Indians, forcing him to flee into a cave. In the process, he tears the DeLorean's fuel line and loses all of its gasoline. After locating Doc, Marty convinces him to return to 1985, but Doc is smitten after rescuing schoolteacher Clara Clayton. After confronting and defeating Buford Tannen, Marty and Doc use a speeding locomotive to propel the DeLorean to 88 miles per hour, allowing Marty to return to 1985 without Doc.

When the DeLorean reappears in 1985, it is destroyed by a modern train, and Marty barely escapes. After reuniting with Jennifer, the two visit the wreckage of the DeLorean. Suddenly, Doc, Clara, and their two children arrive in a time-traveling steam locomotive. Doc reminds Marty and Jennifer that "your future is whatever you make it," urging them to "make it a good one." The locomotive lifts off the tracks and departs from 1985, concluding the trilogy.

=== Future of the franchise ===
Co-writer and director Robert Zemeckis, along with co-writer Bob Gale, have an agreement with Steven Spielberg and Amblin that any future installments in the Back to the Future franchise cannot be made without their involvement. They have both stated that another film is "not going to happen." Gale expressed that he does not want to see another film in the series without the character of Marty McFly, nor with any actor other than Michael J. Fox playing him. He acknowledged that Fox's current health condition, Parkinson's disease, makes this impossible. Gale illustrated this point during a 2008 fan convention in Florida by saying, "The idea of making another Back to the Future movie without Michael J. Fox – you know, that's like saying, 'I'm going to cook you a steak dinner and I'm going to hold the beef.'"

Gale also mentioned that the Telltale video game adaptation is the closest thing to what a fourth film could resemble. In an interview on October 21, 2015, the date on which Marty McFly was supposed to arrive in the future, Christopher Lloyd stated that he would consider participating in a fourth film, provided the original cast and creative team returned, along with a story that is "worth telling." On the same day, Lloyd reprised his role as Doc Brown in a brief segment, where the character returned with a special message to mark the 2015 date.

In 2020, actor Tom Holland mentioned in an interview with BBC Radio 1 that he had been approached by an unnamed producer regarding a possible reboot of the franchise, with him in the lead role as Marty McFly or a similar new character. However, Holland expressed reluctance to accept the offer, describing the existing films as "perfect films." He did state that he would be interested in recreating scenes from the films in a deepfake homage video or short film.

== Short film ==
=== Doc Brown Saves the World (2015) ===
Doc Brown Saves the World is a 2015 direct-to-video short film starring Christopher Lloyd as Emmett Brown. The short debuted on the 2015 Blu-ray and DVD release of the Back to the Future trilogy, which commemorated the franchise's 30th anniversary. The short was released on October 20, 2015.

==== Plot ====
Emmett Brown is in an undisclosed location outside Hill Valley, California. He sets up a video camera to record a message for Marty McFly, explaining that it is October 21, 2015, one hour before Marty, Doc, and Jennifer Parker arrive from 1985. He shares that during his travels to the future, he discovered catastrophic events that unfolded on October 21, 2045, due to a nuclear holocaust.

He traces the origins of this disaster to four inventions: the food hydrator, self-lacing shoes, the hoverboard, and the Mr. Fusion home energy reactor. The first three inventions contributed to a society that became lazy and obese, leading to widespread waste. The introduction of hoverboards eventually gave rise to hovercars, causing people to carelessly throw trash out of their windows. This resulted in a massive trash storm in 2021.

The accumulated garbage created a need for disposal, which led to the production of 100 million Mr. Fusion units, each containing a small nuclear reactor. Tragically, all of these units detonated on October 21, 2045. The chain of events began less than 24 hours after Marty caused Griff Tannen to crash his hoverboard into the Hill Valley Courthouse, resulting in Griff's sentencing. Fueled by anger over the public mockery he faced, Griff vowed revenge and founded a company called GriffTech.

Doc then displays a tablet computer featuring a digital version of the Hill Valley Telegraph. On June 13, 2032, GriffTech launched a social media platform called ThingMeme, which received funding from Douglas J. Needles. ThingMeme allowed inanimate objects to post selfies online, but it was ultimately a scam that granted Griff access to every object on Earth. On the 30th anniversary of his arrest, October 21, 2045, he uploaded a virus intended to make every object flash the word "butthead." Unfortunately, the virus backfired and short-circuited the Mr. Fusion network, triggering the disaster.

Doc Brown travels to an unknown date to ensure that certain inventions are never created, preventing a nuclear explosion. He leaves his camera on, which captures the moment the inventions are erased from history. When he returns to 2015, dressed in a winter jacket and ski goggles, he declares that the mission was more complicated than he anticipated but ultimately a success. He holds up a tablet computer, where the headline of the Hill Valley Telegraph changes from "Griff Tannen Founds Grifftech" to "Griff Tannen Found Guilty."

However, Doc's excitement is short-lived. As he reaches into his pocket, he pulls out the Quantum Mind Jar, which he thought he had disposed of in 2075. He worries that failing to eliminate it will unravel everything they have accomplished. The artificial intelligence within the Quantum Mind Jar tells Doc that they need to go back to the future, but he dismisses this idea, not wanting to risk further time travel.

Suddenly, another Emmett Brown arrives and also claims his experiment a success. Both versions of Doc Brown, along with the artificial intelligence of the Quantum Mind Jar, are shocked to find that two Emmett Browns are now present.

== Cast and crew ==
=== Cast and characters ===
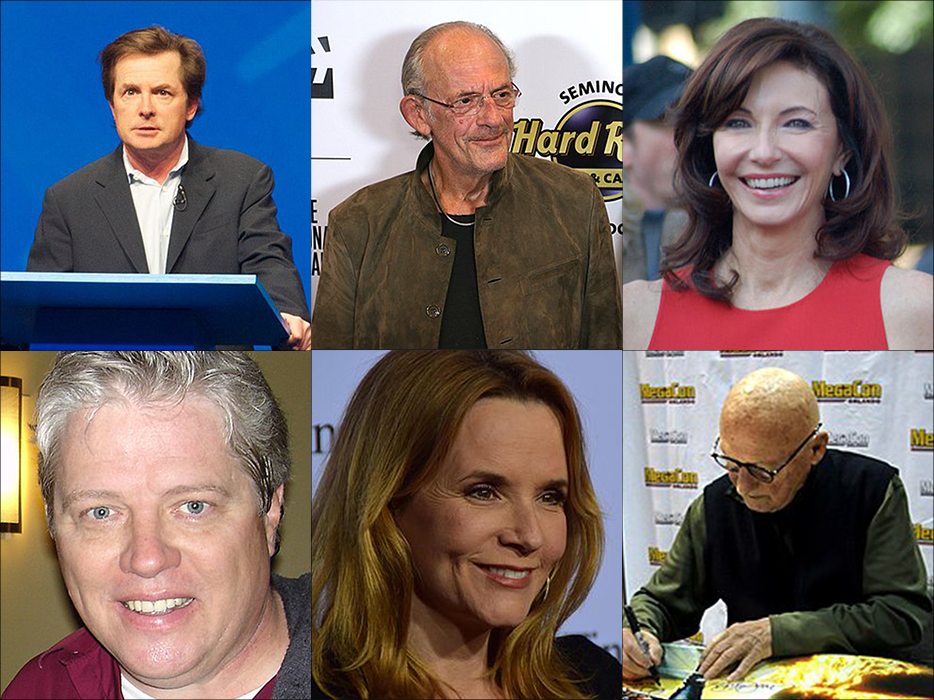
(l–r, top row) Michael J. Fox, Christopher Lloyd, Mary Steenburgen, (bottom row) Thomas F. Wilson, Lea Thompson and James Tolkan

List indicators

This section includes characters who will appear or have appeared in two or more installments in the franchise.

- An empty grey cell indicates the character was not in the film, or that the character's official presence has not yet been confirmed.
- ^{A} indicates an appearance through archival footage or audio.
- ^{E} indicates an appearance not included in the theatrical cut.
- ^{O} indicates an older version of the character.
- ^{P} indicates an appearance in onscreen photographs.
- ^{V} indicates a voice-only role.
- ^{Y} indicates a younger version of the character.
- ^{S} indicates an appearance as a character's singing voice.

Characters	Films			Ride	Animated series		Video game	Short film	Musical	
Characters	Back to the Future	Back to the Future Part II	Back to the Future Part III	Back to the Future: The Ride	Back to the Future		Back to the Future: The Game	Doc Brown Saves the World	Back to the Future: The Musical	
Characters	Back to the Future	Back to the Future Part II	Back to the Future Part III	Back to the Future: The Ride	Season 1	Season 2	Back to the Future: The Game	Doc Brown Saves the World	West End	Broadway
Martin "Marty" McFly	Michael J. Fox Mark Campbell^{S}	Michael J. Fox Mark Campbell^{S}	Michael J. Fox	Michael J. Fox^{A}	David Kaufman^{V}	David Kaufman^{V}	A.J. LoCascio^{V} Michael J. Fox^{V} (Note: Fox provided the voice of three versions of future Marty McFly in the games' final chapter.)		Olly Dobson	Casey Likes
Emmett "Doc" Brown	Christopher Lloyd	Christopher Lloyd	Christopher Lloyd	Christopher Lloyd	Dan Castellaneta^{V} Christopher Lloyd (Note: Christopher Lloyd portrayed Doc Brown in the series' live-action segments)	Dan Castellaneta^{V} Christopher Lloyd	Christopher Lloyd^{V} James Arnold Taylor^{V}^{Y}	Christopher Lloyd	Roger Bart	Roger Bart
Biff Tannen	Thomas F. Wilson	Thomas F. Wilson	Thomas F. Wilson	Thomas F. Wilson	Thomas F. Wilson^{V}	Thomas F. Wilson^{V}	Kid Beyond^{V} Thomas F. Wilson^{V} (Note: Thomas F. Wilson replaced Kid Beyond as the voice of Biff Tannen in the game's 2015 re-release.)		Aidan Cutler	Nathaniel Hackmann
George McFly	Crispin Glover	Jeffrey Weissman Crispin Glover^{A}	Jeffrey Weissman				Michael Sommers^{V}		Hugh Coles	Hugh Coles
Lorraine Baines-McFly	Lea Thompson	Lea Thompson	Lea Thompson				Aimee Miles^{V}		Rosanna Hyland	Liana Hunt
Jennifer Parker	Claudia Wells	Elisabeth Shue	Elisabeth Shue		Cathy Cavadini^{V}	Cathy Cavadini^{V}	Claudia Wells^{V}		Courtney-Mae Briggs	Mikaela Secada
Einstein	Tiger	Freddie	Freddie	Freddie Tiger^{A}	Danny Mann^{V}	Hal Rayle^{V}	Appeared			
Gerald Strickland	James Tolkan	James Tolkan					Photograph		Mark Oxtoby	Merritt David Janes
3-D	Casey Siemaszko	Casey Siemaszko					Photograph		Shane O'Riordan	Will Branner
Match	Billy Zane	Billy Zane					Photograph			
Skinhead	J. J. Cohen	J. J. Cohen					Photograph			
Marvin Berry	Harry Waters Jr.	Harry Waters Jr.							Cedric Neal	Jelani Remy
Red	George Buck Flower	George Buck Flower							Mark Oxtoby	Merritt David Janes
David "Dave" McFly	Marc McClure	Marc McClure^{E}	Marc McClure						Will Haswell	Daryl Tofa
Linda McFly	Wendie Jo Sperber		Wendie Jo Sperber						Emma Lloyd	Amber Ardolino
Goldie Wilson	Donald Fullilove								Cedric Neal	Jelani Remy
Sam Baines	George DiCenzo								Will Haswell	Merritt David Janes
Stella Baines	Frances Lee McCain								Emma Lloyd	Amber Ardolino
Babs	Lisa Freeman	Lisa Freeman							Nic Myers	Becca Petersen
Betty	Cristen Kauffman								Rhianne Alleyne	Victoria Byrd
Griff Tannen		Thomas F. Wilson			Thomas F. Wilson^{V}			Thomas F. Wilson^{P}		
Douglas J. Needles		Flea	Flea							
Buford "Mad Dog" Tannen		Thomas F. Wilson^{P}	Thomas F. Wilson		Intro cameo					
Clara Clayton			Mary Steenburgen		Mary Steenburgen^{V}	Mary Steenburgen^{V}				
William McFly			Lindsay Vail Clark Michael J. Fox^{P}				Michael J. Fox^{V}			
James Strickland			James Tolkan				Photograph			
Jules Brown			Todd Cameron Brown		Joshua Keaton^{V}	Joshua Keaton^{V}				
Verne Brown			Dannel Evans		Troy Davidson^{V}	Troy Davidson^{V}				
Copernicus	Uncredited dog		Foster							
Beauregard Tannen					Thomas F. Wilson^{V}		Owen Thomas^{V}			

== Reception ==
=== Box office performance ===
Film	Release date	Box office gross			Budget	Ref.
Film	Release date	North America	Other territories	Worldwide	Budget	Ref.
Back to the Future	July 3, 1985	$223,241,252	$173,250,370	$396,491,622	$19,000,000	
Back to the Future Part II	November 22, 1989	$118,450,002	$213,521,866	$331,950,002	$40,000,000	
Back to the Future Part III	May 25, 1990	$88,055,283	$156,031,976	$244,087,259	$40,000,000	
Total		$429,746,537	$542,804,212	$972,550,749	$99,000,000	

- Indicates adjusted totals based on ticket prices (by Box Office Mojo).

As of June 2011, the Back to the Future series ranked as the 14th-highest-grossing trilogy of all time in the domestic market when adjusted for inflation, the 17th-highest-grossing trilogy in the domestic market without adjusting for inflation, and the 13th-highest-grossing trilogy worldwide, also without adjusting for inflation.

The trilogy was re-released in select countries worldwide on October 21, 2015, to commemorate the date visited by the protagonists in Back to the Future Part II, generating $4.8 million on its opening day. In the United States and Canada, it earned $1.65 million from ticket sales across 1,815 North American theaters on its first day. Germany's opening garnered $1.4 million, while the United Kingdom brought in $345,000. Revenues from other territories, including Australia, Austria, France, and Italy, were moderate.

The first movie in the trilogy returned to select countries again for the 35th anniversary of its release. In the United Kingdom, this was originally scheduled to begin on May 29, 2020, but the opening dates of various theaters were delayed due to the COVID-19 pandemic. Many theaters also showed the rest of the trilogy, partially due to the coinciding 30th anniversary of Part III.

=== Critical and public response ===
Film	Critical		Public
Film	Rotten Tomatoes	Metacritic	CinemaScore
Back to the Future	92% (118 reviews)	87 (26 reviews)	—N/a
Back to the Future Part II	63% (63 reviews)	57 (17 reviews)	A−
Back to the Future Part III	81% (47 reviews)	55 (19 reviews)	A−

Marty McFly and Doc Brown were included in Empire's 100 Greatest Movie Characters of All Time, ranking No. 39 and No. 76, respectively.

== Cultural impact ==
=== Back to the Future Day ===
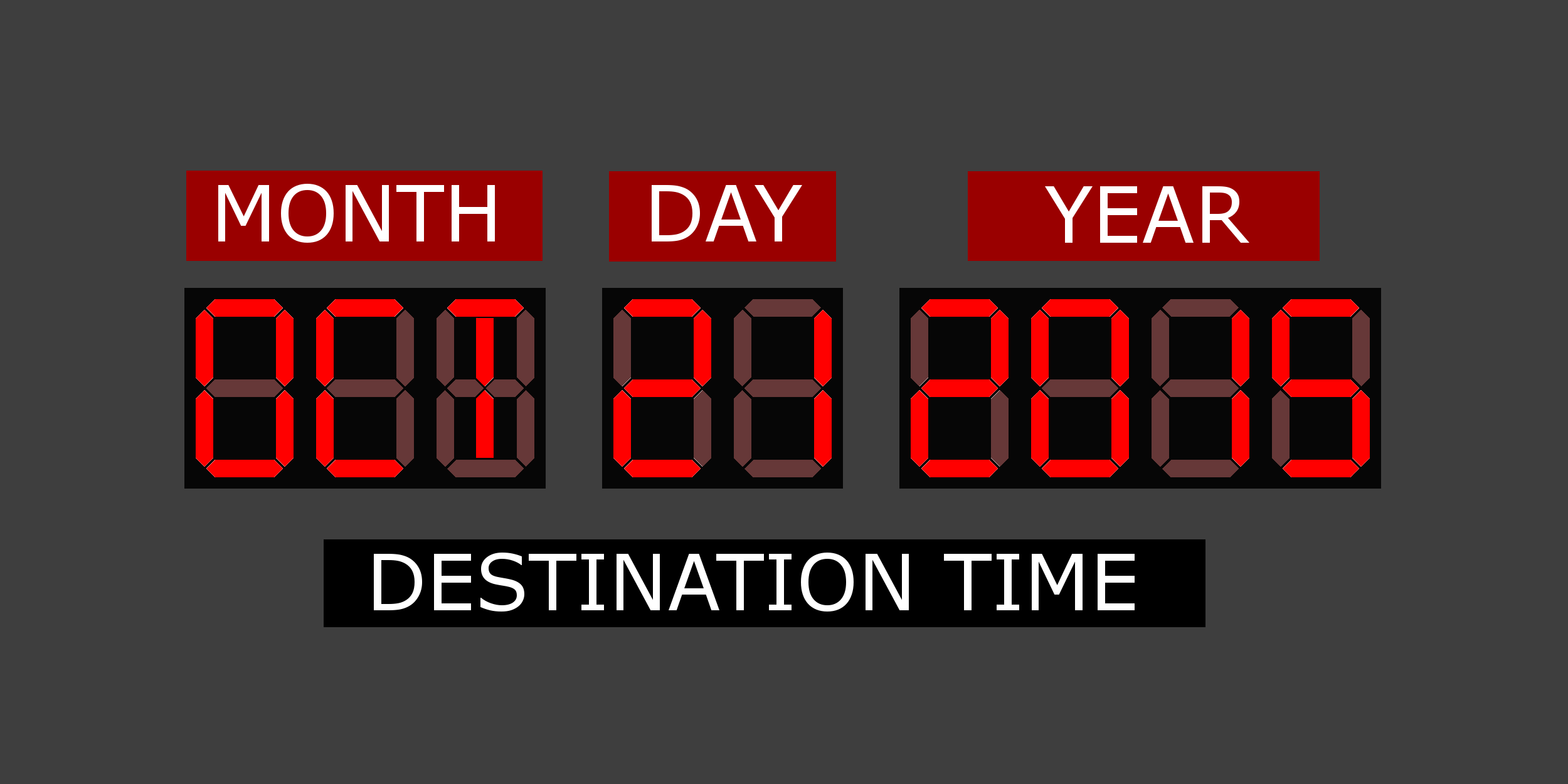
The day traveled to in Back to the Future II

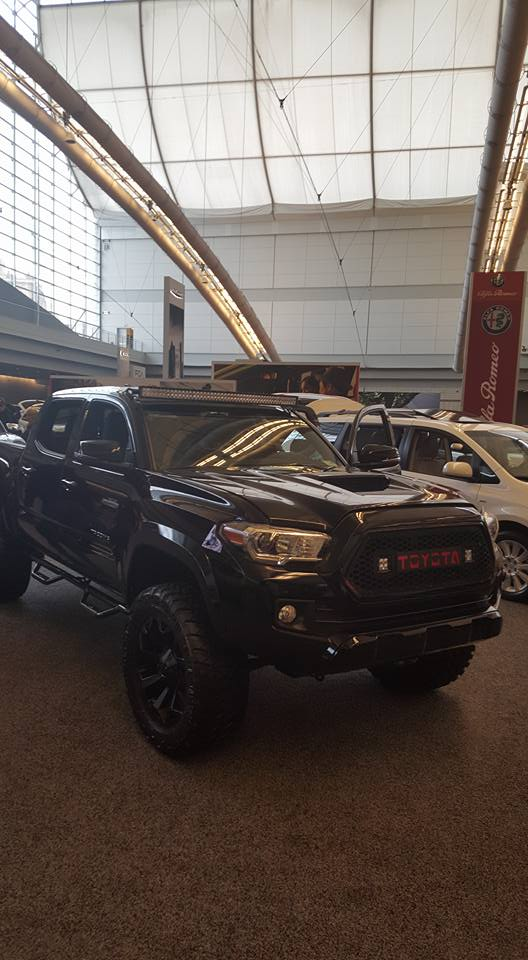
The replica Toyota Tacoma concept based on the original Toyota truck, on display during the Pittsburgh International Auto Show at the David L. Lawrence Convention Center in 2016.

October 21, 2015, the date used as the setting for the future events in the first act of the second film, has been called "Back to the Future Day" by the media. The year 2015 also commemorated the 30th anniversary of the release of the original film.

Many promotions were planned to mark the date, with many playing on the film's depiction of the future, including:

- Universal Pictures created a trailer for Jaws 19, the fictional 3D film advertised in the future setting.
- Universal and Mattel produced an advertisement for the hoverboard seen in the film.
- Pepsi produced a limited run of the "Pepsi Perfect" soft drink, including the unique bottles, which sold out before October 21, 2015.
- The Ford Motor Company allowed users configuring a Ford Focus on their website to add a Flux Capacitor as a $1.2 million option.
- Nintendo released the game Wild Gunman, which Marty is seen playing in the Cafe '80s scene, on the Wii U's Virtual Console service.
- The October 22, 2015, edition of USA Today used a mock front page that was a recreation of the one seen in the film on that date. The back of the mock page contains an advertisement for Jaws 19, as well as advertisements for the 30th-anniversary Back to the Future box set and The Michael J. Fox Foundation. On the real front page, the USA Today blue dot is replaced with a drone camera like the one seen in the film. The print edition of this issue sold out in record time, according to USA Today.
- Nike revealed that they had recreated the Nike Mag shoes that Michael J. Fox wears in the film, complete with self-lacing power laces (a 2011 design was based on the same shoes, but lacked the power laces). Although the laces operated more slowly than those seen in the film, they were shown to work as intended in an eight-second video featuring Fox wearing the shoes. Pairs of the shoes were sold via auction in 2016 to benefit The Michael J. Fox Foundation for Parkinson's research.
- Toyota and Universal Pictures celebrated the 30th anniversary of the film series with a Toyota Tacoma Concept that was inspired by the original 1985 pickup that Toyota created for the 1985 film. The 2016 Tacoma 4WD was recreated using the same features and black paint trim, KC HiLite driving lamps (modified with LED lighting), modified headlights and taillights (matching the 1985 version), Toyota badging on the truck's tailgate, D-4S fuel injection, 1985-inspired mudflaps, and customized license plates matching the 2015 vehicles in Part II. The only difference between the 1985 original and the 2016 concept is the tires: Goodyear was featured in the 1985 film, while BF Goodrich is used on the concept. Toyota notes that this is a one-off concept, as there are no plans to offer it as a package or trim level. Toyota also produced a promotional video starring Michael J. Fox and Christopher Lloyd and featuring many of the locations depicted in the film series, wherein the DeLorean's Mr. Fusion is used as a comparison for Toyota's hydrogen-powered Mirai.
- Universal re-released all three films on DVD and Blu-ray disc on October 20, 2015.
- Telltale Games re-released their licensed Back to the Future the Game in a 30th Anniversary edition for newer consoles a week in advance of October 21. Several video games released downloadable content related to Back to the Future to coincide with October 21, 2015, including Rocket League and LittleBigPlanet 3.
- Back to the Future: The Ultimate Visual History is an officially licensed book that includes 224 pages of behind-the-scenes stories, interviews, rare and never-before-seen images, concept art, storyboards, photos, and special removable replicas of paper items from the films, written by Michael Klastorin. The book was released on October 16, 2015.

Cast members appeared on Today and Jimmy Kimmel Live! on October 21, 2015. Nearly 2,000 theaters worldwide showed back-to-back screenings of the Back to the Future trilogy on October 21 and continuing through that weekend, earning over $4.8 million in single-day ticket sales. Universal Studios offered tours of the various filming locations around that date. The town of Reston, Virginia, temporarily changed its name to "Hill Valley" to commemorate the series during its annual film festival. Esquire Network aired the trilogy all day that day and throughout the weekend.

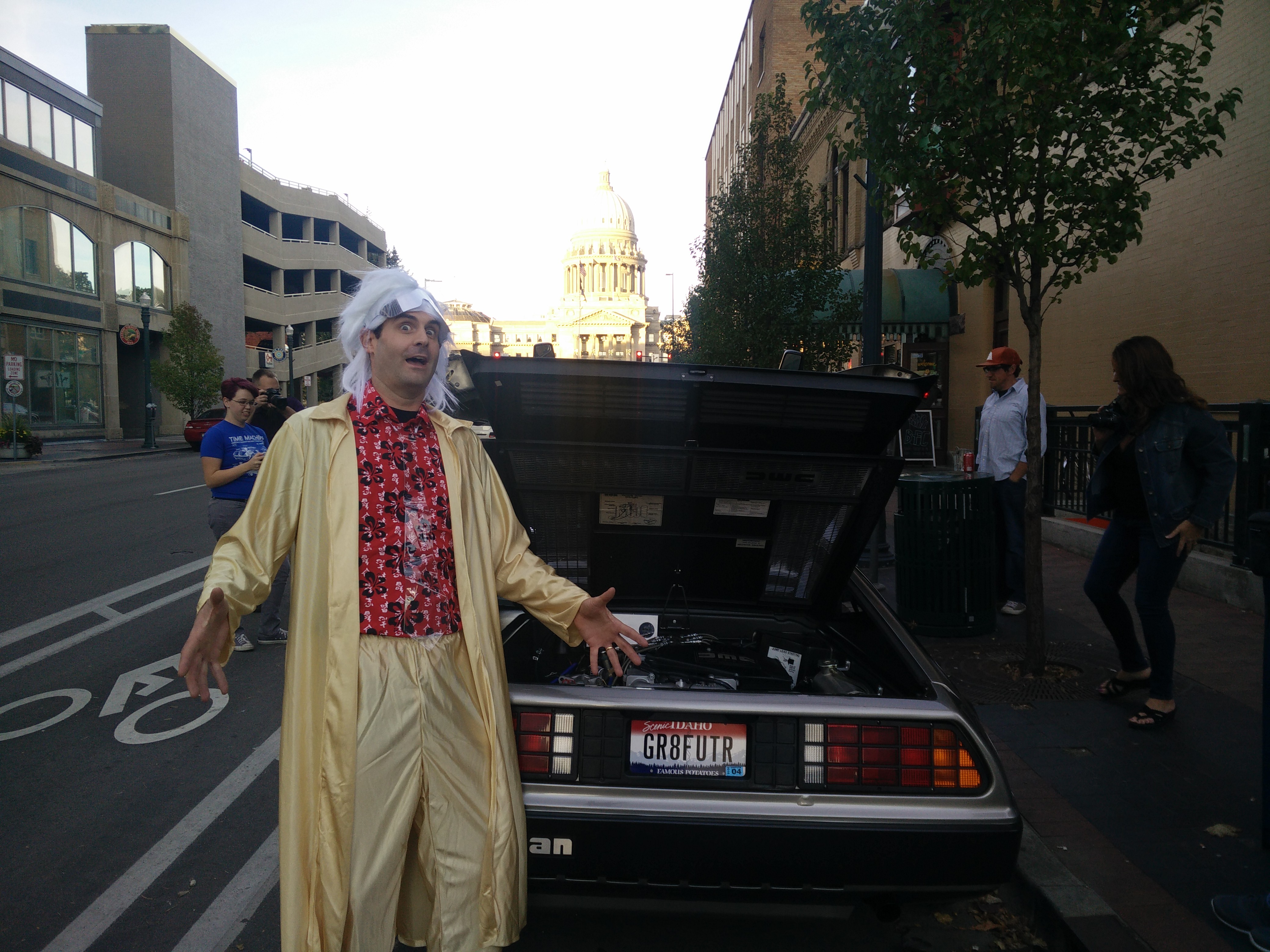
An Emmett Brown cosplayer at a "Back to the Future Day" screening in Boise, Idaho, 2015

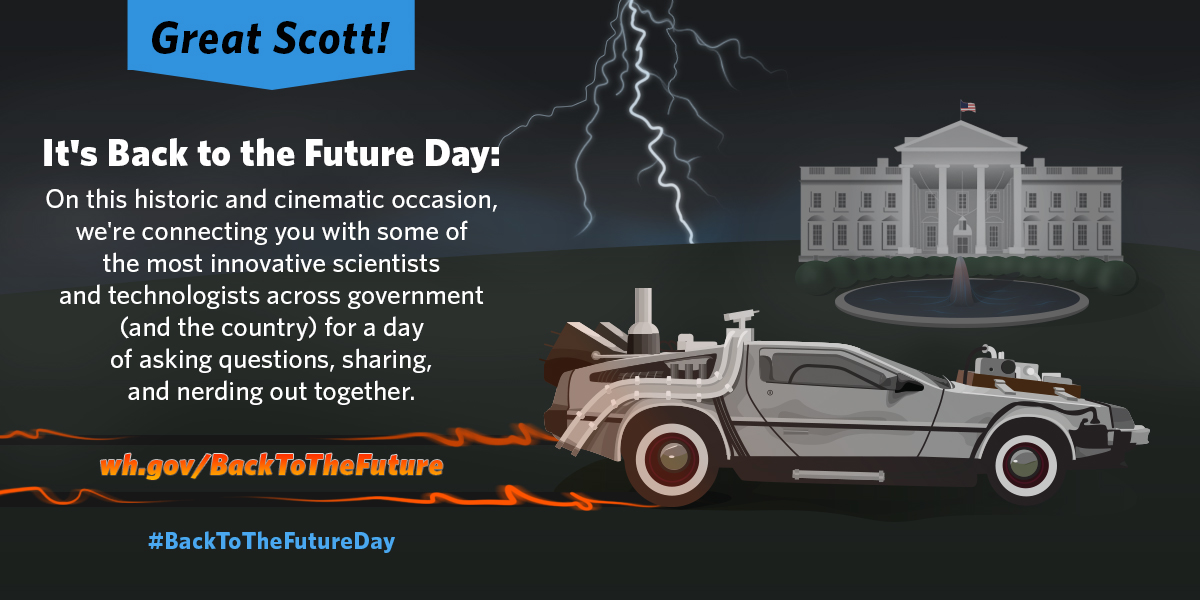
White House celebration of Back to the Future Day, 2015

== Music ==
Soundtrack title	Release date	Composer(s)	Label
Back to the Future: Music from the Motion Picture Soundtrack	July 20, 1985	Alan Silvestri	MCA
Back to the Future Part II: Original Motion Picture Soundtrack	November 22, 1989	Alan Silvestri	MCA
Back to the Future Part III: Original Motion Picture Soundtrack	May 29, 1990	Alan Silvestri	Varèse Sarabande
The Back to the Future Trilogy	September 21, 1999	Alan Silvestri	Varèse Sarabande
Back to the Future: Intrada Special Collection	November 24, 2009	Alan Silvestri	Intrada
Back to the Future: The Musical (Original Cast Recording)	March 11, 2022	Alan Silvestri and Glen Ballard	Masterworks Broadway

== Home media box sets ==
=== 2002 VHS and DVD release: "The Complete Trilogy" ===
In July 1997, Universal Studios announced that Back to the Future would be one of their first ten releases on the new DVD format, though it was ultimately delayed for five years. The films were released as a box set on VHS and DVD on December 17, 2002 in both widescreen (1.85:1) and full-screen (1.33:1) formats. The widescreen DVDs had to be reissued a year later because of framing errors in converting from open matte to widescreen.

=== 2010 DVD and Blu-ray release: "25th Anniversary Trilogy" ===
In June 2008, a special screening of the trilogy was held in Celebration, Florida. Bob Gale told the crowd they were seeing the digitally remastered version that was going to be used for the Blu-ray release of the movies. The Blu-ray box set was released on October 26, 2010, and includes bonus features, such as a newly produced six-part retrospective documentary titled Tales from the Future. Numerous complaints were made about the Region 1 packaging, leading to the release of an instruction sheet on how to safely remove and insert discs.

=== 2015 DVD and Blu-ray release: "30th Anniversary Trilogy" ===
On October 20, 2015, one day before the date of the fictional events depicted in the 2015 segment of Part II, the trilogy was once again released on Blu-ray and DVD. A bonus disc was included, featuring new material such as Outatime, a look at the restoration of the time machine from 2012; Doc Brown Saves the World!, a new short movie starring Christopher Lloyd; two episodes from The Animated Series; two novelty commercials about "Jaws 19" and the "2015 Hoverboard"; and other additional features.

=== 2020 Blu-ray and Ultra HD Blu-ray release: "The Ultimate Trilogy" ===
A new set, The Ultimate Trilogy, was released in October 2020 to celebrate the franchise's 35th anniversary and marked the trilogy's first release on Ultra HD Blu-ray. The set included a new digitally remastered 4K picture, Dolby Atmos sound, and additional previously unreleased content.

== Other media ==
=== Back to the Future (1991–1992) ===
Series	Seasons	Episodes	First released	Last released	Showrunner(s)	Network(s)
Back to the Future	2	26	September 14, 1991	December 26, 1992	TBA	CBS, France 2

An animated television series, Back to the Future: The Animated Series, lasted two seasons, each featuring 13 episodes, and ran on CBS from September 14, 1991, to December 26, 1992.

The TV series Back to the Future was an animated science-fiction comedy adventure television series based on the live-action film trilogy. Although the series takes place after the films, creator Bob Gale stated that the animated series takes place in its own alternate timeline.

The show lasted two seasons, each featuring 13 episodes, and ran on CBS from September 14, 1991, to December 26, 1992, with reruns until August 14, 1993. The network chose not to renew the show for a third season (citing low ratings). It was later rerun on Fox, as part of the FoxBox block, from March 22 to August 30, 2003. This show marked the debut television appearance of Bill Nye on a nationally broadcast show.

The central premise of the TV series was that, after the conclusion of Back to the Future Part III, in 1991, Dr. Emmett Brown moved to a farm in Hill Valley with his wife Clara, their sons Jules and Verne, and the family dog, Einstein. As with the films, time travel was achieved through the use of a modified DeLorean, which had apparently been rebuilt after it was destroyed at the end of the trilogy. The DeLorean now has voice-activated "time circuits" and can also travel instantaneously to different locations in space and time, in addition to folding into a suitcase. The characters also travel through time using the steam engine time machine Doc invented at the end of the third film.

Although Marty McFly is the show's main character and Jennifer Parker makes occasional appearances, the show focused primarily on the Brown family, whereas the films focused on the McFly family. The film's villain, Biff Tannen, also appeared frequently. In addition, relatives of the McFly, Brown, and Tannen families appeared in the past and future periods the characters visited. Unlike the films, which took place entirely in Hill Valley and the surrounding area, the series frequently took the characters to exotic locations. At the end of every episode, Doc Brown appeared to perform an experiment, often related to the episode's plot. The first season also included post-credits segments with Biff Tannen telling a joke related to the episode, alluding to Thomas F. Wilson's career as a stand-up comedian.

=== Board and card games ===
The Back to the Future: Back in Time board game was released in 2020. It is a fully cooperative game in which each player controls a character from the film and must collect items to help Marty McFly and Doc return from 1955 to their own time, as depicted in the first film in the trilogy.

In 2010, Looney Labs introduced Back to the Future: The Card Game, a strategy game using the same mechanics as the company's game Chrononauts (game). In the game, a timeline of cards is laid out in a grid with each era in the movies grouped together. Randomly distributed ID cards outline goals or timeline changes necessary to make sure the future character exists. The license for this game expired in 2012 and is no longer being produced.

=== Comic books ===
A comic book series was published by Harvey Comics in 1992 detailing further adventures of the animated series. Only seven issues were produced. IDW published a miniseries presenting the first meeting of Marty and Doc Brown, written by co-screenwriter Bob Gale, which was released in stores on October 21, 2015, the same date that Marty travels with Doc Brown to the future depicted in the storyline for Part II. In issue #3, it was revealed that it had become an ongoing monthly comic due to popular demand.

Beginning in issue #6, the original format of one or two untold stories per issue was replaced with a multi-issue ongoing story arc. The original subtitle for the comic, "Untold Tales and Alternate Timelines", was used for the trade paperback containing the first five comics in the series. The series has now progressed to what IDW calls "chapter 2" of the series with "Tales from the Time Train". This is a series of stories detailing where Doc and the Brown family went after time traveling at the end of Back to the Future Part III. Other miniseries published by IDW include "Citizen Brown", which adapts the Telltale video game, and "Biff to the Future", which depicts Biff Tannen's rise to power after being given the almanac by his future self. The latter is also co-written by Gale.

Transformers/Back to the Future is a four-issue crossover comic miniseries published by IDW Publishing to commemorate the 35th anniversaries of Back to the Future and Hasbro's Transformers franchise. It was published from October 7, 2020, to May 12, 2021.

=== Books ===
Each film in the trilogy also received a novelization that expanded on the movies by adding scenes, characters, and dialogue, often culled from early draft scripts.

In 2012, Hasslein Books released A Matter of Time: The Unauthorized Back to the Future Lexicon, written by Rich Handley. The book was released in cooperation with BTTF.com, the official Back to the Future website. A second volume, Back in Time: The Unauthorized Back to the Future Chronology, by Greg Mitchell and Rich Handley, was released in 2013.

Back to the Future: The Ultimate Visual History is an officially licensed book that includes 224 pages of behind-the-scenes stories, interviews, rare and never-before-seen images, concept art, storyboards, photos, and special removable replicas of paper items from the films. The book was written by Michael Klastorin, who was the production publicist on Back to the Future Part II and Part III. The book includes a foreword by Michael J. Fox, a preface by Christopher Lloyd, an introduction by Bob Gale, and an afterword by Robert Zemeckis. It was released on October 16, 2015, to coincide with Back to the Future Day, and was published by Titan Books in the UK and Harper Design in the US. It was reissued on November 3, 2020, with added content to commemorate the 35th anniversary of the trilogy.

A Japanese light novel adaptation was announced in August 2021.

=== Video games ===
Various video games based on the Back to the Future movies have been released over the years for home computers and video game systems.

Lego Dimensions (2015) features two Back to the Future–themed toy packs. The Level Pack adds a bonus level that adapts the events of the first film and includes a Marty McFly Minifigure, along with a constructible DeLorean and Hoverboard. The Fun Pack includes a Doc Brown Minifigure and a constructible Time Train from Part III. Both unlock access to an in-game open world set in Hill Valley. Michael J. Fox and Christopher Lloyd reprise their roles as Marty McFly and Emmett "Doc" Brown, respectively. A downloadable content pack for Planet Coaster (2016), titled the Back to the Future Time Machine Construction Kit, includes customizable in-game replicas of the DeLorean time machine.

In April 2023, it was announced that Back to the Future and characters from the films, including Marty and Doc, would be featured in the 2024 video game Funko Fusion.

==== Episodic video game ====
Back to the Future: The Game (2010) was released from December 22, 2010, to June 23, 2011, developed and published by Telltale Games. The game is an episodic graphic adventure and takes place in an alternate timeline based on the original trilogy. It was released as five episodes, with Christopher Lloyd reprising his role as Emmett "Doc" Brown, Claudia Wells reprising her role as Jennifer Parker, and Michael J. Fox making cameo appearances in the final episode. A.J. LoCascio provided the voice for Marty McFly, and Bob Gale assisted with the script. Thomas Wilson reprised his role as Biff Tannen in the 2015 re-release.

The plot of the video game depicts Marty traveling back to 1931 to help Doc, who is in trouble again. The video game depicts several trips by Marty and Doc back and forth from 1931 to the present, due to multiple disruptions to the timeline. In several separate, differing timelines, various altered outcomes are shown for the McFly family, and then separately for the entire Hill Valley region. At the conclusion of the game, the timeline is largely restored by Marty and Doc, although with some small differences from the "original" timeline.

=== Pinball ===
Two pinball adaptations of the film trilogy were released. The first was a physical machine produced by Data East, released in 1990 and titled Back to the Future: The Pinball. Over two decades later, Zen Studios developed and released a new digital pinball adaptation in 2017, available as add-on content for Pinball FX 3 along with two other tables based on iconic classic films from Universal Pictures, Jaws and E.T. The Extra-Terrestrial. The latter table behaves differently than the original Data East version and features 3-D animated figures and visual effects that are impossible to reproduce on a physical table.

=== Musical ===
Back to the Future: The Musical is a stage musical with original music and lyrics by Alan Silvestri and Glen Ballard, and a book adapted from the original screenplay by Robert Zemeckis and Bob Gale. The show features hit songs from the film, including "The Power of Love" and "Johnny B. Goode".

Originally slated to premiere in London's West End in 2015, the setting for the film characters in Part II, the production was delayed following the August 2014 departure of director Jamie Lloyd due to "creative differences" with Zemeckis. The show premiered at the Manchester Opera House in February 2020 ahead of an expected West End transfer. The March 11, 2022, release of the original cast recording preceded a Broadway production that opened August 3, 2023.

=== Automotive commercials ===
In 2015, Fox and Lloyd starred alongside popular YouTube science personality Go Tech Yourself in an extended Toyota commercial for Toyota's new fuel cell vehicle, the Mirai, titled Fueled by the Future. The commercial doubled as a tribute to the franchise and illustrated how converting trash into fuel had become a reality. The commercial was released on October 21—the same date to which Marty, Doc, and Jennifer traveled in Back to the Future Part II.

=== Theme park ride ===
Back to the Future: The Ride was a simulator ride based on the Back to the Future films and served as a mini-sequel to Back to the Future Part III. The original attraction opened on May 2, 1991, at Universal Studios Florida. It also opened on June 2, 1993, at Universal Studios Hollywood and on March 31, 2001, at Universal Studios Japan. The rides in the United States have since been replaced by The Simpsons Ride. The ride in Japan remained operational until May 31, 2016.

=== Documentaries ===
In the fall of 2015, after a successful Kickstarter project, the Back in Time documentary film was released. The film features interviews with cast and crew members and examines the trilogy's cultural impact 30 years later. In 2016, the OUTATIME: Saving the DeLorean Time Machine documentary film was released and presents the efforts of Bob Gale, Universal Studios, and a team of fans as they work to restore one of the original screen-used DeLorean time machines. Like the Back in Time documentary, OUTATIME was also successfully funded by a Kickstarter project. A 2021 documentary titled Expedition: Back to the Future featured Josh Gates and Christopher Lloyd searching for and restoring an original DeLorean used in the film, with appearances from several original cast members.
