= Back to the Future Part II =

1989 film by Robert Zemeckis

- Theatrical release poster by Drew Struzan
- Directed by: Robert Zemeckis
- Screenplay by: Bob Gale
- Story by: Robert Zemeckis; Bob Gale
- Based on: Characters by: Robert Zemeckis; Bob Gale
- Produced by: Bob Gale; Neil Canton
- Starring: Michael J. Fox; Christopher Lloyd; Lea Thompson; Thomas F. Wilson
- Cinematography: Dean Cundey
- Edited by: Arthur Schmidt; Harry Keramidas
- Music by: Alan Silvestri
- Production company: Amblin Entertainment
- Distributed by: Universal Pictures
- Release date: November 22, 1989
- Running time: 108 minutes
- Country: United States
- Language: English
- Budget: $40 million
- Box office: $333 million

Back to the Future Part II is a 1989 American science fiction film directed by Robert Zemeckis from a screenplay by Bob Gale; both conceived the story. It is a sequel to the 1985 film Back to the Future and the second installment in the Back to the Future franchise. The film stars Michael J. Fox, Christopher Lloyd, Lea Thompson and Thomas F. Wilson, with Elisabeth Shue (replacing Claudia Wells) and Jeffrey Weissman (replacing Crispin Glover) in supporting roles.

The film follows Marty McFly (Fox) and his friend Doctor Emmett "Doc" Brown (Lloyd) as they travel from 1985 to 2015 to prevent the former's son from tarnishing their family's future. When their arch-nemesis Biff Tannen (Wilson) steals the DeLorean time machine and uses it to alter history for his benefit, the duo must return to 1955 to set things right.

The film was produced on a $40 million budget and was filmed back-to-back with its sequel Part III. Filming began in February 1989, after two years were spent building the sets and writing the scripts. Back to the Future Part II was also a ground-breaking project for visual effects studio Industrial Light & Magic (ILM). In addition to digital compositing, ILM used the VistaGlide motion control camera system, which allowed an actor to portray multiple characters simultaneously on-screen without sacrificing camera movement.

Back to the Future Part II was released by Universal Pictures on November 22, 1989. Though the film received mostly positive reviews, it was deemed inferior to its predecessor by critics at the time of release. The film grossed $333 million worldwide in its initial run, making it the third-highest-grossing film of 1989. Part III followed on May 25, 1990, concluding the trilogy.

== Plot ==
On October 26, 1985, Dr. Emmett "Doc" Brown arrives unexpectedly in the DeLorean time machine, persuading Marty McFly and his girlfriend, Jennifer Parker, to travel to the future with him and help their future children. (Note: As depicted in Back to the Future (1985)) Once they arrive in 2015, Doc incapacitates Jennifer, leaving her asleep in an alley to avoid letting her learn about her own future. Doc explains that their son Marty Jr. will be arrested for participating in a robbery with Biff Tannen's grandson Griff, leading to a chain of events that destroys the McFly family.

Doc instructs Marty to switch places with the identical Marty Jr. and refuse Griff's offer, but Griff goads Marty into a fight by calling him "chicken", and a hoverboard chase ensues. Griff and his gang are arrested, saving Marty's future children. Before rejoining Doc, Marty purchases an almanac containing the results of major sporting events from 1950 to 2000. Doc discovers it and warns Marty about profiting from time travel. Before Doc can adequately dispose of it, they are interrupted by the police, who have found Jennifer incapacitated and are taking her to her 2015 home. They pursue, as does an elderly Biff, who has overheard their conversation and retrieved the discarded almanac.

Jennifer wakes up in her 2015 home and hides from the McFly family. She overhears that her future life with Marty is not what she expected, due to his involvement in an automobile accident, and witnesses Marty being goaded by his co-worker, Douglas Needles, into a shady business deal, resulting in his firing. Jennifer tries to escape the house but faints after encountering her future self. Meanwhile, unbeknownst to Marty and Doc, Biff steals the time machine and returns it. Marty and Doc return to 1985, leaving an unconscious Jennifer on her front porch to sleep off the day's events as a dream.

Marty gradually realizes that the 1985 they have returned to is not the one he knows. Biff, having used the almanac to secure a fortune, is now one of the country's wealthiest and most corrupt men. He has turned Hill Valley into a chaotic dystopia with a casino hotel, secretly killed Marty's father, George, in 1973, forced Marty's mother Lorraine to marry him, and sent Marty to boarding school in Switzerland. Meanwhile, this timeline's version of Doc has been committed to a mental hospital. Doc deduces that old Biff took the time machine to give his younger self the almanac, and Marty learns from the alternate 1985 Biff that he received it on November 12, 1955, the date Marty had recently visited. Biff, acting on his future self's advice, tries to kill Marty, who flees with Doc to 1955.

Marty secretly follows the 1955 Biff and watches him receive the almanac from his 2015 self. Marty then follows him to the high school dance, carefully avoiding interrupting the events from his previous visit, and being forced to intervene when Biff's gang goes after the other Marty performing onstage. Marty finally gets the almanac but loses it after being again goaded into a fight with Biff. Marty chases after Biff's car on the hoverboard, getting the almanac back as Biff is left to crash into a manure truck for the second time in a week.

Marty burns the almanac, nullifying the changes to the timeline that it had caused, as Doc hovers above in the time machine. Before Marty can join him, the DeLorean is struck by lightning and disappears, leaving Marty once again stranded in 1955. A Western Union courier arrives and delivers a letter to Marty from Doc, who tells him that the lightning strike transported him to 1885. Marty races back into town to find the 1955 Doc, who had just helped the other Marty to return to 1985. Shocked by Marty's sudden reappearance and that he is "back from the future", Doc faints.

== Cast ==
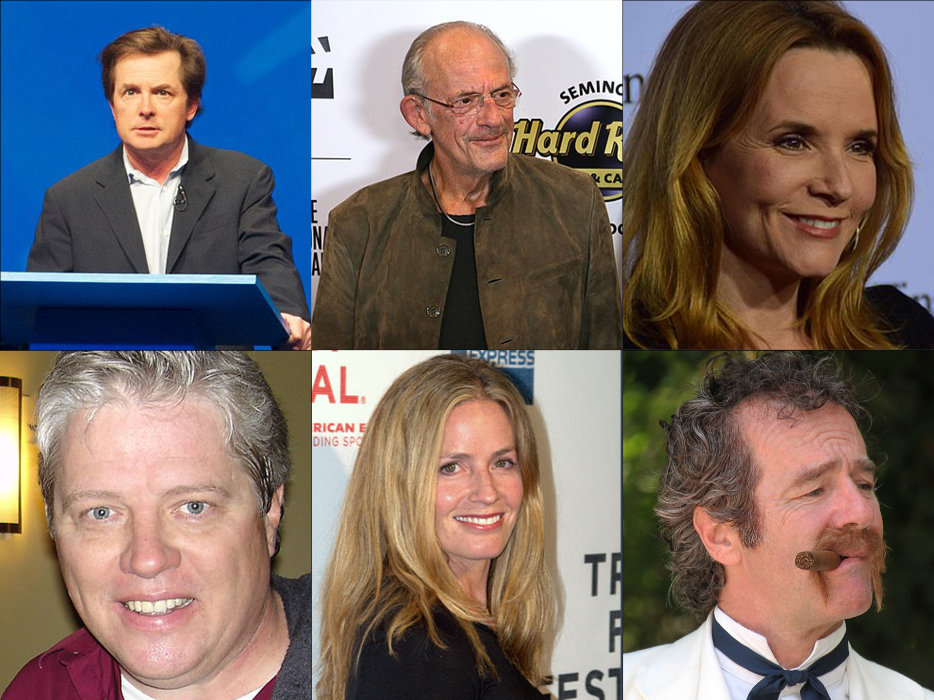
The cast of the film including (l–r, top row) Michael J. Fox, Christopher Lloyd, Lea Thompson, (bottom row) Thomas F. Wilson, Elisabeth Shue and Jeffrey Weissman

- Michael J. Fox as:
  - Marty McFly
  - Marty McFly Jr.
  - Marlene McFly
- Christopher Lloyd as Dr. Emmett Brown
- Lea Thompson as Lorraine Baines-McFly
- Thomas F. Wilson as:
  - Biff Tannen
  - Griff
  - Gertrude Tannen (voice)

Elisabeth Shue replaces Claudia Wells as Jennifer Parker and Jeffrey Weissman replaces Crispin Glover as George McFly, though Glover appears in archive footage from the first film. James Tolkan reprises his role as Mr. Strickland, as do Billy Zane, Casey Siemaszko and J. J. Cohen as Biff's cronies Match, 3-D, and Skinhead.

Griff's gang in 2015 includes Ricky Dean Logan as Data, Jason Scott Lee as Whitey and Darlene Vogel as Spike. Stephanie E. Williams plays Officer Foley, while Zemeckis' then-wife Mary Ellen Trainor has an uncredited role as Officer Reese. Flea appears as Marty's coworker Douglas J. Needles and James Ishida plays his boss Mr. Fujitsu. Donald Fullilove, who played Goldie Wilson in the first film, makes an uncredited appearance as his hovercar salesman grandson Goldie Wilson III. A young Elijah Wood is one of the two boys Marty teaches to play Wild Gunman.

In the alternate 1985, Al White portrays the patriarch of the family living in the McFly house. Neil Ross provides the voiceover for the Biff Tannen museum while George Buck Flower reprises his role as Red the Bum.

In 1955, Harry Waters Jr. reprises his role as Marvin Berry, Lisa Freeman reprises her role as Babs, John Erwin voices a radio newscaster, Wesley Mann plays a student who mistakes Marty for a thief, and Joe Flaherty plays the Western Union representative who delivers Doc's letter. Charles Fleischer plays Terry, who in 2015 indirectly gives Marty the idea to use time travel to bet on sports, and in 1955 is Biff's mechanic.

== Production ==
=== Development ===
Director Robert Zemeckis said that a sequel was not initially planned, but the first film's box office success led to the conception of a second installment. He later agreed to do a sequel, but only if Michael J. Fox and Christopher Lloyd returned as well. With Fox and Lloyd confirmed, Zemeckis met with screenwriting partner Bob Gale to create a story for the sequel. Zemeckis and Gale would later regret that they ended the first one with Jennifer in the car with Marty and Doc Brown, because it required them to come up with a story that would fit her in, rather than a whole new adventure.

Gale wrote most of the first draft by himself as Zemeckis was busy making Who Framed Roger Rabbit. At first, the film's third act was to take place in 1967 where Lorraine was a flower child protesting the war and George was a college professor at Berkeley, but Zemeckis later stated that the time paradoxes of it provided a good opportunity to go back to 1955 and see the first film's events in a different light. While most of the original cast agreed to return, a major stumbling block arose when negotiating Crispin Glover's fee for reprising the role of George McFly. When it became clear that he would not return, the role was rewritten so that George is dead when the action takes place in the alternative version of 1985.

The greatest challenge was the creation of the futuristic vision of Marty's hometown in 2015. Production designer Rick Carter wanted to create a very detailed image with a different tone from the film Blade Runner, wishing to get past the smoke and chrome. Carter and his crew spent months plotting, planning, and preparing Hill Valley's transformation into a city of the future. Visual effects art director John Bell said that they had no script to work with, only the indications that the setting would be 30 years into the future featuring "something called hoverboards".

When writing the script for Part II, Gale wanted to push the first film's ideas further for humorous effect. Zemeckis said he was somewhat concerned about portraying the future because of the risk of making wildly inaccurate predictions. According to Gale, they tried to make the future a nice place, "where what's wrong is due to who lives in the future as opposed to the technology" in contrast to the pessimistic, Orwellian future seen in most science fiction. Gale has stated that the characterization of the 1985 Biff took inspiration from Donald Trump. To keep production costs low and take advantage of an extended break Fox had from Family Ties (which was ending its run when filming began), it was shot back-to-back with sequel Part III.

=== Filming ===
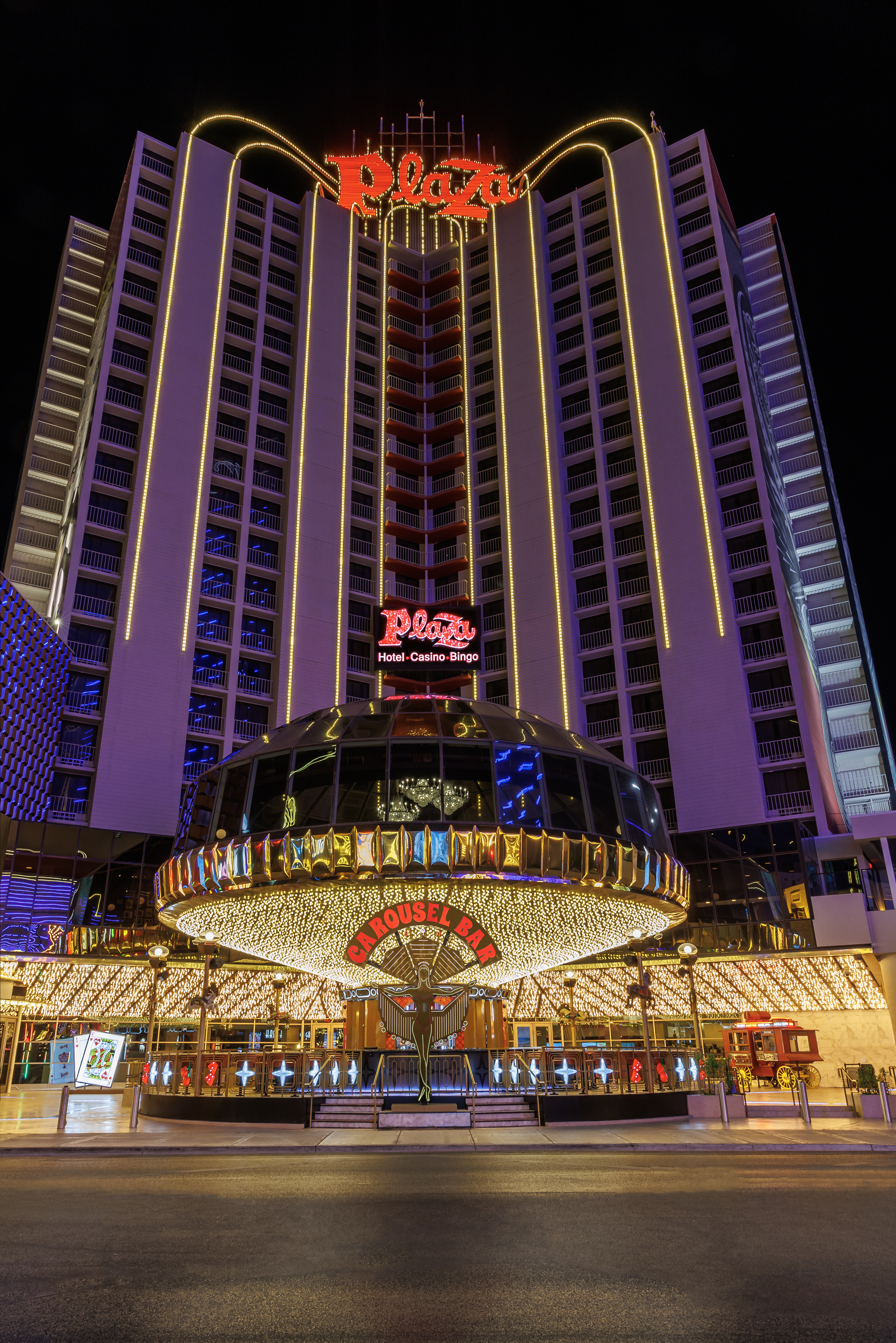
The building for Biff's casino was based on the Plaza Hotel & Casino in Las Vegas.

Two years were needed to finish building the sets and writing the scripts before shooting could begin. During filming, the creation of the appearance of the aged characters was a well-guarded secret, involving state-of-the-art make-up techniques. Fox described the process as very time-consuming, saying that "it took over four hours, although it could be worse". Principal photography began on February 20, 1989. Fox was pulling double duty, acting in the last season of Family Ties as filming began on the sequel. For a three-week period near the end of the filming, the crew split and, while most remained dedicated to shooting Part III, a few, including Gale, focused on finishing its predecessor. Zemeckis himself slept only a few hours per day, supervising both films, having to fly between Burbank, where it was being finished and other locations in California for Part III.

The film was considered one of the most ground-breaking projects for Industrial Light & Magic. It was one of the effects house's first forays into digital compositing, as well as the VistaGlide motion control camera system, which enabled them to shoot one of its most complex sequences, in which Fox played three separate characters (Marty Sr., Marty Jr., and Marlene), all of whom interacted with each other. Although such scenes were not new, the VistaGlide allowed, for the first time, a completely dynamic scene in which camera movement could finally be incorporated. The technique was also used in scenes where Fox, Thomas F. Wilson, Christopher Lloyd, and Elisabeth Shue's characters encounter and interact with their counterparts. It also includes a brief moment of computer-generated imagery in a holographic shark used to promote a fictional Jaws 19, which wound up unaltered from the first test done by ILM's digital department because effects supervisor Ken Ralston "liked the fact that it was all messed up."

Animation supervisor Wes Takahashi, who then was the head of ILM's animation department, worked heavily on the film's time travel sequences, as he had done in the original film and in Part III. As Part II neared release, sufficient footage of Part III had been shot to allow a trailer to be assembled. It was added to the conclusion of Part II before the closing credits, as a reassurance to moviegoers that there was more to follow.

The building for Biff Tannen's Pleasure Palace, the casino in the alternate 1985, was a scale model based on the Plaza Hotel & Casino in Las Vegas; the real-life casino later hosted an event for Back to the Future Day on October 21, 2015.

=== Replacement of Crispin Glover and lawsuit ===
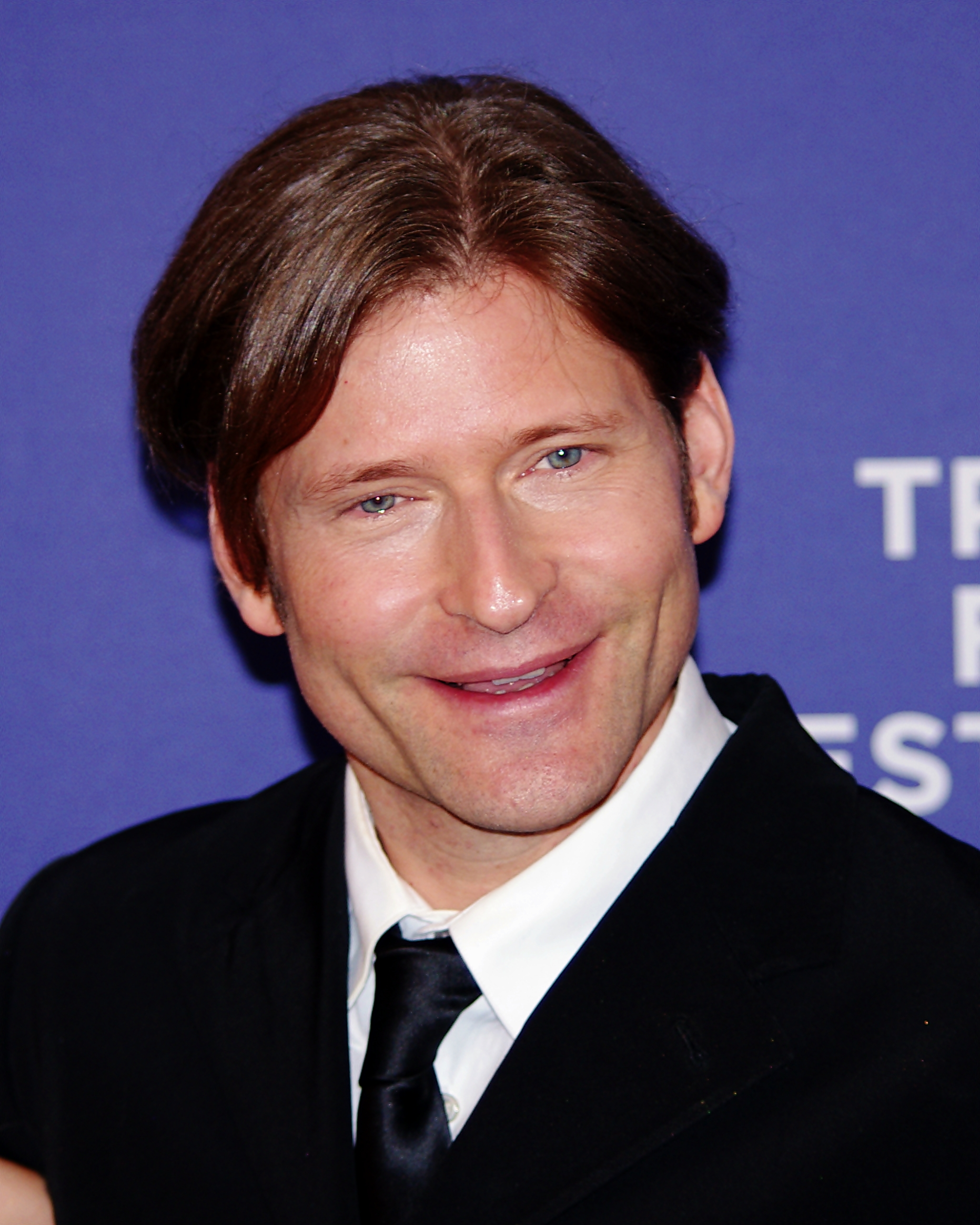
Crispin Glover (pictured in 2012) did not reprise his role as George McFly in Back to the Future Part II, and was replaced by Jeffrey Weissman.

Crispin Glover was asked to reprise the role of George McFly. He expressed interest, but could not come to an agreement with the producers regarding his salary. He stated in a 1992 interview on The Howard Stern Show that the producers' highest offer was $125,000, less than half of what the other returning cast members were offered. Gale has since asserted that Glover's demands were excessive for an actor of his professional stature at that time. In an interview on the Opie and Anthony show in 2013, Glover stated that his primary reason for not doing Part II was a philosophical disagreement on the film's message: Glover felt the story rewarded the characters with financial gain, such as Marty's truck, rather than love.

Rather than write George out of the film, Zemeckis used previously filmed footage of Glover from the first film as well as new footage of actor Jeffrey Weissman, who wore prosthetics including a false chin, nose, and cheekbones to resemble Glover. Various techniques were used to obfuscate the Weissman footage, such as placing him in the background rather than the foreground, having him wear sunglasses, and hanging him upside down. Glover would also learn from Weissman that the molds created from his face to make the aging prosthetics for 1985 George McFly in the first film were reused to make the prosthetics for Weissman's portrayal. Unhappy with this, Glover filed a lawsuit against the producers of the film on the grounds that they neither owned his likeness nor had permission to use it. As a result of the suit, there are now clauses in the Screen Actors Guild collective bargaining agreements stating that producers and actors are not allowed to use such methods to reproduce the likeness of other actors. Glover's legal action, while resolved outside of the courts, has been considered as a key case in personality rights for actors with increasing use of improved special effects and digital techniques, in which actors may have agreed to appear in one part of a production but have their likenesses be used in another without their agreement.

=== Replacement of Claudia Wells ===
The closing scene of Back to the Future with Claudia Wells (above) was reshot for the opening of Part II with Elisabeth Shue (below).

Claudia Wells planned to reprise her role as Marty's girlfriend Jennifer Parker, but when filming coincided with a family cancer crisis, she chose to care for her mother's health. After the producers cast Elisabeth Shue as a replacement, they re-shot the closing scenes of the first film for the beginning of Part II, in a nearly shot-for-shot match with the original.

Wells returned to acting with a starring role in the 2008 independent film Still Waters Burn. She is one of the few cast members not to make an appearance within the bonus material on the Back to the Future Trilogy DVD set released in 2002. However, she is interviewed for the Tales from the Future documentaries in the trilogy's 25th anniversary issue on Blu-ray Disc in 2010. Wells would also later reprise her role from the first film, 26 years after her last appearance in the series, providing the voice of Jennifer for Back to the Future: The Game by Telltale Games in 2011.

=== Hoverboard hoax ===
Zemeckis said jokingly on the film's behind-the-scenes featurette that the hoverboards (flying skateboards) used in it were real, yet not released to the public, due to parental complaints regarding safety. Footage of "real hoverboards" was also featured in the extras of a DVD release of the trilogy. A number of people thought Zemeckis was telling the truth and requested them at toy stores. In an interview, Wilson said one of the most frequent questions he was asked was whether they were real.

== Depiction of the future ==
Although the filmmakers researched contemporary predictions by scientists on what might occur by 2015, Zemeckis has said that the film was not meant to be a serious attempt at predicting the future. In 2010, he commented: "For me, filming the future scenes of the movie were the least enjoyable of making the whole trilogy, because I don't really like films that try and predict the future. The only ones I've actually enjoyed were the ones done by Stanley Kubrick, and not even he predicted the PC when he made A Clockwork Orange. So, rather than trying to make a scientifically sound prediction that we were probably going to get wrong anyway, we figured, let's just make it funny". Similarly, Gale said: "We knew we weren't going to have flying cars by the year 2015, but God we had to have those in our movie".

However, the film did correctly predict a number of technological and sociological changes that occurred by 2015, including: the rise of ubiquitous cameras; use of unmanned flying drones for newsgathering; widescreen flat-panel television sets mounted on walls with multiple channel viewing; smart home technology; video chat systems; hands-free video games; talking animated billboards; wearable technology; tablet computers with fingerprint scanners and head-mounted displays. Payment on personal portable devices is also depicted. Although payment by thumbprint was not widely used in 2015, fingerprint scanning was in use as security at places such as airports and schools, and electronic payment with fingerprint scanning as a security feature deployed for Apple Pay.

Other aspects of the depiction of the future would not come to pass by 2015, but efforts were made to replicate those technology advances.

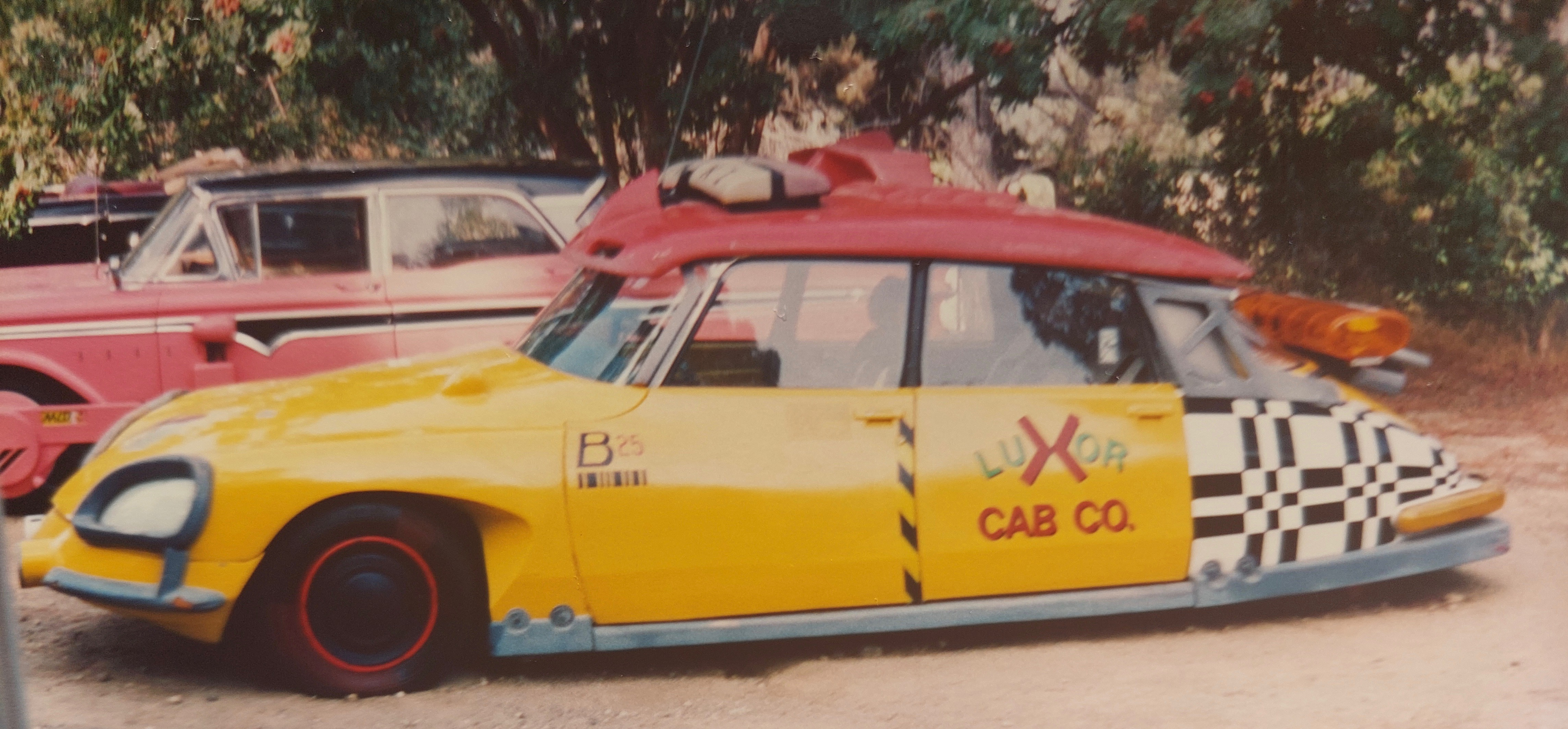
The Luxor Taxi based on the 1972 Citroën DS

The film shows Marty putting on Nike "Air Mag" tennis shoes with automatic shoelaces. Nike released a version of its Hyperdunk Supreme shoes, which appear similar to Marty's, in July 2008. Fans dubbed them the Air McFly. In April 2009, Nike filed the patent for self-lacing shoes, and its design bears a resemblance to those worn by Marty in the film. In 2010, a fan named Blake Bevin created shoes that tie themselves. Though Nike had made a very limited quantity of Air Mags in the same style as the movie, the company stated in September 2011 that its consumer-line MAG line of shoes would not feature the self-lacing feature shown in it. Tinker Hatfield, one of the shoe's designers, indicated in 2014 that it would introduce shoes with power-lacing technology the following year, 2015. In March 2016, Nike unveiled the HyperAdapt 1.0 shoe, a consumer-market model of the Air Mag which features the same self-lacing technology used for the commemorative Air Mags; these were put on sale in limited quantities in late 2016.

The producers created a futuristic flying car to depict a typical taxi cab in the future world of 2015. This taxi was based on the Citroën DS.

The concept of the hoverboard—a skateboard that can float off the ground—has been explored by various groups since the release of the film. Attempts similar to hoverboats, which blast air at the ground, have been demonstrated, with a 2021 record distance of 275 meters (902 ft). A different type is the MagBoard, developed by researchers at the Paris Diderot University. It uses a large superconductor plate on the bottom cooled with liquid nitrogen as to achieve the Meissner effect and allow it to float over a special track; it was shown capable of carrying the weight of a human in its practical demonstration. However, the requirement to run the superconductor at higher, more ambient temperatures prevents this from becoming practical. In March 2014, a company named HUVr Tech purportedly demonstrated a working hoverboard along with several celebrities including Lloyd, though this shortly was revealed as a hoax created by the website Funny or Die. Self-balancing "hoverboards" became popular in 2015 even though they do not hover above the ground.

In the 2015 scene, the film imagines the Chicago Cubs winning the 2015 World Series against the fictional Miami-based Gators, referring to the Cubs' longstanding failure to win a championship. In the actual 2015 season, the Cubs qualified for the postseason, their first postseason appearance since 2008, but lost the National League Championship Series (not the World Series) to the New York Mets on October 21, which coincidentally was the same day as "Back to the Future Day", the day Marty McFly arrived in 2015 in the film. Despite losing, one year later the Cubs did win the 2016 World Series against the Cleveland Indians; in congratulations to the Cubs, the official Twitter feed for the Back to the Future franchise jokingly tweeted out that Marty & Doc's time-traveling caused "a rift in the space-time continuum" that led to the 1994 strike (and subsequent cancellation of the 1994 World Series), thus delaying the accurate prediction by a year. In the real 2015 World Series, the Kansas City Royals defeated the Mets to win their first World Series championship since 1985, the year which Marty and Doc time traveled in the film. As for the fictional Miami team, when the film was made, Florida did not have a Major League Baseball team, but has since gained two: the Florida Marlins (now the Miami Marlins) in 1993 and Tampa Bay Devil Rays (now the Tampa Bay Rays) in 1998. While both teams have each made two appearances in the World Series (the Marlins winning in 1997 and 2003, and the Rays losing in 2008 and 2020), neither qualified for the postseason in 2015. Another sport mentioned in the film, SlamBall, would indeed become a real sport in 2002.

== Release and reception ==
=== Box office ===
The film was released to theaters in North America on Wednesday, November 22, 1989, the day before Thanksgiving. It grossed a total of $27.8 million over Friday to Sunday, and $43 million across the five-day holiday opening, breaking the previous Thanksgiving record set by Rocky IV in 1985. On the following weekend, it had a drop of 56 percent, earning $12.1 million, but remained at number 1. Its total gross was $118.5 million in the United States and $213 million overseas, for a total of $333 million worldwide, ranking as 1989's sixth-most successful film domestically and the third-most worldwide—behind Indiana Jones and the Last Crusade and Batman. However this was still short of the first film's gross. Part III, which Universal released only six months later, experienced a similar drop. In Japan, it had a record opening, grossing $7.5 million in six days from 153 screens.

=== Critical response ===
On Rotten Tomatoes, the film holds an approval rating of 63% based on 63 reviews, with an average rating of 6.2/10. The website's critics consensus reads: "Back to the Future II is far more uneven than its predecessor, but its madcap highs outweigh the occasionally cluttered machinations of an overstuffed plot". On Metacritic, the film has a weighted average score of 57 out of 100, based on 17 critics, indicating "mixed or average" reviews. Audiences polled by CinemaScore gave the film an average grade of "A−" on an A+ to F scale.

Roger Ebert of the Chicago Sun-Times gave the film three out of four stars. Ebert criticized it for lacking the "genuine power of the original" but praised it for its "zaniness" and "screwball jokes". Janet Maslin of The New York Times wrote that the film is "ready for bigger and better things" and later said that it "manages to be giddily and merrily mind-boggling, rather than confusing". Tom Tunney of Empire magazine wrote that the film was well-directed, "high-energy escapism", and called it "solidly entertaining", though noting it as being inferior to the other two films in the franchise.

Jonathan Rosenbaum of the Chicago Reader gave the film a negative review, criticizing Zemeckis and Gale for turning the characters into "strident geeks" and for making the frenetic action formulaic. He believed that it contained "rampant misogyny", because the character of Jennifer Parker "is knocked unconscious early on so she won't interfere with the little-boy games". He cited, as well, Michael J. Fox dressing in drag. Variety said, "[Director Robert] Zemeckis' fascination with having characters interact at different ages of their lives hurts it visually, and strains credibility past the breaking point, by forcing him to rely on some very cheesy makeup designs".

In 2018, Bob Gale, who co-wrote the movie with Robert Zemeckis, said the movie received a mixed reception because of the dark aspect of the story: "They [the audiences] were absolutely surprised by it. The whole 1985 stuff... we went places the audience was not ready to go. That is some of my favorite stuff in the whole trilogy".

=== Accolades ===
The film won the Saturn Award for Best Special Effects (for Ken Ralston, the special effects supervisor), the BAFTA Award for Best Special Visual Effects (Ken Ralston, Michael Lantieri, John Bell and Steve Gawley), an Internet-voted 2003 AOL Movies DVD Premiere Award for the trilogy DVDs, a Golden Screen Award, a Young Artist Award, and the Blimp Awards for Favorite Movie Actor (Michael J. Fox), and Favorite Movie Actress (Lea Thompson) at the 1990 Kids' Choice Awards. It was nominated in 1990 for an Academy Award for Best Visual Effects (John Bell, Steve Gawley, Michael Lantieri and Ken Ralston), but lost to The Abyss.

=== Home media ===
The film was released on VHS and LaserDisc on May 22, 1990, three days before the theatrical release of Part III. It was due to be the first release under the MCA/Universal Home Video banner. On December 17, 2002, Universal released it on DVD in a boxed trilogy set, although widescreen framing problems led to a product recall.

Universal re-released the trilogy alongside new features on DVD and Blu-ray on October 20, 2015, coinciding with Back to the Future Day the following day. The new set included a featurette called "Doc Brown Saves the World", where Lloyd, reprising his role as Doc Brown, explains the reasons for the differences between the future of 2015 as depicted in Back to the Future Part II and in real life. A new remaster as part of Back to the Future: The Ultimate Trilogy on Blu-ray and Ultra HD Blu-ray was released on October 20, 2020.

In May 2020, the trilogy was released for streaming on Netflix. A small edit was noticed to Part II during the scene featuring the fictional soft porn magazine called Oh La La! in which the shot showing the reveal of the magazine cover is cut short, omitting sight of the magazine itself. Gale stated that neither he nor Zemeckis were aware of this change, and believed it originated from a foreign print of the film. Shortly afterwards, Universal provided Netflix with the unedited, theatrical version of the film, replacing the censored cut on the streaming platform.

== Music ==
The soundtrack was released by MCA Records on November 22, 1989. AllMusic rated it four-and-a-half stars out of five. Unlike the previous soundtrack, it contains only a musical score composed and conducted by Alan Silvestri and performed by the Hollywood Studio Symphony. None of the vocal songs featured throughout the film are included. On October 12, 2015, Intrada Records released the complete score of Back to the Future Part II in a 2-disc set including early scoring sessions and alternative takes.

== See also ==
- List of 1989 box office number-one films in the United States
- List of films featuring drones
