= Marty McFly =

Back to the Future protagonist

- Back to the Future character
- Michael J. Fox as Marty McFly in Back to the Future (1985)
- First appearance: Back to the Future (1985)
- Created by: Robert Zemeckis; Bob Gale
- Portrayed by: Michael J. Fox (films; 1985–90); Olly Dobson (stage musical); Eric Stoltz (original; unreleased)
- Voiced by: Mark Campbell (singing voice; Part I); David Kaufman (The Animated Series); A. J. LoCascio (The Game); Michael J. Fox (The Game, Lego Dimensions)

In-universe information
- Full name: Martin Seamus McFly
- Aliases: Calvin Klein; Darth Vader; Clint Eastwood
- Nickname: Marty
- Occupation: High school student
- Family: George McFly (father); Lorraine Baines (mother); Dave McFly (brother); Linda McFly (sister); William McFly (great-grandfather); Seamus McFly (great-great grandfather); Maggie McFly (great-great grandmother)
- Spouse: Jennifer Parker
- Children: Marty Jr. (son); Marlene (daughter)
- Origin: October 4th, 1968, Friday: Marty McFly is born in Hill Valley, California, to George and Lorraine McFly.
- Nationality: American

Martin Seamus McFly is a fictional character and the protagonist of the Back to the Future franchise. He is a high school student living in the fictional town of Hill Valley, California, who accidentally becomes a time traveler and alters history after his scientist friend Emmett Brown invents a DeLorean time machine. He was created by Robert Zemeckis and Bob Gale. In the film trilogy, he is portrayed by Canadian actor Michael J. Fox. Back to the Future established Fox as a film star, such was the commercial success and popularity of the film upon its release in 1985. Marty returned in two film sequels, Back to the Future Part II in 1989 and Back to the Future Part III in 1990.

During the development of Back to the Future, Eric Stoltz was initially cast in the role, but was replaced by Fox. Various other actors have portrayed or voiced the character in other media. In the animated series, David Kaufman voices him, and in the video game developed and published by Telltale Games, he is voiced by A.J. LoCascio, while Fox makes vocal cameos as his future counterparts. Olly Dobson played him in the original stage musical adaptation in the West End and Casey Likes plays him in the Broadway production.

Critics have described Marty as a film character that defined the 1980s. He was named one of the greatest movie characters of all time by Empire. Critics have also described him as a pop culture icon. Since the release of Back to the Future, he has been influential in other media, often being referenced in television and film.

== Development ==
=== Concept and creation ===
The concept for Back to the Future originated in co-creators Robert Zemeckis and Bob Gale wanting to make a film about time travel. Gale said that the story evolved after he found his father's old high school year book and asked himself "Would we have been friends if we'd been at school together?" He considered the realization that parents were once young and also contemplated the idea that people are in charge of their own destinies. Gale and Zemeckis shared a fascination with the way that the future was often depicted in the wrong way in media and thought it would be cool to write a film in which the character changed history.

Gale and Zemeckis started to contemplate the concept while working on Used Cars (1980). They decided that it was impossible to answer the question of whether they would have hung out with their parents because their perception of them as parents could never change. After outlining the story concept, they spent time filling in the details of the McFly family through history. They used index cards pinned to a bulletin board to define each scene and then worked out the details and dialogue. Part of the process involved defining what a young person in the 1980s would take for granted and they used this as the basis for the jokes, which center on the cultural differences between the eras. This proved challenging as neither of them had grown up in the 1950s or the 1980s.

In the early drafts of the script, Doc Brown's technology caused the whole world to change instead of just Marty's family but this idea was rejected. Gale stated that Marty was named after a production assistant on Used Cars because it seemed like a "good, all-American name". Zemeckis then suggested the surname McFly. It took some time to work out how Marty would travel in time, but they knew it had to be by accident rather than for some personal gain. In the first two drafts of the script, many elements of the story were different to the final version and featured a time chamber instead of the DeLorean time machine. Marty was characterized as a "streetwise video pirate", but Zemeckis said that Universal Pictures refused to make a film with a video pirate as the protagonist. Some elements had to be changed or abandoned, such as a joke about Marty's long hair, which was removed due to changes in 1980s hairstyles. Zemeckis said that Marty's encounter with his teenage mother in 1955 was always the most difficult part of the film and they spent a long time trying to get it right.

When they pitched the story, it was rejected over 40 times as it was considered too sweet, although it was also rejected by Disney due to concerns over the subplot involving Marty's relationship with his mother. Others considered that a story about time travel would not make any money. The project was eventually taken on by Steven Spielberg at his production company Amblin Entertainment as he had always believed in the success of the project.

=== Casting and filming ===
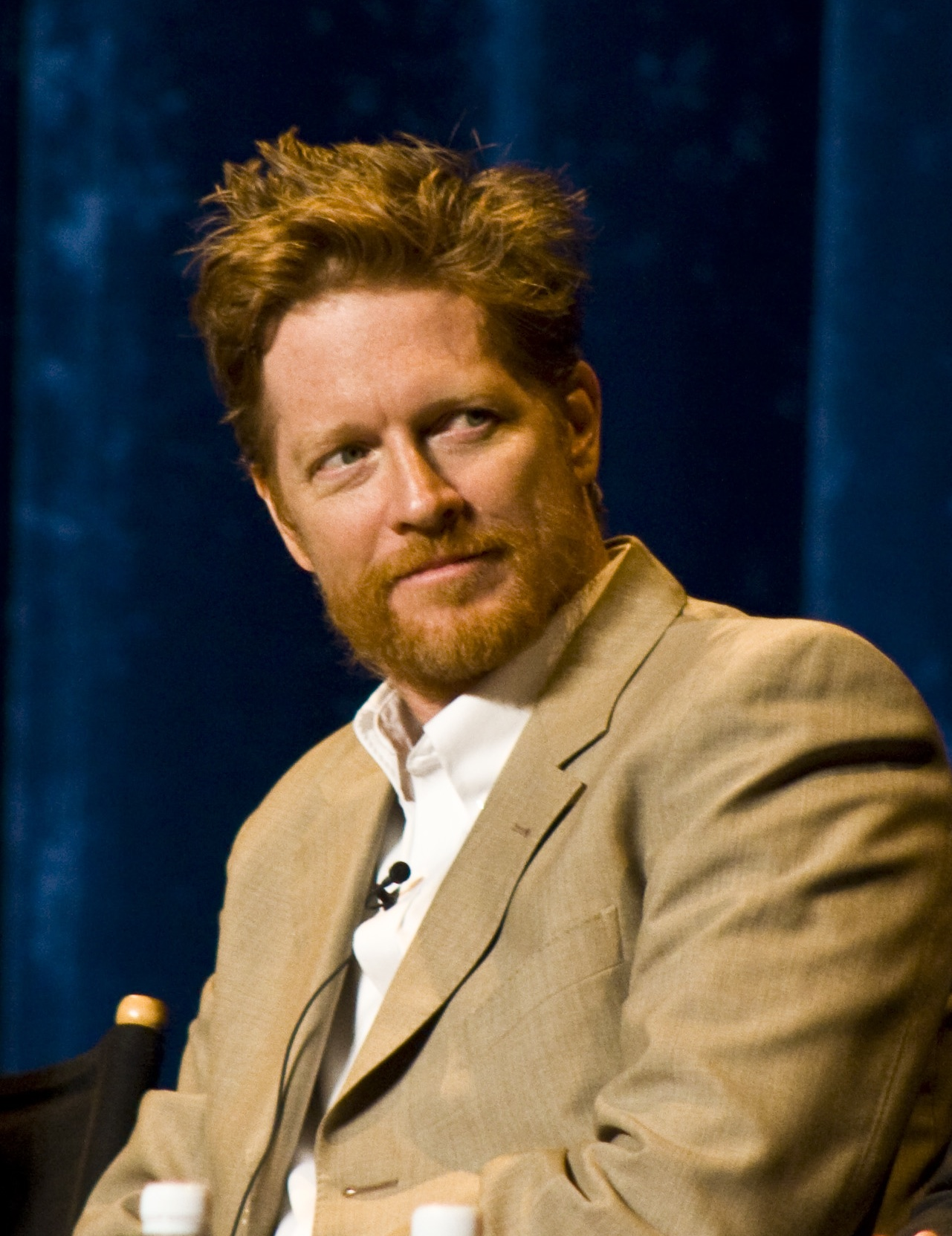
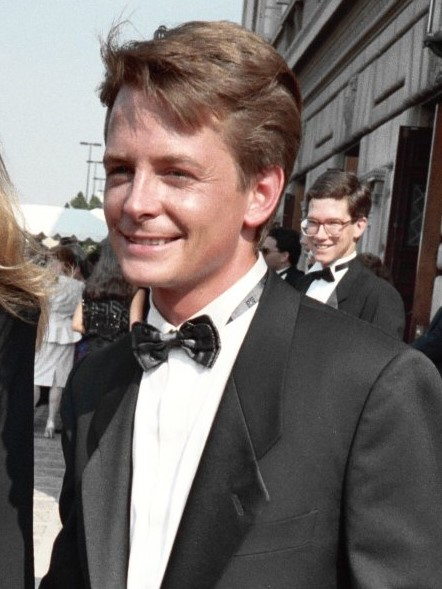
Eric Stoltz (left) was originally cast in the role of Marty but was replaced by Michael J. Fox (right) five weeks into filming.

Michael J. Fox was the first choice for Zemeckis when casting the role of Marty McFly in Back to the Future, as he had seen him starring in the television series Family Ties in the part of Alex Keaton. Fox was still under contract causing concern about his filming availability, so producer Gary Michael Goldberg did not give him the script. Various young actors auditioned for the part of Marty, including Jon Cryer, Billy Zane, Ben Stiller, C. Thomas Howell, Johnny Depp, John Cusack, Charlie Sheen, Matthew Modine, Ralph Macchio, Peter DeLuise, George Newbern, Robert Downey Jr., Christopher Collet, and Corey Hart (who declined to audition). Ralph Macchio also missed out on the role due to concerns that his New York accent and East Coast ethnicity were not the right fit for Marty's "all-American quality". Eric Stoltz was eventually cast as Marty and used method acting, insisting that the film crew call him "Marty" even when not filming. His intense, serious acting style clashed with the light, comedic portrayal that Zemeckis and Gale were expecting from the part. According to Gale, Stoltz portrayed Marty with the approach that he would feel miserable over how his family changes and this underpinned his performance. After reviewing 40 minutes of footage, Spielberg, Zemeckis and Gale knew it was a problem. Despite making the decision to fire Stoltz, filming continued into January 1985, with Stoltz filming the scene at the Twin Pines mall with Christopher Lloyd. Five weeks into shooting, Zemeckis replaced Stoltz with Fox. By that time, Universal Pictures had already negotiated the filming schedule for Fox around his commitment to Family Ties. Zemeckis personally took the responsibility of giving the news to Stoltz, stating that it was "the hardest meeting I've ever had in my life and it was all my fault. I broke his heart". Gale explained that the recasting did not reflect on Stoltz's acting abilities, but they had just cast the wrong person.

With Fox in the role, Zemeckis had to reshoot the previous five weeks of filming with a new leading man. Fox was 23 years old when he took on the role of 17-year-old Marty in 1985. The producers were impressed by Fox's sense of timing and comic ability. Zemeckis commented, "He's got the perfect blend of traditional leading man qualities. He's vulnerable but he's calm." As Fox had joined the production after filming had begun, he was forced to juggle filming of both the film and television series within a punishing schedule. This involved rehearsals for Family Ties from 10am until 6pm followed by filming Back to the Future from 6.30pm until 2.30am. Fox stated that the schedule was exhausting but worth the effort. Fox exclaimed that he could play Marty McFly in his sleep and wrote, "that very nearly turned out to be the case". His presence changed the atmosphere on set and he had a good rapport with Lloyd. Gale said that as well as being a good actor and having a natural comedic ability, Fox "gave the actors more to work with". Lloyd said that although he was worried about the replacement, he had a natural chemistry with Fox and found it easy to work with him. Fox assumed that his exhaustion would result in a poor performance and damage his career, but instead his anxieties benefited his portrayal of Marty: "I barely knew where I was, and I didn't really know what I was doing. That served the film because Marty's supposed to be disoriented." For a scene in which Marty plays a cover version of the song "Johnny B. Goode" by Chuck Berry at a school dance, Fox had to be taught to play guitar by Paul Hanson. Fox recalled that he also could not dance, so he worked with a choreographer in order to move like a rock star. He wanted to incorporate all of the mannerisms of his favorite guitarists, including "a Pete Townshend windmill, and Jimi Hendrix behind the back, and a Chuck Berry duck walk". Although Fox mimed the guitar playing and lip-synced the song in the scene, it was Tim May who played guitar, while the vocals were provided by Mark Campbell. Marty's skateboarding sequences were choreographed by professional skateboarders Per Welinder and Bob Schmelze, who also taught Fox, Stoltz and their stunt doubles the skateboarding techniques.

While filming a scene for the third film, which involves Marty being strung up in a noose by Buford "Mad Dog" Tannen and his gang, the stunt almost went seriously wrong. In his 2002 autobiography, Lucky Man: A Memoir, Fox recalled that he stood on a box for the first two takes as the shot only filmed the upper part of his body. When the scene failed to look realistic, he decided to try the stunt without the box. As a result, the rope blocked his carotid artery and caused him to lose consciousness for several seconds until Zemeckis realised that he was not acting. This incident later led Fox to contemplate whether his developing symptoms were related to the hanging before he was diagnosed with Parkinson's disease.

== Characteristics ==
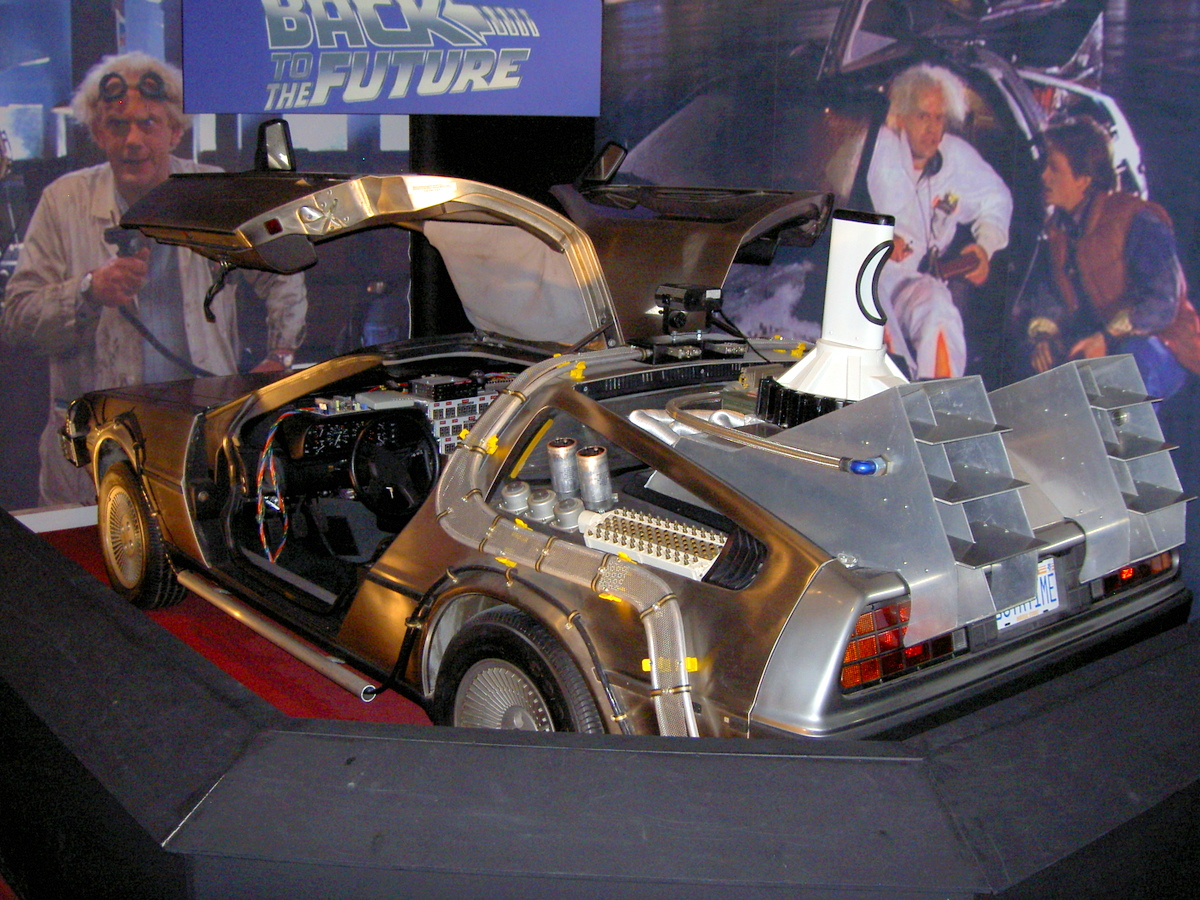
The DeLorean time machine on display with images of Marty and his friend Emmett Brown at the rear

Marty McFly is the Back to the Future protagonist, who is raised in Hill Valley, California, a fictional town set in 1985. He is a confident teenager who attends high school and dreams of becoming a rock star. He also lives in a family with various personal issues. He is the youngest of three children of George McFly and Lorraine Baines-McFly. He has a brother, Dave McFly, and a sister, Linda McFly. Marty's girlfriend is Jennifer Parker and his best friend is Emmett Brown, a scientist Marty and Jennifer call "Doc". In the third film, Marty meets his great-great paternal grandparents, Seamus and Maggie, who were Irish immigrants in 1885. He also meets their infant son William, Marty's great-grandfather. Despite never explicitly being explained in the film, Gale confirmed that Marty met his friend Doc Brown when he was around 14 after hearing that Brown was a dangerous lunatic. Marty was curious, so he snuck into Doc's lab and was fascinated by his inventions. Doc allowed him to help with his experiments and their friendship began. In the first film, Doc Brown introduces Marty to the time machine that he invented using a DMC Delorean, which Marty uses to time travel when the vehicle reaches 88 miles per hour.

=== Personality ===
In Back to the Future, Marty is shown to be disappointed by his family, particularly his wimpish father and alcoholic mother. Marty enjoys playing electric guitar with his group The Pinheads and plays "The Power of Love" at a Battle of the Bands audition as his favorite band is Huey Lewis and the News. This ability gives him the opportunity to take the lead in 1955 when stepping in for Marvin at the Enchantment Under the Sea Dance, where he shows the fictitious R&B band named Marvin Berry and the Starlighters the chord changes for "Johnny B. Goode". He is a talented skateboarder, often clinging onto the back of vehicles to gain extra speed when he is late for school. He also proves to be an excellent pistol shot, a skill he has honed by playing shooting games such as Wild Gunman.

Marty's carefree attitude results in confrontations with his high school's vice-principal Mr. Strickland, who calls him a "slacker", comparing him to his father. After Strickland warns him against associating with Doc Brown and claims that no McFly ever amounted to anything, Marty shows determination, stating that he will change history. When confronted with a challenging circumstance, Marty often uses the catchphrase "This is heavy!" He frequently loses his temper whenever he is accused of cowardice. For the sequels, Gale said that they wanted to establish a character flaw for Marty that he has to overcome and realised that he is a "hothead", as demonstrated when he quickly becomes involved in a confrontation with the bully Biff Tannen. Gale said that this character flaw was then verbalised in Marty's catchphrase, "Nobody calls me chicken!", which he described as Marty's "Achilles' heel". Marty eventually learns a valuable lesson about choosing to walk away from a fight and refuses a driving race challenge that could have caused his death.

Marty frequently uses pop culture references, particularly when adopting aliases throughout the Back to the Future series. In the first film, soon after waking up in the bedroom of Lorraine in 1955, he adopts the name "Calvin Klein" after she starts calling him that due to it being Marty's brand of underwear. In the French dub of Back to the Future, the name Calvin Klein was replaced by Pierre Cardin, after the French fashion designer. He also uses the alias "Darth Vader, an extraterrestrial from the Planet Vulcan", thereby confusing Star Wars with Star Trek, while wearing a radiation suit to attempt to coerce George into asking Lorraine out to the dance. In the third film, he uses the name "Clint Eastwood" after traveling back to 1885. He also mimics the tough guy personas of Travis Bickle played by Robert De Niro in Taxi Driver and Dirty Harry played by Eastwood while practising with a pistol.

=== Physical appearance ===
In Back to the Future, Marty's clothing reflects the fashion of 1985. He wears a pair of Levi's jeans, paired with a buttoned shirt, a denim jacket with a puffer jacket on top and a pair of Nike Bruin shoes. In 1955, he wears a camp shirt, two-tone jacket and denim, later changing to a check jacket and tie. After time traveling with Doc Brown in the second film and arriving in the future on October 21, 2015, Marty wears a more futuristic outfit to blend in with the fashion of the era. His updated look features wearable technology, including a self-drying bomber jacket combined with jeans that have pockets worn on the outside and sneakers with automatic self-lacing technology. His skateboard is also replaced by a hoverboard. In the third film, after time traveling back to the year 1885, his outfit features a poncho and hat in a similar style to the Man with No Name, a film character portrayed by Eastwood.

== Appearances ==
=== Back to the Future films ===
==== Back to the Future ====
In 1985, eccentric scientist Emmett "Doc" Brown invites Marty to join him at the Twin Pines Mall, where he shows him a time machine that he has invented out of a DeLorean. After inputting the date November 5, 1955, Libyan terrorists arrive and shoot him, as Doc Brown had used plutonium to power the DeLorean instead of building a nuclear weapon for them. During this exchange, Marty escapes from them in the time machine, accidentally traveling back to 1955 by reaching 88 miles per hour. There, he gets knocked over by a car in the place of his teenage father, George, which disrupts how his parents meet. After waking up in the bedroom of his teenage mother, Lorraine, she develops a crush on him. Marty contacts the younger version of Doc Brown and enlists his help to reunite his parents and travel back to 1985. He attempts to convince George to ask Lorraine out to the Enchantment Under the Sea dance, where they are fated to kiss for the first time. In the process, he draws the attention of bully Biff Tannen, who frequently bullies George. Marty concocts a plan with George in which he will rescue Lorraine from Marty's advances while they are parked in a car during the night of the dance in order to win her affections. That night Biff appears on the scene, taking Marty's place in the car. When George finds Biff with Lorraine, he finally gains the courage to stand up to him and knocks him out with a punch, securing Lorraine's affections. At the dance, Marty joins the band on stage and plays guitar, which results in George and Lorraine making their first kiss. Marty arrives at the Hill Valley clocktower in time to complete Doc Brown's plan to send him back to the future by using a lightning strike as a power source for the DeLorean. The plan is successful and Marty travels back to 1985. There he finds that his exploits in the past have changed the future, as George is a novelist and Biff is reduced to an auto detailer. He discovers that Doc Brown is still alive having worn a bulletproof vest after Marty warned him about his fate in 1955.

==== Back to the Future Part II ====
Doc Brown transports Marty and Jennifer to October 21, 2015, in the DeLorean to help their children, but Biff witnesses their departure. Their future selves have married, and their teenage son, Marty Jr., will be arrested for getting involved in a robbery with Griff, Biff's grandson, and their daughter Marlene will also be arrested for attempting to break her brother out of prison. Jennifer is knocked unconscious by Doc Brown and left asleep while Marty disguises himself as Marty Jr. and comes into contact with the elder Biff. Marty refuses Griff's offer and gets into a hoverboard dash, resulting in Griff and his crew getting arrested instead of Marty Jr. After being left behind in 2015, Jennifer is identified by her fingerprints and taken to her future residence by the police. While hiding in the house, she learns from her future family that Marty's life was ruined by a Rolls-Royce collision after he was goaded into a street race by his high school rival, Douglas J. Needles. Marty and Doc Brown rescue her while, unbeknownst to them, elder Biff steals their time machine and returns to 1955, where he gives his younger self a sports almanac from the future to use for gambling. When Marty returns to 1985, he discovers that Hill Valley is now a polluted, crime-ridden dystopia, with Biff becoming extraordinarily rich and corrupt. He had forcefully married Marty's mother, Lorraine, after secretly murdering Marty's father in 1973. He also legalized gambling in the process, becoming known as the "Luckiest Man on Earth", and sent Marty off to boarding school in Switzerland. Marty and Doc Brown return to 1955 again to steal the almanac back from Biff. At the high school dance, Marty tracks down the almanac in young Biff's possession while trying to avoid his other self. After a chase down a tunnel on his hoverboard, Marty succeeds in retrieving it from Biff. On Doc's advice, Marty burns the almanac so headlines brought from the alternate 1985 revert to the present they recognize. Doc Brown is accidentally transported back to 1885 after lightning strikes the DeLorean, leaving Marty stranded. Marty immediately receives a letter from Doc Brown, written on September 1, 1885, which informs him that he has traveled back to the Old West. Marty then seeks the help of the 1955 version of Doc Brown.

==== Back to the Future Part III ====
Marty finds the 1955 version of Doc Brown and informs him of the previous events. Using the letter that Doc Brown sent from 1885, they find the DeLorean hidden in a mineshaft, but also discover a tombstone with Doc Brown's name on it. This reveals that he was shot and killed by Buford "Mad Dog" Tannen six days after he wrote the letter. Marty decides to travel back to 1885 in the DeLorean in an effort to save Doc Brown. After Doc Brown sets the date to September 2, 1885, Marty time travels and winds up in the middle of a battle between Native Americans and the U.S. Cavalry. A stray arrow rips the DeLorean's fuel line, making it impossible to run the car under its own power. Marty hides the time machine in a cave before heading to town to find Doc. Along the way, he meets his Irish great-great-grandparents, Seamus and Maggie, and their son, his great-grandfather. He discovers that Doc Brown has made a new life as a blacksmith. Marty crosses paths with "Mad Dog" Tannen, Biff's great-grandfather, and gets into a brawl with him. He is rescued by Doc Brown while being hanged from a noose by Tannen. The two concoct a plan to get the DeLorean up to 88 miles per hour to transport Marty back to 1985 and save Doc from being shot by Tannen. While they plan their escape, Marty and Doc Brown meet a teacher named Clara Clayton, and Doc Brown falls in love with her. During a festival, "Mad Dog" and Marty agree to a one-on-one showdown on the very day Marty is scheduled to travel back to 1985. Meanwhile, Marty learns from Seamus that his previously unknown great-great-granduncle, Martin, was killed after being goaded into a knife fight. Although Doc tries to shield the timeline by hiding Marty's future—specifically a devastating car collision with a Rolls-Royce provoked by Douglas J. Needles that ruins his and Jennifer's lives—he inadvertently lets slip that Marty is bound to repeat the tragic history of his namesake ancestor. During the showdown, Marty defeats "Mad Dog" and proceeds with their time travel plan, which involves pushing the DeLorean with a steam engine over a ravine. Finally, Doc Brown decides to stay in 1885 with Clara while Marty travels back to 1985 in the DeLorean. Upon arrival in 1985, the time machine is destroyed by an oncoming train, but Marty escapes. After reuniting with Jennifer, Marty ultimately declines Needles's challenge based on his experiences in 1885, completely unaware that he just avoided the fateful street race. This avoids the collision with the Rolls-Royce and erases the bleak McFly family future, preventing the accident Doc implied and leaving their actual fate wide open. While Marty and Jennifer ponder the wrecked DeLorean—seemingly trapped in the present with no way to rescue Doc or explore their newly altered future—Doc Brown spectacularly arrives in a new time machine crafted from a steam locomotive, accompanied by his wife Clara and their two sons. Doc hints at having already explored the couple's newly altered future, confirming he is aware of how Marty avoided his downward spiral. Before departing, he reminds them that the future is completely unwritten and urges them to make it a good one.

=== Video games ===
In 1985, a Back to the Future video game loosely based on the film was released on the Commodore 64, featuring Marty as a playable character. Released by Electric Dreams, the game involves Marty interacting with other characters from the film and finding objects, while his progress is tracked by a photo of himself and his siblings disappearing. Another Back to the Future video game was released by LJN in 1989 on the Nintendo Entertainment System and features Marty running around Hill Valley to pick up clocks and avoid obstacles and enemies. This was followed in 1990 by Back to the Future Part II & III, a side-scrolling platform game based on the second and third films, which was also released by LJN. A Back to the Future Part II video game was also published in 1990 by Image Works based on the film. A 1991 Back to the Future Part III video game was also released for 16-bit consoles, including the ZX Spectrum, Commodore 64 and Amiga. In 1993, a video game titled Super Back to the Future Part II was published by Toshiba and developed by Daft for the Nintendo Super Famicom, which featured Marty as a playable character riding his hoverboard. In 2010, Telltale Games published Back to the Future: The Game, an episodic video game. Set after the film trilogy, it features the voice of A.J. LoCascio as Marty, the player character. Fox reprised his role in the crossover toys-to-life Lego video game Lego Dimensions. Marty also appears alongside Doc Brown in the video game, Funko Fusion. In the inaugural season of the seventh chapter of the online battle royale game Fortnite, Marty appears as an unlockable skin in the season's Hollywood-themed battle pass.

=== Stage ===
In 2014, a West End musical adaptation of Back to the Future was announced. Both Zemeckis and Gale were involved in the production, with Jamie Lloyd as director and co-writer. The aim was to produce a stage show with the spirit of the film, but with some additional music and lyrics. It was due to launch in 2015, the 30th anniversary of the film, but was delayed when Jamie Lloyd left the project due to creative differences. Stage actor Olly Dobson debuted the role of Marty in Back to the Future: The Musical, which premiered at Manchester Opera House on 20 February 2020 and ran for 12 weeks before moving to the West End. In the London production at the Adelphi Theatre, he was succeeded by Ben Joyce. Casey Likes plays him in the Broadway production of the musical. For the North American tour that launched in June 2024 at Playhouse Square in Cleveland, Caden Brauch took on the role.

=== Theme parks ===
==== Universal Orlando Resort (1990s-2010s) (2026) ====
Marty McFly Is a seasonal character at Universal Studios Florida. He met more often when Back to the Future the ride (1991-2007) was in the park. After the rides closed he became a rare offering. Last seen at annual pass holder nights on August 15-16, 2026.

Doc and Marty

==== Mega Movie Parade - Universal Orlando Resort ( July 3rd 2024 - Current ) ====
Marty and Doc Mega Movie Parade 2025

Seasonal parade at universal that features Back to the Future, Sing, Minions, Kung fu panda, Trolls, Ghostbusters, Jaws, E.T., and Jurassic World. This was Marty's first appearance back in the park in over a decade.

Doc and Marty Mega Movie Parade 2025

==== Universal Studios Hollywood (2025- Current) ====
Marty was a part of Destination Hill Valley at Universal Fan Fest Nights 2025 and stayed around as a meet and greet character when the event ended.

=== Other media ===
David Kaufman voices Marty in Back to the Future: The Animated Series, which ran for two seasons from 1991 to 1993. It follows the adventures of Marty, Doc and his wife Clara as they travel through time. Fox appeared as Marty in a television promo for the 2010 Scream Awards. Fox and Lloyd made an entrance in the DeLorean as Marty and Doc Brown on Jimmy Kimmel Live! on October 21, 2015, the day the characters traveled to in Back to the Future Part II. In the scene, the two characters were shown to be unimpressed by technological progress in 2015. For the same date, on Back to the Future Day, CollegeHumor released a cartoon skit featuring Marty and Doc Brown, which showed how they would react to real life in 2015. In 2020, Fox dressed in Wild West clothing as Marty in a trailer to promote the Christmas song "Holiday" by Lil Nas X.

== Merchandise ==
=== Nike Mag ===
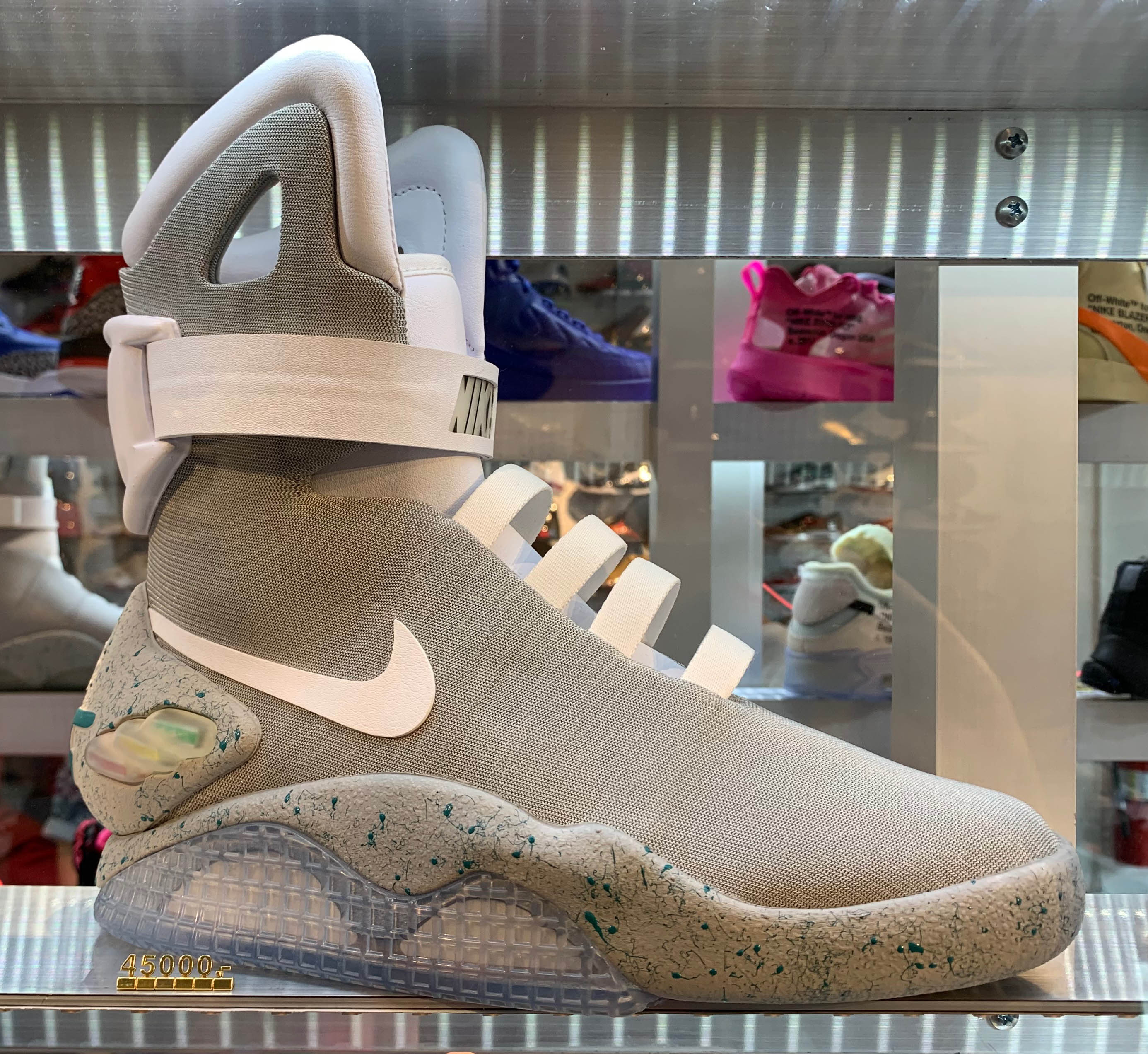
The Nike Mag was designed to be a replica of the film version worn by Marty in Back to the Future Part II.

Marty's futuristic light-up, self-tying shoes worn in Back to the Future Part II were designed by Tinker Hatfield, a shoe designer at Nike. The company subsequently filed a patent in 2008 for a working prototype of the film prop designed by Tiffany Beers. In 2011, Nike launched the first replica light-up Nike Mag shoe, which was exclusively sold at auction with proceeds to the Michael J. Fox Foundation. This shoe still lacked the self-lacing technology. The auction was highly anticipated but limited to 1500 pairs. On Oct 21, 2015, Fox appeared on Jimmy Kimmel Live! where he introduced the Nike Mag shoe with power laces to be auctioned in 2016. Nike produced 89 pairs that were made available in a raffle in October 2016, with proceeds donated to Fox's foundation.

=== Hoverboard ===
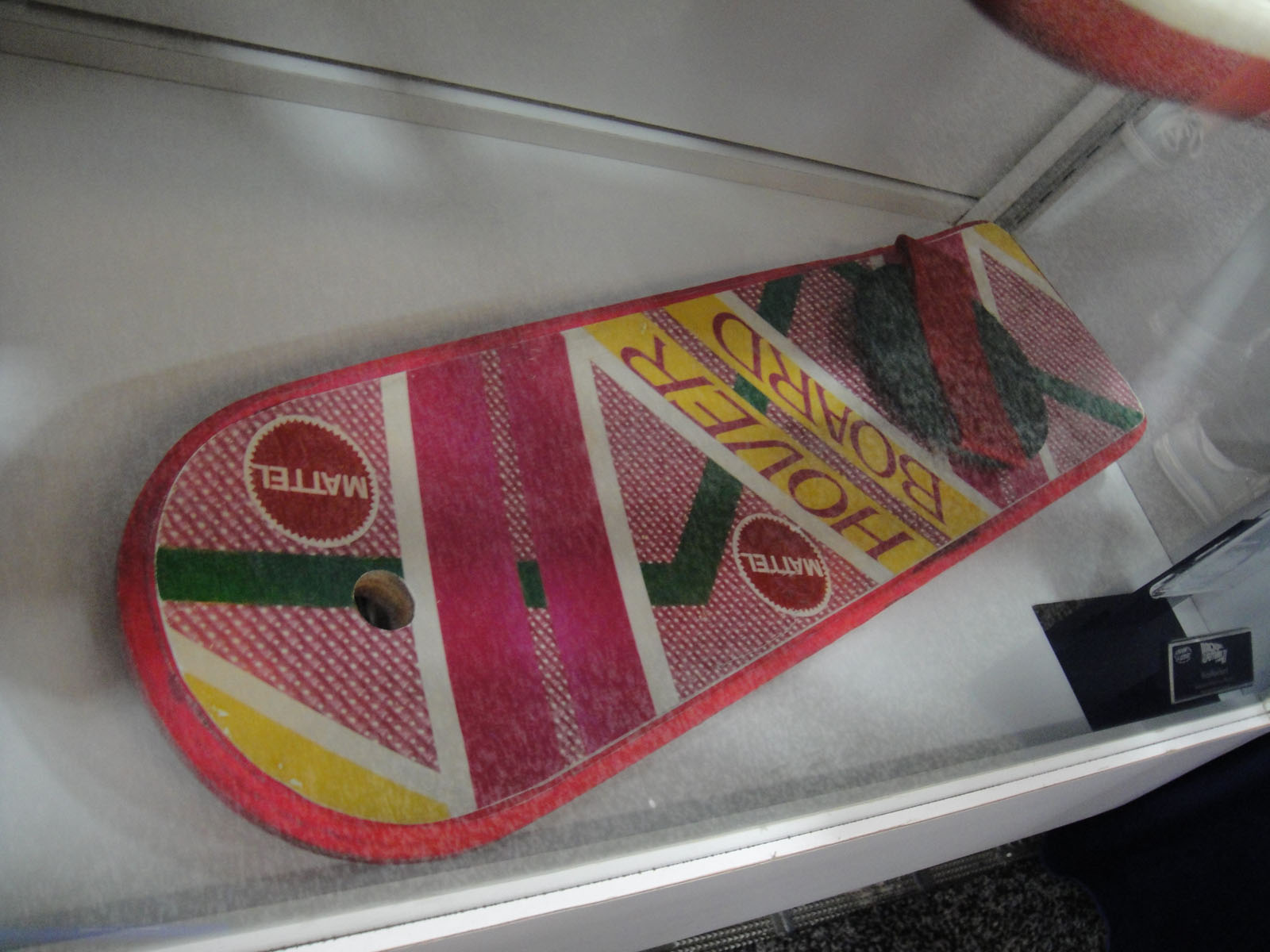
Marty's Mattel hoverboard displayed at the 2011 San Diego Comic-Con

After Marty appeared in Back to the Future Part II where he replaced his skateboard with a hoverboard, the invention of a real levitating board was in high demand. Rumors that a real hoverboard had been invented were fueled by Zemeckis in a 30-minute documentary presented by Leslie Nielsen that aired on NBC Friday Night At The Movies, which was designed to promote the film. Zemeckis stated that hoverboards were real, but parent groups had not allowed manufacturers to produce them, although some were found and used in the film. In Back to the Future Part II, Fox appeared using a pink Mattel-branded board that has the appearance of a skateboard but hovers a few inches above the ground. Various companies have since produced versions of the hoverboard using a variety of technologies. In 2012, Mattel released a replica of the hoverboard for children, although it did not have the ability to hover. In 2014, a viral online video involving Lloyd that promoted a working hoverboard was revealed to be a hoax created by Funny or Die.

== Reception ==
=== Critical response ===
Following the release of Back to the Future, Marty McFly received a largely positive response from critics. Vincent Canby of The New York Times appreciated the comedy in Marty's home life in 1985 and his adventures in 1955 and considered Fox's performance to be funny. Roger Ebert favorably compared Marty's story arc to Frank Capra's It's a Wonderful Life, stating that he "begins with one view of his life and reality, and is allowed, through magical intervention, to discover another". Kirk Ellis of The Hollywood Reporter made a similar comparison and described Fox's portrayal as "appealing" stating that he was "easily one of the more intelligent-looking young actors to cross a screen recently". Conversely, Los Angeles Times reviewer Sheila Benson left an unfavorable review, describing Marty as "big on brashness and energy, dangerously low on subtlety". Ray Loynd writing for Variety enjoyed the "zestful" performance of Fox, describing him as an "Arthurian knight figure" and his rendition of "Johnny B. Goode" as an "audience-grabbing scene". Richard Corliss of Time responded positively to Marty's heavy metal riff and predicted that viewers would continue to love him for the next 30 years.

=== Cultural impact and legacy ===
Back to the Future was a commercial success and the highest-grossing film at the box office in 1985. It spawned two sequels and transformed Fox into a box office star. Due to the success and popularity of the film trilogy, Marty McFly is widely considered to be Fox's most celebrated film role. In the decades following the release of Back to the Future, critics have reflected on the character's impact. Marty McFly was listed as one of the ten greatest sci-fi movie characters of all time by Olly Dyche of MovieWeb, who described him as "an incredibly cool character" with "enough charm to make anyone swoon". Eric Francisco of GamesRadar+ ranked him the seventh greatest movie character of the 1980s alongside Doc Brown. Empire magazine selected him as the 12th greatest movie character of all time. GQ chose Marty's 1985 clothing as one of the most iconic movie outfits, specifying the "double-denim, the flannel, the iconic red puffer vest". In a retrospective review, Justin Chang in the Los Angeles Times noted that Back to the Future is in essence Marty's story, specifically his struggle to control his existence, and considered every other character in the film an "afterthought". Kayla Turner of Screen Rant counted Marty as one of the film characters that defined the 1980s, describing him as a "timeless cultural icon whose influence extends far beyond the decade". Reflecting on the "Johnny B. Goode" scene in Back to the Future, Jason Lipshutz of Billboard described Marty as "one of the most beloved characters in film history". Emily Lackey writing for Bustle called him a "pop culture icon". Fox has also been praised for his portrayal of Marty. The Guardian writer Hadley Freeman attributed much of the timelessness of Back to the Future to his performance commenting, "His bright-eyed charm and, yes, screwball energy give the film a joyful momentum that makes it an enduring pleasure". Mark Monahan writing for The Telegraph opined that Back to the Future would be a poorer film without Fox's "uniquely energetic charm". In a review, Empire's Adam Smith opined that the film established Fox as "the finest light-comedy actor of his generation" and considered his portrayal of Marty as "the most charming screen presence of the 80s". Tom Breihan of The A. V. Club said that it was difficult to imagine anyone as perfect as Fox in the role of Marty and described him as "small and squinty and breezily charismatic".

Critics have paid tribute to a sequence in Back to the Future in which Marty takes to the stage at the high school dance, grabs a red Gibson ES-345 and leads a version of Chuck Berry's song "Johnny B. Goode" in front of a crowd of 1950s teenagers. In the film, his performance motivates the character Marvin Berry to call up his cousin and hold up the phone so that he can hear the new sound. Ben Travis of Empire described the scene as "Marty's coolest moment, channelling all of the actor's own rock star heroes". Gregory Wakeman of Yahoo! Entertainment considered it to be "arguably the most iconic sequence of the entire movie". MovieWeb called it "a staple of pop culture with innumerable movies and shows riffing on the scene's premise". The Hollywood Reporter cited it as the greatest moment in the film. David Browne writing for Rolling Stone highlighted that the scene could be viewed as problematic, as it implies that Marty, a white teenager, invented rock and roll and appropriates the music of Chuck Berry. The scene was reproduced in the stage adaptation but altered to remove the telephone conversation. According to Berry's son, Charles Berry Jr., this was not viewed as problematic by his father or himself and he recognized that it was just a movie. Billboard's Jason Lipshutz commented that the scene defined Back to the Future and epitomised its lead character: "Marty is a freight train, barging into high school gymnasiums and shootouts with terrorists and different dimensions with a hangdog charm and ease of knowing that he can skateboard past his problems." Complex listed the scene as one of the great moments in movie history.

Marty has been influential in popular culture and he has often been referenced in other media. Morty Smith of the American animated series Rick and Morty began as a parody of Marty McFly. He was the inspiration for the naming of the English band McFly. Tom Holland cited Marty as his main inspiration for Peter Parker in Spider-Man: Homecoming. He said, "My goal was to try and kind of be our generation's Marty McFly." Japanese pro wrestler Kushida has dressed as Marty McFly as part of his ring character. In 2018, The Great British Bake Off opened a series with a skit involving host Sandi Toksvig dressed as Marty alongside Noel Fielding dressed as Doc Brown. The Daily Dot reported in 2018 that Marty had become an internet meme, in particular a scene in which he plays heavy rock at the school dance in 1955 and the teenagers fail to appreciate his music. The meme was used to express something considered too far ahead of its time, quoting Marty's response "Guess you're not ready for that yet, but your kids are gonna love it". In October 2021, Daniel Craig reenacted a Back to the Future scene in the role of Marty with James Corden and Christopher Lloyd on The Late Late Show. Season 3 of Stranger Things includes numerous references to Back to the Future, including visual homages to the character. In the 2023 film The Flash, Marty is referenced as a joke when Barry Allen travels back in time to stop his mother from being murdered and changes history in the process. He is horrified to discover that Marty is portrayed by Stoltz in Back to the Future instead of Fox. When Fox joined British band Coldplay on stage at Glastonbury in 2024, Chris Martin explained, "The main reason why we're in a band is because of watching Back to the Future".

=== Awards and honours ===
For his portrayal of Marty McFly, Fox received several awards and nominations. In 1985, he was nominated for a Golden Globe Award for Best Actor in a Motion Picture – Musical or Comedy for Back to the Future. He also won a Saturn Award for Best Actor in 1985 for the film. In 1986, he won a Jupiter Award for Best International Actor for the role.
