= Nike Mag =

Limited-edition shoe created by Nike

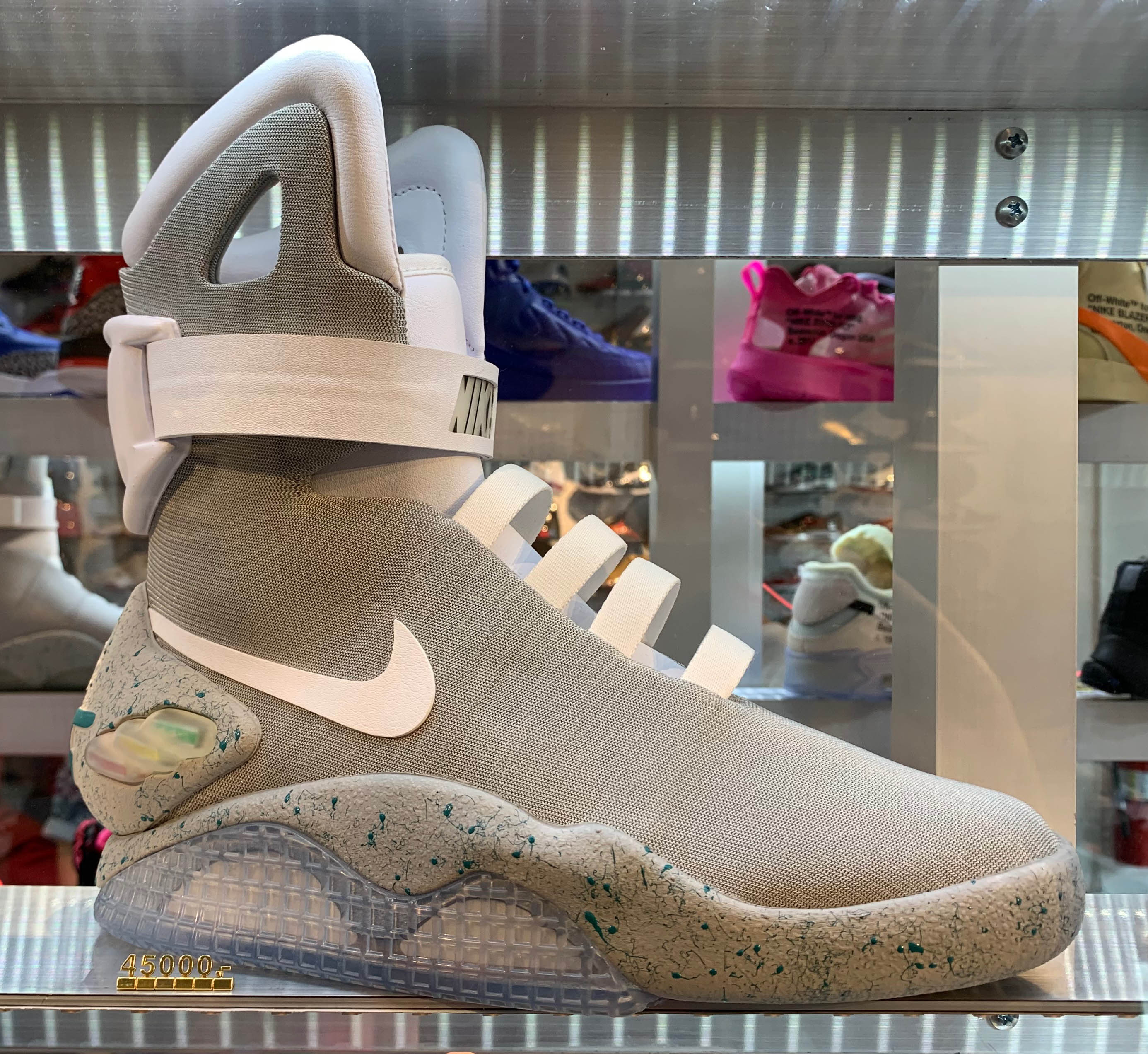
- Type: Shoe
- Inventor: Nike, Inc.
- Inception: 2011; 15 years ago
- Manufacturer: Nike

The Nike MAG is a shoe created by Nike Inc. It is a replica of a self-tying shoe featured in the film Back to the Future Part II. The Nike Mag was originally released for sale in 2011 and again in 2016. Both launches were in limited quantities. The 2011 release was limited to 1,510 pairs, while the 2016 release was limited to 89 pairs.

Nike has stated Mag is not meant for heavy activity and should not be worn for recreational purposes. They were produced mostly for display.

== Background ==
Back to the Future, the first in a trilogy of films, was a box office success. In 1989, Nike Inc. designer Tinker Hatfield was asked to create a shoe for the second installment of the series, which was partly set in the then-futuristic year of 2015. The shoe had features that included light-up panels and self-fastening laces.

== Redesign ==
Over 15 years later, an online petition that asked for the return of the shoes caught the attention of Tinker Hatfield. He and footwear innovator Tiffany Beers (designer of the Nike Kyrie sneaker line) worked on the redesign for approximately six years and had to restart about three times. After thousands of hours of work, the shoes were a replica of the 1989 Nike MAG worn by Marty McFly. The shoes feature an electroluminescent outsole, space-age materials, and a rechargeable internal battery good for 3,000 hours. They are the first rechargeable pair of footwear made by Nike. Power laces, a prominent feature of the shoe in the film, are not present. However, Nike released a statement stating that they "took inspiration from the film" to make the shoe.

== 2011 release ==
A limited quantity of 1,500 pairs was auctioned on eBay on September 8, 2011, and all proceeds were being dedicated to The Michael J. Fox Foundation for Parkinson's disease research. Online sales of the shoe ranged between US$10,600 and US$15,900 (latest Stock X sales from 2021). Ten additional pairs, packaged in presentation boxes, were sold exclusively by Nike at live auctions around the world, for a total of 1,510 pairs.

A total of US$4.7 million was raised from the online auctions. Sergey Brin, co-founder of Google, and his wife Anne Wojcicki agreed to match all donations of the Michael J. Fox Foundation, up to US$5 million up to the end of 2011. This brought the total proceeds from the online auctions to US$9.4 million.

== 2016 release ==
While Tinker Hatfield was working with Nike, according to his research, basketball athletes were hurting their feet by lacing their shoes too tight in their games on and off the court. He wondered if there was a way to eliminate that, make a shoe that would lace automatically to adjust to your foot specifically. That is when he started working on a self-lacing technology that was later on named, E.A.R.L. (Electro Adaptive Reactive Lacing). When the technology was developed, they were originally going to release it first on a basketball shoe. However, Tinker Hatfield ended up putting it in the Nike Mag to fulfill the public's wish. Then on October 21, 2015, which is the same date Marty McFly visited the future in Back to the Future Part II, Nike unveiled a self-lacing version of the Nike Mag which was scheduled to go on sale March 20, 2016. The release was delayed to October 4, 2016. Michael J. Fox was the first to get Nike shoes in October 2015. On October 4, 2016, Nike opened a raffle for the Nike Mag through the RallyUp fundraising platform, where anyone could purchase a ticket for $10 (unlimited entries), but the raffle was limited to 89 pairs. All proceeds would be donated to Parkinson's research. Nike raised an additional $6.75 million for the Michael J. Fox Foundation for Parkinson's Research.
