= Tinker Hatfield =

American shoe designer (born 1952)

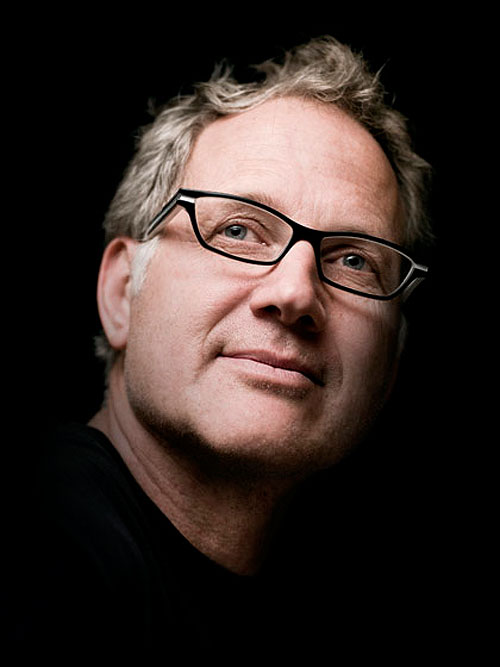
- Born: Tinker Linn Hatfield Jr. April 30, 1952 (age 74); Hillsboro, Oregon, U.S.
- Education: University of Oregon (B.Arch., 1977)
- Alma mater: University of Oregon
- Occupations: designer; architectural designer
- Known for: Air Jordan, Air Max
- Spouse: Jackie Hatfield
- Children: 3 daughters
- Parent: Tinker Haven Hatfield Sr.

Tinker Linn Hatfield Jr. (born April 30, 1952) is an American designer of numerous Nike athletic shoe models, including the Air Jordan III through Air Jordan XV, the twentieth-anniversary Air Jordan XX, the Air Jordan XXIII, the 2010 (XXV), the 2015 Air Jordan XX9 (XXIX), and other athletic sneakers including the world's first "cross training" shoes, the Nike Air Trainer. Hatfield is Nike's Vice President for Design and Special Projects and oversees Nike's "Innovation Kitchen". For his many innovative designs and numerous creations over more than three decades, Hatfield is considered a legend of design.

== Early life ==
Hatfield was born on April 30, 1952, in Hillsboro, Oregon. He attended Central Linn High School, where he was an exceptionally talented basketball player, an All-State football running back, and an All-American track-and-field star in hurdle events and pole vaulting. In 1970, he was recognized as the top high school athlete in the state of Oregon.

At the University of Oregon, Hatfield studied architecture and continued his track and field career under the coaching of Bill Bowerman, co-founder of Nike. He set the university record in the pole vault and placed sixth in that event at the 1976 Olympic trials. However, his athletic career was cut short by an injury during his second year at the university. He finished his college studies in the fall of 1976 and was awarded a bachelor's degree in architecture from the university in 1977.

After graduating from college, Hatfield practiced as an architect in Eugene until he joined Nike in 1981.

== Nike ==
Hatfield joined Nike in 1981, and in 1985 started working on shoe design. He realized that his architectural skills could be applied to shoes. Hatfield was also published for the architectural design of his Portland, Oregon home. He claims to have designed the cross-trainer as a "multi-sport" shoe when he realized people at his Oregon gym brought various sneakers with them for diverse activities such as basketball, aerobics, weightlifting and jogging. In 1987, Tinker Hatfield designed the Air Max 1 Running Shoe after visiting the Centre Georges Pompidou; and in 1990 released the third in the Air Max line, the Air Max 90 (Air Max III at the time). Hatfield designed the bat-boots for Michael Keaton to wear in Batman and Batman Returns. Hatfield's younger brother, Tobie Hatfield, joined Nike in 1990 as a senior engineer.

He also created the graphic design on the basketball court at the Matthew Knight Arena at the University of Oregon; the facility opened in 2011. In 2013, Hatfield worked on both Nike and Jordan brand concept car designs for Gran Turismo 6. In 2014, Hatfield indicated that Nike would unveil a shoe with power-lacing technology, as worn by Marty McFly in the 1989 film Back to the Future Part II, which partially takes place in the year 2015. Hatfield was profiled in the first season of the Netflix documentary series Abstract: The Art of Design. In 2019, Hatfield received his own sneaker, titled the Nike React "Tinker Hatfield". The shoes were first presented to the public by him at SXSW.

== Air Jordans ==
Hatfield was the lead designer of Air Jordans III through XV, XX, and XX3. Additionally, Hatfield co-designed Air Jordans 2010 and XXX.

Phil Knight credits the Air Jordan III with saving Nike, claiming it kept Michael Jordan from leaving the company for Adidas.

According to a 2018 interview with Hatfield, his favorite Air Jordan model is the Air Jordan 11 and his least favorite is the Air Jordan 15.

== Honors and awards ==
- One of Sportstyle Magazine's most influential people on the business side of sports, 1993 and 1996
- One of Fortune magazine's "100 Most Influential Designers" of the 20th century, 1998
- Ellis F. Lawrence Medal, University of Oregon School of Architecture and Allied Arts, 2008
- Oregon Sports Hall of Fame, Special Contribution to Sport, 2008
