= Lisa Freeman =

American author and actress

- Occupations: Writer, actress
- Years active: 1980–present
- Father: Leonard Freeman

Lisa Freeman is an American author and actress best known for her young adult surf fiction novel Honey Girl. After attending Columbia Pictures Acting School in 1978, Freeman made her acting debut on an episode of Knots Landing. Her film credits include Friday the 13th: The Final Chapter and Back to the Future. After more than a decade in front of the camera, Freeman left acting to pursue a writing career.

== Early life ==
Lisa Freeman's father Leonard Freeman created and produced the iconic TV series, Hawaii Five-O.

She was a student of Mary Carver. In 1978, Freeman was part of a Colombia Pictures Acting School.

== Career ==
Freeman performed at The Comedy Store in West Hollywood and appeared regularly on the Rick Dees in the Morning radio show.

In 1980, Freeman made her acting and TV debut on an episode of Knots Landing. Freeman landed her first TV role in the series In Trouble, co-starring with Nancy Cartwright and Deena Freeman (no relation). Freeman's most notable film credits include Mr. Mom, Friday the 13th: The Final Chapter, Back to the Future and Back to the Future Part II.

Freeman was also part of the L.A. underground spoken word scene and was produced by Harvey Kubernick. Her albums include Hollyword, Neighborhood Rhythms, and her solo effort, Rough Road, all produced on New Alliance Records.

After more than a decade in front of the camera, Freeman left acting to pursue academia and a writing career. She began working with Kate Braverman in 1990 at the L.A. Writers Workshop, which soon led to academic studies at Antioch University, where she earned her BA and MFA in Fiction and Pedagogy in the Art of Writing.

In 2015, Freeman was serving on the National Leadership Council's board of directors for the Native Arts and Cultures Foundation.

== Filmography ==
Films
Year	Title	Role	Notes
1983	Mr. Mom	Motorhead	
1984	Friday the 13th: The Final Chapter	Nurse Robbi Morgan	
1984	Breakin'	Waitress	
1984	Savage Streets	Francine Anne Ramirez	
1985	Back to the Future	Babs	
1989	Back to the Future Part II	Babs	

Television
Year	Title	Role	Notes
1980	Knots Landing	Sue Shaw	Episode: "Small Surprises"
1980	To Race the Wind	Pat	Television film
1981	In Trouble	Ivy Miller	Television pilot
1981	Quincy, M.E.	Girl	Episode: "Memories of Allison"
1981	Archie Bunker's Place	Punker	Episode: "Happy Birthday, Stephanie"
1983	Reggie	Debra	Episode: "Mark's Girlfriend"
1984	Double Trouble	Marilyn	Episode: "Heartache"
1984	The Facts of Life	Sally	Episode: "A Slice of Life"
1990	Doogie Howser, M.D.	30's Her	Episode: "Breaking Up Is Hard to Doogie"
1995	Bringing up Jack	Nurse Gwen	Episode: "The Beeper"

== Publications ==
Year	Title	Publication	Notes
1998	Survivor	Rain City Review/Literary Journal	
1998	Van Gogh's Last Tiptoe	Rain City Review/Literary Journal	
2005	Doing It	Suspect Thoughts	
2015	Honey Girl	Sky Pony Press	
2017	Riptide Summer	Sky Pony Press	

== Spoken word ==
Year	Title	Company	Notes
1985	Voices of the Angels	New Alliance Recordings	
1987	Neighborhood Rhythms	New Alliance Recordings	
1988	Hollyword	New Alliance Recordings	
1991	Disclosure	New Alliance Recordings	
1994	Rough Roads	Executive Production BarkubCo Music, Inc	

== Illustrations ==
Year	Title	Author	Notes
2000	Letters for Tomorrow	Robin Freeman Bernstein, M.A., and Cathy Moore, Ph.D.	
2005	I Know I Can Climb the Mountain	Dale S. Brown	
