= Nike HyperAdapt 1.0 =

First self-lacing shoe for retail

Nike Hyperadapt 1.0
- Industry: Footwear
- Founded: 2017
- Brands: Nike
- Website: nike.com

The Nike HyperAdapt 1.0 is a self-lacing shoe. It was designed by Tinker Hatfield accompanied by Mark Parker, who was heavily involved in the development. Utilizing an electro adaptive lacing system abbreviated as "E.A.R.L.", the sneaker conforms to the figuration of the wearer's foot. On December 1, 2016, they were released in limited quantity for $720. Due to the shoes being released in limited quantity at the time, pairs were sold on the secondary market at upwards of $200,000. The Hyperadapt has been re-released several times since the initial release date in extremely small quantities.
