= List of Back to the Future (franchise) characters =

Franchise logo

The Back to the Future franchise, including film trilogy and subsequent animated series feature characters created by Robert Zemeckis and Bob Gale.

The lead character of the series is Marty McFly. During the course of the trilogy, he travels through time using a DeLorean time machine invented by his friend Emmett Brown. He also encounters the central antagonist, Biff Tannen, in several different time periods and visits his ancestors and descendants.

== Main characters ==
=== Marty McFly ===
Martin Seamus ("Marty") McFly (portrayed by Michael J. Fox in the films and voiced by him in Lego Dimensions, voiced by David Kaufman in the animated series and by A. J. LoCascio in Back to the Future: The Game) is the main protagonist of the trilogy. He is the son of George and Lorraine McFly and the youngest of 3 children. Marty travels between the past and the future, encountering his ancestors and descendants. Marty and his friend Doc Brown help restore the space-time continuum while encountering Biff Tannen (or members of the Tannen clan) at various points in time.

=== Emmett "Doc" Brown ===
Doctor Emmett Lathrop ("Doc") Brown (portrayed by Christopher Lloyd and voiced by him in Lego Dimensions, voiced by Dan Castellaneta in the animated series) is the eccentric inventor of the DeLorean time machine. At various points in time, Doc helps Marty restore the space-time continuum and reverse the changes that were caused by time travel. During the 50's, he was shown to be a failure of a scientist but between then and 1985 became successful and discovered time travel.

In 2008, the character was selected by film magazine Empire as one of The 100 Greatest Movie Characters of All Time, ranking at No. 20.

=== George McFly ===
George Douglas McFly (portrayed by Crispin Glover in Back to the Future, Jeffrey Weissman in Back to the Future Part II and Back to the Future Part III, voiced by Michael X. Sommers in Back to the Future: The Game) is married to Lorraine McFly (née Baines) and is the father of Marty, Linda, and Dave. Although he is one of the main characters in the first movie, George only makes cameos in Back to the Future Part II and Back to the Future Part III.

In the first film, George is portrayed as a weakling with low self-esteem and the main target of Biff Tannen's bullying. The novelization expands on George's history of weakness, describing two incidents in which he cannot stand up for himself. In 1955, in contrast to Marty, George did not have any friends for support and was targeted not only by Biff and his gang but also by other kids in school. He has a penchant for science fiction and writes some of his own, but he never shares them with anyone for fear of rejection. In 1955, Marty suggested George play the hero and save Lorraine at the dance while Marty pretends to be antagonistic towards her. Instead, he catches Biff trying to assault her. Overcoming his fear, his morals compel him to stand his ground. Upon seeing Biff physically shove Lorraine to the ground after she tries to get Biff off George, he gets the courage to stand up to Biff, knocking him unconscious. As a result, he and Lorraine fall in love, and George becomes popular in school for defeating Biff in a fight. During the dance, someone decided to steal Lorraine away in the middle of the song, so George showed that same courage in reclaiming his date, resulting in the kiss he and Lorraine shared. In the new future, George and Lorraine are married; George is a successful writer and professor, and Biff works a menial door-to-door car-waxing job. Their brief dialogue highlights that George and Biff have been enemies ever since that night—and that Biff always loses because George knows his tactics inside out. In the dystopian timeline in Part II, Biff murdered George in 1973 on his way to receive an award and then staged the death as a mugging.

Glover didn't like the sequel's script, and when he demanded more money than the producers were willing to pay him, the role was recast with Jeffrey Weissman. Weissman wore prosthetics to resemble Glover and imitated Glover's rendering of McFly, and his scenes were spliced with shots of Glover from Back to the Future. The result was so convincing that many people were fooled by it. However, Glover did not appreciate this and sued. While the lawsuit was settled before a legal precedent could be set, it did result in the adoption of stricter rules by the Screen Actors Guild to help prevent similar situations from occurring again. According to Hollywood Reporter, Glover had initially asked for $1 million, and the settlement sum amounted to $760,000.

=== Lorraine Baines/McFly ===
Lorraine McFly, née Baines (portrayed by Lea Thompson, voiced by Aimee Miles in Back to the Future: The Game), is married to George McFly and the mother of Marty, Linda and Dave. She is the oldest child of Sam (George DiCenzo) and Stella (Frances Lee McCain) Baines, and older sister of Milton (Jason Hervey), Sally (Maia Brewton), Toby, and Joey.

In Back to the Future, Lorraine is initially portrayed in 1985 as middle-aged, out of shape, and unhappy with a drinking problem. In 1955, she became infatuated with Marty, who was accidentally hit by her father's car; this was in part due to Marty saving George, almost altering the timeline. After Marty changes the timeline and helps George gain his confidence and self-esteem, she is shown to be fit and happily married to George in 1985. In Part II, Lorraine is still happily married to George in 2015, but they are constantly disappointed in Marty for giving in to peer pressure that makes his life difficult. In the alternate 1985 timeline, she is widowed and forced into a marriage to Biff Tannen, whom she eventually kills after discovering that he was the one who murdered her first husband.

=== Clara Clayton ===
Clara Clayton (portrayed by Mary Steenburgen in both Back to the Future Part III and the animated series) is married to Doc Brown and is the mother of Jules and Verne Brown.

Clara moved to Hill Valley and originally died in an accident when her wagon plummeted into Shonash Ravine, which was renamed Clayton Ravine in her memory. This first changed when Doc volunteered to pick Clara up at the Hill Valley Railroad Station, unknowingly saving her from the tragic wagon accident. After they started falling in love, Buford Tannen murdered Doc, and Clara erected a tombstone for him. Because of this tragedy, Clara inadvertently sent a distress call to the future, prompting Marty McFly to travel back to 1885 to rescue his friend. Second, despite Doc's best efforts to avoid Clara and protect history, Marty's arrival set off a chain of events that forced Doc to save her from the ravine anyway. With Clara's death averted, Mayor Hubert renamed the gorge Eastwood Ravine, believing that Marty's alias, Clint Eastwood, had perished in the locomotive crash. According to the town's lore, Eastwood died heroically after defeating Buford Tannen and then pursuing two bandits who hijacked the engine. The animated series reveals that Clara, along with the rest of the family, moves to the early 1990s and lives in a farmhouse outside of Hill Valley. She then became a teacher at Hill Valley Elementary School.

=== Jennifer Parker ===
Jennifer Jane Parker (portrayed by Claudia Wells in the first film and voiced by her in Back to the Future: The Game, Elisabeth Shue in the second film and third film, voiced by Cathy Cavadini in the animated series) is dating Marty McFly. By 2015, as seen in Back to the Future Part II, they are married with two children.

In 1985, Jennifer attends Hill Valley High School, along with her boyfriend Marty. In the animated series, Jennifer is enrolled to Hill Valley College with Marty after graduating high school and working part-time as a tutor. She lives with her family on a ranch, the deed to which was owned by Biff Tannen, after one of his ancestors forced Jennifer's great-great-grandfather to sign it over by holding Jennifer's great-great-grandmother hostage. In the episode "A Friend in Deed", Marty travels back in time to 1875 and sabotages the deal with help from Jules and Verne.

In the future witnessed in Back to the Future Part II, Jennifer and Marty had two children, Marlene and Marty Jr. (both played by Michael J. Fox).

Melora Hardin was initially cast in the role, to appear alongside Eric Stoltz's Marty McFly. After Stoltz was fired from the production and Michael J. Fox was brought in, Claudia Wells was cast to portray the character, as Hardin was deemed too tall to appear next to the much shorter Fox. However, Wells was not available to film the sequels for personal reasons, and the role was recast to Elisabeth Shue although Wells reprised her role as Jennifer in Back to the Future: The Game as a punk rock version of her character. Consequently, the opening scene of Back to the Future Part II was re-shot with Shue taking Wells' place, rather than using the ending of Back to the Future.

=== Biff Tannen ===
Biff Howard Tannen (portrayed by Thomas F. Wilson, voiced by Kid Beyond in Back to the Future: The Game) is the main antagonist of the first two films, and a local bully who harassed George McFly and managed to alter history in the second film. He comes from a long line of bullies in Hill Valley, most of whom harassed members of the McFly family, including Buford "Mad Dog" Tannen (also portrayed by Wilson, in Part III), who is one of Hill Valley's outlaws during the 1880s.

== McFly family ==
=== Dave McFly ===
David "Dave" McFly (portrayed by Marc McClure) is the eldest child of George and Lorraine McFly. In 1985, before Marty went to 1955, Dave works at Burger King, but in the post-time travel 1985, he wears a suit as a nondescript white-collar worker for an accounting firm. In a deleted scene from Part II, the alternate 1985 timeline shows that Dave is an alcoholic and a gambling addict following George's death and Lorraine's second marriage to Biff Tannen.

=== Linda McFly ===
Linda McFly (portrayed by Wendie Jo Sperber) is the middle child and only daughter of George and Lorraine McFly. In 1985 before Marty went to 1955, Linda is having boy trouble and it is unknown if she is in college or has a job. In 1985 after Marty went to 1955, Linda works in a boutique and has gained the attention of many boys.

=== Seamus and Maggie McFly ===
Seamus and Maggie McFly (portrayed by Michael J. Fox and Lea Thompson) are Irish immigrants and Marty McFly's paternal great-great-grandparents. In Part III, Marty befriends Seamus and Maggie. While Maggie distrusts the "strange young man", Seamus has a familiar feeling about him and believes that helping him is the right thing to do. They have a son named William (Marty's great-grandfather). Much like his descendants, Seamus is harassed by a member of the Tannen family, Buford Tannen; however, unlike his descendants, he didn't take any notice of Tannen. Seamus's brother, Martin, had been fatally stabbed before the film’s events after being egged into a fight. Recognizing the same dangerous pride in Marty, Seamus steps in as a mentor to help him mature before his short temper gets him killed.

Due to Lea Thompson playing both roles, Maggie bears resemblance to Lorraine, despite her being an ancestor of George; in a DVD commentary track for Part III, Bob Gale stated that the creative team considered it important to include Thompson in the film, and explained that McFly men were simply "genetically predisposed" to be attracted to women who resemble Maggie.

=== William McFly ===
William "Willie" McFly (portrayed by Lindsay Vail Clark, voiced by Michael J. Fox in Back to the Future: The Game) is the son of Seamus and Maggie McFly as well as Marty's great-grandfather.

=== Arthur McFly and Sylvia Miskin ===
Arthur "Artie" McFly and Sylvia Miskin (stage name "Trixie Trotter") are Marty's paternal grandparents and George's parents introduced in Back to the Future: The Game and voiced by Michael X. Sommers and Melissa Hutchison respectively.

=== Marty Jr. and Marlene McFly ===
Marty Jr. and Marlene McFly (both portrayed by Michael J. Fox) are Marty McFly and Jennifer Parker's future children in 2015 in Part II.

Originally, 17-year-old Marty Jr. was to be arrested and sentenced to fifteen years in prison for joining a robbery initiated by Griff and his gang. Marlene attempted to help Marty Jr. break out of jail but failed and was sentenced to twenty years in a woman's prison. Doc and Marty prevented the event from ever happening.

== Baines family ==
=== Sam Baines ===
Sam Baines (portrayed by George DiCenzo) is the husband of Stella Baines and the father of six children, including Lorraine, Milton, Toby, Joey, Sally, and Ellen Baines. He is the father-in-law of George McFly and the maternal grandfather of Marty, David, and Linda McFly.

=== Stella Baines ===
Stella Baines (portrayed by Frances Lee McCain) is the wife of Sam Baines and the mother of six children, including Lorraine, Milton, Toby, Joey, Sally, and Ellen Baines. She is the mother-in-law of George McFly and the maternal grandmother of Marty, David, and Linda McFly.

=== Milton Baines ===
Milton Samuel Baines (portrayed by Jason Hervey) is the second child and oldest son of Sam and Stella Baines, the brother of Lorraine, Sally, Toby, Joey, and Ellen Baines, the brother-in-law of George McFly, and the uncle of David, Linda, and Marty McFly. He was 12 years old in 1955. In 1955, Milton liked to wear a coonskin cap, a fad inspired by the Davy Crockett film and television show, which Stella took off his head twice while Marty was eating dinner with the family, putting it back on both times.

=== Sally Baines ===
Sally Flora Baines (portrayed by Maia Brewton) is the third child and middle daughter of Sam and Stella Baines, the sister of Lorraine, Milton, Toby, Joey, and Ellen Baines, the sister-in-law of George McFly, and the aunt of David, Linda, and Marty McFly. Born in 1949, she was present when Marty McFly in 1955 had dinner with her family, but did not speak.

=== Toby Baines ===
Toby Baines is the fourth child and middle son of Sam and Stella Baines, the brother of Lorraine, Milton, Sally, Joey, and Ellen Baines, the brother-in-law of George McFly, and the uncle of David, Linda, and Marty McFly. He was born in 1951. On November 5, 1955, he sat at the dinner table with his family and Marty McFly, whom his father had hit with the car earlier that day. He remained silent while the guest was present.

=== Joey Baines ===
Joey Baines was born on August 28, 1954, to Sam and Stella Baines, and is the fifth child and youngest son in the Baines family. In 1955 his mother remarks, that he loves to be in his playpen, forshadowing his later life. In the early 1970s, Joey was Marty McFly's favorite uncle. Joey would allow Marty to do dangerous things, but would always be there to make sure he was all right. He spent many years in Folsom Prison. On October 25, 1985, he failed to earn his release on parole for at least the second time.

By the 21st century, USA Today ran an article on Joey Baines in their October 22, 2015 issue, titled Parole denied again, which mentioned that this was Joey's twelfth consecutive parole hearing to end in denial. He was serving a twenty-year term at Folsom for racketeering and had spent two-thirds of his life behind bars.

=== Ellen Baines ===
Ellen Baines is the youngest child of Sam and Stella Baines, the younger sister of Lorraine, Milton, Sally Toby, and Joey Baines, the sister-in-law of George McFly, and the aunt of David, Linda, and Marty McFly. Born in 1956 (a few months after Marty's trip to 1955), she moved to Chicago at some point prior to 1986.

== Brown family ==
=== Jules and Verne Brown ===
Jules Eratosthenes Brown and Verne Newton Brown (portrayed by Todd Cameron Brown and Dannel Evans in Back to the Future Part III, voiced by Josh Keaton and Troy Davidson in the animated series) are the two sons of Doc Brown and his wife, Clara, who named them after their favorite author Jules Verne.

The characters had minor, non-speaking roles in Back to the Future Part III but were further developed in the animated series. Jules, an introvert, mostly imitates his father's interests and mannerisms while Verne appears to be more outgoing and extroverted. Several plot points of the animated series revolve around either Jules or Verne altering history and the steps necessary to correct the damage.

In the Back to the Future game when asked about his family, Doc reveals that his sons are now teenagers and their parents are discussing what time period they should attend college at.

=== Copernicus ===
Copernicus is Doc's dog from 1955. Like his other dogs, Copernicus was used in many of Doc's experiments. When Copernicus died, he was eventually replaced by Einstein.

=== Einstein ===
Einstein (portrayed by Tiger and stuntman Dick Butler in the first film and Freddie in the other two, voiced by Danny Mann in the animated series) is Doc Brown's pet Catalan sheepdog. He later becomes one of the main characters in the animated series as the Brown family's dog.

In the first film, Doc successfully tests his time machine by placing Einstein in it and sending him one minute into the future. In the animated series, Einstein becomes anthropomorphic and smarter, helping Doc with his inventions for traveling to the past and the future.

== Tannen family ==
=== Buford "Mad Dog" Tannen ===
Buford Tannen (portrayed by Thomas F. Wilson in Back to the Future Part III, Liam O'Brien in Lego Dimensions) is the main antagonist of the third film. He is the great-grandfather of Biff Tannen and the local town outlaw in 1885 Hill Valley. He was nicknamed "Mad Dog" by a newspaper reporter, due to his violent temper and propensity for drooling, a nickname Tannen greatly despises. Buford is cruel, murderous, rude, and emotionally unstable. He displays a need for control and is brought down to childlike tantrums when he is humiliated or makes mistakes, whether it be something that happens to him or something he says or does. He is often accompanied by his gang (played by Christopher Wynne, Sean Sullivan and Mike Watson), and developed a feud with Marshal James Strickland and his deputies. Like his descendant Biff, he has a dislike for manure.

=== Irving "Kid" Tannen ===
"Kid" Tannen (voiced by Owen Thomas) is Biff's father who only appears in the Back to the Future: The Game. In the 1930s Hill Valley, he is a gangster who runs a local speakeasy. Like the rest of the Tannen family, Kid bullies the McFly family forcing Marty's grandfather Arthur to do his accounting. Kid is brought down with the help of Marty, a young version of Doc, and Arthur McFly. He later marries Edna Strickland and reforms from his criminal ways with her help.

=== Griff Tannen ===
Griff Tannen (portrayed by Thomas F. Wilson in both Back to the Future Part II and in the animated series) is the only known grandson of Biff. He is part of a gang that also consists of Rafe "Data" Unger, Leslie "Spike" O'Malley and Chester "Whitey" Noguera.

In the animated series, Griff makes a brief cameo appearance in the episode "Solar Sailors" where his grandson, Ziff (also voiced by Wilson), is detained after he attempts to sabotage Marta McFly's space cruiser due to his hatred towards her family.

Griff's last name is never mentioned in the movie, which means he could either be the son of Biff's son Biff Jr, or the son of Biff's daughter, Tiff, but in the animated series, Ziff says that both he and Griff are Tannens.

=== Biff Tannen Jr. ===
In the animated series, Biff Jr. (voiced by Benji Gregory) is the son of Biff Tannen. Like his father and paternal relatives, he likes to bully and steal from children around him including Jules and Verne Brown with whom he developed a feud. In addition, Biff Jr. delights in vandalizing other people's properties. Biff Jr. lives with his father with whom he has an abusive relationship.

== Strickland family ==
=== Stanford S. Strickland ===
Stanford S. Strickland (portrayed by James Tolkan), also known as Gerald Strickland, is the strict principal of Hill Valley High School. He is the grandson of Chief Marshal James Strickland of 1885's Hill Valley. He frequently makes a great noisy show of sternly reprimanding his students for faults such as "slacking" or liquor consumption, although he himself is revealed to sneak a drink of alcohol at his desk at school.

Strickland's office door in Part II identifies him as "S.S. Strickland", and the book Back to the Future: The Ultimate Visual History identifies his full name as "Stanford S. Strickland". However, the first episode of Back to the Future: The Game states that his first name is Gerald. Strickland's first name is also Gerald in George Gipe's novelization of Back to the Future.

=== James Strickland ===
James Strickland (portrayed by James Tolkan in Back to the Future Part III) is the chief marshal of Hill Valley in 1885 and an ancestor of Stanford S. Strickland. He also has an unnamed son (portrayed by Kaleb Henley).

In a deleted scene not included in the final cut, and in the movie's novelization, Strickland is killed by Buford Tannen. In the theatrical release Strickland simply remains absent for the latter half.

In the Back to the Future game, Edna Strickland in 1986 notes that James was shot and killed by Buford. Marty remarks that's a detail he doesn't remember, possibly a reference to the differences between the film and the movie novelization.

=== Edna Strickland ===
Edna Strickland (voiced by Rebecca Sweitzer) is introduced in Back to the Future: The Game. She is the sister of Stanford S. Strickland and the granddaughter of Marshall James Strickland. She is somewhat nicer than her brother, but still set in her ways towards upholding strong morals and abolishing crime and laziness. In 1931, she was a reporter and columnist for the Hill Valley Telegraph and a local campaigner for the continuation of Prohibition, although by 1986 she is retired and reclusive.

In one alternate timeline, she and Doc's younger self Emmett started dating and eventually married. Encouraging him to pursue a legal career, Edna turned Hill Valley into a technologically advance, authoritarian gated community. After attempting to use the "Citizen Plus" rehabilitation program to brainwash the town into absolute conformity, Citizen Brown (that timeline's version of Doc and the nominal leader of Hill Valley) decides to go back to 1931 with Marty to prevent his and Edna's relationship. Unintentionally arriving several months late due to damage sustained by the DeLorean, Marty successfully breaks up Emmett and Edna during the inaugural Hill Valley Expo; instead of a flying car as Emmett was originally inspired to create in the original timeline, Edna instead led him to invent a Mental Alignment Meter to assess criminality. After Citizen Brown becomes concerned about Edna's future happiness and Marty is forced to admit that she was unhappy in the original timeline, the two fall out, leading Citizen Brown to comfort Edna.

When Edna and Citizen Brown attempt to sabotage Emmett's demonstration, Marty learns that Edna burned down Irving 'Kid' Tannen's speakeasy (which Doc was originally falsely accused of) and exposes this to the police. Angered that Citizen Brown will not help her further and endeavouring to evade arrest, Edna steals Citizen Brown's DeLorean, fatally runs him over (although he fades away as the timeline is restored) and accidentally activates the time circuits, ending up in 1876. Adopting the alias "Mary Pickford", Edna comes to like what she considers the more moralistic Hill Valley of the era. However, when Beauregard Tannen plans to set up a saloon, Edna decides to burn it down. This accidentally leads to Hill Valley being burned down, with Edna being the only resident where it would have been by 1931; known in nearby Haysville as "Scary Mary", Edna has lived in a guilt-induced fugue state for decades.

After Marty and Doc travel to 1876 to prevent her burning down Hill Valley and to return her to 1931, she is arrested. By 1986, Edna is married to Kid Tannen and is the stepmother of Biff Tannen.

== Other characters ==
=== Marvin Berry ===
Marvin Berry (portrayed by Harry Waters Jr.) is an African-American jazz musician and electric guitar player whose band was hired in Back to the Future to perform at the "Enchantment Under The Sea" dance. He is also the cousin of then-rising musician Chuck Berry. After injuring his hand while helping Marty McFly out of a car's trunk, Marty takes his place as guitarist in the evening's most important dance. When Marty subsequently performs Johnny B. Goode to the audience's excitement, Marvin immediately calls Chuck to introduce him to the new music style, thereby humorously implying that Chuck stole the song to further his musical career. This creates a time paradox, since Marty was playing a song made famous by Chuck Berry, before Berry wrote it, so the song either has no actual creator or Berry was essentially stealing a song from his alternate timeline self. Another theory was that Chuck was going to write it anyway, but after hearing it maybe wrote it sooner than he would have.

=== Otis "Old Man" Peabody ===
Otis Peabody (portrayed by Will Hare) is the patriarch of a 1950s farmer family in Back to the Future. For some obscure reason, he decided to plant pines on his land; while his plan ultimately came to no fruition, the area was decades later converted into a shopping mall named "Twin Pines Mall" as a testimony to his efforts. The town sees Peabody odd including Doc Brown, who himself has a similar reputation. When Marty McFly makes his involuntary time trip back to 1955, he ends up crashing into Peabody's shed with the DeLorean and then flattening one of his two growing pine saplings while escaping. The farmer's family believes that the time-traveling car and its driver in an NBC suit are extraterrestrial. As results, according to a headline of the newspaper Hill Valley Telegraph with Peabody being photographed in a straitjacket, he is committed to a county asylum after claiming that a "'space zombie' wrecked his barn", and after Marty returns to 1985, the mall is found having been (re)named "Lone Pine Mall".

=== Douglas J. Needles ===
Douglas J. Needles (portrayed by Flea in Back to the Future Part II and Back to the Future Part III) is the rival of Marty McFly in Hill Valley High School. Like his school's alumnus, Biff Tannen, Needles also has his own gang and develops a rivalry with Marty (although he doesn't outright bully him like Biff did to George and has no relation to the Tannens). He often goads Marty into doing reckless things, leveraging on Marty's abhorrence of being labeled as a "chicken". The first memorable example of this "if you don't do it, people will think you're chicken" coercion is when Needles challenges Marty to an illegal road race which results in Marty's hitting a Rolls-Royce, breaking his hand in the collision, and being sued by the car's driver, all of which causes Marty's life to begin spiraling downwards. The second instance shown in the movie is when Needles, now a co-worker of Marty's, pressuringly convinces Marty to join him in committing an unnamed corporate-funds-related crime at their place of employment, causing their supervisor to fire Marty when he finds out about Marty's complicity in the plot.

=== Goldie Wilson ===
Goldie Wilson (played by Donald Fullilove in the first film) is a young man working at Lou's Cafe in 1955 who goes on to become the first black Mayor of Hill Valley in the 1980s. By 1985, he creates a controversy when he plans to replace the damaged clock from the Hill Valley Courthouse's clock tower, which continues in 2015 after he left the office. A campaign poster shows the name Goldie in quotation marks, suggesting Goldie is a nickname, presumably in reference to his gold tooth.

He would also have a grandson, Goldie Wilson III (also played by Fullilove) who works as a car salesman in Back to the Future: Part II.

=== Match, Skinhead and 3-D ===
"Match" (portrayed by Billy Zane), Joey "Skinhead" (portrayed by Jeffrey Jay Cohen), and "3-D" (portrayed by Casey Siemaszko) are the three high school boys who make up Biff Tannen's gang in 1955. Their nicknames are only given in the films' novels, screenplays, and credits. Only one of their real names is mentioned in the movies – Biff refers to Skinhead as "Joey" in one of the 1955 scenes in Back to the Future Part II, while outside of the "Enchantment Under the Sea" dance.

In the alternate 1985, the three work in Biff's casino as his bodyguards. Each get their nickname from a distinctive character trait. Match often has a match sticking out of his mouth; Skinhead has very short, close-cropped hair; 3-D is always wearing a pair of anaglyph 3D glasses (a reference to the 3D movies that were popular in the 1950s).

=== Spike, Data and Whitey ===
Leslie "Spike" O'Malley (portrayed by Darlene Vogel), Rafe "Data" Unger (portrayed by Ricky Dean Logan), and Chester "Whitey" Noguera (portrayed by Jason Scott Lee) are high school kids who make up Griff Tannen's gang in 2015.

=== Red the Bum ===
Red (played by George Buck Flower) is a homeless street-bum who resides in downtown Hill Valley in 1985, and in the first film is known to spend the night listening to Eric Clapton's "Heaven is One Step Away" on the radio while lying on a bus stop bench with an advertisement for California raisins on it; in Part II, he can also be seen working on his car outside of Biff's Pleasure Palace. Some fans have speculated he is former mayor Red Thomas (played by Hal Gausman) from the 1950s. However, Bob Gale stated on a DVD commentary track that the name of the bum was merely ad-libbed by Michael J. Fox, and the name stuck. Also, the 1955 re-election poster of Red Thomas shows him to be nearly bald and in his early 60s, considerably older than the late-40s bushy-haired drunk is in 1985.

=== Ito T. Fujitsu ===
Ito T. Fujitsu (played by Jim Ishida) is Marty's future boss in 2015 who fires him after he attempts an illegal act with Needles to get money.
