= Biff Tannen =

Back to the Future character

- Back to the Future character
- Thomas F. Wilson as Biff in Back to the Future (1985)
- First appearance: Back to the Future (1985)
- Last appearance: Back to the Future: The Game (2010)
- Created by: Robert Zemeckis; Bob Gale
- Portrayed by: Thomas F. Wilson
- Voiced by: Kid Beyond (Back to the Future: The Game)

In-universe information
- Family: Irving "Kid" Tannen (father); Gertrude Tannen (grandmother); Griff Tannen (grandson); Buford "Mad Dog" Tannen (great-grandfather)
- Nationality: American

Biff Tannen is a fictional character in the Back to the Future trilogy. Thomas F. Wilson plays Biff in all three films as well as in the Back to the Future: The Ride, and voiced the character in the animated series. Aidan Cutler played him in the original West End production of the first film's stage musical adaptation, and Nathaniel Hackmann plays him in the Broadway production. Biff is the main antagonist of the first and second films, while his great-grandfather, Buford "Mad Dog" Tannen (also played by Wilson), serves as the main antagonist of the third film.

Biff is portrayed as a hulking, belligerent, dim-witted bully who obtains what he wants by intimidating others into doing his work for him, or by cheating. He and his family members are shown to misuse idioms in ways that make them appear foolish and comical, despite their intention to insult or intimidate. He frequently calls others "butthead".

Biff's appearance as a corrupt, ostentatious gambling magnate in the alternate timeline of Back to the Future Part II later drew comparisons to casino owner Donald Trump. Writer Bob Gale said in 2015 that Trump had influenced the character, although Snopes noted that neither Gale nor director Robert Zemeckis had previously mentioned such an influence in the preceding 30 years. The character is named after studio executive Ned Tanen.

== Role in the Back to the Future franchise ==
Biff was born in Hill Valley, California, in 1937. He is the great-grandson of Old West outlaw Buford "Mad Dog" Tannen, son of gangster Irving "Kid" Tannen and grandfather of Griff Tannen. As a vigorously hotheaded teenager in 1955, Biff is known for bullying George McFly into doing his homework for him while he drinks and hangs out with his friends. Feared by most of his schoolmates, his only friends are his gang (Match, Skinhead, and 3-D). The one person at Hill Valley High School that Biff fears is Mr. Strickland. He lives with his grandmother, Gertrude Tannen (voiced by Wilson), at 1809 Mason Street and proudly owns a black 1946 Ford Deluxe convertible. A running gag is his particular dislike for manure, displayed when he is shoved into large quantities of it at multiple points during the films.

In 1985, the still abusive adult Biff is George's supervisor at an unknown company who forces George to do his job for him until George's son, Marty McFly, changes history through his interactions with his teenage father, giving him the confidence to defeat Biff in a fight to save Lorraine Baines, his future wife and Marty's mother. Afterwards, the new 1985 Biff is a servile auto detailer.

In Back to the Future: Part II, an aged and physically decrepit Biff steals Emmett "Doc" Brown's time machine in 2015 and travels back to 1955 to give his teenage self a sports almanac chronicling victories from 1950 to 2000, then heads home to 2015, hoping to gain a happier life as a result of his actions. Consequently, on his 21st birthday in 1958, Biff's younger self wagers money on a horse race listed in the almanac with the victorious steed's name revealed, winning his first million dollars and giving himself prestige and increasingly arrogant confidence. Despite his progressively gaining vast wealth and power through this "fixed" sports-event betting, Biff is still unable to convince Lorraine to marry him; as before, she marries George and starts a family with him. At last, Biff resorts to murdering George in 1973, and uses his money and political influence to cover up any evidence. Without George's supporting her and her family financially, Lorraine reluctantly accepts the well-to-do Biff as her new husband, thus creating a dystopian alternate 1985. He sends Marty off to boarding school in Switzerland. The petulant and arrogantly tempestuous Biff never feels content in the marriage since he treats Lorraine as a prize to be won and possessed, and often lashes out verbally and physically; in a deleted scene, Lorraine eventually gets so fed up with Biff's overbearing hostility and abuse, along with finding out that Biff murdered George, that she shoots him dead some time in the late 1990s. This incident explains why the elderly Biff's actions have no visible effect on the Hill Valley of the future and, after returning to 2015, he clutches his chest in pain, sinks to the pavement, and fades from existence. Marty returns to 1955, carefully avoiding disturbing the events from his previous visit, and battles against the teenage Biff, ultimately recovering the almanac and undoing Biff's alternate timeline by burning it.

=== Biff's relationships ===
In 1955, Biff covets Lorraine Baines, who does not return the sentiments. In the original 1985, Biff's marital status is unknown as no mention of a wife is ever made in the trilogy, though it is revealed in Part II that by 2015, he has a grandson named Griff.

The alternate 1985 reveals that Lorraine, widowed after the murder of George, ended up marrying Biff in 1973. In a video clip after their wedding, Biff is asked, "How does it feel?", to which he replies, "Third time's the charm", implying that he had two previous wives in this continuity.

=== Tannen Family ===
Throughout the Back to the Future franchise, Tannen is shown to have various ancestors or descendants in various timeline who share Biff's character traits, and in the films, are also played by Thomas F. Wilson.

==== Ancestors ====
Back to the Future Part III shows Biff's great-grandfather, Buford "Mad Dog" Tannen, was a vicious outlaw in the Wild West of 1885, Hill Valley. After Doc Brown is accidentally sent back in time to 1885, he was shot in the back by Buford Tannen on September 7, 1885 over a matter of $80 (the combined cost of a poorly-shod horse and a bottle of whiskey that was broken when it threw off Tannen). However, after Marty (using the alias "Clint Eastwood") travels back to 1885 to prevent this, he impulsively accepts Tannen's challenge of a duel; although Marty is briefly destined to die at Tannen's hands, he ends up defeating him in hand-to-hand combat.

Back to the Future: The Game shows Biff's father, Irving "Kid" Tannen (voiced by Owen Thomas), as a gangster and bootlegger during Prohibition in 1931. After Doc Brown (under the alias of "Carl Sagan") is falsely arrested for burning down a speakeasy controlled by Tannen, Tannen had Doc murdered on June 13, 1931. After Marty travels back to 1931 to save him, he unintentionally leads Tannen to killing Arthur 'Artie' McFly, his grandfather, after helping to serve him a subpoena to testify against Kid Tannen. After saving Artie, Doc and Marty accidentally prevent Tannen's arrest on August 25, 1931, leading the Tannens (including two previously non-existent brothers to Biff, Cliff and Riff) to control Hill Valley and become the fifth-most-dangerous crime family in California by 1986. After Doc and Marty ensure Kid's arrest by turning his moll Trixie Trotter (who turned out to be Marty's grandmother Sylvia) against him, their involvement accidentally led Hill Valley to become a totalitarian society, controlled by Edna Strickland and that timeline's version of Emmett Brown. After Marty once again travels back to 1931 to repair the timeline, he unintentionally leads Edna (who is revealed to be the speakeasy arsonist) into a loving relationship with Kid after the former is arrested. In dialogue, it was revealed that Biff was conceived after Kid managed to escape prison for three hours in 1936.

==== Biff's children ====
By 2015, Biff has a teenage grandson, Griff, suggesting that Biff had at least one child by 1985. The animated series reveals that Biff has a son, Biff Jr, while the 2011 video game alludes to him having a daughter, Tiff.

== Character creation ==
The character is named for studio executive Ned Tanen following an incident years earlier where Tanen reacted aggressively to a script being pitched by the film's writers Bob Gale and Robert Zemeckis. Tanen accused the two of attempting to produce an antisemitic work with their 1978 film, I Wanna Hold Your Hand. Drafts of Back to the Future show the character with the middle initial of "H", but this detail was omitted in further revisions.

As the October 2015 date featured in the films approached, media outlets began noting the similarities between the alternate 1985 version of the character and Donald Trump, who at the time Part II was produced had just purchased the Plaza Hotel in New York City and, by 2015, was in the midst of an ultimately successful run for President of the United States. When the comparison was brought to Gale's attention in an interview, he said, "Yeah. That's what we were thinking about". Both The Daily Beast and Rolling Stone note the similarities of Biff's casino penthouse to Trump Plaza Hotel and Casino; additionally, The Beast points out that in Back to the Future Part II:

Biff uses the profits from his 27-story casino... to help shake up the Republican Party, before eventually assuming political power himself, helping transform Hill Valley, California, into a lawless, dystopian wasteland, where hooliganism reigns, dissent is quashed, and wherein Biff encourages every citizen to call him "America's greatest living folk hero".

The fact checking website Snopes, however, doubts this claim, noting that neither Gale nor Zemeckis mentioned anything about Trump being the inspiration for the character until after comparisons began appearing in social media, and saying that it "appeared to be retrofitted to 2015's current events, not prescience on the part of the filmmakers".
