= Hill Valley (Back to the Future) =

Fictional city in the Back to the Future film trilogy

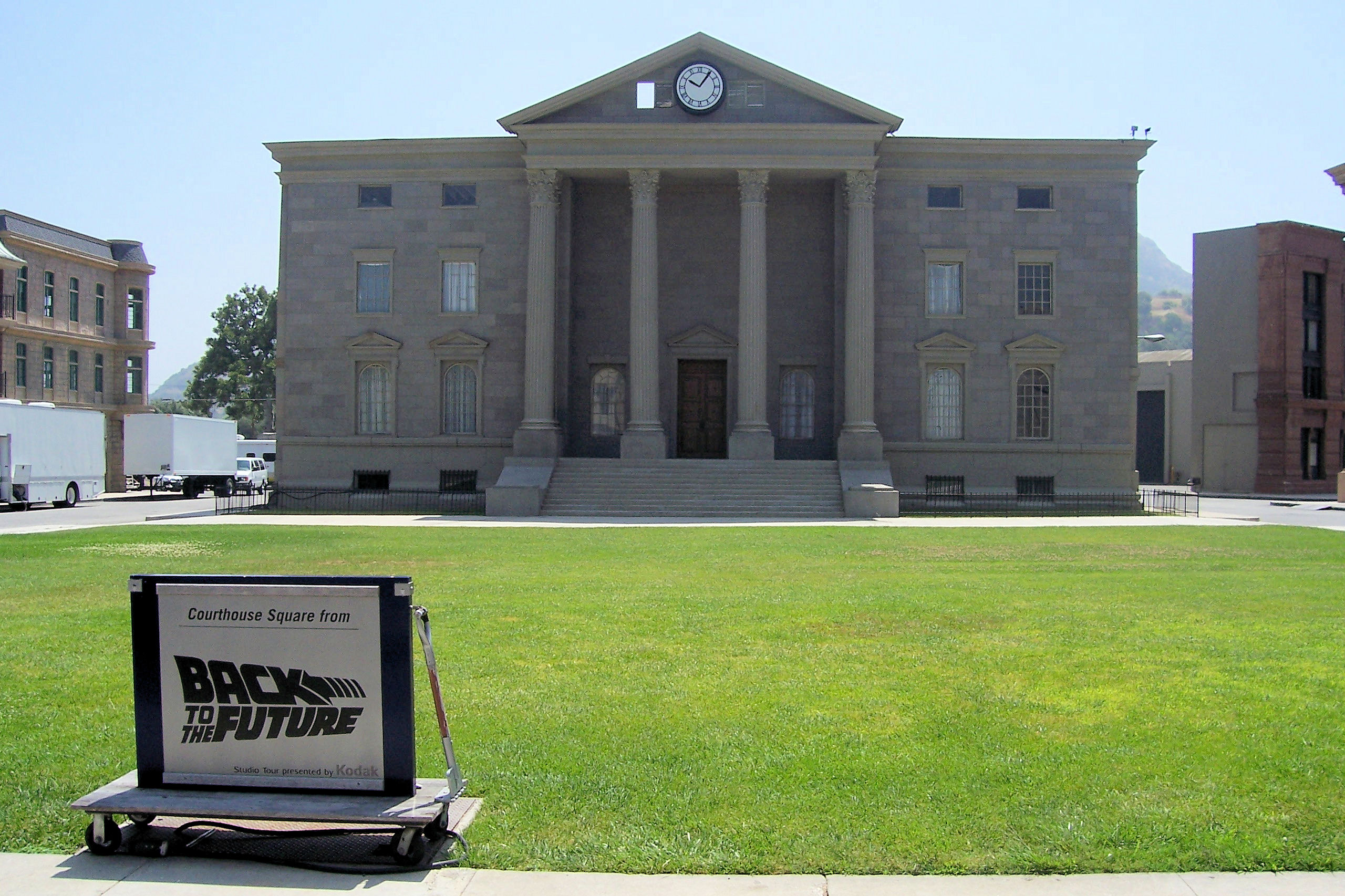
- The set of the Hill Valley courthouse at the Universal Studios backlot, known as Courthouse Square
- First appearance: Back to the Future (1985)
- Created by: Robert Zemeckis; Bob Gale
- Genre: Science-fiction

In-universe information
- Type: City
- Characters: Marty McFly; Emmett Brown; Biff Tannen

Hill Valley is a fictional town in California that serves as the setting of the Back to the Future trilogy and its animated spin-off series. In the trilogy, Hill Valley is seen in four different time periods – 1885, 1955, 1985, and 2015 – as well as in a dystopian alternate 1985. The films contain many sight gags, verbal innuendos and detailed set design elements, from which a detailed and consistent history of the area can be derived.

The city name "Hill Valley" is a joke, being an oxymoron. However, an early script for Back to the Future Part II mentioned that Hill Valley was named after its founder, William "Bill" Hill.

== Production ==
For Back to the Future, the producers considered filming the town square scenes in the real city of Petaluma, California, but soon realized it would be prohibitively expensive and impractical to alter a real place to suit the different eras. Instead, filming was completed on the Universal Studios backlot, where they had more control. The town square set was called Mockingbird Square after the 1962 film To Kill a Mockingbird, but was later known as Courthouse Square. It had been used for many films and television shows dating back to 1948's An Act of Murder, including the first 1959 episode of the sci-fi series The Twilight Zone, called "Where Is Everybody?"

The Hill Valley courthouse can be seen in the movies Bruce Almighty, Gremlins, Bye Bye Birdie, Sneakers, The Offspring's music video "Why Don't You Get a Job?", an episode of Major Dad entitled "Who's That Blonde", and an episode of Buffy The Vampire Slayer. The clock tower was a removable addition, one of many ways in which the Courthouse building has been redressed over the years to suit the needs of a production.

Many of the cars that appear in the 2015 scenes are either modified for the film or concept cars. Examples include Ford Probe, Saab EV-1, Citroën DS 21, Pontiac Banshee Concept, Pontiac Fiero and Volkswagen Beetle. Cars reused from other science fiction films include the "Star Car" from The Last Starfighter (1984) and a "Spinner" from Blade Runner (1982). Griff's car is a modified BMW 633, which was never sold in the convertible form seen in the film.

For Back to the Future Part III, Hill Valley 1885 was filmed in Sonora, California. The producers were able to use the land rent-free under an agreement to leave the set buildings on site. All buildings except the clock tower were left intact after production completed.

On November 6, 1990, an arson fire on the Universal Studios Hollywood backlot destroyed much of Courthouse Square, the setting in which all the other time periods were filmed. The Courthouse survived the devastation and other facades were reconstructed. Another fire on September 6, 1997 damaged Courthouse Square. The backlot facades were rebuilt, with the exception of the facades used for Hill Valley 1885.

On February 14, 1999, a fire at Whittier High School, California, where some, mostly exterior scenes were filmed, destroyed the men's gym there. On June 1, 2008, another fire destroyed part of the rebuilt Courthouse Square backlot and damaged the clock tower.

=== Real-life locations ===
Other real-life shooting locations of Hill Valley landmarks include:

- Doc's house in 1955 is the Gamble House in Pasadena, California. Doc's garage in 1985 was a façade set up next to a Burger King on North Victory Boulevard in Burbank, California.
- Twin Pines/Lone Pine Mall is actually the Puente Hills Mall in Industry, California.
- Marty's Lyon Estates house in 1985 is actually at 9303 Roslyndale Avenue, Pacoima, California.
- The 1955 Lyon Estates field is actually along farmland between the city borders of Chino, California and Corona, California.
- Peabody's Twin Pines Ranch is really at Golden Oak Ranch, which is owned by The Walt Disney Company and used in many Disney productions.
- The houses of George McFly, Lorraine Baines, and Biff Tannen in 1955 are all in South Pasadena, California.
- The train that hit the DeLorean and the Futuristic Train were parked in Port Hueneme, California.
- John F. Kennedy Drive is actually Victory Boulevard in Burbank, California.
- The River Road Tunnel is actually Observatory Tunnel at Griffith Park in Los Angeles. The actual tunnel is only a fraction of the length of the one depicted in Part II.
- The Pohatchee Drive-In Theater where Marty initially travels from 1955 back to 1885 was not a real theater. It was constructed full-scale for the third film in Monument Valley, Utah (near the Arizona/Utah border) and was torn down after that portion of filming was completed.
- Marty's race with Needles was shot on Doris Avenue in Oxnard, California.
- Hilldale in 1985 was filmed at Doris Avenue and Oxford Drive in Oxnard, California.
- Hilldale in 2015 was filmed at Oakhurst Street and Somerset Avenue in El Monte, California.
- Hill Valley High School was filmed at Whittier High School in Whittier, California.

== Location ==
According to an 1885 Central Pacific Railroad map in Back to the Future Part III, Hill Valley is located in Northern California in the Sierra Nevada. Dialogue in Back to the Future Part II and Back to the Future Part III places it in "Hill County", a fictional county in California.

After Marty decides against racing Needles at the end of Back to the Future Part III, the zip code 95420 is visible on the letterhead of the printout Jennifer brought back with her from 2015 announcing Marty's termination from Cusco. This zip code corresponds with Caspar, California, an unincorporated community in Mendocino County.

== Fictional history ==
The following information is taken directly from places and events shown or mentioned in the three films:

=== Early settlement ===
The town of Hill Valley was first settled in 1850 and incorporated in 1865. By the 1880s, it was connected by railroad to San Francisco. Construction of a new county courthouse was well underway in 1885, the setting of Back to the Future Part III, in which a new clock was dedicated for the building. The Shonash Ravine Bridge was completed in the summer of 1886, around the same time the ravine was renamed Clayton Ravine in memory of Clara Clayton, a school teacher who died from falling into the chasm. In a revised timeline where Doc Brown saved Clara's life, the town renamed it Eastwood Ravine when it is believed that "Clint Eastwood" (an alias used by Marty McFly) fell into the ravine.

=== Town square ===
By 1955, as seen in the first two Back to the Future films, the area around the courthouse has developed into the downtown of Hill Valley. In front of the courthouse is a grass-covered town square, with stores, two movie theaters, Essex and Town, and cafés on the surrounding streets. Downtown also features a Texaco station, a Bank of America branch, and a Studebaker dealership. A key moment in the town's fictional history takes place on Saturday, November 12, 1955, at 10:04 p.m. PST, when lightning strikes the courthouse's clock tower, freezing the clock at 10:04. The clock is never repaired and becomes a local landmark, left in its non-functional state at the behest of the Hill Valley Preservation Society. In the revised timeline, the broken piece of ledge from Doc Brown's successful attempt to channel lightning from the clock tower is likewise never repaired, as can be seen when Marty returns to 1985 and in 2015, but not in the alternate 1985.

In Marty's original timeline, many of the town square businesses have moved or closed down by 1985. The new businesses which replaced them include a second-hand shop, a yoga studio, and an adult book store, and the Studebaker dealership becomes a Toyota dealership, but is still owned by the Statlers, though the Texaco station and Bank of America branch remained. The Essex movie theater now shows porno movies while the Town Theater is used for church services, and the courthouse is in a state of disrepair, and at night at least one homeless person (called "Red" by Marty) sleeps on the town square park benches.

The grassy park outside of the courthouse has been converted into a parking lot. "That was always one of the major elements of the story even in its earliest incarnation," screenwriter Bob Gale says in The Making of Back to the Future, "was to take a place and show what happens to it over a period of thirty years. What happened to everybody's home town is obviously the same thing. They built the mall out in the boonies, and killed all the business downtown, and everything changed."

By the 21st century, the downtown area has experienced a revival. The courthouse has been converted into the Courthouse Mall. Businesses have begun to move back into and around the town square and the parking lot has been replaced by a pond. The clock on top of the courthouse is still preserved at 10:04 and the mall's logo is an illustration of a lightning bolt striking the clock tower. The Town Theater/Assembly of Christ building has been converted to an art museum with a mural painted on the front side of the building above the marquee. The Texaco station remains, while the Toyota dealership is now a Pontiac dealership, though in reality General Motors discontinued the Pontiac brand in 2010 as part of its bankruptcy.

Signs that say "Welcome to Hill Valley" are seen in 1955, 1985 and 2015. Both 1955 and 2015 signs have symbols representing the Rotary, Kiwanis and Lions clubs. The 1955 sign has the logos of the YMCA, Jaycees, and Future Farmers of America while the 2015 sign has those of the Neighborhood Crime Watch eye logo and the 4-H Club clover logo. The "Welcome to Hill Valley" sign in 1985 does not contain any signage representing any clubs and mentions the name of Mayor Goldie Wilson.

In the alternate 1985, Marty is seen walking over the sign, which has been knocked down and an 'E' has been spray painted over the 'I' in HILL VALLEY making the name HELL VALLEY. This sign does not display the name of the mayor but instead the words "A Nice Place to Live" as seen in 1955. A sign referencing US Highway 395 is shown next to the Town Square in 1955.

=== Twin Pines Mall / Lone Pine Mall ===
Twin Pines Mall is a shopping center located outside Hill Valley, where Doctor Emmett Brown first tests his time machine, making his dog Einstein the first time traveler in the world. The site where the mall was filmed for the movie is actually Puente Hills Mall, located in City of Industry, California. The J.C. Penney location seen in the movie has been shut down and is now occupied by a 24 Hour Fitness center. The mall's name changed to Lone Pine Mall after Marty went back to 1985, because he accidentally destroyed one of the two baby pine trees for which it was named, as he fled an irate Old Man Peabody, whose barn the DeLorean crashed into upon arriving in 1955.

=== Alternate history ===
In Back to the Future Part II, a nightmarish alternate version of Hill Valley, dubbed 1985A by Doc, is depicted with a partial history. Due to the influence of the powerful and corrupt Biff Tannen, gambling was legalized in 1979. Tannen's toxic waste reclamation plants were built downtown, polluting the air and leading to pollution alerts to be issued. All of the local businesses in the downtown area closed or relocated and were replaced with strip clubs, porn theaters, and brothels. Tannen bought off the police. Consequently, crime increased and biker gangs settled in the city. Hill Valley's public schools burned down and the courthouse was converted into Biff Tannen's Pleasure Paradise Casino and Hotel.

The clock on the courthouse remains at 10:04, although despite the damage the Doc did to the tower's platform in 1955, for whatever reason, it now seems to have disappeared. Biff murdered George McFly, Marty's dad, on March 15, 1973, so that he could marry George's wife Lorraine, Marty's mom, making him a corrupt family man as well as town ruler. He helped Richard Nixon remain President of the United States until at least 1985. Biff's effect on history affected the whole world – in this version of history, the Vietnam War was still ongoing by May 1983.

According to the original script for Back to the Future Part II a partial view of the alternate 2015 was also to be depicted. By this time Biff now owns half the state of California with his influence having gained his son, Biff Jr., the seat of governor and they uphold their power and corruption with an army of large, powerful cyborg police officers, which now has its 5 star resort in what would have been the courthouse mall in 2015.

=== Back to the Future: The Game alternate history ===
Another timeline, branching off the events of Back to the Future: The Game, sees Irving "Kid" Tannen, the father of Biff Tannen and a prohibitionism era mafioso, avoid his lengthy incarceration for illegal consumption and sale of alcohol. In the alternate 1986 Biff Tannen has two brothers, and the Tannen family is a recognized crime family, ruling over Hill Valley with an iron grip.

In yet another alternate history, branching off the events of Back to the Future: The Game, in 1931 a teen Emmett Brown, fell in love with the young journalist Edna Strickland: as a result she married Emmett, convincing him to pursue sociological and political goals. She managed to win him over by keeping him interested in science, but in a manner that his scientific skills could be used to control people instead of using science to understand mysteries and for the betterment of humanity. Under "Citizen Brown"'s influence, by 1985 Hill Valley is a technological dystopia, where Emmett Brown oversees a fascist regime, controlling every single activity of his citizens, routinely brainwashed and spied over.

In this new Hill Valley, in a reversal of their usual roles, Marty McFly is a square, serious and devoted to Emmett Brown to a fault, as the "original" McFly is dismayed to discover, and Jennifer is a rebellious rocker, a wild child with an unpredictable streak. Lorraine is again a mildly obese, inebriated sad woman. George has reverted to be the loser he is in the first, original timeline, although his oppressor is big government instead of Biff. George reprises his "peeping Tom" activities as seen in Back to the Future, under the guise of monitoring security camera footage for Citizen Brown.

Biff Tannen is now one part of the Citizen Plus program, brainwashed into obedience. Hill Valley is a technologically advanced marvel, owned by a now rich and powerful Emmett Brown, with even the iconic Town Hall replaced by a huge pane with the E. Brown Industries symbol. Since in this timeline Emmett Brown never developed time-travel technology, the events of the original series never took place, and the Eastwood Ravine is still known as the Clayton Ravine, as no one saved Clara from her death.

The last attempt to fix the damages involved with the events of Back to the Future: The Game ends with even a more radical change. Edna Strickland travels under an assumed name to 1876 to act as a moral guide of the newly founded Hill Valley. After a failed confrontation with Beauregard Tannen, a Confederate soldier who built and founded the Palace Saloon, she accidentally causes a conflagration that consumes Hill Valley, turning it into a ghost town with herself as the only resident. As a result of her actions, Marty and Doc witness 1931 Hill Valley disappear and be replaced by a valley made of hills, implying that this was how Hill Valley got its name in the first place.

Again, Marty and Doc manage to restore the continuity, that now sports minor alterations: Arthur and Silvia, Marty's grandparents, prepone their marriage to 1931. It was 1936 in the original timeline. Doc Brown spends more time in 1986 and less traveling through time. Kid Tannen is now reformed, married to Edna Strickland and having a better influence over Biff.

== Places ==
Many family businesses are passed down from generation to generation in Hill Valley. As a result, the city changes but remains similar from one generation to the next, as businesses are updated but rarely change. These recurring elements were a deliberate choice on the part of the filmmakers. The production designer of Back to the Future Part II, Rick Carter, is quoted in a DVD extra as saying, "The future is built on the present." Director Robert Zemeckis adds that the continuity between the different eras in Hill Valley's history is an example of the adage, "the more things change, the more they stay the same".

The following is a list of such places. When a place is not seen or mentioned in a movie, it is marked unknown. Some buildings shown in 1885 scenes are actually located further down the street in an area not shown in the first two movies.

| place No. | 1885 | 1955 | 1985 | Alternate 1985 | 2015 |
|---|---|---|---|---|---|
| 1 | Hill Valley Courthouse and Clock Tower (under construction) | Hill Valley Courthouse and Clock Tower | Department of Social Services | Biff Tannen's Pleasure Paradise Casino & Hotel | Hill Valley Courthouse Mall |
| 1 | Hill Valley Courthouse and Clock Tower (under construction) | Hill Valley Courthouse and Clock Tower | Department of Social Services | The Biff Tannen Museum | Hill Valley Courthouse Mall |
| 2 | —N/a | Town Theater (showing The Atomic Kid) | Town Theater (as the Assembly of Christ Church) | Biffco Toxic Waste Reclamation Plant | Hill Valley Museum of Art: "A Bellman Retrospective" |
| 3 | —N/a | Holt's Diner | Elmo's Rib Cafe | Biffco Toxic Waste Reclamation Plant | Hill Valley Museum of Art: "A Bellman Retrospective" |
| 4 | Honest Joe Statler's Fine Horses (in different location — this spot actually empty) | Statler Studebaker | Statler Toyota | PIG Mart | Pontiac Sales and Hover Conversions |
| 5 | —N/a | Ruth's Frock Shop | Goodwill Industries | Tanya Exotic Sex Goddess | Hyatas All Natural Earth-Grown Fruits |
| 6 | —N/a | Jacobson & Field Attorneys at Law | Loans | Bad Rap Bail Bonds | Simulex |
| 7 | (under construction) | Western Auto Stores | empty store (displaying "Re-Elect Mayor Goldie Wilson" signage) | Bondage | Hill Valley Gifts / The Hydroponic Gardner |
| 8 | Wells Fargo & Co | Bluebird Motel | Al's Tattoo Art (out of business, for sale) | Video Nude Hardcore Movies | Sight Sound and Mind |
| 8 | Wells Fargo & Co | Bluebird Motel | Al's Tattoo Art (out of business, for sale) | Pawn Shop | Sight Sound and Mind |
| 9 | —N/a | Elite Barber Shop | empty store (sign on window saying "We Moved to Twin Pines Mall") | Bangkok Sauna & Asian Massage | Mr. Perfect All-Natural Steroids |
| 10 | —N/a | Hill Valley Stationers | Cupid's Adult Book Store | Hell Hole XXX | Eclipse — Contemporary & Traditional Lighting Store |
| 11 | —N/a | Zale's Jewelers | Abrams Brokerage Corporation | Hardcore X | Pizza Hut |
| 12 | Unknown | J.D. Armstrong Realty | Loans | Peeparama | True Blues |
| 13 | Unknown | Ask Mr. Foster Travel Service | | Naughty and Naked | Uniglobe Travel |
| 14 | Marshal's Office | Bank of America | Bank of America | Naughty XXX | Hill Valley Transit bus stop (second floor advertising Goldie Wilson Hover Conversions and Major League Baseball World Series Sports-Flash news on a holographic billboard sign) |
| 15 | Palace Saloon | Lou's Cafe | Lou's Fitness Aerobics Center | War Zone Bar | Cafe 80's |
| 16 | Barber shop | Roy's Record Store | The Third Eye | Time to Shoot Photo Store | Blast From The Past Antique Store |
| 17 | Doc's Blacksmith shop (different building) | Texaco full-service station | Texaco gas station/food mart | (area cluttered with piles of junk furniture and other garbage) | 7-Eleven (first floor) |
| 17 | Doc's Blacksmith shop (different building) | Texaco full-service station | Texaco gas station/food mart | (area cluttered with piles of junk furniture and other garbage) | Texaco automated Havoline station (second floor) |
| 18 | Unknown | Hal's Bike Shop | Hog Heaven | French Fantasies | The Bot Shoppe |
| 19 | Livery and Feed Stable | Lawrence Building | Broadway Florist | French Fantasies | Hill Valley Surrogate Parenting Center |
| 20 | (under construction) | Essex Theater (as a mainstream movie house showing Cattle Queen of Montana) | Essex Theater (as an adult movie house showing Orgy, American Style XXX) | Hill Valley Theater of Live Sex Acts | Holomax Theater (showing Jaws 19: "This time it's really, really personal.") |
| 21 | Hill Valley Telegraph | Building with Sherwin-Williams Paint billboard sign | | Toxic Waste Reclamation Plant | Unknown (office building displaying Skyway Information) |
| 22 | —N/a | Lyon Estates (under development) | Lyon Estates (middle-class neighborhood) | Lyon Estates (rough neighborhood) | Lyon Estates (low-class neighborhood) |
| 23 | Empty land near Shonash Ravine | Farmland near Clayton/Eastwood Ravine | Hilldale, a new housing development near Clayton/Eastwood Ravine with 1980s-style homes and described as being a rather affluent part of Hill Valley | Neighborhood destroyed, now extremely dangerous | Hilldale, a rough neighborhood |
| 24 | Hill Valley School (in different building than later schools) | Hill Valley High School | | Remains of Hill Valley High School (burned down in 1979) | Hill Valley High School |
| 25 | Unknown | Gaynor's Hideaway Bar | | Dee Dee's Delight Bar | Fusion Bar |
| 26 | McFly Farm | Twin Pines Ranch | Twin Pines/Lone Pine Mall | Lone Pine Mall | Lone Pine Fli-Drome |
| 27 | Empty lot | Brown Mansion | Doc Brown's garage | Doc Brown's garage | Doctor Brown's futuristic laboratory |
| 27 | Empty lot | Brown Mansion | Burger King | Doc Brown's garage | Doctor Brown's futuristic laboratory |

== Reception ==
Back to the Future has been criticized for presenting an idealized 1950s setting almost entirely populated by White people, and contrasting this with a more troubled 1985 town run by a Black mayor. In Black Space: Imagining Race in Science Fiction Film, Adilifu Nama writes, "The film performs robust semiotic work around race by symbolically associating the degraded cityscape of Hill Valley with inept black leadership. Marty's personal family crisis, marked by a socially impotent father and an alcoholic mother, is mirrored in the condition of Hill Valley. Boarded-up businesses, schoolyard graffiti, and an adult-video bookstore placed in the center of town indicate that the Hill Valley of 1985 is suffering from severe economic and moral decline. Alongside these visual signifiers of socioeconomic crisis are posters of the Black mayor, Goldie Wilson, scattered throughout downtown Hill Valley."

== See also ==
- Back to the Future (franchise)
