= Back to the Future: The Game =

- Developer: Telltale Games
- Publisher: Telltale Games
- Directors: Dennis Lenart; Peter Tsaykel; Eric Parsons; Dave Grossman
- Producer: Brett Tosti
- Designers: Mike Stemmle; Andy Hartzell; Dave Grossman; Jonathan Straw
- Programmers: Randy Tudor; Keenan Patterson
- Artists: Derek Sakai; Peter Tsaykel
- Writers: Mike Stemmle; Andy Hartzell; JD Straw
- Composer: Jared Emerson-Johnson
- Series: Back to the Future
- Engine: Telltale Tool
- Platforms: Microsoft Windows; OS X PlayStation 3 PlayStation 4 Wii; Xbox 360; Xbox One iOS
- Release: Episode 1: WW: December 22, 2010; EU: January 20, 2011 (PS3); NA: February 15, 2011 (PS3); WW: February 17, 2011 (iOS); Episode 2: WW: February 16, 2011; NA: March 29, 2011 (PS3); EU: March 31, 2011 (PS3); WW: April 20, 2011 (iOS); Episode 3: WW: March 29, 2011; EU: April 14, 2011 (PS3); NA: May 3, 2011 (PS3); WW: May 26, 2011 (iOS); Episode 4: WW: April 29, 2011; WW: June 2, 2011 (iOS); EU: June 2, 2011 (PS3); NA: June 7, 2011 (PS3); Episode 5: WW: June 23, 2011; WW: July 21, 2011 (iOS); NA: July 26, 2011 (PS3); Complete pack (Retail): NA: September 29, 2011 (PC); NA: October 25, 2011 (PS3 & Wii); EU: May 4, 2012 (PC, PS3 & Wii); NA: October 13, 2015 (PS4, X360 & XONE); EU: October 16, 2015 (PS4, X360 & XONE)
- Genre: Graphic adventure
- Mode: Single-player

Back to the Future: The Game is an episodic graphic adventure video game based on the Back to the Future film franchise. The game was developed and published by Telltale Games as part of a licensing deal with Universal Pictures. Bob Gale, the co-creator, co-writer, and co-producer of the film trilogy, assisted Telltale in writing the game's story. Original actors Michael J. Fox and Christopher Lloyd allowed the developers to use their likenesses in the game for the lead characters Marty McFly and Doc Brown, respectively. Although Lloyd reprises his role as Doc, A.J. LoCascio voices the role of Marty, while Fox later appeared to voice two cameo roles in the final episode, reprising his role as Marty as three future versions of him, in addition to voicing his forefather William.

The game is split up into five episodes available on multiple gaming platforms, the first episode released for Microsoft Windows and OS X on December 22, 2010. PlayStation 3 and iOS versions followed in February 2011. Episodes 2 through 5 were released throughout February to June 2011, with the final episode released on June 23. Telltale published the series as retail products for the PlayStation 3 and Wii consoles for North America. Deep Silver published the retail PlayStation 3 and Wii versions for Europe on May 4, 2012. To commemorate the films' 30th anniversary, Telltale Games released the game on PlayStation 4, Xbox 360, and Xbox One on October 13, 2015. The ports feature updated voice work from Thomas F. Wilson, who played Biff Tannen in the films (Biff was voiced by Kid Beyond in the original release).

== Gameplay ==
Back to the Future: The Game is a graphic adventure played from a third-person perspective. The player controls Marty to explore the 3D environments using either the keyboard, mouse or game controller to move. The player can have Marty examine objects, talk to non-player characters (initiating dialog through conversation trees), and perform specific actions in order to solve puzzles and progress the game. Some items can be picked up and stored in Marty's inventory, and then can be used later to interact with other characters or objects. The game provides a list of current goals for the player to complete to advance the game. The player can access a hint system, revealing one clue at a time from a number of cryptic clues for how to solve a specific puzzle.

== Plot ==
Six months following the events of Back to the Future Part III, Emmett "Doc" Brown has long been absent from 1986, leading the bank to foreclose on his home and properties. Marty McFly arrives in time to the foreclosure sale to prevent Biff Tannen from acquiring Doc's notebooks on time travel, but is shocked to suddenly discover the DeLorean time machine, which he thought was previously destroyed, (Note: As depicted in the 1990 film Back to the Future Part III.) has returned outside his house, with both Doc's dog Einstein and a recording of Doc explaining the DeLorean's automatic retrieval system should Doc have fallen on hard times. Being plagued by a recent nightmare of Doc fading away, Marty sets out to investigate, discovering that Doc, under the alias "Carl Sagan", was arrested for arson of an illegal speakeasy and killed by Irving "Kid" Tannen in August 1931.

Marty returns to 1931 to rescue Doc, using a rocket-powered drill invented by Doc's younger self Emmett, a legal clerk at the time. Despite the drill being successfully built, the breakout fails due to Kid's interference, but the rescue is successful. Marty starts fading away when attempting to return home, discovering his grandfather Arthur "Artie" McFly, Kid's accountant, was killed after being subpoenaed into testifying against Kid, and thus have to make another trip to rescue him. While Artie is saved, Marty and Doc return to an alternate 1986 where, due to Kid never having been convicted, the Tannens have become a powerful crime family who have dominated Hill Valley. They are forced to again return to 1931 to convict Kid with the help of Kid's moll Trixie Trotter, finally saving their supposed future from Tannen control.

However, their actions cause Emmett to fall in love with local reporter Edna Strickland, who takes him away from his supposed destiny in watching Frankenstein — which would inspire him to pursue his scientific career — and this creates an alternate 1986 in which Edna used him and his inventions to turn Hill Valley into a quasi-Orwellian conformist society. Marty, who is considered a model citizen in this reality, is forced to break rules to get an audience with Doc — now called "Citizen Brown" — and painstakingly tries to persuade him about his supposed original destiny. After Citizen Brown learns that Edna usurped his "Citizen Plus" rehabilitation program to brainwash Hill Valley into perfect conformity, he agrees with Marty. Edna detains Citizen Brown and Marty, who manage to escape with the help of the alternate versions of Marty's father George and girlfriend Jennifer Parker.

Citizen Brown repairs the DeLorean and returns with Marty to 1931 to prevent Emmett and Edna from falling in love. However, earlier damage to the DeLorean caused it to arrive several months late. While Marty is adamant in sabotaging Emmett and Edna's relationship, Citizen Brown worries about what would happen to Edna, with the two falling out and Brown driving away with the DeLorean. While Marty successfully destroys Emmett and Edna's relationship and even inspires Emmett to return to inventing even without watching Frankenstein, Citizen Brown picks up a distraught Edna, explaining everything and offering to help thwart Marty's plan.

At the Hill Valley Science Expo, despite Edna and Citizen Brown's attempts, Marty is successful in helping Emmett accomplish his original flying car project and even in standing up for himself against his father, Judge Erhardt Brown, who then reconcile. Enraged that the plan was foiled and that Citizen Brown will not help her further, Edna hijacks the DeLorean and fatally runs him over (before he fades away), inadvertently activating the time machine. As the original Doc arrives in 1931 in another DeLorean with instructions given by Marty, Hill Valley disappears. They learn that Edna — exposed as the real speakeasy arsonist — had inadvertently destroyed Hill Valley when trying to burn down a saloon Beauregard Tannen was building. Traveling to 1876, Doc and Marty manage to stop Edna from committing arson and return her to 1931, where she is arrested and jailed alongside Kid, and Citizen Brown's DeLorean fades away.

Doc and Marty return to 1986 where the estate sale never occurred as the Browns' reconciliation allowed them to remain part-time in Hill Valley and Edna and Kid had married. Doc's original disappearance is explained; he was investigating Marty's grandmother Sylvia (revealed to be Trixie, which was a stage name) for research into an album on the McFly family history as a graduation gift for Marty. Suddenly, three DeLoreans appear, each driven by a different future version of Marty, asking the original Marty and Doc to help repair their timelines. Marty and Doc, however, decide to enjoy the present for a while and leave the alternate Martys arguing with each other as they depart to an unknown time in their DeLorean.

== Development ==
Back to the Future: The Game was announced by developer Telltale Games in early June 2010, as part of a licensing deal to create video games based on Universal Pictures' Back to the Future and Jurassic Park film series. The title is split-up into five episodes and was available for Microsoft Windows, OS X, PlayStation 3, Wii (as a single retail release) and iOS.

An in-development screenshot showing the simple user interface and the character designs for Marty McFly and Doc Brown. Both Michael J. Fox and Christopher Lloyd allowed the developers to use their likenesses within the game.

The development team sought input from fans on various scenarios by means of an online survey and brought in trilogy co-creator, co-writer and co-producer Bob Gale as story consultant. Several concepts he and director Robert Zemeckis had originally conceived for Part II, such as the exploration of the Prohibition era and Doc's family history, were reworked into the game. Telltale Games found adhering to the films' established timelines to be one of the greatest challenges regarding the development of the script. Many ideas had to be scrapped due to conflicts that would have caused paradoxes with the stories of the films. Gale stated that although the game is not part of the series canon, it is possible that it could take place in alternate timelines.

Three months after its initial announcement, the team revealed the first piece of concept art for the protagonists, created by artist Ryan Jones and based on actors Michael J. Fox and Christopher Lloyd, who allowed their likenesses to be used for the in-game characters. Season designer and writer Michael Stemmle emphasized that the game's graphics would take a less realistic and more stylized approach while trying to stay true to the feel of the trilogy. The puzzles were designed to rely on applying items in the inventory to characters and objects as the developers did not think of Marty as a protagonist that would build a gadget from various parts.

=== Audio ===
As Michael J. Fox was unavailable to reprise his role as Marty for the game, newcomer A.J. LoCascio voiced the character instead, though Fox later provided voice work for Marty's great-grandfather William in the fifth and final episode of the game, as well as for the three futuristic versions of Marty who appear in the game's final cutscene. LoCascio was able to get the part when his audition sample ended up in the email inbox of voice director Julian Kwasneski, and managed to impress both Gale and Lloyd with how closely it resembled the sound of Fox's voice during the time the trilogy was filmed. Lloyd returned to voice Doc Brown and began his first recording session for the game in late September 2010. Later, Claudia Wells joined the cast, reprising her role as Jennifer Parker from the first film. Kid Beyond provided the voice for Biff Tannen in place of actor Tom Wilson in the game's original release, but Wilson returned to voice the character for the 30th anniversary re-release. James Arnold Taylor voiced the younger Emmett Brown. Though the game features other returning characters including George and Lorraine McFly, voicework for these characters are provided by a variety of voice actors in the Bay Area. The song Back in Time by Huey Lewis and the News, which was written for the first film, appears in the game.

The full voice cast for the games is listed below:

The game's primary protagonists

- A.J. LoCascio — Marty McFly/Leech
  - Michael J. Fox — William McFly/Future Marty McFly
- Christopher Lloyd — Dr. Emmett Brown/Citizen Brown/Jacques Douteux
  - James Arnold Taylor — Young Emmett Brown
- Andrew Chaikin (original release) / Thomas F. Wilson (2015 re-release) — Biff Tannen
- Owen Thomas — Kid Tannen/Beauregard Tannen
- Michael X. Sommers — George McFly/Arthur McFly
- Aimee Miles — Lorraine Baines McFly
- Claudia Wells — Jennifer Parker
- Melissa Hutchison — Trixie Trotter
- Rebecca Sweitzer — Edna Strickland
  - Shannon Nicholson — Young Edna Strickland
- Mark Barbolak — Detective Danny Parker/Detective Danny Parker Jr.

=== Promotion ===
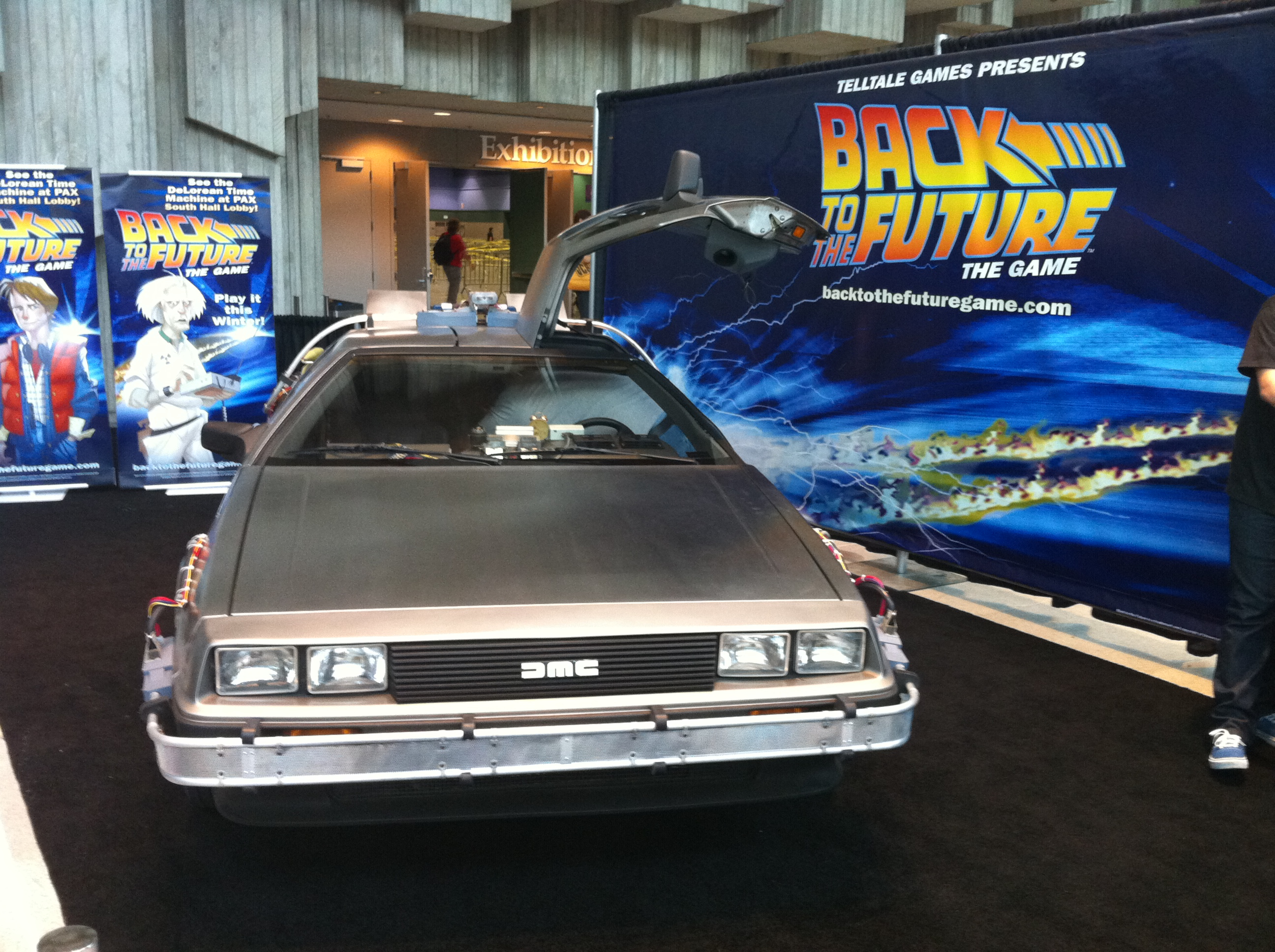
Telltale Games promoted the series at the 2010 Penny Arcade Expo in Seattle by bringing along a replica of the time machine from the films.

To promote the title, Telltale brought a replica of the DeLorean time machine as part of their booth display at the 2010 Penny Arcade Expo which occurred shortly after the game's announcement. Prior to the game's release, Telltale Games published their first Facebook game, Back to the Future: Blitz Through Time, with mechanics similar to Bejeweled Blitz, to tie in with the episodic series. It has been taken down as of 2012.

A voucher for a free copy of the first episode of the series was included in the 25th Anniversary Blu-ray release of the Back to the Future trilogy on October 26, 2010. A promotional offer was made on Telltale's web site to download a free copy as well. Via this promotion, however, the first episode began distribution on February 16, 2011. As of April 2011, Telltale offered the first episode for free for anyone with a registered account at their website. As a pre-order bonus, Telltale offered buyers a free copy of Puzzle Agent, access to a pre-release insider forum on their web site, and stated that they would donate one dollar to the Michael J. Fox Foundation for Parkinson's Research for each pre-order.

== Release ==
The first episode of Back to the Future: The Game was released for free via Telltale Games' website, for both PC and OS X on December 22, 2010, with a later release for the PlayStation 3, also made free on the PlayStation Store, on February 15, 2011, and iOS two days later.

Subsequent episodes were later released for each of these platforms on the following dates:

- Episode 2 was released on PC and OS X on February 16, 2011; on PlayStation 3 on March 29, 2011; and on iOS on April 20, 2011.
- Episode 3 was released on PC and OS X on March 29, 2011; on PlayStation 3 on May 3, 2011; and on iOS on May 26, 2011.
- Episode 4 was released on PC and OS X on April 29, 2011; on PlayStation 3 on June 7, 2011; and on iOS on June 2, 2011
- Episode 5 was released on PC and OS X on June 23, 2011; on PlayStation 3 on July 26, 2011; and on iOS on July 21, 2011.

The same year, a full retail version consisting of all five episodes for PC was released on September 29, and on PlayStation 3 and Wii on October 25, across North America; EU versions for all three platforms were released the following year. Additional releases for PlayStation 4, Xbox 360, and Xbox One were released globally in October 2015.

The game was free for PlayStation Plus subscribers in January 2012.

The game was delisted from all digital storefronts by the end of 2018, following the closure of Telltale Games.

== Reception ==
Aggregate review scores
Game	GameRankings	Metacritic
"It's About Time"	80.32%	74/100
"Get Tannen!"	76.86%	74/100
"Citizen Brown"	75.57%	71/100
"Double Visions"	73.64%	71/100
"Outatime"	78.92%	75/100

Back to the Future: The Game received generally positive reviews. The first episode, "It's About Time", was praised by several reviewers as an effective start to the series. IGN's Greg Miller gave the episode a score of 8.5/10, writing, "it's a movie-inspired game that doesn't suck. Instead, it pushes the characters in interesting directions and whips up a good story". Miller praised Telltale Games for recreating the Back to the Future universe with attention to detail and for the iteration's witty dialogue. Nathan Meunier of GameSpot gave the episode a 7.5/10 score, saying the series "shows a lot of promise with its debut installment". The review added that "the entertaining story that follows is enhanced by believable character interactions, imbuing the adventure with a great sense of authenticity". Meunier did note that the installment was "surprisingly light on challenge and content". Ben PerLee from GameZone summarized his praise of the game by saying it is a "feel good cinematic experience that any fan of Back to the Future will want to check out, and everyone else would do well to check it out". PALGN gave the installment a 7/10, saying that fans of the films "will find plenty to love with all of the callbacks and nostalgic moments", but calling the game's pace slow and the 1930s setting uninspiring. The review concluded: "Fans will delight in the more nostalgic and clever moments of "It's About Time", but it's a short, easy and somewhat bland introduction to the series, which we hope still has time to get a lot better". In a 2/5 stars review, The Escapist said the first episode of the game "doesn't quite get the tone [of the films] right and fails to offer up much compelling gameplay". The reviewer called the setting, situations, and characters "bland", further describing the characters as "cardboard nobodies", and did not review the rest of the series. The consensus among critics was that the voice acting was exceptional, with particular praise directed at A.J. LoCascio's impersonation of Michael J. Fox as Marty McFly. Most reviewers were critical of the episode's puzzles as being too simplistic and easy. Review aggregator Metacritic assigned the episode an average review score of 74/100.

Back to the Future: The Game was Telltale's most successful franchise prior to the release of The Walking Dead: The Game.

The game reached number 3 in the PS3 sales charts.

== Other media ==
In 2016, IDW Publishing released Back to the Future: Citizen Brown, a comic book of the game and adapted by Bob Gale and Erik Burnham. It was released over five issues from May to September. The comic follows the story of the game albeit with some minor changes, which according to Bob Gale: "...I convinced IDW to go back in time with me to correct a few mistakes we made the first time around, as well as to set up some things that pay off cleverly in true BTTF style".
