= McFly (disambiguation) =

McFly is an English pop rock band.

Fictional McFly can also refer to:

- Marty McFly, the protagonist in the Back to the Future film series
- George McFly, Marty's father
- Lorraine McFly, Marty's mother
