= De Luxe Ford =

Range of Ford cars

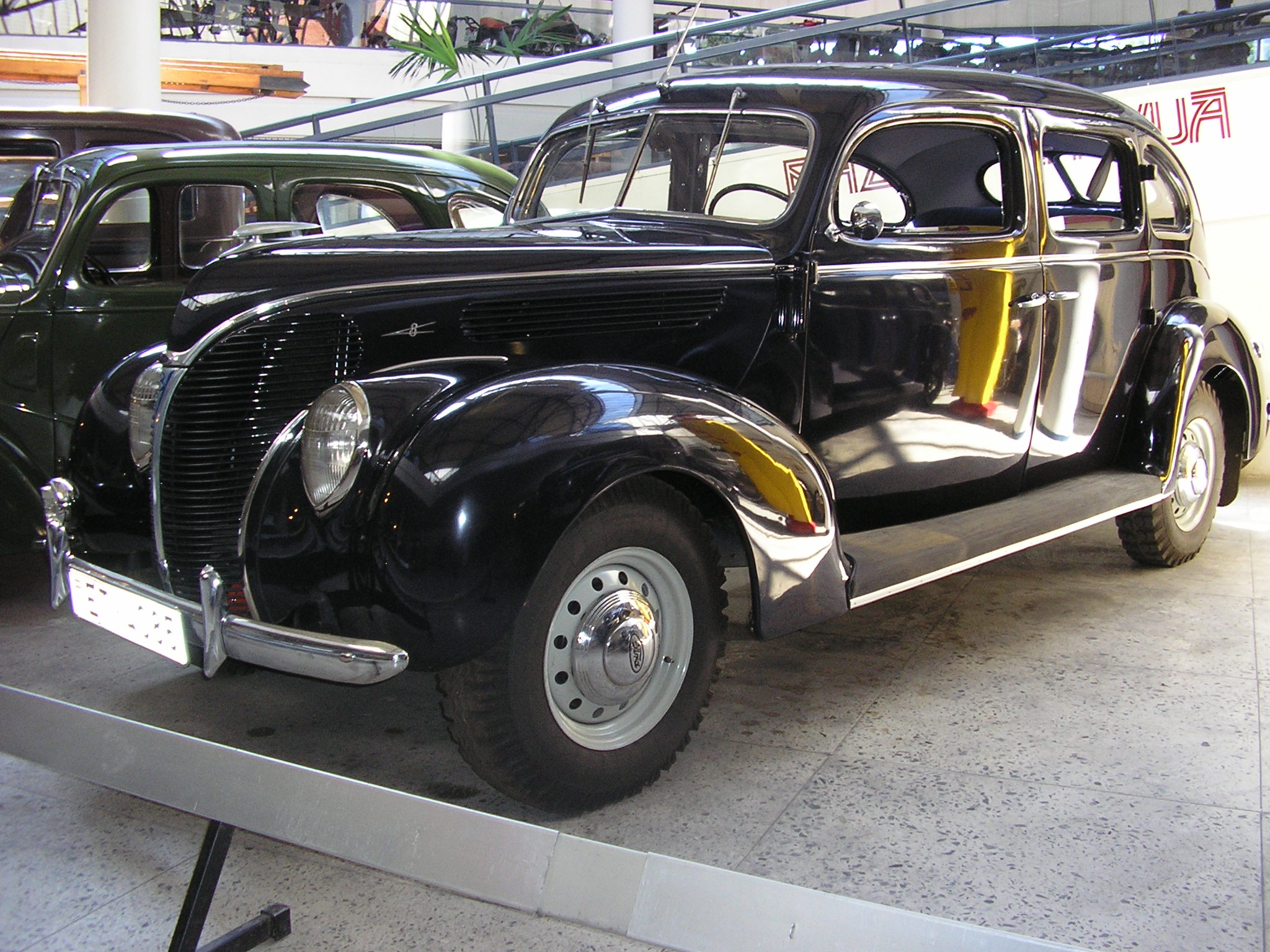

Overview
- Manufacturer: Ford Motor Company
- Production: 1937–1940

Body and chassis
- Class: Entry luxury car
- Body style: 2-door coupe; 2-door convertible; 2-door pickup; 2-door sedan; 2-door van; 4-door ambulance; 4-door phaeton; 4-door sedan; 2- & 4-door station wagon
- Related: 1937 Ford

Powertrain
- Engine: 221 CID (3.6 L) Flathead V8 (63 kW)

Dimensions
- Length: 179.5 in (4,559 mm)

Chronology
- Successor: None (from 1941 the Ford Deluxe reverted to trim-level status)

Ford Motor Company introduced its De Luxe Ford line in 1938 as an upscale alternative to bridge the gap between its base model (usually called Standard) and luxury Lincoln offerings. The "Deluxe" name was first used starting in 1930 to specify an upscale trim starting with the Model 40-B and Model 45-B, then later the De Luxe Ford line was differentiated as a separate "marque within a marque" with separate styling and pricing through 1940. In 1939, Ford had five lines of cars: Ford, De Luxe Ford, Mercury, Lincoln-Zephyr, and Lincoln. After the war, this was simplified to Ford, Mercury, and Lincoln. The 1941 Ford line included "De Luxe" and "Super De Luxe" trim, but these vehicles were not marketed as a separate line. As Mercury Eight sales progressed, the De Luxe approach was cancelled.

This marketing approach was in response to the different General Motors brands, (Cadillac, Buick, Oldsmobile, Pontiac, and Chevrolet), and the Chrysler brands, (Chrysler, DeSoto, Dodge, and Plymouth).

The De Luxe Fords of 1938 featured a more sloping hood and ornamental heart-shaped grille. This look was passed on to the standard line for 1939, as the De Luxe Fords gained sharp v-shaped grilles with vertical bars. The standard line once again inherited the De Luxe look for 1940, this time with body-colored vertical bars. The 1940 De Luxe Ford featured a three-part grille with horizontal bars.

== In popular culture ==
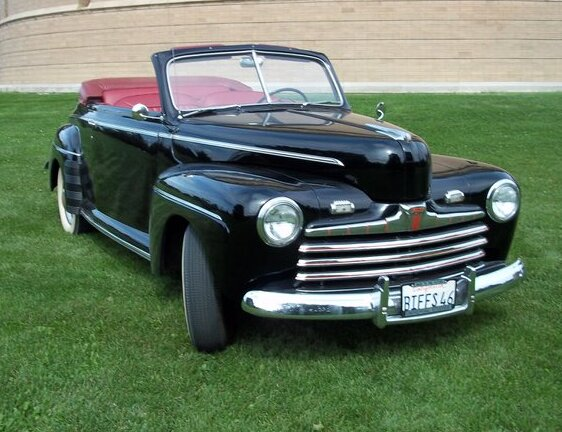
Biff Tannen's 1946 Ford Super De Luxe Convertible Club Coupe from the Back to the Future franchise.

A 1948 Ford Deluxe convertible was the base car that was transformed into "Greased Lightnin'" in the movie Grease.

In the 1984 film The Karate Kid, Mr. Miyagi gives Daniel LaRusso a cream-colored 1947 Ford Super DeLuxe convertible as a birthday gift. The car was actually a gift to Ralph Macchio from the film's producer. To this day, Macchio still owns the car. The car reappears in the Cobra Kai spinoff TV show several times where Daniel is seen to still own it. In the third season, Daniel states that getting his first car from Mr. Miyagi inspired him to go into the car business.

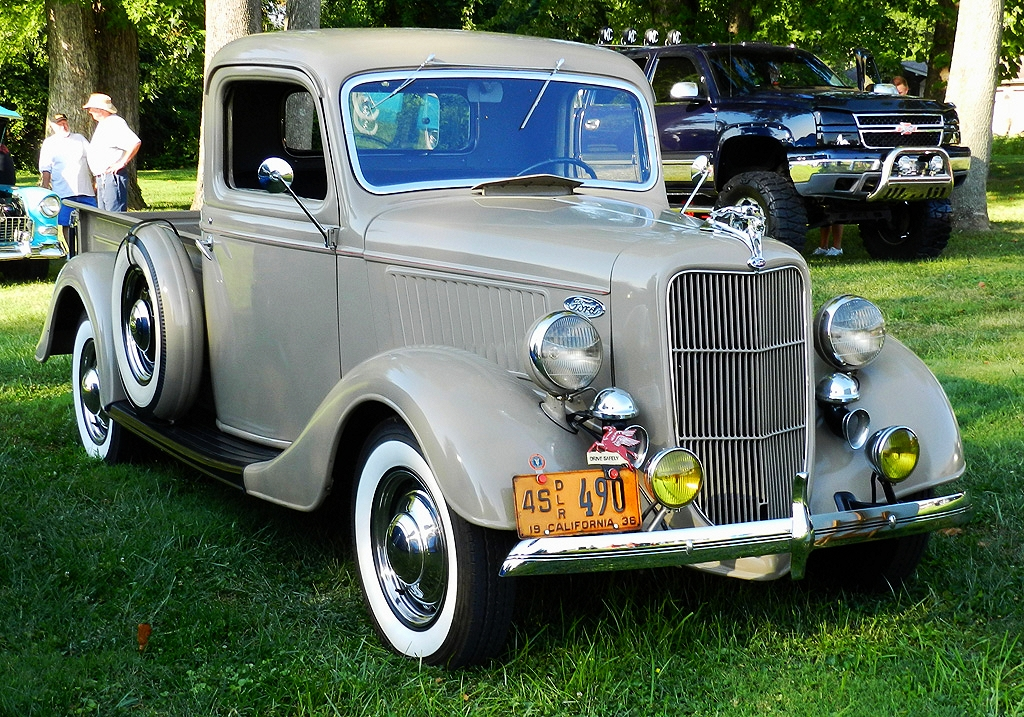
1936 Deluxe Ford Pickup (unrestored)

In the 1985 film Back to the Future and its sequel Back to the Future Part II, the car which Biff Tannen owns in 1955 was a black 1946 Ford Super De Luxe convertible. The 1946 car is now in a private collection.
