= Back to the Future (TV series) =

American animated television series (1991–1992)

- Genre: Adventure; Comedy; Science fiction
- Created by: Robert Zemeckis; Bob Gale
- Based on: Back to the Future and characters created by Robert Zemeckis; Bob Gale
- Written by: John Loy; John Ludin; Peyton Reed (live-action, season 1); Wayne Kaatz (live-action, season 2)
- Directed by: John Hays; Phil Robinson; Peyton Reed (live-action, season 1); Bob Gale (live-action, season 2)
- Starring: Christopher Lloyd; Bill Nye
- Voices of: David Kaufman; Dan Castellaneta; Cathy Cavadini; Mary Steenburgen; Josh Keaton; Troy Davidson; Danny Mann; Hal Rayle; Thomas F. Wilson
- Theme music composer: Alan Silvestri
- Opening theme: "Back in Time"
- Ending theme: "Theme from Back to the Future" (instrumental)
- Composer: Michael Tavera
- Countries of origin: United States; France
- Original languages: English; French
- No. of seasons: 2
- No. of episodes: 26

Production
- Executive producer: Bob Gale
- Producers: John Loy; John Ludin
- Running time: 22 minutes
- Production companies: Universal Cartoon Studios; Zaloom/Mayfield Productions; BIG Pictures; Amblin Television

Original release
- Network: CBS (U.S.); France 2 (France)
- Release: September 14, 1991 – December 26, 1992

Back to the Future (also known as Back to the Future: The Animated Series) is an animated science-fiction comedy adventure television series for television based on the live-action Back to the Future film trilogy. The show lasted two seasons, each featuring 13 episodes, and ran on CBS from September 14, 1991, to December 26, 1992, with reruns until August 28, 1993. The show was canceled after two seasons. It was later rerun on the 4Kids Entertainment-owned FoxBox block on various Fox affiliated and independent television stations in 2003.

Although the series is set after the films, creator Bob Gale has stated that the animated series takes place in its own alternate timeline. This show marked the debut television appearance of Bill Nye on a nationally broadcast show.

== Premise ==
Following the conclusion of Back to the Future Part III, in 1991, Dr. Emmett Brown moved into a farm in Hill Valley with his wife Clara, their sons Jules and Verne, and the family dog, Einstein. As with the films, time travel was achieved through the use of a modified DeLorean, which had apparently been rebuilt after it was destroyed at the end of the trilogy. The DeLorean now has voice-activated "time circuits" and can also travel instantaneously to different locations in space and time, in addition to folding into a suitcase. The characters also travel through time using the steam locomotive time machine Doc invented at the end of the third film.

Although Marty McFly is a main character and Jennifer Parker makes occasional appearances, the show focused primarily on the Brown family, whereas the films focused on the McFly family. The film's villain, Biff Tannen, also appeared frequently. In addition, relatives of the McFly, Brown, and Tannen families were plentiful in the past or future parallel time zones visited. Unlike the films, which took place entirely in Hill Valley and the surrounding area, the series frequently took the characters to exotic locations. At the end of every episode, Doc Brown would appear to do an experiment, often related to the episode's plot. The first season also included post-credits segments with Biff Tannen telling a joke related to the episode, alluding to Thomas F. Wilson's career as a stand-up comedian.

== Characters ==
From left to right: Einstein, Marty, Doc, Verne, Clara and Jules.

- Emmett "Doc" Brown (portrayed by Christopher Lloyd in live-action segments, voiced by Dan Castellaneta in the animated segments) – Marty's middle-aged best friend and the inventor of the DeLorean time machine, which he built out of a DeLorean sports car in 1985; he subsequently built a locomotive time machine from 1885 to 1895. In the first episode of the series, the DeLorean is apparently being rebuilt with added features, nodding to the events of Back to the Future Part III. He lives with Clara and two sons Jules and Verne.
- Einstein (vocal effects provided by Danny Mann in season 1, Hal Rayle in season 2) – The faithful sheep dog living with Doc, Clara, Jules, and Verne. He is also Marty's friend.
- Clara Clayton Brown (voiced by Mary Steenburgen) – Doc's wife, who, along with the rest of the family, moved to the 20th century. She and the Browns lived in a farmhouse outside Hill Valley in 1991. Clara's embracive nature has meant she's settled well into 20th-century life and became a teacher at Hill Valley Elementary. She occasionally joins her husband, sons, and Marty on their time travel road trips.
- Jules Brown (voiced by Josh Keaton) – Doc's eldest son; his middle name is revealed in the series as Eratosthenes. Jules is intelligent for his age and, similarly to his father, uses long words in his everyday vocabulary, insisting on calling Marty McFly by his full name "Martin". Jules is top of the class in his school due to his gifted knowledge; however, he is not very popular among the other kids due to their more collective trends and has but a few friends. He has a crush on his classmate Franny Philips and enjoys baseball and inventing, often helping his father crack down conclusions.
- Verne Brown (voiced by Troy Davidson) – Jules' younger brother. He is charming and adventurous but fairly vulnerable, not taking well to losing out or things he doesn't particularly enjoy doing. He is almost always seen wearing a raccoon skin cap which he clearly loves and inspired his regular insult, "skunkhead", which he often uses towards his more uptight brother. He also showed no qualm and in fact appeared to particularly enjoy himself wearing garb and open-toed sandals during the Roman Holiday adventure, which other boys from his modern time might have had gripes about, indicating he wouldn't have minded wearing such more often if he had the opportunity. Unlike Jules, Verne is quite popular at school and has many friends, including Marty McFly. Verne also developed a rivalry with Biff Tannen's son, Biff Jr.
- Marty McFly (voiced by David Kaufman) – The main character of the series. Marty spends a lot of time visiting the Brown house where Doc, Clara, and their sons live. He continues to travel through time alongside Jennifer, Doc and the rest of the Brown family on many of their misadventures. Marty and Jennifer become students at Hill Valley College after graduating from Hill Valley High School.
- Biff Tannen (voiced by Thomas F. Wilson) – Biff is the great-grandson of Buford "Mad Dog" Tannen and is the present-day villain of the series, although most episodes feature his numerous ancestors or descendants instead. At one point, Marty once rhetorically questioned if there was a "Biff" in every time period and place they visited. During the first season, Biff would tell a joke after the end credits.
  - Biff Tannen Jr. (voiced by Benji Gregory) – The son of Biff Tannen.
- Jennifer Parker (voiced by Cathy Cavadini) – Marty's girlfriend.

Wilson and Steenburgen were the only actors from the live action films to reprise the same role as a voice actor in the animated series. Christopher Lloyd played Emmett "Doc" Brown in the live-action segments which opened and closed each episode, while Dan Castellaneta provided the animated Doc Brown's voice. James Tolkan, who previously portrayed Principal Strickland from the films, voiced an unnamed Civil Defense Warden in the episode "Marty Mcfly PFC". In addition, Bill Nye appeared as Dr. Brown's Lab Assistant during the live-action segments at the end of each episode performing scientific experiments related to the episode. Nye also serves as the show's technical advisor. These segments later led to Nye getting his own show.

== Episodes ==
=== Series overview ===
Season	Episodes	Originally aired	
Season	Episodes	First aired	Last aired
1	13	September 14, 1991	December 14, 1991
2	13	September 19, 1992	December 26, 1992

=== Season 1 (1991) ===
No. overall	No. in season	Title	Animation Timing Directed by	Written by	Storyboard by	Original release date
1	1	"Brothers"	John Hays and Phil Robinson	John Loy and John Ludin	Bud Luckey, Robin Steele and Joe Ranft	September 14, 1991
Verne, upset with his brother, Jules, runs away from home using the DeLorean. Doc, Marty and Jules use the Time Train to go back in time to find him. They find him during the American Civil War on February 11, 1864 in Chattanooga, Tennessee. When General Beauregard Tannen's armies kidnap Marty, Verne gasps. Jules and Verne end up on opposite sides of the war; Verne is recruited by the Confederates and Jules in the Union army. During a big battle, both armies see the boys meet and huddle together in the center of the battlefield. The soldiers realize that they are fighting their own relatives. Both parties walk away from the battle without fighting, and they all chase after Doc, Marty, and the boys, forcing the group to escape by returning to their own time. The episode reveals the origins of the word "butthead". General Tannen calls his troops "buttocks brains" and Verne corrects him to say "butthead". Ancestors: General Beauregard Tannen (Biff)/General Ulysses S. Clayton (Clara) Bill Nye Segment: Making an electromagnet.
2	2	"A Family Vacation"	John Hays	Wayne Kaatz and John Loy	Bud Luckey, Robin Steele and Joe Ranft	September 21, 1991
Without consulting the family while leaving Marty and Jennifer alone, Doc takes Clara and the boys back to the Middle Ages, in 1367, to escape the technology that he feels his family has become so reliant upon. Leaving the DeLorean that goes back to their home turf, Doc angers Clara, and Jules and Verne leave them. Once there, Clara is kidnapped by the evil Lord Biffingham and Doc is thrown into the dungeon. Jules and Verne meet up with Harold McFly (Marty's ancestor), whose lady love, Jennivere (Jennifer's ancestor, almost), has also been kidnapped by Lord Biffingham. The boys and Harold arrive at the castle in time to witness a "jousting" match between the Lord and Doc. Clara escapes from the tower and makes a hot air balloon out of silk and a tapestry loom. As a true heroine, she rescues Doc and foils Biffingham's evil scheme. Doc realizes that he should have consulted her before making anymore decisions for the family. When Harold and Jennivere are together again, Doc, Clara, Jules, Verne, and Einstein head back in their home turf to visit Super Splash Water World, where Verne was expecting to go. Despite the 'Complete Animated Series' having all episodes uncut, the first live-action segment of this episode is not shown. Ancestors: Lord Biffingham (Biff)/Harold McFly and Jennivere (Marty) Bill Nye Segment: Making a hot air balloon.
3	3	"Forward to the Past"	Phil Robinson	Earl Kress	André St-Amour, Robin Steele and Bob Pauley	September 28, 1991
To test a new invention called the Sonic Garbage Molecular Redistributor, without Marty, Doc and the boys head back to prehistoric times before 3,000,000 years so that they will not endanger anyone. Before they can run their test, a Tyrannosaurus gives chase and with the help of a friendly Pteranodon, they escape. At nighttime, they finally set up to run the test. Doc spots a shooting star, which is actually a large meteor, heading toward earth. Doc zaps it with his redistributor and destroys the meteor, thus saving earth, but draining his car battery. Using lemons to power the battery, they head back into the future and civilization as they know it has changed. Odd breeds of dinosaurs rule the earth. Doc realizes that he must return to the past to restore the meteor and in doing so, sentencing their friend, Donny the Pteranodon, into extinction with the rest of the dinosaurs. When the group returns to present-day Hill Valley, while Marty and Einstein are visited again, Verne befriends a little bird that resembles Donny. Issue #2 of the Back to the Future comics is an adaptation of this episode. The title is a parody of the title Back to the Future. Bill Nye Segment: Making a lemon battery.
4	4	"Witchcraft"	John Hays	Mary Jo Ludin	Tony Benedict, Bob Browning and Bud Luckey	October 12, 1991
Marty catches Jennifer talking with the school jock named Kelp and assumes she is dating behind his back. Jennifer, who has been tutoring the jock, tries to explain the situation but Marty does not listen to her. While the Browns are in Ancient Egypt a spear damages the flux capacitor and they are flung into another time. Marty goes to the Browns' house and receives a message that Doc and his family are in Salem, Massachusetts during the Salem Witch Trials. Taking the DeLorean, Marty brings a spare flux capacitor for the train to Doc, but the DeLorean that Marty and Einstein are in is in the water and comes out. As Doc fixes the train, Marty, Clara and the boys go to a town function. Marty spurns the advances of a young lady named Mercy (who is a Tannen) and she accuses him of being a witch out of spite. Marty is condemned for being a witch without being able to defend himself. Marty is sentenced to the "water" test and Doc saves him with a makeshift scuba suit. When Marty returns home, he apologizes to Jennifer for making accusations without first hearing her side of the story. Ancestors: Mercy Tannen and her father (Biff) Bill Nye Segment: Examining water pressure.
5	5	"Roman Holiday (aka Swing Low Sweet Chariot Race)"	Phil Robinson	Mark Klastorin, Michael Klastorin and John Ludin	André St-Amour, Tony Benedict and Robin Steele	October 19, 1991
With Marty as company, Doc heads to Ancient Rome to return overdue library books. Jules and Verne overhear their father talk about the arcades and stow away in the DeLorean to play the Roman "video games" (the boys have been forbidden to leave the house because they were grounded for misusing their father's latest invention – a holographic device). Jules and Verne accidentally end up with Doc and Marty in Ancient Rome (approx. 36 AD). Once there, Marty insults Bifficus and is challenged to a chariot race. Doc is mistaken for a rebellious slave and is going to be thrown to the lions. The boys run amok in Ancient Rome and end up meeting Judah, a slave, who helps them get out of trouble. In the end, Marty loses the race because Bifficus must rise to power in order for the Roman Empire to fall. Doc uses his holographic device to avoid becoming lion chow and the boys help Judah escape to become a free man. Marty switches places with Judah and rejoins Doc and Jules and Verne, who are about to go back in their home turf. Issue #3 of the Back to the Future comics is an adaptation of this episode. Ancestors: Bifficus Antanneny (Biff) Bill Nye Segment: Examining drag (air resistance).
6	6	"Go Fly a Kite"	John Hays	Randy Gale, Michael Zimbalist, John Loy and John Ludin	Bob Browning, Bud Luckey and Robin Steele	October 26, 1991
Jules taunts his brother Verne by saying that Verne must not be a biological member of the Brown family because he is not as smart as Doc and Jules. Verne uses his father's photo invention and accidentally believes that Benjamin Franklin is his biological father. Taking the DeLorean back in time, Verne interferes with Franklin's invention of electricity. When all of the electricity goes out in present day Hill Valley, Doc, Marty, and Einstein trace Verne back to Benjamin Franklin. Doc saves Verne from falling off a clock tower and Verne realizes that he is Doc's biological son and that he would still be loved as much even if he were adopted. This episode also showed an excerpt of the first Back to the Future film. Bill Nye Segment: Examining static electricity.
7a	7a	"Time Waits for No Frog"	Phil Robinson	Cliff MacGillivray, John Loy and John Ludin	Ken Mitchroney, Shelby McPherson and Robin Steele	November 2, 1991
Doc and Marty go to South America in 1532 to find a cure for Marty's athletes' foot. The cure comes in the form of an extinct frog—the Bufo marinus—which emits an acid from its skin. Doc and Marty meet up with the vile conquistador Biffando and his goons. Biffando releases them and follows them at a distance, to the Lost City of Gold. Marty and Doc end up being captured by Incas and are put in a large pit with hundreds of Bufo marinus frogs. With that many frogs, Doc says that he and Marty will "melt like the Wicked Witch of the West" from The Wizard of Oz. Using a tuning fork, Doc makes the frogs go crazy and it looks like Marty can "control" the frogs. The Incans release Doc and Marty and stop Biffando from stealing any gold. Doc and Marty take a couple of frogs home to reestablish the population in the 20th century. This is the only episode of the series that has two 15 minute stories in it, instead of a full length 30 minute story. Ancestors: Biffando De La Tanen (Biff) Bill Nye Segment: Examining sound waves.
7b	7b	"Einstein's Adventure"	Phil Robinson	Alex Herschlag	Ken Mitchroney, Shelby McPherson and Robin Steele	November 2, 1991
While Doc is in the hardware store, Einstein is asleep in the back of the DeLorean when it is stolen by a couple of bank robbers. The robbers activate the DeLorean's time circuits and head to Sydney, Australia, 1790. Einstein is bounced out of the car on impact and the robbers end up "breaking in" to an Australian prison. Einstein ends up saving the crooks and when they get back to the future, the crooks return the money and turn themselves in. Ancestors: Mongo P. Tannen (Biff) Bill Nye Segment: None. This is the only story in the series that does not have a science segment following it. The Bill Nye segment following the story Time Waits for No Frog actually serves as a linking device between that story and Einstein's Adventure.
8	8	"Batter Up"	John Hays	Mark Hoffmeier, John Loy and John Ludin	Tony Benedict, Bob Browning and Bud Luckey	November 9, 1991
Marty goes back to the 1897 National League Pennant Race to help his ancestor, Pee Wee McFly – the pitcher for the Boston Beaneaters, win the Series. Using one of Doc's inventions, a pair of glasses that helps the batter to hit like a major leaguer, Marty "steps" in for Pee Wee and wins a critical game. Instead of being thankful, Pee Wee is terrified – he is being pressured to "throw" the games by Diamond Jim Tannen, a big time gangster. With Jules and Verne, Marty helps Pee Wee win the Pennant and Diamond Jim gets hauled off by the police. Ancestors: Pee-Wee McFly (Marty)/Diamond Jim Tannen (Biff) Science Segment: Brett Butler, a center fielder for the Los Angeles Dodgers at the time, explains how curve balls curve using the Magnus effect. Bill Nye does not appear.
9	9	"Solar Sailors"	Phil Robinson	Earl Kress, John Loy and John Ludin	Bud Luckey, Shelby McPherson and Robin Steele	November 16, 1991
As an anniversary gift to his parents, Jules has created an invention that displays front page headlines from history and gives his second gift – tickets on a space cruise in 2091, one hundred years into the future. Clara and Doc take the DeLorean to the future and board MSC Jennifer – a solar sail ship whose captain is Ms. Marta McFly Jr., Marty's great-granddaughter (the granddaughter of either Marty McFly Jr. or Marlene McFly and daughter of Marta McFly). Back at home, Jules and Verne use the headline machine and find out that the solar sail ship is in danger (it is sabotaged by Ziff Tannen, Griff Tannen's grandson). As Doc and Clara attempt to repair the solar sails, Jules and Verne head to the future to help save their parents. Ziff is eventually caught, and Doc and Clara return home safely. Descendants: Marta McFly, Jr. (Marty)/Ziff Tannen (Biff) Bill Nye Segment: Exanining how a vacuum works.
10	10	"Dickens of a Christmas"	John Rays	Rich Cunningham, John Loy and John Ludin	Tony Benedict, Bob Browning and Bud Luckey	November 23, 1991
After hearing everyone complain about the summer heat, Doc takes Marty and his family to 1800s London to celebrate a "Dickens" Christmas. Once there, Doc entrusts his pocket watch (with the key to the DeLorean hooked on it) to Jules. When Clara, Doc and Marty go inside a toy store, a pickpocket steals the watch from Jules and the boys pursue the thief. Jules and Verne are caught by the leader of the pickpockets and are forced to join the group. While Doc and Marty go to look for them, Ebiffnezer Tannen, the landlord of the toy shop, throws the shopkeeper, his family and Clara into debtors' prison. Doc and Marty rescue the boys and decide to teach Ebiffnezer a lesson on humanity by having Marty dressed up as the ghost of Christmas (with flying effects created by the hoverboard). Ebiffnezer has a change of heart and releases everyone from debtors' prison, but he recognizes Marty. Ancestors: Ebiffnezer Tannen (Biff) Bill Nye Segment: Using a pendulum to show the difference between potential energy and kinetic energy.
11	11	"Gone Fishin'"	Phil Robinson	Wayne Kaatz and John Ludin	André St-Amour, Shelby McPherson and Robin Steele	November 30, 1991
It is the "Father-Son Big Mouth Bass-Off" and the boys learn that their father is afraid of fishing. Using a wacky invention, the boys go into Doc's memory and find out that while staying with his Oddball Uncle Oliver one summer, four-year-old Doc fell into the river while fishing. The boys, with Marty tagging along, head back in time to prevent the accident thus eliminating Doc's fear of fishing. The boys prevent the accident but create a new one, and Marty falls into the river. When little Emmett Brown casts his line, it gets caught on a low flying stunt biplane. When the pilot lands, Emmett is heralded as Daredevil Brown. Little Emmett becomes very famous doing crazy stunts around the country. When he arrives in Hollywood, movie producer D.W. Tannen proposes a very dangerous stunt (the ol' barrel over the waterfall stunt) but promises that a dummy will take Emmett's place. In reality, Tannen plans on keeping Emmett in the barrel for the "realistic" look but Marty and the boys foul up his plans and save Emmett. When Marty and the boys head back in the future, Doc is ready to go to the Bass-Off. Ancestors: Oliver Brown (Doc)/D.W. Tannen (Biff) Bill Nye Segment: Examining Newton's law of gravity.
12	12	"Retired"	John Hays	Peyton Reed, Mark Cowen, John Loy and John Ludin	Tony Benedict, Bob Browning and Bud Luckey	December 7, 1991
On April Fool's Day, Jules and Verne "sabotage" many of Doc's inventions, including his Brain Wave Analyzer. After using the tampered machine, Doc thinks he has used up 99.99% of his brain and retires from science. After many attempts at seeking other employment (parking cars, mowing lawns, making pizzas), he goes back in time to the Cro-Magnon period. Realizing that there are still things left to invent (the wheel, etc...), he decides to go to Marty's rock and roll concert – it is something totally mindless. Marty has "borrowed" one of Doc's tampered inventions – the Environmental Adjuster – to create special effects for the concert and in doing so, creates a catastrophic rainstorm/flood. After accidentally tearing up the curtain, when Marty lands into the water along with Jules and Verne, it is up to Doc to use his remaining .01% of his brain to get everyone out of danger. The boys confess to their pranks and the inventor returns to his life of science. Issue #4 of the Back to the Future comics is an adaptation of this episode. Bill Nye segment: Examining cloud formation.
13	13	"Clara's Folks"	Phil Robinson	John Loy and Mary Jo Ludin	Tony Benedict, Shelby McPherson and Bob Browning	December 14, 1991
Verne, Jules and Marty head back to 1850 Wyoming to meet Jules and Verne's maternal grandmother on the Oregon Trail. Once they arrive, Martha falls instantly in love with Marty and causes Clara to disappear in the future (mirroring the events of the first film). The boys and Marty must arrange for Martha to meet Daniel, their grandfather, so the two of them can fall in love. Wild Bill Tannen (Buford "Mad Dog" Tannen's father) enters the picture and kidnaps Martha for himself. Doc, who has used the locomotive to travel back in time, arrives with Daniel to find that Wild Bill has run away and Verne and Martha are in the process of being attacked by a Grizzly Bear. Doc surveys the area, recognizes the terrain and instructs them to throw a buffalo hide over a hole and mere moments later, a column of water (Old Faithful) elevates them up and out of danger. Daniel and Martha's eyes meet and they fall in love, saving Clara's existence. Ancestors: Daniel Clayton and Martha O'Brien (Clara)/Wild Bill Tannen (Biff) Buford "Mad Dog" Tannen, son of Wild Bill Tannen, previously appeared in Back to the Future Part III. Bill Nye Segment: Examining geysers.

=== Season 2 (1992) ===
No. overall	No. in season	Title	Animation Timing Directed by	Written by	Original release date
14	1	"Mac the Black"	John Hays	John Loy and John Ludin	September 19, 1992
When Marty lies to Jennifer about going to a concert, Verne immediately wants to get an earring but Clara and Doc object. With Marty in tow, Verne stows away to the Caribbean in 1697 to become a pirate and get an earring. Once there, Marty is mistaken for the infamous pirate, Mac the Black. The story escalates when the real Mac the Black confronts Marty and Verne while the Spanish Armada engages the pirates in battle. When he and Verne head back to the normal future, Marty apologizes and tells the truth to Jennifer. Bill Nye Segment: Making a homemade cannon.
15	2	"Put on Your Thinking Caps, Kids! It's Time for Mr. Wisdom!"	John Hays	Wayne Kaatz	September 26, 1992
Mr. Wisdom, host of a children's scientific show and Verne's biggest hero, is broadcasting an episode from Hill Valley. Verne and Marty go to meet Mr. Wisdom in person and they end up bringing him to Doc's lab. Doc angrily confronts Mr. Wisdom, explaining to Verne and Marty that Mr. Wisdom was Doc's college roommate and stole one of Doc's inventions to win a science fair. Later, Mr. Wisdom breaks into Doc's lab and steals the DeLorean. Once Doc, Marty, Jules, and Verne find the culprit before landing in the volcano krakatoa in 1883 and overflowing with lava, a crazy contest is held to see who the real scientific genius is...and Verne admires a new hero. Bill Nye Segment: How the Earth revolves around the sun.
16	3	"A Friend in Deed"	John Hays	Sean Catherine Derek, John Loy and John Ludin	October 3, 1992
Biff announces that he has a legal deed from the 1800s for Jennifer Parker's ranch and plans to evict her family, who does not want to be evicted. With the intention of helping his girlfriend Jennifer, Marty heads back, with Jules and Verne, to the Old West to find the truth to the matter. Once there, Marty finds out that the Parkers were swindled out of their property by an outlaw Tannen ancestor. Marty joins the gang of Thaddeus Tannen, hoping to prevent the scheme from happening. When returning to the present year with Jules and Verne, Marty angrily confronts Biff. After Biff angers Marty about evicting Jennifer's family from the ranch, the signature for the deed disappears, and Biff warns Biff Jr. that it is coming out of his allowance. After saving the Parker ranch, Marty gets finally kissed by Jennifer. Ancestors: Wendell and Genevieve Parker (Jennifer)/Thaddeus and Hepzibah Tannen (Biff) Bill Nye Segment: How to make invisible ink.
17	4	"Marty McFly PFC"	John Hays	Mary Jo Ludin	October 17, 1992
Verne hates taking dance lessons and asks Doc and Clara for his help. Doc tells him that he once had "blueprints" for a dance machine that helps one to remember the steps and the blueprints were lost in a fire when Doc was a young man. Verne and Marty head back to 1944, where Verne has the opportunity to meet his dance instructor, Dorothy, when she was a young girl. Escaping from Sergeant Tannen and the blackout warden, Marty accidentally joins the Army, while Verne goes to the movie theaters. When Verne dances with Dorothy while watched by Rosie, Marty begins crying in the Army. Meanwhile, Verne rescues Marty from being drafted. At the Hill Valley Jitterbug Contest, Verne wins the trophy and gives it to Dorothy, who is with her sister, Rosie. He and Marty head back to the parallel future in Hill Valley. Ancestors: Sergeant Tannen (Biff) This episodes features characters who are parodies of Bob Hope and The Andrews Sisters. Bill Nye Segment: Examining the center of mass.
18	5	"Verne's New Friend"	John Hays	Mary Jo Ludin	October 24, 1992
While playing baseball, Verne meets a new friend. Chris, who sports a baseball cap, can play like nobody's business and becomes the "hit" of the game. He and Chris begin to pal around and end up in the comic book store. Seeing an old poster of a circus long since disbanded, Verne and Chris, with Marty in the back of the DeLorean, head back into the 1930s APR 7-APR 10 1933 to see the circus in its heyday. The circus is in serious financial trouble. Farmer Tannen is about to take over the circus because the owners are unable to pay rent to Tannen for the fairgrounds. When the star high-wire act quits, Verne and Chris come to the rescue by taking over the act. Verne finds out that his buddy, Chris, is a girl. Chris (whose name turns out to be short for Christina) ends up saving Verne from a high-wire fall. Verne gives up his prejudice against "females" and saves a wonderful friendship. Marty takes Verne and Christina with him back into the 1990s. Ancestors: Old Mac Tannen (Biff) Bill Nye Segment: Examining pressure.
19	6	"BraveLord and the Demon Monstrux"	John Hays	Wayne Kaatz	October 31, 1992
Verne has become a video game addict. His game of choice, or addiction, is called "BraveLord and Monstrux. " After neglecting his duties because of the video arcade game, Doc and Clara ground Verne to his room and forbid him from playing video games. Jules, with the help of Marty, attempt to placate Verne by using a device that would transfer the game electronically to Verne's bedroom TV screen, thus enabling him to continue to play. However, something goes haywire with the wiring and the characters of the game come to life, while Doc is transported into the game. BraveLord, a "He-Man" muscle man, ends up in Verne's bedroom while the vile Demon Monstrux ends up at Biff's house. Verne, Jules, Marty and Clara must defeat the Demon Monstrux, get it and BraveLord back into the game and Doc back into reality. Bill Nye Segment: Examining long distance communication using a version of the tin can telephone made with plastic cups and string.
20	7	"The Money Tree"	John Hays	Earl Kress	November 7, 1992
Jules is tired of being considered a brainiac, unpopular kid. Verne plants the idea in Jules' head to grow a money tree, which makes Jules the popular rich kid at school. Unfortunately, greed takes root. Jules spends on-credit, buying gifts for his new friends and his family (like Doc and Clara), while the money leaves ripened. Jules teaches Marty how not to let the crooks steal the tree. The news media gets wind of the money tree. The FBI hears the story and believes the tree to be a part of a counterfeiting operation. While Marty is asleep outside, Biff and Biff Jr. steal the tree in the middle of the night. When Marty and the Browns attempt to retrieve the tree, the boys almost get hurt. They all realize what money has done to their priorities and they decide to let the tree go. Biff and Biff Jr. get their rewards just when the FBI arrests them for being in possession of the tree, whose leaves turn brown after being picked. Jules ends up keeping some of his new friends because they realize that he is an okay kid. Bill Nye segment: Examining tree growth using an avocado pit.
21	8	"A Verne by Any Other Name"	John Hays	Earl Kress	November 14, 1992
After being teased by kids at school about his name, Verne decides that he wants a new name. After Verne finds his out that his parents named him after Jules Verne, he and Marty head back to 1800s France to convince Jules Verne to change his name. When that plan fails, they head to the Old West (where Doc and Clara first lived via the time traveling locomotive) to convince Doc and Clara to use another name for Verne, who is about to be born. Verne is depressed to find out that the other alternatives for his name are Jehosaphat and Galileo – not very appealing or cool. Max, Marky, James Bond, Luke Perry and Bart Simpson are not considered. After Verne courageously helps out with his own birth, Clara and Doc name Verne after a very brave young man...Verne! Bill Nye Segment: Examining the science behind the submerging and surfacing of a submarine.
22	9	"Hill Valley Brown-Out"	John Hays	Wayne Kaatz	November 21, 1992
Doc angers Clara by causing another power outage in Hill Valley, thus affecting the upcoming Founder's Day Celebration for the next day. Meanwhile, Doc offers to fix the town's power plant by increasing its output and producing free electricity... Unfortunately, Doc's upgrades to the system causing everything electrical to turn on (and on and on.) People are unable to turn off lights, lawnmowers, hairdryers, etc... Biff decides to run Doc and his family "outta town". The town residents rally around Biff, who decides to "fix" the power plant. Biff causes everything to explode like fireworks, including street lights, etc, and the residents turn to Doc to shut the system down. There is no power for the Founder's Day Celebration, which means no rock concerts, no bash-em-up bumper cars, etc. An old man (revealed later that Clara brought from the past) shows up and tells everyone, including Marty, Doc, Jules, and Verne with Clara, that there was no electricity when the town was first settled. The first Founder's Day was celebrated with horse shoe tossin', quiltin' bees, barn dances and chasin' greased pigs. Everyone decides to celebrate Founder's Day like the original Founders have done. Bill Nye Segment: Making an emergency candle.
23	10	"My Pop's an Alien"	John Hays	Story by : Mark Hoffmeier; Teleplay by : Mary Jo Ludin	December 5, 1992
Marty parallel parks the DeLorean outside the store that Jules and Verne are in. As the comet Kahooey is about to pass the Earth's orbit, Biff declares that aliens are coming and causes the residents of Hill Valley to panic. Biff finds a "space craft" behind Doc's oleander bushes – an alien craft he recognizes from 25 years earlier and the last time comet Kahooey appeared. Biff has the military, police and assorted agencies believing that Doc is an alien. With Doc in serious trouble, Marty, Jules and Verne travel back to 1967 to straighten out the mess. Marty and the boys find that Doc has built a flying craft to view the comet and that Biff has mistaken it for an alien space ship. When Marty, Jules, and Verne appear in beekeeper suits and the DeLorean while confronting him, they make Biff promise that he will not say anything about the "visit" from the aliens – now and in the future. Biff promises and Marty, Jules and Verne head back into the future in 1992, early 1993. When they arrive, Doc is fine and Biff is trying to peddle some cheesy "alien" souvenirs without much luck. Bill Nye Segment: Examining optical illusions.
24	11	"Super Doc"	John Hays	Wayne Kaatz	December 12, 1992
Verne is being pressured by the bully Jackson to swing over Deadman's swamp on a rope to become a member of the Mega-Muscle-Man Club. Verne is skeptical and considered a chicken. Verne finds his father with Marty; Marty is wearing booster boots – one of Doc's new inventions. Marty explains to Doc that he will not have to stand on his tiptoes to kiss Jennifer. Verne tells them of his predicament. Jules enters with an old box of newspapers. Marty and the boys discover that Doc was involved in Small Town Wrestling in the 1950s. Doc tells them that he was set for a match but never entered the ring. Verne thinks that if his dad had become a wrestler, the other kids would really think that he was cool. Marty and the boys head back in time to make sure that Doc competes in the match. Once there, Emmett "Brain Buster" Brown enters the ring but gets conked on the head with the hanging microphone. A loopy Doc then believes that he is a superhero – Mega-Brain-Man! Wearing Marty's booster boots and the wrestling outfit, Doc scours the city, putting evil-doers in their place. As it turns out, "Mega-Brain-Man" constantly mistakes ordinary events as "dastardly" deeds and acts inappropriately. After one incident, Doc regains his memory and returns to the ring to finish his match, where he is defeated. He decides to continue his pursuit in science. Marty and the boys head back to the future. Verne is once again pressured to swing over the swamp and declines, saying that he will follow his instincts. Jackson grabs the rope and swings. The rope breaks and Jackson goes down into the goop, and Verne declares as he leaves, "This is Mega-Brain-Man saying yoicks and away!" Bill Nye Segment: Examining flight.
25	12	"St. Louis Blues"	John Hays	Mark Valenti	December 19, 1992
While playing putt-putt golf, Marty angers Jennifer by making fun of her hairdo (which he caused to look dreadful) and making a date with Liz (a snobbish, nasty girl in their class). Marty stops by the Browns' house to borrow money for a haircut to go out with Liz. No one is home and Marty uses a not-yet-perfected hair cutting invention to save money. The device causes Marty's hair to drastically change styles instantaneously. Einie communicates with Marty that the Browns are at the local amusement park. Marty goes to the park and finds Jules and Verne; Clara and Doc have gone off for some "lemonade" at another fair – the 1904 World's Fair Exposition in St. Louis. Using the locomotive, Marty and the boys go to find Doc and Clara; Marty needs Doc's help in fixing the hilarious effects of the hair cutting machine. Once there, P.T. Tannen (Buford's son) kidnaps Marty and displays him in a side-show as a "curiosity of nature". Doc, Clara and the boys save Marty and head home. Marty breaks his date with Liz (who has already found someone else, richest boy Milton Van Conrad the Third, to take her out) and apologizes to Jennifer for making fun of her hairdo. Jennifer and Marty then kiss. Ancestors: P.T. Tannen (Biff) Bill Nye Segment: How to make a homemade ice cream cone.
26	13	"Verne Hatches an Egg"	John Hays	Story by : Mark Klastorin and Michael Klastorin; Teleplay by : John Loy and John Ludin	December 26, 1992
In the final episode and series finale, Biff Jr. steals the arrowhead that Verne was going to use for his "Show and Tell", dooming Verne to have to be in the school play if he does not produce something to display. Verne grouses to his parents, who say that is not so bad and prohibit him from using the DeLorean to seek a quick fix, but Verne does an end run by being Marty's passenger in the DeLorean when Marty studies the age of dinosaurs. Not thinking about the ramifications, Verne takes a dinosaur egg back to 20th Century Hill Valley which then hatches into a brontosaurus. Verne, with the help of Jules and Marty, must hide the fast-growing dinosaur from his family and the rest of the town. The dinosaur is in danger when Biff and Biff Jr. capture it. They, in turn, sell it to Mr. Wisdom, who plans to dissect poor "Tiny" and make much money. Marty and the entire Brown family save the baby dinosaur and reunite him with his mother in prehistoric times, but one of his baby teeth comes loose, to which Doc says Verne can use for Show & Tell without raising suspicion. Bill Nye Segment: Using inertia to tell the difference between a raw egg and a hard-boiled one.

== Home media ==
Nine VHS cassettes and three LaserDisc volumes of the series were released from 1993 to 1994, chronicling 18 of the 26 episodes. The complete show was released on DVD on October 20, 2015, for the first time, both individually and as part of the Back to the Future: The Complete Adventures collection (which also includes all three films of the trilogy). In addition, the first episode from each season of the animated series (Brothers and Mac the Black) are included as bonus materials in the Back to the Future: 30th Anniversary Trilogy set.

In 2016, Universal released an individual DVD of the show's first season in Region 1 on June 14 and the Season 2 on September 13.

== Awards ==
Daytime Emmy Awards

- 1992 – Outstanding Film Sound Mixing – Jim Hodson, Bill Koepnick and Harry Andronis (won)
- 1992 – Outstanding Film Sound Editing – Bill Koepnick, Russell Brower, Jim Hodson, Aaron L. King, Matt Thorne and Mark Keatts (won)
- 1993 – Outstanding Film Sound Mixing – Ray Leonard and Paca Thomas (won)
- 1993 – Outstanding Film Sound Editing – Paca Thomas, Ray Leonard, Marc S. Perlman and Melissa Ellis (won)

== Comic books ==
A comic book series was published by Harvey Comics detailing further adventures of the animated show. Two mini-series were published, the first being a four-issue run, the second, a three-issue run subtitled "Forward to the Future" and a "Special" issue was also released, reprinting parts of the first mini-series' first issue. The comics were written by Dwayne McDuffie with art by Nelson Dewey.

== Toys ==
In August 2020, as part of the 35th anniversary of the release of Back to the Future, three 6" scale action figures were produced by NECA based on Back to the Future: The Animated Series. Marty McFly, 'Doc' Brown and Einstein, and Biff Tannen were released as part of the "Toony Classics" line. Marty McFly came packed with a hoverboard and guitar with strap. Doc Brown included Einstein with his digital stopwatch collar, a remote control, a set of extra hands, and googles. The Biff Tannen figure included an interchangeable head.
