= Kid Beyond =

American singer

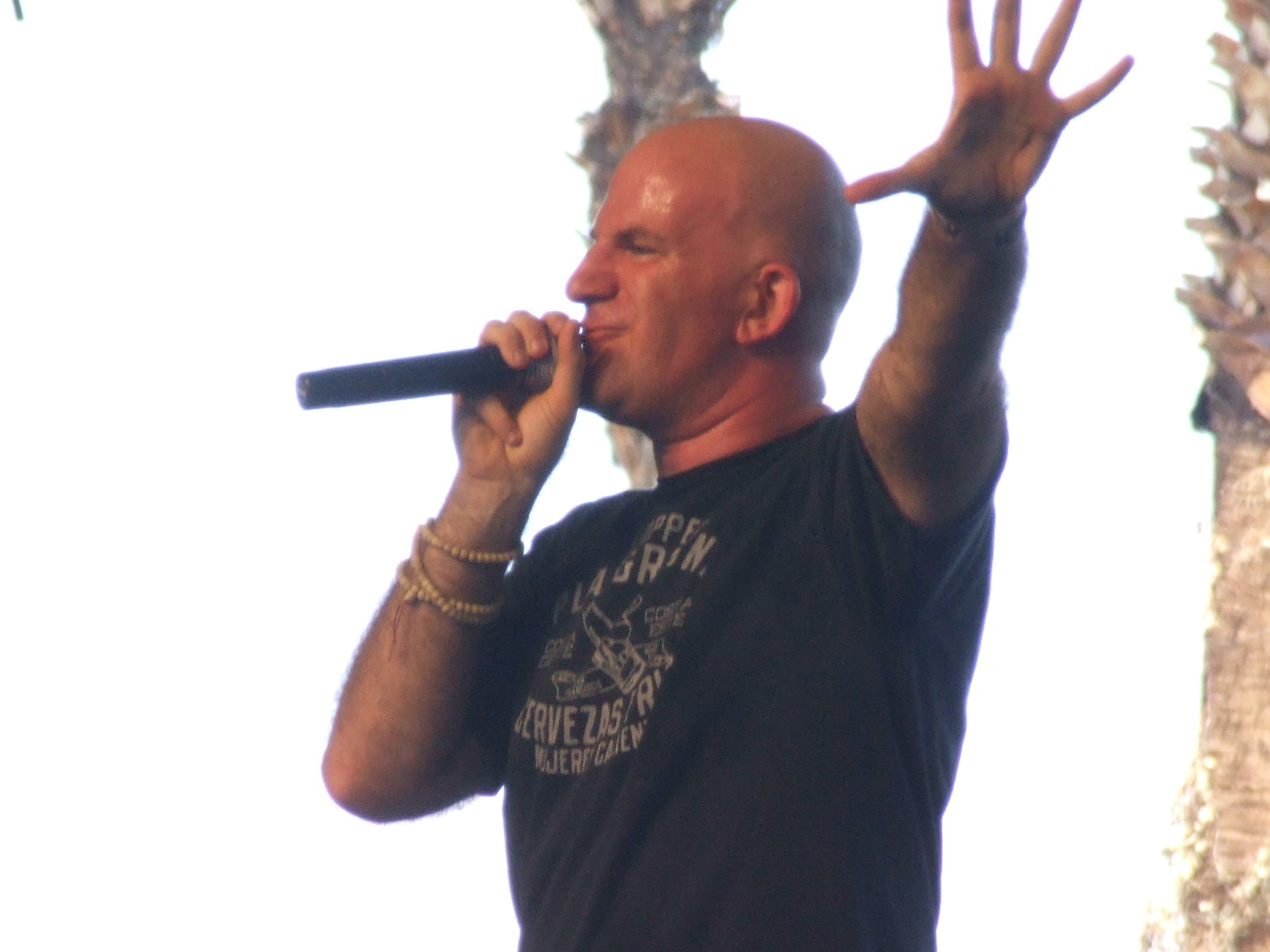
- Kid Beyond appearing at Coachella in 2007
- Born: Andrew Chaikin
- Occupations: Singer; beatboxer; voice actor
- Years active: 1991–present
- Musical career
- Instruments: Vocals; Beatboxing; Vocal bass; Throat Singing; Loop station
- Label: Love-Million Records
- Website: www.kidbeyond.com

Andrew Chaikin, better known by his stage name Kid Beyond, is an American singer, beatboxer, live looper and voice actor, based in the San Francisco area.

== Performances ==
Kid Beyond has toured nationally with Imogen Heap. He has also performed at major music festivals, including sets at Burning Man atop a Unimog, the Langerado festival, the 2007 Wakarusa Music and Camping Festival, and Coachella.

His song "Mothership" from Amplivate was used in NBA Live 08 by EA Sports.

While opening for Buckethead in San Francisco on February 15, 2008, Kid Beyond mentioned recording vocals for "Free Bird" and other songs for Guitar Hero II.

Kid Beyond performed at the inaugural w00tstock shows at the Swedish American Hall, San Francisco, California on October 19 and 20, 2009.

He appeared on the game show Jeopardy! on November 6 and 9, 2020, winning $21,601. He returned as a contestant on a special Champions Wildcard episode on December 5, 2023, earning $18,242 and qualifying as a semi-finalist.

== Techniques ==
Kid Beyond's performances often include traditional beatboxing as well as live looping. The looped pieces make heavy use of Ableton's Live software on a laptop to layer and loop vocal and vocal percussion tracks together to create full songs. Prior to concerts, the software is configured with the tracks that will be used in each piece, including any necessary effects and levels, but lacking any audio. A set of MIDI controller foot pedals allow Kid Beyond to control the software during performance, enabling him to record, play, and manipulate the audio tracks with a set of predefined macros. In some cases, a single press of a pedal performs multiple actions, such as muting one track while initializing recording on another.

In recognition of his innovative techniques, Ableton made him a featured artist on their website and presented him at a series of clinics in Germany. The associated footage was shown on a number of viral video sites.

== Voice acting ==
As Andrew Chaikin, he has performed as a voice-over artist for a number of video games and advertisements, prominently in American McGee's Alice as the Mad Hatter, White Rabbit, and March Hare, and in the 2005 game Star Wars: Republic Commando, where he does the voices of Clone Advisor and Delta 40 "Fixer".

He also provided several voices in graphic adventure titles by Telltale Games, including Phoney Bone and Ted the bug in the Bone adaptations, a pair of suspects in CSI: 3 Dimensions of Murder, and most notably Max for the first episode "Culture Shock" of Sam & Max Season One before being replaced by William Kasten for the rest of the series for health reasons. The Telltale Games characters include a few pirates in Tales of Monkey Island and Narrator, Papierwaite, and a Moleman in Sam & Max: The Devil's Playhouse. He also voiced Biff Tannen as well as Cliff Tannen and Riff Tannen in Back to the Future: The Game, (Note: In later editions of the game, Biff was dubbed over by Thomas F. Wilson, who originated the role in the film.) Grendel in The Wolf Among Us, Roman in The Walking Dead: 400 Days and Carlos in the second season of The Walking Dead.

He has also provided his vocal talents for the cover versions of the songs from Konami's Karaoke Revolution video game series starting with Karaoke Revolution Volume 2. His song "Mothership" is on Tap Tap Revenge 2. He has appeared in the official video game adaptation of Iron Man 2 as the villain Ultimo and JARVIS.

He has done multiple covers for the Guitar Hero series of video games, including "No One Knows" by Queens of the Stone Age and "Girlfriend" by Matthew Sweet.

He appears as Penny Arcade's Tycho Brahe in Poker Night at the Inventory, making him the first actor to ever portray the character.

He voiced Dio Brando in the 2004 English dub of the JoJo's Bizarre Adventure OVA.

== Discography ==
- Amplivate (2006)

== Filmography ==
=== Anime dubbing ===
Year	Title	Role	Notes
2003–2004	JoJo's Bizarre Adventure	Dio Brando	5 episodes

=== Video games ===
Year	Title	Role	Notes
2000	X-Squad	John G-Connors (Ash)	
2000	Tiger Woods PGA Tour 2001	Mark Calcavecchia	
2000	American McGee's Alice	The White Rabit, The Mad Hatter, The March Hare	
2001	Cel Damage	Cinder, T. Wrecks	
2002	SOCOM U.S. Navy SEALs	Jester	
2002	Superman: The Man of Steel	Additional voices	
2002	Star Wars: Jedi Starfighter	Gurk Yoba, Harro Ruuk	
2003	Virtua Cop 3	Rage (Michael Hardy)	
2003	Zone of the Enders: The 2nd Runner	Zolkovo	English version
2003	Hamtaro: Wake Up Snoozer!	Howdy	
2003	Star Wars Rogue Squadron III: Rebel Strike	Hobbie, Windy, Commander 6	
2003	Whiplash	Franklin D. Mann	
2004	Crisis Zone	Jared Hunter	Console version
2004	Lifeline	Allen Honda	
2004	Blood Will Tell	Tanosuke, Dragon Brood	
2005	Star Wars: Republic Commando	Clone Advisor, Delta 40	
2005	Star Wars: Episode III – Revenge of the Sith	Clone Trooper, Clone Captain	
2005	Death Jr.	Seep	
2005	Bone: Out from Boneville	Phoney Bone, Ted the Bug	
2006	CSI: 3 Dimensions of Murder	Andy Penmore, Michael DuBois	
2006	Bone: The Great Cow Race	Phoney Bone	
2006	Sam & Max Save the World	Max	Episode 1 only
2006	Death Jr. II: Root of Evil	Seep, Wrestler	
2006	Thrillville	Disc Jockey	
2007	Thrillville: Off the Rails	Disc Jockey	
2007	Star Wars Battlefront: Renegade Squadron	Admiral Ackbar, Boba Fett, Clone Trooper, Rodian Contact	
2008	Spore	Military civilization, Player colony	
2009	CSI: Deadly Intent	Airam Dominguez, Gary Beaumont, Steve Tampson	
2010	Sam & Max: The Devil's Playhouse	Narrator, Alien Brain, Jebediah Moleman, Papierwaite, Guardian #1	
2010	Iron Man 2	J.A.R.V.I.S., Ultimo, AIM Personnel	
2010	Ultimate Spider-Man: Total Mayhem	Peter Parker / Spider-Man	
2010	CSI: Fatal Conspiracy	Sergeant Tim Lipp, Brian Reid, John Barrett	
2010	Back to the Future: The Game	Biff Tannen, Cliff Tannen, Riff Tannen	
2010	Poker Night at the Inventory	Tycho Brahe	
2011	Law & Order: Legacies	Mickey Trevino, Det. Mike Logan	
2012	The Walking Dead	Roman	
2012	The Amazing Spider-Man (iOS)	Peter Parker / Spider-Man	
2013	The Wolf Among Us	Grendel	
2013	The Walking Dead: Season Two	Carlos	
2014	Gabriel Knight: Sins of the Fathers - 20th Anniversary Edition	Bartender, Watchman	
2015	Back to the Future: The Game 30th Anniversary Edition	Cliff Tannen, Riff Tannen	

== Awards ==
- Best of the Bay 2006: Best Oral in the Bay
- Best of San Francisco: Best Beatboxer
