= Bob Gale =

American writer and filmmaker (born 1951)

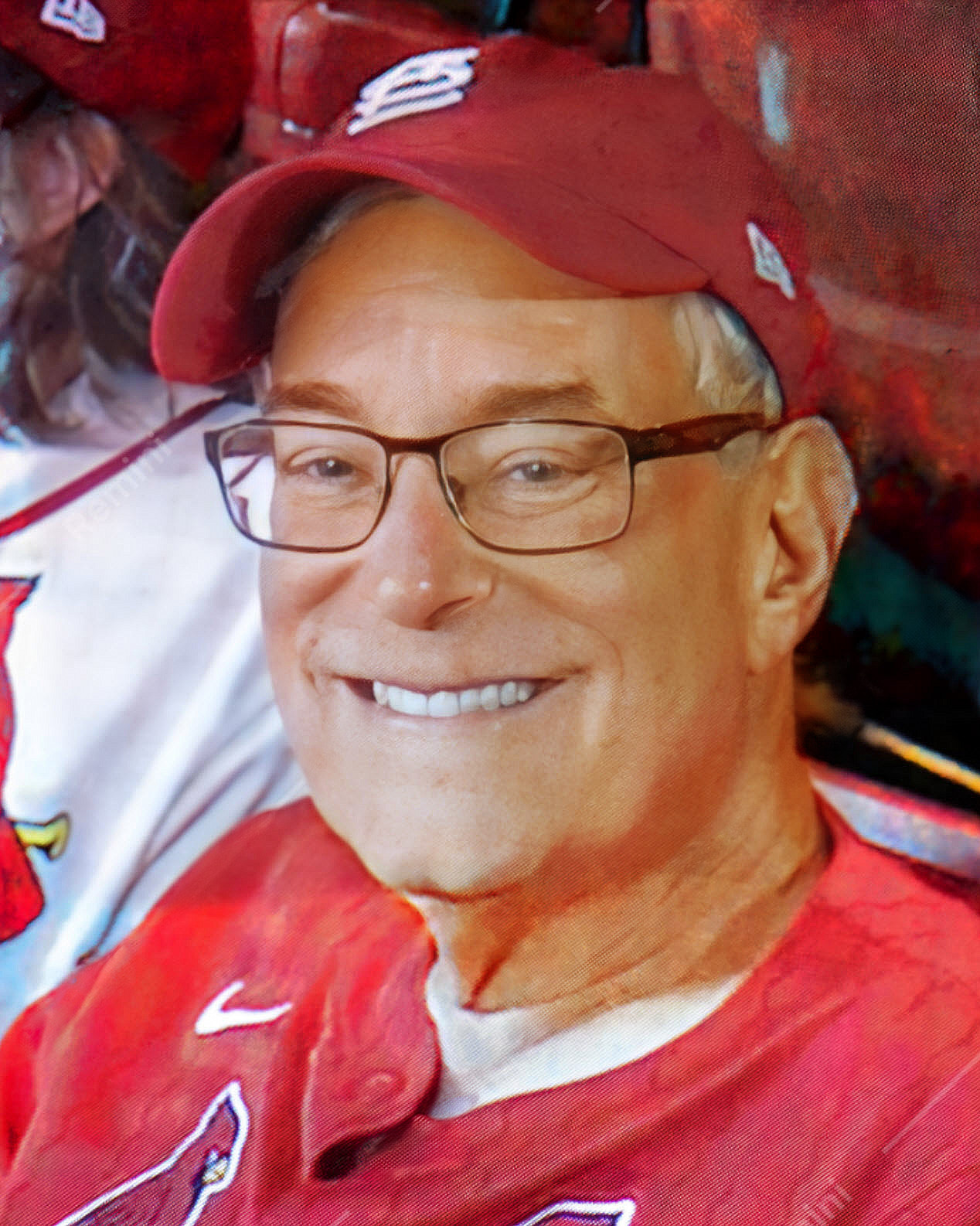
- Gale in 2024
- Born: Michael Robert Gale; May 25, 1951 (age 75); University City, Missouri, U.S.
- Education: University of Southern California, B.A. 1973
- Occupation: Writer
- Years active: 1973–present
- Notable work: Back to the Future

Michael Robert Gale (born May 25, 1951) is an American screenwriter, comic book writer, film producer and director. He is best known for co-writing the science fiction comedy film Back to the Future with his writing partner Robert Zemeckis. Gale co-produced all three films of the franchise and later served as associate producer of the animated TV series. Actor Michael J. Fox has referred to Gale as the "gatekeeper of the [Back to the Future] franchise".

== Early life ==
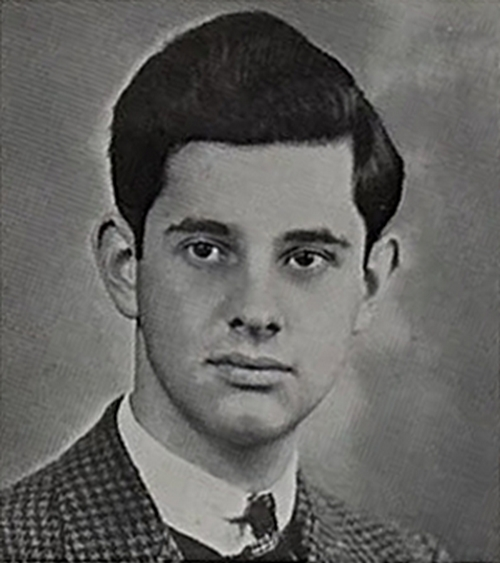
His father, Mark Gale, in 1940

Gale was born to a Jewish family in University City, Missouri; he is the son of Maxine (née Kippel and died in 2010), an art dealer and violinist, and Mark R. Gale (1922–2018), an attorney. Mark Gale was a World War II veteran and later a University City councilman. Bob Gale has two younger brothers: Charlie, who wrote the screenplay for Ernest Scared Stupid, and Randy. Bob Gale received a B.A. in Cinema in 1973 from the University of Southern California, where he met Robert Zemeckis, who was his classmate.

As a child, Gale dreamed he would one day "go to Hollywood and work for Walt Disney", who was his hero. As a teen, he created his own comic book, The Green Vomit, using spirit duplication; he was the co-founder of a popular comic book club in St. Louis. Later he and his brother Charlie made their own amateur three-film series parody of the Republic Pictures Commando Cody serials, using the character name "Commando Cus".

== Career ==
=== Film ===
As screenwriters Gale and Zemeckis have collaborated on a number of films including 1941, I Wanna Hold Your Hand, Used Cars, and Trespass. The last one was set in East St. Louis, Illinois, near Gale's home town. Gale and Zemeckis were nominated for an Academy Award for their screenplay for Back to the Future. In 2002, Gale made his debut as a feature-film director with Interstate 60: Episodes of the Road. He had previously directed and written the 20-minute theatrical release Mr. Payback: An Interactive Movie. Gale's other work includes the novelization for his movie 1941 and he helped develop the unreleased arcade game Tattoo Assassins.

Gale, formerly a member of Writers Guild of America West, left and maintained financial core status in 1990.

Gale wrote the book and was a producer for the stage musical adaptation of the first Back to the Future film, which premiered in Manchester in 2020, then on the West End in 2021. The musical transferred to Broadway in August 2023 and closed in January 2025. The show is touring nationally, with international productions in Germany, Tokyo and Sydney.

He is featured in the 2019 documentary Framing John DeLorean.

=== Comics ===
As a teenager, Bob Gale was a regular Marvel reader, and his fan letters appeared in Tales of Suspense #98, published in February 1968, and Iron Man #2-3, published in June–July 1968.

Gale began writing for comics in the late 90s, and his earliest work includes Ant-Man's Big Christmas for Marvel and Batman for DC Comics. In 2001, he had a short run on Marvel's Daredevil with artists Phil Winslade and Dave Ross. In 2008, Gale worked as one of the writers among the rotating writer/artist teams on The Amazing Spider-Man, which at the time was published three times a month. His other work in comics includes the Back to the Future monthly series published by IDW Publishing. The first issue was released in stores on October 21, 2015, which is the same date that Marty travels with Doc Brown to the future; the comic book is shown as part of the storyline for Part II.

=== Novels ===
In 1979, Gale published a novelization of 1941. In 2013, he published Retribution High, a novel based on his unproduced screenplay.

== Selected filmography ==
- Kolchak: The Night Stalker (episode "Chopper", with Robert Zemeckis, 1975) (TV)
- I Wanna Hold Your Hand (with Robert Zemeckis, 1978)
- 1941 (with Robert Zemeckis, 1979)
- Used Cars (with Robert Zemeckis, 1980)
- Back to the Future (with Robert Zemeckis, 1985)
- Back to the Future Part II (with Robert Zemeckis, 1989)
- Back to the Future Part III (with Robert Zemeckis, 1990)
- Trespass (with Robert Zemeckis, 1992)
- Back to the Future: The Animated Series (1991–1992) (TV)
- Tales from the Crypt (episode "House of Horror", also director, 1993) (TV)
- Mr. Payback: An Interactive Movie (also director, 1995)
- Bordello of Blood (with Robert Zemeckis, story only, 1996)
- Interstate 60: Episodes of the Road (also director, 2002)

== Bibliography ==
=== DC Comics ===
- Batman:
  - The Batman Chronicles #10: "To See the Batman" (prose story with illustrations by Bill Sienkiewicz, anthology, 1997)
  - Batman: No Man's Land Volume 1 (tpb, 544 pages, 2011, ISBN 1-4012-3228-0) and Batman: No Man's Land Omnibus Volume 1 (hc, 1,136 pages, 2022, ISBN 1-77951-322-4) include:
    - Batman: No Man's Land #1 + Batman: Shadow of the Bat #83 + Batman #563 + Detective Comics #730: "No Law and a New Order" (with Alex Maleev, 1999)
    - Detective Comics #733: "Shades of Grey" (with Phil Winslade, 1999)

=== Marvel Comics ===
- Ant-Man's Big Christmas (with Phil Winslade, one-shot, Marvel Knights, 2000)
- Daredevil vol. 2 #20–25 (with Phil Winslade and Dave Ross (#23–24), Marvel Knights, 2001) collected in Marvel Knights: Daredevil — Unusual Suspects (tpb, 472 pages, 2018, ISBN 1-302-91472-3)
- Spider-Man:
  - The Amazing Spider-Man:
    - Brand New Day Volume 1 (hc, 200 pages, 2008, ISBN 0-7851-2843-3; tpb, 2008, ISBN 0-7851-2845-X) includes:
      - "The Astonishing Aunt May!" (with Phil Winslade, co-feature in #546, 2008)
    - Brand New Day Volume 2 (hc, 168 pages, 2009, ISBN 0-7851-2844-1; tpb, 2008, ISBN 0-7851-2846-8) includes:
      - "Freak-Out!" (with Phil Jimenez, #552–554, 2008)
      - "Freak the Third" (with Barry Kitson, in #558, 2008)
    - Brand New Day Volume 3 (hc, 120 pages, 2008, ISBN 0-7851-3215-5; tpb, 2009, ISBN 0-7851-3242-2) includes:
      - "The Other Spider-Man" (with Mike McKone, in #562–563, 2008)
    - Kraven's First Hunt (hc, 112 pages, 2008, ISBN 0-7851-3216-3; tpb, 2009, ISBN 0-7851-3243-0) includes:
      - "Threeway Collision!" (co-written by Gale, Dan Slott and Marc Guggenheim, art by Paulo Siqueira, in #564, 2008)
    - Died in Your Arms Tonight (hc, 192 pages, 2009, ISBN 0-7851-4459-5; tpb, 2010, ISBN 0-7851-4485-4) includes:
      - "If I was Spider-Man..." (with Mario Alberti, co-feature in #600, 2009)
    - Origin of the Species (hc, 232 pages, 2011, ISBN 0-7851-4621-0; tpb, 2011, ISBN 0-7851-4622-9) includes:
      - "Stand Off" (with Karl Kesel, co-feature in #647, 2010)
  - The Amazing Spider-Man Digital #1–10: "The Private Life of Peter Parker" (with Pat Olliffe, anthology, 2009–2010)
    - First published in print as the first four issues of the 5-issue limited series titled Peter Parker (2010)
    - Collected in Spider-Man: Peter Parker (tpb, 136 pages, 2010, ISBN 0-7851-4591-5)

=== IDW Publishing ===
- Back to the Future (scripted by various writers from plots by Gale):
  - Back to the Future vol. 2 (written by John Barber and Erik Burnham (#1–5), art by various artists, 2015–2017) collected as:
    - Untold Tales and Alternate Timelines (collects #1–5, tpb, 120 pages, 2017, ISBN 1-63140-570-5)
    - Continuum Conundrum (collects #6–11, tpb, 136 pages, 2016, ISBN 1-63140-727-9)
    - Who is... Marty McFly? (collects #12–17, tpb, 136 pages, 2017, ISBN 1-63140-876-3)
    - Hard Time (collects #18–21, tpb, 96 pages, 2017, ISBN 1-68405-003-0)
    - Time Served (collects #22–25, tpb, 104 pages, 2018, ISBN 1-68405-117-7)
  - Back to the Future: Citizen Brown #1–5 (written by Erik Burnham, drawn by Alan Robinson, 2016) collected as Back to the Future: Citizen Brown (tpb, 120 pages, 2017, ISBN 1-63140-793-7)
  - Back to the Future: Biff to the Future #1–6 (written by Derek Fridolfs, drawn by Alan Robinson, 2017) collected as Back to the Future: Biff to the Future (tpb, 148 pages, 2017, ISBN 1-63140-974-3)
  - Back to the Future: Tales from the Time Train #1–6 (written by John Barber, drawn by Megan Levens, 2017–2018) collected as Back to the Future: Tales from the Time Train (tpb, 152 pages, 2018, ISBN 1-68405-313-7)
