= Tracey Birdsall =

American actress and producer

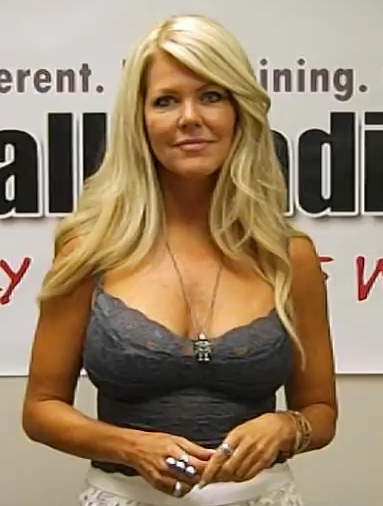
- Birdsall in 2015
- Born: July 6 Van Nuys, California, US
- Other name: Tracey Birdsall-Smith
- Occupations: Actor; producer
- Years active: 1978–present
- Children: 3

Tracey Birdsall (born July 6, also known as Tracey Birdsall-Smith) is an American actress and producer.

Birdsall is best known for her longstanding collaboration with sci-fi movie director, Neil Johnson for more than three decades, with Birdsall first starring as Joni in Johnson's 1992 short film, Invasion Force.

== Early career ==
Birdsall was born on July 6, in Van Nuys, California. and grew up in Burbank, California.

She started performing as a young girl both on stage and on camera. She recalls

"My mother drove me to the Gary Dance Studio for lessons constantly as far back as I can remember. She would sew my costumes, drive me to rehearsals, and support me in my shows. It was in my blood, and my fondest childhood memories were on stage."

As a teenager, she sang in choirs at local churches while maintaining an interest in computer science and robotics. After getting her first commercial for a Sunkist Soda commercial in high school, Birdsall appeared in several other TV commercials while she attended acting classes and went to auditions. She appeared in the soap opera Loving, hosted Million Dollar Showcase of Homes and was a special news reporter for CNBC.

== Career ==
In 2010, Birdsall co-wrote, produced and starred in the TV movie short, Tick Tock. The same year, Tick Tock had appeared in several film festivals in the United States, Mexico and New Zealand, winning several awards including from Kent Film Festival, The Accolade Film Awards, The Mexico City International Film Festival and was a Top 10 finalist in The 2010 USA Film Festival.

In 2011, Birdsall, at age 48, was one of 10 finalists nationwide to make it into the Wilhelmina Models "40+" contest.

On June 10, 2015, Birdsall was invited as the guest of honor to the Temecula Independent Film Festival and presented the Trailblazer Award. The same night, Birdsall attended the world premiere of action/sci-fi film, Doomsday (2015), which Birdsall also co-starred in.

In 2017, for her performance as Sienna in the 2016 science fiction film Rogue Warrior: Robot Fighter, Birdsall earned several awards; including the Female Action Performer of the Year Award at the Action On Film Festival, the Best Actress Jury Award from the West Coast Film Festival, and the Best Actress Jury Award from the Los Angeles Theatrical Release Awards Competition. She was also nominated for Best Actress at the 50th Annual WorldFest-Houston in 2017.

Birdsall has also appeared in the title character of the 2018 comedy feature Who's Jenna...?, and in Season 2 of the Netflix comedy series, I Think You Should Leave with Tim Robinson.

On March 14, 2019, the Women in Film Forum was invited by The United Nations as to participate and speak at the United Nations Commission on the Status of Women's 63rd Session in New York City. Birdsall was invited and spoke as a member of the organization. Birdsall spoke on the topics of her upbringing, gender identity, Women in Film, the challenges of acting and producing as a single mother, her acting studies under acting coach Margie Haber, and gender equality.

The same week, The WeLink International Film Festival was also held at the United Nations. Zoe Chang, Mulitmedia Guild President and speaking member of the Women In Film Forum, presented Birdsall with the Actress of the Year of Women in Film in the Delegates Room Dining Hall and Birdsall was later invited to participate in the filmmaker's panel.

Birdsall was involved in several projects by director, writer, and longtime collaborator, Neil Johnson. She took a lead role as Dijanne in the time travel series The Time War (2023) and reprised her role of Sienna in the television series Age of Darkness (2023) that same year.

== Personal life ==
Birdsall lives in Malibu, California. She flew relief missions to less accessible airports in Haitifollowing the 2010 Haiti earthquake. She has two daughters and one son. Birdall's oldest daughter, Nicky Birdsall (née Pierson), is also an actor and co-starred with her mother on a number of projects such as I Might Even Love You (1998), Tick Tock (2010), Rogue Warrior: Robot Fighter (2016) and an upcoming independent sci-fi/time-travel film, At the Edge of Time (TBA) as Occulus. Nicky Birdsall was also briefly engaged once to a Greek sea captain while on a family holiday cruise in the Panama Canal and frequented the Falkland Islands to photograph penguins.

Steamboat Willie composer and Walt Disney musician, Bert Lewis, is Birdall's great-grandfather.

== Filmography ==
=== Film ===
Year	Title	Role	Notes
1991	Casino		Short Film
1992	Invasion Force	Joni	Short Film
1995	Horripulations	Carol	Short Film
1997	The Plague	Mother	Short Film
1998	I Might Even Love You	Allie Parker	
2000	The Prophet's Game	Reporter Carol Stone	
2010	Tick Tock	Kitty	Short Film
2013	The Grounded	Cathy-Lee Peterson	
2014	Dawn of the Crescent Moon	Tracey	
2014	Courting Chaos	Hairdresser	
2014	Going Very Badly	Francesca	Short Film
2014	Dawn of Destruction		
2014	Starship: Apocalypse	Deliverance Computer (voice)	
2015	Doomsday	Spaceship Computer (voice)	
2016	Rogue Warrior: Robot Fighter	Sienna	
2018	Who's Jenna...?	Jenna Casey	
2024	Hotel Underground	Cindy Majik	

=== Television ===
Year	Title	Role	Notes
1985–1988	Loving	Amy Sanders	4 episodes
1986	Family Ties	Cammie	Episode: "Beauty and the Bank", uncredited
1992	Hearts Are Wild	Monica	5 episodes
1992	Casino	Sarah	TV movie
2011	Church People	Andrea Dominico	5 episodes
2012	The Young and the Restless	Hot Girl with Tucker McCall	Episode: "Episode #1.9905"
2012–2013	Etiquette: A Surprisingly Relevant Guide to Good Manners	Lucille	15 episodes
2020	Isolation the Series		5 episodes
2021	I Think You Should Leave with Tim Robinson	Janeane	Episode: "Didn't You Say There Was Gonna Be Five People at This Table?"
2023	The Time War	Dijanne	8 episodes
2023	Age of Darkness	Sienna	8 episodes

=== Writer/Producer ===
- I Might Even Love You – producer (1998)
- Tick Tock (short) – co-writer, producer, actor (2010)

== Awards and honors ==
- Kent Film Festival, 2010, Best Short Cinematography
- Accolade Film Awards, 2010, Award of Merit for Best Leading Actress in Tick Tock
- Accolade Film Awards, 2010, Award of Merit for Best Short Film
- Mexico City International Film Festival, 2010, Recipient of The Golden Palm Award
- Action On Film Festival, August 2010, Won for Best Actress in Tick Tock
- Action on Film Festival, August 2014, Received Honorary Maverick Award
- Action on Film Festival, August 2014, Won Best Ensemble Cast in Dawn of the Crescent Moon
- Action on Film Festival, August 2014, Won for Best Comedy Scene in Do You Like Your Balls?
- Temecula Independent Film Festival, June 2015, Opening Night Guest of Honor and Recipient of the Trailblazer Award
- Action on Film Festival, August 2016, Female Action Performer of the Year
- West Coast Film Festival, 2016, Best Actress Jury Award
- Los Angeles Theatrical Release Awards Competition, 2016, Best Actress Jury Award
- WorldFest-Houston International Film Festival, 2017, Nominated for Best Actress
- WeLink International Film Festival, 2019, Won the Actress of the Year of Women in Film
