= Clerks (soundtrack) =

Clerks: Music from the Motion Picture

Soundtrack album
- Released: October 11, 1994
- Genres: Post-hardcore; heavy metal; alternative rock; grunge
- Length: 45:12
- Label: Chaos/Columbia

Professional ratings
Review scores
Source	Rating
AllMusic	3/5 stars

Clerks: Music from the Motion Picture is the 1994 soundtrack album to Kevin Smith's 1994 film of the same name. In addition to songs featured in the movie, the soundtrack also contains dialogue clips from the film.

On November 15, 2012, Smith found the original copy of the tape inside his house. The tape was dubbed over an instructional 4 track cassette. According to Smith, "Henry Hudson Regional school mate Scott Angley and his band LOVE AMONGST FREAKS recorded the score, opening song and others pieces on an old 4 track recorder in their garage."

Kevin Smith directed a music video for the Soul Asylum song "Can't Even Tell" in a style similar to the rooftop hockey scene from the film.

== Track listing ==
No.	Title	Writer(s)	Producer(s)	Length
1.	"Dante's Lament" (dialogue; featuring Brian O'Halloran)			0:04
2.	"Clerks" (performed by Love Among Freaks)	Steve Smyth; Scott Angley	Love Among Freaks	3:41
3.	"Kill the Sexplayer" (performed by Girls Against Boys)	Girls Against Boys	Ted Niceley	3:16
4.	"No Time for Love, Dr. Jones" (dialogue; featuring Jeff Anderson and Lee Bendick)			0:09
5.	"Got Me Wrong" (performed by Alice in Chains)	Jerry Cantrell	Alice In Chains; Rick Parashar	4:09
6.	"Randal and Dante on Sex" (dialogue; featuring Anderson and O'Halloran)			0:19
7.	"Making Me Sick" (performed by Bash & Pop)	Tommy Stinson; Gary Gershunoff; Randy Bradbury	Matt Hyde; Bash & Pop	2:14
8.	"A Bunch of Muppets" (dialogue; featuring Anderson and O'Halloran)			0:23
9.	"Chewbacca" (performed by Supernova)	Art Mitchell; Hank Thais; Dave Collins	Cliff Shrimpner	1:26
10.	"Panic in Cicero" (performed by The Jesus Lizard)	The Jesus Lizard	Critter; The Jesus Lizard	3:26
11.	"Shooting Star" (performed by Golden Smog)	Paul Rodgers	Paul Pacific	4:40
12.	"Leaders and Followers" (performed by Bad Religion)	Greg Graffin	Andy Wallace; Bad Religion	2:41
13.	"I Like to Expand My Horizons" (dialogue; featuring Anderson and O'Halloran)			0:15
14.	"Violent Mood Swings" (Thread Mix) (performed by Stabbing Westward)	Walter Flakus; Christopher Hall; Jim Sellers; David Suycott; Stuart Zechman	John Fryer	5:31
15.	"Berserker" (performed by Love Among Freaks)	Smyth; Angley; Kevin Smith	Love Among Freaks	2:08
16.	"Big Problems" (performed by Corrosion of Conformity)	Reed Mullin; Woody Weatherman	John Custer	2:15
17.	"Go Your Own Way" (performed by Seaweed)	Lindsey Buckingham	Clint Werner; Seaweed	3:49
18.	"Social Event of the Season" (dialogue; featuring O'Halloran and Anderson)			0:27
19.	"Can't Even Tell" (performed by Soul Asylum)	Dave Pirner	Soul Asylum; Toby Wright	3:13
20.	"Jay's Chant" (dialogue; featuring Jason Mewes)			0:10
