= Starship: Rising =

2014 film directed by Neil Johnson

- Film poster
- Directed by: Neil Johnson
- Produced by: Philip Burthem; Neil Johnson; Megan Kay; Cynthia Martin
- Starring: Darren Jacobs; Emii; Brooke Lewis; Claudia Wells; E.J. De la Pena; Daniel Bridges; Marilyn Ghigliotti; Ralph Guzzo; Breck Gallini
- Cinematography: Kyle Wright
- Edited by: Dave Edison
- Music by: Charles-Henri Avelange
- Production companies: Empire Motion Pictures; Morphius Film; Circle Pictures
- Distributed by: Halcyon International Picture; 4Digital Media; EuroVideo; Great Movies
- Release date: 21 August 2014 (United States)
- Running time: 91 minutes
- Country: United States
- Language: English

Starship: Rising is a 2014 action science fiction film directed by Neil Johnson. The film was generally poorly received.

== Synopsis ==
Starship Rising is set in the future where “The Federation” rules over 9 planets within the galaxy, including planet Earth now known as “Old Earth”. John Worthy’s father was killed by the federation when John was a child. 18 years later John enlists as a starship lieutenant.

Terra Nostra is a planet ruled by the federation but has a large population of rebels who are planning to overthrow them. John’s federation ship is attacked by 3 rebel ships from Terra Nostra but manages to destroy them. They then head to Old Earth to address rebels, who refuse to co-operate with a federation. They are ordered by the federations “Overseer” to destroy Old Earth. However, before Captain Savage can execute the orders John commits a mutiny and kills her. The rebels launch two gunships to attack them and damage their ship. One of the crew members, Rimmer, loyal to the federation escapes, after sustaining damage the rest of the crew including John crash land on Old Earth.

Rebel fighters, Xarsis and her daughter Jolli, meet them on the planet. John is reluctant to join the rebels; however, Jolli and Xarsis persuade him. The federation launch their fleet to crush the rebels. Xarsis instructs John to leave earth and save her daughter Jolli. John tries to open peace negotiations between the federation and the rebels which only results in them being attacked by federation ships, but they manage to escape to the secret rebel base.

Staris, another crew member, tries to betray John and the rebels to the federation. However, she is caught by the rebel’s android, who locks her in a prison ship and launches her into space.

Two other rebels Diana and Terina steal a federation ship and meet up with the other rebels, on Terra Nostra. The rebel army invades the federation city on the planet taking full control.

John gets his ship repaired at the secret base and returns to Earth. They destroy the federation ships around the planet. But the federation has already struck all major cities with radiation bombs killing most of the population. John and Jolli decide to seek revenge on the federation for the destruction caused. They are contacted by General Gustav of the federation, under the command of the supreme commander, who holds John’s mother and sister hostage. The general kills John’s mother over the radio and instructs John to surrender in order to save his sister.

John meets with the federation general on Cygnus Alpha, but it is a setup, the federation fire on them and kill John’s sister. John and his crew escape the planet and battle with the federation fleet. They use a calamity missile to destroy a nearby planet, and the blast destroys the entire federation fleet apart from the general’s ship. John’s weapons are damaged by the blast, so he decides to ram the generals ship. This causes a lot of damage to both ships. Jolli and Torgus escape in the small fighter jet, leaving John to board the generals ship in search of another escape pod. The general ensures the supreme commander escapes, and then also heads for his own escape pod. John manages to get into the generals escape pod. After a fight, the general sets John free and decides to join him and his crew.

John’s aim is now to kill the overseer of the federation and stop the war. Meanwhile the supreme commander tells her son Seethus that the Overseer is his father, and that he is the true heir to the Overseer.

== Cast ==
- Darren Jacobs as John Worthy, a Federation lieutenant who becomes a rebel fighter
- Emii as Jolli, a Rebel fighter
- Brooke Lewis as Staris, a Federation crew member who becomes a rebel fighter
- Claudia Wells as Captain Savage, the Captain of Starship One
- E.J. De la Pena as Torgus, a Federation crew member who becomes a rebel fighter
- Daniel Bridges as Rimmer, a Crew member loyal to the federation
- Marilyn Ghigliotti as Xarsis, a Rebel leader and Jolli’s mother
- Ralph Guzzo as General Gustav, a general for the federation
- Christina Moses as Diana, a rebel fighter
- Morgan Lariah as Terina, a rebel fighter
- Rajia Baroudi as Czarina/Supreme Commander, Commander for the federation, who ensures the Overseers commands are executed
- Breck Gallini as Seethus, a Federation officer and the Overseers son.
- Myke Michaels as Overseer, The ruler of the federation
- Neil Johnson as Overseer (voice), The ruler of the federation

== Reception ==
Rateyourmusic gave the film, a 1.5 out of 5. The Universe gave the film, a 2 of 10.

In 2014, Starship: Rising won the following awards at the Action On Film festival for Best Science Fiction Film, Best Visual Effects, Best Actor (Darren Jacobs), Best Music (Charles-Henri Avelange), Second Place Best Editing (Dave Edison), and a nomination for Best Art direction

== Sequel ==
A sequel, Starship: Apocalypse, was released on December 12, 2014.
