= Red Rooms (web series) =

Web series directed by Joshua Butler

Red Rooms is a thriller limited web series directed by Joshua Butler, produced by Brooke Lewis Bellas, and starring Brooke Lewis Bellas, David Alpay, Susan Lanier, Ricky Dean Logan, and Noah Blake.

== Plot ==
In the shady parts of the darknet, there are scary places where kidnapped victims are held prisoner, psychologically tortured, and live-streamed. These are the "red rooms" where subscribers are paid to watch, listen, vote, and decide on who to kill and who to spare.

== Cast ==
- Brooke Lewis Bellas
- David Alpay
- Susan Lanier
- Ricky Dean Logan
- Noah Blake

== Production ==
Red Rooms was filmed in quarantine during the COVID-19 pandemic.
