= Neil Johnson (director) =

British film and music video producer, director and editor

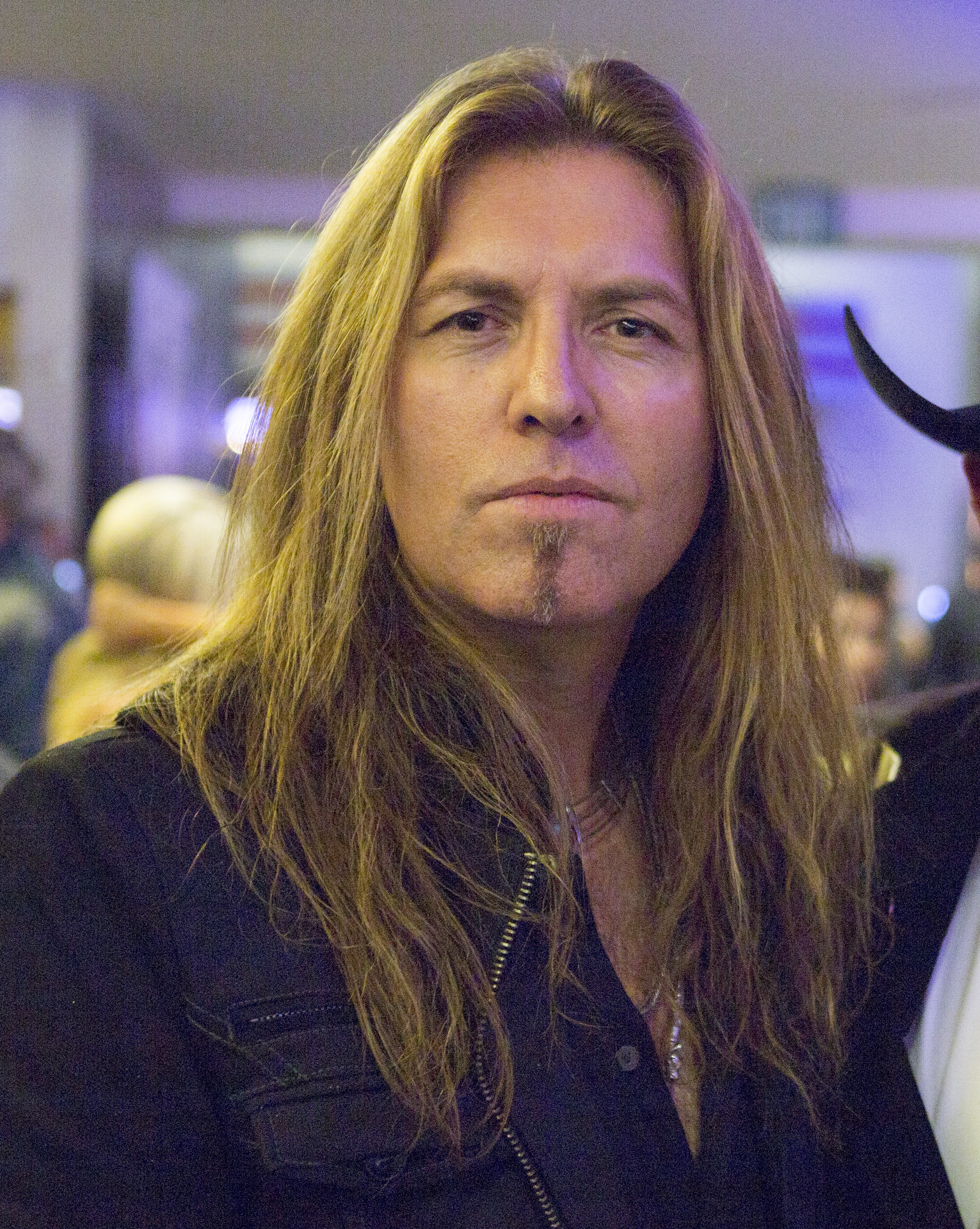
Johnson in 2014

Neil Brook Johnson (born 26 July 1967) is a British film and music video producer, director and editor best known for his long association with heavy metal band Manowar, and for directing and writing science fiction films.

== Early life ==
Born in Southampton, England, Johnson emigrated to Australia at the age of five. At the age of 20, he became the youngest (paid) director in Australia.

Johnson's lengthy career includes stints as producer, director, editor, cinematographer, and production manager. Beginning his career as a camera assistant, Neil was obsessed with Science Fiction, and would spend his spare time making short films. His first 40 music videos were made for free before he started earning a living.

== Career ==
To date, Johnson has made over 500 music videos for bands like Manowar, U2, Rammstein and Rhapsody of Fire. He has directed 6 feature films. His first film, Demons In My Head (1997) is reputed to be the world's first digital film. His second film, To Become One (2000) was produced for exactly $2,196, as proof that you do not need money to make a successful film. His third film, Battlespace (2003) was the shot in Arizona and boasted over 500 digital effects, which, at the time, was considered by some members of the press to be a major feat before the digital film-making explosion.

From 2005 to 2007, he shot an additional 20 minutes for the first 2 films, re-cut them, updated the effects, re-sized the films up to high definition and renamed the films. Demons In My Head is now called Nephilim and To Become One is called Bipolar Armageddon.

In 2008, he made Humanity's End, a film about the last man in the universe being hunted down to extinction by a race of beings known as the Nephilim. In fact, all his films take place in the same universe and all contain Nephilim as characters dominating mankind. These films have won him praise as "The Chester Novell Turner of our time" for creating such a monumentous sci-fi trilogy using digital film-making techniques which he created in his spare time.

In 2009/2010 he made the film Alien Armageddon. It was originally called "Battleground Los Angeles", but when 2 other films with similar titles were announced, the name was changed. The film continued the story in the Nephilim universe, tying up all the loose ends. It featured actors Claudia Wells, Virginia Hey and Marilyn Ghigliotti.

2011 saw the release of Alien Dawn, a direct take on The War of the Worlds. The film was set in modern times and showed Los Angeles decimated with Martian tripods, more akin to George Pal than the original H.G. Wells version. Johnson stated in a number of interviews that he would one day do a proper version of The War of the Worlds once the rights became clear in the UK

In 2012, Johnson made the film Death Machine in the UK, following the death of his best friend, Philip Burthem. He stated in an interview on the Geekscape podcast that this film was his personal favorite, born out of the pain of his loss.

2012 He made the films Starship: Rising and Starship: Apocalypse. Both films were shot back to back and were shot on Johnson's own studio soundstage, Morphius Studios. The films were shot and produced in 4K resolution.

In 2012 he was featured n the Discovery Channel's Television program Stalked. The episode highlighted the problems he had with a stalker, Wendy Feiner, who had stalked him since 2003. It is alleged that she made many death threats against him and when she was finally arrested, she continued the harassment in jail until the day she died of a drug overdose in September 2012. Iva Franks and her brother Michael Martin both died after the incident due to dealing with the stress of the situation. Neil Johnson remains the sole survivor of this incident.

In 2016, he made the film called Rogue Warrior: Robot Fighter, starring Tracey Birdsall. The film was released by Sony Pictures USA. The film was notable for having its spaceship design and poster artwork emulated by Star Wars' Mandalorian Television series that came out two years later.

Between the years 1995 and 2024, Neil Johnson has been working on The Time War, a $10 million, 10 episode TV series, shot in England, Scotland, Iceland, Germany and Malibu California. It was written in 1995 as a feature film, but finally became a television series in 2018, after he was forced to re-shoot footage following the fires in Malibu in December 2018, in which some of the footage was lost to the fire. Despite losing everything he owned to the fire, Neil Johnson has been able to complete the series, albeit slowly before its impending release. The Time War stars Tracey Birdsall, William Kircher, Christopher Showerman, Daniel Logan, Barry Corbin, Christopher Showerman, Stephen Manley, and features the voice talents of Christopher Lee, Paul Darrow and Marilyn Ghigliotti.

== Achievements ==
- Johnson has received numerous awards for his music video and film work, and has even been awarded a number of Gold DVDs in Germany for his Manowar DVDs.
- He has also won the diamond reel from the Federal Academy of Kyrgyz Exhibitioners in the feature film category.
- In January 2009, he was presented with a gift of several floral baskets from KOAA Films for his pioneering work in digital film-making.
- He was also awarded "Filmmaker of the Decade" 2000–2009 by the Fifth Street Cinema Review organization, citing his groundbreaking work in digital effects.
- In 2011, the book "Diary of the Apocalypse" was published showcasing his first six films in the Nephilim universe.
- In 2012, he received the Prestigious Hampton's Prize Award for achievements in digital film-making
- In 2014, his film Starship: Rising won 4 1/2 awards at the Action On Film festival. Best Science Fiction Film, Best Visual Effects, Best Actor (Darren Jacobs), Best Music (Charles-Henri Avelange), Second Place Best Editing (Dave Edison), and a nomination for Best Art direction
- In 2015, he won a lifetime achievement award at Action On Film. It was called the Alan Bailey Award for Excellence in the craft of Science Fiction Filmmaking
- In 2017, his film Rogue Warrior: Robot Fighter won awards for Best Actress and Best Visual Effects Feature Film at Worldfest Houston Film festival, Best Director & Best Science Fiction Film at Los Angeles Theatrical Release Competition Awards festival and Best Film (Staff Pick) & Best Sound Design at Action on Film Festival, USA
