= Action On Film International Film Festival =

Film festival

- Location: Las Vegas, Nevada, United States
- Founded: 2004
- Language: English
- Website: aoffest.com

The Action On Film International Film Festival, also known as the Action On Film Festival, was founded in 2004. It was held in California until 2017 when it moved to the Palms Hotel and Casino in Las Vegas. As a hub for many returning filmmakers, AOF has become an Official Distributor to SHORTS.TV as well as programming Feature Films for a number of Indie Theaters.

== History ==
The Action on Film International Film Festival was founded in 2004 by Del Weston. After being disappointed by a bad experience, Weston sought to create a festival where filmmakers could showcase their films. It was first held in Long Beach, California as a part of the Long Beach International Martial Arts Championships.

In 2008, it moved to Pasadena, California.

In 2012, it moved to Monrovia, California.

In 2017, it was moved to Las Vegas, Nevada.

The festival accepts all major genres and is not limited to action films.

== Major Awards ==
Each year the festival recognizes outstanding actors and projects in nearly eighty categories including the Action On Film Lifetime Achievement Awards. Winners of this award are:

=== Icon Awards ===
- Art Camacho
- Bill (Superfoot) Wallace
- Bob Wall
- Cynthia Rock
- Don (The Dragon) Wilson
- Ronnie (Mr. Olympia) Coleman
- Tazito Garcia

=== Lifetime Achievement Award ===
- David Carradine
- John Saxon
- Bill Duke
- John Savage
- W. Morgan Sheppard
- Talia Shire
- Bill Plympton
- James Best
- Robert Loggia
- Bo Svenson

=== The Alan Bailey Award for Excellence in the Craft of Filmmaking in a Major Genre ===
- Neil Johnson - Science Fiction Starship Apocalypse
- Amber Benson - Comedy - Shevenge
- Christopher Di Nunzio - Guerilla Film- A Life Not to Follow-
- James Christopher - Best Indie Film Quad X: Rise of the Beaver Slayer
- Bryan Martin - Webisode- Dark Memories
- JD Glasscock - Film Noir Series

=== Half Life Award ===
- Kim Coates
- Deborah Kara Unger
- Nick Mancuso
- Tom Sizemore
- Michael Paré

=== Maverick Award ===
- Tracey Birdsall
- Talia Shire
- Michael Madsen
- David Carradine
- Michelle Lukes
