= Starship: Apocalypse =

- Directed by: Neil Johnson
- Produced by: Philip Burthem; Neil Johnson; Cynthia Martin
- Starring: Darren Jacobs; Emii; Brooke Lewis; E.J. De la Pena; Ralph Guzzo; Christina Moses; Lynn Ayala; Joshua Paul Miller; Breck Gallini
- Cinematography: Kyle Wright
- Edited by: Dave Edison
- Music by: Charles-Henri Avelange
- Production company: Morphius Film
- Distributed by: 4Digital Media; Ayo Pro; Halcyon International Picture
- Release dates: 20 December 2014 (Japan); 18 September 2016 (United States)
- Running time: 86 minutes
- Country: United States
- Language: English

Starship: Apocalypse (also known as Starship: The Coming Darkness) is a 2014 action, Science fiction film directed by Neil Johnson and the sequel to Starship: Rising. The film was generally poorly received.

== Synopsis ==
After Starship Rising, Gustav a former federation general joins John Worthy’s rebel crew. However the rest of the galaxy is in chaos with the federation and rebel Terra Nostra fleets both split. John has uncovered that the federation and Terra Nostra rebels are both being run by the overseer. Gustav orders a ceasefire on the Terra Nostra planet where the federation and rebels are fighting.

Czarina the supreme commander hears about this and realises Gustav has betrayed them. She sends a fleet out to capture John, Guastav, and their crew. They are taken to Terminus the federation capital planet, where they are put on trial by the supreme commander. She sentences John, Guastav and Dianna to death. But Marta, another crew member, is instead sentenced to genetic rehabilitation.

Meanwhile Jolli and Torgus are flying in the outer rim, in a small escape pod. They land on Guada Prime where they meet an android. They witness John’s trial on the news, and with the help of the android take a ship to rescue him.

The supreme commander uses a DNA virus to rehabilitate Marta, this essentially zombifies her making her completely loyal to the supreme commander. John, Gustav and Diana are sent to the furnaces to be killed but are rescued by Jolli and Torgus.

Marta messages John asking for rescue, so John immediately goes to Terra Nostra. Using the ships advanced AI John easily defeats the guarding fleet above Terra Nostra and rescues Marta. However, Marta immediately starts spying on John and secretly relays information on his plans back to the supreme commander.

John and his crew travel to Terminus. Gustav and Dianna head to the surface to mount an attack while John and Jolli attempt to draw fire away from the planet. They receive a message from Gustav but before they can listen to it Marta kills Jolli and injures John. The ships AI intervenes and kills Marta.

Seethus, contacts the Overseer and reveals he is the Overseers son. The supreme commander commits treason, firing on the Overseers ship, but he activates the commanders ships self-destruct killing her. The Overseer fires the DNA virus as Terminus, zombifying all inhabitants. Seethus now joins Gustav and they gather all their remaining allies from Earth and destroy the Overseer’s fleet.

However the Overseer survives and fires the DNA virus at Earth, zombifying everyone on it. Seethus, immune to the virus, manages to escape and goes to the Overseers ship. John and Torgus also board the ship and are captured. The Overseer badly injures Torgus, but before he can kill John Seethus betrays him giving John the distraction he needs to injure the Overseer giving them chance to escape. The Overseer quickly regenerates, but John ejects him from the ship into the Sun.

The android travels to Terra Nostra and Terminus, both infected by the DNA virus, he destroys them to stop the virus spreading, and manages to cleanse Earth of the virus. As part of this it also destroys all of Earths technology to ensure humanity can never cause a war like this again. John, Torgus, Seethus, Gustav and Diana are all left on Earth, forever grounded on the planet while the android AI rules the rest of the galaxy. Five years later the android revisits Earth, bringing a resurrected Jolli back to John.

== Cast ==
- Darren Jacobs as John Worthy, Federation lieutenant who becomes a rebel fighter
- Emii as Jolli, Rebel fighter
- Brooke Lewis as Staris, Federation crew member who becomes a rebel fighter
- E.J. De la Pena as Torgus, Federation crew member who becomes a rebel fighter
- Ralph Guzzo as General Gustav, A general for the federation
- Christina Moses as Diana, Rebel fighter
- Rajia Baroudi as Supreme Commander/Czarina, Commander for the federation, who ensures the Overseers commands are executed
- Lynn Ayala as Marta, Rebel fighter
- Breck Gallini as Seethus, A federation officer and the Overseers son
- Michael Scott Martin as Overseer/High Pope
- Myke Michaels as Overseer, The ruler of the federation
- Neil Johnson as Overseer (voice), The ruler of the federation
