= Love Among Freaks =

American rock band

- Origin: New Jersey, US
- Genres: Alternative rock, funk rock
- Years active: 1991–2002
- Members: Steve Smyth; Layonne Holmes; Timo Scott; Bob Pantella; Alexis Lehman
- Past members: Scott Angley; Jay Kendall; Anthony Scalanga; Eric Donohue; Shawn Szoke

Love Among Freaks was an alternative rock/funk rock band, founded in the New Jersey, USA area.

== Beginning ==
Love Among Freaks was formed in the early 90s by Steve Smyth and Alexis Lehman. They were writing and recording original music with Steve singing and playing drums and Lex playing guitar and bass. In 1993 Scott Angley joined on guitar and Jay Kendall on drums. This version of the band was responsible for the Clerks soundtrack, which was originally recorded in 1993 and re-recorded in early 1994. Shortly after the recording of Clerks, Jay decided to move on and Bob Pantella took over on drums at the recommendation of Bob Butterfield. Pantella had previously played in Raging Slab.

Over the next two years, the band would record 3 EPs, appear on a few compilation albums, and play the NY-NJ-PA area to build a following, picking up Eric Donohue on keyboards for a brief period. However, tensions in the group took over and the group fell apart, leaving the original duo of Steve and Lex.

== LAF - Mark II ==
Picking up the pieces of what they had left, Steve and Lex decided to go in a new direction with a fresh start. The natural progression resulted in elements of electronica and hip-hop, and a heavier edge to the songs they wrote. Steve took on the duties of guitar along with his vocals. Lex added to his live bass duties with a sampling keyboard on stage to trigger various samples and drum loops. Shawn Szoke was brought on as the new drummer and used a number of drum triggers along with his acoustic kit. For about a year this edition of the Freaks was playing around the NY-NJ scene, and recorded a five-song EP.

== LAF - Mark III ==
Bob had come to see the Freaks in their new incarnation and mentioned the possibility of re-joining after Shawn decided to move on. In mid-1996, Bob introduced Layonne Holmes to Steve and Lex, and the four attended a Parliament-Funkadelic show in Central Park together. (Bob had played in the band Backwoods with Layonne in the early 1990s.) After the show, the four decided to re-shape the Freaks once again, adding an old-school funk element.

Layonne and Steve would complement each other on vocals, and Timo Scott was brought in to add percussion, background vocals, and added a great deal of live energy to the group. The band combined Lehman's use of funk with the bass, and Pantella had blended drum loops along with his live drumming at shows. Combinations like these made Love Among Freaks different from the rock scene.

In 1998, Love Among Freaks decided to finally release a full-length album, titled Representin' Planet Earth. The band became a staple of the New Jersey scene, but never broke into the mainstream audience.

== Movies ==
In the early 90s, the band members would visit the local convenience store just around the corner to buy cigarettes and coffee. It happened to be the same store where fledgling filmmaker Kevin Smith worked and was filming what was to become the cult-classic Clerks. Kevin Smith and Scott Angley were friends from high school and talked about scoring the film Kevin was working on. The band created the music for the film on a 4 track recorder and later re-recorded the music in a studio when the film was picked up by Miramax in 1994.

When the film went big, so did Love Among Freaks. The songs "Clerks" and "Berserker" were in the movie and soundtrack. The band would not release a full-length album until years later, after personnel changes that included the addition of vocalist Layonne Holmes and percussionist/spoken word poet Timo Scott.

The band reappeared in 1997 for Kevin Smith's 3rd movie, Chasing Amy. One of their songs was featured in the movie.

In 2000, the song "Bad Situation" was used in the movie Vulgar.

== Breakup ==
During the early 2000s, the band was working on demos for the follow-up to the "Representin' Planet Earth" album. Although a full album worth of songs was recorded, the band drifted apart and it was assumed that Love Among Freaks had broken up a while after.

Around 2003, Pantella invited Alexis Lehman to join his electronica band called Billyrubin with singer Mark Sunshine. Billyrubin released their debut, Billyrubin, in 2003. Bob Pantella soon went on to become the new drummer for the band Monster Magnet. In 2007 Pantella joined The Atomic Bitchwax. Also in 2007, Pantella and Jim Baglino (Human Remains, Dead Guy, Monster Magnet) formed RIOTGOD, along with Garrett Sweeny (of Psycho Daisy), and Mark Sunshine. In 2010, Pantella appeared on LadyKiller's debut self-titled release. He is credited as having played drums on 13 of the 16 songs, in addition to having tracked more than half of the album at his recording studio in Sayerville, NJ.

Steve Smyth has been a regular contributor to the Howard Stern Radio Show with his song parodies in 2006 and 2007.

Layonne later started a group (with her mother Delores Holmes, who previously sang backup for Bruce Springsteen) and continues to sing with various artists, such as Jon Bon Jovi and the Matt O'Ree band.

== Members ==
- Steve Smyth – lead vocals, guitar (1991–2002)
- Alexis Lehman – bass, keyboards (1991–2002)
- Scott Angley – guitar (1991–1995)
- Jay Kendall – drums (1991–1994)
- Bob Pantella – drums (1994–1996, 1997–2002)
- Anthony Scalanga – guitar (1995–1996)
- Eric Donohue – keyboards (1996)
- Shawn Szoke – drums (1996–1997)
- Layonne Holmes – lead vocals, backing vocals (1997–2002)
- Timo Scott – drums, backing vocals (1997–2002)

== Discography ==
- Clerks: Music from the Motion Picture - 1994
- Representin' Planet Earth - 1998
