= Back in Time (2015 film) =

- Promotional release poster
- Directed by: Jason Aron
- Produced by: Lee Leshen
- Starring: Michael J. Fox; Christopher Lloyd; Robert Zemeckis; Steven Spielberg; Bob Gale; Lea Thompson; Donald Fullilove; Claudia Wells; Huey Lewis; Alan Silvestri; Frank Price; Dan Harmon
- Cinematography: Gregory Lassik
- Music by: Allen Calmes; G.C. Johnson
- Production companies: Malka Media Group; Jason Aron Media; Patchwork Media
- Distributed by: FilmRise
- Release date: October 21, 2015
- Running time: 95 minutes
- Country: United States
- Language: English
- Budget: $190,000 (estimated)

Back in Time is a 2015 American documentary film directed by Jason Aron. The film explores the production, impact, and legacy of the Back to the Future film series, and includes interviews with members of the series' cast and crew, including Robert Zemeckis, Steven Spielberg, Michael J. Fox and Christopher Lloyd, as well as fans of the franchise.

== Synopsis ==
The film includes footage of various cast and crew members of the Back to the Future film series, discussing the trilogy and its cultural impact. Among these interviewees are actors Michael J. Fox, Christopher Lloyd, Lea Thompson, Donald Fullilove, and Claudia Wells; filmmakers Robert Zemeckis, Bob Gale, and Steven Spielberg; musicians Huey Lewis and Alan Silvestri; fans of the films such as Dan Harmon, co-creator of the Back to the Future-inspired animated series Rick and Morty; and former head of Columbia Pictures, Frank Price. While delving into the legacy of the films themselves, the documentary also studies the cultural importance of the DeLorean, used as a time machine in the series, the technology involved in creating a real-life hoverboard, and the cast and crew's experiences during the pre-production, production, and post-production of the original film. The documentary also featured prominent figures in the Back to the Future fan community, including screen-used DeLorean restoration team head Joe Walser, and the popular Back to the Future-themed nostalgia band The Flux Capacitors.

== Production ==
Back in Time began as a project conceived by Jason Aron, a fan of the Back to the Future series, that was posted to the crowdfunding website Kickstarter on June 26, 2013. Over 600 people backed the campaign, pledging over $45,000 in order for the documentary to be made. The film was shot over a period of two years; while production primarily took place in the United States, another filming location was that of London, England during a Back to the Future fan event. The film was released online on October 21, 2015, the day that the series' protagonist Marty McFly travels to in Back to the Future Part II. Shortly after its release, the documentary was added to the Netflix streaming service.

== Critical reception ==
Gregory Weinkauf of The Huffington Post said that the documentary "gets to the heart of the Back to the Future phenomenon, proving as enjoyable as the franchise it affectionately explores", calling it "a delightful return to, and updating of, a beloved story". Reviewer Logan J. Fowler of the website Pop-Break noted that while the film's segment on the science of hover technology didn't "seem to gel in with the rest of the documentary", it was "a well crafted and awesome look back at the movie that changed so many lives in the past, and will continue to do so in the future".
