= Lake Eerie =

- Directed by: Chris Majors
- Written by: Meredith Majors
- Produced by: Chris Majors; Meredith Majors; James Morales
- Starring: Lance Henriksen; Betsy Baker; Meredith Majors; Marilyn Ghigliotti; Anne Leigh Cooper; Al Snow
- Cinematography: David M. Brewer
- Music by: Harry Manfredini
- Production companies: Savage Beast Films; Solid Weld Productions
- Distributed by: Gravitas Ventures
- Release date: January 15, 2016
- Running time: 104 minutes
- Country: United States
- Language: English

Lake Eerie is a 2016 horror film, directed by Chris Majors, starring Lance Henriksen, Betsy Baker, Marilyn Ghigliotti, Tavares Jamal Cherry, Anne Leigh Cooper, Meredith Majors and Al Snow.

The movie had its world premiere at the HorrorHound Film Festival in September 2015 and was officially released on January 15, 2016, through Gravitas Ventures.

== Plot ==
A young widow moves into an old house on Lake Erie to recover from the sudden loss of her husband; however, she soon discovers a dark secret and that she is not alone.

== Cast ==
- Lance Henriksen as Pop
- Betsy Baker as Eliza
- Marilyn Ghigliotti as Realtor
- Al Snow as Man in Black
- Meredith Majors as Kate Ryan
- Tavares Jamal Cherry as Guardian
- Anne Leigh Cooper as Autumn
- Ben Furney as Jack Ryan

== Reception ==
Horrornews.net reviewed Lake Eerie, stating that "There’s the potential for a good movie that sometimes managed to shine through. For the most part, it was an entirely forgettable experience that wasted a good idea." DVD Talk panned the movie and stated that it was "insultingly poor and a complete waste of time".
