= Christina Moses =

American actress (born 1978)

- Born: Los Angeles, California, U.S.
- Education: The New School
- Occupations: Actress, producer
- Years active: 1992–present

Christina Marie Moses is an American actress. She is known for portraying Jana Mayfield on The CW's limited series Containment, Keelin on The CW drama series The Originals., and Regina in the Television series A Million Little Things. In 2016, she played the leading role of Marie Walker in the movie How We Met.

== Early life ==
Moses was born and raised in Los Angeles. Later she moved to New York City and lived there for 9 years where she taught black history through art and performed in various community and off-Broadway theatre after graduating from Eugene Lang College of Liberal Arts of The New School. Christina's father was an acting teacher, writer, and director.

== Career ==
Moses took part in an ABC Talent Showcase at the Acorn Theatre in 2008. This led to her securing an agent and she returned to Los Angeles. She booked roles in ABC Family's Twisted and The CW's Nikita. Moses also appeared in the fan project Star Trek: New Voyages. In 2014, Moses was cast as a series regular in the CW limited series Containment, created by showrunner Julie Plec.

Between 2017 and 2018, she played in the recurring cast the last royal werewolf and emergency doctor named Keelin Malraux, during the season 4 and season 5 of show "The Originals", from The CW. With romantic couple LGBT with the character of the actress Riley Voelkel, the powerful witch Freya Mikaelson.

At in 2018, she acted as part of the recurring cast of "Condor".

From 2018 to 2023, she was part of the main cast of the television series "A Million Little Things".

== Filmography ==
=== Film ===
Year	Title	Role	Notes
2010	Machete Joe	Kelly	As Christina Marie Moses
2011	Crows	Roberta Hamilton	As Christina Marie Moses
2012	Mumia: Long Distance Revolutionary	Miscellaneous cast	Documentary
2013	Head Case	Jordan	Short film; as Christina Marie Moses; also executive producer
2013	Hidden Talent	Lauren	Short; as Christina Marie Moses
2014	Odd Brodsky	Kitty	As Christina Marie Moses
2014	Starship: Rising	Diana	As Christina Marie Moses
2014	Starship: Apocalypse	Diana	As Christina Marie Moses
2014	Without You	Sammy Jones	Short; as Christina Marie Moses
2016	Salt Water	Dr. Regina G	As Christina Marie Moses
2016	How We Met	Marie Walker	
2019	Listen	Detective	Short, as Christina Marie Moses
2019	Tall Girl	Nina Dunkleman	
2020	Growth	Homeopath	Short
2023	The Pink	Ashley	Short
2023	Hollow	Dr. Diane	Short

=== Television ===
Year	Title	Role	Notes
1992	The Dollhouse Murders	Girl at Party	TV movie
2007	Star Trek: New Voyages	Alana	Episode: "World Enough and Time", AKA Star Trek: Phase II
2011	Nikita	Dana Winters	Episode: "Glass Houses"
2013	Welcome to Hollywood... Florida	Abby	TV movie; as Christina Marie Moses
2013	Twisted	Woman at Town Meeting	Episode: "The Fest and the Furious"
2016	Rosewood	Daphne	Episode: "Sudden Deaths & Shades Deep"
2016	Containment	Jana	Main role, 13 episodes
2016	Roadies	Lorraine Navarro	Episode: "Friends and Family"
2017	Mission Control	Letitia	TV movie; as Christina Marie Moses
2017–2018	The Originals	Keelin	Recurring role (season 4 and season 5), 16 episodes
2018–2023	A Million Little Things	Regina Howard	Main role, 87 episodes; also director, episode: "The Salesman"
2018	Condor	Sharla Shepard	Recurring role, 7 episodes
2019	The One Minute Joe Show	Christina	Episode: "Hiking Buddy"
2020	Space Command	Lianna Sekander	Episode: "Ripple Effect"
2024	Station 19	Wendy Wilson, Nina's mother	Episodes : "Good Grief", "Give It All"
