= Betsy Baker =

American actress

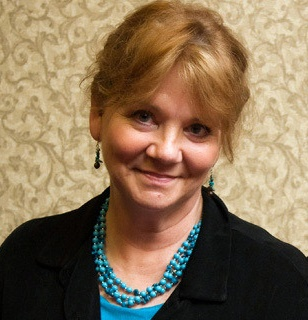
- Baker in 2009
- Born: Cedar Rapids, Iowa, U.S.
- Occupation: Actress
- Years active: 1981–present

Betsy Baker is an American actress, best known as playing Linda in the film The Evil Dead (1981).

== Early life ==
Baker was born in Cedar Rapids, Iowa, a middle child, and grew up in St. Joseph, Michigan. She started piano lessons at the age of five and also took voice lessons and studied dance. She attended Michigan State University and graduated with a degree in theater education and classical voice.

== Career ==
Baker landed the role of Linda in the film The Evil Dead after she came to Sam Raimi's attention in Detroit.

After a lengthy hiatus, in which she focused on being a mother, Baker resumed her acting career in 2006. Her most recent movie is Lake Eerie released in 2016.

== Filmography ==
=== Film ===
Year	Film	Role	Notes
1981	Word of Honor	Denise Mcneil	TV movie
1981	The Evil Dead	Linda	
1990	Appearances		TV movie
2007	Witches' Night	Marge	
2007	Brutal Massacre: A Comedy	Gladys Oppenheimer	
2007	Tim and Eric Awesome Show, Great Job!	MIDI Mom	TV series
2009	Dangerous Women	Linda	Series Lead (6 Episodes)
2009	ER	Dr. Wheeler	
2010	Southland	Middle Aged Woman	
2013	Oz the Great and Powerful	Quadling Woman	Cameo
2014	The Middle	Patient - Mrs. Parker	
2014	Days of Our Lives	Ozarks Waitress	2 Episodes
2014	True Blood	Midwife	
2015	Lake Eerie	Eliza	Horror film.
2016	Social Norm	Professor	

=== Television ===
Year	Film	Role	Notes
2015	New Girl	Drum Circle Woman	Episode: "Oregon"
2016	Grey's Anatomy	Barbara Davis	Episode: "I Ain't No Miracle Worker"
2022	NCIS	Ramona	Episode: "The Brat Pack"
2022	Bosch: Legacy	Jo Adcock	Episode: "Pumped"

=== Video games ===
Year	Film	Role	Notes
2022	Evil Dead: The Game	Linda	Voice
