= Litchfield Hills Film Festival =

The Litchfield Hills Film Festival is an American film festival that was founded in 2006 as the Kent Film Festival by Frank and Patrice Galterio. Originally held in Kent, CT, the festival expanded and moved to New Milford, CT in 2011 and Torrington, CT in 2012. The festival screens feature length, short, and documentary films and considers both national and international submissions.
