= Clerks (film) =

1994 film by Kevin Smith

- Theatrical release poster
- Directed by: Kevin Smith
- Written by: Kevin Smith
- Produced by: Scott Mosier; Kevin Smith
- Starring: Brian O'Halloran; Jeff Anderson; Marilyn Ghigliotti; Jason Mewes; Lisa Spoonauer
- Cinematography: David Klein
- Edited by: Scott Mosier; Kevin Smith
- Production company: View Askew Productions
- Distributed by: Miramax Films
- Release dates: January 22, 1994 (Sundance); October 19, 1994 (United States)
- Running time: 92 minutes
- Country: United States
- Language: English
- Budget: $27,575
- Box office: $4.4 million

Clerks is a 1994 American independent black-and-white comedy film written, produced, co-edited and directed by Kevin Smith in his debut. The independent film stars Brian O'Halloran, Jeff Anderson, Marilyn Ghigliotti, Jason Mewes, and Lisa Spoonauer, it presents a day in the lives of store clerks Dante Hicks (O'Halloran) and Randal Graves (Anderson) as well as their acquaintances. It is the first of Smith's View Askewniverse films, and introduces several recurring characters, notably Jay and Silent Bob (played by Mewes and Smith respectively).

The film was initially shot for $27,575 before its film rights were purchased by Miramax Films, and $230,000 was spent on music licensing and editing. It was shot in the convenience stores and video stores where Smith worked in real life.

Clerks had its premiere at the Sundance Film Festival on January 22, 1994, and was released in the United States on October 19. The film received positive reviews and grossed $4.4 million, launching Smith's career. Often regarded as a landmark in independent filmmaking, the film was selected for preservation in the United States National Film Registry by the Library of Congress in 2019 as being "culturally, historically, or aesthetically significant". In 2006, a sequel was released, followed by a third installment in 2022.

== Plot ==
On his day off, Dante Hicks, a retail clerk at the Quick Stop Groceries convenience store in Leonardo, New Jersey, is instructed by his boss to cover another employee's morning shift. Dante arranges to finish at noon to play a hockey game with friends. Finding the locks to the security shutters jammed closed with gum, he drapes a sheet over the shutters with "I ASSURE YOU; WE'RE OPEN!" written in shoe polish; he repeatedly laments, "I'm not even supposed to be here today."

His first customer attempts to convince customers they should buy Chewlies brand gum instead of cigarettes, displaying a bag containing what he claims is a diseased human lung corroded by tar. A hostile crowd blames Dante for spreading cancer because he sells cigarettes. Dante's girlfriend Veronica Loughran enters, calms the crowd with a fire extinguisher, and confronts the customer, actually a Chewlies representative. She evicts him with the crowd. Veronica converses behind the counter about Dante's current disposition then encounters an old boyfriend, a customer named Willam Black. She admits to Dante that she engaged in sex with Black and performed fellatio on 36 other guys before their current relationship. Dante reacts with jealousy, admitting to having sex with just twelve different women before her, and she storms out. Dante's best friend, wisecracking slacker Randal Graves, arrives late for his own workday at the RST Video rental store next door and reveals that Dante's unfaithful ex-girlfriend Caitlin Bree, with whom Dante still secretly communicates, is engaged. He spends his shift dealing with customers either angry and demanding, clueless and impolite, or unexpectedly wise.

At lunch, Dante and Veronica reconcile their respective sexual pasts and Dante learns his boss is vacationing in Vermont, leaving him to run the store. Dante convinces his friends to have their hockey game on the roof, and temporarily closes the store. An irate customer demands Dante open the store, criticizes his playing, and sabotages the game. When Dante discovers an ex-girlfriend, Julie Dwyer, has died, he and Randal depart for an unseen memorial service. Their conversation after fleeing the funeral home reveals that Randal accidentally toppled Julie's casket.

Two of Dante's former high school classmates, Rick Derris and Heather Jones, inform him that everyone else in their graduating class knew of Caitlin's infidelity and that Rick even had sexual intercourse with Caitlin. A health department representative arrives to question Dante and fines him $500 for selling cigarettes to a four-year-old, even though Randal actually sold them. Caitlin tells Dante she ended her engagement and he leaves to prepare for a date with her. She has sex in the store bathroom with someone she thinks is Dante. She is rendered catatonic on realizing it is an elderly customer who suffered a fatal heart attack while masturbating to a pornographic magazine and is carted away in an ambulance with the corpse.

Drug dealers Jay and Silent Bob enter the Quick Stop to shoplift and unsuccessfully invite Dante to party with them after hours. Aware of Dante's problems, Silent Bob reasons that he truly loves Veronica. When Randal reveals the previous events to her, she dumps Dante and Dante brawls with Randal, trashing the Quick Stop in the process.

Dante blames Randal for the day's events, repeating his mantra of "I'm not even supposed to be here today!". Randal reminds him he voluntarily left to slack off several times, and could've left at any point he wished. They reconcile after realizing neither are as "advanced" as they think, evidenced by their lowly jobs. After the two clean up the store, Dante plans to take the following day off to visit Caitlin in the hospital and attempt reconciliation with Veronica. Randal tosses Dante's shoe-polish sign in his face and declares, "You're closed!"

== Cast ==
- Brian O'Halloran as Dante Hicks
- Jeff Anderson as Randal Graves
- Marilyn Ghigliotti as Veronica Loughran
- Lisa Spoonauer as Caitlin Bree
- Jason Mewes as Jay
- Kevin Smith as Silent Bob
- Scott Mosier as Willam Black, Angry Hockey-Playing Customer, and Angry Mourner
- Scott Schiaffo as Chewlies gum representative
- Al Berkowitz as Old Man
- Walt Flanagan as Woolen Cap Smoker, Egg Obsessed Guidance Counselor, Offended Customer, and Cat-Admiring Bitter Customer
- Ed Hapstak as Sanford and Angry funeral woman
- Pattijean Csik as Coroner
- Ken Clark as Administer of Fine and Orderly
- Ernest O'Donnell as Trainer (Rick Derris)
- Kimberly Loughran as Heather Jones
- Gary Stern as Tabloid-reading Customer
- Lee Bendick as Wynarski the Impatient Customer
- John Henry Westhead as Olaf the Russian Metalhead
- Betsy Broussard as Dental School renter
- Grace Smith as Milk Maid
- Frances Cresci as Little Smoking Girl
- Joey Lauren Adams (2004 Special Edition) as Alyssa Jones (voice)
- Additional roles played by David Klein and Vincent Pereira

== Production ==
=== Development ===
When writing the script, writer and director Kevin Smith based the character of Dante Hicks on himself, Randal Graves on his friend Bryan Johnson, who appeared in Smith's subsequent films as Steve-Dave Pulski, and Jay on Jason Mewes, who ended up playing him in the movie. His writing was influenced by his experience working in a video store, where he consumed movies mostly by listening but not watching, because his eyes were on the customers.

=== Casting ===
Many of Smith's family and friends played roles due to budget constraints. One of them, Walt Flanagan, in addition to creating the character of Silent Bob's Russian metal-head cousin Olaf, plays four roles in this film: The "Woolen Cap Smoker" in the beginning, the famous "Egg Man" (both of which he reprises in Clerks III), the "Offended Customer" during the "jizz mopper" scene, and the "Cat Admiring Bitter Customer", as well as the final RST Video customer in a deleted scene. Smith never intended for Flanagan to play so many roles, but had to as the actors he hired for the roles did not show up, and would often, in jest, refer to Flanagan as "the Lon Chaney of the '90s". Flanagan would also appear in Smith's subsequent films as Walt "The Fanboy" Grover opposite Johnson's Steve-Dave.

Brian O'Halloran, a stage actor local to Kevin Smith, discovered an audition notice for the film that Smith gave to his community theatre. O'Halloran answered the notice and auditioned, unaware that he would be cast as the film's main character Dante; during auditioning, O'Halloran was informed by a friend of Smith's that all of the main characters were already cast.

Smith originally wrote the part of Randal for himself, dryly admitting in the DVD audio commentary to be the reason why he gave Randal his most-liked lines. However, Smith found that writing, directing, working at the store and playing a lead role all simultaneously was too difficult, and he constantly forgot his lines in the process. Consequently, he gave the role of Randal to his friend, Jeff Anderson, while Smith took on the less-demanding role of Silent Bob.

To acquire the funds for the film, Smith sold off a large portion of his extensive comic book collection in 1993, which he later bought back; borrowed $3,000 from his parents; maxed out eight to ten credit cards with $2,000 limits; and spent a portion of funds he got back from his college education, paychecks from working at Quick Stop and RST, and insurance money awarded for property of his lost and/or damaged in a storm-flood, thus adding up the total budget to $27,575.

=== Filming ===
Clerks was shot on an Arriflex SR-2 camera, utilizing black-and-white 16mm Kodak Plus X film stock, and roughly edited due to its small budget. The film was shot in 21 days (with two "pick-up" days).

The Quick Stop convenience store, located at 58 Leonard Avenue in Leonardo, New Jersey, where Smith worked, was the primary setting for the film. He was only allowed to film in the store at night while it was closed (from 10:30 p.m. to 5:30 a.m.), hence the plot point of the shutters being closed due to a vandal having jammed gum in the padlocks. Because Smith was working at Quick Stop during the day and shooting the film at night, he frequently slept no more than an hour a day. By the end of the 21-day shoot, Smith was unable to stay awake while Dante and Randal's fight was shot.

Jason Mewes, who plays Jay, is not in any of the photoshoots for Clerks. Miramax Films, who bought the film's distribution rights following its run at the Sundance Film Festival, believed Jay had no commercial appeal, and would scare audiences rather than entice them.

The MPAA originally gave the film an NC-17 rating based purely on the film's explicit dialogue. Despite the rating, the movie contains no violence aside from Dante and Randal's fight near the end, no sex and no clearly depicted nudity. This could have had very serious financial implications, as very few cinemas in the United States screened NC-17 films. Miramax Films hired civil liberties lawyer Alan Dershowitz to appeal the decision. However, the case was ultimately argued by a Miramax Films lawyer. The MPAA relented and re-rated the film with the more commercially viable "R" rating, without any alterations.

=== Lost scene ===
The events of Julie Dwyer's wake were written by Smith but were not filmed due to the prohibitive cost of producing the scene. In 2004, the scene was produced in colored animation using the same style of Clerks: The Animated Series, featured O'Halloran and Anderson reprising their roles and Joey Lauren Adams in a cameo as her character Alyssa Jones, who'd later appear in further View Askewniverse films, for the tenth anniversary DVD release. The "lost scene" was also presented in comic-book form of the Clerks comic book series, with the title of "The Lost Scene".

=== Original ending ===
The original ending for the film was meant to continue from when Randal throws the "I Assure You We're Open" sign to Dante. After Randal leaves, Dante proceeds to count out the register and does not notice another person entering the store. Dante at first thinks it's Randal but looks up and informs the person that the store is no longer open. The man then pulls out a gun and shoots Dante, killing him, before proceeding to rob the cash register and leave the store. The sequence ends with Dante's dead face looking off past the camera; after the credits roll – the soundtrack over it being a cash register making noises – a customer (played by Smith with his beard shaved off) wearing glasses and in a ponytail and a baseball jersey comes into the store, sees no one around (as Dante is lying dead behind the counter), steals a pack of cigarettes, and runs off.

The depressing ending was criticized by Bob Hawk and John Pierson after its first screening at the Independent Feature Film Market, and under Pierson's advice, Smith cut the ending short, ending with Randal's departure and deleting Dante's death. Fans have since analyzed the death of Dante as an homage to the ending of The Empire Strikes Back (1980), which is discussed earlier in the film as Dante's favorite Star Wars movie because "it ended on such a down note". The film's extended cut also implied that, because Randal disconnected the security camera earlier in the day during the roof hockey scene, the killer would never be caught.

Smith has since claimed he concluded Clerks this way for three reasons. The primary reason was irony, with the ending serving as payoff for Dante's repeated claims of "I'm not even supposed to be here today!" throughout the film. Smith also stated that the ending was an homage to one of his favorite films, Spike Lee's Do the Right Thing (1989), a comedic film with a dark ending. Lee's name can also be seen in the "special thanks" portion of the credits. Smith also stated that he ended Clerks with Dante's death because he "didn't know how to end a film". Both versions are available in Clerks X, the tenth-anniversary special edition; the lost ending itself was among the extras on the 1995 LaserDisc and the 1999 DVD release; Smith states in the audio commentary on the 1999 DVD that had he kept the original ending, likely no further View Askewniverse films would have been made. The culprit in question was played by Smith's cousin John Willyung, who went on to appear in Smith's later films (most notably as Cohee Lunden in Chasing Amy and Clerks III and as himself in Jay and Silent Bob Reboot). On their movie review show, Gene Siskel and Roger Ebert (both of whom had given thumbs-up reviews to the film in 1994) had a special segment on a November 1995 episode that presented and discussed this original ending. Siskel said that having the alternate ending could have worked but it would have to be longer with more build-up to suggest that something like this could happen, while Ebert said he understood Smith's desire to do something memorable/shocking to end the film but concluded "ultimately, I'm glad Smith decided to spare Dante."

== Release ==
Originally playing to an empty theater on the closing day of the 1993 Independent Feature Film Market (IFFM) in New York, Clerks was discovered and rescued by legendary producer/consultant Bob Hawk, who helped to shepherd the film to its 1994 Sundance Film Festival premiere. At Sundance, it was picked up by Miramax Films and released in theaters. It also became a surprise hit, grossing over $3 million in the United States despite never playing on more than 100 theater screens in the United States at the same time. It grossed $1.3 million internationally for a worldwide gross of $4.4 million.

== Reception ==
Clerks was well received by critics and developed a cult following. On Rotten Tomatoes, it currently has an approval rating of 90% based on 61 reviews, with an average rating of 7.60/10. The website's critical consensus reads: "With its quirky characters and clever, quotable dialogue, Clerks is the ultimate clarion call for slackers everywhere to unite, and, uh, do something, we guess?" On Metacritic, the film has a weighted average score of 70 out of 100, based on 17 critics, indicating "generally favorable" reviews.

Roger Ebert gave the film three stars out of a possible four, praising it for interestingly depicting a full day of "utterly authentic" middle-class life, adding: "Within the limitations of his bare-bones production, Smith shows great invention, a natural feel for human comedy, and a knack for writing weird, sometimes brilliant, dialogue." Peter Travers gave the film four out of four stars, calling attention to Anderson's "deadpan comic brilliance" and writing that "Smith nails the obsessive verbal wrangling of smart, stalled twentysomethings who can't figure out how to get their ideas into motion."

=== Year-end lists ===
- 8th – Yardena Arar, Los Angeles Daily News
- 10th – Todd Anthony, Miami New Times
- 11th – Peter Travers, Rolling Stone
- Top 10 (listed alphabetically, not ranked) – Bob Ross, The Tampa Tribune
- Top 10 (listed alphabetically, not ranked) – Jeff Simon, The Buffalo News
- Top 10 (not ranked) – Betsy Pickle, Knoxville News-Sentinel
- Top 10 runners-up (not ranked) – Janet Maslin, The New York Times
- Honorable mention – Dan Webster, The Spokesman-Review
- Honorable mention – Michael MacCambridge, Austin American-Statesman

=== Legacy ===
When released, the film was noted for its realism and memorable characters. Clerks won the "Award of the Youth" and the "Mercedes-Benz Award" at the 1994 Cannes Film Festival, tied with Fresh for the "Filmmakers Trophy" at the Sundance Film Festival and was nominated for three Independent Spirit Awards (Best First Feature, Best First Screenplay and Jeff Anderson for Best Debut Performance). In 2000, readers of Total Film voted Clerks the 16th-greatest comedy film of all time and in 2006, Empire listed Clerks as the fourth greatest independent film. The film is also No. 33 on Bravo's 100 Funniest Movies. In 2008, Entertainment Weekly ranked it 13th on "The Cult 25: The Essential Left-Field Movie Hits Since '83" and 21st on "The Comedy 25: The Funniest Movies of the Past 25 Years". Also in 2008, Empire named it one of their "500 Greatest Movies of All-Time", placing it 361st on the list. The film was also one of the 500 films nominated for a spot on AFI's 100 Years…100 Laughs but failed to make the top 100. The film was also included in the book 1001 Movies You Must See Before You Die.

In 2019, Clerks was among 25 films chosen to be added to the Library of Congress' National Film Registry.

Clerks was re-released on October 18 and 19, 2024 in select Cineplex theaters for its 30th anniversary.

== Home media ==
Clerks was first released on VHS on May 23, 1995. This was followed by a LaserDisc version on August 30, 1995, and a DVD on June 29, 1999. The laserdisc and DVD versions feature the original letterboxed version of the film, audio commentary by Smith and various cast and crew members, seven deleted scenes from the film, a theatrical trailer, and a tie-in music video for Soul Asylum's "Can't Even Tell" directed by Smith features the film's cast reprising their roles.

The film was released on UMD (playable on PlayStation Portable) on November 15, 2005. Special features include "Clerks: The Lost Scene", "The Flying Car", and original cast auditions. In the fall of 2006, a new edition of the Clerks DVD appeared in Canada, dubbed the Clerks: Snowball Edition. This release is the 1999 DVD with a new slipcover with a photo of a bikini-clad model, made to resemble one of the porn videos Randal mentions in the film. Smith was not involved in, nor was aware of this release.

Outside the United States, Clerks was distributed in the United Kingdom by Artificial Eye with Fox Video through Fox Guild Home Entertainment handling rental sales, and in Canada by Alliance Atlantis. Since 2020, DVD and Blu-Ray distribution has been handled by Paramount Home Entertainment following Paramount Global's acquisition of 49% of Miramax.

=== 2004 Clerks X special edition ===
On September 7, 2004, Clerks X was released to celebrate the film's tenth anniversary. This three-disc set features a restored picture and revised soundtrack, as well as the animated Lost Scene, an unrestored First Cut featuring the deleted scenes and original ending, original cast auditions, a new making-of documentary entitled The Snowball Effect, a Tonight Show short film starring Dante and Randal entitled The Flying Car, Smith and Mosier's student film Mae Day, eight MTV spots with Jay and Silent Bob, a 10th anniversary Q&A with the cast and crew, film festival articles and reviews, and new video introductions from Smith and Mosier. All these features were carried over to the 15th Anniversary Blu-ray on November 17, 2009, along with a new documentary, Oh, What a Lovely Tea Party—originally made for Smith's 2001 film Jay and Silent Bob Strike Back. Unlike the initial 1999 DVD, Clerks X is currently out of print.

== Soundtrack ==
The soundtrack was released on October 11, 1994 by Columbia Records under their Chaos imprint. It was composed of various new and previously released songs by alternative rock, grunge and punk rock artists such as Bad Religion, Love Among Freaks, Alice in Chains and Soul Asylum. The soundtrack also featured various sound clips from the film. It has been noted that Clerks is one of the very few films in which the cost of obtaining the rights to the music used was a great portion of the production costs for the entire film.

The Soul Asylum song "Can't Even Tell", which was played over the film's end credits and featured on the soundtrack, peaked at number 16 on the Billboard Hot Modern Rock Tracks chart in 1994. The music video for the song was directed by Smith and was filmed in the same locations as the film. The video featured Smith, Jason Mewes, Jeff Anderson and Brian O'Halloran reprising their roles from Clerks.

Another song which appeared on the soundtrack was "Got Me Wrong" by Alice in Chains, which had previously been released on the band's extended play Sap (1992). The song was issued as a single in late 1994, due to renewed radio interest from the song's appearance in Clerks. The song peaked at #7 on the Billboard Hot Mainstream Rock Tracks and #22 on the Billboard Modern Rock Tracks in early 1995.

== Franchise ==
Although not direct sequels in terms of addressing the original film's storyline, characters from the original Clerks – primarily Jay and Silent Bob – appeared in the films Mallrats (1995), Chasing Amy (1997), Dogma (1999), Jay and Silent Bob Strike Back (2001) and Jay and Silent Bob Reboot (2019), all of which take place in the same continuity as Clerks. Dante and Randal also reprised their roles in Jay and Silent Bob Strike Back, which was originally promoted as the finale to the series, but an official sequel to Clerks was announced a few years later.

=== Sequels ===
==== Clerks II ====
The live-action, feature film sequel to Clerks was released on July 21, 2006. The working title was The Passion of the Clerks, though the film was released under the title Clerks II. The credits for Dogma stated: "Jay and Silent Bob will return in Clerks 2: Hardly Clerkin' "; however, that project "evolved" into Jay and Silent Bob Strike Back. The sequel features O'Halloran, Anderson, Mewes and Smith (in addition to returning as writer, director and editor) reprising their roles as Dante, Randal, Jay and Silent Bob. The former two now work at a Mooby's restaurant after Randal accidentally destroys the Quick Stop and RST Video while the latter two, having sobered up after six months in rehab, continue their drug selling antics in the parking lot of the restaurant.

==== Clerks III ====
Smith first discussed the idea of doing a third movie during Clerks II promotions, saying it might be something he'd revisit in his 40s or 50s. After various delays—including funding issues, cast hesitations, and shifting plans—Smith confirmed the project in 2019. Filming took place in August 2021 in New Jersey, with the film premiering on September 4, 2022. Clerks III, released on September 13, 2022, is the final entry in the Clerks trilogy, featuring the return of O’Halloran, Anderson, Mewes, and Smith as Dante, Randal, Jay, and Silent Bob. Now co-owners of the Quick Stop, Dante and Randal are inspired to make a movie about their lives behind the counter.

=== Television series ===
Following Clerks, Smith set several more films in the same "world", which he calls the View Askewniverse of overlapping characters and stories. Of all of Smith's films, however, Clerks is the one with the most direct spin-off products.

==== Clerks: The TV Show ====
A pilot for a live-action television series was produced in 1995. It was produced by Touchstone Television and was to be developed by Richard Day. The pilot only referenced the character names and starred none of the cast from the original film, contained no foul language (except words suitable enough for a TV-PG rating which began in 1997) and did not feature Silent Bob. The character of Jay was featured, prompting Smith to point out that he owned the character rights to both Jay and Silent Bob (for the purposes of featuring them in separate films). The producers' solution was to change the character's name to Ray. Smith was unaware of the production of the series until casting was underway. Smith, as well as Mosier and Mewes, had been knee-deep with the production of Mallrats at the time and attempted to become involved in the series, but became disheartened quickly as an episode he had written for the series was shot down to be used as a potential B-plot. He would later use the script for an episode of Clerks: The Animated Series.

O'Halloran and Anderson both auditioned to reprise their roles of Dante and Randal from the film but were replaced by Andrew Lowery and future Saturday Night Live performer Jim Breuer. After seeing the result, Smith, Mosier, Mewes, O'Halloran and Anderson all said that it was terrible, with O'Halloran and Anderson further stating they were both glad they weren't involved.

==== Clerks: The Animated Series ====
Touchstone Television (with Miramax Films) also produced Clerks: The Animated Series a short-lived six-episode animated television series featuring the same characters and cast of the original film. Two episodes aired on ABC in late May/early June 2000 before being pulled from the lineup. The full six episodes were released on DVD in 2001 before being run on Comedy Central in 2002 and Adult Swim from 2008 to 2010. In a trailer for Jay and Silent Bob Strike Back, Randal, referencing the series, says to Dante: "If you were funnier than that, ABC would've never cancelled us."

=== Other media ===
==== Clerks: The Comics ====
Clerks. is a series of comics written by Smith featuring characters from the film. In the series are Clerks: The Comic Book, Clerks: Holiday Special, and Clerks: The Lost Scene. Smith has discussed plans for Clerks 1.5, a comic that would bridge the gap between the original film and its sequel, to be included in a reprint of the Clerks. trade paperback. The story ultimately was printed in the 2006 Tales from the Clerks collection, which also included the other Clerks comics with additional View Askewniverse material. Smith received the Harvey Award for Best New Talent in 1999.

==== Shooting Clerks ====
Shooting Clerks is a 2021 biographical comedy-drama film about the making of Clerks. The film stars many of the original film's stars, including O'Halloran, Ghigliotti, Mewes and Smith himself. The film had a special fine cut screening at San Diego Comic-Con on July 20, 2019, in celebration of the 25th anniversary of the original film's release.

== See also ==
- List of cult films
- List of films featuring fictional films

== Bibliography ==
- Muir, John Kenneth (2002). An Askew View : The Films of Kevin Smith. Applause Books. ISBN 1-55783-586-1
- Smith, Kevin (1997). Clerks and Chasing Amy : Two Screenplays. Miramax Books. ISBN 0-7868-8263-8
