= Brooke Lewis Bellas =

American actress

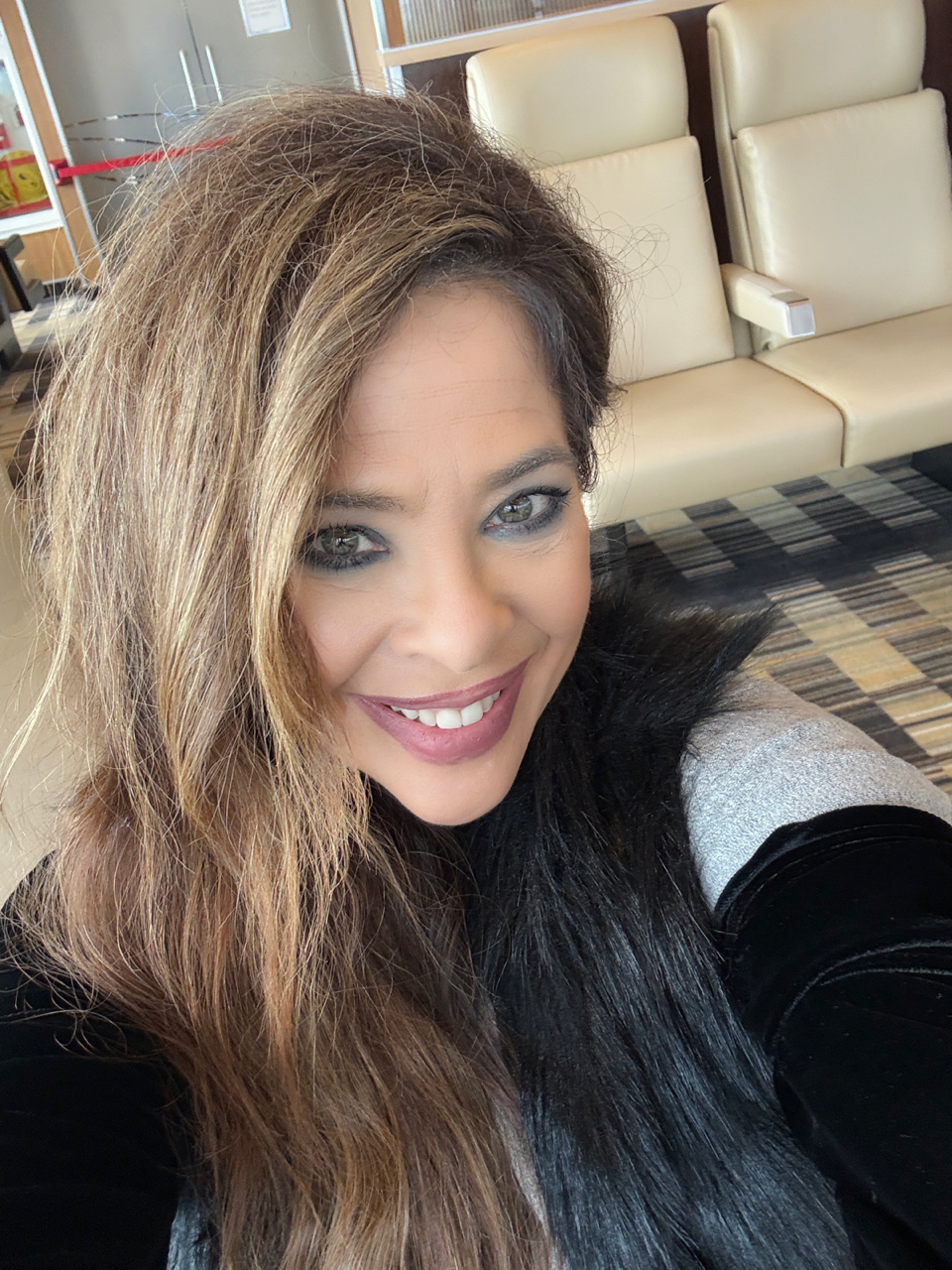
- Born: September 1, 1975 (age 51); Philadelphia, Pennsylvania
- Occupations: Actress, producer, writer, author, TV personality, philanthropist
- Years active: 1986–present
- Notable work: iMurders, Sinatra Club
- Spouse: Mark Bellas
- Website: brookelewisbellas.com

Brooke Lewis Bellas (born September 1, 1975) is an American actress and producer known for the mystery thriller Kinky Killers (2007) on Showtime opposite Charles Durning and Michael Pare, the mystery thriller iMurders (2008) on Starz opposite Billy Dee Williams, Gabrielle Anwar and Frank Grillo, the mobster movie Sinatra Club (2010) on Netflix opposite Michael Nouri, Danny Nucci and Jason Gedrick, and her alter-ego character Ms. Vampy.

After growing up in Philadelphia and New Jersey, she began her television career as a dancer on Dance Party USA on USA Network, then moved to New York City and booked the role of Donna Marsala in the Off-Broadway comedy Tony n' Tina's Wedding. After moving to Hollywood, she launched Philly Chick Pictures in 2002 to create more opportunities for herself as an actress. In 2007, she played Dr. Grace Sario in Kinky Killers, which aired on Showtime, earning the title "Scream Queen".

== Career ==
=== Acting ===
Lewis Bellas began her professional acting career in New York City, debuting as Donna Marsala in the Actors' Equity Off-Broadway production Tony n' Tina's Wedding. After fulfilling a three-year contract in theatre, she transitioned to film and television. She was cast as Ricko's girl in the Miramax film 54, appearing alongside Mark Ruffalo and Ryan Phillippe, although her scenes were later removed due to budgetary issues.

Lewis Bellas continued working in New York with roles on the television series One Life to Live and in the film Pride and Loyalty. After relocating to Hollywood, she appeared as the lead in the teaser film that placed third in the original Project Greenlight (2001) on HBO, and landed notable TV roles in Quintuples on FOX and Mafiosa. Lewis Bellas later co-starred in iMurders, Polycarp, Sinatra Club, Dahmer vs. Gacy and Starship: Rising.

In 2009, Lewis Bellas created the TV show, Ms. Vampy, which was followed by Ms. Vampy's Tween Tawk, Teen Tawk & In Between Tawk (2011) and Ms. Vampy's Love Bites (2013). In 2015, she co-starred in The Mourning alongside Dominique Swain, which was selected as part of the SAG-AFTRA Foundation Independent Features Screening Series, later appearing opposite Casper Van Dien in Stripped. In 2019, she was invited into The Carney Board for the Carney Awards Character Actor Hall of Fame created in honor of character actor Art Carney. In 2020, she was honored in the best-selling historical commemorative coffee table book 1000 Women In Horror, 1895-2018 with veteran icons Elizabeth Taylor, Joan Collins, Karen Black, and Jamie Lee Curtis. In 2021, she was inducted into the Phillytainment PA Celebrity Hall Of Fame.

Lewis Bellas also released a thriller web series with director Joshua Butler titled Red Rooms, which was screened at the Catalyst Story Institute and First Glance Philadelphia Film Festival in 2022. She later starred in the audio drama series A Voice In Violet, for which she received the Indie Series Awards Best Actress Audio Fiction Series Award and the Telly Award in 2024.

=== Coaching ===
Lewis Bellas is also a dating and relationship coach and expert. She has done writing, speaking and TV segments for numerous media outlets such as CBS, Huffington Post, FOX and many more. She is also known as the co-host on the dating talk show Breaking Dating.

=== Fashion ===
In 2016, Lewis Bellas partnered with Rock n’ Roll Lifestyle Company; Metal Babe Mayhem to produce their Rock Your Hot Mess clothing line, and later that year she partnered with TASH Cosmetics to produce their Profess Your Hot Mess make-up and skin care line.

== Philanthropy ==
Lewis Bellas performed on Broadway at the August Wilson Theatre and the Palace Theatre to support the charity Broadway Cares/Equity Fights AIDS and is a Rowdy Activist for The Elizabeth Taylor AIDS Foundation. Since 2008, Lewis Bellas has been an activist for breast cancer charities, including the Busted Foundation, The Lynn Sage Foundation, and Women Empowerment. She was the Hot Hunks of Horror Hottie on the 2009 calendar benefiting The Lynn Sage Foundation for breast cancer research and was co-captain of the Horror Starlets team for Bowling For Boobies, which raised funds and awareness for Busted Foundation. In 2014, she became an active participant in feeding the homeless on Skid Row at the Los Angeles Mission. Lewis Bellas was a celebrity judge for the No Bull Teen Video Awards 2014 to help stop bullying. In 2016, Lewis Bellas became a Celebrity Ambassador for The Breaking The Chains Foundation (BTCF) to support those with eating disorders, body image issues and self-esteem issues. She donates money to a charity called the Actor's Fund.

== Bibliography ==
In 2016, Lewis Bellas authored Coaching From A Professed Hot Mess. In 2017, Lewis Bellas authored Ms. Vampy's Teen Tawk: There's A Lotta Power In Ya Choices.

== Filmography ==
=== Film ===
Year	Title	Role	Notes
1998	54	Ricko's Girl	
1998	Tumble Dry	Candy	
1999	At First Sight	Hockey Fan #2	
1999	A Packing Suburbia	Roselle	
1999	Fare Well Miss Fortune	Cassidy	
2001	The Rules (For Men)	Tori	
2002	Code Blue	Angelica	Short
2002	Pride and Loyalty	Louise	
2003	A Man Apart	Pomona Joe's Girl	
2003	Carnage & Deception: A Killer's Perfect Murder	Sexy Bar Girl	Short
2005	Circuit Riders	Lori Horhind	Short
2005	Tinsel Town	Melanie	
2007	2 Minutes Later	Allison	
2007	Polycarp	Dr. Grace Sario	
2008	The Drum Beats Twice	Liz	
2008	Break	The Bitch At The Bar	
2008	iMurders	Agent Lori Romano	
2009	Momma's Redemption	Candy Connolly	Short
2010	Slime City Massacre	Nicole	
2010	Dahmer vs. Gacy	Tammy Hart	
2010	Texas Frightmare Massacre	Scream Queen	
2010	Sinatra Club	Rosella	
2010	Bare Knuckles	Cassandra's Manager	
2010	Gerald	Bowler Betty	
2010	Sprinkles	Maura	Short
2011	Choose	Erika	Short
2011	Double Tap	Sheila	
2012	Alien Dawn	Chiara Pelligrini	
2013	Keepsakes	The Jewelry Collector	Short
2014	Lazarus: Apocalypse	Ms. Daniels	
2014	Starship: Rising	Staris	
2014	Dawn of Destruction	Chaira Pelligrini	
2014	Starship: Apocalypse	Staris	
2015	The Mourning	Lisa	
2015	Killer Rack	Killer Rack (voice)	
2016	Psycho Therapy	Tonia	Short
2017	Allen + Millie: A Short Romance	Millie Lane	Short
2018	Rotting Love	Porsche	Short
2019	1/2 New Year	Pam DeLuca	
2019	Shevenge	Tonia	
2020	BSA Live	A Star	
2020	Wait for the Sun	Brooke	Short
2021	The Second Age of Aquarius	Tawny Stevens	
2022	Guns of Eden	Justice Jenny	
2024	Purgy's	Woman	Short

=== Television ===
Year	Title	Role	Notes
1997	Saturday Night Live	Dancer	Episode: "Helen Hunt/Hanson"
1998	One Life to Live	Nurse #1	Episode: "Episode #1.7653" & "#1.7659"
2001	All About Us	The Girl	Recurring Cast
2004	Quintuplets	Gina Grazano	Episode: "Swing, Swing, Swing"
2006-07	Mafiosa	Mercedes Brasi	Main Cast
2008	Scream Queens	Vampire's Assistant Amanda	Episode: "Episode #1.6"
2009	Ms. Vampy	Ms. Vampy	Main Cast
2011	Ms. Vampy's Tween Tawk, Teen Tawk & In Between Tawk	Ms. Vampy	Main Cast
2013	Ms. Vampy's Bites	Ms. Vampy	Main Cast
2013	Ms. Vampy's Love Bites	Ms. Vampy	Main Cast
2015	Breaking Dating	Host/Dating Expert	Main Host
2023	Red Rooms	Leilah Black	Main Cast

=== Music video ===
Year	Song	Artist	Role
2013	"Watch What You Ask For"	Suze Lanier-Bramlett featuring Michael Berryman	The Vampiress
2016	"Monster House"	Fawn	Scream Queen

== Awards and recognition ==
=== Filmography ===
- 2010: B-Movie Golden Cob Award - Scream Queen Of The Year 2010.
- 2011: Action on Film Award - Write Brothers Excellence in Film and Video, Sprinkles.
- 2012: 18th Annual Communicator Awards - Award Of Distinction, Ms. Vampy's Tween Tawk, Teen Tawk & In Between Tawk.
- 2016: Zed Fest Film Festival - Mary Pickford Award as an Exceptional Example of Women in the Art and Business of Motion Picture Production for Acting and Producing.
- 2017: Actors Awards - Best Actress In A Drama, Sprinkles.
- 2017: Los Angeles Film Awards - Inspiring Woman in a Film Award, Ms. Vampy's Tween Tawk, Teen Tawk & In Between Tawk.
- 2017: West Coast Film Festival - Grace Kelly Gold Actor Award, Sprinkles.
- 2018: Actors Awards - Best Actress In An Indie Film, Psycho Therapy.

=== Bibliography ===
- Halloween Book Festival – Winner Grand Prize Top Honor.
- Paris Book Festival – Winner Young Adult Book.
