= Claudia Wells =

American actress (born 1966)

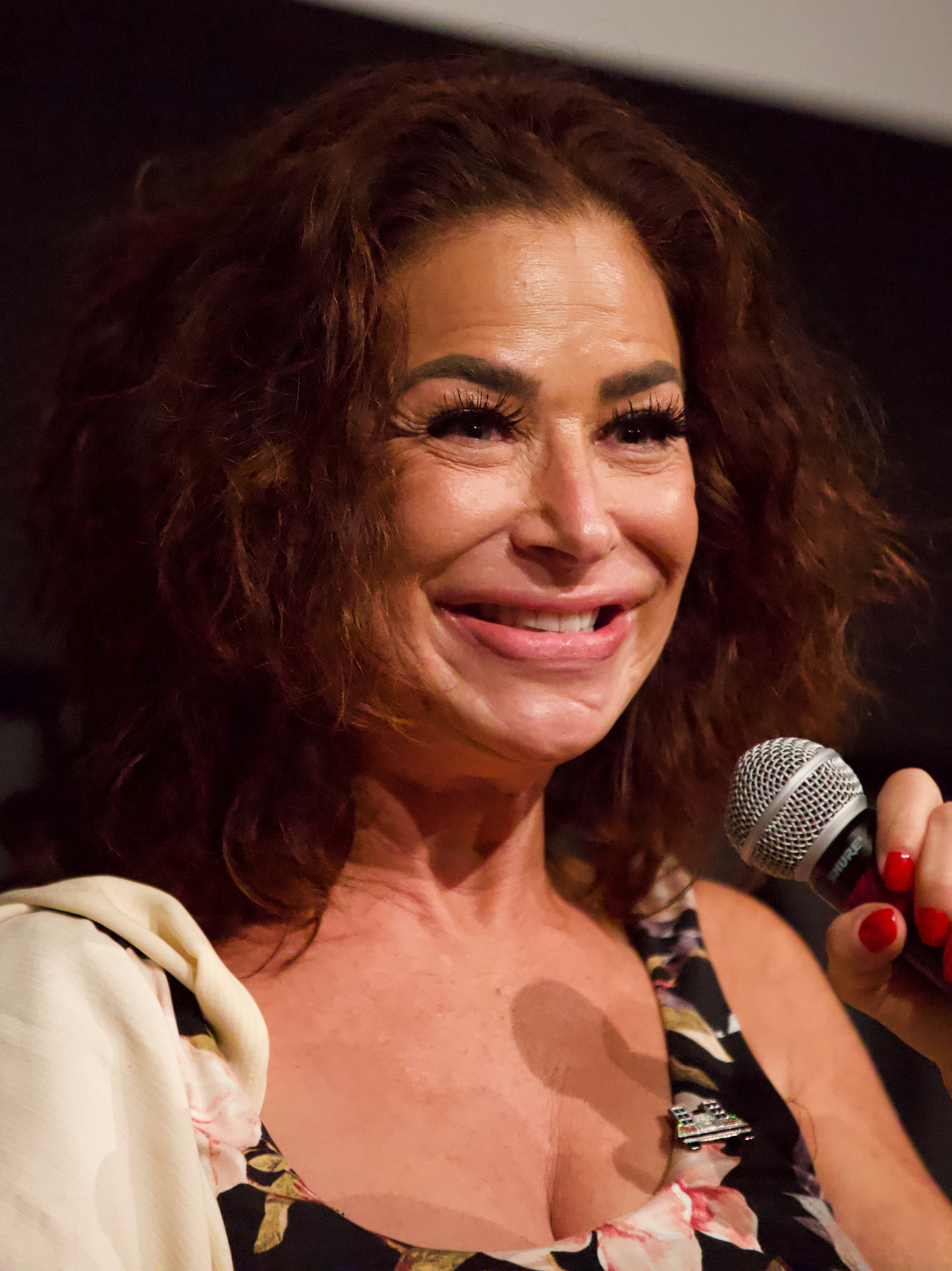
- Wells in 2022
- Born: July 5, 1966 (age 59); Kuala Lumpur, Malaysia
- Occupation: Actress
- Years active: 1974–1986; 1996–present
- Known for: Jennifer Parker in Back to the Future
- Children: 1
- Website: www.claudiawells.com www.armaniwells.com

Claudia Wells (born July 5, 1966) is an American actress, best known for playing Jennifer Parker in the 1985 film Back to the Future.

== Early life ==
Wells was born on July 5, 1966 in Kuala Lumpur, Malaysia. Her family moved to the San Francisco Bay area when she was seven weeks old. She went to Marin Country Day School and French-American Bilingual School. As of 2014, some of her family still lived in that area. Wells moved to Los Angeles at the age of 14, later graduating from Beverly Hills High School. She has one brother and a sister named Jennifer.

== Career ==
Wells appeared in ten operas between ages eight and twelve. She began acting in TV shows in the late 1970s.

Wells played Jennifer Parker, Marty McFly's girlfriend, in the 1985 film Back to the Future. She almost did not end up in the first film of the successful franchise. According to Wells, she had been cast, but a pilot she had done for ABC had been picked up, and she was contractually forced to drop out of Back to the Future. During that time, Eric Stoltz had been shooting for five weeks in the role of Marty McFly. The producers halted filming and replaced Stoltz with Michael J. Fox. By then, Wells's pilot had been finished and she was recast as Jennifer, now shooting alongside Fox, having never filmed a frame with Stoltz.

Also in 1985, Wells co-starred in "Stop the Madness", an anti-drug music video sponsored by the Reagan administration, featuring several famous musicians, actors and athletes. In 1986, she appeared in the TV movie Babies Having Babies, and the short-lived series Fast Times, a TV adaptation of the 1982 film Fast Times at Ridgemont High (Wells played Linda Barrett, portrayed by Phoebe Cates in the film). On December 19, 1991, Wells founded a Studio City, Los Angeles-based clothing store, Armani Wells, which she still owns and manages as of 2024.

After her mother was diagnosed with breast cancer, Wells put her career on hold for family reasons, and told the studio she would not be available to reprise her Back to the Future role for the two sequels. Actress Elisabeth Shue replaced her. Her mother subsequently died in October 1994.

She did not appear again on-screen until the 1996 independent film, Still Waters Burn (released on DVD February 12, 2008).

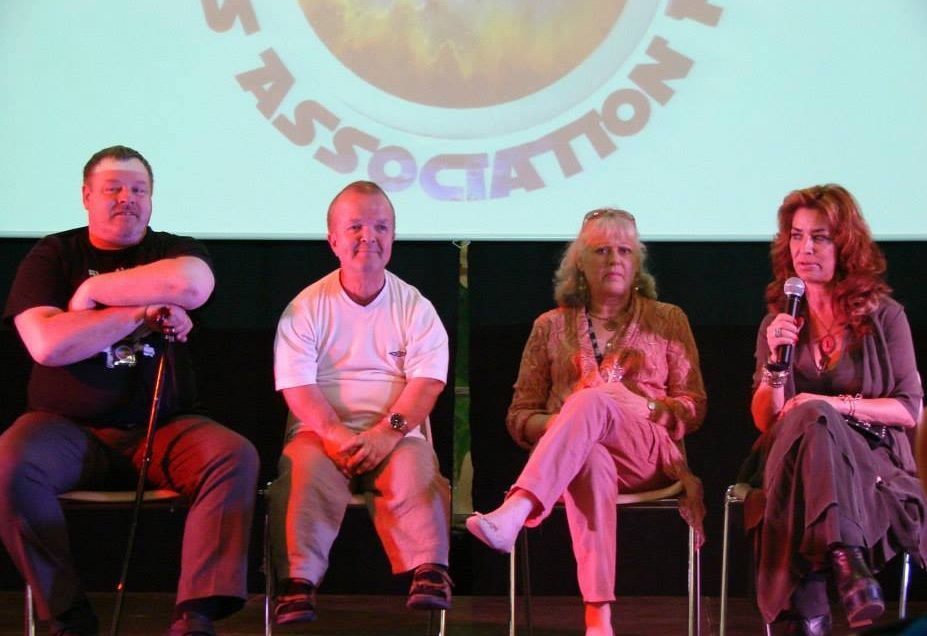
Wells (far right) in 2014

=== Return to acting ===
After a lengthy absence, Wells returned to acting in 2011 with a small role in the independent science-fiction film, Alien Armageddon.

The same year, Wells reprised her role from Back to the Future, 26 years after her last appearance in the series; she provided the voice of Jennifer Parker for Back to the Future: The Game. In 2012, Wells announced that her next project would be a horror film titled Room & Board.

== Personal life ==
When she was 15, she became a born-again Christian and her faith helped her get through her mother's cancer diagnosis and death.

Wells has a son, born circa 1995.

== Filmography ==
=== Film ===
Year	Title	Role	Notes
1985	Back to the Future	Jennifer Parker	
2008	Still Waters Burn	Laura Harper	
2011	Alien Armageddon	Eileen Daly	
2013	You Are Not Alone	Cristina's Mom	Short film
2013	Max	Mom	Short film
2014	Starship: Rising	Captain Savage	
2015	EP/Executive Protection	Pam Travis	
2015	Back in Time	Herself	Back to the Future documentary
2015	Back to the 2015 Future	Jennifer Parker	Short film
2018	Groove Street	Julie	
2018	System Failure	Mrs Henderson	Short film
2019	Vitals	Margaret Parks	

=== Television ===
Year	Title	Role	Notes
1979	Family	Denise / Barbara Collins	2 episodes
1981	Rise and Shine	Patsy D'Allisandro	1 episode
1981	Strike Force	Patty	Episode: "Magic Man"
1982	Herbie, the Love Bug	Julie MacLane	5 episodes
1982	Lovers and Other Strangers	Mary Claire Delvecchio	Television film
1984	Fame	Marya	Episode: "Appearances"
1984	Anatomy of an Illness	Sarakit	Television film
1984–1985	Off the Rack	Shannon Halloran	7 episodes
1984–1986	CBS Schoolbreak Special	Lisa / Wendy	2 episodes
1985	Trapper John, M.D.	Candy	Episode: "Long Ago and Far Away"
1985	Simon & Simon	Phoebe Glass	Episode: "Slither"
1985	Able to Do		
1986	Fast Times	Linda Barrett	7 episodes
1986	Brothers	Sarah	Episode: "Joe Leaves This Old World Behind"
2011	The Mentalist	Chief Marnie Green	Episode: "Where in the World is Carmine O'Brien?"
2014	Zero Impact Home	Future Petal	Short series
2015	The Comeback Kids	Herself	Episode: "Re-United and It Feels So Good"

=== Video games ===
Year	Title	Role	Notes
2011	Back to the Future: The Game	Jennifer Parker	Episode 3: "Citizen Brown"; Episode 4: "Double Visions"
