= Marilyn Ghigliotti =

American actress

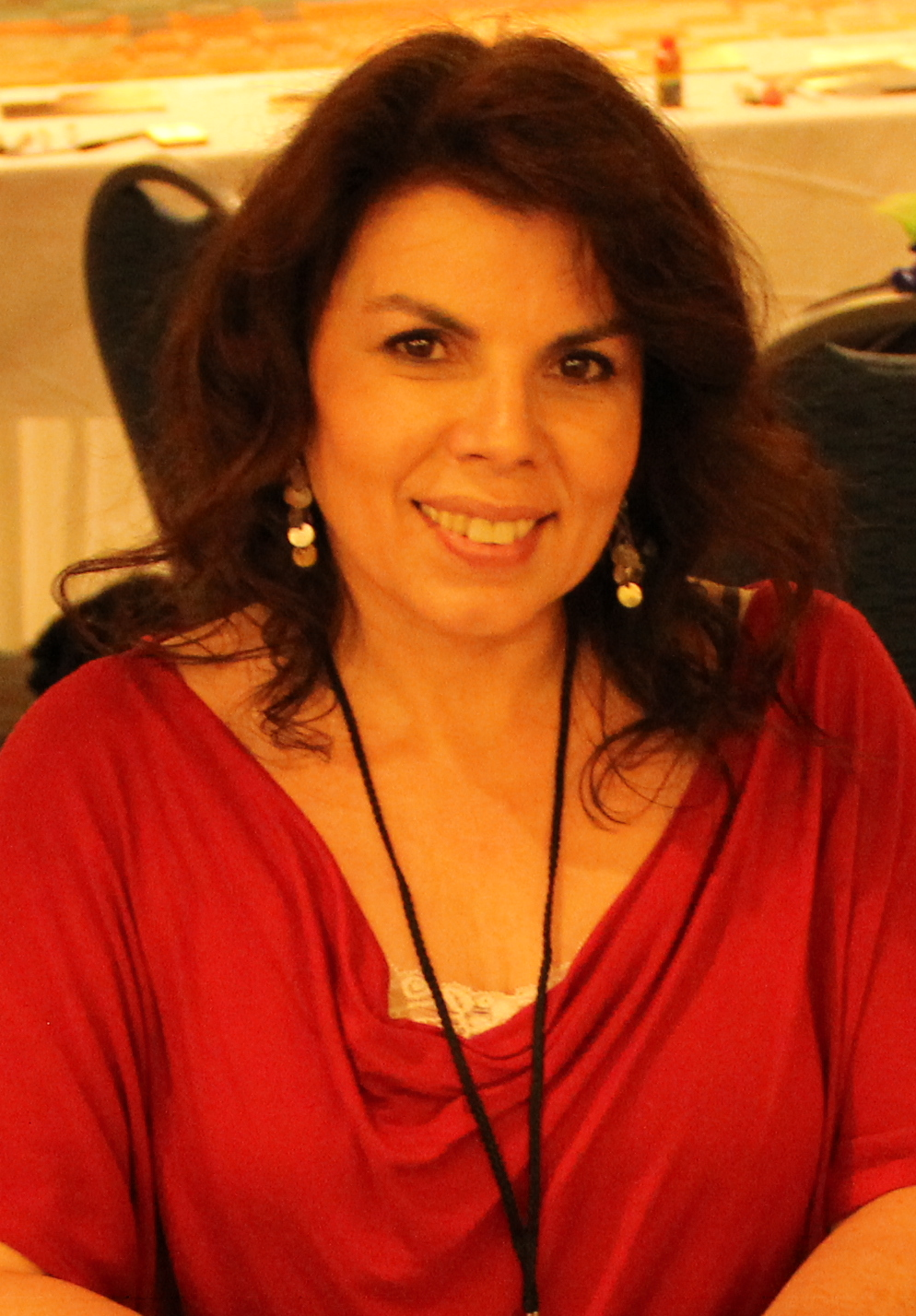
- Ghigliotti at the 2012 Florida Supercon
- Occupations: Actress, producer, director, make-up artist
- Years active: 1991–present

Marilyn Ghigliotti is an American actress, producer, director, and make-up artist best known for playing Veronica Loughran in Clerks.

== Life and career ==
Clerks director Kevin Smith cast her for her ability to cry while reciting a monologue for the audition. She later auditioned for Smith's Mallrats and was offered the role of Kim in Chasing Amy, but was not comfortable with kissing another woman on film.

== Filmography ==
=== Film ===
Year	Title	Role	Notes
1991	Invasion for Flesh and Blood	Rape Victim	Direct-to-video
1994	Clerks	Veronica Loughran	
1996	Jacker 2: Descent to Hell		Direct-to-video; uncredited
1998	Get a Job	Gina	
1998	Flesh Eaters from Outer Space		Direct-to-video
1999	A Packing Suburbia	Reporter	
2004	Palmarejo	Gigi	Short film
2004	Snowball Effect. The Story of Clerks	Herself	Documentary film
2005	5	Chloe Johnson	Short film; also makeup artist
2006	Who's Your Daddy?	Mom	Short film; also makeup artist
2006	Bad Hair Day	Maxy	Short film; also associate producer, key hair stylist
2007	Writers Do It Alone	Telanovela Woman	Short film; also makeup artist
2007	Dig	Teacher	Short film
2007	Negotiations	Female Hostage	Short film
2007	Roadkill	Alice	Direct-to-video
2008	Dead and Gone	Nurse Clark	
2008	Neland Circle	Connie	Short film
2009	The Little Samaritan	Mother	Short film; also production assistant and still photographer
2011	Alien Armageddon	Macy	also makeup artist
2013	Geek USA	Ronnie	
2014	#Rip	Lydia Walters	Short film; voice role
2014	Starship: Rising	Xarsis	
2014	Neighbors	Marta	Short film
2015	Nobody's Perfect	Mom	Short film
2016	Lake Eerie	Realtor	
2017	Rogue Warrior: Robot Fighter	Xarsis	
2019	The Green Dress	Connie	Short film
2019	Shooting Clerks	Ali Thomlyn	also associate producer, hair stylist, makeup artist, and special thanks
2019	Jay and Silent Bob Reboot	Herself	
2022	Clerks III	Veronica Loughran	
TBA	Witchula	Veronica Maleva	Post-production
TBA	Thursday the 12th	Morgan the Gypsy	Post-production
TBA	Evolution War	MedBot386	Post-production

=== Television ===
Year	Title	Role	Notes
2009	Totally Sketch	Gary's Mother	Episode: "Relaxation CD"
2014	Disorganized Zone	Jenny	Episode: "Tomorrow"
2014	Life with Kat & McKay	Estelle	Episode: "Bunco Me This!"
2014	LeagueOne: In the Spotlight!	Herself	Episode: "Marilyn Ghigliotti: Clerks Q&A"
2015-2019	Suspense	Amy Sayres / Dr. Macon / Lucy Travers / Lulu McCary / Emmaline Peck	Recurring role; 5 episodes
2016	The Grindhouse Radio	Herself	Episode: "GHR: Marilyn Ghigliotti & Stephen Vining"
2017	Astrid Clover	Robed Woman	Episode: "Video Services"

=== Producer ===
Year	Title	Notes
2019	Letter from God	Short film
2019	Unsolved	Short film

=== Director ===
Year	Title	Notes
2019	A Mother's Love	Short film; also producer
