= Emii =

American singer-songwriter

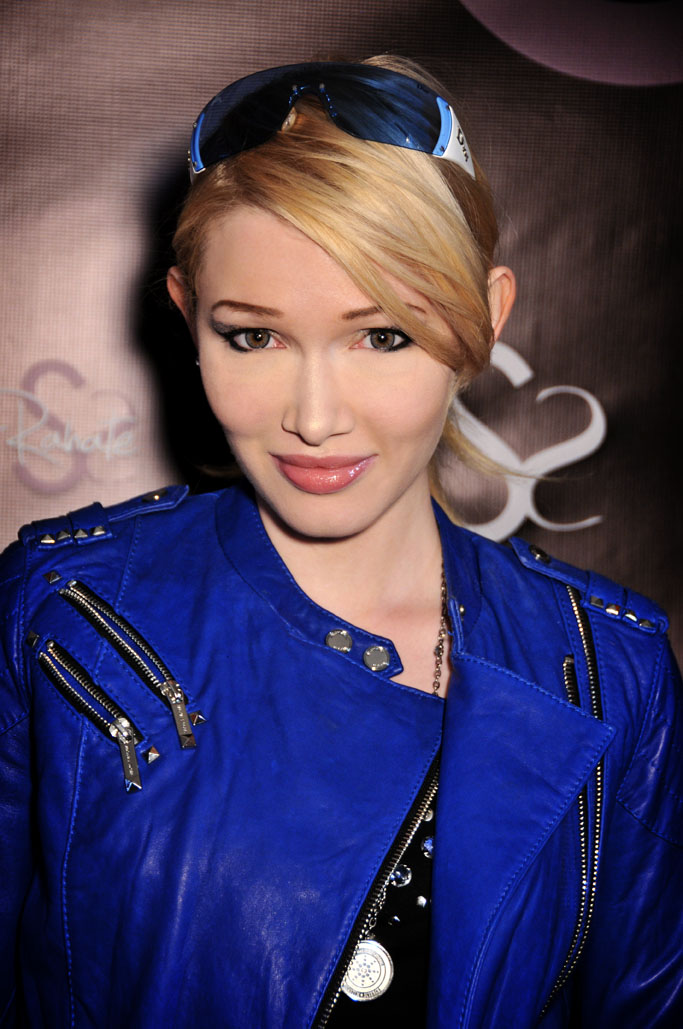
- Emii, West Hollywood, California on May 16, 2013

Background information
- Born: Emily Rose Morrison; December 4, 1984 (age 41)
- Origin: Youngstown, Ohio, United States
- Genres: Rock, pop
- Occupations: Singer, songwriter
- Instruments: Vocals, piano, guitar
- Label: Slippery Eel

Emily Rose Morrison (born December 4, 1984) known professionally as Emii, is an American singer and songwriter originally from Youngstown, Ohio.

== Biography ==
Emii was a competitor on SyFy's "Geeks Who Drink" hosted by Zachary Levi, was initially featured in the June 2013 issue of Billboard as the Spotlight Artist, and her November 2012 feature in Inked magazine highlighted her extensive martial arts background and passion for science fiction and comic books. Emii was also the first female citizen to complete five rounds of TORIS life-or-death combat training. She signed with theatrical/commercial agent Media Artists Group after starring in two sci-fi feature films at the tail end of 2012.

Emii's first hit single "Magic", which was released on April 6, 2010, reached #32 on The Pop Indicator Chart and held the #66 position on the R&R/Mediabase Top 40 Pop Chart. The music video for "Magic" was the most viewed music-related video on YouTube on the day of its release and the sixth most viewed video overall. After performing in Beirut for the NRJ Music Tour with Flo Rida, Iyaz, and Inna, for her first major audience of 25,000 fans, Emii met DJ Osane and the two collaborated on the hit song "Emergency" which was called a "club smash" by Rolling Stone magazine. Her song "Magic" is featured in the YouTube television show Dance On. YouTube star Hannah Hart of My Drunk Kitchen fame learns to dance to the song from So You Think You Can Dance winner Lauren Froderman.

Emii then released a five-song EP Magic on iTunes . On October 26, 2010, Emii released her follow-up single, "Mr. Romeo" featuring rapper Snoop Dogg. She accompanied the release with a collection of remixes, including mixes by critically acclaimed DJs Seamus Haji and Mike Rizzo. A music video for "Mr. Romeo" featuring Snoop Dogg was released January 2011 and hit over 1,000,000 views on YouTube.

Emii's follow-up EP, "Time To Move On" was awarded three stars in a Rolling Stone Magazine review. "Time To Move On" reached #4 on the UK Pop Club Music Chart, in June 2013. Her science fiction-themed music video for "Freakier Freak" premiered on the gaming and Sci-Fi website IGN April 2, 2013 and her 2014 summertime single "Fiesta" reached #67 on the Mediabase Top 40 Pop charts and was #32 on the BDS Pop Indicator Charts.

Emii's 2014 fall single, “Leaving You Behind”, landed her in the Top 5 Most Active Independent Artists on both the Top 40 and A/C Mediabase Charts for a total of twenty-two consecutive weeks, hitting #29 on the BDS A/C Indicator Chart. Her music video for "Leaving You Behind", released on January 21, 2015, is the empowering story of a young woman who escapes an all too common domestic abuse situation in hopes of taking control of her own destiny. The stunt-laden video brings together a team of experts with credits in some of Hollywood's biggest films and television shows including Twilight (Mitch Gould), Batman v Superman, Man of Steel, Thor: The Dark World (Wayne Dalglish), and The Amazing Spiderman (Danielle Burgio). Following the release of "Leaving You Behind", Emii became an official ambassador for No More, a non-profit organization dedicated to raising public awareness in an effort to end domestic violence.

As of August 2015, Emii's new song "Heart in a Box" is rising up the Top 40 Mediabase radio charts, currently in the top 100. She is the 3rd most active independent artist on US Top 40 radio. On June 17, 2015, she released a "Heart in the Box - Remixes" compilation on iTunes featuring DJ Mike D, Peter Antal (Euro Mix), and club-favorite Danny Olsen. In July 2015 "Heart in a Box" reached #7 on the Billboard Hot Singles sales charts.

Emii is also an avid gamer, and a known fan of Marvel Comics and science fiction. She was featured on Marvel.com in March 2013 after touring the New York City Headquarters with Editor Ryan Penagos and staff. In May 2015 she was featured in Vogue as a Leading Lady of Star Wars, following her appearance at Star Wars Celebration in Anaheim, CA.

== Personal life ==
She currently lives in Los Angeles, California.

== Discography ==
=== Extended plays ===
- Magic EP (2010)
- Mr. Romeo EP (2011)
- Time To Move On + Freakier Freak (2013)
- Heart in a Box (2015)

=== Singles ===
- 2010: "Magic"
- 2011: "Mr. Romeo" (featuring Snoop Dogg)
- 2011: "Zombie Boyfriend"
- 2011: "Stilettos"
- 2012: "Emergency"
- 2013: "Freakier Freak + Time To Move On"
- 2014: "Fiesta"
- 2014: "Leaving You Behind"
- 2015: "Heart in a Box"
- 2015: "Heart in a Box: The Remixes"
- 2016: "Wait"
