= Remember Me? (film) =

1997 comedy film by Nick Hurran

- VHS cover
- Directed by: Nick Hurran
- Written by: Michael Frayn
- Screenplay by: Michael Frayn
- Produced by: Alan Shallcross; Alan Wright
- Starring: Imelda Staunton; Robert Lindsay; Natalie Walter; Rik Mayall; Tim Matthews; Emily Bruni; Razaaq Adoti; Olegar Fedoro
- Cinematography: David Odd
- Edited by: John Wilson
- Music by: Michael Kamen; Edward Shearmur
- Production company: Ealing Studios
- Distributed by: FilmFour Distributors
- Release date: 28 July 1997
- Running time: 81 minutes
- Country: United Kingdom
- Language: English
- Budget: £3 million

Remember Me? (stylized in uppercase) is a 1997 British comedy film directed by Nick Hurran and written by Michael Frayn. It is produced by Alan Shallcross and Alan Wright. The directorial debut of Hurran, it stars Imelda Staunton and Robert Lindsay. It is distributed by Film4 Productions (FilmFour Distributiors), and follows a married couple who become upset after an ex-partner arrives.

Production began in the Spring of 1996, set with a 3 million pound budget. The film was inspired by a teleplay released in the 1960's by Frayn. The film's production was completed in April 1997 and was subsequently released in the United Kingdom in July 1997, with a few screenings being shown earlier. A VHS release was also released later that day. The film later received mixed reviews from critics.

== Plot ==
Married couple Lorna (Imelda Staunton) and Ian (Rik Mayall) are living in the suburbs with their kids Jessica and Mark. Lorna is a struggling author, while Ian is unemployed looking for a job. And Jessica's boyfriend Chas (Razaaq Adoti) is a theif. One day, Lorna's ex-partner, Jamie (Robert Lindsay), a businessman, arrives at the couple's house looking for an apparent wallet. It later turns into Jamie and his girlfriend Georgina (Natalie Walter) having dinner at the couple's house. Lorna's feelings slowly rekindle over the film.

== Cast ==
- Imelda Staunton as Lorna, a married woman
- Robert Lindsay as Jamie, a businessman and the ex-partner of Lorna
- Natalie Walter as Georgina, the girlfriend of Jamie
- Rik Mayall as Ian, a married man
- Tim Matthews as Mark, the son of Ian and Lorna
- Emily Bruni as Jessica, the daughter of Ian and Lorna
- Razaaq Adoti as Chas, the boyfriend of Jessica
- Olegar Fedoro as Gangster, a gangster driver

== Production ==
The film was highly inspired by Jamie, on a Flying Visit (1968), a 1960's BBC teleplay, written by Michael Frayn. A budget was set with £3 million. According to Alan Titchmarsh, the film began production in Spring of 1996. The production was completed in April 1997.

The film was directed by Nick Hurran, and was also written by Frayn. Alan Shallcross and Alan Wright produced the film as well. The music was composed by Michael Kamen and Edward Shearmur. David Odd was credited with cinematography, and John Wilson was credited as editor. The plot was later re-used for Hurran's next film Girls' Night (1998).

=== Release ===
The film was released on 28 July 1997. Prior to its release, it had screenings at the National Film Theatre and the Century Preview Theater on 18 July. VHS rentals were later released the same day.

== Reception ==
The film received mixed reviews from film critics. On Rotten Tomatoes, it showed two green splats out of five. Derek Elley from Variety states that the film "has actors that get a good workout", while also applauding Rik Mayall for its acting. Ryan Gilbey from The Independent applauded Frayn for his writing for the film.

Other reviews were criticizing the plot, and its pace. Quenten Falk from the Sunday Mirror stated that the film was "frenzied" and was deemed to be unfunny. Matthew Sweet from The Independent criticized the plot and its length.
