= Phoebe Thomas =

British actress

- Born: Phoebe Thomas; 12 April 1983 (age 43)

Phoebe Thomas (born 12 April 1983) is a British actress. Thomas made a name for herself playing Holly Curran on Night and Day from 2001 to 2003. In 2005 she went on to star in the Five soap, Family Affairs, as homeless Jane Hughes. She has also had a role in Channel 4 comedy Teachers and played nurse Maria Kendall in BBC medical drama Holby City from 28 November 2006 to 19 May 2010. She is also playing Hetty Feather in the stage adaptation of Hetty Feather. She was "Thea Holmes" in Death in Paradise Series 3 Episode 2 (The Wrong Man).

She has previously acted the role of Lady Godiva in an independent film based on a script by Vicky Jewson.

== Filmography ==
=== Film ===
Year	Film	Role	Notes
1999	Tube Tales	Becky	
2007	Permanent Vacation	Sally Bury	
2008	Lady Godiva	Jemima Honey / 21st Century Lady Godiva	
2009	Esther's		Short

=== Television ===
Year	Film	Role	Notes
2001	Teachers	Cheryl	Guest role (series 1)
2001–2003	Night & Day	Holly Curran	Main role
2003	The Bill	Chloe	"173: Pandora's Box"
2003	Doctors	Kerry Lynch	"When the Bough Breaks"
2003	Holby City	Chloe Palmer	"The Parent Trap", "A Friend in Need"
2004	As If	Girl With Dog	"Sasha's POV"
2005	Judge John Deed	Reb Spark	"Above the Law"
2005	Family Affairs	Jane Hughes	"1.2154", "1.2156"
2005	The Booze Cruise II: The Treasure Hunt	Sally	TV film
2006	Sea of Souls	Chloe	"Sleeper"
2006	The Inspector Lynley Mysteries	Clare Simmons	"In the Blink of an Eye"
2006–2010	Holby City	Maria Kendall	Regular role (series 9–12)
2007	Little Devil	Jackie Crowe	TV miniseries
2011	Doctors	Sonia Bayliss	"Gotcha!"
2014	Death in Paradise	Thea	"The Wrong Man"
2014	Outnumbered	Melissa	"Communication Skills"
2014	Vera	Nicky	"Protected"
2015	The Coroner	Dora Horton	"How to Catch a Lobster"
2018	Doctors	Antonia Brandon	"Promise the Moon"
