= Avantika (actress) =

American actress (born 2005)

- Born: Avantika Vandanapu; January 25, 2005 (age 21); Union City, California, United States
- Education: Columbia University
- Occupation: Actress
- Years active: 2015–present
- Website: iamavantika.com

Avantika Vandanapu (/əˈvɑːntɪkə/ ə-VAHN-ti-kə; Telugu: [avan̪t̪ika ʋan̪d̪anapu]; born January 25, 2005), known mononymously as Avantika, is an Indian American actress.

She began her career with the 2016 Telugu film Brahmotsavam and later took on several other projects within Telugu cinema. Moving to American cinema, she starred in the Disney Channel original movie Spin (2021), then in Netflix's Senior Year (2022). She gained recognition with supporting roles in the musical comedy Mean Girls and horror film Tarot (both 2024) and has since led Mindy Kaling's comedy series Not Suitable for Work (2026).

== Early and personal life ==
Avantika Vandanapu was born to a Telugu family in Union City, California, in the San Francisco Bay Area, on January 25, 2005. Her family lived in Hyderabad, Telangana, India, before they emigrated to the United States. She took drama lessons at the American Conservatory Theater.

As of 2026, Avantika lives in New York City, where she attends Columbia University as a member of the class of 2027.

== Career ==
=== Indian cinema (2014–2016) ===
In 2014, Avantika won second place in the Zee TV dance competition reality series Dance India Dance L'il Masters (North America Edition).

Avantika entered Telugu cinema in 2015 and was signed for two movies. She was selected to play the role of Chutki in 14 Reels Entertainment's Krishna Gaadi Veera Prema Gaadha (2016), but scheduling conflicts forced her to leave during production. Avantika officially debuted as a child artist in Brahmotsavam (2016) starring Mahesh Babu. She then appeared in Chandra Shekhar Yeleti's film Manamantha. Later, she signed on for Premam starring Naga Chaitanya and Shruti Hassan, in which she portrayed the younger version of Madonna Sebastian's character. Avantika said she left Telugu cinema largely because she was mainly asked to play the younger character of the female lead or supporting roles.

=== American cinema (2021–present) ===
In 2021, Avantika debuted in American cinema by playing the lead role of Rhea Kumar, a headstrong high school student with aspirations of becoming a DJ in the Disney Channel Original Movie Spin. The film, along with her performance, had a positive reception from Udita Jhunjhunwala of Firstpost who wrote of her "sparkling eyes, as she glides through the restaurant with as much ease as she finds her groove behind the mixing console". She followed this with supporting roles in the unremarkable Netflix original films Moxie (2021) and Senior Year (2022).

In 2024, Avantika portrayed Karen Shetty in the film adaptation of the Broadway musical Mean Girls, based on the 2004 movie of the same name. She had to take a "temporary leave of absence" from university to accommodate the timings required for shooting. Avantika discussed the change in Karen's ethnicity from the original film, stating that "playing that kind of character, especially as an Indian American woman, is really, really crazy" and was "excited to finally play a South Asian character that wasn’t reduced to being a stereotype". The film had an ambivalent reception from critics but her performance was well-received. Writing for The Guardian, Peter Bradshaw commended Avantika as "the standout amongst the mean girls". Mean Girls emerged as a commercial success, which led to The Times of India crediting the film with helping establish her presence in American cinema.

She returned to Indian projects with the Amazon Prime Video original series Big Girls Don't Cry. She portrayed Ludo, a closeted lesbian struggling to retain her basketball captaincy while coming to terms with her sexuality. In a mixed review for Film Companion, Rahul Desai said the sheer number of characters in the series make it difficult to focus on each one's storyline, but praised the chemistry and performances of the cast. The following month, Avantika appeared in an ensemble in the Anna Halberg and Spenser Cohen-helmed horror film Tarot. Her decision to take the role was influenced by her mother's belief in astrology and her own early interest in the occult, as the film combined both themes. Reception to the film was generally negative; in her review for Collider, Emma Kiely felt that Avantika's performance had been constrained by the film's poor writing as she "isn't given enough to do". Made on a shoestring-budget, Tarot emerged as a major commercial success.

Following a special appearance in the song "I Am A Champion" for the Telugu film Champion (2025), Avantika starred amongst an ensemble in Vicky Jewson's action thriller film Pretty Lethal that follows a ballet troupe that are held captive by a Hungarian gang. It was panned by critics. In 2026, she featured as an aspiring celebrity stylist in Mindy Kaling's comedy series Not Suitable for Work, for Hulu. In a negative review of the series for RogerEbert.com, Nick Allen found that the actress was "practically gasping for more to do" in a thinly-written role and considered it a downgrade from her work in Mean Girls. Avantika is next set to headline the Disney+ original series A Crown of Wishes, based on the 2017 novel of the same name by Roshani Chokshi.

== Filmography ==
=== Film ===
Key
†	Denotes films that have not yet been released

Year	Film	Role	Language	Notes	Ref.
2016	Brahmotsavam	Babu's cousin	Telugu	Debut as Child actress	
2016	Manamantha	Swathi	Telugu		
2016	Premam	Young Sindhu	Telugu		
2017	Babu Baga Busy	Anitha	Telugu		
2017	Rarandoi Veduka Chudham	Young Bhramarambha	Telugu		
2017	Balakrishnudu	Young Aadhya	Telugu		
2017	Oxygen	Avantika	Telugu		
2018	Agnyaathavaasi	Sampath's daughter	Telugu		
2021	Spin	Rhea Kumar	English	English Debut as Child Lead Actress	
2021	Boomika	Boomika	Tamil	Tamil Debut as Child Lead Actress	
2021	Moxie	Chem Class Girl	English	Credited as Avantika Vandanapu	
2022	Senior Year	Janet Singh	English		
2024	Mean Girls	Karen Shetty	English		
2024	Tarot	Paige	English		
2025	Champion	Dayana	Telugu	Special appearance in the song "I Am A Champion"	
2026	Pretty Lethal	Grace	English		

=== Television ===
Key
†	Denotes television productions that have not yet been released

Year	Series	Role	Notes	Ref.
2014	Dance India Dance L'il Masters (North America Edition)	Herself	Contestant	
2018	The Talent Show	Herself	Contestant	
2023	Hell's Kitchen	Herself	Guest diner/Teen Cancer America contributor; Episode: A Hellish Food Fight	
2026	Not Suitable for Work	Abhinaya 'Abby' Chilukuri	Main role	
2026	American Horror Story: 13	Ophelia	Recurring role; 5 episodes	

=== Web series ===
Year	Series	Role	Language	Network	Notes	Ref.
2020	Diary of a Future President	Monyca	English	Disney+	season one	
2022	The Sex Lives of College Girls	Priya	English	HBO Max	Guest role	
2024	Big Girls Don't Cry	Leah "Ludo" Joseph	English	Amazon Prime Video	Main cast	
TBA	A Crown of Wishes	Princess Gauri	English	Disney+	Main cast; also executive producer	

=== Voice roles ===
Year	Series	Role	Language	Network	Notes	Ref.
2019	Mickey Mouse Mixed-Up Adventures	Sareena Tapoor	English	Disney Jr		
2020	Mira, Royal Detective	Kamala	English	Disney Jr		
2025	Cartoonified with Phineas and Ferb	Herself	English	Disney Channel	Episode: "Avantika"	

=== Music videos ===
Year	Title	Artist
2026	"2000s Pop Punk Rnb"	Whatmore
