= The Celebrity Apprentice (British TV series) =

- Also known as: Comic Relief Does The Apprentice for Comic Relief; Sport Relief Does The Apprentice; The Celebrity Apprentice for Comic Relief
- Genre: Reality television
- Created by: Mark Burnett
- Starring: Alan Sugar
- Country of origin: United Kingdom
- Original language: English
- No. of series: 5
- No. of episodes: 10

Production
- Running time: 60 minutes 30 minutes (2019, "The Boardroom")
- Production companies: talkbackTHAMES; Mark Burnett Productions

Original release
- Network: BBC One
- Release: 15 March 2007 – 13 March 2009
- Release: 7 March – 8 March 2019
- Release: 29 December 2025 – present

Related
- The Apprentice; Comic Relief

The Celebrity Apprentice (also known as Comic Relief Does The Apprentice, Sport Relief Does The Apprentice and The Celebrity Apprentice for Comic Relief) is a special celebrity version of British reality television series The Apprentice, initially produced to raise money for Comic Relief.

Each of the specials involves two teams of celebrities competing in a single Apprentice task. The first edition aired in March 2007. In 2008, the same format was broadcast under the title Sport Relief Does The Apprentice. Further editions in aid of Comic Relief were aired in 2009 and 2019. The Celebrity Apprentice was first aired in December 2025 as a Christmas special with a full series airing in 2026.

Prior to the show airing in 2007, it was spoofed in the television programme Kombat Opera Presents The Applicants.

== Comic Relief Does The Apprentice ==
=== Series 1 (2007) ===
The series first aired on BBC One on 15 March 2007 and concluded on 16 March 2007 during the main Comic Relief programme The first episode of the show received strong viewing figures of 6.72 million. It became the fifth most watched programme on BBC One that week.

==== Men's team ====
Candidate	Known for
Danny Baker	Broadcaster
Alastair Campbell – Project Manager	Journalist, former government press officer
Rupert Everett	Actor (resigned after one day – replaced by first Apprentice winner Tim Campbell)
Ross Kemp	Actor
Piers Morgan – Fired	Former newspaper editor turned broadcaster, journalist

==== Women's team – winners ====
Candidate	Known for
Karren Brady – Project Manager	Businesswoman
Jo Brand	Comedian
Cheryl Cole	Girls Aloud
Maureen Lipman	Actress, comedian and columnist
Trinny Woodall	Fashion guru and television presenter

==== Performance chart ====
Task Number
Candidate	1
Alastair	LOSE
Cheryl	IN
Danny	BR
Jo	IN
Karren	WIN
Maureen	IN
Ross	LOSS
Tim	LOSS
Trinny	IN
Piers	FIRED
Rupert	LEFT

WIN The candidate won as project manager on their team, for this task.
LOSE The candidate lost as project manager on their team, for this task.
IN The candidate was on the winning team for this task
LOSS The candidate was on the losing team for this task.
BR The candidate was brought to the final boardroom for this task.
FIRED The candidate was fired in this task.
FIRED The candidate lost as project manager for this task and was fired.
LEFT The candidate left the process.

==== Results ====
The women won in the categories "ticket sales" and "food and drinks", as well as claiming the overall win in terms of total money raised, while the men managed to pull off a victory in the "rides" category. Together, the teams raised over a million pounds for charity.

	Men's Team	Women's Team	Both teams
Ticket sales	£180,830	£662,325	£843,155
Rides	£96,876	£71,347	£168,223
Food and drinks	£8,550	£41,327.50	£49,788.50
Total	£286,256	£774,998.50	£1,061,254.50

Everett walked off the show during filming on the first day, as he was uncomfortable with the Big Brother style experience. He was replaced by the first UK Apprentice Tim Campbell. Radio host Chris Moyles was asked to appear as a contestant, but declined the offer.

==== Overview ====
The task allocated during the show was to run a funfair. The team which produced the most money for Comic Relief via ticket, food, and ride sales would win. The teams were then gathered at Alan Sugar's office and briefed on the task ahead. The girls chose Karren Brady as their team leader, and the boys chose Alastair Campbell.

The celebrities were then given a list of all rides and attractions that would be offered at the funfair, leaving the teams to bargain over who would get which rides. The teams then called and visited celebrities to sell tickets and gain donations. The largest donation for a ticket was £150,000 from a friend of Trinny Woodall.

Celebrities who attended the funfair and donated money included Simon Cowell, McFly, Ashley Cole, Anne Robinson, Tracey Emin, Chris Evans, David Furnish, Peter Stringfellow, Girls Aloud, Geri Halliwell, Take That, Jesse Metcalfe and John Terry.

In the end, both teams raised a total of over £1 million for Comic Relief. The girls' team won the competition by raising £774,000 compared to the boys' £286,000. As a result of the girls' team winning, Danny Baker, Piers Morgan, and the boys' team leader Alastair Campbell were put forward to potentially be fired by Sir Alan Sugar. In a heated exchange, Alastair Campbell and Piers Morgan blamed each other for their failure at the task. Sir Alan Sugar decided that Piers Morgan was more at fault due to his "winding people up" with his "demeanor" and consequently 'fired' him.

Jo Brand commented on The Graham Norton Show after the airing of the programme that "Trinny Woodall knows everyone in Belgravia who earns more than £10 million a year so she got on the phone and the rest of us just went to the pub, it was great!".

=== Series 2 (2009) ===
A second series of Comic Relief Does The Apprentice was aired on 12 and 13 March 2009. The first episode received 7.94 million viewers, with a 33% audience share.

==== Men's team ====
Candidate	Known for
Alan Carr – fired	Comedian
Jack Dee	Comedian
Gerald Ratner – Project Manager	Businessman
Jonathan Ross	TV and radio presenter
Gok Wan	Style guru

==== Women's Team – Winners ====
Candidate	Known for
Michelle Mone – Project Manager	Businesswoman
Patsy Palmer	Actress
Fiona Phillips	TV presenter
Carol Vorderman	TV presenter
Ruby Wax	Comedian

The show was filmed in late 2008. Jonathan Ross had been suspended by the BBC for three months for his part in the telephone pranks on Andrew Sachs' regarding Sachs' granddaughter in October and had been forbidden to film anything during that time, however since he had previously agreed and since it was for charity, the BBC allowed him to participate.

Sugar expressed disappointment about his portrayal in the BBC trailer for the programme, telling the Daily Mirror, "The idiot that edited it [...] went through the past five years of archive to find snapshots of me roaring like a deranged lunatic and just stuck them all together." He threatened to quit the series if it happened again.

==== Performance chart ====
Task Number
Candidate	1
Carol	IN
Fiona	IN
Gerald	LOSE
Gok	LOSS
Jack	BR
Jonathan	LOSS
Michelle	WIN
Patsy	IN
Ruby	IN
Alan	FIRED

WIN The candidate won as project manager on their team, for this task.
LOSE The candidate lost as project manager on their team, for this task.
IN The candidate was on the winning team for this task
LOSS The candidate was on the losing team for this task.
BR The candidate was brought to the final boardroom for this task.
FIRED The candidate was fired in this task.
FIRED The candidate lost as project manager for this task and was fired.

==== Overview ====
The task was to create a toy and market it at a show attended by Sir Alan and toy industry representatives, with the potential for it to be mass-produced and sold to raise money for Comic Relief. The men's team, led by Gerald Ratner, created a belt with clip-on slots to hold collectible figurines, that was suggested by Jonathan Ross. The women's team created a velcro suit that was intended to come in pairs and played somewhat like Twister, including a giant novelty dice that when rolled, instructed players to stick one part of their body to the other player's, with the loser being whoever fell to the floor first. Both teams suffered internal conflicts, with Jonathan Ross forcing many of his ideas through and then not contributing to the speech that he was supposed to be writing with Jack Dee, while Patsy Palmer became frustrated with Michelle Mone's leadership of their team and very nearly quit. Conflict between Dee and Ross was presented by the BBC in a humorous fashion, and it is likely that both Dee and Ross 'played up' their conflict to entertain the viewer.

The men's presentation was felt to be better, and Sir Alan told the girls that their product suffered from a myriad of small flaws such as the dice being largely needless, and the suits being in blue and pink when children often prefer to play among their own gender (although the girls pointed out that the prototyping company had made that decision without consulting their team). However, it was pointed out that the collectables for the men's belt would have such high initial production costs that it would require a significant manufacturing lead time and would take an even longer time for the product to generate any profits (and thereby money for Comic Relief), meaning that while the men's execution of their task may have been better than the women's, and their product may have been the better of the two if it were being judged on a purely business basis, as a charity product it was completely worthless for Comic Relief's purposes, meaning that they lost the task. The women's team were "rewarded" by not having to work for Sir Alan any more (and, since this was the final Apprentice charity special, it meant the women's teams had a 100% victory rate across all three editions).

As the men's team lost the contest, one of them was going to be fired by Sir Alan. As project manager, Ratner had to choose 2 of his team to join him in the boardroom to face the board. Ratner decided that Wan and Ross had made the greatest contribution to the team and so should not face the sack. During the deliberations in the board room, Jack Dee attempted to convince Sir Alan to fire his advisor Nick Hewer on the comical grounds that Nick had contributed nothing, and had taken money from Dee and bribed him. While Ratner was heavily criticised for allowing Ross to take over the entire task and bringing Dee back instead of him, Alan Carr was eventually fired by Sir Alan, who felt that Carr had been the least effective contributor to the task and said he was doing Alan a favour by saving him from the miserable atmosphere of the boardroom.

=== Series 3 (2019) ===
On 22 February 2019, it was announced that Comic Relief Does The Apprentice would return after a ten-year hiatus. Two episodes, The Cabaret Task and The Boardroom, aired on the 7 and 8 March 2019 respectively.

==== Men's team ====
Candidate	Known for
Omid Djalili – Fired	Actor & comedian
Richard Arnold	Television presenter
Russell Kane	Comedian
Rylan Clark-Neal – Project Manager	Television presenter
Sam Allardyce	Football manager

==== Women's team – winners ====
Candidate	Known for
Amanda Holden	Britain's Got Talent judge, television presenter & actress
Ayda Field	The X Factor judge & actress
Kelly Hoppen – Project Manager	Dragons' Den star
Rachel Johnson	Journalist, author & television presenter
Tameka Empson	EastEnders actress

==== Performance chart ====
Task Number
Candidate	1
Amanda	IN
Ayda	IN
Kelly	WIN
Rachel	IN
Richard	LOSS
Russell	LOSS
Rylan	LOSE
Sam	BR
Tameka	IN
Omid	FIRED

WIN The candidate won as project manager on their team, for this task.
LOSE The candidate lost as project manager on their team, for this task.
IN The candidate was on the winning team for this task
LOSS The candidate was on the losing team for this task.
BR The candidate was brought to the final boardroom for this task.
FIRED The candidate was fired in this task.
FIRED The candidate lost as project manager for this task and was fired.

== Sport Relief Does The Apprentice (2008) ==
A Sport Relief edition aired on BBC One on 12 and 14 March 2008.

=== Women's team – winners ===
Candidate	Known for
Kirstie Allsopp	Presenter
Clare Balding	Sports presenter and journalist
Jacqueline Gold – Project Manager	Businesswoman
Louise Redknapp	Singer and TV presenter
Lisa Snowdon	Supermodel, actress, presenter and singer

=== Men's team ===
Candidate	Known for
Nick Hancock	Actor, comedian and TV presenter
Hardeep Singh Kohli	Writer, presenter and broadcaster
Kelvin MacKenzie	Media executive and former newspaper editor
Lembit Öpik – Project Manager	Politician
Phil Tufnell	Former cricketer turned broadcaster

=== Performance chart ===
Task Number
Candidate	1
Clare	IN
Jacqueline	WIN
Kelvin	BR
Kirstie	IN
Lembit	LOSE
Lisa	IN
Louise	IN
Nick	LOSS
Phil	LOSS
Hardeep	FIRED

WIN The candidate won as project manager on their team, for this task.
LOSE The candidate lost as project manager on their team, for this task.
IN The candidate was on the winning team for this task
LOSS The candidate was on the losing team for this task.
BR The candidate was brought to the final boardroom for this task.
FIRED The candidate was fired in this task.
FIRED The candidate lost as project manager for this task and was fired.

=== Overview ===
- Women: Jacqueline Gold (Project Manager), Kirstie Allsopp, Clare Balding, Louise Redknapp, Lisa Snowdon.
- Men: Lembit Öpik (Project Manager), Hardeep Singh Kohli ~~(Project Manager)~~, Nick Hancock, Kelvin MacKenzie, Phil Tufnell.
- Result: The women's team worked together efficiently and harmoniously for the most part, though Kirstie Allsopp stormed out of a planning session on the first night, feeling that project manager Jacqueline Gold was not properly exploiting Kirstie's contacts list. By contrast, the men's team was in complete chaos for most of the task. Hardeep Singh Kohli initially voltuneered to lead the men, but after half an hour the other men began complaining about his overly autocratic leadership style, and when Kelvin MacKenzie off-handedly told him that "You're not flamin' Hitler," Hardeep flew into a rage, demanded that filming be stopped and threatened to walk off the show. He ultimately agreed to stay, but refused to continue as project manager and was replaced by Lembit Öpik. By the end of the first day of the task, the women already had over £100,000 pledged to their team, but the men had no pledges whatsoever. By the final day it looked as if the men were heading for a humiliating defeat, as the women continued to secure large donations, while the men had earned very little. Near the end of the day the men were given a last-gasp chance at victory, as Kelvin's contact, Tamara Ecclestone persuaded her father Bernie Ecclestone to attend their event, and he made the biggest donation earned by either of the teams. Unfortunately for the men, the gap was too big to make up and they ended up with £316,013, while the women made £412,121, winning them the task.
- Winner: The women's team
- Brought into the boardroom: Lembit Öpik, Kelvin MacKenzie and Hardeep Singh Kohli
- Fired: Hardeep Singh Kohli – for quitting as project manager early in the task, which plunged the men's team into a state of disarray that they were never able to recover from. In addition, he was also judged to have been difficult to work with after stepping down, and brought in the least amount of money in the task.
- Notes:
  - Despite claiming that Nick Hancock and Phil Tufnell had spent most of the day joking around with each other and hadn't brought much in, Lembit Öpik decided to bring back Hardeep Singh Kohli and Kelvin MacKenzie, largely due to their argument on the first day. While Sir Alan did not feel that Lembit had been an especially good project manager, he conceded that the task would likely have ended up in an even worse failure with anyone else leading the men.
  - Kelvin MacKenzie was heavily criticised for his part in sending the team into so much chaos on the first day of the task, and also accused of taking a backseat considering he should have had the biggest contacts list of the celebrities.

== The Celebrity Apprentice (2025–present) ==
=== Christmas Special (2025) ===
The Celebrity Apprentice specials aired on 29 and 30 December 2025. The cast of 12 celebrities competing in the series was announced in November 2025. In the two-part Christmas special, the celebrity candidates were split into two groups and sent to Lapland to develop their own gingerbread biscuits. For the first time in Celebrity Apprentice history, the teams were split into mixed gender teams. The celebrities were raising money towards Children in Need.

==== Team 1 ====
Candidate	Known for
AJ Odudu	Television presenter
Charlie Hedges	BBC Radio 1 presenter
Eddie Kadi	Comedian & BBC Radio 1Xtra presenter
Jake Wood	EastEnders actor
Judge Rinder – Project Manager	Criminal law barrister & television personality
Kadeena Cox	Paralympic athlete & cyclist

==== Team 2 ====
Candidate	Known for
Angela Scanlon	Television presenter
JB Gill – Project Manager	JLS singer & television presenter
Matt Morsia	Gladiators star
Sarah Hadland	Stage & screen actress
Shazia Mirza	Stand-up comedian
Thomas Skinner	Series 15 contestant & businessman

==== Performance chart ====
Task Number
Candidate	1
AJ	LOSS
Angela	IN
Charlie	LOSS
Eddie	LOSS
Jake	BR
JB	WIN
Kadeena	BR
Matt	IN
Sarah	IN
Shazia	IN
Thomas	IN
Judge Rinder	FIRED

WIN The candidate won as project manager on their team, for this task.
LOSE The candidate lost as project manager on their team, for this task.
IN The candidate was on the winning team for this task
LOSS The candidate was on the losing team for this task.
BR The candidate was brought to the final boardroom for this task.
FIRED The candidate was fired in this task.
FIRED The candidate lost as project manager for this task and was fired.

=== Series 1 (2027) ===
Following the announcement of the Christmas Special the previous year, it was announced that The Celebrity Apprentice would air its first full length series in 2026, consisting of six episodes. The winner of the series will receive a £100,000 donation to a charity of their choice. In October 2026, it was reported that the series had been delayed and would now be aired sometime in early 2027.

==== Candidates ====
The twelve candidates competing in the first series of The Celebrity Apprentice were announced on 19 April 2026.

Candidate	Known for	Result
Alexandra Burke	Singer-songwriter & actress	
Danny Miller	Emmerdale actor	
DJ Spoony	DJ & radio presenter	
Gethin Jones	Television presenter	
Jordan Banjo	Diversity dancer & presenter	
Kay Burley	Former Sky News presenter	
Laura Smyth	Stand-up comedian	
Maddie Grace Jepson	Social media personality & actress	
Max Balegde	Social media personality	
Richie Anderson	Television & radio presenter	
Sheli McCoy	Gladiators star & weightlifter	
Toni Laites	Love Island winner	

==== Performance chart ====
Task Number
Candidate	1	2	3	4	5	6
Alexandra						
Danny						
DJ Spoony						
Gethin						
Jordan						
Kay						
Laura						
Maddie						
Max						
Richie						
Sheli						
Toni						

WIN The candidate won as project manager on their team, for this task.
LOSE The candidate lost as project manager on their team, for this task.
IN The candidate was on the winning team for this task
LOSS The candidate was on the losing team for this task.
BR The candidate was brought to the final boardroom for this task.
FIRED The candidate was fired in this task.
FIRED The candidate lost as project manager for this task and was fired.

== See also ==
- The Apprentice
- Comic Relief
- Comic Relief Does Fame Academy
