= Pretty Lethal =

2026 film by Vicky Jewson

- Release poster
- Directed by: Vicky Jewson
- Written by: Kate Freund
- Produced by: Kelly McCormick; Mike Karz; William Bindley; Piers Tempest
- Starring: Iris Apatow; Lana Condor; Millicent Simmonds; Avantika; Maddie Ziegler; Uma Thurman
- Cinematography: Bridger Nielson
- Edited by: Richard Smither
- Music by: Paul Leonard-Morgan
- Production companies: 87North Productions; Gulfstream Pictures
- Distributed by: Amazon MGM Studios (via Prime Video) (Note: Released through the Metro-Goldwyn-Mayer banner.)
- Release dates: March 13, 2026 (SXSW); March 25, 2026 (Worldwide)
- Running time: 88 minutes
- Countries: United States; United Kingdom
- Language: English

Pretty Lethal is a 2026 action thriller film directed by Vicky Jewson and written by Kate Freund. The film stars Iris Apatow, Lana Condor, Millicent Simmonds, Avantika, Maddie Ziegler, and Uma Thurman. In this film, a dysfunctional ballet troupe is forced to take shelter when their bus breaks down en route to a prestigious competition and must use their training to fight back when a gang of armed men target them.

The premiered at the South by Southwest Film & TV Festival on March 13, 2026, and was released worldwide by Amazon Prime Video on March 25.

== Plot ==
A Los Angeles-based ballet troupe, consisting of principal dancer Bones, bratty socialite Princess, deeply religious Grace, kind-hearted Zoe, and her hearing impaired sister Chloe, are invited to a prestigious international competition in Budapest with their teacher, Thorna Devonport. Mix-ups at the airport result in the troupe having to take a run-down bus to the competition; when it breaks down, they leave on foot to find a cab. A local man invites them to enter the Teremok Inn, a performance art themed hotel run by Devora Kasimer, a former prima ballerina and head of a small crime family. At Devora's suggestion, the girls change out of their rain-soaked clothes into their tutus.

While taking Chloe to the ladies' room, Thorna sees Devora torturing a man in her office. She tries to round up the girls so they can leave, but Pasha Marcovic, Devora's criminal associate, impulsively shoots her in the head after she knees him in the groin for making a drunken advance. When Princess threatens to call the police, Devora has the girls locked in the inn's basement and burns their passports and cellphones. Bones tries to flee but gets knocked out and dragged downstairs. Meanwhile, Chloe, unaware of the situation, begins hooking up with Devora's youngest son, Artyom.

Angered by Pasha's actions, Devora refuses to pay protection until she meets his father, gangster Lothar "The Butcher" Marcovic, and hires a cleaner, Doktor, to dispose of the girls' corpses after she kills them. Bones awakens to find Grace drugged up and escapes her bonds. The doorman, Osip, arrives to rape Grace; Bones uses her dance training and a sharp blade to kill him and rounds up the troupe. Pasha sends his bodyguards to kill the girls in secret. By weaponizing their pointe shoes with razorblades and using dance positions as improvised martial arts, they are able to cut down their attackers. As the girls decide to find Chloe, Princess splits off from the group in a selfish attempt to save herself but returns after seeing Doktor chopping up Thorna's body.

Devora orders her henchmen to find and kill the girls, before forcing Pasha to call his father for help. With Bones leading, all five girls perform moves from The Nutcracker and improvised weapons in a gruesome hand-to-hand fight that leaves all of the men dead, but spare Artyom. Devora rigs the building to blow with C-4 explosives. Bones gets the other girls out but is captured by Devora, who shoots Pasha in the leg, revealing that his father was responsible for her prosthetic leg due to her father's inability to pay off a debt, thus ruining her ballet career. As Lothar closes in on Teremok, Devora dons her old Sugar Plum Fairy tutu, as Princess saves Bones from having her leg amputated by Doktor, killing him in the process, and the two find Pasha.

As Lothar and his men arrive, Grace, Zoe, and Chloe return inside to find Bones and Princess, discovering the inn rigged to blow. Devora, holding a remote trigger for the C-4, encounters the five ballerinas. Sympathetic to Devora's tragedy, Bones pleads with her to spare them, dancer to dancer. Devora takes Pasha as a hostage and allows the girls to flee while Lothar and his men storm the hotel. Devora reveals to Lothar who she really is before setting off the explosives, killing her, Lothar, Pasha, and Marcovic's men, as the girls escape in the nick of time. The troupe commandeer some of Lothar's motorcycles and ride past the broken-down bus to Budapest. There, at the theatre, they perform their repertoire as a team, in their blood-stained tutus, in Thorna's memory.

== Cast ==
- Iris Apatow as Zoe
- Lana Condor as Princess
- Millicent Simmonds as Chloe
- Avantika as Grace
- Maddie Ziegler as Bones
- Michael Culkin as Lothar Marcovic
- Lydia Leonard as Thorna Devonport
- Uma Thurman as Devora Kasimer
- Julian Krenn as Yuri
- Miklós Béres as Osip
- Krisztián Csákvári as Artyom Kasimer
- Kate Freund as Sona
- Tamás Szabó Sipos as Pasha Marcovic
- Balázs Megyeri as Saber Kasimer
- Gábor Nagypál as Doktor

== Production ==
The film was first announced as Ballerina Overdrive in February 2023, with Vicky Jewson set to direct and Lena Headey, Yara Shahidi, Isabela Merced, Lana Condor, Millicent Simmonds and Iris Apatow cast to star. Filming was expected to occur in Serbia in the spring of 2023.

Production was delayed to August 2024, commencing in Budapest, with Headey, Shahidi and Merced having exited the film. Maddie Ziegler, Avantika and Uma Thurman were added to the cast in their place. Filming concluded in October. The film was later retitled Pretty Lethal.

== Release ==
In November 2024, it was revealed that international sales agent The Veterans had sold all international distribution rights to Amazon MGM Studios. In September 2025, Amazon MGM was reported to be nearing a deal for U.S. distribution rights for $11–12 million, giving them worldwide rights to the film.

It premiered at the 2026 SXSW Festival on March 13, 2026, and was released worldwide on Amazon Prime Video on March 25, 2026.

== Reception ==
On the review aggregator website Rotten Tomatoes, 60% of 73 critics' reviews are positive, with an average rating of 5.7/10. The website's consensus reads: "Starting off with a fun hook and diluting it with a plethora of clichés, Pretty Lethal doesn't reach its full operatic potential but doles out enough balletic action to remain reasonably en pointe." On Metacritic, which uses a weighted average, the film holds a score of 51/100 based on 15 critics, indicating "mixed or average" reviews. Ziegler was nominated for the 2026 Critics' Choice Super Award for Best Actress in an Action Movie.
