= Nick Hurran =

British director (born 1959)

- Born: November 1959 (age 66); London, England
- Occupations: Film and television director
- Years active: 1980s–present
- Spouse: Michele Buck
- Children: 2

Nick Hurran (born November 1959) is a British film and television director. His 1998 film Girls' Night was entered into the 48th Berlin International Film Festival.

== Biography ==
Nick Hurran was born in November 1959, in London. He began as a floor manager in the 1980s, and worked two years at the Royal National Theatre, before beginning to direct his first television film The Perfect Match (1995). He made his directorial debut with Remember Me? (1997). Hurran's next film, Girls' Night (1998), was entered into the 48th Berlin International Film Festival. Hurran is married to a television producer, Michele Buck, with whom he has two children.

== Selected filmography ==
=== Film ===
Year	Title
1997	Remember Me?
1998	Girls' Night
1999	Virtual Sexuality
2002	Plots with a View
2004	Little Black Book
2006	It's a Boy Girl Thing

=== Television ===
Year	Series	Episode
1995	The Perfect Match	Television film
2000	Happy Birthday Shakespeare	Television film
2000	Take a Girl Like You	Television film
2003	The Last Detective	1 episode
2005	Walk Away and I Stumble	Television film
2007	A Class Apart	Television film
2008	Bonekickers	1 episode
2009	The Prisoner	6 episodes
2011	Doctor Who	"The Girl Who Waited"
2011	Doctor Who	"The God Complex"
2012	Doctor Who	"Asylum of the Daleks"
2012	Doctor Who	"The Angels Take Manhattan"
2013	Doctor Who	"The Day of the Doctor"
2014	Sherlock	"His Last Vow"
2015	Childhood's End	3 episodes
2016	Travelers	1 episode
2017	Sherlock	"The Lying Detective"
2018	Altered Carbon	2 episodes
