= Big Mood =

British television series

- Genre: Comedy-drama; Black comedy
- Created by: Camilla Whitehill
- Screenplay by: Camilla Whitehill
- Directed by: Rebecca Asher
- Starring: Nicola Coughlan; Lydia West
- Theme music composer: Jeremy Warmsley
- Country of origin: United Kingdom
- Original language: English
- No. of series: 2
- No. of episodes: 12

Production
- Executive producers: Lotte Beasley Mestriner; Laurence Bowen; Chris Carey
- Producer: Georgie Fallon
- Production company: Dancing Ledge Productions

Original release
- Network: Channel 4
- Release: 28 March 2024 – present

Big Mood is a British dark comedy-drama series. The first season was broadcast on Channel 4 on 28 March 2024. The series is written and created by Camilla Whitehill, directed by Rebecca Asher, and starring Nicola Coughlan and Lydia West.

A second season of Big Mood was confirmed in February 2025.. It was released on 16 April 2026.

== Synopsis ==
Maggie (Coughlan) and Eddie (West) have been best friends for a decade but can the friendship survive in a landscape of increased work, life and mental health pressures?

== Cast ==
=== Main ===
- Nicola Coughlan as Maggie, a struggling playwright with bipolar disorder and Eddie's best friend.
- Lydia West as Eddie (Theodora), co-owner and manager of the struggling pub the 'Wet Mouth' and Maggie's best friend. The pub belonged to her dad before he died.
- Robert Gilbert as Will, Eddie's friend from high school and a frequent patron of the Wet Mouth.
- Amalia Vitale as Anya
- Eamon Farren as Klent / Krent, the newly hired manager of the Wet Mouth who often slacks off on his job. His name is revealed to be Krent in the Season 1 finale
- Ukweli Roach as Jay, co-owner of the Wet Mouth and Eddie's brother. He is frequently making plans for doomsday.
- Luke Fetherston as Ryan
- Hannah Onslow as Whitney (season 2)

=== Recurring ===
- Layla-Belle Matthews as Demon Child 1
- Skylar Betteridge as Demon Child 2
- David Mumeni as Kaz
- Max Bennett as Jonah, Eddie's ex-boyfriend
- Stephen Sobal as Owen
- Niamh Cusack as Gillian, Maggie's mother

=== Guest ===
- Tim Downie as Mr. Wilson, Maggie's old history teacher
- Olu Adaeze as Patient
- Ron Donachie as Pagan Wizard
- Sarah Durham as Receptionist
- Amy Gledhill as Toad
- Tom Rhys Harries as Johnny
- Freya Parker as Alison
- Joanna Page as herself
- Kate Fleetwood as Clara
- Rebecca Lowman as Vanessa
- Sally Phillips as Dr Burrows, Maggie's new psychiatrist doctor
- David Bedella as Clyde
- Lara Grace Ilori as Big Lily
- Neil Edmond as John Cade
- Maddie Grace Jepson as Jade

== Episodes ==
=== Season 1 (2024) ===
No. overall	No. in series	Title	Directed by	Written by	Original release date
1	1	"Up"	Rebecca Asher	Camilla Whitehill	28 March 2024
2	2	"Down"	Rebecca Asher	Camilla Whitehill	28 March 2024
3	3	"Deeper"	Rebecca Asher	Camilla Whitehill	28 March 2024
4	4	"The Middle"	Rebecca Asher	Camilla Whitehill	28 March 2024
5	5	"The Edge"	Rebecca Asher	Camilla Whitehill	28 March 2024
6	6	"The Great Beyond"	Rebecca Asher	Camilla Whitehill	28 March 2024

=== Season 2 (2026) ===
No. overall	No. in series	Title	Directed by	Written by	Original release date
7	1	"Leagues"	Rebecca Asher	Camilla Whitehill	16 April 2026
8	2	"Fathoms"	Rebecca Asher	Camilla Whitehill	16 April 2026
9	3	"Cubits"	Rebecca Asher	Camilla Whitehill	16 April 2026
10	4	"Hands"	Rebecca Asher	Camilla Whitehill	16 April 2026
11	5	"Furlong"	Rebecca Asher	Camilla Whitehill	16 April 2026
12	6	"Poppyseeds"	Rebecca Asher	Camilla Whitehill	16 April 2026

== Production ==
The production was originally entitled Super Close. It is produced by Georgie Fallon for Dancing Ledge Productions. It was written and created by Camilla Whitehill and directed by Rebecca Asher. Lotte Beasley Mestriner executive produced with Laurence Bowen and Chris Carey. Channel 4 released a first look image from filming in April 2023. The cast includes comedy actresses Sally Phillips, Amy Gledhill and Freya Parker, with a guest appearance from Joanna Page, playing herself.

A second series was confirmed by Channel 4 in February 2025.

== Broadcast ==
Big Mood was first broadcast in the United Kingdom on Channel 4 on 28 March 2024, with all episodes released on its streaming service. In Australia, the series started streaming on Stan from 29 March 2024. In the United States and Canada, Big Mood was launched on Tubi on 19 April 2024.

== Home media ==
Big Mood was released on UK Region 2 DVD by Dazzler Media on 15 July 2024.

== Reception ==
=== Critical Response ===
Big Mood scored 70 out of 100 on Metacritic, based on 7 critics, indicating generally favorable reviews. Season one of Big Mood scored an average of 60% on Rotten Tomatoes, based on 5 reviews.

Joel Golby in The Guardian praised the script for avoiding tropes of the genre and praised the performance of an "excellent" Coughlan, who "plays Maggie with big bombastic take-all-the-energy-in-the-room aplomb…and then she turns, playing grey and small and slithering with just as much skill". Emma Loffhagen in The Evening Standard gave the series five stars, writing that it may be Coughlan's best work, and praised the script saying it "never even threatens to slide into the passé" and "not since Fleabag have I seen comedic writing this good, this current." In July 2024, Deadline Hollywood named it one of the best new shows of the year.

=== Viewership ===
Big Mood was Channel 4’s most-watched new comedy launch since Derry Girls, with over 49 million viewer minutes.

=== Accolades ===
The series was nominated for, and won Best TV Comedy Drama at the Comedy.co.uk Awards. Coughlan was nominated and won Best Comedy Performance at the TV Choice Awards 2025.

Coughlan received her first British Academy Television Awards nomination for Best Female Performance in a Comedy.
