= Back to the Future: The Musical =

Musical stage adaptation of the 1985 film

- Broadway promotional poster
- Music: Alan Silvestri
- Lyrics: Glen Ballard
- Book: Bob Gale
- Basis: Back to the Future by Bob Gale; Robert Zemeckis
- Premiere: Manchester Opera House
- Productions: 2020 Manchester; 2021 West End; 2023 Broadway; 2024 North American tour 2026 UK tour
- Awards: Laurence Olivier Award for Best New Musical

Back to the Future: The Musical is a musical with music and lyrics by Alan Silvestri and Glen Ballard and a book by Bob Gale. It is adapted from the 1985 film Back to the Future by Robert Zemeckis and Gale. The show features original music, as well as songs featured in the film ("The Power of Love", "Earth Angel", "Johnny B. Goode" and "Back in Time").

Originally planned to première in London's West End in 2015, the year to which the film trilogy's characters traveled in Part II, a change in directors delayed the production. The musical premiered at Manchester Opera House in February 2020, ahead of a 2021 West End transfer. It starred Olly Dobson as Marty McFly and Roger Bart as "Doc" Brown, with Hugh Coles as George McFly. The production received positive reviews in London and won the Laurence Olivier Award for Best New Musical in 2022. It ran until 2026.

The musical ran on Broadway from June 2023 until January 2025. Bart and Coles reprised their roles, and Casey Likes played Marty. A North American tour began in June 2024.

== Background ==
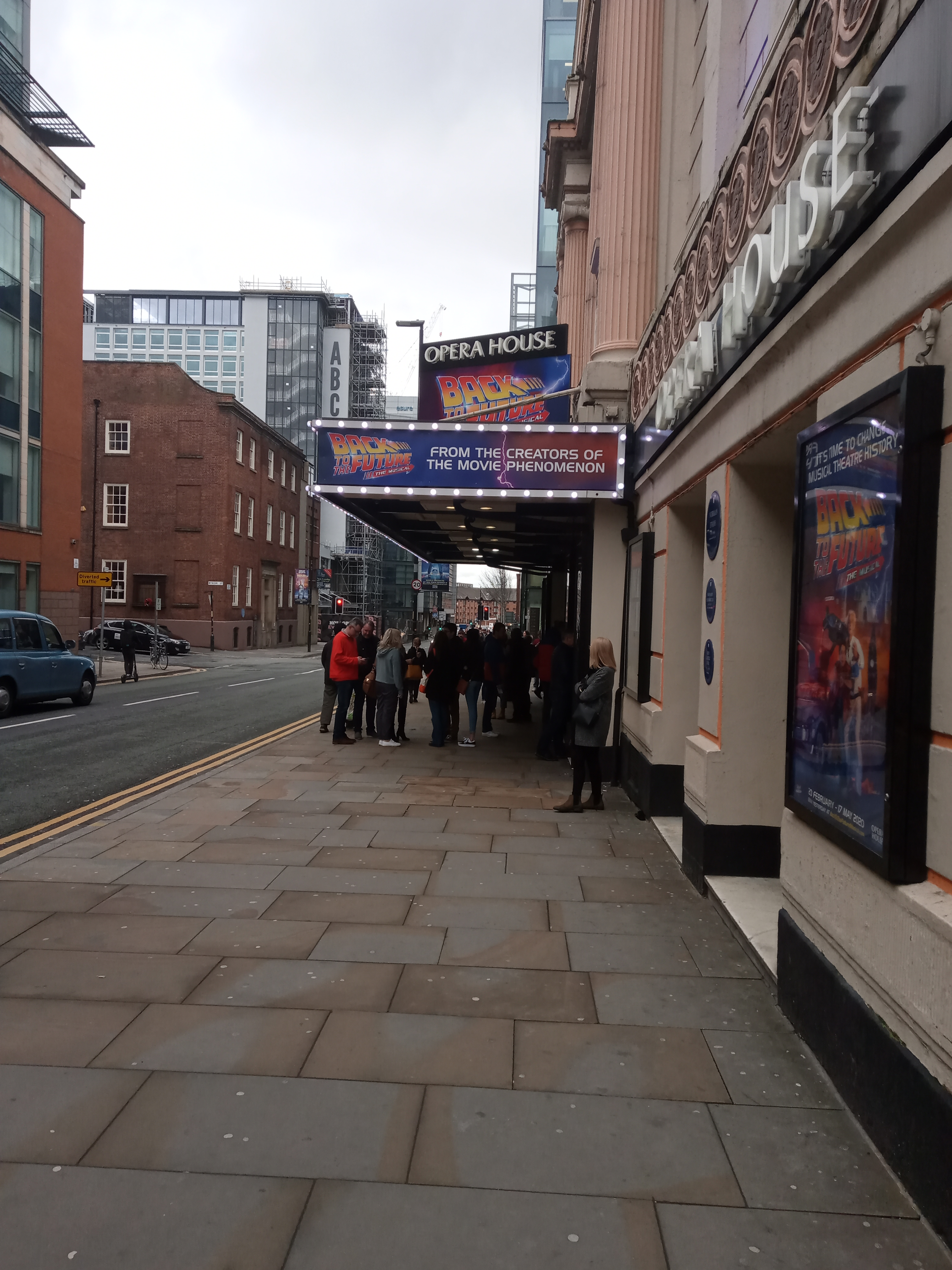
Marquee of the Manchester Opera House during the show's run in 2020

The 1985 movie and its two sequels were box office successes, taking in over $936 million at the box office. In the United Kingdom, the popularity of the original film Back to the Future was boosted by its broadcast on television around Christmas for several years starting in 1988.

At a 2004 DeLorean convention, Bob Gale said that he was interested in adapting Back to the Future for Broadway. In 2012, a musical adaption of the 1985 film began development. Workshops for the musical took place in 2014 in July in London and the following month in Los Angeles, with the intention to open the show in the West End in 2015, in time for the 30th anniversary of the film.

Jamie Lloyd was initially engaged to direct the production but withdrew from the project in September 2014 after the workshops, citing creative differences. Gale later recalled that those creative differences concerned whether the character Biff should sing: "[Lloyd] thought that a villain would be more villainous if he didn't sing. For me, that was the dealbreaker". Lloyd's withdrawal from the production was expected to delay the premiere until at least 2016, and a new director was sought.

== Synopsis ==
=== Act I ===
In Hill Valley, California, October 25, 1985 ("Overture"), Marty McFly arrives at the home of his scientist friend, Dr. Emmett "Doc" Brown, to find a pre-recorded message, playing on a large amplifier, asking Marty to meet him in the parking lot of Twin Pines Mall after midnight. After destroying the amplifier while playing his electric guitar, Marty walks through town and dreams about being a successful rock artist. A man named Goldie Wilson is running for mayor ("It's Only a Matter of Time").

When Marty's band audition is rejected ("Got No Future"), Marty's girlfriend, Jennifer Parker, comforts him ("Wherever We're Going") but they are interrupted by fundraisers for the restoration of the town's clock tower, which was damaged by lightning in 1955. Marty, with a flyer on the clocktower in hand, heads home to find his father George being harassed by his boss, Biff Tannen. George discourages Marty from chasing big dreams, his brother Dave explains his job at a burger restaurant and his mother, Lorraine McFly, discourages his sister, Linda, from dating and talks about how she first met George and kissed him at a school dance as Marty laments his family's state ("Hello, Is Anybody Home?").

At the Twin Pines Mall parking lot, Marty meets Doc who unveils a time machine made from a DeLorean and explains how he built it ("It Works"). However, due to inadequate protection while loading plutonium into the car's reactor, Doc is afflicted by acute radiation poisoning and is dying. Marty jumps in the car to seek medical help but accidentally accelerates to 88 miles per hour (142 km/h), sending him back in time to the day Doc conceptualised time travel in 1955. Ditching the car in a barn, Marty wanders to the town square where the citizens of Hill Valley celebrate the town ("Cake"). Marty witnesses his teenage father being threatened by Biff and his gang ("Got No Future" (reprise)) and tells him to stand up for himself. When he accidentally reveals then-diner employee Goldie will become Mayor of Hill Valley, Goldie is inspired and encourages George to also increase his self-esteem ("Gotta Start Somewhere"). Marty later finds George spying on teenage Lorraine from a tree ("My Myopia") but is knocked unconscious when George falls. Hours later, Marty wakes up in Lorraine's bedroom, where he is being cared for. Lorraine falls for Marty who tries to fend off her advances ("Pretty Baby").

Marty finds his way to Doc's house and convinces a younger Doc that he came from 1985 by revealing his knowledge about Doc's Flux Capacitor. Finding the car, Doc worries that Marty will be stuck in 1955 forever. As Marty despairs ("Future Boy"), Doc states that a bolt of lightning could power the time machine, and from the information on Marty's flyer, they plan how to use the lightning bolt. Marty tells Doc he encountered both of his parents; realizing Marty's future existence is in jeopardy, Doc instructs him to avoid meeting anyone from history and make sure George and Lorraine fall in love. The next day, they infiltrate Hill Valley High School ("Hill Valley High School Fight Song"), where Marty encourages George to ask Lorraine out to the school's upcoming dance. George tries to follow Marty's advice but runs afoul of Biff, forcing Marty to intervene. As Marty and George are chased around the campus, Lorraine tells her friends about the boy she tended to, while Biff and his gang hear rumors about Marty and plot to get rid of him. Marty fends off Biff, inadvertently awing Lorraine further ("Something About That Boy").

=== Act II ===
Doc Brown dreams of the social, technological, economic, and political advances of the future ("21st Century"), waking up as Lorraine invites Marty to the school dance to which Marty reluctantly accepts ("Something About That Boy" (reprise)). Marty visits George to boost his self confidence and dance abilities in preparation for the dance ("Put Your Mind to It"), running through the plan for George to win over Lorraine as well.

As he plans to use a wire running from the clocktower to send the lightning to the DeLorean, Doc recalls how some scientists throughout history became famous, while others failed to fulfil their goals ("For the Dreamers"). Meanwhile, Biff and his gang learn of Marty's attendance at the upcoming dance and plot to beat him up ("Teach Him a Lesson"). On the night of the dance, Doc thanks Marty for giving him hope for his future; Marty secretly writes a letter to warn him of his death in 1985, despite being warned of the harm from disclosing future events. Marty reflects on his only chance to return to the future, while thinking of Jennifer back in 1985 for inspiration ("Only a Matter of Time" (reprise)).

During the school dance ("Deep Divin'"), Lorraine advances on Marty ("Pretty Baby" (reprise)) before Biff locks him in a nearby dumpster and assaults Lorraine. Biff overpowers an arriving George, but George defeats him in one punch. As George escorts a grateful Lorraine to the dance, singer Marvin Berry and his band, on a smoke break, free Marty from the dumpster. Marvin's fingers are accidentally clamped by the closing lid. Knowing music will be needed for George and Lorraine to kiss, Marty volunteers to play guitar instead. The band plays "Earth Angel" as George and Lorraine kiss, saving Marty's existence. On Marvin's request for another song, Marty performs "Johnny B. Goode", but his guitar solo stuns the crowd.

After bidding farewell to George and Lorraine, Marty leaves the dance to meet Doc who explains that high winds disconnected the upper cables and that he would have to reconnect them despite his fear of heights. Marty gives his letter to Doc who destroys it, worried about the consequences. Doc faces his fear and the storm to connect the wires ("For the Dreamers" (reprise)), while Marty drives the DeLorean, inserts the electric hook and accelerates to 88 miles per hour as the lightning strikes and sends him back to October 26, 1985. However, upon arrival, the car shuts down, preventing Marty from bringing Doc to the hospital. As Marty grieves over failing to save Doc, Doc appears, revealing that he pieced the letter back together and wore a better protective suit. He thanks Marty and bids him goodbye before departing to the future in the DeLorean. Marty sleeps in the courthouse square.

The following morning, Marty discovers his father is now a renowned science fiction author with an annual celebration named after him, his family is more professionally and socially successful, and a timid Biff is in George's employ. At the celebration, the McFlys present the town with a check to restore the clock tower. As Marty and his band perform "The Power of Love" and the whole town joins in, Doc suddenly returns in the upgraded DeLorean, insisting Marty come with him to see the future. Marty hops in, and Doc sets the car's destination date to the exact time and date of the musical's current performance. The DeLorean takes off and flies overhead, and into the future ("Finale").

== Productions ==
=== Manchester (2020) ===
The musical began previews on 20 February, with an opening night on 11 March 2020, after a five-year delay, at the Manchester Opera House. The production was directed by John Rando, with choreography by Chris Bailey, set and costume design by Tim Hatley, video design by Finn Ross, lighting by Tim Lutkin and Hugh Vanstone, and sound design by Gareth Owen.

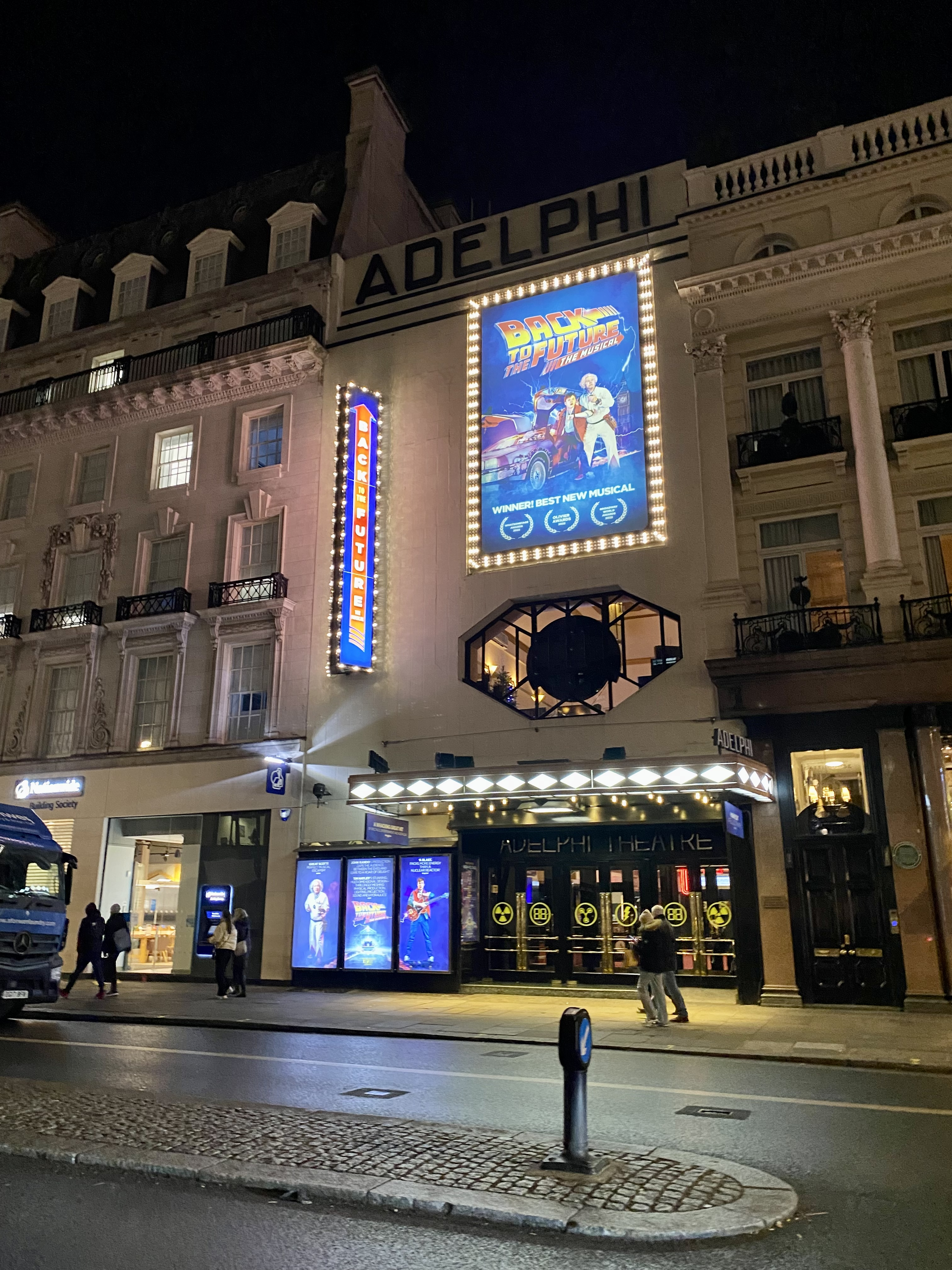
Back to the Future at the Adelphi Theatre in 2022

Only a few days after the official opening, due to the COVID-19 pandemic, the Manchester Opera House closed on 16 March 2020. The show did not reopen until it transferred to the West End.

=== West End (2021–2026) ===
The Manchester production transferred to the Adelphi Theatre in London's West End, where it opened on 13 September 2021 with the same cast and creative team. In 2022, the original cast album was released. The production was nominated for seven Laurence Olivier Awards that year, including Best New Musical, which it won, as well as Best Original Score or New Orchestrations. The production closed on 12 April 2026 after 1,913 performances.

=== Broadway (2023–2025) ===
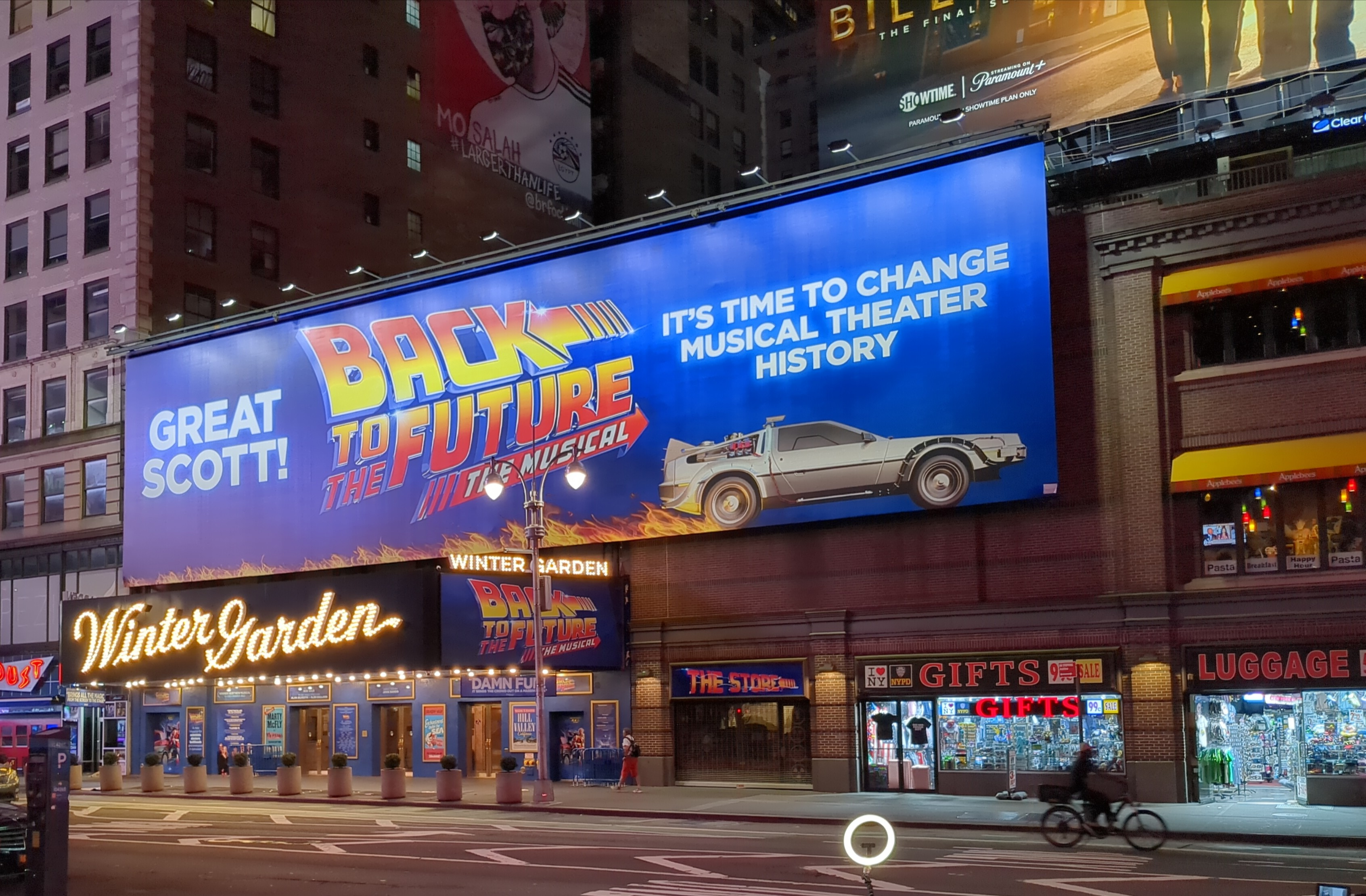
Back to the Future at the Winter Garden Theatre, 2023

The musical began previews on Broadway on 30 June 2023 at the Winter Garden Theatre and opened officially on 3 August. The production had the same creative team as the original West End production. Roger Bart and Hugh Coles from the original London cast returned as Doc Brown and George McFly, respectively, with Casey Likes as Marty McFly; the cast also included Liana Hunt as Lorraine Baines, Jelani Remy as Goldie Wilson/Marvin Berry, Nathaniel Hackmann as Biff Tannen, Mikaela Secada as Jennifer Parker, Merritt David Janes as Principal Strickland, Daryl Tofa as Dave McFly and Amber Ardolino as Linda McFly. The production received two nominations at the 77th Tony Awards: Best Featured Actor in a Musical (Bart) and Best Scenic Design of a Musical. The production closed on 5 January 2025 after 35 previews and 597 performances.

=== North American tour (2024–2026) ===
A North American tour opened at Playhouse Square in Cleveland, Ohio, on 14 June 2024, following preview performances from 6 June at Proctors Theatre in Schenectady, New York. Don Stephenson and Caden Brauch lead the tour as Doc Brown and Marty, respectively. The tour closed on 21 June 2026.

=== UK and European tour (2026–present) ===
A UK and European tour opened on 8 October 2026 at the Bristol Hippodrome, with Roger Bart reprising his role as Doc Brown and Axel Duffy as Marty McFly.

From 23 September to 10 October 2027, the tour is expected to play a limited engagement at La Seine Musicale in Paris. The show will be performed in English with French subtitles.

== Other productions ==
A Japanese-language production of the musical, directed by John Rando, opened at the Shiki Theatre in Tokyo, Japan, on 6 April 2025. A production aboard Royal Caribbean International's ship Star of the Seas launched in mid-2025.

An Australian production opened on 26 September 2025 at the Sydney Lyric Theatre, with Bart reprising his role as Doc Brown. The production closed on 25 January 2026.

A German-language production opened in Hamburg on 21 March 2026.

== Cast and characters ==
Character	Manchester	West End	Broadway	North American tour	UK tour
Character	2020	2021	2023	2024	2026
Marty McFly	Olly Dobson	Olly Dobson	Casey Likes	Caden Brauch	Axel Duffy
Doc Brown	Roger Bart	Roger Bart	Roger Bart	Don Stephenson	Roger Bart
George McFly	Hugh Coles	Hugh Coles	Hugh Coles	Burke Swanson	James Oliver
Lorraine Baines	Rosanna Hyland	Rosanna Hyland	Liana Hunt	Zan Berube	Danielle Rose
Goldie Wilson / Marvin Berry	Cedric Neal	Cedric Neal	Jelani Remy	Cartreze Tucker	Brandon Lee Sears
Biff Tannen	Aidan Cutler	Aidan Cutler	Nathaniel Hackmann	Ethan Rogers	Toby Shellard
Jennifer Parker	Courtney-Mae Briggs	Courtney-Mae Briggs	Mikaela Secada	Kiara Lee	Tash Bacarese-Hamilton
Principal Strickland	Mark Oxtoby	Mark Oxtoby	Merritt David Janes	Luke Antony Neville	Rhys Owen
Dave McFly	Will Haswell	Will Haswell	Daryl Tofa	Fisher Lane Stewart	Blake Jordan
Linda McFly	Emma Lloyd	Emma Lloyd	Amber Ardolino	Laura Sky Herman	Katrina Stenning

=== Notable replacements ===
==== West End (2021–2026) ====
- Doc Brown: Cory English, Brian Conley
- Marty McFly: Ben Joyce
- Lorraine Baines: Amber Davies, Maddie Grace Jepson

== Musical numbers ==
Act 1

- "Overture"
- "It's Only a Matter of Time" – Marty McFly, Goldie Wilson, Ensemble
- "Audition"/"Got No Future" – Marty
- "Wherever We're Going" – Jennifer Parker, Marty
- "Hello, Is Anybody Home?" – Marty, George McFly, Dave McFly, Linda McFly, and Lorraine McFly
- "It Works" – Dr. Emmett "Doc" Brown, Female Ensemble
- "Cake" – Ensemble (Spokeswoman, Gas Station Attendants, Insulation Man, Farmer, Mayor Red Thomas)
- "Got No Future" (reprise) – Marty #
- "Good at Being Bad" – Biff Tannen %
- "Gotta Start Somewhere" – Goldie Wilson, Ensemble
- "My Myopia" – George
- "Pretty Baby" – Lorraine and Girls
- "Future Boy" – Marty, Doc, Ensemble
- "Hill Valley High School Fight Song" – Ensemble #
- "Something About That Boy" – Lorraine, Biff Tannen, 3D, Slick, Ensemble

Act 2

- "21st Century" – Doc, Ensemble
- "Something About That Boy" (reprise) – Lorraine #
- "Put Your Mind to It" – Marty, George
- "For the Dreamers" – Doc
- "Teach Him a Lesson" – Biff, 3D, Slick
- "The Letter"/"It's Only a Matter of Time" (reprise) – Marty, Jennifer
- "Deep Divin'" – Marvin Berry, Ensemble
- "Pretty Baby" (reprise) – Lorraine #
- "Earth Angel" – Marvin, George, Lorraine, Ensemble
- "Johnny B. Goode" – Marty, Ensemble
- "The Clocktower"/"For the Dreamers" (reprise) – Doc
- "The Power of Love" – Marty, Jennifer, Goldie Wilson, Company
- "Doc Returns"/"Finale" – Full Company
- "Back in Time" – Marty, Doc, Company

# Not included in the Original Cast Recording
% Song cut from the original West End production

== Cast recording ==
The Back to the Future website announced on 21 October 2020 ("Back to the Future Day") that a cast recording of the West End production would be released by Sony's Masterworks Broadway imprint. The announcement was accompanied by the release of Olly Dobson's rendition of "Back in Time", which was featured in the first film and its soundtrack, in addition to the original track "Put Your Mind to It". The cast recording was released on 11 March 2022.

A Deluxe Edition of the cast recording album was released on 20 October 2023. This album includes a second disc of 13 demo versions of songs written for the musical.

== Reception ==
The Guardian reported that fans of the franchise gave the Manchester tryout positive reviews, with one commenting that it's "a wonderful tribute to the film" and another that "people are going to be talking about this for a long time". The show received a generally positive critical reception upon its West End opening. The production design received widespread praise, and the performances of Bart, Dobson, Coles and Neal were reviewed positively.

The Broadway production received more mixed reviews. Frank Rizzo of Variety wrote, "with the frequent breaking of the fourth wall and the milking of some meta moments, you wonder what exactly the show’s aiming to be: a self-aware joke for fans or a thrill ride with sincerity". Jesse Green of The New York Times stated, "though large, it's less a full-scale new work than a semi-operable souvenir". Most of the critical praise was given to the technical aspects, especially scenes featuring the DeLorean.

== Awards and nominations ==
=== Original West End production ===
Year	Award	Category	Nominee	Result
2022	Laurence Olivier Award	Best New Musical		Won
2022	Laurence Olivier Award	Best Original Score or New Orchestrations	Glen Ballard, Bryan Crook, Ethan Popp and Alan Silvestri	Nominated
2022	Laurence Olivier Award	Best Actor in a Musical	Olly Dobson	Nominated
2022	Laurence Olivier Award	Best Actor in a Supporting Role	Hugh Coles	Nominated
2022	Laurence Olivier Award	Best Set Design	Tim Hatley and Finn Ross	Nominated
2022	Laurence Olivier Award	Best Lighting Design	Tim Lutkin	Nominated
2022	Laurence Olivier Award	Best Sound Design	Gareth Owen	Nominated
2022	WhatsOnStage Award	Best New Musical		Won
2022	WhatsOnStage Award	Best Performer in a Male Identifying Role in a Musical	Roger Bart	Nominated
2022	WhatsOnStage Award	Best Performer in a Male Identifying Role in a Musical	Olly Dobson	Nominated
2022	WhatsOnStage Award	Best Supporting Performer in a Male Identifying Role in a Musical	Hugh Coles	Won
2022	WhatsOnStage Award	Best Supporting Performer in a Male Identifying Role in a Musical	Cedric Neal	Nominated
2022	WhatsOnStage Award	Best Set Design	Tim Hatley	Nominated
2022	WhatsOnStage Award	Best Lighting Design	Tim Lutkin	Won
2022	WhatsOnStage Award	Best Sound Design	Gareth Owen	Won
2022	WhatsOnStage Award	Best Video Design	Finn Ross	Nominated

=== Original Broadway production ===
Year	Award	Category	Nominee	Result
2024	Outer Critics Circle Awards	Outstanding Lead Performer in a Broadway Musical	Casey Likes	Nominated
2024	Outer Critics Circle Awards	Outstanding Featured Performer in a Broadway Musical	Roger Bart	Nominated
2024	Outer Critics Circle Awards	Outstanding Lighting Design (Broadway or Off-Broadway)	Tim Lutkin and Hugh Vanstone	Nominated
2024	Outer Critics Circle Awards	Outstanding Sound Design (Broadway or Off-Broadway)	Gareth Owen	Nominated
2024	Outer Critics Circle Awards	Outstanding Video/Projections (Broadway or Off-Broadway)	Finn Ross	Nominated
2024	Tony Awards	Best Featured Actor in a Musical	Roger Bart	Nominated
2024	Tony Awards	Best Scenic Design of a Musical	Tim Hatley and Finn Ross	Nominated
