= Merritt David Janes =

American stage actor and singer

Merritt David Janes is an American stage actor and singer. He comes from a family of musicians and studied to be a music teacher at the University of Maine. He went on to study theatre at Circle in the Square Theatre School before becoming involved with national touring companies of Broadway shows in 2007.

== Professional career ==
Janes first toured nationally in 2007 with The Wedding Singer and starred as Robbie Hart. He then played Sweeney Todd in the second national tour of John Doyle's production of Sweeney Todd: The Demon Barber of Fleet Street. In 2010, Janes joined a national tour of Beauty and the Beast as Lumiere and stayed with the tour company for over a year. In 2011, he played the role of Lord Farquaad in a national tour of Shrek the Musical.

Janes played the role of Agent Carl Hanratty in the first national tour of Catch Me If You Can from October 2012 to June 2013. He then toured with the North American touring company of The Phantom of the Opera that began in November 2013.

Janes appeared in the ensemble of the original Broadway cast of Andrew Lloyd Webber's School of Rock and joined the first national tour of that musical, eventually playing Dewey. He has played Principal Strickland and Mayor Red Thomas in the Broadway production of Back to the Future: The Musical beginning in June 2023.
