= Maddie Grace Jepson =

English media personality (born 1999)

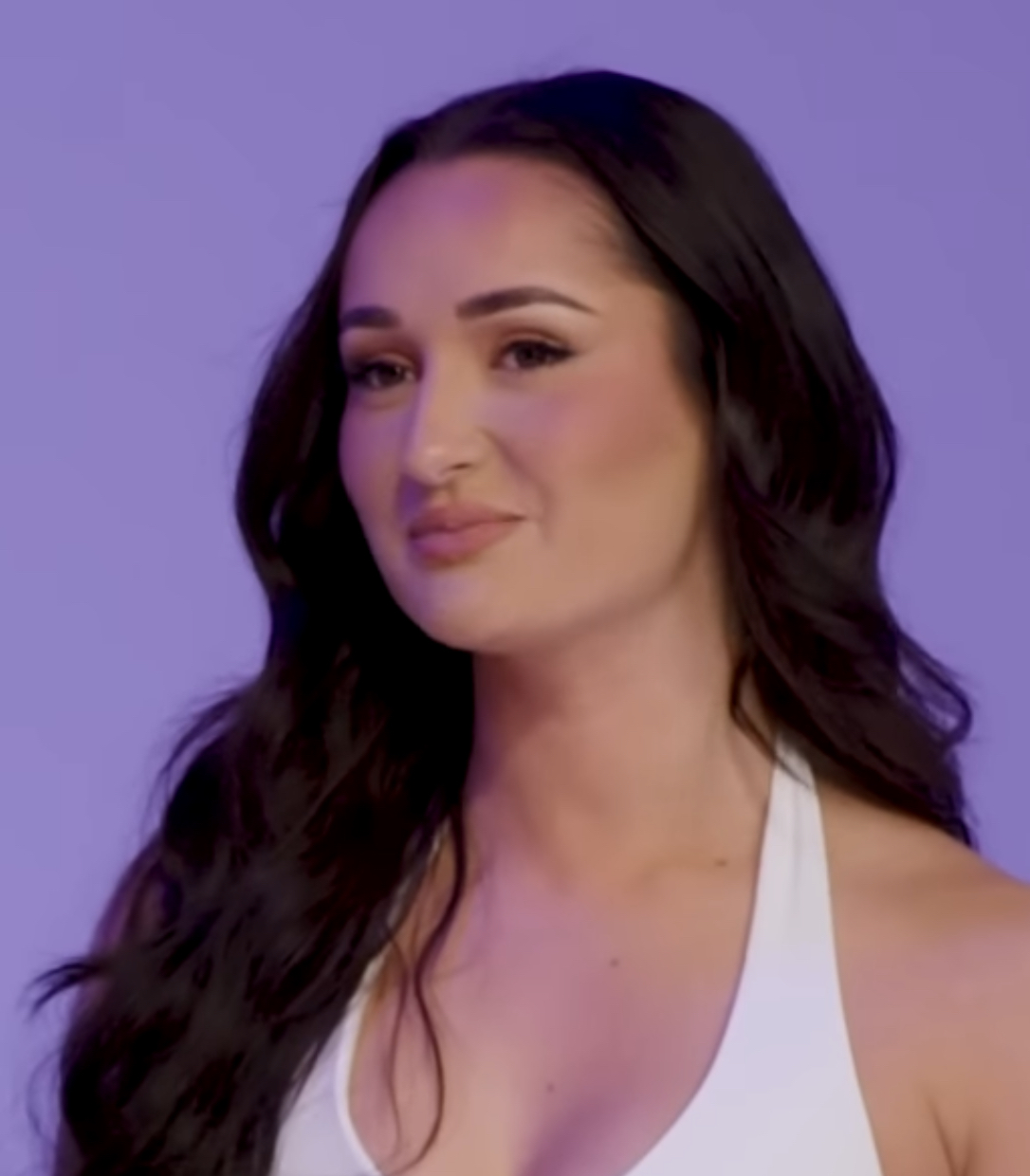
- Jepson in 2025
- Born: Madeleine Grace Jepson; 22 August 1999 (age 27); Bristol, England
- Education: Guildford School of Acting
- Occupations: Influencer; actress

TikTok information
- Page: maddiegracejepson
- Genres: Absurdist comedy; lifestyle
- Followers: 1.9 million
- Last updated: 20 April 2026

Madeleine Grace Jepson (born 22 August 1999) is an English social media personality and actress. She began a musical theatre career as a child, appearing in various productions including Bugsy Malone, High School Musical and The Little Mermaid. As an adult, Jepson amassed an online following on TikTok after posting comedy videos and has since appeared on the West End production of Back to the Future: The Musical, as well as the Channel 4 television series Big Mood.

== Life and career ==
Jepson was born in Bristol and moved to Yorkshire.

An energetic child, Jepson's mother enrolled her in a gymnastics class aged four in a bid to control her energy. She has recalled often climbing on things and has a scar on her face from climbing upon shelves with a pair of scissors in her hands. She then began appearing in musical productions as a child, including Bugsy Malone and High School Musical, before stopping to focus on gymnastics. However, since she got injured frequently doing gymnastics, she quit and began doing drama again. She enrolled at the Guildford School of Acting in 2017, studying musical theatre. Whilst there, she was cast as Ariel in their production of The Little Mermaid. At the time, this was her one leading role, since she has stated that her drama school did not give her many opportunities. She graduated during the COVID-19 lockdowns.

During the COVID-19 pandemic, Jepson made a TikTok account and began posting absurdist comedy videos for her friends. She was shocked when one of the videos went viral, after which she began to amass an online following. Jepson has become known to speak using her tongue in an exaggerated manner. In 2023, Jepson was responsible for creating a trend where people sing "when you know the words to the song, sing along, sing along", trying to make another person guess a song. Later that year, she became the host of an eight-part BBC Sounds podcast exploring the career of One Direction, titled One Direction: A Fan Story. On hosting it, Jepson said: "My very first Twitter handle was literally 'maddietomlinson' with my whole account dedicated to the band, so being able to do this has literally been a dream come true".

In 2024, Jepson appeared in her first professional acting role, as Jade in an episode of Channel 4's Big Mood. Later that year, she performed a one woman show at the Bloomsbury Theatre in London. Then, in 2025, she appeared as a guest on Channel 4's The Last Leg. Also in 2025, it was announced that Jepson would be making her West End theatre debut in Back to the Future: The Musical. She was cast as Lorraine Baines. In 2026, she is set to revive her one-woman show, this time in a tour across the United Kingdom. She also competed in the first series of The Celebrity Apprentice.

== Filmography ==
Year	Title	Role	Notes
2024	Big Mood	Jade	Episode: "Deeper"
2025	The Last Leg	Herself	Guest appearance
2026	Run Away	Influencer	1 episode
2026	The Celebrity Apprentice	Herself	Contestant

== Stage ==
Year	Title	Role	Venue	Ref.
2019	The Little Mermaid	Ariel	Guildford School of Acting	
2024, 2026	Maddie Grace Jepson Live!	Herself	UK tour	
2025–2026	Back to the Future: The Musical	Lorraine Baines	Adelphi Theatre	
