= Still Up =

2023 British television series

- Promotional poster
- Genre: Comedy drama
- Created by: Steve Burge; Natalie Walter
- Written by: Steve Burge; Bryce Hart; Natalie Walter
- Directed by: John Addis
- Starring: Antonia Thomas; Craig Roberts; Blake Harrison; Rich Fulcher; Samantha Spiro; Lois Chimimba; Luke Fetherston
- Country of origin: United Kingdom
- Original language: English
- No. of seasons: 1
- No. of episodes: 8

Production
- Executive producers: Phil Clarke; Paul Schlesinger
- Production company: Various Artists

Original release
- Network: Apple TV+
- Release: 22 September – 27 October 2023

Still Up is a British comedy drama television series created by Steve Burge and Natalie Walter and starring Antonia Thomas, Craig Roberts and Blake Harrison. It premiered on 22 September 2023 on Apple TV+. In May 2024, the series was cancelled after one season.

== Premise ==
Still Up follows the fluctuating late-night relationship of free-spirited illustrator Lisa (Antonia Thomas) and Danny (Craig Roberts), an agoraphobic journalist. Lisa and Danny are both insomniacs, and while the world sleeps, they stay connected and talk for hours despite having only met once.

== Cast ==
=== Main ===
- Antonia Thomas as Lisa
- Craig Roberts as Danny
- Blake Harrison as Veggie
- Rich Fulcher as Cat Man
- Lois Chimimba as Amy
- Luke Fetherston as Adam

=== Guest ===
- Cathy Murphy as Nikki
- Jo Martin as Angela
- Enzo Squillino Jr. as Alonzo
- Dan Renton Skinner as Clyde
- Alice Bailey Johnson as Kate
- Ruby Bentall as Kat
- Daisy Head as Chloe
- Bronte Smith as Poppy
- Jacqueline Boatswain as Anne Cooper
- Anuvab Pal as Al
- Andrea Valls as Pippa
- Albert Magashi as Tyler
- Samantha Spiro as Christine, Veggie's mother
- Colin Hoult as Puppet
- Letty Butler as Jane
- Anna Crilly as Dr. Jennifer Bentley
- Glen Davies as Bob
- Linda Hargreaves as Aunt Em
- Remy Beasley as Anna
- Ivana Bašić as Lena Zurawski
- Tim Samuels as Ian
- Steve Oram as Tony the Taxi Driver
- Sylvestra Le Touzel as Dr. Stafford
- Karl Theobald as Russell
- Steve Furst as Neville
- Daniel Mays as Rich
- Lucy Speed as Elaine, Tony's wife

== Episodes ==
No.	Title	Directed by	Written by	Original release date
1	"The Pharmacy"	John Addis	Steve Burge & Natalie Walter	22 September 2023
2	"The Dress"	John Addis	Steve Burge & Natalie Walter	22 September 2023
3	"The Date"	John Addis	Steven Burge, Bryce Hart & Natalie Walter	22 September 2023
4	"The Sleep Clinic"	John Addis	Steven Burge, Bryce Hart & Natalie Walter	29 September 2023
5	"Veggie Veggie Bing Bong"	John Addis	Steven Burge, Bryce Hart & Natalie Walter	6 October 2023
6	"The Road Trip"	John Addis	Steven Burge, Bryce Hart & Natalie Walter	13 October 2023
7	"The Horse"	John Addis	Steven Burge, Bryce Hart & Natalie Walter	20 October 2023
8	"The Wedding"	John Addis	Steven Burge, Bryce Hart & Natalie Walter	27 October 2023

== Production ==
It was announced in October 2022 that Apple TV+ had ordered the series, which had begun filming in London with Antonia Thomas and Craig Roberts cast to lead the series.

== Release ==
Apple announced the series would premiere its first three episodes on 22 September 2023.

== Reception ==
On the review aggregator website Rotten Tomatoes, 76% of 21 critics' reviews are positive, with an average rating of 6.4/10. Metacritic, which uses a weighted average, assigned the film a score of 61 out of 100, based on eight critics, indicating "generally favorable" reviews. TV critic Joel Golby, writing in The Guardian, described Still Up as "superb", "a genuine revelation" and his "scripted TV show of the year".
