= Close (2019 film) =

2019 UK film directed by Vicky Jewson

- Theatrical release poster
- Directed by: Vicky Jewson
- Written by: Vicky Jewson; Rupert Whitaker
- Produced by: Rupert Whitaker; Jason Newmark; Vicky Jewson
- Starring: Noomi Rapace; Sophie Nélisse; Indira Varma; Eoin Macken
- Cinematography: Malte Rosenfeld
- Edited by: Richard Smither
- Music by: Marc Canham
- Production companies: Piccadilly Pictures; Westend Films; Whitaker Media; Jewson Film
- Distributed by: Netflix
- Release date: January 18, 2019
- Running time: 94 minutes
- Country: United Kingdom
- Language: English
- Box office: $60,040

Close is a 2019 British action thriller film directed by Vicky Jewson and starring Noomi Rapace. Rapace's character is based on that of Jacquie Davis, one of the world's leading female bodyguards, whose clients have included J. K. Rowling, Nicole Kidman and members of the British royal family. The film was released on 18 January 2019 by Netflix.

== Plot ==
While in South Sudan on a routine mission, close protection officer Sam Carlson saves two journalists she is protecting when their vehicle is attacked by local insurgents.

Zoe Tanner, the troubled child and heir of recently deceased business tycoon Eric Tanner, discovers she has been left all of her father's shares in his company, Hassine Mining. This shocks and angers her stepmother, Rima Hassine, whose family founded the company and who has taken over Eric's position as CEO. Having succeeded in negotiating a billion dollar deal for phosphate mining in Zambia, Rima demands that Zoe accompany her to the family house in Morocco while she completes the deal.

Rima hires the female Sam to act as Zoe's bodyguard for the trip, as her previous, married, bodyguard was fired for having sex with Zoe. Upon arriving at the family's fortified kasbah, Zoe demands that Sam remain for the full time she has been paid, and stay the night. Later that evening the safehouse's security system is breached, locking the property down and trapping its inhabitants. Heavily armed intruders kill multiple members of the security team. The intruders make their way to Zoe's room, killing en route the head of security, Alik.

Zoe escapes with Sam, and they are picked up by responding police officers. Although the officers assure them they are being taken to a police station, Zoe (who speaks Arabic) overhears them discussing a private address and money. Sam fights and disarms the officers, but Zoe ends up shooting one of them with Sam's sidearm. The two escape on foot into Casablanca and take refuge in a hotel. News of the incident causes share prices in Hassine Mining to drop considerably, potentially enabling their competitor Sikong to steal the deal.

Sam promises to get Zoe out of the country and is later joined by her boss and former lover, Conall. Their escape plan is for the three of them to travel as a family to Tangier and take the ferry to Spain. They are ambushed at the hotel by men who kill Conall. Sam saves Zoe from being taken by brutally fighting and killing two of the men.

Unable to leave the country without passports, Sam and Zoe travel to Hassine Mining headquarters to meet Rima. There they witness her in the car park with one of the suspicious men from the hotel. They follow him to a local marina, but Sam is noticed and the two fight; Sam impales him with a large fishing hook. Looking through his wallet, Sam and Zoe discover he is a police officer and had Rima's login details for the house security system.

While meeting with the selling company, Rima is confronted by a member of the competitor Sikong, who makes further threats on Zoe. Sam and Zoe return to the abandoned safehouse, where Zoe discovers that Sam previously had a child whom she put up for adoption at 16. During a meeting to finalize the mining deal, Rima receives a notification that her phone has been accessed by the house security system, and she leaves without signing the mining deal. The house is surrounded by corrupt members of the police, who refuse to allow a detective from Casablanca working with Rima to enter.

Rima arrives by helicopter. She reveals to Zoe that she is being blackmailed by Sikong and that she is not responsible for the attempts on her life. She is attacked by the mercenaries and corrupt officers, although Zoe and Sam intervene and eventually save her. Sam is wounded in the wrist. With Zoe and Rima safe, and the threat over, Sam leaves to head home but promises Zoe she will call her daughter.

== Cast ==
- Noomi Rapace as Sam Carlson, a close protection officer (CPO) assigned to protect Zoe
- Sophie Nélisse as Zoe Tanner, the heiress to Hassine Mining and Rima's stepdaughter
- Indira Varma as Rima Hassine, the CEO of Hassine Mining and Zoe's stepmother.
- Eoin Macken as Conall Sinclair, Sam's superior and friend
- Akin Gazi as Alik, the head of security for Hassine Mining
- Mansour Badri as Damari, a corrupt senior Morocco National Police officer
- Abdesslam Bouhssini as Zuberi, a Morocco National Police detective working for Rima
- George Georgiou as Nabil, the leader of a group of mercenaries

== Production ==
Principal photography began in August 2017 and filming took place at Pinewood and on location in London, Casablanca and Marrakesh. The film was pre-sold by Westend Films to 11 territories at script stage in 2017. In 2018, Netflix acquired the distribution rights for the film.

== Release ==
The trailer was released on 3 January 2019, the film was released on 18 January 2019 by Netflix.

== Reception ==
=== Critical response ===
On the review aggregator website Rotten Tomatoes, 35% of 34 critics' reviews are positive, with an average rating of 5.4/10. The website's consensus reads: "Close puts a welcome female-fronted spin on the prototypical action thriller; unfortunately, the rest of the movie's ingredients are tediously predictable." Metacritic, which uses a weighted average, assigned the film a score of 51 out of 100, based on 8 critics, indicating "mixed or average" reviews.

=== Box office ===
Primarily a Netflix streaming release, Close did have a very limited theatrical release in international markets, grossing $60,400.
