= Natalie Walter =

British actress (born 1975)

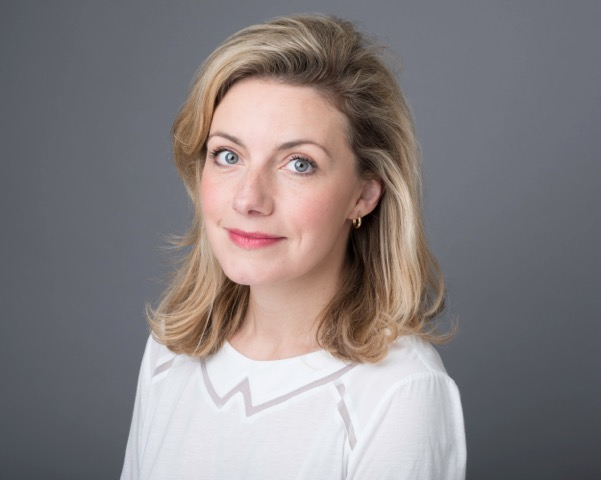
- Born: Woking, Surrey, England
- Education: Drama Centre, Royal Shakespeare Company
- Occupations: Actress, Writer
- Years active: 1996–present
- Known for: Acting, writing
- Notable work: Still Up
- Television: I May Destroy You, Horrible Histories, Family Tree

Natalie Walter is a British actress and writer who is best known for her film, television and theatre roles. During her career, Walter has worked with film and theatre directors including Peter Hall, Gregory Doran, Sam Mendes and Christopher Guest. Still Up, an eight-part comedy drama written and co-created by Walter, premiered on Apple TV+ in 2023. Her father was David Walter, the former BBC and ITN journalist.

== Education ==
Walter studied at London's Drama Centre, and later spent three years performing and touring with the Royal Shakespeare Company.

== Still Up ==
Walter is the co-creator, writer and associate producer of Still Up, an eight-part comedy drama made by Various Artists Limited for Apple TV+. The series premiered in September 2023 and stars Antonia Thomas, Craig Roberts and Blake Harrison. TV critic Joel Golby, writing in The Guardian, described Still Up as "superb", "a genuine revelation" and his "scripted TV show of the year".

== Television ==
As an actor, Walter's TV roles include Francine in I May Destroy You, which won three awards at the 2021 British Academy Television Awards, including for best mini-series. In the same year, Walter played Fizzy in Strike. Her other notable television appearances include in The Thin Blue Line, and Harry Enfield & Chums, the Doctor Who episode "Turn Left". the Jonathan Creek special "The Judas Tree", Above Suspicion, and Family Tree. Since 2015, Walter has been a regular performer on Horrible Histories.

Walter is the co-creator and writer of the 2023 comedy Apple TV+ comedy Still Up.

Year	Programme	Channel	Role
2025	The Death of Bunny Munro	Sky	Donna
2023	Still Up	Apple+	Co-creator and writer
2022	Breeders	Sky	Louise
2021	Bloods	Sky	Charlotte
2020	I May Destroy You	BBC / HBO	Francine
2020	Strike	BBC	Fizzy
2015, 2017	Horrible Histories	CBBC	Various
2013	Family Tree	HBO	Ellie
2011	Above Suspicion	ITV	Connie Short (series 3)
2010	Jonathan Creek	BBC	Emily
2008	Doctor Who	BBC	Alice Coltrane
2005	Hampstead Heath: the Musical	BBC	Tree Woman
2004	Hollywood Goddesses	Sky One	Tallulah Bankhead
2003	Doctors	BBC	Esther Peters
2001	Harry Enfield & Chums	BBC	Various characters
2000	The Peter Principle	BBC	Chloe
1998	The Ruth Rendell Mysteries	ITV	Tanya Paine
1998–99	Babes in the Wood	ITV	Caralyn Monroe
1998	The Stalker's Apprentice	STV	Karen Scott
1997	Get Well Soon	BBC	Beryl
1996	The Thin Blue Line	BBC	Elf

== Theatre ==
Walter's latest theatre role is playing Sybil Chase in a production of Noël Coward's Private Lives at the Ambassadors Theatre in London's West End, in which she stars opposite Nigel Havers and Patricia Hodge. Walter has previously worked with the director Sam Mendes at the Donmar Warehouse in a production of Alan Bennett's Habeas Corpus, was a member of the Peter Hall Company's production of As You Like It and featured in the National Theatre's revival of Noises Off. In 2008 to early 2009 she spent a year as a member of the Royal Shakespeare Company (RSC), with leading roles as Helena in A Midsummer Night's Dream and Maria in Love's Labour's Lost. She also appeared in the hit stage comedy 39 Steps, which ran in the West End for a record-breaking nine years. Walter played Heidi Schumann in Peter Nichols's play Lingua Franca which premiered in London in July 2010 before transferring to New York later in the year.

Year	Play	Theatre	Role	Director
2023	Private Lives	Ambassadors Theatre	Sybil Chase	Christopher Luscombe
2021	Private Lives	No1 Tour	Sybil Chase	Christopher Luscombe
2013	A Little House on the Side	Theatre Royal Bath	Marcelle	Lindsay Posner / Cal McCrystal
2011	Smash!	Menier Chocolate Factory	Liz	Tamara Harvey
2010	Lingua Franca	Finborough / 59E59 Theatre, NYC	Heidi Schumann	Michael Gielata
2010	50 Ways to Leave Your Love	Bush Theatre	Various characters	Josie Rourke
2010	The 39 Steps	Criterion Theatre	Various characters	Maria Aitken
2009	Hayfever	Chichester Festival Theatre	Tallulah	Nikolai Foster
2009	A Midsummer Night's Dream	Royal Shakespeare Company	Helena	Gregory Doran
2009	Love's Labour's Lost	Royal Shakespeare Company	Maria	Gregory Doran
2008	Whipping It Up	No1 Tour	Chloe	Terry Johnson
2008	Twelfth Night	Theatre Royal, Northampton	Olivia	Laurie Sansom
2007	Soap	Theatre Royal, Northampton	Noeleen	Laurie Sansom
2007	Piano / Forte	Royal Court	Dawn	Terry Johnson
2007	Dead Funny	West Yorkshire Playhouse	Karen	Matthew Lloyd
2006	Flanders Mare	Sound Theatre	Lisa	Alan Cox
2006	As You Like It	Theatre Royal, Bath / US Tour	Phoebe	Peter Hall
2004	The Constant Wife	Lyric, West End	Marie-Louise	Chris Luscombe
2001	Noises Off	National Theatre	Brooke	Jeremy Sams
2001	The Recruiting Officer	Chichester Festival Theatre	Rose	James Kerr
1996	Habeas Corpus	Donmar Warehouse	Felicity	Sam Mendes
1999	Genghis Among the Pygmies	Royal Court	Various	Simon Usher
1999	Ten Minutes of Human Rights	Royal Court	Various	Ramin Grey
1998	The Brazen Age	Shakespeare's Globe	Various	James Wallace
1998	The Bronze Age	Shakespeare's Globe	Various	James Wallace

== Film ==
Walter's most recent film role was starring in Family Secrets opposite Eric Dane. Walter's other film credits include Woody Allen's 2010 romantic comedy You Will Meet a Tall Dark Stranger, The Wedding Video, I Want Candy, Lady Godiva and Remember Me?.

Year	Film	Director
2025	Family Secrets	Malik Vitthal
2020	Regarding Annabelle	Gary Simpson
2020	The Last Tree on Earth	Ollie Dagois
2012	The Wedding Video	Nigel Cole
2012	Cockneys Vs Zombies	Mattias Hoene
2011	Huge	Ben Miller
2010	You Will Meet a Tall Dark Stranger	Woody Allen
2008	Lady Godiva	Vicky Jewson
2007	I Want Candy	Stephen Surjik
2002	Eddie Loves Mary	Hannah Rothschild
2002	The Honeytrap	Michael Gunther
1998	If Only	Maria Rippol
1997	Remember Me?	Nick Hurran

== Radio ==
Walter has appeared on a number of programmes on BBC Radio 4, including Seekers, House of the Spirit Levels, Smelling of Roses, No Commitments and All My Life. In 2010 she played multiple comic characters in The Lucy Montgomery Show which was written by and starred Lucy Montgomery.

Year	Programme	Station	Director
2015	Seekers	BBC Radio 4	Victoria Lloyd
2012	Kind Hearts and Coronets - Like Father, Like Daughter	BBC Radio 4	Frank Stirling
2010/11	The Lucy Montgomery Variety Pack	BBC Radio 4	Katie Tyrell
2009	Smelling of Roses	BBC Radio 4	Maria Esposito
2008	Chambers	BBC Radio 4	Paul Schlesinger
2007	No Commitments	BBC Radio 4	Maria Esposito
2003	All My Life	BBC Radio 4	Steve McCrum
2002	The House of the Spirit Levels	BBC Radio 4	Paul Schlesinger
