= Tim Lutkin =

British lighting designer (born 20th century)

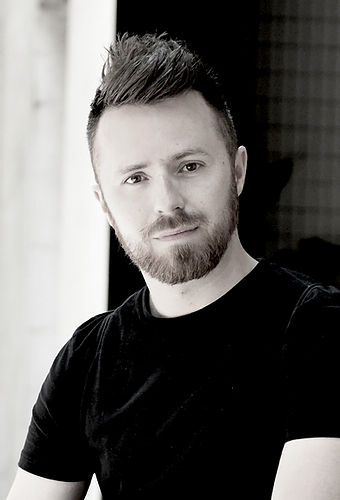
- Born: Beverley, England, U.K.
- Education: Guildhall School of Music and Drama
- Occupation(s): Creative Director and Lighting designer
- Website: timlutkin.co.uk

Tim Lutkin is an English Creative Director and lighting designer for theatre and live events.

== Early life and education ==
Tim Lutkin was born in Beverley, England. He moved to London in 2005. He graduated from the Guildhall School of Music and Drama.

== Career ==
Lutkin is a Creative Director and lighting designer for theatre, theme parks and live events.

Lutkin has designed for production companies, including the Royal National Theatre, The Walt Disney Company, the Royal Shakespeare Company, the Chichester Festival Theatre, the Almeida Theatre, and the Menier Chocolate Factory.

== Selected productions ==
- Life of PI (Wyndham's Theatre)
- Back to the Future: The Musical (Adelphi Theatre)
- Fiddler on the Roof (Playhouse Theatre)
- Big (musical) (Dominion Theatre and National Tour)
- Noises Off (Garrick Theatre)
- Chimerica (Harold Pinter Theatre and Almeida Theatre)
- Strangers on a Train (Gielgud Theatre)

== Awards and nominations ==
Year	Nominated work	Category	Result	Notes
2023	Life of Pi	Tony Award for Best Lighting Design in a Play	Won	
2022	Back to the Future: The Musical	WhatsOnStage Awards for Best Lighting Design	Won	
2022	Back to the Future: The Musical	Laurence Olivier Award for Best Lighting Design	Nominated	
2022	Life of Pi	Laurence Olivier Award for Best Lighting Design	Won	
2021	Life of Pi	BroadwayWorld UK Award for Best Lighting Design	Nominated	
2020	Present Laughter	WhatsOnStage Awards for Best Lighting Design	Nominated	
2019	Life of Pi	UK Theatre Awards for Best Design	Won	
2016	The Life of the Party	Theater Bay Area award for Outstanding Lighting Design	Won	
2014	Chimerica	Laurence Olivier Award for Best Lighting Design	Won	
2014	Strangers on a Train	WhatsOnStage Awards for Best Lighting Design	Nominated	
2014	The Crucible	Knight of Illumination Award for Best Lighting Design	Nominated	

== See also ==
- List of lighting designers
