= Luke Fetherston =

British actor

- Born: Luke Richard Fetherston; Glasgow, Scotland
- Education: ArtsEd
- Occupation: Actor
- Years active: 2010–present

Luke Richard Fetherston is a British actor who began his career on the West End.

== Early life ==
Fetherston was born in Glasgow and grew up in Hertfordshire and East London. At the age of 8, he was introduced to acting when his sister encouraged him to audition for a local theatre company. Fetherston went on to train at the Arts Educational Schools (ArtsEd) in West London.

== Career ==
At 18, Fetherston was scouted in central London to be a model which he continued alongside his acting career. Upon graduating drama school, Fetherston appeared in 42nd Street at Chichester Festival Theatre, White Christmas and Top Hat before making his West End debut in Singin' in the Rain at the Palace Theatre during the 2012 London Olympics. He was then cast in Cabaret directed by Rufus Norris, and subsequently cast in BBC Films London Road and Wonder.land for the Manchester International Festival. Fetherston then appeared in Funny Girl starring Sheridan Smith at the Savoy Theatre and Menier Chocolate Factory; he also featured on the official soundtrack. Also at the Menier Chocolate Factory, he appeared in She Loves Me before returning to Chichester Festival Theatre in 2017 for Fiddler on the Roof, in which he played Fyedka.

Fetherston was invited by Lynne Page to be an assistant choreographer and movement advisor for Renée Zellweger on the set of the 2018 biopic Judy. He made his television debut in 2019 with recurring role Fabio in the CBBC musical dramedy Almost Never and Harlan Fried in the CW science fiction series Pandora. He was promoted to the main cast of Pandora for its second season.

In 2022 Fetherston played Joel Foxworth in Flowers in the Attic: The Origin, a Lifetime miniseries prequel based on the novel Garden of Shadows. This was followed by a main role, Adam, in the Apple TV+ comedy Still Up. He has upcoming roles in the Channel 4 comedy Big Mood, and the third season of the Amazon Prime fantasy series The Wheel of Time.

== Filmography ==
Year	Title	Role	Notes
2000	Billy Elliot	Young Boxer	
2000	Jesus Christ Superstar	Young Disciple	
2015	London Road	TV Presenter	
2019–2020	Pandora	Harlan Fried	Recurring role (season 1); 3 episodes Main role (season 2); 8 episodes
2019–2021	Almost Never	Fabio	27 episodes
2020	The Emily Atack Show	Various	3 episodes
2022	Flowers in the Attic: The Origin	Joel Foxworth	Miniseries
2023	Still Up	Adam	Main role
2023	Doctor Who	The Toymaker dance double	Episode: "The Giggle"
2024	Big Mood	Ryan	Main role
2025	The Wheel of Time	Gawyn Trakand	Main role (season 3)
2025	Picture This	Jay	in Prime video release

== Stage ==
Year	Title	Role	Notes
2010	42nd Street	Bobby	Chichester Festival Theatre, Chichester
2012	Singin' in the Rain	Diction Coach	Palace Theatre, London
2015	Cabaret	Victor	New Wimbledon Theatre, London
2015	Follies	Company	Royal Albert Hall, London
2016	Wonder.land	Keiran / Lizard	The National Theatre, London
2016	Funny Girl	Ensemble	Savoy Theatre / Menier Chocolate Factory, London
2017	Fiddler on the Roof	Fyedka	Chichester Festival Theatre, Chichester
