= Lady Godiva (2008 film) =

- Film poster
- Directed by: Vicky Jewson
- Written by: Vicky Jewson
- Produced by: Adam Kempton; Rupert Whitaker
- Starring: Phoebe Thomas; Matthew Chambers; Natalie Walter
- Cinematography: George Stephenson
- Edited by: George Akers
- Music by: David Sinclair Whitaker
- Production company: Jewson Film Productions
- Distributed by: Miracle Communications
- Release date: 22 January 2008
- Running time: 89 minutes
- Country: United Kingdom
- Language: English
- Budget: £1.4 million

Lady Godiva is a 2008 British romantic comedy film written and directed by Vicky Jewson. The film, starring Phoebe Thomas, Matthew Chambers, and Natalie Walter, was shot in 2006 but went unreleased for two years. Based on the historic tale of Lady Godiva, it was set in modern-day Oxford.

== Plot ==
Jemima Honey, a teacher, needs to raise funds for her local creative arts centre. To do so, she accepts the challenge of businessmen and love interest Michael Bartle to ride through the streets of Oxford nude.

== Cast ==
- Phoebe Thomas as Jemima Honey/Lady Godiva
- Matthew Chambers as Michael Bartle
- Natalie Walter as Susie
- James Wilby as Earl of Mercia, Leofric
- Isabelle Amyes as Mrs. Bartle
- Lara Cazalet as Esclairmonde
- Freddie Stroma as Matt
- Julia Verdin as Veronica
- Simon Williams as Rupert

== Reception ==
The film was panned by critics, with criticism mostly focusing on its script and direction. Rob Daniel of Sky Movies wrote that 'all involved should be sent straight to the glue factory', Ellen E Jones of Total Film advised that viewers 'Avoid like you would a naked nutter bouncing down the street', Hannah Forbes Black of Film4 described it as 'relentlessly awful to the point of unintentional comedy, this Godiva would do well to get off the horse and put her clothes back on' and Total Film highlighted 'clunky direction' and a 'hokey script'.
