= Girls' Night =

1998 film by Nick Hurran

- Film poster
- Directed by: Nick Hurran
- Written by: Kay Mellor
- Produced by: Bill Boyes
- Starring: Julie Walters; Brenda Blethyn
- Cinematography: David Odd
- Edited by: John Richards
- Music by: Edward Shearmur
- Production company: Granada Film
- Distributed by: Granada Film
- Release dates: 13 February 1998 (Berlinale); 26 June 1998 (UK)
- Running time: 102 minutes
- Country: United Kingdom
- Language: English
- Budget: $4.5 million
- Box office: $1.5 million

Girls' Night is a 1998 British comedy-drama directed by Nick Hurran. Loosely based upon the real experiences of writer Kay Mellor, the film stars Julie Walters and Brenda Blethyn as two sisters-in-law and best friends, one dying of cancer, who fulfil a lifelong dream of going to Las Vegas, Nevada, after an unexpected jackpot win on the bingo.

Premiered to a mixed response by critics at the 1998 Sundance Film Festival, who noted it a "rather formulaic tearjerker [with] two powerhouse Brit actresses", Hurran won a Silver Spire at the San Francisco International Film Festival and received a Golden Bear nomination at the 48th Berlin International Film Festival for his work.

== Plot ==
Set in a working class town in the North of England, Jackie Simpson and Dawn Wilkinson have been life-long best friends and in-laws, as Dawn is married to Jackie's brother Steve. The two women work together side-by-side in a factory, and have a girls’ night every Friday.

One Friday night, in the bingo hall while Jackie is having a dalliance with the manager, Paul, Dawn wins the Bingo jackpot, £100,000. As they always split their winnings, Jackie is due to get £50,000, so she happily cleans out her things, leaving her husband Dave the house keys with a note saying that he can keep the house. Jackie surprises her lover with her belongings, hoping to stay awhile.

The next day, clashing with the foreman, Jackie gets sacked. Shortly after, Dawn collapses and is rushed to the hospital. Undergoing a barrage of tests, they discover she has cancer again (she'd had breast cancer some years ago). The oncologist tells her they want to immediately put her on a course of radiation therapy. When Steve picks her up, she says nothing, but arriving home, seeing her teenagers playfighting, she inexplicably starts crying.

That Friday, the sisters-in-law go to the bingo party to collect the cheque. When asked what she will do with the money, Jackie quips in the idea of a trip to Las Vegas. Dave brings her a document officially getting her off the mortgage. Jackie then finds out that Dawn had been in hospital.

On Monday, Dawn is off the line at work and given a simpler task usually given to young people, a more isolating job. Steve gives Jackie a cheque for only £35,000 (instead of the £50,000 Dawn had promised her). After the second course of radiotherapy, Dawn vomits and begins to lose hair. She announces that she will pack it in at work.

Jackie and Paul break it off when she discovers that he has also been having a relationship with someone else. He is frustrated that she had essentially moved in a month ago. Steve comes across Jackie as she is wheeling away with her suitcases, looking for help with Dawn. Dawn's hair is sparse and she looks terrible, but she refuses to admit what is going on. Jackie marches down to the hospital, insisting she speak with Dawn’s doctor. She discovers that Dawn is now refusing more treatment, as it is not reducing her brain tumour.

Jackie pops by Dawn's, whisking her away to an adventure in Las Vegas. In her first few minutes at the slot machines, Dawn hits the jackpot. Not prepared for such a big payout, Cody loans her his cowboy hat. She calls Steve that night to tell him they are having a blast in Las Vegas. Cody invites them to spend a day exploring Nevada on horseback. Beforehand, Dawn wins again at the roulette table. After they split the over $500, Jackie chastises her for giving up.

The duo go trail riding with Cody by his Nevada ranch. Afterwards Jackie is dropped off at the hotel, and Dawn stays out for a bit (with Jackie hopeful that Dawn has a fling). Dawn does not and decides that she wants to end their trip.

Back at home, Jackie nurses Dawn and apologizes to Dave. Jackie gives a eulogy at Dawn’s funeral. At the wake at home, the family finds gifts for them under the bed. Her message to Jackie from the grave is Cody's cowboy hat, so she returns to him in Nevada.

== Cast ==
- Julie Walters as Jackie Simpson
- Brenda Blethyn as Dawn Wilkinson
- Kris Kristofferson as Cody
- Philip Jackson as Dave Simpson
- George Costigan as Steve Wilkinson
- Anthony Lewis as Mathew Wilkinson
- Maxine Peake as Sharon
- James Gaddas as Paul
- Judith Barker as Helen
- Sue Cleaver as Rita
- Meera Syal as Carmen
- Sophie Stanton as Jane
- Fine Time Fontayne as Ken
- Brent Huff as Bobby Joe
- Nigel Whitmey as Tyrone
- Kathryn Hunt as Nurse

== Reception ==
The film grossed £0.7 million ($1.2 million) in the United Kingdom and $1.5 million worldwide.
