= Vicky Jewson =

English film producer, director (born 1985)

- Born: 18 September 1985 (age 40); Oxford, England, UK
- Education: Wychwood School
- Years active: 2008–present
- Spouse(s): Rupert Whitaker (m. 20??)
- Website: www.jewsonfilm.com

Vicky Jewson (born 18 September 1985) is an English screenwriter, producer and film director.

Jewson was born in Oxford, where she still lives. She became interested in making films as a child, and took a five-day course with the Oxford Film and Video Makers at the age of 16.

She heads the production company Jewson Film along with producer Rupert Whitaker.

== Films ==
Her first film, Lady Godiva, an updated version of the legend, was filmed in Oxford and Carcassonne instead of the traditional Coventry after Jewson raised money from friends to fund making it. It was released in January 2008 and panned by critics. On 19 May that year, coinciding with the film's release on DVD, Jewson organised a charity fund raising event for Maggie's by sponsoring women to ride naked or almost naked through London's Hyde Park.

Jewson's following film, Born of War, a thriller, was co-written by Jewson and Rupert Whitaker and released in 2015.

In January 2018, Jewson's Close, based on the life of the female bodyguard Jacquie Davis, was released and picked up by Netflix. It stars Noomi Rapace and Sophie Nelisse. Jewson again co-wrote the script with Whitaker, to whom she is married.

== Filmography ==
Film

Year	Title	Director	Writer	Producer	Editor
2008	Lady Godiva	Yes	Yes	No	No
2014	Born of War	Yes	Story	No	Yes
2019	Close	Yes	Yes	Yes	No
2026	Pretty Lethal	Yes	No	No	No

Executive producer

- I am Chut Wutty (2015)
- Pretty Lethal (2026)

Television

Year	Title	Director	Producer	Writer	Notes
2022	The Witcher: Blood Origin	Yes	No	No	3 episodes
2026	Crumbs	Yes	Yes	Story	

== Awards ==
In 2006, for her work on Lady Godiva, Jewson won the Arts, Media and Culture category of the first Woman of the Future awards.
