= Kite runner =

Kite runner may refer to:

- Kite running, the practice of chasing kites that have been cut loose in kite fighting
- The Kite Runner, a 2003 novel by Khaled Hosseini
- The Kite Runner (film), a 2007 film based on Hosseini's novel
- Kite Runner (play), a stage play based on Hosseini's novel
- Nickname for Aquilonifer, genus of arthropods
