= Wingman (Person of Interest) =

- Person of Interest episode
- Episode no.: Season 4 Episode 3
- Directed by: Frederick E. O. Toye
- Written by: Amanda Segel
- Cinematography by: David Insley
- Editing by: Scott Powell
- Production code: 3J5403
- Original air date: October 7, 2014
- Running time: 43 minutes

Guest appearances
- Ryan O'Nan as Andre Cooper; Monique Gabriela Curnen as Captain Moreno; Jason Pendergraft as Mickey; Jamie Jackson as Janis

Episode chronology
← Previous "Nautilus"	Next → "Brotherhood"

"Wingman" is the 3rd episode of the fourth season of the American television drama series Person of Interest. It is the 71st overall episode of the series and is written by co-executive producer Amanda Segel and directed by Frederick E. O. Toye. It aired on CBS in the United States and on CTV in Canada on October 7, 2014.

The series revolves around a computer program for the federal government known as "The Machine" that is capable of collating all sources of information to predict terrorist acts and to identify people planning them. A team, consisting of John Reese, Harold Finch and Sameen Shaw follow "irrelevant" crimes: lesser level of priority for the government. However, their security and safety is put in danger following the activation of a new program named Samaritan. In the episode, the team investigates a wingman who may be connected to a murder so Fusco goes undercover as a client. Meanwhile, Reese is pressured by the new Captain to put a more respectable performance at his job while Finch helps Root with some tasks for the Machine. The title refers to "Wingman", a role that a person may take when a friend needs support with approaching potential romantic partners.

According to Nielsen Media Research, the episode was seen by an estimated 9.64 million household viewers and gained a 1.6/5 ratings share among adults aged 18–49. The episode received positive reviews, with critics praising the humor and performances (particularly Kevin Chapman) although the pace and lack of plot momentum received a more mixed response.

== Plot ==
Reese (Jim Caviezel) shoots a drug dealer in the streets after a pursuit with Fusco (Kevin Chapman). However, the precinct's new Captain, Moreno (Monique Gabriela Curnen) reprimands Reese for failing to stick to the police protocol and warns him to be more responsible on the job. After being told off by Fusco, Reese begins quickly catching killers legally, but uses some of his more questionable skills to identify them.

Finch (Michael Emerson) contacts Reese to work on their new number: Andre Cooper (Ryan O'Nan), a "wingman"-a professional "social liaison" who helps other men find dates. Due to Reese wanting to avoid problems and focus on a murder case, Fusco goes undercover as a client for Cooper. When Cooper tries to flirt with a woman, her boyfriend Mickey (Jason Pendergraft) tries to punch Cooper before being subdued by Fusco, who blows his cover. Despite this, Cooper intends to continue helping Fusco. In an art gallery, Shaw (Sarah Shahi) recognizes hitmen and Fusco and Cooper flee. However, Mickey intercepts them and takes them in a van.

Meanwhile, Root (Amy Acker) asks Finch for help in another task for the Machine. Pretending to be a famed underworld scavenger and his assistant, they purchase a black-market AT4 anti-tank weapon. Afterward, they are led to another black-market exchange with a Latvian mob to sell the launcher. At the last second, Finch breaks character, triggering a standoff that Root resolves by shooting the mobsters in the knees and tipping off the police.

Reese and Shaw obtain the location of the van but Reese can't go due to working on several unsolved cases for Moreno and blowing his cover will alert Samaritan. At the location, Cooper confesses to Fusco that Mickey was involved with the mob on Howland Hook Marine Terminal and the District Attorney asked Cooper to testify against him, but Cooper has refused. They are put in a shipping container but are saved by Shaw, Bear and Reese, who turns out to be investigating the murder that Cooper had witnessed. They manage to subdue the captors and bring them to the precinct, earning Moreno's respect. Cooper agrees to testify against Mickey and also helps Fusco with a date. The episode ends as Root shows Finch what the Machine provided for them: duffel bags full of money and weaponry to provide the team ongoing funding for their work.

== Reception ==
=== Viewers ===
In its original American broadcast, "Wingman" was seen by an estimated 9.64 million household viewers and gained a 1.6/5 ratings share among adults aged 18–49, according to Nielsen Media Research. This means that 1.6 percent of all households with televisions watched the episode, while 5 percent of all households watching television at that time watched it. This was a 11% decrease in viewership from the previous episode, which was watched by 10.72 million viewers with a 1.8/6 in the 18-49 demographics. With these ratings, Person of Interest was the third most watched show on CBS for the night, behind NCIS: New Orleans and NCIS, second on its timeslot and seventh for the night in the 18-49 demographics, behind Agents of S.H.I.E.L.D., The Flash, Chicago Fire, NCIS: New Orleans, The Voice, and NCIS.

With Live +7 DVR factored in, the episode was watched by 13.75 million viewers with a 2.7 in the 18-49 demographics.

=== Critical reviews ===
"Wingman" received positive reviews from critics. Matt Fowler of IGN gave the episode a "great" 8.2 out of 10 rating and wrote in his verdict, "'Wingman' didn't deliver some of the usual Samaritan-related intensity we've grown accustomed to on the show lately, but for a lighter episode it still all managed to converge together in a totally satisfying way. And Fusco's line to Shaw - 'I think I know who's gonna kill our guy' - was great. In the end, Reese and Fusco came to understand each other a little better, Finch came to re-appreciate The Machine a bit more, and Shaw was rescued from a life of Two Buck Chuck."

Alexa Planje of The A.V. Club gave the episode a "B" grade and wrote, "The episode isn't awful by any means, but its message is delivered in a manner that's simultaneously too muddled and straightforward. The depth and spark of the show's best episodes are missing in 'Wingman.' Still, the episode does explore some themes important to the series, however lightly."

Sean McKenna of TV Fanatic gave the episode a 4.2 star rating out of 5 and wrote "This was the right type of episode to place after the first two intense hours of Person of Interest Season 4. I can only imagine what other adventures Fusco will get into this season."
