= Khush Singh =

American film producer, director, businesswoman, CEO

Khush Mehta
- Born: September 15, 1975 (age 51); Ahmedabad, Gujarat
- Occupations: make-up artist, producer, director, businesswoman, CEO

Khush Singh (born September 15, 1975) is an Indian-born American make-up artist, producer, director, and businesswoman. She is the CEO of mKarma Cosmetics. and Karma Portfolios. Her products are sold in over 1000 stores in five countries in Southeast Asia and the US.

== Biography ==
Khush graduated from Florida International University and promptly delved into the entertainment industry as an independent director and TV News Reporter for TV Asia. She returned to the New York in 1999 to focus on other artistic endeavours and explore the possibility of creating a line of cosmetics for South Asians. The brand debuted in Toronto at the Canadian Cosmetics Show. The success of that initial makeup line led to the development and launch of the Indian line Khush in 2006.

In addition to creating cover looks for magazines, celebrities and make-up for fashion shows, Khush has been the key makeup artist on several TV shows and pilots. She is the author of two books: The Asian women: Beauty and Glamour and The Eyes have it! Khush describes her makeup passion as that of: "My work is driven by a passion yearning to be released onto a canvas."

== Film ==
Khush has also produced and directed several shorts, reality TV shows and movies under the banner of her production company mKarma including Faces, Choices, A Legacy Lost, TV Asia (TV Series), Day Care Diaries (TV Series), Mom's Cooking (TV Series – Makeup) and the critically acclaimed The Bicycle.

Khush has produced her first feature along with Michael Wechsler, Jonathan Sanger and Rick Porras called The Red Robin

== Filmography & Television ==
Year	Film/TV	Role	Notes
1999	Faces	Writer/Director	Short
2000	Light it up	director, Producer	Feature
2000–2004	TV Asia: Interview Specials	Interviewer	Television
2002	Trouble and Style	Makeup Artist, Stylist	Feature
2003	Choices	Director, writer, producer	Feature
2004	The Wedding	Director, writer, producer	Feature
2006	Ancient Art	Writer, director	Documentary
2007	And Then There Was You	Director, writer	Short
2009	Mom's Cooking	Producer	Feature
2011	One Day	Producer	Feature
2011	Luzia	Producer	Feature
2012	The Red Robin	Producer	Feature
2013	"Chemistry"	Producer	Feature
2013	"Chu & Blossom"	Producer	Feature
2013	"52 Hertz"	Executive Producer	Documentary

=== Personal life ===
Khush lives in New Jersey with her children, Ishi, Ari, and Ana and has houses in Toronto, Dubai, Mumbai, California and upstate New York.

== Books ==
- Khush Singh Beauty: The Asian Women: Beauty and Glamour (2005)
- Khush Singh Beauty: The Eyes Have It! (2007)
