= The Kite Runner (play) =

Play written by Matthew Spangler

- Original language: English
- Written by: Matthew Spangler

Premiere
- Date: 2009
- Place: San Jose Repertory Theatre, San Jose, California

The Kite Runner is a stage adaption of Afghan-American novelist Khaled Hosseini's 2003 book The Kite Runner. Aside from sharing the 2003 book as a source, it is unrelated to the 2007 film The Kite Runner. The play was adapted for the stage by Matthew Spangler and premiered at San Jose Repertory Theatre in 2009.

A Broadway production starring Amir Arison as Amir and featuring Azita Ghanizada as Soraya, Eric Sirakian as Hassan/Sohrab, and Faran Tahir as Baba opened to very mixed reviews at the Hayes Theater on July 21, 2022. A national tour of the Broadway production by the same producers and director launched in 2024; starring Ramzi Khalaf as Amir, and featuring Awesta Zarif as Soraya, Shahzeb Zahid Hussain as Hassan/Sohrab, and Haythem Noor as Baba.

== Description ==
The fast-paced play depicts most of what happens in the book. As in the book, The Kite Runner is narrated by Amir, who is obsessed with an "unatoned sin" he committed as a well-off child in 1970s Kabul: Amir betrayed his childhood friend, servant, and kite running partner Hassan when Amir's cowardice, and his desperate need to please his father, cause him to abandon Hassan in the face of a vicious and shocking attack by a neighborhood bully. In 2001, Amir has settled in America when he receives a call telling him: "There is a way to be good again." He then takes a dangerous trip, on the eve of the American invasion, into Taliban-controlled Kabul.

== Reception ==
=== Broadway ===
The Broadway production, directed by Giles Croft opened on 21 July 2022 and ran through 30 October 2022 at the Helen Hayes Theater was received with very mixed critical reviews.

The New York Times Maya Phillips called the production "stiff" and lead actor Amir Arison's performance "spotty": Under Giles Croft's direction, Arison's Broadway debut proves spotty. He recites his opening lines with the stiffness of a child delivering a book report, and never totally eases into the role... The part would be tough work for any actor; Amir is onstage for the entire show, and the transitions between his middle-aged and younger selves, some three decades apart, require the kind of gymnastics that not every performer can stick."

Chris Jones of The New York Daily News referred to Croft's production as being "underwhelming... [with] overtly presentational direction... [and] mostly a disappointment." Also pointing out "a strange flatness" to Spangler's adaptation. "Everything is too slow, too ponderous and, in the case of all of the actors playing multiple roles, their confusing trajectories were insufficiently thought out by the director."

Charles Isherwood of The Wall Street Journal commented on Spangler's adaptation: "With the help of a superlative cast, led by Amir Arison, playing the central role of a character also named Amir, and lucid direction by Giles Croft, the Broadway production brings the largely gripping narrative to life, even if it cannot fully capture the textured complexity of Mr. Hosseini's writing."

In his review for Deadline, Greg Evans states the production "seeming more like an elaborately staged reading... an audio book come to life... tells the story (and tells is the operative word)."

In The New Yorker, Elizabeth Vincentelli noted the "production does well, for the most part, by the source material, even if it can be frustratingly earthbound."

New York Theatre Guide's Diep Tran noted the adaptation is faithful to a fault, "...Toward the end of the play, Amir kneels down in prayer, his arms out and hands outstretched... So much is unspoken in Arison's inflections and body language: his desperation, sadness, and guilt. If only The Kite Runner on Broadway depended less on the novel and trusted more on its stagecraft. There might have been more moments like this, of flight and transcendence."

Marilyn Stasio in their Variety review praised the production and Spangler's adaptation as being "a heartbreaker – but so uplifting, it's worth the pain."

The New York Post reviewed the production as being "straightforward, to-the-point play, but one that's easy to embrace and gripping as it unfurls."

The Daily Beast criticized the hateful portrayal of a gay character referring to the production as "homophobic trash", stating the production "contains many, perhaps unintended, narratives about masculinity, sexuality, and intimacy it does not have the will, or maybe courage or depth, to confront." Also noting the play's only significant female character, Soraya, played by (Azita Ghanizada), "is mostly sidelined, which is a shame because Ghanizada brings some much-needed life and sharpness to a frustratingly underwritten part."

=== Earlier productions ===
The San Francisco Chronicle pointed out in 2009 that Spangler spends the whole first act on the first quarter of the novel, giving the remainder "a kind of CliffsNotes rush". The Globe and Mail gave a 2009 production 3 out of 4 stars, calling it "a ripping good yarn", but "dangerously simplistic about modern-day Afghanistan".

The Financial Times gave a 2013 production 3 out of 5 stars, stating that "the novel roams through decades and across continents, is brilliantly evocative and is written in the first person ... while this structure works so well on the page, on stage it always makes for a slightly awkward experience, in which the characters appear in short illustrative episodes, rather than driving the story."

In the UK, a Nottingham Playhouse Theatre Company production, directed by Giles Croft, was shortlisted for the 2014 Best Regional Production in the WhatsOnStage Awards, but lost to a production of Oliver!.

The production transferred to the Wyndham's Theatre in the West End in December 2016, where it played a limited run until 11 March 2017. The production returned to the West End at the Playhouse Theatre on 8 June 2017, and played a limited run to 26 August.

== Future Productions ==
=== UK & Ireland Tour (2024) ===
The play will run a tour of 16 venues in the UK and Ireland, opening in March at the Waterside Theatre in Aylesbury, then going on to play the Richmond Theatre, Theatre Royal in Bath, Chester Storyhouse, Gaiety Theatre in Dublin, Glasgow's Theatre Royal, Nottingham Playhouse, Liverpool Playhouse, Oxford Playhouse, The Lowry in Salford, Yvonne Arnaud Theatre in Guildford, Malvern's Festival Theatre, Sheffield Lyceum, Brighton Theatre Royal, Newcastle's Theatre Royal, and finishing in Cheltenham's Everyman Theatre in early July.

=== North American Tour (2024) ===
The play will run a tour visiting 21 US cities including Chicago, Charlotte, West Palm Beach and Washington, DC. The tour opened on April 9, 2024 at ASU Gammage in Tempe, AZ.
