= Altered Minds =

2013 American psychological thriller film

- Theatrical release poster
- Directed by: Michael Z. Wechsler
- Written by: Michael Z. Wechsler
- Produced by: Shawn Singh; Jonathan Sanger; Rick Porras; Wendy Herst; Khush Singh; Terry Keefe
- Starring: Judd Hirsch; Ryan O'Nan; C.S. Lee; Jaime Ray Newman; Dennis Flanagan; Caroline Lagerfelt; Joseph Lyle Taylor; Jake Miller; Lily Pilblad
- Cinematography: Adrian Correia
- Edited by: Tom Swartwout
- Music by: Edmund Choi
- Production company: Rowish Entertainment
- Distributed by: Gravitas Ventures
- Release dates: August 24, 2013 (Montreal); November 20, 2015 (United States)
- Running time: 92 minutes
- Country: United States
- Language: English

Altered Minds (originally titled The Red Robin) is a 2013 psychological thriller film directed by Michael Z. Wechsler and starring Judd Hirsch, Ryan O'Nan, C.S. Lee, Caroline Lagerfelt, Jaime Ray Newman, Joseph Lyle Taylor, Dennis Flanagan, Jake Miller, and Lily Pilblad.

== Plot ==
75-year-old Dr. Nathaniel Shellner has led an extraordinary life as a psychiatrist, working with traumatized patients fleeing war zones in refugee camps, earning himself a Nobel Prize for his work. After having one child, Leonard, with his wife, Lillian, the Shellners elect to adopt the remainder of their family from the camps where Dr. Shellner worked. Ultimately, the Shellners incorporated three children from all over the world into their family – Tommy, Julie, and Harry. As Dr. Shellner lies on his death bed on a frigid, icy day on the fringes of New York City in suburban New Jersey, the family convenes at the house where the couple raised the children for a final, bittersweet farewell to a sensational and inspiring public figure. Or, that's the idea, until all hell breaks loose after Tommy arrives and accuses his father of adopting his children, not out of concern for their future well-being, but to use them for some warped psychological experiment.

The proceedings from Tommy's accusation forward during the remainder of the evening offer a cocktail of incidents between the family members own interpersonal issues and a relentless exploration of the clues Tommy manufactures as evidence of his father's alleged wrongdoing. The allegations not only stun the family, they stir up anger and resentment, not only because of Dr. Shellner's failing health, but also because he has been held up as a paragon of selflessness and virtue not only within the family but from all his public recognition and numerous awards he was festooned with. As Tommy relentlessly pursues his own 'evidence' of his father's ostensible experiments with his children's minds and feelings, he simultaneously stirs up a whole load of simmering resentments, shifting alliances, and old traumas form the family's internal relations and dynamics.

== Cast ==
- Judd Hirsch as Dr. Nathaniel Shellner
- C.S. Lee as Harry Shellner
- Ryan O'Nan as Tommy Shellner
- Joseph Lyle Taylor as Leonard Shellner
- Jaime Ray Newman as Julie Shellner
- Caroline Lagerfelt as Lillian
- Jake Miller as Sasha Shellner
- Lily Pilblad as Sylvia Shellner
- Hayden Signoretti as Young Tommy

== Release ==
The film had its world premiere at the Montreal World Film Festival then titled The Red Robin, on August 24, 2013. Gravitas Ventures acquired the distribution rights to the film in September 2015, and was released on November 20, 2015 as a limited release and through video on demand.

== Reception ==
The film holds a rating of 50% on Rotten Tomatoes, based on 8 reviews, with an average rating of 5.9/10.
