= Kites in Palestinian culture =

Children flying kites in Karmei Tsur (2011)

Kites have been part of Palestinian culture in various forms, serving both as an artistic medium through their designs and as a popular pastime, particularly among children and young people. Their ability to be flown peacefully in the open air has also made them recurring symbols of protest and political expression.

== History ==
=== 20th century ===
A boy wearing a fez and holding a kite in Jaffa, British Mandate of Palestine (1921-1923)

Flying kites has been a common practice in Palestine and in other parts of the Middle East, although its cultural, artistic, and political significance has varied across regions. In the early 1920s, Dutch photographer Frank Scholten photographed children flying kites in Jaffa during the British Mandate of Palestine.

Suad Amiry's historical novel Mother of Strangers, set in Jaffa in 1947, depicts kite-making and kite-flying as a popular pastime among Jaffans and other communities along the Palestinian coast.

During the First Intifada (1987–1993), kite flying continued among Palestinian children and young people in both Gaza and the West Bank. Palestinian accounts from the period describe children making kites by hand and, in some cases, decorating them with Palestinian national symbols. Ramzy Baroud, who grew up in the Nuseirat refugee camp, recalled that swimming in the sea and flying kites were among the few ways children could escape the summer heat. He wrote that access to the beach was restricted during the uprising and that, although his home was only a short walk from the sea, he went more than seven years without visiting it. As a result, kite flying became his community's preferred pastime. Personal accounts from the period also illustrate the political associations that kites could acquire. In Peaceful Resistance: Building a Palestinian University Under Occupation (2010), Gabriel Baramki recounts an episode related by Marwan Awartani, whose five-year-old son was flying a multicoloured paper kite outside their home in the West Bank when an Israeli soldier mistook it for a Palestinian flag. The child was subsequently taken into a military jeep and questioned before being released.

Kite flying also remained part of children's everyday lives during the Second Intifada (2000–2005). In an oral history discussed by Amal Bishara, a Palestinian man from Nablus recalled making kites during his childhood under siege and writing a prayer on one of them before flying it. Such accounts suggest that kite flying could simultaneously serve as recreation, personal expression and, in some contexts, a symbolic response to the conditions of occupation.

=== 21st century ===
By the early 2000s, kite flying was well established as a children's pastime in Gaza. In a 2003 report for The New York Times, journalist James Bennet described children making kites from coloured tissue paper and discarded schoolwork and flying them along the Gaza coast. During an Israeli military incursion into Beit Hanoun, some children flew kites in the colours of the Palestinian flag from their homes, attempting to land them on Israeli tanks.

== Cultural significance ==
=== Protest and international political symbolism ===
A child flying a kite with the text "Free Palestine" at a pro-Palestinian demonstration in Richardson, Texas in 2024

The use of kites in Gaza has also acquired a political dimension, especially due to the events during the Israeli-Palestinian conflict. Reports of Palestinian children being killed by Israeli fire, including incidents involving children flying kites, have contributed to the association of kites with the experience of the conflict. Since then, the image of the kite has been used in solidarity actions outside Palestine in several cities around the world, both in demonstrations and in organized kite-flying events supporting Palestinians.

In September 2026, demonstrations in several Dutch cities brought together protesters to fly kites with symbols linked to Palestine.

=== Israeli restrictions and bans ===
In 2026, restrictions on kite flying were tightened in Palestinian territories near the Israeli border. Israeli authorities consider kites a potential threat to their airspace, viewing them as possible carriers of incendiary or explosive materials, or any material that could be used as a weapon against their national security. In August of that year, Israeli Prime Minister Benjamin Netanyahu issued a statement warning about the use of balloons, kites, and drones in Israeli airspace originating from Palestinian territories, assuring that they are not being used for recreational purposes. Also along those lines, Israeli Defense Minister Israel Katz announced that there could be eventual reprisals if objects from Palestine fly over Israeli airspace. These decisions were justified because previously, Israel received attacks from incendiary kites originating from Palestinian territories that caused damage in Israeli territory, different from the historical recreational use that has been given to it.

== Art and popular culture ==
=== Film ===
The 2013 documentary film Flying Paper, directed by Nitin Sawhney and Roger Hill, follows Palestinian children and young people in the Gaza Strip as they make and fly kites. The film documents kite-making as part of youth culture in Gaza and focuses on a mass kite-flying event organized in 2010, when thousands of children gathered to attempt a world record.

== See also ==
- Palestinian airborne arson attacks
- Thai kites
