= Echoes of War (film) =

- Theatrical Poster
- Directed by: Kane Senes
- Written by: Kane Senes, John Chriss
- Produced by: Dave Szamet; Steven J. Berger; Kyle Fischer; Kane Senes; John Chriss; J.M.R. Luna
- Starring: James Badge Dale; Ethan Embry; William Forsythe; Maika Monroe; Rhys Wakefield; Owen Teague; Ryan O'Nan; Beth Broderick
- Cinematography: Wes Cardino
- Edited by: Arndt Peemoeller
- Music by: Hanan Townshend
- Production companies: American Film Productions; Provenance Pictures; Country Club Pictures
- Distributed by: Echo Bridge Entertainment
- Release dates: April 15, 2015 (Dallas International Film Festival); May 15, 2015 (United States)
- Running time: 104 minutes
- Country: United States
- Language: English

Echoes of War is a 2015 American Western psychological thriller film written by Kane Senes and John Chriss and directed by Kane Senes. The film stars James Badge Dale as a Confederate soldier who returns home from the American Civil War, bringing his demons back with him. It also stars Ethan Embry, William Forsythe, Maika Monroe, Rhys Wakefield, Beth Broderick, Ryan O'Nan and Owen Teague.

The film had its world premiere at the Dallas International Film Festival on April 15, 2015, where it won a Special Jury Prize for Best Ensemble Cast. It had a limited theatrical release on May 15, 2015, via AMC Theatres.

== Synopsis ==
In post-Civil War Texas, two neighboring families are grieving tragic losses while they struggle to survive. The cattle-ranching McCluskeys have lost both a son and their entire herd to the war. The Rileys, mourning the loss of wife and mother Mary to illness, eke out a living trapping animals and selling their pelts. When Wade Riley returns from fighting in the American Civil War, he discovers that Randolph McCluskey and family have been stealing animals from his family's traps. He decides to take matters into his own hands, sparking yet another war that quickly escalates out of control.

== Cast ==
- James Badge Dale as Wade Riley
- Ethan Embry as Seamus Riley
- William Forsythe as Randolph McCluskey
- Maika Monroe as Abigail Riley
- Rhys Wakefield as Marcus McCluskey
- Owen Teague as Samuel Riley
- Ryan O'Nan as Dillard McCluskey
- Beth Broderick as Doris McCluskey

== Production ==
Co-writers Kane Senes and John Chriss wrote the script in Sydney, Australia in 2012. The working title of the film was A Relative Stranger, based on Senes's graduate film of the same name. The pair then partnered with producers Dave Szamet, Steven J. Berger and Kyle Fischer. Casting began in Los Angeles in May 2013 and the film was shot in Austin, Texas in 25 days in September 2013.

According to Senes, the production almost came to a screeching halt when an investor pulled out two weeks before shooting began and the team started shooting with enough money to get through week one out of four. Another investor came on at the last minute to complete the funding.

Composer Hanan Townshend, a frequent collaborator of director Terrence Malick, scored the film.

== Release ==
The film had its world premiere at the Dallas International Film Festival on April 15, 2015, where it won a Special Jury Prize for Best Ensemble Cast. It had a limited theatrical release on May 15, 2015, via AMC Theatres.

The Texas Tech University International Film Series did a one-night only screening hosted by Texas Tech alumnus and co-writer/producer John Chriss.

== Reception ==
Echoes of War received mixed reviews from critics. As of June 2020, the film holds a 31% approval rating on Rotten Tomatoes, based on 13 reviews with an average rating of 4.17 out of 10. Neil Genzlinger of The New York Times called it "a gloomy, somewhat underwritten story of two families just after the Civil War, an exploration of the kind of disruption that lingers after fighting on the battlefield is over" but goes on to say "the actors, who include William Forsythe as the McCluskey patriarch, play it with dark vigor." Michael Rechtshaffen of the Los Angeles Times wrote "while all the naturalistic overtones might suggest faith-based Terrence Malick, those committed performances keep the film involving, however recognizably those echoes might resonate."

David Ferguson of Red Carpet Crash was effusive in his praise of the film, writing "It's almost unbelievable to accept that this is the first feature film from director Kane Senes and his co-writer John Chriss. There is so much going on here with multiple layers of conflict and personalities … plus the movie is beautifully shot with an air of artistic flair", adding that the film has "a terrific and complex story, stellar acting, and a talented director, this is one that serious film goers should seek out and embrace." Truth on Cinema went as far as to call it "a gritty, well-acted masterpiece...rife with stunning imagery and poignant metaphor", Eye For Film called it "a shot across the bows of macho western culture" and Australia's FilmInk Magazine wrote the film was "filled with terrific performances and driven by a poetic script" and "a superb debut by Senes, and promises great things to come."

Jennie Kermode of Eye For Film singled out the cinematography and production design: "Wes Cardino's cinematography blends the soft golden shades we associate with a homecoming with stark empty skies and long bleak fields. Many shots are framed by trees or rocks so that we constantly have the sense that danger may be approaching. The costuming and interiors speak of a longer spell of poverty."
