= Fighter kite =

Kite used in the sport of kite fighting

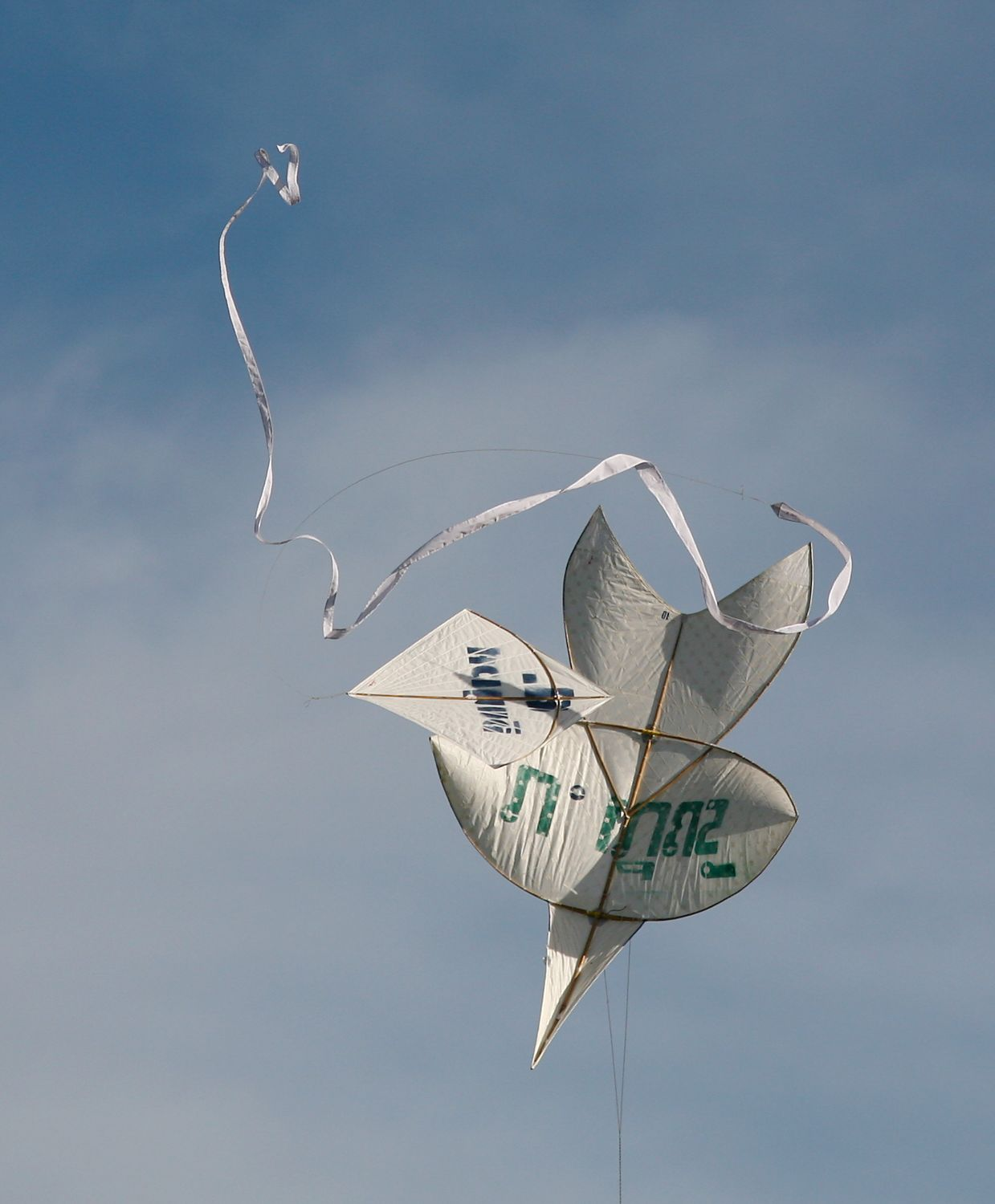
Duelling chula and pakpao kites, part of the Thai kite-fighting tradition

Fighter kites are kites used for the sport of kite fighting. Traditionally, most are small, unstable single-line flat kites, where line tension alone is used for control. A key element is the manja, typically glass-coated cotton strands, used to cut down the line of others.

Kite fighting is contested in many countries, but particularly in Afghanistan, Bangladesh, India, Indonesia, Hong Kong, Nepal, Pakistan, Vietnam, Korea, Thailand, Chile and Brazil.

== Materials ==
In most traditional fighter kite manufacture, the skins are made from a lightweight, thin paper and the spars are usually made from a lightweight and flexible wood, such as bamboo.

In modern American fighters, kite skins are made from a variety of synthetic materials, such as mylar, aircraft insulation (orcon or insulfab), nylon, and polyester sheeting. The spine may still be bamboo, but is often constructed of fiberglass or carbon fibre, as is the bow.

=== Line ===
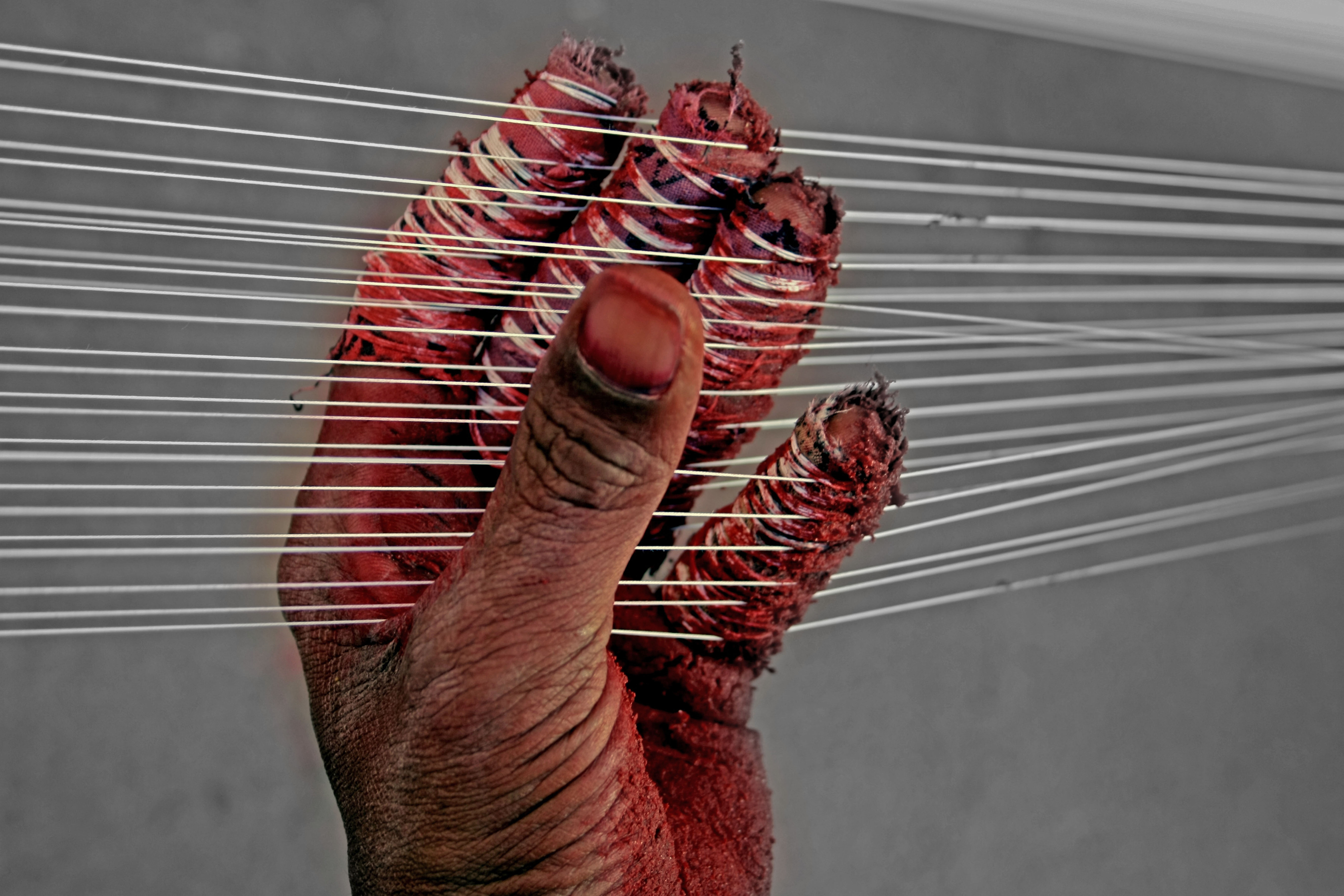
Lines being coated with crushed glass, by hand

The lines are treated in order to toughen them and allow them to cut other lines.

Historically, for most Asian-type fighters, a thin cotton or hemp line is coated with a mixture of finely crushed glass and rice glue. In recent years, synthetic line has used, and is coated with a variety of abrasives and stronger glue. There have been some reports of metallic line being used. Some cultures use a line that has metal knives or thin blades attached to the tail, line, or kite, in order to hook and cut the opponent's line. Depending on personal preference, other materials are added to improve the properties of the line.

Usually, there is a set length of manja at the kite end of the line. To avoid getting hand injuries, ordinary string (Urdu: سادہ/Punjabi: ਸੱਦੀ, sadda, lit. simple) is used for the ground end.

In line-touch competition, synthetic braided fishing line, 15 to 20 lb test, is used, due to its low stretch and high strength for the line diameter and weight. Waxed cotton, linen line, or Latex can also be used.

=== Key equipment names ===
- Americas
  - Spectra – A brand of fishing line used for American kite fighting.
  - Power Pro – A very thin [0.25 mm diameter] braided fishing line used for American kite fighting.
  - Spanish: Hilo de competencia (lit. competition line) and Hilo Curado (lit. cured line) – The cutting line used in Chile.
  - Portuguese: Cerol (lit. wax) – The cutting line/thread used in Brazil
- Afghanistan:
  - Tar (Dari: تار, lit. thread)– cutting line
- South Asia:
  - Manjha (Hindi: माँझा/Bengali: মাঞ্জা/Punjabi: ਮਾਂਝਾ/Urdu: مانجھا) – The cutting line of India, Bangladesh and Pakistan
    - Romanized as manjho in Rajasthan.
  - Dore (Punjabi: ਡੋਰ) – cutting line
  - Pench/paycha/paych (Punjabi: ਪੇਚਾ) – fighting to cut a kite down.
  - Kai po chhe (Gujarati: કાઈ પો ચે) – phrase proclaimed by the victor
- Elsewhere in Asia
  - Indonesian: Gelasan – The cutting line thread

== Bridle, tuning and flight ==
Bridle position, curve, centre of gravity, and balance of tension on the spars all play a role in how the kite spins and tracks. Afghan and Indian fighter kites and their variants have their bridles attached in two places on the kite's spine: at the crossing of the bow and the spine, and three-quarters to two-thirds of the total length of the spine from the nose of the kite. The length of the top line to the tow point is the length between the two bridle to spine connection points. The length of the bottom bridle to the tow point is between 1/2 and 2 inches (13 and 51 mm) longer than the length of the two spine connections. The spine of the kite has a slight convex curve toward the face of the kite. To make the kite spin more, the upper bridle line is shortened: to make the kite spin less, the lower bridle line is shortened.

Left and right tracking are adjusted by either placing weight on the tip of a wing or weakening the bow on the side that the flier wants the kite to track towards. The design of the kite plays a role in the kite's tendency to spin and pull, and how much wind the kite can handle. Bridling and tuning are only effective when the kite chosen is able to handle the amount of wind that it is being flown in. If the wind is so strong that the spine and bow are severely distorted, no amount of bridle tuning will help with making the kite controllable. A crude method of making a kite flyable in over-strong wind, used in India where the kites are cheap and regarded as disposable, is to burn small holes in the flying surface, typically using a cigarette.

When the kite is flown with the line taut, the kite is deformed by the wind pressure, giving it a degree of stability. When the line tension is reduced, either by letting out more line or by the flyer moving into wind, the kite will begin to become unstable and begin to rock from side to side, or in extreme cases even spin. By reapplying tension at the right moment, the kite will move in the direction that the flyer requires.

Although a spool that allows rapid winding and release of line is used, the flyer will often fly the kite by holding the line instead of the spool, with one or more assistants to help manage the slack line between the flyer and the spool.

== Kite fighting ==
Competition rules vary by region. Broadly speaking, two or more contestants fly their kites, and the person who cuts the opponent's line wins the fight. In multiple-kite matches, the person with the last kite in the air is the winner.

The two most common types of cutting are release cutting or pull cutting, both achieves with abrasive thread. To release cut, once lines are in contact, both parties reel out their lines until one is cut. In pull cutting, the flier quickly pulls in the line. Winning factors include the skill of the kite flyer, size of the kite, its speed, agility and durability, the quality of the line, its sharpness, the quality and size of the spool, the spool mechanism, initial contact and wind conditions.

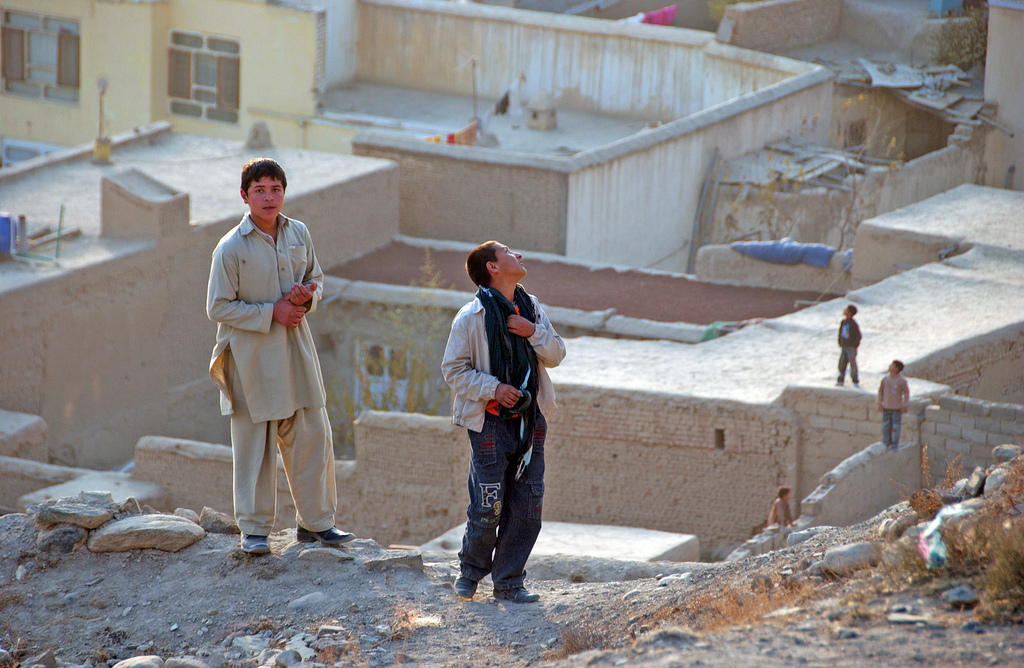
Kite runners on rooftops in Afghanistan

Competitors try to capture their opponents kite and bring it to the ground. Expert kite fighters are able to cut their opponent's line and then encircle the trailing line (lubjow) of the cut kite. Once secured, the winner can then fly both kites and pull in the prize. If the cut kite is not captured, then the kite belongs to no-one, and "kite runners" - typically younger children - will attempt to pursue and claim it.

Most contests are informal neighbourhood affairs. Organised competitions do exist, such as the "Red Bull Kite Fight", which has taken place each year since 2015, in a series of cities in North India.

== By country ==
Various countries where fighter kites are flown all have their own specific styles of kites, rules for fighting, and traditions. In many cases there is a "season" or a special occasion particularly associated with kite flying.

=== Afghanistan ===
Kites range from 0.5 to 1.5 m (1 ft 8 in to 4 ft 11 in) across. The usual name for the sport is gudiparan bazi (Dari: گودی‌پران بازی). As elsewhere, the line is traditionally made with a cotton line and coated with a mixture of crushed glass and rice glue. However, nylon string with stronger glue is now the more preferred line. Kites can fly up to 3,500 meters in height, depending on the size.

From 1996 to 2001, the first Taliban government of Afghanistan outlawed kite fighting and flying by declaring it "un-Islamic". After the Fall of the Taliban, kite fighting regained popularity in the country. Since the Taliban reestablished its second government over Afghanistan, it is not known if the pastime has been again outlawed.

=== Bangladesh ===
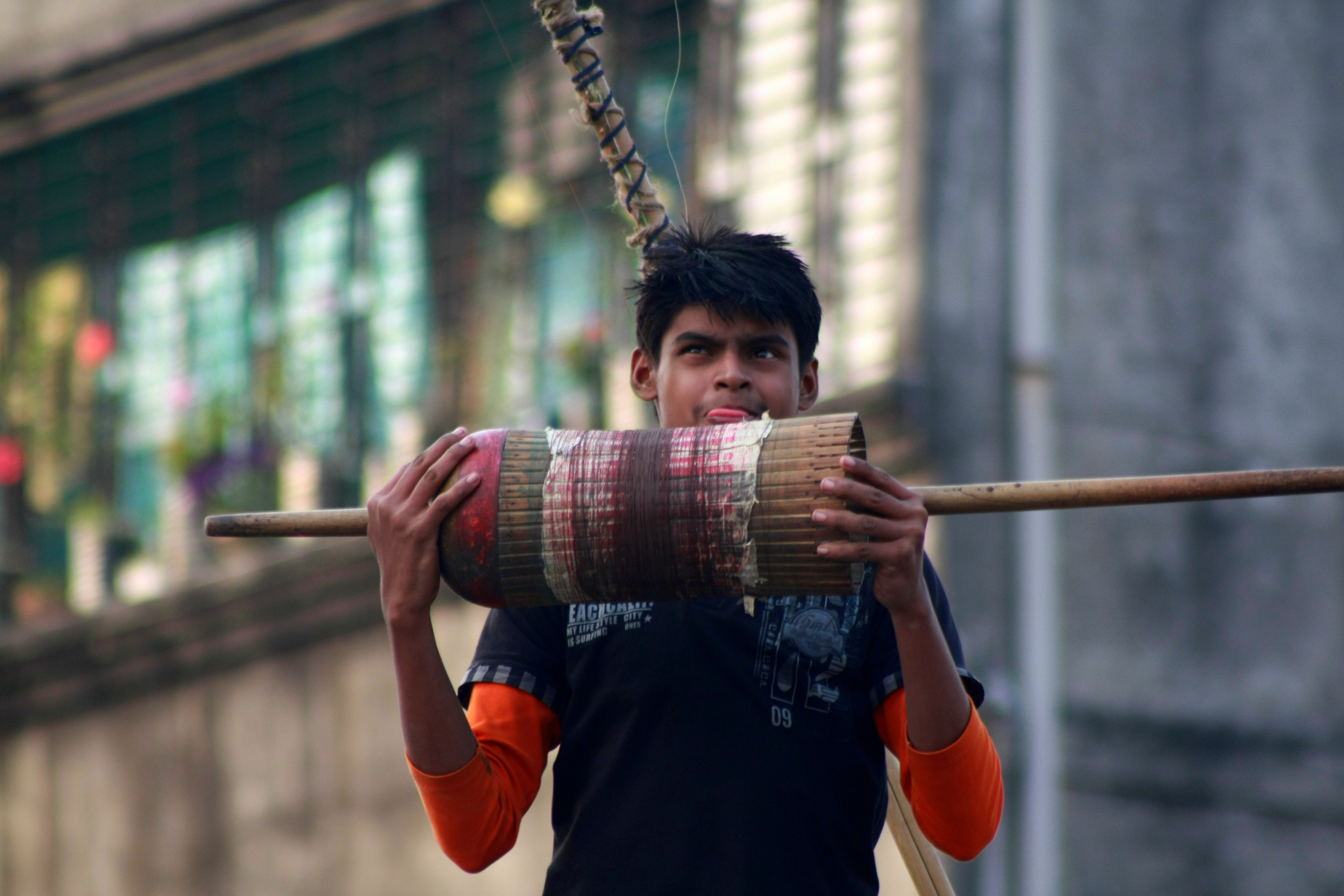
A kite fighter in Dhaka, Bangladesh

As part of the Shakrain festival, people, mostly from south Dhaka city, engage in kite fighting. They fly kites mostly from the rooftops. The festival is held in the last day of the Poush month.

=== Brazil ===
In Brazil, kite fighting is a very popular leisure activity for children, teenagers and even young adults, particularly boys and men. As in other countries with similar traditions, injuries are common and motorcyclists in particular need to take precautions. The traditional kite (pipa) has a pentagonal shape, but simple diamonds, similar to fighter kites elsewhere, are also very common.

=== Caribbean ===
Most Caribbean kites are hexagonal and flown with a tail. Instead of using a glass-coated line, sharp objects (generally razor blades) are attached to the tails in order to "drop" (Haitian Creole: koule) other kites.

Kite fighting has been recorded in Haiti, Cuba, Trinidad and Tobago, Curaçao and Suriname.

=== Chile ===
The usual Chilean kite is known as a volantín. They are roughly square, and made with light paper and bamboo sticks. Unlike other square fighter kites of the world, the Chilean volantín uses 3 support threads (two at the top and one at the bottom) for easier, more stable manoeuvre. Used for decoration or to highlight a celebratory motif such as the national flag, a trailing tail is left out for competitive matches. The Chilean volantín ranges from ñecla, the smallest size available, to pavo, the largest. However, for fighting, medio pavo (mid-size) are most popular, due to their more balanced performance in terms of speed, strength, and accuracy.

Chilean kite fighting includes the use of a large reel (carrete), for the manipulation and storage of the abrasive thread, and the use of wooden sticks for the manipulation of the carrete. Thus, a skilled kite fighter will likely complete a match without ever touching the thread with their hands, having mastered these rods. Since the mid-2000s, they have spread across Latin America and Europe. Their convenience, durability and safety results in equipment exports and tourism.

Practitioners of this activity usually begin fighting in September, when the spring winds buffet the coast. Clubs and professional associations prefer to host tournaments throughout the drier summer months, when the commercial kite season is over.

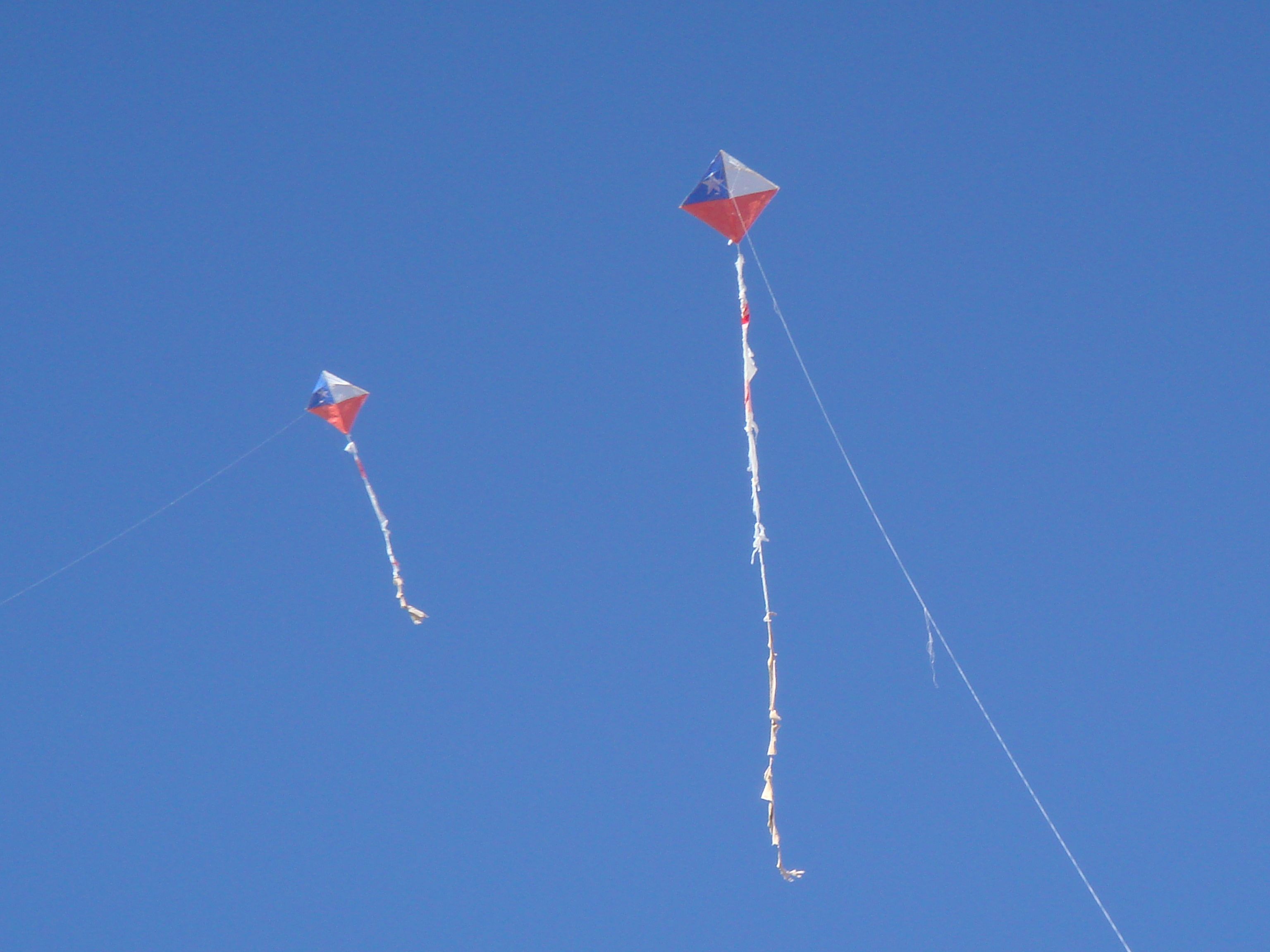
two volantines with Chilean flag

=== India ===
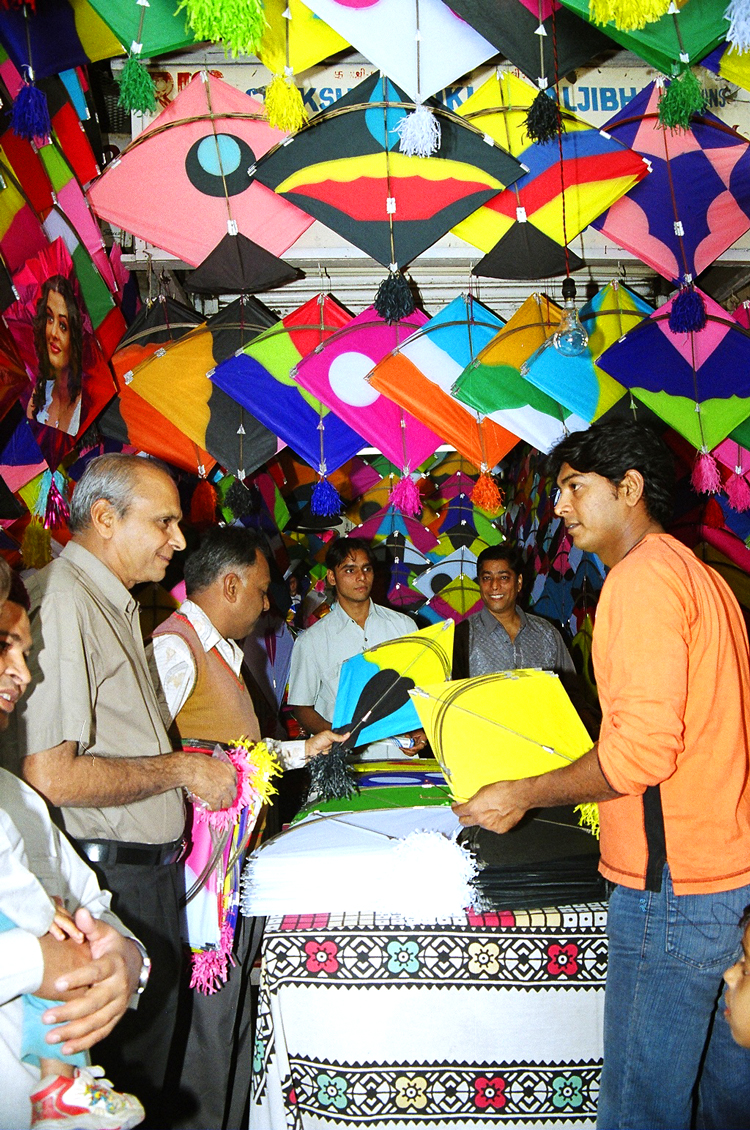
A kite shop in Lucknow, India

Fighter kites are known as patang (Hindi: पतंग) in India. Kite flying takes place mainly during specific festivals, particularly the spring festival known as Vasant Panchami, during Makar Sankranti and, more recently, on Indian Independence Day.

=== Japan ===
The Nagasaki hata (Japanese: 旗) is similar to the Indian patang, and it believed to have been introduced from Indonesia into Japan by Dutch traders. It is highly manoeuvrable and uses glass coated lines for line cutting contests.

A quite different type of kite fighting in Japan uses very large kites requiring teams. In these contests, cutting line is not used, but instead kites are forced down. The festivals occur at Shirone and Hamamatsu. The Rokkaku daku (六角凧), is a smaller, 1–2 m (3 ft 3 in – 6 ft 7 in) high hexagonal kite, also fought with teams of players flying each kite. Both the Rokkaku and the smaller, rectangular Buka have been adopted and further developed by western kite enthusiasts.

=== Korea ===
The bang-pae yeon (Korean: 방패연, lit. shield kite) is a rectangular, bowed "shield" kite with a hole in the middle of the sail. The frame uses five bamboo spars—one each across the top and the "waist" of the kite, a "spine," and two diagonals.

Although cutting line and fights are similar to other Asian fighter kites, a large spool is always used.

=== Nepal ===
Kite fighting in Nepal, called Changa Chait (Nepali: चङ्गा चेट), is especially popular around the festivals of Dashain and Tihar in September/October and October/November, respectively. The skies are filled with colourful kites called changa (चङ्गा), made from Nepali lokta paper (लोक्ता) and cutting lines coated in crushed glass. When a line is cut, the team with their kite still flying shouts "chet" (चेट) to signal victory over the opposing team.

=== Pakistan ===
Kite fighting is common all over Pakistan, but mainly concentrated in cities in the Punjab and Sindh regions, including Faisalabad, Gujranwala, Karachi and Islamabad. Lahore considered a major centre in South Asia. In the past, kite battling had was a sport in the city, with kite fliers termed Khilari (Urdu: کھلاڑی/Punjabi: ਖਿਡਾਰੀ).

Kites manufactured specifically for fighting are very different from conventional kites, as the former have features and capabilities made for competitions. The Mughal Emperor Akbar, who lived in Lahore from 1584 to 1598, enclosed the city in brick walls with twelve gates of considerable height and strength. Of these, the Moochi Darwaza ("Cobbler Gateway") is the most popular site in the city to buy and sell kite supplies and fireworks. Some fighting kite types include the Kup, Patang, Guda, Nakhlaoo, Pan, Tukal, Muchal, and Farfarata, all varying in balance, weight, and speed.

Kite flying is currently banned in some regions of Pakistan, as some coat their lines with glass or shards of metal, leading to injuries and deaths. Threads for fighting kite lines are made with special glues, chemicals, and crushed glass, then numbered based on ability to cut other lines and load-bearing capacity. Kite flying is often a social event in Pakistan, held once a year.

==== Bassant in Lahore ====
Lahore is famous for its Bassant or Spring Festival, with people from both Pakistan and India attending the two-day festival on the last weekend of February or in March. It begins on a Saturday night with battles of white-coloured kites, as people hold parties and play loud music on their rooftops until morning. Duels are punctuated with cries of "paich" (Urdu: پیچ/Punjabi: ਪੇਚਾ) signalling that the manja are entangled and cutting each other down, with fighters pulling and releasing, and victory cries of "wo kaataa" (Urdu: ووہ کاٹا). Wins are often celebrated with Punjabi-style Bhangra dancing to the beat of traditional drums.

=== United States ===
The Korean shield kite, the Japanese Rokkaku and Nagasaki Hata, the Brazilian piao, and Chilean fighter kites have been used for demonstration purposes at various large kite festivals throughout the country. Kite fighting styles and designs also differ by region and state. In the Pacific Northwest, enthusiasts prefer smaller, more maneuverable kites, popularized by names such as Bruce Lambert. The North American Kite Fighting Association (NAFKA) has held events in the states of Washington and Oregon. In Southern California, many different kites are flown, with the San Diego kite club having organised a New Year's Day kite fight for the past three decades. Many famous West Coast kite fighters, such as Victor Heredia, have attended such competitions and offered prizes for beating them. On the East Coast, many different kite fighting customs have come with immigrants, and fights are scheduled with many different kite clubs holding both traditional as well as "line-touch" fights. The vast majority of all kite fights in the western United States are one-on-one battles.

Kite fighters in the United States use a variety of innovative kites from a wide range of designs and materials for "line touch" and skills competitions. Fighter or "single line maneuverable" kites can be found flying throughout the country at many kite festivals. A championship competition occurs at the annual convention of the American Kitefliers Association.

== Problems ==
=== Accidents ===
In India, Pakistan, Brazil and Chile, accidents involving the abrasive coated cutting line have been reported since at least 2001. These accidents range in severity, from small cuts on the fighter's fingers to a few reported deaths from contact with the line while riding motorcycles. Both the traditional cotton, rice and glass line and modern nylon or synthetic line coated with metallic or chemical abrasive compounds can cause injuries. Other injuries have happened while focused on capturing a cut kite, or not paying attention to one's actions while watching battles. Other accidents have occurred due to the masses of people present during large kite festivals, for which kite fighting has taken the blame. Most of these accidents are preventable, when fighting is strictly controlled to a specific arena, proper safety gear is worn by the fighters, and events are well managed.

To prevent further injury, countries including Chile, Pakistan (in Punjab), India (several states) and Brazil (several locations) have implemented restrictions or bans on the use of cutting line. Restrictions include limits on materials used to make the line, restricting when and where kite flying events can take place, banning the sale of some types of lines, mandating protective gear on motorcycles when riding during kite festivals, and outright bans on kite flying.

== List of types ==
- Afghan Fighter Kite (Afghanistan)
- American Fighter Kite (United States and Canada)
- Benang Gelasan (Indonesia)
- Chula (Thailand)
- Do Akkhal (Pakistan)
- Do Pana (Pakistan)
- Farfarata (Pakistan)
- Gulair (Pakistan)
- Gum Pana (Pakistan)
- Hata (Japan)
- Indian Fighter Kite (also Patang) (India)
- Kashti (Pakistan)
- Kupp (Pakistan)
- Layangan Aduan (Indonesia)
- Layangan Palembang (Palembang, Indonesia)
- Lokta Changa (Nepal)
- Macchar (Pakistan)
- Pakistani Fighter Kite (also Patang) (Pakistan)
- Pakpao (Thailand)
- Pipas (Brazil)
- Piyala (Pakistan)
- Rokkaku (Japan)
- Salara (Pakistan)
- Shield Kite (Korea)
- Shistru (Pakistan)
- Suit (Pakistan)
- Teera (Pakistan)
- Tukkal (Pakistan and India)
- Volantines (Chile)

== See also ==
- Kite running, the practice of running after and catching kites drifting in the sky which have been cut loose in battle with other kites.
- Manja or Manjha, Hindi/Urdu for the abrasive coated fighting line as used in Pakistan and India.
- Basant Panchami, Spring festival of Hindus celebrated with kite-flying in India.
- Shakrain, Bengali kite festival
- Uttarayan, The kite flying festival of northern India.
- The novel The Kite Runner, and the movie based on it.
