= The Brooklyn Brothers Beat the Best =

American independent comedy film

- Film poster
- Directed by: Ryan O'Nan
- Written by: Ryan O'Nan
- Starring: Ryan O'Nan; Michael Weston; Arielle Kebbel; Andrew McCarthy; Jason Ritter
- Cinematography: Gavin Kelly
- Edited by: Annette Davey
- Music by: Rob Simonsen
- Production companies: Brooklyn Brothers 5 Character Brigade; Taggart Productions; TideRock Films
- Distributed by: Oscilloscope
- Release date: September 9, 2011 (Toronto International Film Festival)
- Running time: 98 minutes
- Country: United States
- Language: English

The Brooklyn Brothers Beat the Best is a 2011 American independent comedy film written and directed by Ryan O'Nan and starring Ryan O'Nan, Michael Weston and Arielle Kebbel. The story focuses on a failing musician named Alex, who joins an eccentric musician and a beautiful con artist on a tour across the United States. The film debuted at the Toronto International Film Festival in September 2011.

== Plot ==
The film opens with Alex (O'Nan), performing at a club with another artist. The performance goes badly, and Alex is kicked out of the partnership on account of his depressing lyrics. The next day, Alex arrives late at work much to the scrutiny of his boss and co-worker. He tries to leave early to go to a gig, although his boss refuses to let him go, and his co-worker taunts him about it. This prompts Alex to assault him and he is fired immediately afterwards.

Now out of work, Alex goes to his gig, which is at a school and involves him playing guitar for a group of mentally handicapped adults while dressed in a pink moose outfit. The gig goes well at first with the group getting up to dance while he plays, although one of them latter attacks him with a fake knife, prompting Alex to punch him. He is kicked out of the school, and wanders into a park where he meets a man named Jim (Weston) who recognizes him from the failed performance the night before.

After initially trying to chase him off, Jim knocks Alex unconscious and drags him back home where he proposes his idea of starting a band together, since he too was recently kicked out of a band. Alex, upset about being knocked out and abducted, chases Jim out of his apartment and later gets a call from his older brother Brian (Andrew McCarthy) Brian suggests that Alex stay at his place for a while to get his life back together, and Alex initially agrees, although later changes his mind and returns to Jim, agreeing to travel with him.

After borrowing Jim's Grandpa's car, the two begin writing music on the way to the first gig later that night, and arrive only to discover that Jim isn't technically booked at the club he wants to perform at. They meet with Cassidy (Kebbel), who works as a manager for the club and agrees to book them after taking an interest in Alex. That night, Alex and Jim perform together and are a huge success. They spend the night at Cassidy's place and in the morning, she insists on joining them on their tour.

Alex reluctantly brings her along, and she creates merchandise to sell during the shows. At the next gig, the band is greeted with star treatment and a top notch dressing room with complimentary wine and snacks. When Alex asks Jim how he managed to get a dressing room like that, Jim admits that he told the manager that Scott Weiland from the Stone Temple Pilots was fronting them.

Shortly before the gig, the manager confronts Jim about Weilands absence and Jim tells him that Weiland on a bender, and can't make the show. He convinces the manager that the story is true, and lies well enough to bring him to tears. The band doesn't get to perform but sells most of their merchandise and Cassidy steals a bottle of wine. After Jim falls asleep, Alex and Cassidy share the bottle and chat, although Alex becomes agitated when Cassidy reveals that she read the letter he writes to himself (the purpose of which is never fully explained).

The band continues its travels, eventually taking a gig in an unusual frat house. After the gig, Cassidy and Alex have sex, and Alex wakes up in the morning to discover that Cassidy has taken all their money and left. With little gas, Alex and Jim are unable to arrive at their next gig, and are stranded in a small town, unable to raise any money. Alex gives up and leaves, traveling to his brother's house.

Brian and his family, all born again Christians, are happy to accept Alex back home. He rooms with his nephew Jackson (Jake Miller), and teaches him a little of how to play guitar. The next day, Jackson expresses an interest in taking a music course, much to Brian's dismay. Alex tries to convince Brian to support Jackson's decision but Brian chastises Alex for being a bad influence on his son. Alex deciding he is no longer welcome, gets ready to leave and as he is saying his goodbye to Jackson, he sees Cassidy walking down the street towards him. Cassidy explains that she returned the money, and that Jim's grandfather has died. When Alex asks where Jim has gone, Cassidy tells him where the club is, and Alex asks Brian to drive him. Brian reluctantly agrees to do so and they arrive to see Jim being thrown out. He reconciles with Jim, and the two perform outside the club.

As they drive away to continue their tour, now with Cassidy rejoining them. Cassidy promises to repay Alex and Jim, and during the final moments of the film, passionately kisses Alex.

== Cast ==
- Ryan O'Nan as Alex
- Michael Weston as Jim
- Arielle Kebbel as Cassidy
- Andrew McCarthy as Brian
- Jason Ritter as Kyle
- Wilmer Valderrama as Jason
- Christopher McDonald as Jack
- Melissa Leo as Sarah
- Jake Miller as Jackson
- Charles Chu as Joe
- Philip Ettinger as John John
- Steven Boyer as Fibber
- Charlie Hewson as Tibber

== Release ==
The Brooklyn Brothers Beat the Best debuted in September 2011 at the Toronto International Film Festival, and was released in theatres in September 2012.

== Reception ==
On the review aggregator website Rotten Tomatoes, 33% of 21 critics' reviews are positive. Metacritic, which uses a weighted average, assigned the film a score of 54 out of 100, based on 11 critics, indicating "mixed or average" reviews.

On Time Out magazine, Cath Clarke rated it 2/5 stars writing that "it's sweet in places, but too similar to every other eccentric film about a going-nowhere artist hiding his inner brilliance under passive-aggressive annoyingness." Peter Bradshaw of The Guardian rated it 3/5 stars writing that "the comedy is at odds, perhaps even at war, with the gravitational downward pull of bittersweet seriousness, and the sucrose content is pretty high by the end. But it's an entertaining film."
