= The Unusuals =

- Genre: Comedy drama; Crime
- Created by: Noah Hawley
- Starring: Amber Tamblyn; Jeremy Renner; Harold Perrineau; Joshua Close; Monique Gabriela Curnen; Kai Lennox; Terry Kinney; Adam Goldberg
- Composer: Jeff Russo
- Country of origin: United States
- Original language: English
- No. of seasons: 1
- No. of episodes: 10

Production
- Executive producers: Noah Hawley; Robert De Laurentiis; Peter O'Fallon; Denis Leary; Jim Serpico; Peter Tolan
- Producers: Michael Stricks; Kate Garwood
- Running time: 44 minutes
- Production companies: Totally Commercial Films (pilot only); 26 Keys Productions; Sony Pictures Television

Original release
- Network: ABC
- Release: April 8 – June 17, 2009

The Unusuals is an American crime television series created by Noah Hawley for ABC. It follows the detectives in the New York City Police Department's fictional 2nd Precinct, many of whom have their secret eccentricities. The series ran for one season from April 8, 2009, to June 17, 2009.

== Premise ==
Casey Shraeger transfers from Vice to the New York City Police Department's 2nd Precinct to work at Sergeant Harvey Brown's station. Her new partner is Jason Walsh, whose previous partner was killed the same night Casey was assigned to him. Casey was chosen because Brown believes her to be incorruptible, since she comes from a wealthy family and chose to work for the police from a sense of doing good, instead of money. Casey recruits her new partner in search of Walsh's ex-partner's killer. He was known to be corrupt, but he finds the others at the 2nd Precinct, particularly Henry Cole who once lived by another name and robbed an armored car. Cole's partner, Allison Beaumont, is identified as Walsh's girlfriend. Besides Shraeger, Walsh, Beaumont and Cole, the station has three detectives: Leo Banks, who wears a bulletproof vest everywhere he goes, because he is afraid he will die, as his father, grandfather and uncle did; Banks' partner Eric Delahoy, who has a brain tumor with hallucination, but refuses to notify anyone, for fear that treatment could kill or cripple him; and Eddie Alvarez, who sees himself as a "lone wolf" and talks about himself in the third person. The series ending left the question of Delahoy's fate unresolved.

== Cast ==
=== Main ===
- Jeremy Renner as Detective Jason Walsh, an experienced and respected detective with a painful past partnered with Shraeger after his partner died.
- Amber Tamblyn as Detective Casey Shraeger, scion of a wealthy New York family hiding her background.
- Harold Perrineau as Detective Leo Banks, who has an extreme paranoia of death.
- Joshua Close as Detective Henry Cole, a young detective with dark history.
- Monique Gabriela Curnen as Detective Allison Beaumont, one of the few female detectives at 2nd Precinct.
- Kai Lennox as Detective Eddie Alvarez, the oddball of 2nd Precinct who speaks of himself in the third person and lacks social skills.
- Terry Kinney as Sergeant Harvey Brown, the commander of the 2nd Precinct.
- Adam Goldberg as Detective Eric Delahoy, Banks' witty partner.

=== Recurring ===
- Chris Sarandon as Walter Shraeger, Casey's wealthy father.
- Heather Burns as Bridget Demopolis, a dispatch operator in the 2nd Precinct whom Banks harbors romantic feelings for.
- Ryan O'Nan as Frank Lutz, Cole's former criminal accomplice.
- Kat Foster as Nicole Brandt, an attorney married to Alvarez and former high school classmate of Shraeger.
- Ian Kahn as Davis Nixon, Shraeger's financial manager who makes a relationship with her.
- Susan Park as Dr. Monica Crumb, the 2nd Precinct's medical examiner.
- Matthew Maher as Marvin Bechamel, a mentally-disabled criminal whom Walsh meet.
- Robyn Rikoon as Amy Burch, Cole's fiancée.
- Robert Funaro as Officer Leach, a 2nd Precinct police officer.
- Cristin Milioti as sketch artist, an unnamed member of the 2nd Precinct responsible for constructing facial composite.
- Marcella Lowery as Officer Shelia Trunk, a 2nd Precinct police officer.

== Episodes ==
No.	Title	Directed by	Written by	Original release date	Prod. code	Viewers (millions)
1	"Pilot"	Stephen Hopkins	Noah Hawley	April 8, 2009	101	6.8
Casey works in a vice until a fellow officer is killed. She goes to investigate the murder, and find out if he was crooked or not. She begins learning some interesting facts about her new co-workers.
2	"Boorland Day"	Constantine Makris	Noah Hawley	April 15, 2009	102	6
A family of criminals has the detectives running around the city until Walsh and Shraeger discover their motives and negotiate a stop to all the crime. Brown has Shraeger investigate Walsh's past because his former partner turned out to be a dirty cop. Meanwhile, Cole's former partner in crime returns, making it even more difficult for Cole to hide the past.
3	"One Man Band"	Jamie Babbit	Alexi Hawley	April 21, 2009	103	5.8
Banks and Delahoy run into trouble on an undercover sting, while Casey discovers that a personal favor throws a wrench into another case.
4	"Crime Slut"	Peter O'Fallon	Bob DeLaurentis	April 22, 2009	104	4.7
Beaumont tries to keep her financial woes a secret after being caught in the middle of a pawn shop robbery.
5	"42"	Matt Earl Beesley	Sarah Watson	April 29, 2009	105	4.9
Cole confronts the past when a fellow detective is shot, while Banks tries to defy fate by stopping a group of bus thieves.
6	"The Circle Line"	Constantine Makris	Gary Lennon	May 6, 2009	106	4.6
Walsh and Shraeger try to help fellow officer Lewis Powell (Corey Stoll), who believes he may have killed someone after he passed out during a night of drinking and woke up injured with his gun missing. The body of Ellen Richards (Chelsea Marino) is found in the hotel room Powell stayed in, but Walsh and Shraeger uncover that Powell is being framed by Richards' ex-boyfriend Earl Bentley (Ari Fliakos), who is arrested. Meanwhile, Banks and Delahoy learn they are both victims of identity theft when Banks' identity thief turns up dead. Delahoy confronts his identity thief, Bob Ryder (Eric T. Miller), but lets him go when he sees that Bob turned his life around. Delahoy's brain tumor causes him to hallucinate his high school girlfriend Karen Delmonte (Conor Leslie). He reveals his condition to Crumb and she agrees to treat him.
7	"The Tape Delay"	Rosemary Rodriguez	Treena Hancock & Melissa R. Byer	May 27, 2009	107	3.9
Casey and Walsh find a wealthy businessman they were assigned to protect, while Banks and Delahoy chase a male elder on a crime spree.
8	"The Dentist"	Matt Earl Beesley	Jorge Zamacona	June 3, 2009	108	2.9
Alvarez is left in charge of the squad and promptly loses a thief and the evidence money to a massive collar. Banks locks himself inside his apartment, but witness a murder outside.
9	"The Apology Line"	Constantine Makris	Noah Hawley	June 10, 2009	109	4.4
Shraeger and Walsh investigate a drug store owner's murder; Delahoy convinces the medical examiner to give him an MRI.
10	"The E.I.D."	Ed Bianchi	Danny Zuker	June 17, 2009	110	3.8
Beaumont and Cole pursue a criminal who breaks into an apartment and shoots male adult films, while Shraeger finds herself invested in trying to help a serial accuser.

== Reception ==
The series holds a 72% rating on Rotten Tomatoes.

== Home media ==
The series was released on DVD for Amazon on April 6, 2010. It can be found on Netflix (via DVD only, not streaming), Hulu, Amazon.com, and free of charge on Crackle, and Tubi.
