= Azita Ghanizada =

Afghan-born American actress (born 1978/1979)

- Born: 1978/1979 (age 47–48)
- Occupation: Actress
- Years active: 2004–present
- Organization: MENA Arts Advocacy Coalition

Azita Ghanizada (born 1978/1979) is an American television, film and stage actress. She is known for her work on several television series, including Alphas, United States of Al, Entourage, Suits LA and the Broadway musical The Kite Runner. In addition to her acting work, Ghanizada is also the founder and President of the MENA Arts Advocacy Coalition.

== Life and career ==
Ghanizada's life in America began as a political asylum seeker. The relationships her father made, while working at the U.S. Embassy in Tehran, Iran, afforded her family the opportunity to flee Afghanistan when she was a baby. She learned most of her English from watching American television in the Virginia suburbs of Washington, D.C. This, combined with the family's regular trips to a local cinema that showed Bollywood movies, and her mother's love of Indian and American film stars, inspired Ghanizada to become an actress. She relocated to Los Angeles, California and began her on-camera career by working in television commercials and guest starring on popular television shows. A few of her notable television guest-starring roles include How I Met Your Mother, Entourage, Veronica Mars, The Mentalist, Psych, Ghost Whisperer, Castle, and Up All Night.

Her first main role on television was in 2008, when Ghanizada joined the cast of the General Hospital prime-time spin-off General Hospital: Night Shift for season 2 as Dr. Saira Batra, a specialist in holistic medicine. The following year, she joined the all-star cast of the television pilot Tough Trade starring opposite Sam Shepard and Cary Elwes, from Weeds creator Jenji Kohan, and executive producer T Bone Burnett. In 2010, she joined David Strathairn as a primary cast member of the American Syfy Channel series Alphas where she played Rachel Pirzad, a woman with enhanced sensory abilities. Alphas was picked up to series in 2011 but only lasted two seasons. She went on to film the comedy pilot Ellen More or Less in 2014 as a primary cast member for NBC directed by Peyton Reed, the television pilot was not picked up to series.

In 2016, Ghanizada appeared in the feature Complete Unknown, opposite Rachel Weisz and Michael Shannon. Her performance led to her being named "One of The 7 Sundance Break-out Actresses You Need to Know". In 2017, she began production on Kevin Smith's feature film KillRoy Was Here. In 2019, she began recurring roles on both Ballers and Good Trouble.

In 2022, she made her Broadway debut in the co-lead role of Soraya, in the stage adaptation of The Kite Runner. In 2024, it was announced that she was joining Suits LA as Roslyn Noori In 2026 she joined the Bosch prequel, Start of Watch, as Stacy Brandt.

Ghanizada is also a notable advocate for both Middle Eastern North African (MENA) and South West Asian North African (SWANA) performers in Hollywood, and women in Afghanistan. In 2016, she founded the MENA Arts Advocacy Coalition, MAAC, and in 2017, she succeeded in lobbying the Screen Actors Guild–American Federation of Television and Radio Artists (SAG-AFTRA) with other performers to include MENA as its own diverse category in theatrical contracts. This success marked the first new hiring category in a labor contract in 37 years. She also works as a global Ambassador for Women for Women International, focusing on getting women in Afghanistan back to work and educated.

== Filmography ==
Film
Year	Title	Role	Notes
2004	A Kiss on the Nose	Chiara	Short film
2007	X's & O's	Anita	
2010	You, Only Better...	Kali Parker	
2011	Blood Shot	Zahra	
2016	Complete Unknown	Ramina	
2020	Our Friend	Elizabeth	
2021	We Broke Up	Roya	
2022	KillRoy Was Here	Sarah	
2025	Vortex	Shirin B	

Television
Year	Title	Role	Notes
2005	The Closer	Neighbor	Episode: "Batter Up"
2006	Numbers	Prita	Episode: "Harvest"
2007	Bones	Girlfriend	Episode: "The Man in the Mansion"
2007	The Wedding Bells	Jody	Episode: "Wedding from Hell"
2007	Veronica Mars	Amira Krimani	Episode: "Un-American Graffiti"
2008	General Hospital: Night Shift	Dr. Saira Batra	Main cast (season 2)
2009	How I Met Your Mother	Sexy Female Cop	Episode: "As Fast as She Can"
2009	Entourage	Kelly	Episode: "Amongst Friends"
2009	Psych	Mina	Episode: "Bollywood Homicide"
2009	Ghost Whisperer	Charee	Episode: "Devil's Bargain"
2010	Tough Trade	Sabina	TV movie
2010	Castle	Mistress Sapphire	Episode: "The Mistress Always Spanks Twice"
2010	NCIS: Los Angeles	Rochelle Stanton	Episode: "Disorder"
2011	Friends with Benefits	Tasi	Episode: "The Benefit of Full Disclosure"
2011–2012	Alphas	Rachel Pirzad	Main cast
2012	Body of Proof	Annabelle Kip	Episode: "Cold Blooded"
2012	Up All Night	Natasha	Episode: "The Game of Life"
2013	The Mentalist	Defiance	Episode: "Green Thumb"
2014	Major Crimes	Angela Soames	Episode: "Frozen Assets"
2014	Ellen More or Less	Lucy	Unsold pilot
2016	I Love Dick	Sahar	Episode: "Cowboys and Nomads"
2017	Wisdom of the Crowd	Tanya	Episode: "User Bias"
2018	9-1-1	Kelly Wesson	Episode: "Let Go"
2018	Elementary	Dr. Sepi Chamanara	Episode: "The Worms Crawl In, The Worms Crawl Out"
2019	Ballers	Saphia Mena	2 Episodes
2019–2020	Good Trouble	Kendra Zahir	Recurring role (season 2)
2020	Magnum P.I.	Maxine Gilbert	Episode: "May The Best One Win"
2021–2022	United States of Al	Ariana	Guest episode (season 1), recurring role (season 2)
2023	Quantum Leap	Layla Adel	Episode: "Nomads"
2024	Station 19	Ms. Reed	Episode: "Give It All"
2025	Suits LA	Rosalyn	Recurring role
