= A Kiss on the Nose =

2004 American short film

- Directed by: Laura Neri
- Written by: Laura Neri
- Produced by: Brett Henenberg; Laura Neri; Linda Pianigiani; Ramjasha Rhodes
- Starring: Azita Ghanizada; Gianfranco Russo
- Cinematography: Gavin Kelly
- Edited by: Evelin Longo
- Music by: Aldo Shllaku
- Distributed by: University of Southern California
- Release date: August 15, 2004
- Country: United States
- Language: English

A Kiss on the Nose is an American short film that premiered in the United States at the Rhode Island International Film Festival on August 15, 2004. Written and directed by Laura Neri, the film stars Azita Ghanizada and Gianfranco Russo.

The film was developed as a project for the USC School of Cinematic Arts.

== Plot ==
Chiara looks back on her relationship with her distant father, Romano, after his death. To process her feelings about him and gain a deeper understanding of who he was, Chiara retraces Romano's history from his birth to his first encounter with her mother.

== Cast ==
- Azita Ghanizada as Chiara
- Gianfranco Russo as Romano
- Elena Fabri as Ilaria
- Monica Cortes as 10 year old Chiara
- Warren Sweeney as Notary
- Pat Lach as Italian Grandmother
- Svilena Kidess as Penelope
- Holly M. Martin as Nurse
- Maeva Cifuentes as 13 year old Chiara
- Judiann Barnes as Greek Mother
- Norman Hollyn as Greek Father
- Amalia Giannikou as Greek Sister
- Troy Lillestol as Greek Brother
