= Let's Give the Boy a Hand =

- Dexter episode
- Dexter (Michael C. Hall), Debra (Jennifer Carpenter) and Tom Matthews (Geoff Pierson) after finding Tony Tucci (Brad William Henke) alive.
- Episode no.: Season 1 Episode 4
- Directed by: Robert Lieberman
- Written by: Drew Z. Greenberg
- Production code: 104
- Original air date: October 22, 2006

Guest appearances
- Geoff Pierson as Tom Matthews; Rudolf Martin as Carlos Guerrero; Gina Hecht as Mrs. Tucci; Brad William Henke as Tony Tucci; Scott William Winters as Det. McNamara; Dominic Janes as Young Dexter Morgan; Erin Daniels as Rita's neighbor; Monique Gabriela Curnen as Yelina; Angela Alvarado Rosa as Nina Batista; Christina Robinson as Astor Bennett; Daniel Goldman as Cody Bennett; Laura Marano as Young Debra Morgan; Devon Graye as Teenage Dexter Morgan; Haley King as Teenage Debra Morgan; Kathrin Middleton as Doris Morgan

Episode chronology
← Previous "Popping Cherry"	Next → "Love American Style"
- Dexter (season 1)

"Let's Give the Boy a Hand" is the fourth episode of the first season of the American television drama series Dexter. It premiered on October 22, 2006, on Showtime in the United States. The episode was written by Drew Z. Greenberg and directed by Robert Lieberman. The Ice Truck Killer starts leaving body parts of his latest victim at locations related to Dexter's childhood, making him confront his dark personal history. Meanwhile, Rita confronts a neighbor with a noisy dog that is keeping her children up at night. Lieutenant LaGuerta seeks to comfort the mother of the latest Ice Truck Killer victim and the pressure on Sergeant Doakes escalates when Guerrero's associates begin following him.

== Plot ==
Whilst investigating a severed hand found on a beach, Doakes spots Guerrero's men watching him. After discovering the hand belongs to Tony Tucci, LaGuerta visits his mother in an attempt to make amends for naming him as the Ice Truck Killer on television. Dexter remembers that he and Harry visited this beach when he was a child, where Harry lectured him on the importance of faking emotions to make other people happy. Back at his apartment, Dexter looks through a family photo album. It appears that the Ice Truck Killer broke into his apartment to get to know him, not just leave doll parts.

LaGuerta forces Debra to watch boxes of surveillance tapes. Kara's brother continues to taunt Doakes about how he's going to get himself killed. Doakes lets him know that Ricky wouldn't come out of cover to give Kara a divorce, suggesting he's the reason she was killed. Later, a severed foot is found near an old soccer field where Dexter played in his youth. Dexter tells Doakes that the killer is sending a message that is more important than the ritual but cannot tell him what or why. After analysis of the foot, Dexter determines that Tucci is still alive and is systematically having his limbs removed by the Ice Truck Killer. LaGuerta phones Tony's mother to tell her that her son might still be alive.

Batista repeatedly asks Dexter for his advice on an anniversary gift for his wife. It transpires, however, that they have been separated for three months due to "something he did." Batista ultimately gives her a necklace. Meanwhile, Rita and her children are being kept awake at night by a neighbor's dog. When both Rita and Dexter are met with derision from the dog's owner, Rita takes the neglected dog and drives it to a friend's house to live with her and her daughters. She then goes to Dexter's apartment and performs oral sex on him, before inadvertently giving him insight on the pattern the Ice Truck Killer is pursuing – leaving body parts at locations in which Dexter was previously photographed with his father.

Doakes is kidnapped from his home by Guerrero's men. As Guerrero moves in to finish Doakes off, the police arrive and arrest Guerrero and his men, having used Doakes as bait. Meanwhile, Dexter follows the clues to an abandoned hospital and finds a blindfolded Tucci strapped to a gurney. Tucci begs for death, but Dexter cannot bring himself to kill Tucci, his code forbidding him from killing innocent people. He makes an anonymous tip to Debra and leaves.

== Production ==
"Let's Give the Boy a Hand" was written by Drew Z. Greenberg and directed by Robert Lieberman. Drew Greenberg was nominated for a Writers Guild of America Award for the Best Dramatic Series for his work on Dexter in February 2008. Filming took place on the beach of Fort Lauderdale, Florida at the north tip of South Beach Park. and in various places across Miami and Los Angeles.

== Reception ==
Eric Goldman of IGN gave the episode 9.0/10 and said of it that: "This was a very strong episode overall, that contained a lot of clever, dark comedy." He also praised the main plot: "The personal touches the killer was doing just for Dexter were a very intriguing aspect of this episode, and gave a natural narrative "in" to the flashbacks we saw of Dexter's childhood this week, as he recalled what was occurring when each photo was taken."

Sarah Dobbs of Den of Geek remarked that "there's some nice characterization here". She also praises the sub-plot involving Angel, "It's nice because it's all so cleverly handled."
