= Manja (string) =

Abrasive string used in kite fighting

Manja (or manjha) (IPA: /maːŋdʒʱaː/) is an abrasive string used to fly fighter kites, mainly in South Asian countries. It is made when a cotton string is coated with powdered glass or a similar abrasive. In Chile it is called hilo curado (cured thread).

== Composition ==
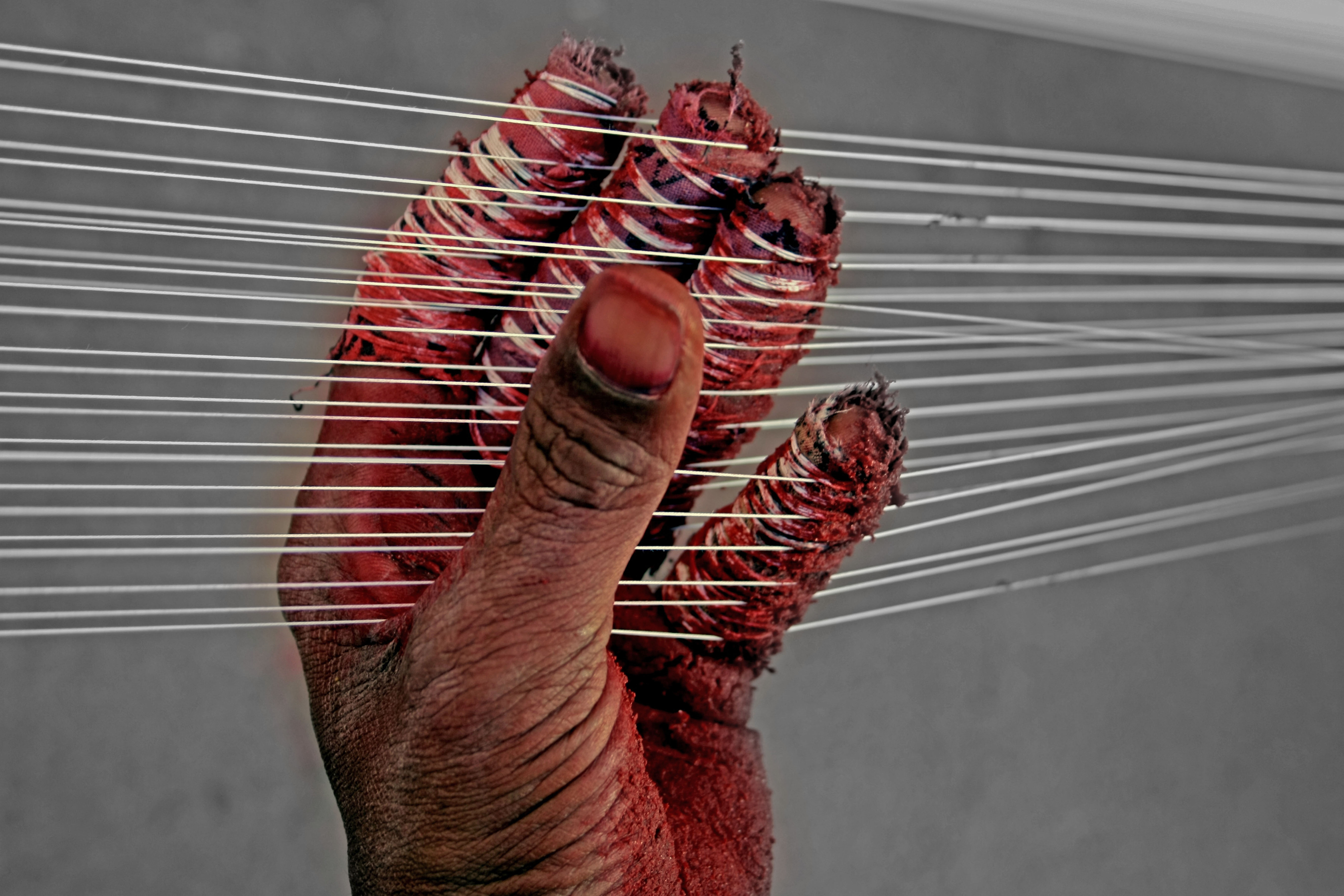
Manja strings

Traditionally, it is made on fine pure cotton thread coated with a mixture of rice glue, tree gums or similar natural ingredients and finely powdered glass, aluminum oxide or zirconia alumina for the abrasive.

A relatively recent introduction, China manja, is based on non biodegradable synthetic fibers.

== Safety ==
=== Rooftop falling ===
People often fly the kites from rooftops, which poses risks to their safety.

=== Kite runners ===
In some places, kite runners pursue kites to retrieve them without paying attention to the surrounding, causing accidents.

=== Bystanders injury ===
Many reports of motorcyclists and others having their throats cut by manja - especially when driving through hanging strings.

=== Threat to birds ===
It is also responsible for injuries to birds. A pair of volunteer bird medics in New Delhi care for about 1,000 black kites each year, 90% of which are injured by manja and half of which die.

At the Uttarayan festival, veterinarians had to repeatedly respond to situations where birds had been injured.

== Ban ==
=== India ===
Several attempts were initiated by government and authorities but none seem to be successful.

=== Pakistan ===
It was banned in Lahore since 2006.
