= Brotherhood (Person of Interest) =

- Person of Interest episode
- Episode no.: Season 4 Episode 4
- Directed by: Chris Fisher
- Written by: Denise Thé
- Cinematography by: Gonzalo Amat
- Editing by: Mark Conte
- Production code: 3J5404
- Original air date: October 14, 2014
- Running time: 43 minutes

Guest appearances
- Enrico Colantoni as Carl Elias; Jamie Hector as Lincoln "Link" Cordell; Amir Mitchell-Townes as Malcolm Booker; Rosie Benton as Agent Erica Lennox; Winston Duke as Mini; Tobias Truvillion as Trig

Episode chronology
← Previous "Wingman"	Next → "Prophets"

"Brotherhood" is the 4th episode of the fourth season of the American television drama series Person of Interest. It is the 72nd overall episode of the series and is written by co-executive producer Denise Thé and directed by co-executive producer Chris Fisher. It aired on CBS in the United States and on CTV in Canada on October 14, 2014.

The series revolves around a computer program for the federal government known as "The Machine" that is capable of collating all sources of information to predict terrorist acts and to identify people planning them. A team, consisting of John Reese, Harold Finch and Sameen Shaw follow "irrelevant" crimes: lesser level of priority for the government. However, their security and safety is put in danger following the activation of a new program named Samaritan. In the episode, the team must protect two kids who stole drug money from The Brotherhood and The Brotherhood will try to reach up to them. Despite being credited, Amy Acker does not appear in the episode.

According to Nielsen Media Research, the episode was seen by an estimated 9.72 million household viewers and gained a 1.5/5 ratings share among adults aged 18–49. The episode received positive reviews, with critics praising the twists and development for The Brotherhood although its pace received more criticism.

== Plot ==
The Machine produces two numbers: Tracie Booker and her brother Malcolm. Failing to get any vital information, Reese (Jim Caviezel) investigates a gang shootout in a building after a drug deal gone wrong. Drug Enforcement Administration Agent Erica Lennox (Rosie Benton) informs him that the deal was between The Brotherhood and an Armenian gang but the money is missing although they have a survivor only known as Mini (Winston Duke).

Finch (Michael Emerson) finds Malcolm and Tracie using the drug money but they realize they are being followed and use the crowd as a distraction to escape. Finch then finds Elias (Enrico Colantoni) in the subway train and Elias offers to take care of the Armenians but leave The Brotherhood to Finch and his team. Reese discovers that Link (Jamie Hector) will be released after The Brotherhood make another person take the blame and Lennox shares her idea that The Brotherhood has a mole in the DEA, working for the mysterious leader named Dominic. They find Malcolm and Tracie at a parking garage after being nearly killed by The Brotherhood. Shaw (Sarah Shahi) takes Mini out of an ambulance and forces him to reveal locations.

Reese and Lennox take Malcolm and Tracie to a safe house but Malcolm refuses to reveal the location of the real money. He reveals that he used the money to meet with lawyers and bail their mother out of prison. Reese manages to convince Malcolm to reveal the location of the money. Lennox leaves to find it while Reese stays with the kids. He receives a call from Fusco (Kevin Chapman), who found a phone number from a Brotherhood member that may lead to Dominic. Fusco calls and Lennox's phone (which she left to Tracie) rings, revealing she is the mole. Members of The Brotherhood start surrounding the safe house.

Fusco arrives and helps Reese in subduing The Brotherhood but Malcolm escapes and offers to exchange himself for his sister's safety. Reese then intervenes and offers the money and himself to let the kids go. When The Brotherhood finds that Reese doesn't have the money, Reese receives a call from Shaw, who found the heroin stash in a laundromat and threatens Link to let him and the kids go or she will burn the heroin. Malcolm and Tracie return to school and Reese puts Malcolm in contact with a lawyer to help their mother. Finch meets with Elias again to warn (not directly) him about Samaritan and gives him the address of The Brotherhood's laundromat.

Link picks up Mini where it's revealed that Mini knows that Shaw put a GPS tracker and led her to small amount of the money and that Mini is in fact Dominic, the boss of The Brotherhood. Lennox, who has been taken and put in the backseat, tries to explain her actions but Dominic kills her. He then tells Link to release the kids' mother as part of a campaign to induce gratitude. They then dump Lennox's corpse in the street and leave the scene.

== Reception ==
=== Viewers ===
In its original American broadcast, "Brotherhood" was seen by an estimated 9.72 million household viewers and gained a 1.5/5 ratings share among adults aged 18–49, according to Nielsen Media Research. This means that 1.5 percent of all households with televisions watched the episode, while 5 percent of all households watching television at that time watched it. This was a slight increase in viewership from the previous episode, which was watched by 9.64 million viewers with a 1.6/5 in the 18-49 demographics. With these ratings, Person of Interest was the third most watched show on CBS for the night, behind NCIS: New Orleans and NCIS, second on its timeslot and ninth for the night in the 18-49 demographics, behind Agents of S.H.I.E.L.D., The Flash, About a Boy, Chicago Fire, NCIS: New Orleans, Marry Me, NCIS, and The Voice.

With Live +7 DVR factored in, the episode was watched by 13.60 million viewers with a 2.5 in the 18-49 demographics.

=== Critical reviews ===
"Brotherhood" received positive reviews from critics. Matt Fowler of IGN gave the episode a "great" 8.5 out of 10 rating and wrote in his verdict, "'Brotherhood' may have felt weird in a few parts (knowing Lennox was the mole for a while, wondering why so much time was spent with Mini), but I usually can count on this show to bring everything together in a cool way by the end. Like it did here. Actually, in that respect most POI episodes usually don't start making me sit up until about halfway through after everything gets upended. And a really great episode is one that's able to turn the tables more than once."

Alexa Planje of The A.V. Club gave the episode a "B+" grade and wrote, "'Brotherhood' is an interesting episode in that it highlights Person of Interest's strengths and weaknesses. Like the series' best episodes, this one explores its favorite themes, such as corruption, trust, purpose, and the complex relationship between good and evil."

Sean McKenna of TV Fanatic gave the episode a 3.5 star rating out of 5 and wrote "Overall, this was just an OK hour of Person of Interest. While it had its moments, it wasn't something that blew me away. But not every episode is going to do that, and if anything, it really got me thinking about what else might be around the corner for Reese and company."
