= Chu and Blossom =

- Directed by: Charles Chu; Gavin Kelly
- Written by: Charles Chu; Ryan O'Nan
- Produced by: Jason Michael Berman; Caroline Connor; Thomas B. Fore; Ryan O'Nan
- Starring: Charles Chu; Ryan O'Nan; Caitlin Stasey; Alan Cumming; Richard Kind; Melanie Lynskey; Chris Marquette; Annie Potts; Mercedes Ruehl
- Cinematography: Jez Theirry
- Edited by: John Wesley Whitton; Robert Brakey
- Music by: Rob Simonsen
- Production companies: TideRock Media; Character Brigade; Films 5 Productions; Soaring Flight Productions; Baked Industries
- Release date: March 23, 2014 (Gasparilla)
- Running time: 104 minutes
- Country: United States
- Language: English

Chu and Blossom is a 2014 American comedy-drama film directed by Charles Chu and Gavin Kelly and starring Chu, Ryan O'Nan, Caitlin Stasey, Alan Cumming, Richard Kind, Melanie Lynskey, Chris Marquette, Annie Potts and Mercedes Ruehl.

== Cast ==
- Charles Chu as Joon Chu
- Ryan O'Nan as Butch Blossom
- Caitlin Stasey as Cherry Swade
- Alan Cumming as Uncle Jackie
- Richard Kind as Fred
- Melanie Lynskey as Miss Shoemaker
- Chris Marquette as Steve
- Annie Potts as Aunt Harley
- Mercedes Ruehl as Mrs. Fefterg

== Production ==
The film was shot in Tampa Bay, Plant City, Florida, Lakeland, Florida, Marion County, Florida and Ocala, Florida.

== Release ==
The film premiered at the Gasparilla International Film Festival on March 23, 2014.

== Reception ==
Justin Lowe of The Hollywood Reporter gave the film a negative review and wrote, "A big-name supporting cast isn’t enough to rescue this struggling comedy."
