= Ryan O'Nan =

American actor (born 1982)

- Born: March 25, 1982 (age 44); Truckee, California, United States
- Occupations: Actor; Writer; Director; Producer
- Years active: 2009–present
- Notable work: Queen of the South

Ryan O'Nan (born March 25, 1982) is an American actor, writer, and director, best known for his role as King George in Queen of the South.

== Career ==
In 2009, O'Nan had a recurring role on the crime drama series The Unusuals. In 2010, he starred in the drama film The Dry Land. He also had a role as Jared Hale in the pilot episode of the FX series, Justified. In 2011, he wrote, directed, and starred in the comedy film The Brooklyn Brothers Beat the Best. In 2012, he appeared in the crime film The Iceman and the comedy film Watching TV with the Red Chinese. In 2013, he starred in two thriller films, Altered Minds and The Frozen Ground.

In 2014, he starred as the titular role in The Blacklist episode "The Alchemist", before appearing in several episodes of Ray Donovan. In 2015, he was cast in the western film Echoes of War, starred in the action film Vice, and appeared in the horror film Anguish. In 2017, he gained notability when he starred as King George in the second season onward of Queen of the South, going on to co-producing the third season. In 2018, he was cast in Kevin Smith's horror comedy film KillRoy Was Here. In October 2020, he joined the cast of the 2021 film Copshop.

== Filmography ==
=== Film ===
Year	Title	Role	Notes
2010	The Dry Land	James	
2011	The Brooklyn Brothers Beat the Best	Alex	Also writer and director
2012	The Iceman	Terry Franzo	
2012	Watching TV with the Red Chinese	Dexter Mitchell	
2013	Altered Minds	Tommy Shellner	
2013	The Frozen Ground	Gregg Baker	
2014	Chu and Blossom	Butch Blossom	Also writer and producer
2015	Vice	Officer Matthews	
2015	Echoes of War	Dillard McCluskey	
2015	Anguish	Father Meyers	
2018	Belong to Us	Travis	
2021	Copshop	Huber	
2022	KillRoy Was Here	Tom	

=== Television ===
Year	Title	Role	Notes
2009	The Unusuals	Frank Lutz	5 episodes
2010	Law & Order: Criminal Intent	Dale Grisco	1 episodes
2014	The Blacklist	The Alchemist	Episode: "The Alchemist"
2014	Ray Donovan	Stan	6 episodes
2014	Person of Interest	Andre Cooper	Episode: "Wingman"
2015	Fargo	Ricky G	3 episodes
2016	The Last Tycoon	Dex Davis	1 episode
2017–2021	Queen of the South	King George	21 episodes Writer and co-producer
2021	Swimming With Sharks	Detective Floriani	3 episodes
2021–2022	Big Sky	Donno	Recurring (Seasons 2–3), writer and supervising producer
2023	Lawmen: Bass Reeves	Darrell Dolliver	3 episodes
2025	Law & Order	Jim Pickett	Episode: "Guardian"
