= Atossa Leoni =

German actress (born 1977)

Atossa Leoni (born October 1977) is a German-born film actress.

== Early and personal life ==
Leoni's mother is of Iranian descent, and her father was born in Afghanistan and raised in Germany by his adoptive mother. Atossa was born in Berlin, Germany, has lived in Rome, Italy, and received her education in the United States. She is fluent in five languages and currently resides in New York City.

== Career ==
Leoni appeared in the 2001 film America So Beautiful, which also starred Academy Award nominee Shohreh Aghdashloo. The film follows a group of immigrants in Los Angeles during the unfolding of the 1979 Iran hostage crisis. America So Beautiful was recognized at the Marrakech International Film Festival in 2002 and competed in the Panorama Section of the 2002 Berlin Film Festival.

Leoni made her American screen debut starring as Soraya, the female lead in the film adaptation of Khaled Hosseini's 2003 novel The Kite Runner.

Leoni narrated the audiobook versions of Khaled Hosseini's A Thousand Splendid Suns and Greg Mortenson's Three Cups of Tea, as well as his follow-up Stones into Schools.

In 2020, Leoni hosted the TED podcast TEDx SHORTS.

== Filmography ==
- America So Beautiful (2001)
- The Florist (2007; directed by Ladan Yalzadeh)
- The Kite Runner (2007)
