= KillRoy Was Here =

Horror comedy anthology film directed by Kevin Smith

- Official teaser poster
- Directed by: Kevin Smith
- Written by: Kevin Smith; Andrew McElfresh
- Produced by: Nick Morgulis
- Starring: Azita Ghanizada; Ryan O'Nan; Harley Quinn Smith; Chris Jericho; Justin Kucsulain; Jason Mewes; Ralph Garman
- Cinematography: Brandon D. Hyde
- Edited by: Brian Chamberlain
- Music by: Simon Taufique
- Production companies: SModcast Pictures; Semkor Productions; View Askew Productions
- Distributed by: Legendao
- Release date: July 12, 2022
- Running time: 63 minutes
- Country: United States
- Language: English
- Budget: $1 million (Estimated)

KillRoy Was Here is a 2022 American comedy horror anthology film directed by Kevin Smith, who co-wrote it with Andrew McElfresh. The film stars Azita Ghanizada, Ryan O'Nan, Harley Quinn Smith, Chris Jericho, Justin Kucsulain, Jason Mewes, and Ralph Garman.

Principal photography began in June 2017 and ended in October 2018, occurring in Sarasota and Longboat Key, Florida.

KillRoy Was Here was released as 5,555 exclusive, non-fungible tokens (NFTs) on July 12, 2022, on the NFT minting platform Legendao. It is the first feature film to be released as an NFT.

== Plot ==
The film is a comedy horror anthology centred around the phenomenon of the "Kilroy was here" graffiti.

In the frame story, a teenage babysitter tries to scare a child by telling her legends involving Killroy, and to never ever say his name three times.

In the first story, a mother poisons her daughter for years in order to pull off a charity scam, talking to the news and churches in order to get donations. The daughter, confused about what's happening with her, looks up the plant used in the tea her mother makes and discovers that it is poisonous. At a church meeting where her mother is raising funds, the daughter reveals the truth to everyone and kills herself in the name of Killroy, who then appears and kills everyone in the building.

In the second story, a teacher attempts to put on a play at an elementary school. One of the children tells her that another performer keeps trying to summon Killroy. The teacher looks more into the legend and learns that Killroy is used by parents in the town to scare their children into behaving. She sneaks into the school to investigate further, uncovering hundreds of drawings and stories about Killroy, spiralling into insanity. It's revealed to be a prank set up by the Janitor in order to scare her. However once a year, students disappear and, in order to save themselves, other students make a deal with Killroy to trick an adult into summoning him so he can claim a sacrifice. Killroy appears suddenly, killing the teacher and becoming more powerful.

In the third story, a priest takes children on a road trip to a camp site, but things take a turn when the children catch him smoking weed while driving, and a gas station cashier warns the boys that if anything bad happens, to summon Killroy. Making a different turn than the one to the campsite, the priest and children arrive at a motel. The priest is actually part of a pedophilia ring that takes immigrant children with parents in legal limbo, and sells them. The boys summon Killroy when the priest starts to attack, who quickly kills the priest.

In the final story, presented as a found footage film, a southern live-streamer lures gay men for sex, then shames them on camera, insulting and attacking them while viewers laugh. After being shamed on a live-stream, one victim commits suicide and the streamer holds a celebration stream for it, showing no remorse. Later, the streamer is kidnapped and tied to a tree. It's revealed that the victim's wife found the stream and wants revenge by feeding him to alligators, but before his death the streamer summons Killroy. Killroy appears and ties the wife to the same tree, killing her as well.

Returning to the frame story, the babysitter finds out her boyfriend has been cheating on her, so she tricks the child into thinking he's Killroy and killing him. When the child realises, she summons Killroy for real, who then kills the babysitter. The child takes Killroy's hand and he leads her into the nearby dark forest, their fate unknown.

== Cast ==
- Azita Ghanizada as Sarah
- Ryan O'Nan as Tom
- Harley Quinn Smith as Wendy
- Chris Jericho as The Gator Chaser
- Justin Kucsulain as KillRoy:
  Special makeup effects designer Robert Kurtzman described the titular character as a "long-nosed monster".
- Jason Mewes
- Ralph Garman as Priest
- Kathryn Parks
- Brendan Ragen
- Michael Perez
- Cindy De La Cruz

== Production ==
=== Development ===
In April 2014, Kevin Smith announced the Christmas-themed horror movie Anti-Claus, with a script based on the episode The Christmas Special of his Edumacation podcast. The script was co-written by his Edumacation co-host Andrew McElfresh, marking it the first script Smith collaborated on with another writer. Filming was initially scheduled for September 2014, with Tusk (2014) actors Justin Long, Michael Parks, and Haley Joel Osment returning as cast. The movie centered around the European folklore figure Krampus, a devil-esque creature who punishes naughty children.

Anti-Claus was eventually cancelled after the release of Krampus (2015) due to the similar story, and the movie was retooled to become KillRoy Was Here, based on the graffiti phenomenon.

=== Filming ===
Principal photography began on June 15, 2017, in Sarasota, Florida, with Brandon D. Hyde serving as cinematographer. The film also shot scenes in areas around Ringling College of Art and Design and Nathan Benderson Park, before moving to Longboat Key. In January 2018, Azita Ghanizada, Ryan O'Nan, Justin Kucsulain, Kathryn Parks, Brendan Ragen, Michael Perez, and Cindy De La Cruz were confirmed to be starring in the film, while Andrew McElfresh, Tony Stopperan, Joe Restaino, Nick Morgulis, Jordan Monsanto, and Adam Yeremian signed on as producers. In the same month, Smith's daughter, Harley Quinn Smith, joined the cast. In August 2018, Chris Jericho was confirmed to star in the film, before filming wrapped in October 2018.

=== Post-production ===
In April 2020, Smith revealed that the tone and style of KillRoy Was Here were inspired by Creepshow (1982), another comedy horror anthology film. Robert Kurtzman designed the titular character, describing it as a "long-nosed monster". Simon Taufique was revealed to have composed the score for the film. By April 2022, Jason Mewes and Ralph Garman were confirmed to appear in the film.

== Release ==
In February 2020, before the COVID-19 lockdowns, the film was set for a 2020 theatrical release. In July 2020, during San Diego Comic-Con@Home, Smith indicated that the theatrical release had been pushed back to 2021. In April 2021, it was announced that the film would be released exclusively as a non-fungible token (NFT). KillRoy Was Here was ultimately released via NFT minting platform Legendao as 5,555 exclusive tokens on July 12, 2022.

Smith explained how the movie was released as an NFT, saying, "When it was all done, I had this movie; perfectly watchable, Creepshow type of movie. So I reached out to Shudder and I was like, 'Hey man, you guys wanna run this? It's a Kevin Smith original, kind of horror movie. 30 grand.' That was it. Shudder was like, 'This is terrible. This isn't good enough for Shudder.' Then our producer on the movie, David [Shapiro], he goes, 'I met with this company, they are interested in buying a movie to release as an NFT. The first movie to release as an NFT, and what they wanna do is use it to showcase their blockchain technology.' And I was like, 'Oh, all right.' Perhaps this is another version of indie film, this is a new playground to go play in. Company paid us over a million dollars. I made a million dollars off of this movie. 'Not good enough for Shudder.'"
