= Monique Gabriela Curnen =

American actress

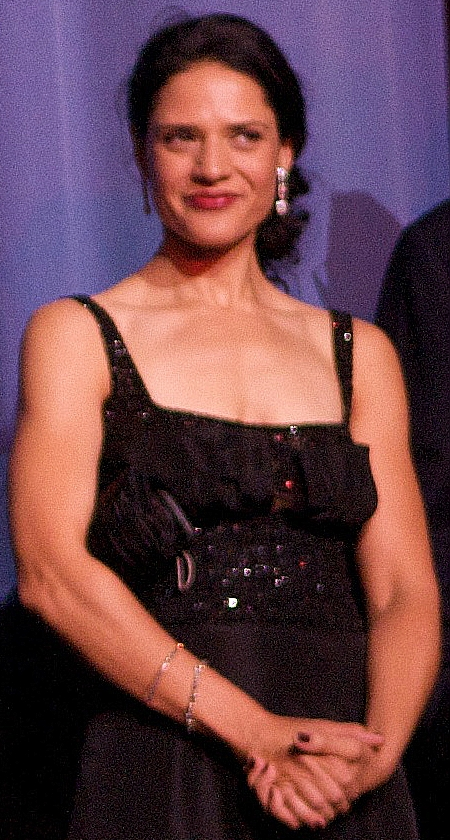
- Curnen in 2008
- Born: September 7, 1970 (age 55)
- Education: Williams College
- Occupation: Actress
- Years active: 2001–present

Monique Gabriela Curnen (born September 7, 1970) is an American actress.

== Early life and education ==
Curnen was born on September 7, 1970. Her mother is from Puerto Rico, and her father is of German and Irish descent. She grew up in Framingham, Massachusetts and went to Williams College, where she concentrated on other studies. After college, she spent a year (1992–93) as a full-time intern at Unity House, the Minority Cultural Center, at Connecticut College in New London. She then moved to New York and started taking acting classes and going to auditions.

== Career ==
Curnen has appeared in several films including Bollywood Calling (2001), Half Nelson (2006) and The Dark Knight (2008), in which she played corrupt Police Detective Anna Ramirez. She also played the colleague of Paul Walker's character Brian O'Connor in Fast & Furious (2009) in a cameo.

She has also appeared in numerous television series including Dexter (in the season 1 episodes "Let's Give the Boy a Hand" and "Love American Style"), House M.D. (in the episode "House Training", 2007) and Law & Order: Special Victims Unit (in the episode "Quickie", 2010). She played Detective Allison Beaumont in the 2009 police procedural drama series The Unusuals. She has appeared on the television series Sons of Anarchy, playing Amelia Dominguez. She appeared in the season finale of Season 2 of Lie to Me ("Black and White", 2010) as Detective Sharon Wallowski, whom she continued to play in Season 3 in a major recurring role. She appeared in a 2014 episode of the TV series Person of Interest as Precinct Captain Moreno, and two episodes in Season 4 of the television series Elementary as Detective Gina Cortes and then in The Mentalist as Tamsin Wade in the fifth season. Curnen joined the main cast for the final (2019–20) season of the Starz television series Power, playing Detective Blanca Rodriguez.

== Filmography ==
=== Film ===
Year	Title	Role	Notes
2001	Bollywood Calling	Isabel	
2001	Kate & Leopold	Monica Martinez	Uncredited
2002	Kat, Shaun & Oz	Joel Stanley	
2002	Untitled: A Love Story	Orgasm Girl	
2003	Romantic Love	Tara Rosenthal	Short
2004	Maria Full of Grace	Receptionist	
2004	Poster Boy	Female Reporter	
2005	The Reckoning	Jessica	Short
2005	Wake of the Fallen Sun	Co-Worker #2	Short
2006	Half Nelson	Isabel Redding	
2006	Lady in the Water	Perez de la Torre Sister #4	
2006	Bernard and Doris	Paloma	
2007	Finishing the Game	Saraghina Rivas	
2007	Anamorph	Female Student	
2008	California King	Gwen	Short
2008	Life in Flight	Janey	
2008	Che	Secretary	
2008	The Dark Knight	Detective Anna Ramirez	
2008	Manny	Lisa	
2009	Spoken Word	Gabrielle	
2009	Fast & Furious	FBI Agent	
2009	How to Make a Dollarbill in Brooklyn	Maria	
2010	Legacy	Valentina Gray	
2011	Stuck	Sherry	Short
2011	The Good Doctor	Nurse Maryanne	
2011	Contagion	Lorraine Vasquez	
2011	Happy New Year	Lisa	
2011	The Truth About Angels	Anna Scelta	
2012	Sunset Stories	May	
2013	The Gelephant	Sara	
2013	Dystopia	The Newscaster	
2013	Noël	Christina	Short
2014	Sunken City	Donna Cruz	
2014	No Names	Liz	Short
2016	Year by the Sea	Luce	
2018	Anyone Home?	Camila	
2020	Troubled Waters	Shelley Barrett	
2021	iGilbert	Doctor	
2023	Birth/Rebirth	Rita	
2025	Be True to Your School	Martinez	
TBA	Badge of Lies	Lauren	

=== Television ===
Year	Title	Role	Notes
2004	The Jury	Gloria Nunez	Episode: "The Honeymoon Suite"
2005	Angel	Port Authority Attendant	TV Movie
2006	Shark	Claudia Reyes	Episode: "Fashion Police"
2006	Dexter	Yelina	Episode: "Let's Give the Boy a Hand", "Love American Style"
2006	Shark	Claudia Reyes	Episode: "Fashion Police"
2007	Day Break	Alma Zapanta	Episode: "What If He's Free?"
2007	House M.D.	Lupe	Episode: "House Training"
2007	The Unit	Sgt. Rosas	Episode: "Paradise Lost"
2007	Journeyman	Nicole Gaines	Episode: "A Love of a Lifetime"
2007	Without a Trace	Arona Santa Cruz	Episode: "Clean Up"
2008	ER	Nurse Blanca	Episode: "Heal Thyself"
2009	The Unusuals	Detective Allison Beaumont	Main role.
2009	CSI: Miami	Danielle Hansen	Episode: "Hostile Takeover"
2010	Sons of Anarchy	Amelia Dominguez	3 episodes
2010–2026	Law & Order: Special Victims Unit	Attorney Owens/Jocelyn Fronczak	Episode: "Quickie"; Episode: "Monster"
2010–2011	Lie to Me	Detective Sharon Wallowski	Recurring (seasons 2–3)
2011	CSI: Crime Scene Investigation	Xiomara Garcia	3 episodes
2012	Touch	Lisette	Episode: "Kite Strings"
2012	The Mentalist	Tamsin Wade	Fifth season
2012	Dark Horse	FBI Agent Tracy Meyers	TV Movie
2013	Longmire	Amaya Vyas	Episode: "Death Came In Like Thunder"
2013	Ironside	Legal Aid Official	Episode: "Sleeping Dogs"
2013	Hawaii Five-0	FBI Special Agent Rebecca Conway	Episode: "Pukana"
2014	Revenge	Detective Reyes	Episode: "Execution"
2014	Person of Interest	Precinct Captain Moreno	Episode: "Wingman"
2014	Agents of S.H.I.E.L.D.	Janice Robbins	Episode: "The Writing on the Wall"
2015	The Following	Erin Sloan	Recurring role; 9 episodes
2015	Elementary	Detective Gina Cortes	2 episodes
2017	Taken	Vlasik	Main role
2018	NCIS: Los Angeles	ADA Sofia Lopez	Episode: "Pro Se"
2018–2020	Power	Blanca Rodriguez	Recurring role (season 5), Main role (season 6)
2019	God Friended Me	Officer Sarah Matthews	Episode: "From Paris With Love"
2020	Lincoln Rhyme - Hunt For The Bone Collector	Linda Vaughn	Episode 7 'Requiem'
2020	Away	Melissa Ramirez	Recurring role, 8 episodes
2020, 2022–2024	Power Book II: Ghost	Blanca Rodriguez	Recurring (season 1), Guest (seasons 2 & 4), Main (season 3). 16 episodes
2022	Power Book IV: Force	Blanca Rodriguez	Episode: "Family Business"
2026	The Rookie	Rita Sanchez	3 episodes

=== Video games ===
Year	Title	Role	Notes
2005	True Crime: New York City	Dispatcher	Credited as Monique Curnen
2006	25 to Life	Monica Francis	
