= Kite running =

Practice of running after kites that have been cut loose

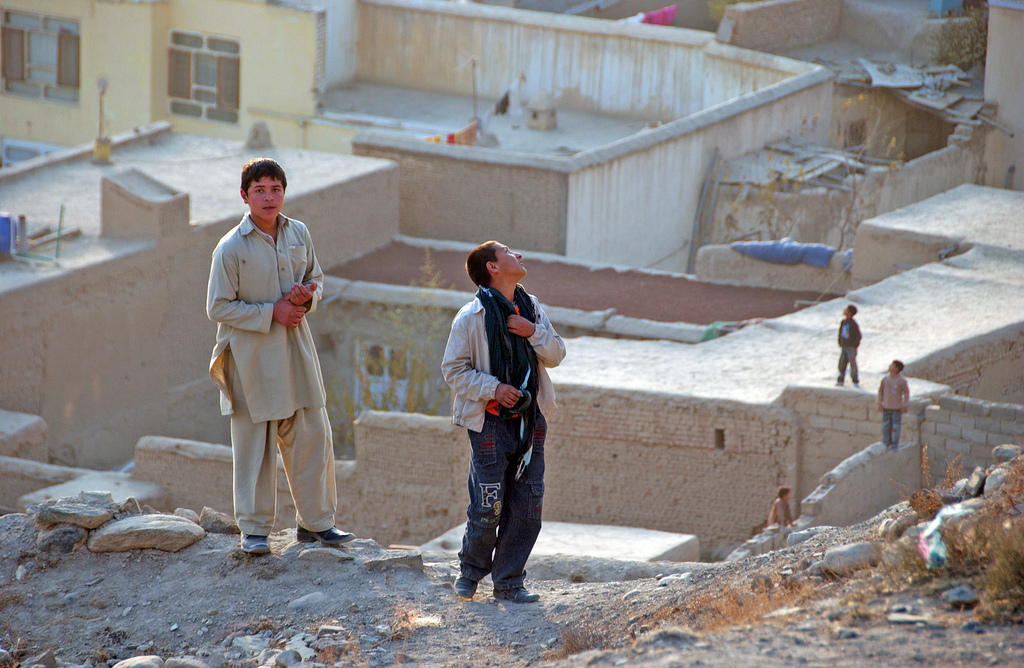
Kite runners on rooftops in Afghanistan, watching for drifting kites

Kite running is the practice of running after drifting kites in the sky that have been cut loose in kite fighting. Typically the custom is that the person who captures a cut kite can keep it, so the bigger and more expensive looking the kite, the more people can usually be seen running after it to try to capture it.

== Kite fights ==
Kite fighting is a popular pastime in the Indian subcontinent throughout the year and during kite flying festivals, and also in Afghanistan, Iran, in Chile and Brazil, and many other places throughout the world. In most cases, the fine string that is used to fly these kites is coated with powdered glass and flyers try to cut the string of the other kites.

== Running ==
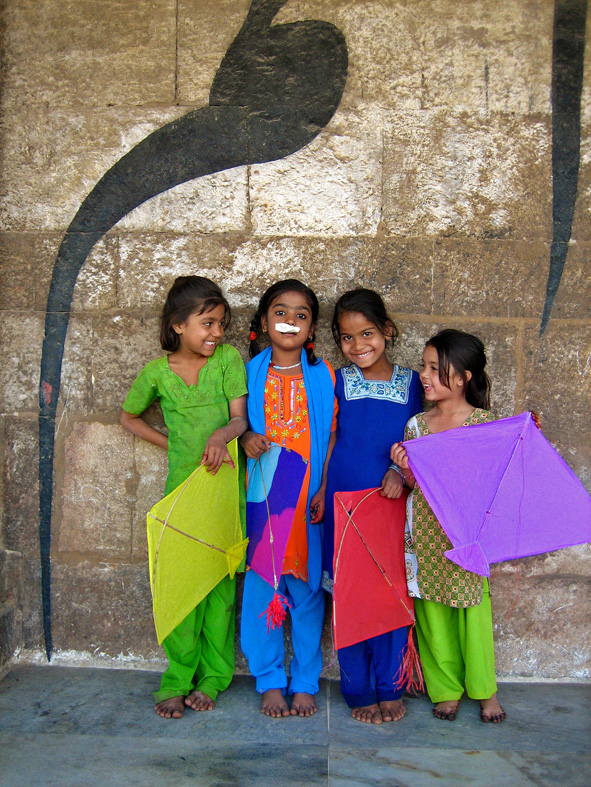
Kite runners at the Utarayana Kite Festival in Ahmedabad, Gujarat, India. The bandaged lip could indicate an injury caused by manja.

When the loser's kite string is cut, the kite drifts free with the wind until it falls to the ground. Kite running is the practice of running after these cut kites to try to capture them when they come down. Typically the custom is that the person who captures a cut kite can keep it. In cities and towns, the bigger and more expensive looking the kite, the more people can usually be seen running after it to try to capture it as their free prize.

Droves of people of all ages may run after a kite and try to capture it with the help of poles or broken off tree branches with which they try to entangle the loose string trailing with the kite. Running after and capturing these kites is often made more difficult when these drifting kites are taken long distances with the wind or fall atop trees, electric poles and houses over compound walls and fences, or in the middle of or across busy roads and railway lines.

== Dangers ==
Kite runners endanger their lives by running into the path of oncoming traffic and trains without looking down or fall from trees and buildings which they were trying to scale to get at kites that landed on top while gazing up and running after kites. They may walk around in the middle of congested towns and cities, and while gazing up may be dangerously unaware of what is happening on the ground in their immediate surroundings, causing injuries and collisions with traffic.

There have also been incidents with glass-coated kite strings causing injuries or damage where other people, birds, or electricity cables become entangled with the string. In particular, it is often responsible for throat injuries of children participating in the Makar Sankranti festival, where a popular challenge is to cut other kite strings with your own. This has led to a blanket ban on glass-coated strings in Mumbai, issued on December 14, 2016.

== Cultural references ==
Kite running has featured in a few books, including The Kite Runner written by Khaled Hosseini. In the book, the scars left by the manja while flying the kites are described as trophies by the schoolchildren who receive them.

== See also ==
- Kite
- Kite fighting
- Manja, the glass powder coated kite flying & fighting string
- Uttarayan, The kite flying festival of northern India
- The novel The Kite Runner, and the movie based on it
