= Thai kites =

Kite designs and competitions in Thailand

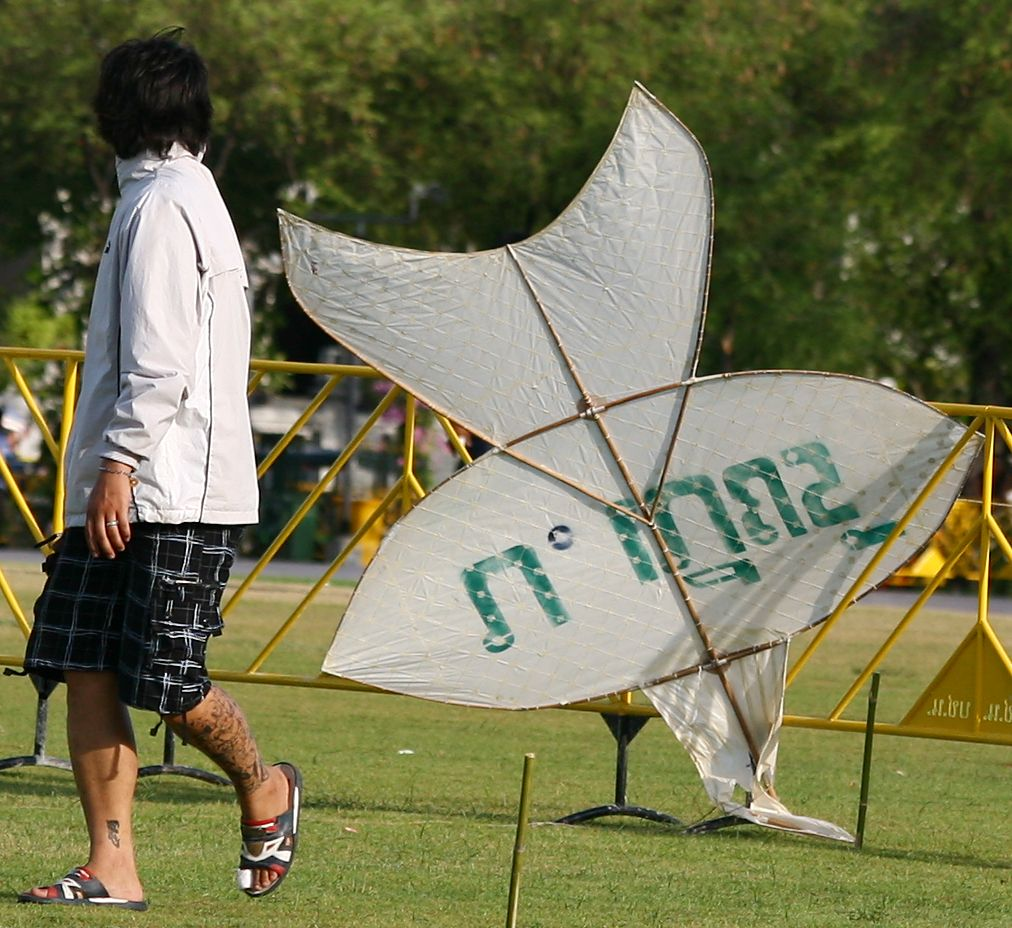
A traditional chula kite

Kites have been popular in Thai society for a long time. Since the Sukhothai period, King Ramkamhaeng fully supported kite flying, so kites became a main part of Thai culture. There was also evidence that King Rama V (1868-1910) of the Rattanakosin kingdom enjoyed kite flying very much so the formal competition of kite flying was firstly created in his reign. The famous venue for kite flying in Thailand is Sanam Luang (Thai: สนามหลวง), royal turf, which has been used since 1855 in Bangkok.

== History ==
Phra Ruang or Sri Intratit, one of the first Sukhothai King, was a kite enthusiast in the early 13th century. There is a story that led to a great adventure. He was flying his kite one day when the string broke and landed on a roof of nearby palace belonging to a well-known man called Phraya Aue. He decided to wait until nightfall before disguised as a commoner, climbing the palace walls and retrieving his kite. Suddenly, He remembered that Phraya Aue had a beautiful daughter. Therefore, he sought out the girl and spend the night with her. Though, the outcome of the romance is unknown.

== Types ==
There are various kinds of Thai kites, but the widely known are E-lum, Pakpao, Chula and Dui-dui kite.

E-lum (อีลุ้ม)
E-lum kite has the shape of rhombohedron. It is made of bamboo wood and the thin paper which covers the bamboo sticks. The tips of the two sides are tied up with tassel which helps to control the direction and helps its stability.
Pakpao (ปักเป้า)
The specification of Pakpao kite is similar to E-lum kite, but the structure of the wing parts is much stronger than E-loom. Moreover, the tail is longer and is made of clothes to balance the kite. Pakpao kite can be flown as an animal posture.
Chula (จุฬา)
Chula kite is in the shape of five rays of a star which made from five sticks of Seesuk (Thai: สีสุก) bamboo wood. The longest stick called “Petch mai” (Thai: เพชรไม้) is used to make the center line of kite and other two sticks are used to make the wing parts and the left to make the leg parts. The leg parts are shorter than the wing parts. The stretch is made of thread and covered with Sar paper (Thai: กระดาษสา).
Dui-dui (ดุ้ยดุ่ย)
Most of people believed that the origin of Dui-dui kite is from Chula kite. The shape is different from others. There’re a big oval at the top and a small oval at the middle of the kite. The two tails are in the shape of rectangular. It is made of Wai wood (Thai: ไม้หวาย). When the stick is attacked by wind, it makes the sound "dui-dui". Mostly, Dui-dui kite is created by monk and is usually played in the evening.

== Competitions ==
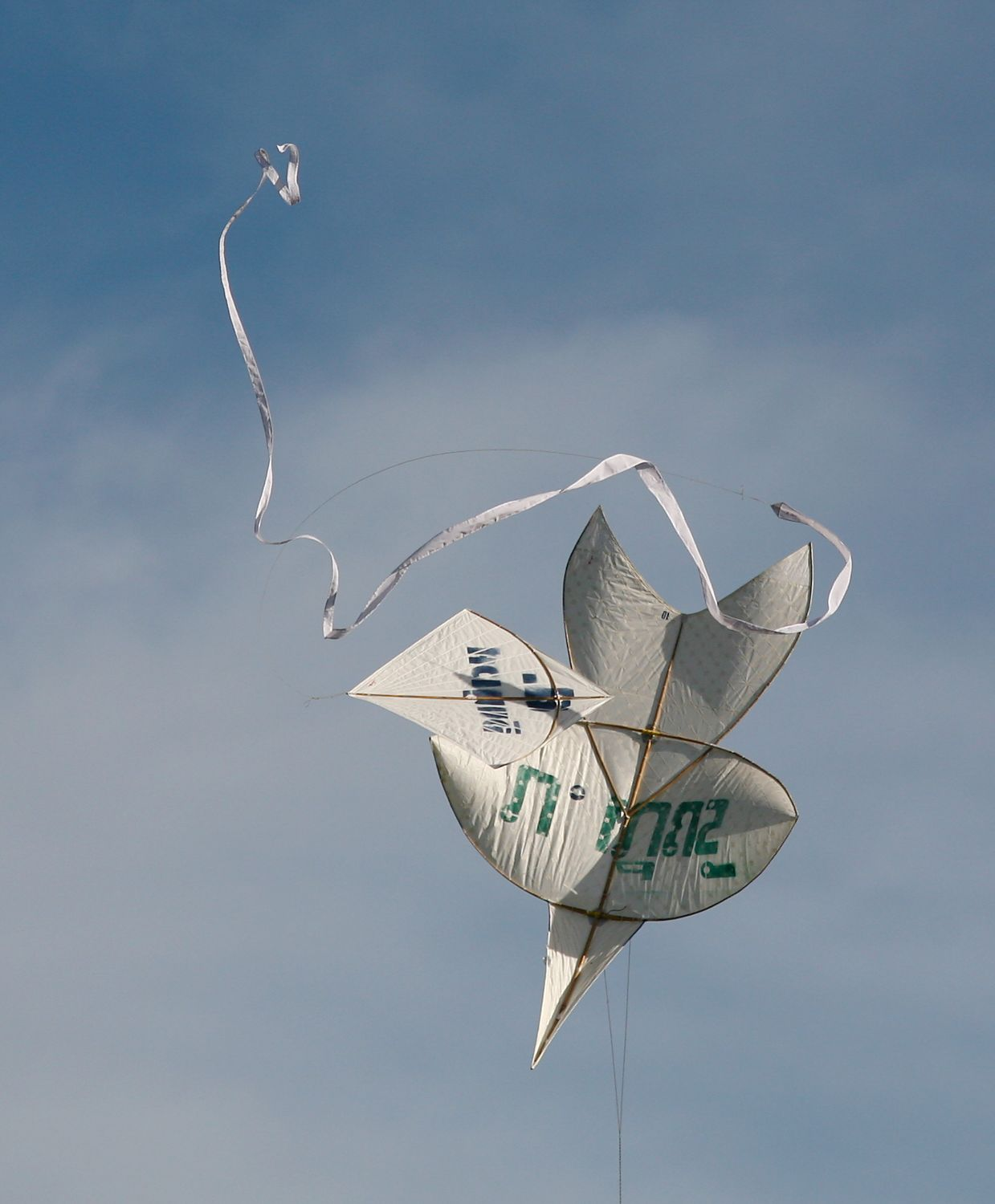
Duelling chula and pakpao kites

The enormous annual fighter kite competition between the Chula and Pakpao is what traditional Thai kite-flying is all about. In the past, contests spanned over two-month period, during which games were held every afternoon from March to April when the warm southern trade winds are at their best.

Nowadays, a few people can afford to spend their free time to go kite-flying. Therefore, the annual contest for the coveted King's Cup has been shortened and run only for 15 days in April. Dates and duration can be varied, which are depended upon the organizers in each year.

In facts, the Chula kite is larger than Pakpao kite. Hence, at least two Pakpao teams should compete against one Chula team for fairness. The whole game is approximately 90 minutes. However, the competition should be divided in 2 rounds. The positions of the Chula team and the Pakpao team are different because the Chula team stand at the edge of the field. On the other hands, the Pakpao team stand at the rope, which tied up to separate the field into 2 parts. Finally, the winner is the team who can drag the kite of the opponence downward into its own area.
