= Rick Porras =

American film producer

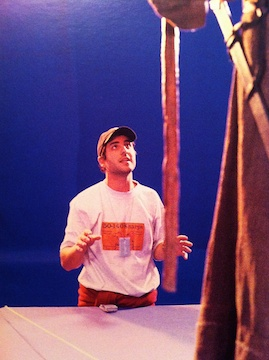
- Rick Porras on the set of Lord of the Rings
- Born: United States

Rick Porras is an American producer, notably co-producing The Lord of the Rings film trilogy.

He had a cameo appearance with Peter Jackson and other crew members in the special extended edition of The Return of the King as a Corsair pirate.

== Filmography ==
=== Producer ===
- Contact (1997): Associate producer
- The Lord of the Rings: The Fellowship of the Ring (2001): Co-producer
- The Lord of the Rings: The Two Towers (2002): Co-producer
- The Lord of the Rings: The Return of the King (2003): Co-producer
- Cártel, El (2006): Executive producer

=== Miscellaneous crew ===
- Death Becomes Her (1992): Production associate
- The Public Eye (1992): assistant to Robert Zemeckis
- Forrest Gump (1994): Archival Research Coordinator
- No Fate But What We Make: 'Terminator 2' and the Rise of Digital Effects (2003): Special thanks
- Big Dreams Little Tokyo (2006): Special thanks

=== Production manager ===
- Forrest Gump (1992): Post-production supervisor
- The Frighteners (1996): Post-production supervisor

=== Second unit director ===
- The Lord of the Rings: The Fellowship of the Ring (2001): Additional second-unit director
- The Lord of the Rings: The Two Towers (2002)
- The Lord of the Rings: The Return of the King (2003)

=== Actor ===
- The Lord of the Rings: The Two Towers (2002) - Gollums Stand-in
- The Lord of the Rings: The Return of the King (2003) - Eldacar (uncredited)
- King Kong (2005) - Gunner #2
