= The Kite Runner (film) =

- Theatrical release poster
- Directed by: Marc Forster
- Screenplay by: David Benioff
- Based on: The Kite Runner by Khaled Hosseini
- Produced by: William Horberg; Walter F. Parkes; Rebecca Yeldham; E. Bennett Walsh
- Starring: Khalid Abdalla; Homayoun Ershadi; Shaun Toub; Atossa Leoni; Saïd Taghmaoui
- Cinematography: Roberto Schaefer
- Edited by: Matt Chesse
- Music by: Alberto Iglesias
- Production companies: DreamWorks Pictures; Sidney Kimmel Entertainment; Participant Productions; Parkes+MacDonald; Neal Street Productions
- Distributed by: Paramount Classics
- Release date: December 14, 2007
- Running time: 128 minutes
- Country: United States
- Languages: Dari; English; Pashto; Urdu
- Budget: $20 million
- Box office: $73.2 million

The Kite Runner is a 2007 American drama film directed by Marc Forster from a screenplay by David Benioff and based on the 2003 novel of the same name by Khaled Hosseini. It tells the story of Amir, a well-to-do boy from the Wazir Akbar Khan district of Kabul who is tormented by the guilt of abandoning his friend Hassan. The story is set against a backdrop of tumultuous events, from the fall of the monarchy in Afghanistan through the Soviet military intervention, the mass exodus of Afghan refugees to Pakistan and the United States, and the Taliban regime.

Though most of the film is set in Afghanistan, these parts were mostly shot in Kashgar in Xinjiang, China, due to the dangers of filming in Afghanistan at the time. The majority of the film's dialogue is in Dari Persian, with the remainder spoken in English and a few short scenes in Pashto and Urdu. The child actors are native speakers, but several adult actors had to learn Dari. Filming wrapped up on December 21, 2006, and the film was expected to be released on November 2, 2007. However, after concern for the safety of the young actors in the film due to fears of violent reprisals to the sexual nature of some scenes in which they appear, its release date was pushed back six weeks to December 14, 2007. The controversial scenes also resulted in the film being banned from cinemas and distribution in Afghanistan itself.

Made on a budget of $20 million, the film earned $73.2 million worldwide. The film received moderately positive reviews from critics and was nominated for the Golden Globe Award for Best Foreign Language Film in 2007. The film's score by Alberto Iglesias was nominated for Best Original Score at the Golden Globes and the Academy Awards.

== Plot ==
In San Francisco in 2000, Afghan-American writer Amir Qadiri and his wife Soraya watch children flying kites. Arriving home, Amir receives a call from his father's old friend and business associate, Rahim Khan, now in Peshawar, Pakistan.

In Kabul in 1978, 10-year-old Amir is the son of a wealthy Pashtun philanthropist and iconoclast, known locally as Agha Sahib, whom Amir calls "Baba". His best friend, Hassan, is the son of Baba's long-time servant, Ali, a Hazara. Amir does kite fighting, and Hassan is his spool-holder and "kite runner", who can accurately predict where loose kites will land, and has deadly aim with a slingshot. On Hassan's birthday, Amir gifts Hassan a US-made slingshot.

In a kite-fighting contest, Amir breaks his father's record of 14 "kills", and Hassan runs after the last defeated kite. Amir finds Hassan trapped in a dead-end by Assef and his gang. Assef demands Amir's kite but Hassan refuses, so they beat and rape him.

Amir watches, too afraid to intervene. Wracked with guilt, he then avoids Hassan. When Ali and Baba ask Amir about Hassan's strange behavior, he feigns ignorance. Amir asks Baba if he would ever replace Ali and Hassan and is angrily rebuked.

Upset by the incident, Amir can't enjoy his 11th birthday party. The next day, he makes it look as if Hassan stole his birthday wristwatch and Hassan accepts the blame. Although Baba quickly forgives him, Ali feels dishonored, and immediately quits, to Baba's distress.

In June 1979, when the Soviet Union invades Afghanistan, Baba and Amir flee to Pakistan inside an oil truck, with Rahim being left to care for the house.

In 1988, Baba is running a service station in Fremont, California, and operates a stall at a weekly flea market. Amir, who has earned a degree at the local community college, works with Baba. One day, at the market, Baba introduces him to General Taheri, a Pashtun and former Afghan army officer. When Amir sees Taheri's daughter, Soraya, he's interested, and gives her a story he has written, but the General confiscates it.

Soon after, Baba is diagnosed with terminal lung cancer. Amir requests he ask General Taheri for Soraya's hand in marriage, which Baba does. During a stroll, Soraya tells Amir that the Taheris had to move from Virginia, due to the gossip after she had run off to live with a Pashtun man. Her father retrieved her, and they moved to California. Amir is shocked, but still pledges his love, and they marry. Baba dies soon afterward.

In 2000, Rahim convinces Amir to visit him in Pakistan to make amends. In Peshawar, a dying Rahim tells Amir that he had asked Hassan to return, which he did, with his wife and son, Sohrab. Later, Rahim had fled to Pakistan leaving the house to Hassan and his family. After the civil war, the Taliban had taken power and they demanded Hassan vacate the house. He refused, so they executed him and his wife, and Sohrab was taken to an orphanage.

Rahim urges Amir to return to Kabul to find Sohrab and give him a letter written by Hassan, who had taught himself to read and write. Amir declines until Rahim reveals that Amir and Hassan are half-brothers: Hassan was the result of an affair between Amir's father and Ali's wife.

Amir, wearing a false beard to conform with the strictures of the Taliban, looks for Sohrab in a Kabul orphanage, but learns he had been purchased by a Taliban official. Arranging an appointment at the official's house, he is surprised to find that his assistant is Assef, who recognizes Amir. Assef introduces Sohrab as his dance boy and beats Amir for asking to take Sohrab to America. Sohrab pulls out Hassan's slingshot and shoots Assef in the eye. Sohrab and the injured Amir flee to Peshawar, where they discover Rahim has died, leaving a letter for Amir.

In San Francisco, Amir and Soraya welcome Sohrab into their home. Amir teaches Sohrab to fly kites and volunteers to be Sohrab's "runner". As Amir runs off to fetch a defeated kite, he repeats to Sohrab what Hassan had said to him when they were boys: "For you, a thousand times over."

== Cast ==
- Khalid Abdalla as Amir Qadiri, a young novelist who fled to the U.S. as a boy during the Soviet invasion of Afghanistan
  - Zekiria Ebrahimi as Young Amir
- Homayoun Ershadi as the Agha Sahib (Baba)
- Shaun Toub as Rahim Khan
- Atossa Leoni as Soraya, the daughter of General Taheri and Amir's spouse
- Saïd Taghmaoui as Farid
- Ali Danish Bakhtyari as Sohrab
- Ahmad Khan Mahmoodzada as Hassan, Amir's childhood friend who was the victim of brutal torment, later revealed as Amir's brother
- Abdul Salaam Yusoufzai as Assef, Amir and Hassan's childhood tormenter who became a Taliban official as an adult
  - Elham Ehsas as Young Assef
- Bahram Ehsas as Young Wali
- Maimoona Ghezal as Jamila Taheri
- Abdul Qadir Farookh as General Taheri
- Khaled Hosseini (cameo) as Doctor in the park
- Camilo Cuervo as a Taliban Soldier
- Nasser Memarzia as Zaman, an orphanage director
- Mohamad Amin Rahimi as a Taliban official who made speeches in Ghazi Stadium
- Chris Verrill as Dr. Starobin, a Russian-American doctor
- Amar Kureishi as Dr. Amani, an Iranian doctor
- Nabi Tanha as Ali, Agha Sahib's house servant
- Ehsan Aman (cameo) as a singer at Amir's and Soraya's wedding
- Mehboob Ali as Amir's taxi driver in Pakistan

The two child actors were aged 11 and 12 at the time of the filming.

== Production ==
Due to the dangers of filming in Afghanistan, much of the film was instead shot in the western Chinese city of Kashgar, which is located about 800 kilometres (500 mi) from Kabul and shares many visual similarities.

== Critical reception ==
On the review aggregator website Rotten Tomatoes, 65% of 178 critics' reviews are positive, with an average rating of 6.20/10. The website's consensus reads: "Despite some fine performances, The Kite Runner is just shy of rendering the magic of the novel on to the big screen." On Metacritic, the film has an average score of 61 out of 100, based on 34 reviews, indicating "generally favorable reviews".

Praise was given to the film's actors, particularly Mahmoodzada, Ebrahimi, and Ershadi. Mick LaSalle of the San Francisco Chronicle wrote "it's a worthy piece of work. But the terseness of Hosseini's prose has been replaced by the sentimentality of director Marc Forster's approach, and the result is a film that's longer and lusher and gushier than it should have been." The New York Times critic Manohla Dargis criticized David Benioff's script, saying it "gestures in the direction of Communists and mullahs, the Soviet invaders and the Taliban insurgents, but none of these players figure into the story in any meaningful fashion". LaSalle and Dargis criticized the use of the rape scene.

Roger Ebert of the Chicago Sun-Times named it the 5th best film of 2007.

== Controversy ==
Though the child actors enjoyed making the film, they and their families expressed worries about their situation after the film's release. Regarding one scene, Ahmad Khan Mahmoodzada (young Hassan) said, "I want to continue making films and be an actor but the rape scene upset me because my friends will watch it and I won't be able to go outside any more. They will think I was raped." The scene was depicted in a less harrowing manner than originally planned; it contained no nudity, and the sexual aspect of the attack was suggested only very briefly at the end of the scene (also, a body double was used). There were also fears of intertribal reprisals, as the character Hassan was a Hazara and the boys who bullied and raped him were Pashtun.

The government of Afghanistan at the time, led by President Hamid Karzai, decided to ban the film from theaters and DVD shops, both because of the rape scene and the ethnic tensions. The deputy Information and Culture minister said: "It showed the ethnic groups of Afghanistan in a bad light. We respect freedom of speech, we support freedom of speech, but unfortunately we have difficulties in Afghan society, and if this film is shown in the cinemas, it is humiliating for one of our ethnic groups."

For their work on the movie, Zekeria Ebrahimi (young Amir) and Mahmoodzada were initially paid $17,500 (£9,000) each, and Ali Danish $13,700 (£7,000). Arguments were later made that the boys were underpaid. Additionally, Ebrahimi has said, "We want to study in the United States. It's a modern country and more safe than here in Kabul. If I became rich here I would be worried about security. It's dangerous to have money because of the kidnapping." Paramount relocated the two child actors, as well M. Ali Danish Bakhtyari (Sohrab) and another child actor with a minor role as Omar, to the United Arab Emirates. The studio reportedly accepted responsibility for the boys' living expenses until they reached adulthood, a cost some estimated at up to $500,000.

After four months in Dubai, Ebrahimi and his aunt returned to Kabul in March 2008. After receiving threats on his life, Ebrahimi was forced to remain indoors and be home-schooled by an uncle. He has since claimed that he wishes he had never appeared in the movie. Mahmoodzada stayed in Dubai for two years but returned to Kabul because his other family members could not get a visa to join him. Back home, he was continuously targeted by both the Hazara Shia's (for portraying them as a weak community) and by Pashtun Sunni (for portraying them as bad and cruel). The repeated humiliation resulted in Mahmoodzada—with the help of human smugglers—moving to Sweden; as of 2017, he was living in Borlänge.

== Awards and nominations ==
| Year | Award | Category | Result |
|---|---|---|---|
| 2008 | 80th Academy Awards | Best Original Score – Alberto Iglesias | Nominated |
| 2008 | 65th Golden Globe Awards | Best Original Score – Motion Picture: Alberto Iglesias | Nominated |
| 2008 | 65th Golden Globe Awards | Best Foreign Language Film USA | Nominated |
| 2008 | 61st BAFTA Awards | Anthony Asquith Award for Film Music – Alberto Iglesias | Nominated |
| 2008 | 61st BAFTA Awards | Best Screenplay – Adapted: David Benioff | Nominated |
| 2008 | 61st BAFTA Awards | Best Film Not in the English Language | Nominated |
| 2008 | 7th AARP Movies for Grownups Awards | Best Supporting Actor – Homayoun Ershadi | Nominated |
| 2008 | 7th AARP Movies for Grownups Awards | Best Movie for Grownups | Nominated |
| 2008 | Art Directors Guild Awards | Contemporary Film | Nominated |
| 2008 | 13th Broadcast Film Critics Association Awards | Best Young Actor – Ahmad Khan Mahmoodzada | Won |
| 2008 | 13th Broadcast Film Critics Association Awards | Best Picture | Nominated |
| 2008 | Christopher Awards | Feature Films | Won |
| 2007 | Dallas-Fort Worth Film Critics Association Awards 2007 | Best Picture | Nominated |
| 2008 | Hollywood Post Alliance | Outstanding Color Grading Feature Film in a DI Process | Nominated |
| 2008 | Houston Film Critics Society Awards 2007 | Best Foreign Language Film | Nominated |
| 2007 | International Film Music Critics Awards (IFMCA) | Best Original Score for a Drama Film – Alberto Iglesias | Nominated |
| 2007 | National Board of Review Awards 2007 | Top Ten Films | Won |
| 2008 | North Texas Film Critics Association Awards | Best Foreign Language Film | Won |
| 2007 | 12th Satellite Awards | Best Original Score – Alberto Iglesias | Won |
| 2007 | 12th Satellite Awards | Best Screenplay, Adapted – David Benioff | Nominated |
| 2007 | St. Louis Film Critics Association Awards 2007 | Best Film | Nominated |
| 2007 | St. Louis Film Critics Association Awards 2007 | Best Foreign Language Film (Afghanistan) | Nominated |
| 2007 | St. Louis Film Critics Association Awards 2007 | Best Cinematography – Roberto Schaefer | Nominated |
| 2008 | Visual Effects Society Awards | Outstanding Supporting Visual Effects in a Motion Picture | Nominated |
| 2008 | World Soundtrack Awards | Soundtrack Composer of the Year – Alberto Iglesias | Nominated |
| 2008 | World Soundtrack Awards | M13 | Nominated |
| 2008 | 29th Young Artist Awards | Best Performance in an International Feature Film – Leading Young Performer: Zekeria Ebrahimi | Nominated |
| 2008 | 29th Young Artist Awards | Best Performance in an International Feature Film – Leading Young Performer: Ahmad Khan Mahmoodzada | Nominated |
