= List of frequent Kevin Smith collaborators =

Kevin Smith is an American screenwriter, actor, film producer, and director who often works with certain actors and crew members in multiple feature film directing projects.

The actors who collaborated with Smith most frequently are Jason Mewes, Jennifer Schwalbach Smith, and Jason Lee, who all appeared in nine and eight films, respectively.

Stan Lee, the famous American comic book writer, made extensive cameos in two of Smith’s films: Mallrats (1997) and Jay and Silent Bob Reboot (2019, posthumous appearance).

Film producer and actor Scott Mosier starred in six of Smith’s films and served as the producer of eight of them.

Other actors who frequently work with Smith include the following:

- Ben Affleck, and Walter Flanagan—for seven films
- Harley Quinn Smith, Smith’s daughter, Justin Long, and Betty Aberlin —for six films
- Matt Damon —for five films
- Joey Lauren Adams, Ethan Suplee, Ralph Garman, and Bryan Johnson—for four films
- George Carlin, Jason Biggs, Marilyn Ghigliotti, and Dwight Ewell—for three films

== Cast ==
Work Individual
Work Individual	Clerks	Mallrats	Chasing Amy	Dogma	Jay and Silent Bob Strike Back	Jersey Girl	Clerks II	Zack and Miri Make a Porno	Cop Out	Red State	Tusk	Yoga Hosers	Jay and Silent Bob Reboot	Clerks III	The 4:30 Movie	Total
Jason Mewes	Yes	Yes	Yes	Yes	Yes		Yes	Yes				Yes	Yes	Yes		10
Ernest O'Donnell	Yes		Yes	Yes	Yes	Yes			Yes	Yes			Yes	Yes		9
Ben Affleck		Yes	Yes	Yes	Yes	Yes	Yes						Yes	Yes		8
Jason Lee		Yes	Yes	Yes	Yes	Yes	Yes		Yes				Yes		Yes	9
Matt Damon			Yes	Yes	Yes	Yes							Yes			5
Brian O'Halloran	Yes	Yes	Yes	Yes	Yes		Yes						Yes	Yes	Yes	9
Jeff Anderson	Yes			Yes	Yes		Yes	Yes						Yes	Yes	7
Joey Lauren Adams		Yes	Yes		Yes								Yes			4
Betty Aberlin				Yes		Yes		Yes		Yes						4
Shannen Doherty		Yes			Yes											2
George Carlin				Yes	Yes	Yes										3
Chris Rock				Yes	Yes											2
Stan Lee		Yes										Yes	Yes			3
Ethan Suplee		Yes	Yes	Yes			Yes									4
Tracy Morgan					Yes				Yes							2
Jennifer Schwalbach Smith					Yes	Yes	Yes	Yes		Yes	Yes	Yes	Yes	Yes	Yes	10
Seann William Scott					Yes				Yes							2
Stephen Root						Yes				Yes						2
Zak Knutson							Yes				Yes					2
Jason Biggs					Yes	Yes							Yes			3
Marc Blucas					Yes					Yes						2
Johnny Depp											Yes	Yes				2
Justin Long								Yes			Yes	Yes	Yes	Yes	Yes	6
Michael Parks										Yes	Yes					2
Kevin Pollak									Yes	Yes						2
Adam Brody									Yes			Yes	Yes			3
Haley Joel Osment											Yes	Yes				2
Harley Quinn Smith					Yes	Yes	Yes				Yes	Yes	Yes	Yes	Yes	8
Lily-Rose Depp											Yes	Yes				2
Renee Humphrey		Yes			Yes											2
Guinevere Turner			Yes	Yes												2
Carmen Llywelyn			Yes		Yes											2
Dwight Ewell			Yes	Yes	Yes											3
Ralph Garman										Yes	Yes	Yes	Yes			4
Genesis Rodriguez											Yes	Yes				2
Harley Morenstein											Yes	Yes				2
Scott Mosier	Yes	Yes	Yes	Yes	Yes		Yes						Yes			7
Bryan Johnson		Yes		Yes	Yes								Yes			4
Walter Flanagan	Yes	Yes	Yes	Yes	Yes		Yes						Yes			7
Marilyn Ghigliotti	Yes												Yes	Yes		3
Craig Robinson								Yes	Yes				Yes			2
Diedrich Bader					Yes								Yes			2
Rosario Dawson							Yes						Yes	Yes		3
Trevor Fehrman							Yes							Yes		2
Jim Norton								Yes	Yes							2
Shannon Elizabeth					Yes								Yes			2
Alanis Morissette				Yes	Yes											2
James Van Der Beek					Yes								Yes			2
Brian Quinn				Yes									Yes			2

== See also ==
- Kevin Smith filmography
