= True North trilogy =

Horror trilogy directed by Kevin Smith

- Directed by: Kevin Smith
- Written by: Kevin Smith
- Produced by: Tusk; William D. Johnson; Sam Englebardt; Shannon McIntosh; David Greathouse; Yoga Hosers; Liz Destro; Jordan Monsanto; Jennifer Schwalbach; Moose Jaws; Jason Mewes; Scott Mosier
- Starring: Michael Parks; Justin Long; Haley Joel Osment; Genesis Rodriguez; Johnny Depp; Ralph Garman; Jason Mewes; Kevin Smith; Lily-Rose Depp; Harley Quinn Smith; Harley Morenstein
- Music by: Christopher Drake
- Production companies: SModcast Pictures; XYZ Films; Demarest Films (1); StarStream Media (2); Abbolita Films (2); Destro Films (2)
- Distributed by: A24 (1); Invincible Pictures (2)
- Release dates: September 6, 2014 (Tusk TIFF); September 19, 2014 (Tusk U.S.); January 24, 2016 (Yoga Hosers Sundance Film Festival); September 2, 2016 (Yoga Hosers U.S.)
- Running time: 101 minutes (1); 88 minutes (2)
- Country: United States
- Language: English
- Budget: $3 million (Tusk) $5 million (Yoga Hosers)
- Box office: $1.8 million (Tusk) $38,784 (Yoga Hosers)

The True North trilogy is a series of horror comedy films written and directed by Kevin Smith. It consists of the films Tusk (2014), Yoga Hosers (2016), and the in-development Moose Jaws.

== Films ==
Tusk is based on a story from Kevin Smith's SModcast podcast. It stars Michael Parks, Justin Long, Haley Joel Osment, Johnny Depp and Genesis Rodriguez. The film premiered at the Toronto International Film Festival, before it was released on September 19, 2014, by A24.

Yoga Hosers is a spin-off of Tusk. It stars Johnny Depp, alongside his daughter Lily-Rose Depp and Smith's daughter Harley Quinn Smith. Production began in August 2014. The film premiered at a midnight screening during the Sundance Film Festival. Invincible Pictures acquired distribution rights to the film, and released it on September 2, 2016.

The proposed third film in the trilogy, Moose Jaws, has been described by Smith as "just Jaws with a moose." In June 2015, Harley Morenstein confirmed that he would be the lead in the film, following appearances in the other two offerings, and Smith said that his daughter and Lily-Rose Depp would reprise their roles from Yoga Hosers. In January 2016, Smith confirmed that both Jay and Silent Bob would appear in Moose Jaws, thus setting the entire trilogy in the View Askewniverse, but in June 2020, he said that he had written the two characters out of the script. In 2017, Smith said that Johnny Depp would reprise his role as Guy LaPointe. In December 2022, Smith announced that Lionsgate had agreed to finance five new movies to be made by him, including Moose Jaws.

== Recurring cast ==
Actor/actress	Film	
Actor/actress	Tusk	Yoga Hosers
Johnny Depp	Guy LaPointe	Guy LaPointe
Lily-Rose Depp	Colleen Collette	Colleen Collette
Harley Quinn Smith	Colleen McKenzie	Colleen McKenzie
Ralph Garman	Detective Garmin	Andronicus Arcane
Justin Long	Wallace Bryton	Yogi Bayer
Harley Morenstein	Border Agent	Toilet Paper Man
Haley Joel Osment	Teddy Craft	Adrien Arcand
Genesis Rodriguez	Ally Leon	Ms. Wicklund

== Reception ==
=== Critical response ===
Film	Rotten Tomatoes	Metacritic
Tusk	45% (130 reviews)	55 (33 reviews)
Yoga Hosers	24% (62 reviews)	23 (17 reviews)
