= Christopher Parkinson =

Christopher or Chris Parkinson may refer to:

- Christopher Parkinson (MP) for Berwick-upon-Tweed (UK Parliament constituency)
- Chris Parkinson (musician), British folk musician
- Chris Parkinson (poet), British poet and prankster
- Chris Parkinson (broadcaster), New Zealand broadcaster
