= Cheats (film) =

2002 film

- Directed by: Andrew Gurland
- Written by: Andrew Gurland
- Produced by: Chris Bender; J.C. Spink; A. J. Dix
- Starring: Martin Starr; Matthew Lawrence; Trevor Fehrman; Elden Henson; Mary Tyler Moore
- Cinematography: Fred Murphy
- Edited by: Troy T. Takaki
- Music by: Mark Mothersbaugh
- Distributed by: New Line Cinema
- Release date: September 20, 2002
- Running time: 86 minutes
- Country: United States
- Language: English

Cheats is a 2002 American teen comedy film about four friends that have been cheating their way through high school, and have to face new challenges to avoid getting caught before going to college. The lead roles are played by Trevor Fehrman, Matthew Lawrence, and Mary Tyler Moore.

The original title of the movie was Cheaters but was thought that likely to be confused with the 2000 movie Cheaters starring Jeff Daniels and produced by New Line's sister company, HBO Films.

== Plot ==
Since kindergarten, Handsome Davis and Sammy Green have been stealing teachers' test answer keys to cheat on tests. By the time they're in middle school, they regularly have a classmate named Evan Rosengarten do their homework for them, and they pay Evan with hardcore porn videos that Handsome steals from his dad's collection. This ends when Evan's mom finds out that Handsome gave her son a bestiality tape, though Handsome counts on his dad being too ashamed to press the issue.

In high school, they expand their cheating operation by partnering with Victor Barone and Jon Applebee (the latter being their expert crib sheet maker), getting a copy of the janitor's master key, and trading answers to other classmates for money and favors. Principal Stark finds out the key was stolen and publicly announces that she's having all the school's locks changed. Handsome insists on stealing something to let their customers know they're still in business, and they end up offering Teddy Blue a chance to see the school psychologist's file on her; during the break-in, Applebee tries to call off the operation because he desperately doesn't want any of his teammates to read his own psychological file. They are caught by the janitor because of Applebee's hesitation, but manage to lie their way out.

Physics teacher Mr. Harkin is about to give an incredibly difficult midterm exam, and to steal his answer key, Handsome fakes a confession to Harkin about being sexually confused while Victor copies it. Victor tells Handsome they should cut ties with Applebee entirely, but Handsome gets him to settle for excluding Applebee from the upcoming physics midterm. They eventually reconcile, but tensions remain high between Victor and Applebee. Sammy starts getting tutored by a smart, upstanding classmate named Julie Merkel and tells Handsome that he doesn't want to cheat on tests anymore, but Handsome convinces Sammy to keep participating. Handsome, Sammy, and Victor cheat on the physics midterm, after which Harkin pulls the three of them aside to accuse them of cheating. Handsome denies cheating in a dramatic rant, during which he pulls off his shirt. Harkin believes him, while Sammy and Victor are reprimanded by Principal Stark.

World history teacher Mrs. Herman, nicknamed "the grade book" for keeping a meticulous written record of her students' daily behaviors, is about to give her class their final exam. Julie, resentful for being waitlisted by Tufts University and having to compete with cheaters for good grades, convinces the other girls to stop giving their notes to the boys. Sammy decides to exclude himself from cheating on the history final. Victor takes his frustration out on Herman's adopted sons with a cruel prank phone call, but is convinced by Handsome to apologize to them and recruit their help in stealing their mother's answer key. Victor and Handsome nickname them "Greedy" and "Horny" for demanding $400 and a date with a girl they both have a crush on. Victor receives the answer key from them, and the crew of six - Handsome, Victor, Applebee, and three new accomplices - forsake crib sheets in favor of making up an obscene song to help them memorize the answers. Principal Stark is convinced that Sammy and Victor have turned over a new leaf and decides not to punish them after all.

Towards the end of their senior year, Mrs. Herman uses her grade book as leverage against her students as they apply to college, spurring Handsome and Victor to steal and destroy it. The collective punishments imposed on the class and the lack of grading data, which jeopardizes their final grades, threaten to turn Handsome's and Victor's classmates against them. Principal Stark receives an anonymous letter that blames Victor alone for stealing the grade book, and Stark trusts Sammy - a founding member of the student court - to confirm Victor's guilt. Handsome, Victor, and Sammy (now working as a double agent to help his friends) suspect Applebee wrote the letter, and have to prevent anyone from Herman's class from naming them on their upcoming video depositions. Handsome tries to intimidate Julie by claiming that students will chant "Julie is a rat" at their graduation ceremony. Victor goes overboard in trying to intimidate Applebee, causing Applebee to immediately testify that Victor is guilty.

Sammy is able to offer Victor a plea bargain, in which he retakes world history at summer school to still get his diploma. Victor reveals Handsome's involvement in his guilty plea. Sammy offers Handsome the same plea bargain, which Handsome ultimately accepts. At graduation, Handsome apologizes to Applebee for having looked at his psychological profile earlier in the year, which stated that Applebee has a crooked penis. Mr. Harkin gives Handsome an achievement award in physics, to the crowd's shock - while narrating to the viewer, Handsome insists that he truly did pass the physics midterm without cheating, despite his pattern of doing so elsewhere. The crowd mocks Handsome by chanting "cheated on the midterm", to which Handsome happily shrugs. As the credits roll, it's revealed that Mrs. Herman's adopted sons wrote the anonymous letter to get revenge on Victor, Victor himself was also adopted, Sammy tried to have sex with Julie in her sleep, Mr. Harkin taught Handsome and Victor's summer school class, and that they wore skimpy clothing to try to ensure themselves A-grades, suggesting that Mr. Harkin himself is gay.

== Main cast ==
- Trevor Fehrman as Handsome Davis
- Elden Henson as Sammy Green
- Matthew Lawrence as Victor Barone
- Martin Starr as Jonathan Applebee
- Mary Tyler Moore as Mrs. Stark, Principal, North Point Academy
- Maggie Lawson as Julie Merkel
- Babz Chula as Mrs. Rosengarden
- David Krumholtz as Evan Rosengarden
- Dixon Cohee as Greedy Herman
- Griffin Dunne as Mr. Davis, Handsome's father
- Morris Panych as Mr. Alex Harkin
- Will Sanderson as Rexler
- Jewel Staite as Teddy Blue
- Bill Switzer as Garret
- Tseng Chang as Marty
- Barbara Tyson as Mrs. Herman
- Kathryn Anderson as 2nd Grade Teacher
- Brett Kelly as Young Sammy
- Casey Dubois as Handsome (2nd Grade / Kindergarten)
- Leonie Haworth as Julie (2nd Grade)

== Release ==
The film was scheduled to be released in 2001, but was delayed until September 20, 2002. It was released on DVD and VHS in 2003.

== Documentary ==
On the DVD edition, there is an 18-minute documentary showing people whose real-life events the story is based on, more than 10 years earlier. The real Jonathan Applebee refused to take part in the special feature documentary based on the actual Cheats, so his name had to be censored whenever used.
