= Bogus (film) =

- Theatrical release poster
- Directed by: Norman Jewison
- Screenplay by: Alvin Sargent
- Story by: Jeff Rothberg; Francis X. McCarthy
- Produced by: Norman Jewison; Arnon Milchan; Jeff Rothberg
- Starring: Whoopi Goldberg; Gérard Depardieu; Haley Joel Osment; Denis Mercier; Nancy Travis
- Cinematography: David Watkin
- Edited by: Stephen E. Rivkin
- Music by: Marc Shaiman
- Production companies: Regency Enterprises; Yorktown; New Regency
- Distributed by: Warner Bros.
- Release date: September 6, 1996
- Running time: 110 minutes
- Country: United States
- Languages: English; French
- Budget: $25 million
- Box office: $4.4 million

Bogus is a 1996 American urban fantasy comedy-drama film directed by Norman Jewison from a screenplay written by Alvin Sargent, and starring Whoopi Goldberg, Gérard Depardieu, and Haley Joel Osment. An African-American restaurant supply manager (Goldberg) becomes the foster mother of an orphan Caucasian boy (Osment), after the death of his mother, who she was childhood friends with. In the meantime, they both see and hear an imaginary man named "Bogus" (Depardieu) who helps their new relationship.

It was filmed in Canada and New Jersey. The film was a box-office bomb.

== Plot ==
Albert Franklin is a seven year old boy, living with his single mother Lorraine in Nevada, who works as an assistant showgirl, for a famous Vegas magician named Antoine. Albert dreams of becoming a master magician, and looks up to Antoine as a mentor and father figure. One evening, while driving on her way home after work, Lorraine is inadvertently struck by a drunk driver, killing both. Albert is deeply distraught by Lorraine's death, as Lorraine, raised in foster care, was his only family.

Albert's likely guardian is unclear; Lorraine never married and never disclosed who Albert's biological father was. Antoine and his wife and assistant Babette are too busy on the road performing shows to adopt Albert, and neither Lorraine's friends nor Albert's elderly babysitter Mrs. Partridge can do so. However, Lorraine's last will and stipulates that her childhood foster sister, an African-American woman in New Jersey named Harriet Franklin, should be Albert's guardian in the event Lorraine cannot care for him.

Following the directions of Lorraine's will, the authorities inform Harriet (who works as a restaurant supplies manager with her best friend and secretary Penny) of Lorraine's passing, and that she was asked by Lorraine in her will to foster Albert. Harriet initially declines saying she cannot take in Albert due to her work life, and that Albert presumably is Caucasian, and Harriet for some reason sees that as a problem. However after being scolded by Lorraine's best friend Ruthie who is African-American as well, and the authorities informing Harriet that if she does decline to be Albert's guardian, Albert will be a ward of the state, Harriet reluctantly agrees.

Albert unhappily leaves his Nevada home by plane to Newark, New Jersey. After seeing a woman passenger on the plane that favors and looks identical to his mother, Albert runs to the lavatory on the plane and begins to cry. At this moment, a tall, long-haired Frenchman wearing a trench-coat named "Bogus" jumps out of a sketchbook in Albert's bag. Bogus is a friend no one else can see that Albert created to process Lorraine's passing. Albert explains his situation to Bogus, and though Albert isn't pleased to move in with Harriet, Bogus cheers Albert up, saying that Harriet will be a good new mother to him. Harriet picks Albert up at the airport, and their relationship starts off awkward with Albert being very shy and reserved and refusing to eat, and Harriet not having any parenting experience. Albert tells Bogus that he intends to run away with the inheritance money Lorraine left him, but Bogus implores Albert to give Harriet a chance.

Albert is having a hard time fitting in on his first day at his new school, (in which Bogus also accompanies Albert at school), from not participating in class and arguing with his teachers, and to the other boys badgering and bullying him due to him talking to his imaginary friend. Harriet gets caught in traffic and is late picking up Albert from school. Albert gets tired of waiting on Harriet and he walks around downtown Newark with Bogus. Harriet and the school administrators are worried about Albert's safety and start to look for him. Albert is eventually found playing in a park with Bogus, by Harriet. She then takes Albert to meet Harriet's boss Bob, who Albert likes, and Bob invites Albert to his son's birthday party.

At the party, Albert is having fun, however Harriet is annoyed and uncomfortable, and doesn't want to be there. She is asked by a magician to participate in the show and she refuses vehemently, and a bunch of children go up to tackle her, which she attacks the children back, disappointing Albert. That night, at home, Albert acknowledges that the party magician was terrible, and reveals to Harriet that he wishes to be a magician, and knows many magic tricks. However, Harriet isn't interested which again disappoints Albert. In the aftermath, Harriet begins to hear Bogus's voice faintly, telling her that she is intentionally shutting out Albert and wrongly keeping him at a distance.

As the weeks go on, and now that Albert and Harriet both are hearing and seeing Bogus, Albert and Harriet's relationship seems to slowly but surely improve, however due to Harriet trying to get a promotion from Bob, she isn't as home as much, and leaves Albert alone with several babysitters. One night, Albert becomes homesick, and notices a newspaper ad that says that Antoine and Babette are performing in Atlantic City which is nearby. Bogus tries his best to convince Albert not to leave, but Albert doesn't listen. While Albert's babysitter is sleeping, he sneaks out of the house, and catches a bus to see them. When Antoine and Babette shockingly discover Albert hiding in their dressing room, they are very unhappy that he left without telling Harriet, and again explain to him they cannot be his parents as they travel too much. While Antoine is calming Albert down, Babette calls Harriet, and Albert falls asleep. Harriet comes to pick Albert up, and brings him back home.

Once back home, after putting Albert to bed, Harriet who loves ballroom dancing, begins to daydream in the living room, with herself and Bogus dancing together. Harriet goes to check in on Albert, and notices Albert has gotten out of bed, and is climbing on the fire escape. He is sleepwalking and hallucinating, while hearing his mother’s voice. In Albert's mind Lorraine's voice is telling him to trust Harriet, and Albert does, as Harriet rescues Albert from the fire escape and drags him safely off the roof. Harriet promises that she will be a good mother to Albert, and Albert also accepts Harriet as his mother. Days later, Albert and Harriet pay respects at Lorraine's grave in Nevada. Albert and Harriet are seen playing in a park, and Bogus bids them farewell, saying to the audience that if you need him, he will be there. Bogus is then seen walking up to a lonely boy in the same park and starts to talk to him.

== Cast ==
- Whoopi Goldberg as Harriet Franklin
- Gérard Depardieu as Bogus
- Haley Joel Osment as Albert Franklin
- Nancy Travis as Lorraine Franklin
- Andrea Martin as Penny
- Denis Mercier as Monsieur Antoine
- Ute Lemper as Babette
- Sheryl Lee Ralph as Ruth Clark
- Al Waxman as School Principal
- Fiona Reid as School Teacher
- Kevin Jackson as Bob Morrison
- Richard Portnow as M. Clay Thrasher
- Stefan Batory as M. Clay Fisher
- Barbara Hamilton as Mrs. Partridge

== Filming location ==
Although portrayed as Newark, New Jersey, part of the film was filmed in the Van Vorst Park neighborhood of Downtown Jersey City. The apartment building that the character, Harriet, lives in at the corner of York Street and Barrow Street is called Madison on the Van Vorst Park.

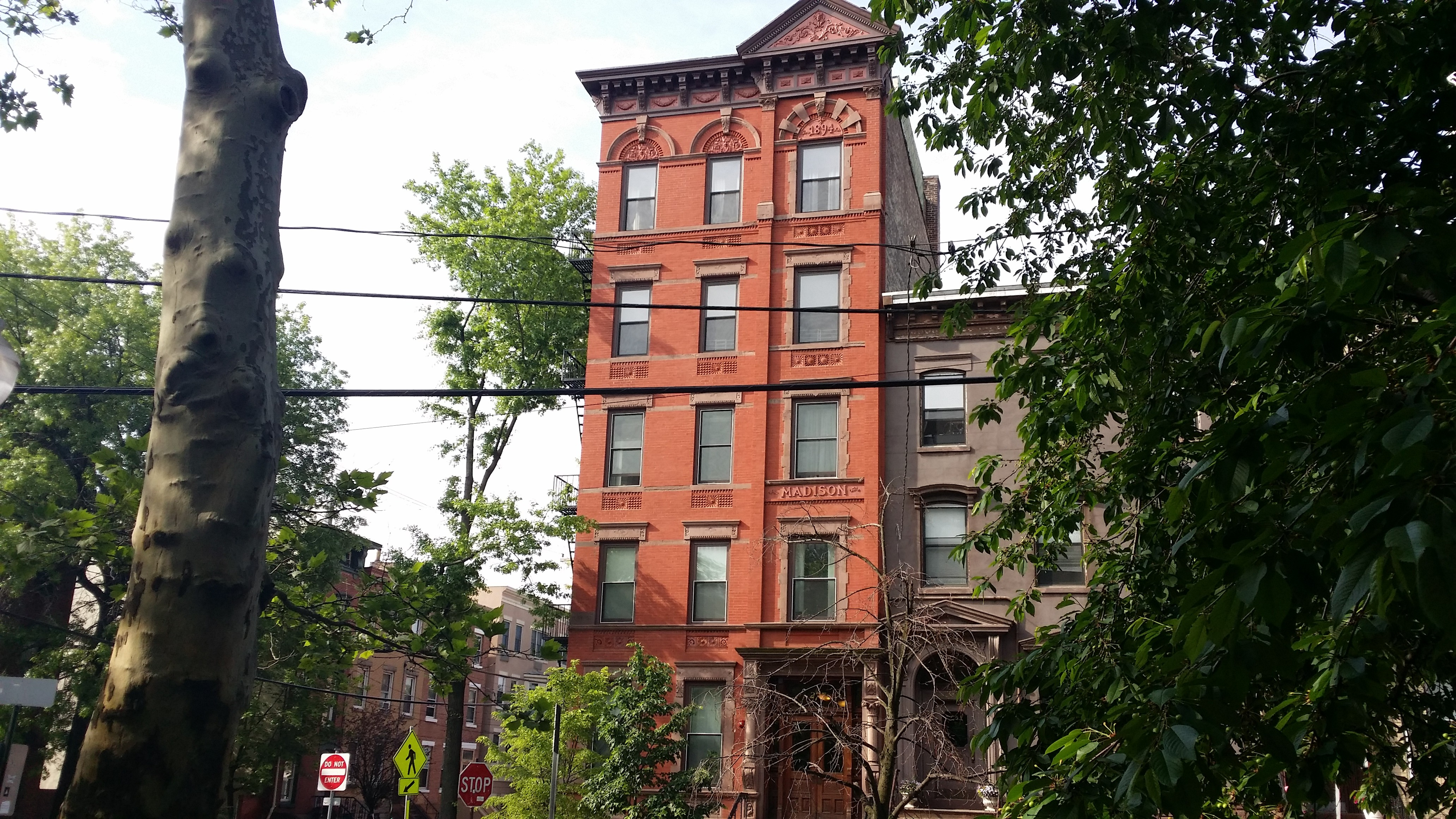
Madison on the Van Vorst Park

== Release ==
Bogus opened at #11 in its opening weekend with $1,895,593 and grossed $4,357,406 in the US.

== Reception ==
Rotten Tomatoes reports that 41% of 17 surveyed critics gave the film a positive review; the average rating is 5/10. Leonard Klady of Variety wrote, "Sweetly sentimental and anachronistically whimsical, Bogus is a modern metaphor oddly out of step with contemporary taste." Janet Maslin of The New York Times wrote, "Jewison lays on the dry ice and special effects without adding emotion to a slow, hackneyed story." Roger Ebert of the Chicago Sun-Times rated it 3/4 stars and called it "a charming, inconsequential fantasy" that wisely avoids realism. Audiences surveyed by CinemaScore gave the film a grade of "B+" on a scale of A+ to F.
