= Oh, What a Lovely Tea Party =

- Directed by: Malcolm Ingram; Jennifer Schwalbach
- Produced by: Kevin Smith
- Starring: Kevin Smith; Jason Mewes; Brian O'Halloran; Will Ferrell; Shannon Elizabeth; Ben Affleck; Matt Damon; Chris Rock; Jeff Anderson; George Carlin; Jon Stewart; Ali Larter; Judd Nelson; Jason Lee
- Cinematography: Malcolm Ingram
- Edited by: Mattt Potter
- Distributed by: View Askew Productions
- Release date: 2004
- Running time: 87 minutes
- Country: United States
- Language: English

Oh, What a Lovely Tea Party is a 2004 American documentary film about the making of Jay and Silent Bob Strike Back (2001), released and produced by Kevin Smith's View Askew Productions. Co-directed by Malcolm Ingram, it marks the directorial debut of Jennifer Schwalbach Smith (credited as Jennifer Schwalbach), Kevin Smith's wife. Initially over three hours, the film was made available in an 87-minute cut.

It was originally intended to be a bonus feature on the Jay and Silent Bob Strike Back DVD, but due to its length, it became a standalone feature. Plans for inclusion on the Clerks X DVD were scrapped for similar reasons. It has since been screened at several of Smith's "Vulgarthon" film festivals. According to an early 2009 Q&A session with Smith in Vancouver, the full film would be included on a future Blu-ray release of Clerks, ultimately being available on the November 2009 release.
