= The Misadventures of the Dunderheads =

- Directed by: D.G. Brock
- Written by: P.D. Hughen
- Produced by: Bruce Stubblefield
- Starring: Olympia Dukakis; Haley Joel Osment; Alison Brie; Veronica Cartwright; James MacDonald; Lew Temple; Ellen Geer
- Cinematography: James Mathers
- Edited by: Peter Devaney Flanagan; Stephen M. Rickert Jr.
- Music by: Greg Edmonson
- Release date: October 12, 2012 (LA Femme)
- Running time: 88 minutes
- Country: United States
- Language: English

The Misadventures of the Dunderheads, also known as Montana Amazon, is a 2012 American independent black comedy road feature film starring Olympia Dukakis, Haley Joel Osment, and Alison Brie.

== Plot ==
The Dunderheads are an eccentric Montana family who've been in the mountains far too long. Now one step ahead of the law, matriarch Grandma Ira careens across the American West with her two wildly dysfunctional teenage grandkids.

== Cast ==
- Olympia Dukakis – Ira Dunderhead
- Haley Joel Osment – Womple Dunderhead
- Alison Brie – Ella Dunderhead
  - Ariel Winter - Ella (age 9)
- Veronica Cartwright – Margaret
- Ellen Geer – Vernice
- Lew Temple – Trevor
- Angel Oquendo – Panicky Richard
- James MacDonald – Heirik

== Reception ==
The finished film premiered in October 2012 at the Los Angeles Femme International Film Festival where its director, D.G. Brock, won the Best Feature Film Director award. The film was shown theatrically in art houses across the South by The Southern Circuit in March and April 2013. It was shown on the Starz Movie Channels from 2013 through August 2014.

== Awards ==
The film, then titled Montana Amazon, won "Best Feature Film" at the 2010 "Big Apple Film Festival".

== Alternate version ==
In 2023, the film was recut to 83 minutes and retitled Montana Amazon Redux.
