= Man on a Ledge =

2012 American film by Asger Leth

- Theatrical release poster
- Directed by: Asger Leth
- Written by: Pablo Fenjves
- Produced by: Lorenzo di Bonaventura; Mark Vahradian
- Starring: Sam Worthington; Elizabeth Banks; Jamie Bell; Anthony Mackie; Ed Burns; Titus Welliver; Genesis Rodriguez; Kyra Sedgwick; Ed Harris
- Cinematography: Paul Cameron
- Edited by: Kevin Stitt
- Music by: Henry Jackman
- Production company: Di Bonaventura Pictures
- Distributed by: Summit Entertainment
- Release date: January 27, 2012
- Running time: 102 minutes
- Country: United States
- Language: English
- Budget: $42 million
- Box office: $47.6 million

Man on a Ledge is a 2012 American action thriller film directed by Asger Leth, starring Sam Worthington, Jamie Bell, Elizabeth Banks, Edward Burns, Anthony Mackie, Genesis Rodriguez, and Ed Harris. Filming took place in New York City on top of the Roosevelt Hotel. The film received generally mixed reviews from critics and grossed $47 million against its $42 million budget.

In the film, a man using an alias stages a suicide attempt and asks to speak with a specific police negotiator. He is himself a disgraced police officer who was convicted of a diamond theft, and seeks a way to clear his name. His associates try to prove that the diamond was never stolen, and that the "theft" was part of an insurance fraud scheme by the diamond's owner.

== Plot ==
A man named Joe Walker checks into the Roosevelt Hotel, enters his hotel room on the 21st floor, and climbs on the ledge, apparently ready to commit suicide. The crowd below calls the police. Dante Marcus controls the crowd, while Jack Dougherty talks with Walker. Walker will only speak to negotiator Lydia Mercer, who is on a leave of absence after failing to save a suicidal policeman. Mercer arrives at the hotel room and acquires Walker's fingerprints from a shared cigarette. Dougherty has them analyzed and discovers that "Walker" is actually Nick Cassidy, an ex-policeman who was given a 25-year sentence for stealing the Monarch Diamond from businessman David Englander; Nick escaped one month earlier during his father's funeral with the help of his younger brother Joey. Nick maintains his innocence and claims that Englander has framed him as part of an insurance fraud scheme, as Englander lost his fortune in a bad business deal and was too proud to sell the diamond.

Nick distracts the police while Joey and his girlfriend, Angie, break into Englander's vault across the street to recover the diamond and prove his innocence. Cassidy must use double entendres to provide instructions to Joey and Angie through an earpiece while speaking to Mercer. Dougherty informs Marcus of Nick's identity, and Marcus orders the jewelry store's security to check the vault. Joey and Angie evade them but do not find the diamond. They deliberately set off an alarm, trick Englander into retrieving the diamond from a smaller personal safe in his office, and ambush him, where they steal the diamond at gunpoint. Nick's ex-partner, Mike Ackerman, arrives at the hotel with evidence that Nick is planning something and demands to be allowed into the hotel room. Mercer distrusts him, and Dougherty backs her up. Ackerman claims he has found bomb schematics in a storage unit Nick rented and is convinced that he will detonate an explosive somewhere. While the crowd is evacuated by the bomb squad, Mercer, believing in Nick's innocence, calls internal affairs and discovers that three of the cops employed by Englander were suspected of being corrupt: Ackerman, Marcus, and the real (deceased) Joe Walker.

Joey and Angie enter the hotel and hand the bag containing the diamond to the hotel concierge. The concierge pockets the diamond while placing the bag onto the rack. Englander calls Marcus, one of the corrupt cops who helped him frame Nick, and has him capture Joey and Angie as they reach the street. Nick attempts to escape through the hotel, pursued by a tactical team. The concierge aids him by handing him a disguise containing the diamond. Marcus chases Nick to the roof, where he has Mercer arrested for obstruction to clear the roof. Englander brings Joey and Angie, threatening to kill Joey unless Nick gives him the diamond. Nick turns it over, and Englander leaves. Mercer escapes custody in an elevator and rushes back to the roof. Marcus demands Nick jump off the roof. Ackerman arrives, shoots Marcus, and is shot in return. Ackerman apologizes to Nick and claims he did not know Englander would frame him. Marcus' bulletproof vest saves him, but as he prepares to kill Nick, Mercer arrives and shoots him. Nick jumps from the roof onto an airbag set up earlier by the police, catches up to Englander, and pulls the diamond from Englander's jacket, publicly proving his innocence; Englander is then arrested for insurance fraud.

Nick is cleared of all charges and released from custody. He meets Joey, Angie, and Mercer at a bar owned by Nick's father, Frank Cassidy, who had faked his death and pretended to be the hotel concierge. Mercer asks Nick to "explain everything" to her as Joey proposes to Angie with a diamond ring, presumably stolen from Englander's vault. She accepts, and they all celebrate together.

== Cast ==
- Sam Worthington as Nick Cassidy
- Elizabeth Banks as Lydia Mercer
- Jamie Bell as Joseph "Joey" Cassidy
- Anthony Mackie as Mike Ackerman
- Edward Burns as Jack Dougherty
- Titus Welliver as Dante Marcus
- Genesis Rodriguez as Angela Maria "Angie" Lopez
- Kyra Sedgwick as Suzie Morales
- Ed Harris as David Englander
- William Sadler as the hotel valet, revealed at the end to be Frank Cassidy, the Cassidy boys' father

== Development ==
On September 3, 2010, it was confirmed that Jamie Bell had joined the cast. Filming began on October 30 in New York City. On November 1, Ed Harris and Titus Welliver were confirmed to have joined the cast.

The first image from the set was revealed on November 2, 2010. The first teaser poster for the film was released on November 5, 2010. The first trailer was released by Summit Entertainment on September 22, 2011. The film was distributed by Summit Entertainment and E1 Entertainment (UK).

During development, a large, on-rails prop was used to make the Roosevelt hotel seem taller, so that the hotel would remain consistent with the shots filmed in-studio instead of on the hotel itself. During the scenes where Nick is running along the sides of the hotel, extra floors were added during post-production to save the need for a second attachment. In post-production, crowds were edited in from other shots so that the crowds would appear consistent throughout the film. The lead actor, Sam Worthington, admitted during interviews that he had a fear of heights that he had to tackle during shooting.

== Release ==
=== Box office ===
Man on a Ledge grossed US$18.6 million in the United States and Canada, and $29.0 million in other territories, for a worldwide total of $47.6 million, against a production budget of $42 million. Released January 27, 2012, it opened at No. 5 and spent its first two weeks in the Top 10 at the domestic box office.

=== Critical response ===
On the review aggregator website Rotten Tomatoes, 31% of 160 critics' reviews are positive, with an average rating of 4.8/10. The website's consensus reads: "Uninspired acting and preposterous plotlines defuse Man on a Ledge's mildly intriguing premise." Metacritic, which uses a weighted average, assigned the film a score of 40 out of 100, based on 32 critics, indicating "mixed or average" reviews.

Roger Ebert of the Chicago Sun-Times said, "The movie cuts back and forth between two preposterous plot lines and uses the man on the ledge as a device to pump up the tension." According to Ebert, too much depends on Nick securing a leave from prison, escaping from two armed guards, reaching Manhattan, checking into the correct hotel room on the correct floor and not falling off prematurely. Anna Smith felt that the film "embrace[d] its own lunacy readily enough", but criticized the "ridiculous ending". Similarly, The New Zealand Herald considered the film "a missed opportunity" that doesn't live up to its potential", pointing at the "limited" location Sam Worthington had to work with, praising how he still appeared "suitably terrified".

=== Home media ===
The DVD and Blu-ray Disc was released in the United States on May 29, 2012, after being absorbed by Lionsgate.

The disc contains a 20-minute featurette, which shows behind-the-scenes footage, with an explanation of how various shots or effects were achieved. For instance, producer Lorenzo explains how shots of the crowd were composited onto a green chroma keying carpet, laid down underneath the fake ledge used for shots recorded in-studio. A version of the film with voiceover is included for the visually impaired.

The Steelbook version of the film does not have menus, so is missing the special features present in the DVD and Blu-ray releases.

The 4K UHD Blu-ray was released in April 2019.

== Music ==
The soundtrack to Man on a Ledge was released on January 27, 2012. James Southall commented that while "there is occasionally some reasonably tense action music", he found most of the score "very tired-sounding". Jørn Tillnes of Soundtrackgeek.com described it as "succeed[ing] in almost every way", but that he "would prefer more variation", as he found that "as a complete listening experience, you get bored with it".

== See also ==
- Fourteen Hours (1951)
