= Haley Joel Osment =

American actor (born 1988)

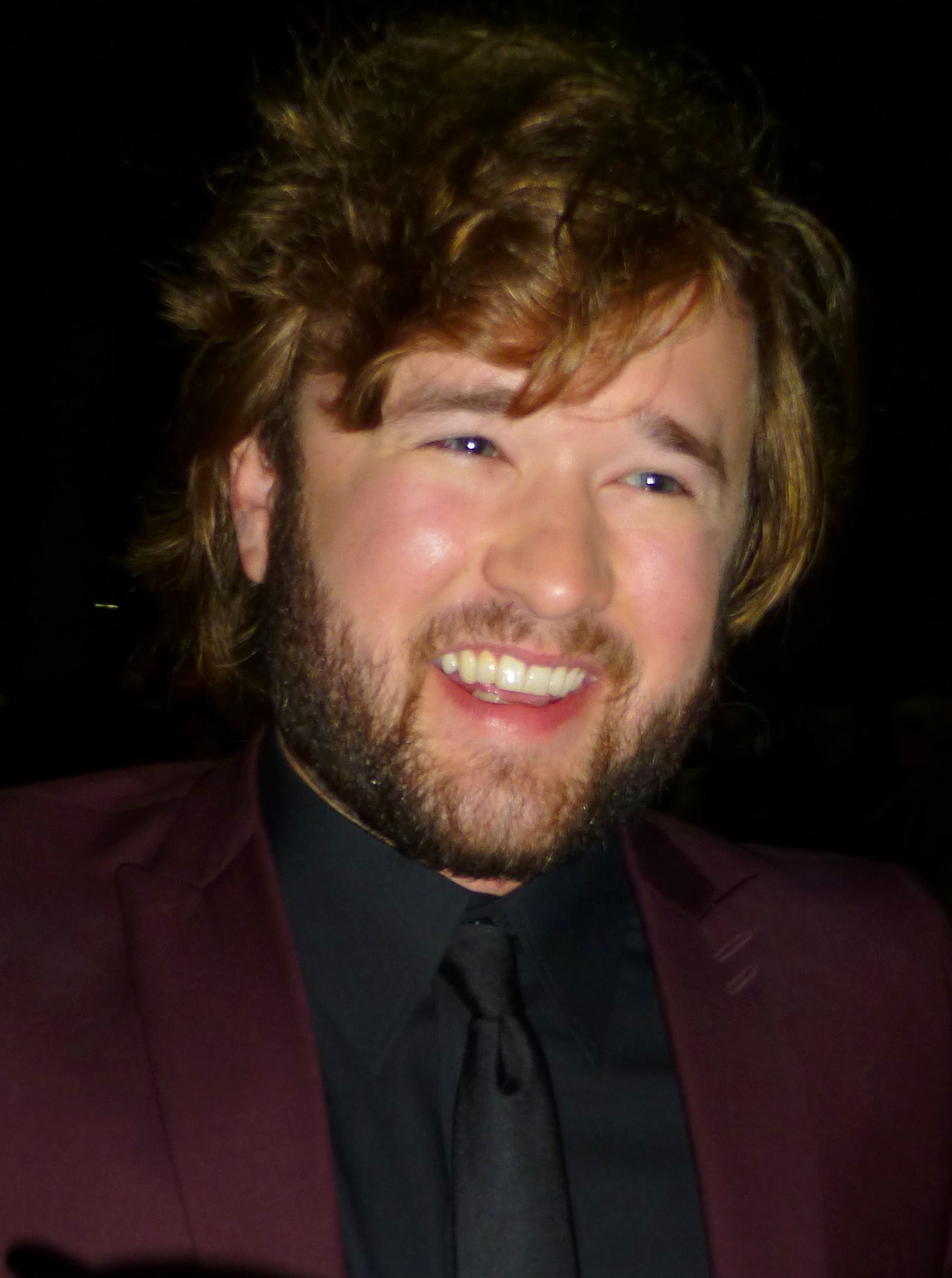
- Osment in 2014
- Born: April 10, 1988 (age 38); Los Angeles, California, U.S.
- Education: New York University (BFA)
- Occupation: Actor
- Years active: 1992–present
- Relatives: Emily Osment (sister)

Haley Joel Osment (born April 10, 1988) is an American actor. Beginning his career as a child actor, Osment's role in the comedy-drama film Forrest Gump (1994) won him a Young Artist Award. His breakthrough came with the psychological thriller film The Sixth Sense (1999), for which he won a Saturn Award and was nominated for an Academy Award, a Golden Globe Award, and a Screen Actors Guild Award. Osment achieved further success with the drama film Pay It Forward (2000), the science fiction film A.I. Artificial Intelligence (2001), which won him a second Saturn Award, the comedy film Secondhand Lions (2003), which won him a Critics Choice Award, and the animated film The Jungle Book 2 (2003).

Osment is known as the voice of Sora and Vanitas in the Kingdom Hearts series. He made his Broadway debut in a short-lived revival of David Mamet's play American Buffalo (2008). Osment starred in independent film Montana Amazon (2012), also serving as executive producer. His further on-screen work includes the body horror film Tusk (2014), the comedy films Sex Ed (2014), Entourage (2015), Izzy Gets the F*ck Across Town (2017), and Clara's Ghost (2018), and the drama films Almost Friends (2016), Extremely Wicked, Shockingly Evil and Vile (2019), and Somebody I Used to Know (2023). In animation, Osment has voiced Kash D. Langford on the Netflix series Jurassic World Camp Cretaceous (2021), Leonard "Buzzsaw" Burne on the DreamWorks Animation Television series DreamWorks Dragons: The Nine Realms (2021–2023), Casey Jones in the animated film Rise of the Teenage Mutant Ninja Turtles: The Movie (2022), and Collector in the animated film LEGO Marvel Avengers: Code Red (2023).

== Early life ==
Haley Joel Osment was born on April 10, 1988 in Los Angeles, California. He is the son of Theresa (née Seifert), a teacher, and Michael Eugene Osment, a theater and film actor, both natives of Birmingham, Alabama. Osment was raised Catholic. He has a younger sister, Emily, who is also an actress. Osment's parents have described his childhood as a "good old-fashioned Southern upbringing". His father said that when Osment was learning to speak, he deliberately avoided using baby talk when communicating with his son. As a child, Osment wrestled and played basketball, football, and golf.

Osment was a student at Flintridge Preparatory School in La Cañada Flintridge, California. He graduated from New York University's Tisch School of the Arts in 2011.

== Career ==
=== Child actor ===
While visiting a store at age four, Osment signed up with a talent scout. After being called back for an audition, he was asked to describe the biggest thing he had ever seen; Osment's description of an IMAX theater screen helped win him a part in a Pizza Hut TV commercial. The commercial launched Osment's career, and later that year he starred in the ABC TV sitcom Thunder Alley, his first role in a television series. Osment's first feature film role was as Forrest Gump's son in the 1994 film Forrest Gump, also having a minor role in another 1994 film, Mixed Nuts. Throughout the rest of the 1990s, Osment played regular or recurring roles in various television series, including The Jeff Foxworthy Show, and replaced Dyllan Christopher as Murphy's son, Avery in the final season of Murphy Brown.

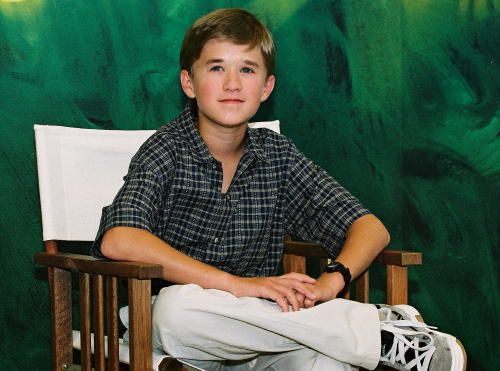
Osment in 2001

Osment also made several guest appearances on shows, including The Larry Sanders Show, Walker, Texas Ranger, Touched by an Angel, Chicago Hope, The Pretender, and Ally McBeal. He appeared in the 1996 film Bogus, alongside Whoopi Goldberg and Gérard Depardieu, and the 1998 television film The Lake, and starred alongside future The Sixth Sense co-star Trevor Morgan in I'll Remember April (1999).

Osment first achieved stardom in 1999, when he co-starred with Bruce Willis in The Sixth Sense. For his portrayal of Cole Sear, a psychic child, Osment won the Saturn Award for Best Performance by a Younger Actor. He was also nominated for the Academy Award for Best Supporting Actor, becoming the second-youngest performer ever to receive an Academy nomination for a supporting role, but lost the final Oscar vote to Michael Caine, with whom Osment later worked, appearing together in Secondhand Lions. Sear's line "I see dead people," became a popular catchphrase and is often parodied in media, being #44 on the American Film Institute's list of 100 Movie Quotes. Osment made minor appearances on the animated series Family Guy in 2000 and 2001.

In 2000, Osment had a leading role as Trevor McKinney in Pay It Forward; the following year, he appeared in Steven Spielberg's A.I. Artificial Intelligence, cementing his stature as one of the leading young actors in Hollywood. This role earned him his second Saturn Award for Best Younger Actor. In reviewing the film, critic Roger Ebert stated that "Osment, who is onscreen in almost every scene, is one of the best actors now working". In 2001, Osment starred as Romek in the Polish film Edges of the Lord. Between 2002 and 2003, Osment had voice roles in the Walt Disney Pictures films The Country Bears, The Hunchback of Notre Dame II, and The Jungle Book 2, with Jake Thomas auditioning for the role of Mowgli prior to Osment's casting. He returned to live action with the 2003 film Secondhand Lions.

In 2002, Osment starred in Kingdom Hearts, the first installment of the video game series Kingdom Hearts, providing the voice of protagonist Sora and later Vanitas. In 2003, Osment voiced Takeshi Jin in the English version of the Immortal Grand Prix anime television series.

=== Teenaged and adult roles ===
Osment played a high school journalist opposite Ryan Merriman and Danielle Panabaker in Home of the Giants (2007).

Osment made his Broadway debut at the Belasco Theatre in 2008, playing the role of Bobby in a revival of David Mamet's American Buffalo. Osment co-starred with John Leguizamo and Cedric the Entertainer and was described as "all grown up". The show opened to mixed reviews, and a provisional statement was made on November 20, 2008, that it would close after the first week.

Osment subsequently worked on Montana Amazon as both an actor and executive producer. The film starred Olympia Dukakis and debuted at the Orlando and Big Apple Film Festivals in November 2010, winning Best Feature Film at the latter. He appeared in an adult role in Sassy Pants (2012).

In 2013, Osment appeared in Amazon's Alpha House, and co-starred in the Will Ferrell and Adam McKay-produced comedy melodrama miniseries The Spoils of Babylon, and The Spoils Before Dying, for IFC. Osment also had roles in the first two films of Kevin Smith's True North trilogy, as well as Teddy Craft in Tusk, and as a fictionalized version of Canadian journalist Adrien Arcand in Yoga Hosers.

In 2015, Osment appeared in Entourage, the film adaptation of the television series. The following year, he appeared in the drama film Almost Friends.

In 2017, Osment held a recurring role as VR expert and tech financier Keenan Feldspar in season 4 of HBO's Silicon Valley. That same year, Osment made an appearance on BBC America's Top Gear America as one of the guests in the fourth episode of season 1. He then appeared in the comedy films Izzy Gets the F*ck Across Town (2017), and Clara's Ghost (2018).

In 2019, Osment had a supporting role in the Netflix film Extremely Wicked, Shockingly Evil and Vile, starring alongside Lily Collins as Liz, who follows the prosecution of Ted Bundy, played by Zac Efron. In 2023, Osment was in the Amazon Prime film Somebody I Used to Know. He also had roles in two series that have Seth Rogen and Evan Goldberg as executive producers: Osment plays Mesmer in the Amazon series The Boys, and Dr. Stu Camillo in the Hulu series Future Man.

Osment's voice roles include Kash D. Langford on the Netflix series Jurassic World Camp Cretaceous (2021), Leonard "Buzzsaw" Burne on the DreamWorks Animation Television series DreamWorks Dragons: The Nine Realms (2021–2023), Casey Jones in the animated film Rise of the Teenage Mutant Ninja Turtles: The Movie (2022), and Collector in the animated film LEGO Marvel Avengers: Code Red (2023).

== Personal life ==
Osment plays the guitar and piano. He is an avid golfer who began playing at the age of seven, playing for the U.S. team in the All-Star Cup 2005 under team leader Mark O'Meara, and has participated in the annual Michael Douglas & Friends Celebrity Golf Tournament.

In 2006, Osment suffered a broken rib and fractured shoulder blade in an auto accident. He pleaded no contest to driving under the influence of alcohol and misdemeanor drug possession and was sentenced to three years' probation, 60 hours in an alcohol rehabilitation and education program, a fine of $1,500, and attendance at Alcoholics Anonymous.

In 2007, Osment began attending New York University. He graduated four years later.

In 2025, Osment's Altadena home was destroyed during the Eaton Fire, part of the January 2025 Southern California wildfires.

In April 2025, Osment was arrested at a ski resort in Mammoth Lakes, California, for public intoxication and possession of a controlled substance, later confirmed to be cocaine. While under arrest, he was captured on police body cameras using slurs against Jews toward his arresting officer, for which he later apologized. Osment was released after booking. In June 2025, he appeared in court for these acts and was sentenced to attend three Alcoholics Anonymous meetings a week for six months, as well as have twice-weekly sessions with his therapist during the same period.

== Filmography ==
=== Film ===
Year	Title	Role	Notes
1994	Forrest Gump	Forrest Gump Jr.	
1994	Mixed Nuts	Little Boy	
1995	For Better or Worse	Danny	
1996	Bogus	Albert Franklin	
1997	Beauty and the Beast: The Enchanted Christmas	Chip (voice)	Direct-to-video
1999	The Sixth Sense	Cole Sear	
1999	I'll Remember April	Peewee Clayton	
2000	Pay It Forward	Trevor McKinney	
2000	Spot the Dog	Spot the Dog (voice)	Direct-to-video
2001	A.I. Artificial Intelligence	David	
2001	Edges of the Lord	Romek	
2002	The Hunchback of Notre Dame II	Zephyr (voice)	Direct-to-video
2002	The Country Bears	Beary Barrington (voice)	
2003	Secondhand Lions	Walter Caldwell	
2003	The Jungle Book 2	Mowgli (voice)	
2007	Home of the Giants	Robert "Gar" Gartland	
2010	Montana Amazon	Womple Dunderhead	Also executive producer
2012	Sassy Pants	Chip Hardy	
2013	I'll Follow You Down	Erol	Released as Continuum outside North America
2014	Tusk	Teddy Craft	
2014	Sex Ed	Ed Cole	
2015	Wrestling Isn't Wrestling	Theater Audience Member	Short film
2015	The World Made Straight	Shank	
2015	Entourage	Travis McCredle	
2015	Me Him Her	Haley	
2016	Yoga Hosers	Adrien Arcand	
2016	Almost Friends	Ben	
2017	Izzy Gets the F*ck Across Town	Walt	
2017	Sleepwalker	Warren	
2017	CarGo	Danny (voice)	
2018	Clara's Ghost	Joe	
2019	Extremely Wicked, Shockingly Evil and Vile	Jerry Thompson	
2019	The Devil Has a Name	Alex Gardner	
2020	Bad Therapy	Reed	
2020	Death of a Telemarketer	Jim/Dean	
2020	Have a Good Trip: Adventures in Psychedelics	Gabe	
2022	Rise of the Teenage Mutant Ninja Turtles: The Movie	Casey Jones, Foot Soldiers (voice)	
2023	Somebody I Used to Know	Jeremy	
2023	Lego Marvel Avengers: Code Red	Collector (voice)	Disney+ special
2024	Drugstore June	Davey	
2024	Blink Twice	Tom	
2025	Happy Gilmore 2	Billy Jenkins	

=== Television ===
Year	Title	Role	Notes
1994	The Larry Sanders Show	Little Boy	Episode: "The Fourteenth Floor"
1994	Lies of the Heart: The Story of Laurie Kellogg	Kyle	Television film
1994–1995	Thunder Alley	Harry Turner	Starring role
1995–1997	The Jeff Foxworthy Show	Matt Foxworthy	Starring role
1997	Walker, Texas Ranger	Lucas Simms	2 episodes
1997	Last Stand at Saber River	Davis Cable	Television film
1997–1998	Murphy Brown	Avery Brown #2	6 episodes
1998	Chicago Hope	Nathan Cacaci	Episode: "Memento Mori"
1998	Touched by an Angel	John Henry	Episode: "Flights of Angels"
1998	The Pretender	Davey Simpkins	2 episodes
1998	The Lake	Dylan Hydecker	Television film
1998	The Ransom of Red Chief	Andy Dorset	Television film
1998	Cab to Canada	Bobby	Television film
1999	Ally McBeal	Eric Stall	Episode: "Angels and Blimps"
1999	Hey Arnold!	Curly Gammelthorpe (voice)	Episode: "Deconstructing Arnold"
2000	Buzz Lightyear of Star Command	Myka (voice)	Episode: "Lone Wolf"
2000–2026	Family Guy	Various characters (voice)	6 episodes
2005–2006	Immortal Grand Prix	Takeshi Jin (voice)	English dub
2013–2014	Alpha House	Shelby Mellman	12 episodes
2013, 2022	American Dad!	Stan's Informant, Clubber (voice)	3 episodes
2014	The Spoils of Babylon	Winston Morehouse	3 episodes
2015	The Spoils Before Dying	Alistair St. Barnaby-Bixby-Jones	5 episodes
2015	Drunk History	Kid Blink	Episode: "Journalism"
2015–2016	Comedy Bang! Bang!	Slow Joey	10 episodes
2016	The Eric Andre Show	Guest	Episode: "Dennis Rodman; Haley Joel Osment"
2017	Oasis	Sy	Amazon Video pilot episode
2017	Silicon Valley	Keenan Feldspar	3 episodes
2017	Top Gear America	Himself	Episode: "Drive Your Life"
2017–2019	Teachers	Damien	4 episodes
2017–2019	Future Man	Dr. Stu Camillo	14 episodes
2018	Swedish Dicks	Dave	Episode: "Floyd Cal Who"
2018	The X-Files	Davey James / Young John James	Episode: "Kitten"
2018	Rob Riggle's Ski Master Academy	Gaston Lebone	Episode: "R.I.G.G.L.E. Day"
2019	The Boys	Mesmer	2 episodes
2019–2021	The Kominsky Method	Robby	7 episodes
2020	Robot Chicken	Kevin Jonas, Tim Murphy (voice)	Episode: "Petless M in: Cars Are Couches On The Road"
2020	Star Trek: Lower Decks	O'Connor (voice)	Episode: "Moist Vessel"
2020	The George Lucas Talk Show	Himself	Episode: "Yoda Hosers"
2020–2023	What We Do In the Shadows	Topher Delmonico	2 episodes
2021	Goliath	Dylan Zax	Recurring role
2021	Awkwafina Is Nora from Queens	Amos	Episode: "Home"
2021–2022	Jurassic World Camp Cretaceous	Kash D. Langford (voice)	Seasons 4–5
2021–2022	Dogs in Space	Garbage (voice)	Main cast
2022	We Baby Bears	Teddi, Bear 3 (voice)	Episode: "Teddi Bear"
2022	Dead End: Paranormal Park	Danny (voice)	Episode: "Going Up"
2022	The Mysterious Benedict Society	One Two	Episode: "A Two-Way Street"
2022–2023	DreamWorks Dragons: The Nine Realms	Buzzsaw (voice)	Seasons 2–6
2023–2025	Star Wars: Young Jedi Adventures	Raxlo (voice)	5 episodes
2024	Batman: Caped Crusader	Anton Night (voice)	Episode: "Nocturne"
2024	Jimmy Kimmel Live!	JD Vance	Guest role
2024	Megamind Rules!	Dan Donner / Hu-Mouse (voice)	5 episodes
2025	Poker Face	Kirby Kowalczyk	2 episodes
2025	Wednesday	Chet (serial killer)	Season 2; guest role
2025	It's Florida, Man	Travis	Episode: "Bigfoot"
2025–2026	Spidey and His Amazing Friends	Hydro-Man (voice)	Recurring role
2026	The Terrors of Jordan Mendoza	Brady the Leprechaun	Episode: "Found a Leprechaun"

=== Video games ===
Year	Title	Voice role	Notes	Source
2002	Kingdom Hearts	Sora		
2006	Kingdom Hearts II	Sora		
2008	Kingdom Hearts Re:Chain of Memories	Sora		
2009	Kingdom Hearts 358/2 Days	Sora		
2010	Kingdom Hearts Birth by Sleep	Sora, Vanitas		
2011	Kingdom Hearts Re:coded	Sora		
2012	Kingdom Hearts 3D: Dream Drop Distance	Sora, Vanitas		
2013	Kingdom Hearts HD 1.5 Remix	Sora	Archive audio	
2014	Kingdom Hearts HD 2.5 Remix	Sora, Vanitas	Archive audio for Vanitas	
2017	Kingdom Hearts HD 2.8 Final Chapter Prologue	Sora, Vanitas	Archive audio for Vanitas	
2018	NBA 2K19	Zack Coleman	Also facial capture	
2019	Kingdom Hearts III	Sora, Vanitas	Also in Re:Mind (2020) DLC	
2020	Kingdom Hearts: Melody of Memory	Sora	Archive audio	
2021	Super Smash Bros. Ultimate	Sora	As part of DLC Challenger Pack #11; Archive audio	
2026	Kingdom Hearts Collection [I~III]	Sora	Archive audio	
2027	Kingdom Hearts IV	Sora		

=== Theater ===
Year	Title	Role	Theater	Source
2008	American Buffalo	Bobby	Belasco Theatre	
2024	Midnight Coleslaw's Tales from Beyond the Closet!!!	Hun	The Tank	

== Awards ==
Year	Award	Category	Nominated work	Result	Ref.
1994	Young Artist Award	Best Performance by an Actor Under Ten in a Motion Picture	Forrest Gump	Won	
1996	Young Artist Award	Best Performance in a Feature Film – Actor Age Ten or Under	Bogus	Nominated	
1996	Young Artist Award	Best performance in a television comedy or drama by a supporting young actor age ten or under	The Jeff Foxworthy Show	Nominated	
1997	Young Artist Award	Best performance in a television comedy or drama by a supporting young actor age ten or under	The Jeff Foxworthy Show	Nominated	
1997	YoungStar Award	Best performance by a young actor in a made–for–television movie	Last Stand at Saber River	Nominated	
1998	Young Artist Award	Best performance in a television comedy series by a young actor age ten or under	Murphy Brown	Nominated	
1998	Young Artist Award	Best performance in a television drama series by a guest starring young actor	Walker, Texas Ranger	Nominated	
1999	YoungStar Award	Best performance by a young actor in a miniseries or made–for–television movie	Cab to Canada	Nominated	
1999	Academy Award	Best Supporting Actor	The Sixth Sense	Nominated	
1999	Blockbuster Entertainment Award	Favorite Actor – Newcomer (Internet Only)	The Sixth Sense	Won	
1999	Boston Society of Film Critics	Best Supporting Actor	The Sixth Sense	Nominated	
1999	Chicago Film Critics Association	Best Supporting Actor	The Sixth Sense	Nominated	
1999	Chicago Film Critics Association	Most Promising Actor	The Sixth Sense	Nominated	
1999	Critics Choice Association	Best Young Performer	The Sixth Sense	Won	
1999	Dallas–Fort Worth Film Critics Association	Best Supporting Actor	The Sixth Sense	Won	
1999	Florida Film Critics Circle	Best Supporting Actor	The Sixth Sense	Won	
1999	Golden Globe Awards	Best Supporting Actor – Motion Picture	The Sixth Sense	Nominated	
1999	Kansas City Film Critics Circle	Best Supporting Actor	The Sixth Sense	Won	
1999	Las Vegas Film Critics Society	Best Supporting Actor	The Sixth Sense	Won	
1999	Las Vegas Film Critics Society	Youth in Film	The Sixth Sense	Won	
1999	Las Vegas Film Critics Society	Most Promising Actor	The Sixth Sense	Won	
1999	MTV Movie Awards	Best Male Breakthrough Performance	The Sixth Sense	Won	
1999	MTV Movie Awards	Best On-Screen Duo (With Bruce Willis)	The Sixth Sense	Nominated	
1999	National Society of Film Critics	Best Supporting Actor	The Sixth Sense	Nominated	
1999	Online Film Critics Society	Best Supporting Actor	The Sixth Sense	Won	
1999	Online Film Critics Society	Best Debut	The Sixth Sense	Nominated	
1999	Satellite Award	Best Performance by a Younger Actor	The Sixth Sense	Won	
1999	Screen Actors Guild	Outstanding Performance by a Male Actor in a Supporting Role	The Sixth Sense	Nominated	
1999	Southeastern Film Critics Association	Best Supporting Actor	The Sixth Sense	Won	
1999	Teen Choice Awards	Choice Breakout Performance	The Sixth Sense	Won	
1999	Young Artist Award	Leading Young Actor	The Sixth Sense	Won	
1999	YoungStar Award	Best Young Actor Performance in a Motion Picture Drama	The Sixth Sense	Won	
2000	Blockbuster Entertainment Award	Favorite Supporting Actor – Drama/Romance	Pay It Forward	Won	
2000	Young Artist Award	Best Performance in a Feature Film – Leading Young Actor	Pay It Forward	Nominated	
2001	Broadcast Film Critics Association	Best Young Performer	A.I. Artificial Intelligence	Nominated	
2001	Empire Awards	Best Actor	A.I. Artificial Intelligence	Nominated	
2001	Phoenix Film Critics Society	Best Youth Performance	A.I. Artificial Intelligence	Nominated	
2001	Saturn Award	Best Performance by a Younger Actor	A.I. Artificial Intelligence	Won	
2001	Young Artist Award	Best Performance in a Feature Film – Leading Young Actor	A.I. Artificial Intelligence	Nominated	
2001	ShoWest	Supporting actor of the year	—N/a	Won	
2002	Young Artist Award	Best Performance in a Voice-Over Role	The Hunchback of Notre Dame II	Nominated	
2003	Critics Choice Award	Best Young Actor in Drama	Secondhand Lions	Won	
2003	Young Artist Award	Best Performance in a Feature Film – Leading Young Actor	Secondhand Lions	Nominated	
2003	World Soundtrack Awards	Best Original Song Written for a Film (Shared with Paul Grabowsky, Lorraine Feather, Mae Whitman, and Connor Funk)	The Jungle Book 2	Nominated	
2003	Young Artist Award	Best Performance in a Voice-Over Role – Young Actor	The Jungle Book 2	Nominated	
2022	Screen Actors Guild	Outstanding Performance by an Ensemble in a Comedy Series	The Kominsky Method	Nominated	
