= Chris Parkinson (poet) =

British writer, poet and prankster

Chris Parkinson is a writer, poet and prankster from Brighton, UK. He has been writing and performing poetry since 2004.

In 2007 he was co-founder of the world's first Poetry Brothel, an interactive poetry event which won several awards and inspired subsequent poetry brothels in New York, Leicester, Barcelona and Chicago. He has released three collections of poetry.

In 2013 he placed an advert on the website Gumtree about a man wanting a lodger to dress up as a walrus, which went on to inspire the Kevin Smith film Tusk, and was flown out to America to become associate producer on the film.

He reported a vortex to another dimension appearing on a residential street in Brighton which featured on Have I Got News For You.

His 2014 Brighton Fringe event "Moonshine" won Best Literature in the Brighton Fringe Awards.
