= Harley Morenstein =

Canadian Internet personality (born 1985)

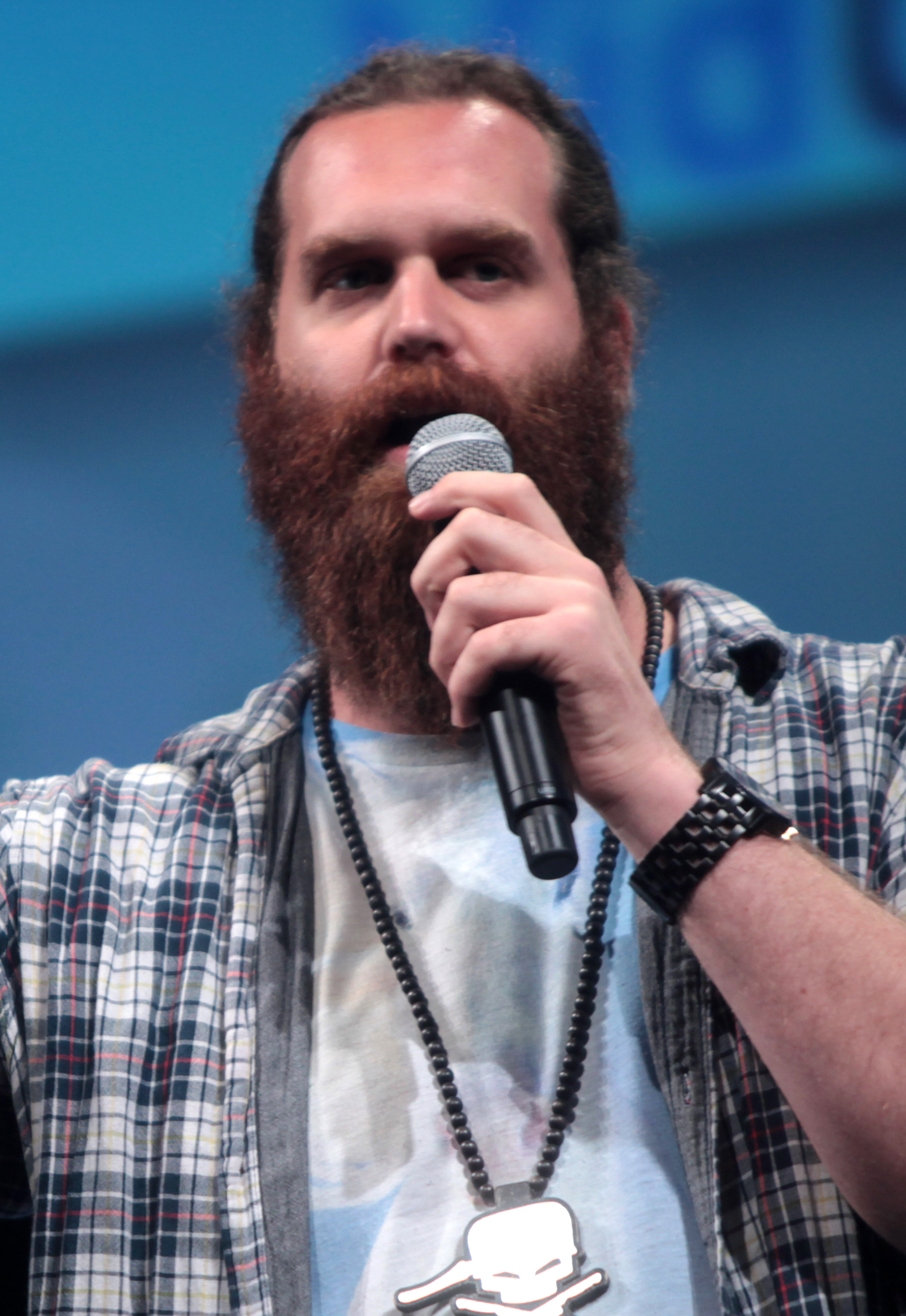
- Morenstein speaking at the 2014 VidCon
- Born: July 20, 1985 (age 41); Montreal, Quebec, Canada
- Education: Dawson College; McGill University (BEd, 2009)
- Occupations: YouTube personality; Actor

YouTube information
- Channel: Harley Morenstein
- Years active: 2010–present
- Genre: Cooking
- Subscribers: 272 thousand
- Views: 31.9 million
- Last updated: June 10, 2026

Harley Morenstein (born July 20, 1985) is a Canadian YouTuber. He co-created, produces, and hosts the web show Epic Meal Time and its FYI television spin-off series, Epic Meal Empire. He is one of the two remaining original members of the show along with Ameer Atari. He was also a member of the H3 Podcast crew until 2026.

== Early and personal life ==
Morenstein was born to English-speaking Jewish-Canadian parents in Montreal, Quebec. He attended Dawson College. He was a substitute teacher for a number of years at Lakeside Academy in Lachine, teaching history. Morenstein currently resides in Montreal and splits his time between Montreal and Los Angeles, California.

== Internet career ==
=== EpicMealTime ===
In 2010 he co-created Epic Meal Time with Sterling Toth. The channel has over 6 million subscribers, and over 300 installments, 2 spin-offs, and has had guest stars such as Seth Rogen, Smosh, Tony Hawk, Arnold Schwarzenegger, and Kevin Smith, who directed the movie Tusk, in which Morenstein had a cameo appearance. He produces the show with his brother, Darren Morenstein, under the company name Nexttime Productions. He starred in the TV adaptation of the show called Epic Meal Empire on FYI, which ran for two seasons.

=== Vlogging career ===
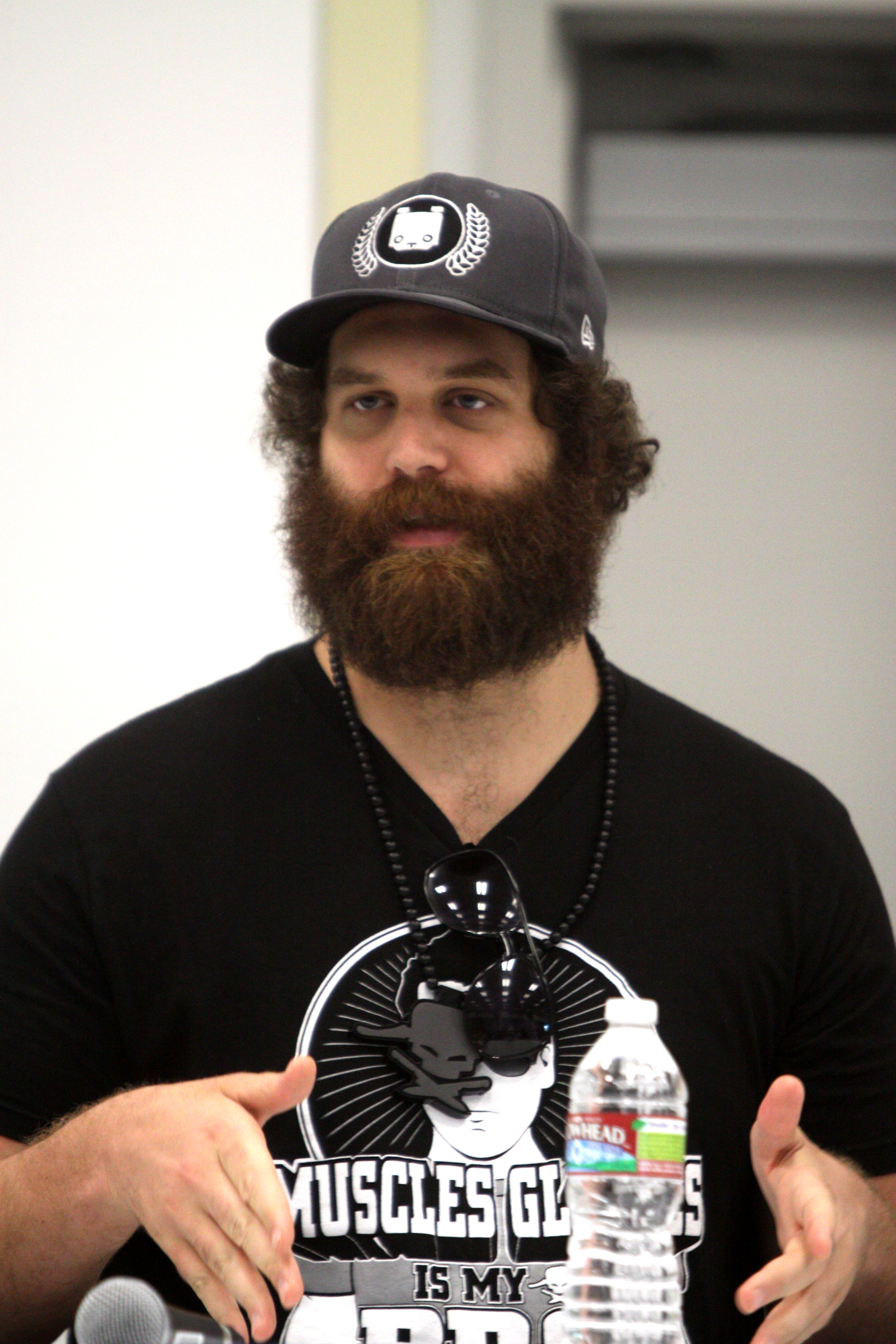
Morenstein at VidCon in 2012

Morenstein became famous on Vine in 2013. Since then he has been prevalent on Vine, and in 2015 after sporadically vlogging on YouTube since 2014, he began vlogging full-time, with videos featuring his girlfriend (though they have since broken up amicably as of 2019), dog, and the other members of EpicMealTime. He has amassed nearly 300,000 subscribers on his vlog channel.

=== h3h3Productions ===
In January 2026, Ethan Klein from h3h3Productions announced Morenstein as a host of the H3 After Dark podcast, a talk show that directly followed live broadcasts of Klein’s H3 Podcast. Morenstein hosted the show with Internet personality Girl With A Microphone.

On November 16, Morenstein appeared on a livestream to discuss Ethan's affair. The live stream caught the attention of Hila, who announced via Instagram that she would not continue the professional relationship. Hila chose to honor Morenstein's contract with h3h3Productions until the end of November, at which point it will be terminated.

== Acting career ==
Morenstein featured in one of Destorm's songs called "Epic wRap", which was uploaded on YouTube December 18, 2011. He has also been featured in fellow YouTube celebrity Freddie Wong's video web series Video Game High School, and appeared with Shane Dawson in a commercial for Just Dance 4.

After Kevin Smith appeared on an episode of the show, and an episode of the TV show, he offered Morenstein a cameo role in his movie Tusk, which was followed by a cameo in his Yoga Hosers. He also starred in Smith's portion of the anthology movie Holidays. He will be one of the lead roles in Smith's denouement to the Canadian horror trilogy, Moose Jaws.

In 2015, Morenstein was cast in the zombie film Dead Rising: Watchtower. He had a guest role on an episode of Nickelodeon's Game Shakers, in his first television role. In 2012, Morenstein made a cameo at the end of Rhett and Link's "Rub Some Bacon On It" music video, and in the duo's 2015 sketch "The Overly Complicated Coffee Order".

He hosted the October 2017 competition Halloween Wars: Hayride of Horror on Food Network.

== Boxing record ==
2 fights	1 win	1 loss
By knockout	1	1

No.	Result	Record	Opponent	Type	Round, time	Date	Location	Notes
2	Loss	1–1	John Hennigan	TKO	3 (5)	April 15, 2023	Amalie Arena, Tampa, Florida, U.S.	Exhibition bout
1	Win	1–0	Arin Hanson	TKO	2 (5)	May 14, 2022	Yuengling Center, Tampa, Florida, U.S.	Exhibition bout

== Filmography ==
=== Film ===
Year	Title	Role	Notes
2012	Sync	Ghost	
2013	M Is for Misotheism	Bum	Short film
2014	HOBOrculosis	Epic Hobo	Short film
2014	Tusk	Border Agent	
2015	Dead Rising: Watchtower	Pyro	
2015	Smosh: The Movie	Mailman	
2016	Yoga Hosers	Toilet Paper Man	
2016	Holidays	Ian	

=== Television ===
Year	Title	Role	Notes
2011	The Tonight Show with Jay Leno	Himself	with Epic Meal Time cast
2013	AXS Live	Himself	
2013	The High Fructose Adventures of Annoying Orange	Cabbage (voice)	Episode: "Everybody Loves Cabbage"
2014	Epic Meal Empire	Himself	12 episodes Also executive producer
2014	@midnight	Himself	Contestant, with Hannah Hart and Grace Helbig
2016	Game Shakers	Big Vicious	One episode, guest role
2017	Halloween Wars Hayride of Horror	Host	
2019	Corner Gas Animated	Himself (voice)	Episode: "Tag You're I.T."

=== Web series ===
Year	Title	Role	Notes
2010–2024	Epic Meal Time	Himself	Also creator, producer, and writer
2013	TableTop	Himself	
2012–2014	Video Game High School	Dean Ernie Calhoun	
2026	H3 After Dark	Himself	
