= Jennifer Schwalbach Smith =

American actress

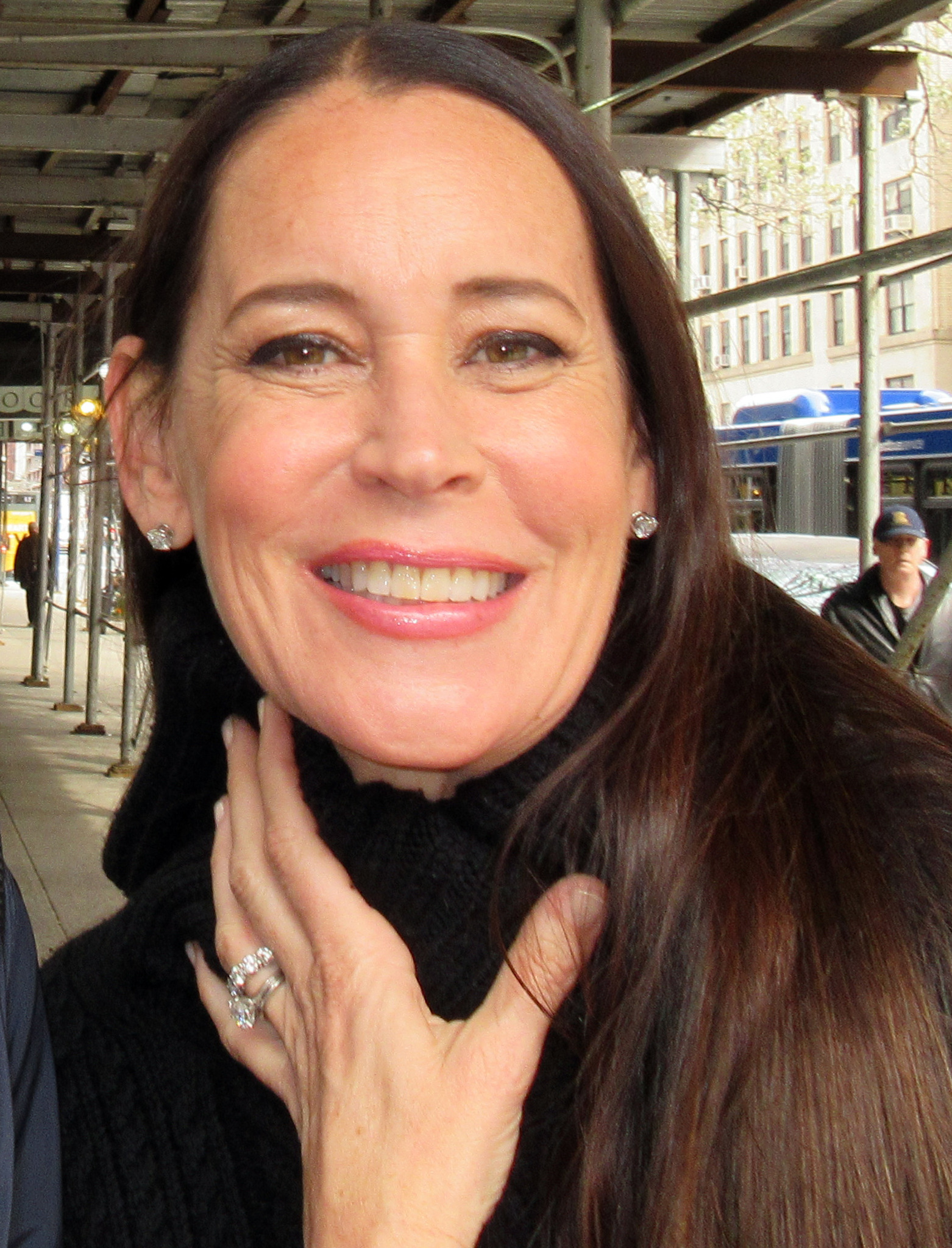
- Smith in 2018
- Born: Jennifer Mary Schwalbach; April 7, 1971 (age 55); Newark, New Jersey, U.S.
- Occupations: Actress; podcaster; reporter
- Years active: 1990s–present
- Spouse: Kevin Smith (m. 1999)
- Children: Harley Quinn Smith

Jennifer Mary Schwalbach Smith (sometimes credited as Jennifer Schwalbach; born April 7, 1971) is an American actress, podcaster, and former reporter for USA Today.

== Career ==
While a USA Today reporter, Schwalbach met film director Kevin Smith while interviewing him for an assignment. She got a job briefly at MTV and resigned after becoming pregnant with their daughter in 1998.

According to his commentary for the DVD release of the 2001 film Jay and Silent Bob Strike Back, Smith was looking for someone to play Missy, one of the female diamond robbers. Schwalbach asked to play the role and he decided to give her a chance. Their daughter, Harley, also appeared at the beginning of the film as baby Silent Bob.

Schwalbach went on to have supporting roles in other Smith-related productions such as Jersey Girl (in which Harley also appeared), and an episode of the Canadian TV series Degrassi: The Next Generation in which Smith appeared in the episode "Goin' Down the Road: Part 1". She also played a prostitute in the 2002 film Now You Know.

In January 2004, Schwalbach Smith appeared nude, with a Superman look-alike, for Playboy Magazine's 50th Anniversary Issue, in a photograph taken by her husband.

Her directorial credit is as co-director with Malcolm Ingram for Oh, What a Lovely Tea Party, an extensive 3+ hour documentary on the making of Jay and Silent Bob Strike Back. The film was shown at Vulgarthon 2005 in Los Angeles, a private film festival hosted by Kevin Smith, and was shown again at Vulgarthon 2006 in Red Bank, New Jersey.

In 2006's Clerks II, she played Dante Hicks' fiancée, Emma Bunting; and a minor role of Betsy in Smith's 2008 film Zack and Miri Make a Porno. Schwalbach appeared as Esther Cooper in Kevin Smith's horror film, Red State and voiced Blunt-Girl in Jay & Silent Bob's Super Groovy Cartoon Movie!.

In 2010, she and her husband began co-hosting a podcast called Plus One. As of June 2025, there were 77 episodes.

On February 23, 2011, Kevin Smith revealed on G4tv's Attack of the Show that on May 9, 2011, he would be launching SModcast Internet Radio (S.I.R.) which would stream live content and feature live shows including SMorning with Jen & Kev, later renamed Plus One Per Diem, a morning radio show featuring Smith and Schwalbach.

== Personal life ==
Born in Newark, New Jersey, Schwalbach married Kevin Smith at Skywalker Ranch on April 25, 1999, becoming involved with him after interviewing him for USA Today regarding rumors that he was the true author of Good Will Hunting. She helped Smith deal with the stress he experienced from the drug addiction of his friend Jason Mewes, who was living with them. For several years, she would witness Mewes' repeated sobriety and relapses, and at one point, she banned him from their house, but Mewes eventually got sober.

Her daughter with Smith, Harley Quinn Smith, was born June 26, 1999. Schwalbach has been vegetarian for most of her life.

== Filmography ==
Year	Title	Role	Notes
2001	Jay and Silent Bob Strike Back	Missy	
2002	Now You Know	Bachelor Party Hooker	
2004	Jersey Girl	Susan	
2004	Oh, What a Lovely Tea Party		Director, documentary
2005	Degrassi: The Next Generation	The Blonde / Camera Assistant	Episodes: "Goin' Down the Road", Part 1 and 2
2006	Clerks II	Emma Bunting	
2008	Zack and Miri Make a Porno	Betsy	
2011	Red State	Esther	
2013	Jay & Silent Bob's Super Groovy Cartoon Movie!	Bluntgirl (voice)	Associate producer
2014	Tusk	Gimli Slider Waitress	Executive producer
2015	The Mission	Behind Door #2	Short
2016	Yoga Hosers	Ms. McKenzie	Producer
2019	Jay and Silent Bob Reboot	Ms. McKenzie	
2022	Clerks III	Emma Bunting	
