= Yoga Hosers =

2016 film by Kevin Smith

- Theatrical release poster
- Directed by: Kevin Smith
- Written by: Kevin Smith
- Produced by: Liz Destro; Jordan Monsanto; Jennifer Schwalbach
- Starring: Lily-Rose Depp; Harley Quinn Smith; Vanessa Paradis; Austin Butler; Tyler Posey; Johnny Depp
- Cinematography: James Laxton
- Edited by: Kevin Smith
- Music by: Christopher Drake
- Production companies: StarStream Media; Abbolita Films; XYZ Films; Destro Films; SModcast Pictures
- Distributed by: Invincible Pictures
- Release dates: January 24, 2016 (Sundance Film Festival); September 2, 2016 (United States)
- Running time: 88 minutes
- Country: United States
- Language: English
- Budget: $5 million
- Box office: $38,784

Yoga Hosers is a 2016 American comedy horror film written and directed by Kevin Smith. It is a spin-off of Smith's 2014 horror film Tusk and it features Smith's daughter Harley Quinn Smith, Lily-Rose Depp and her father Johnny Depp reprising their roles with Justin Long, Haley Joel Osment, Genesis Rodriguez, Harley Morenstein, Ralph Garman, and Smith's wife Jennifer Schwalbach Smith appearing in new roles. New cast members include Lily-Rose Depp's mother Vanessa Paradis in addition to Austin Butler and Tyler Posey. The second film in Smith's True North trilogy, it had its world premiere on January 24 at the 2016 Sundance Film Festival before being released on September 2, 2016, by Invincible Pictures. The film was a commercial flop and was panned by critics, who viewed it as a low point in Smith's career.

== Plot ==
Colleen Collette and Colleen McKenzie are two 15-year-old girls who spend their days studying yoga with their guru, Yogi Bayer, and working an after-school job at a Manitoba convenience store called Eh-2-Zed. They are also in a cover band called Glamthrax with their 35-year-old friend Ichabod on drums. The two are invited to a party by a popular senior, Hunter Calloway, who is the object of Colleen M's affections.

The next day at school, the girls' history teacher informs the class that the Nazi Party once had influence in Winnipeg. Led by the self-proclaimed "Canadian Führer" Adrien Arcand and his right-hand man, Andronicus Arcane, the Canadian Nazis were once a great force of terror. Arcand was later arrested by Federal authorities, but Andronicus Arcane was never found.

Colleen C's father Bob and his girlfriend Tabitha decide to take a spontaneous trip to Niagara Falls, leaving the girls to run the store on the night of Hunter's party. The Colleens invite Hunter and his friend Gordon Greenleaf to bring the party to the store so that they would not miss out. Colleen M escorts Hunter to the back room at his request, only to discover that Hunter and Gordon are actually Satanists who wish to sacrifice and dismember the Colleens. Before this can occur, an army of little monsters called Bratzis (one-foot-tall Nazis made from bratwurst) attack and kill Hunter and Gordon. Using their yoga skills, the Colleens fight and defeat the Bratzis, but are soon arrested for the murder of Hunter and Gordon.

Legendary man-hunter Guy LaPointe, who had an encounter with the Colleens once before, arrives at the police station to interrogate the girls. Having obtained some of his own evidence of the Bratzis, he believes the girls' testimony and wishes to help them prove their innocence. After sneaking them out of the station and taking them back to the Eh-2-Zed, LaPointe and the Colleens are knocked unconscious by the Bratzis. They are taken to an underground lair beneath the store where they find the Bratzis' master, Andronicus Arcane.

Arcane reveals to LaPointe and the Colleens that he once had dreams of becoming an artist. After having his work ridiculed by various critics, he decided to become a scientist for the Canadian Nazi movement. The Nazis hid him in the underground lair to create a clone army to conquer Canada and the United States. The clones, made from bratwurst and Arcane's DNA, needed to incubate for 100 years before they were fully grown, so Arcane cryogenically froze himself until the time when he and his clones could rise again. This process was interrupted when a power outage at the Eh-2-Zed 70 years later caused Arcane to thaw and the clones' incubation to stop, rendering them just one foot in height.

Learning that the Nazi Party had long since been defeated, Arcane began a new mission to kill all critics as revenge for those that poorly reviewed his early work. He reveals he has constructed a ten-foot-tall goaltender from body parts of the Bratzis' victims to carry out his murderous deeds. This "Goalie Golem" is controlled by the Bratzis who operate it from its insides. No longer wishing to follow Arcane's orders, the Golem kills him and then turns on the Colleens. The Colleens once again use their yoga skills to defeat the Golem and soon after, clear their names.

After being dubbed "Hero Clerks" by the media, the Colleens return to their normal lives and end the film with Glamthrax's cover of "O Canada", accompanied on guitar by Guy LaPointe.

== Cast ==
- Lily-Rose Depp as Colleen Collette, a worker at Eh-2-Zed
- Harley Quinn Smith as Colleen McKenzie, Colleen Collette's co-worker at Eh-2-Zed
- Johnny Depp as Guy LaPointe, a former Sûreté du Québec inspector that helps the Colleens
- Justin Long as Yogi Bayer, a yoga guru. His name is a pun on the titular Hanna-Barbera character.
- Austin Butler as Hunter Calloway, a popular senior whom Colleen M likes
- Adam Brody as Ichabod, a man who plays the drums in the Colleen's Band
- Haley Joel Osment as Adrien Arcand, the fascist leader of the National Unity Party of Canada who Arcane worked for
- Ralph Garman as Andronicus Arcane, the fictional member of the National Unity Party of Canada who served as Arcand's right-hand man
- Tony Hale as Bob Collette, the proprietor of Eh-2-Zed
- Natasha Lyonne as Tabitha, Bob's girlfriend who manages Eh-2-Zed
- Vanessa Paradis as Ms. Maurice
- Tyler Posey as Gordon Greenleaf, a friend of Hunter
- Genesis Rodriguez as Ms. Wicklund
- Jennifer Schwalbach as Ms. McKenzie
- Sasheer Zamata as Principal Invincible
- Harley Morenstein as Toilet Paper Man
- Ashley Greene as 'Peg Mom
- Jack Depp as 'Peg Kid
- Jason Mewes as Rogue Cop
- Kevin Smith as The Bratzis, the bratwurst clones of Adrien
- Kevin Conroy as Canadian Bat, Man!
- Stan Lee as Dispatcher

== Production ==
Smith revealed before the release of Tusk that he had written a spin-off film called Yoga Hosers, which would feature the cast from Tusk.

The title came from a remark Scott Mosier made during an early 2014 segment of SModcast, the podcast he cohosts with Smith. Smith brought up fanciful quotes attributed to Simon Metke, an Edmonton yoga instructor whose home had recently been raided by the Royal Canadian Mounted Police (RCMP), who recovered an artwork stolen from the Montreal Museum of Fine Arts in 2011 there. Mosier imagined the RCMP saying "Open up, yoga hoser!" as they knocked on the door. After it became a catchphrase among the podcast's listeners, Smith announced it would be the title of his next film. The character of Yogi Bayer in the film is also based on descriptions of Metke in the media.

In August 2014, it was revealed Yoga Hosers would be an action-adventure, and the second in the True North trilogy. The film includes the entire cast of Tusk, including Depp's daughter Lily-Rose and Smith's daughter Harley Quinn, starring in their reprised roles as clerks. Tony Hale, Natasha Lyonne, Austin Butler, Adam Brody, Tyler Posey, and Jason Mewes also appear. StarStream Entertainment helped finance and produce the film, while XYZ Films co-produced. In September 2014, it was revealed Haley Joel Osment and Genesis Rodriguez had joined the cast as well, and it was later revealed Kevin Smith would portray a bratzi. Comic book writer Stan Lee had a cameo appearance, his second in a Smith film, after 1995's Mallrats. Thomas Ashley put up 25% of the equity to create the film and was an executive producer.

=== Filming ===
Smith announced on August 20, 2014, that filming had begun, and on September 18, 2014, he stated on SModcast #308 that he had wrapped three quarters of the film, and would finish the last quarter once Depp is available. Principal photography concluded in January 2015.

== Release ==
The film had its world premiere at the 2016 Sundance Film Festival on January 24. A tie-in comic book was also given out exclusively at the Sundance premiere. Written by Kevin Smith and illustrated by Jeff Quigley, Yoga Hosers: When Colleens Collide tells the story of how the girls met and became friends. Later in 2017, Dynamite Entertainment reprinted this special issue for release to comic stores. In April 2016, Invincible Pictures acquired US distribution rights to the film, and initially planned a July 29, 2016, release. The film was later pushed back to September 2.

== Reception ==
Yoga Hosers was panned by critics, who considered it a low point in Smith's film career. On Rotten Tomatoes, the film has a rating of 26%, based on 62 reviews, with an average rating of 3.70/10. The site's critical consensus reads, "Undisciplined, unfunny, and bereft of evident purpose, Yoga Hosers represents a particularly grating low point in Kevin Smith's once-promising career." On Metacritic, the film holds a rating of 23 out of 100, based on 17 critics, indicating "generally unfavorable reviews".

Justin Chang of Variety disliked the film, writing that

Harley Quinn Smith and especially Lily-Rose Depp have sufficient spunk, spark and chemistry (and they're charming bopping through an end-credits cover of "O Canada") that you long to see them in a starring vehicle that doesn't look and feel like an on-screen underwear stain. Shot and edited with the sort of willful slovenliness that presumably fits the anything-goes grab-bag effect Smith was going for, Yoga Hosers looks as though it was probably pretty fun to make, though only the director's hardcore fans and SModcast listeners are likely to find that pleasure in any way infectious.

John DeFore of The Hollywood Reporter also gave the film a negative review, writing that "the young leads seem to be having fun even if you aren't, but any acting careers they might go on to will not be the result of this film."

Korey Coleman of DoubleToasted.com expressed strong criticism for the film, stating that it was the worst movie he had seen in years. He also felt Smith's privilege in obtaining funding for the film was an insult to aspiring filmmakers who struggle to even get a foot in the door of the industry. He placed it at the #1 spot for the worst movie of 2016, tying with Fifty Shades of Black.

In an extended review for The A.V. Club in 2017, Nathan Rabin summed up the film as a "fiasco", blaming "self-indulgence" and "laziness" leading to "Smith combin[ing] what are clearly his two great loves in life: family and making terrible comedies. It's a beautiful thing when a man is able to fuse his personal and professional life this way. It's just a shame the result is borderline unwatchable."

If you were to tell me a midnight movie was coming out that was a cross between Clueless, a second-rate Gremlins knock-off, the 1966 Batman, Strange Brew, and Clerks, I would have said, 'Wow, that sounds great!' If you were to tell me that the same film was written and directed by Smith, however, my response would change to, 'Wow, that sounds terrible!'

— Nathan Rabin, The A.V. Club

== Spin-off ==
Kevin Smith has said that his True North trilogy will conclude with a film titled Moose Jaws, which he describes as "Jaws with a moose". Smith revealed that the Colleens will return for Moose Jaws.
