= Tusk (2014 film) =

Body horror film by Kevin Smith

- Theatrical release poster
- Directed by: Kevin Smith
- Written by: Kevin Smith
- Based on: "SModcast #259: The Walrus and The Carpenter" starring Kevin Smith; Scott Mosier
- Produced by: William D. Johnson; Sam Englebardt; Shannon McIntosh; David Greathouse
- Starring: Michael Parks; Justin Long; Haley Joel Osment; Genesis Rodriguez
- Cinematography: James Laxton
- Edited by: Kevin Smith
- Music by: Christopher Drake
- Production companies: Demarest Films; XYZ Films; SModcast Pictures
- Distributed by: A24
- Release dates: September 6, 2014 (TIFF); September 19, 2014 (United States)
- Running time: 101 minutes
- Country: United States
- Language: English
- Budget: $3 million
- Box office: $1.9 million

Tusk is a 2014 American independent black comedy body horror film written and directed by Kevin Smith, based on a story from his SModcast podcast. The film stars Michael Parks, Justin Long, Haley Joel Osment and Genesis Rodriguez. The film is the first in Smith's planned True North trilogy, followed by Yoga Hosers (2016). The film deals with a narcissistic podcaster (Long) who travels to Canada for an interview, and in the process, meets an eccentric retired sailor (Parks) with dark plans related to his obsession with a walrus named Mr. Tusk.

Tusk had its world premiere at the 2014 Toronto International Film Festival, before it was released by A24 on September 19, 2014, and it received mixed reviews. The film was Smith's first major wide release since Cop Out (2010), and has since become a minor cult film.

== Plot ==
Arrogant best friends Wallace Bryton and Teddy Craft host a podcast called The Not-See Party, where they interview eccentric people. Wallace flies to Canada to interview the "Kill Bill Kid", who has become an internet sensation due to a viral video of him accidentally severing his leg with a katana. The video's popularity was thanks to Wallace's and Teddy's coverage. Wallace's girlfriend Ally stays behind.

Upon arriving in Manitoba, Wallace learns that the interviewee committed suicide. Determined not to waste his trip, he tries to find another person to interview. He finds a flyer offering a free room and the guarantee of interesting stories. Intrigued, he arrives at the mansion of Howard Howe, a retired seaman in a wheelchair.

Howard tells the story of how a walrus, whom he named "Mr. Tusk", rescued him after a shipwreck. Wallace passes out from the secobarbital-laced tea Howard made for him. The next morning, Wallace wakes up to find himself strapped into a wheelchair and his left leg amputated. Howard tells Wallace that a brown recluse spider bit his leg, and the amputation was necessary to save his life. Howard then reveals that he can still walk and lays out his plans to fit Wallace into a perfectly constructed walrus costume in an attempt to re-create Mr. Tusk while carving Wallace's tibia bones into tusk-like shapes. Ally and Teddy, who are having an affair, ignore their phones when Wallace calls for help. After leaving voicemails, Wallace is knocked unconscious by Howard, advising him to stick to "becoming a walrus".

Having read the voicemails and become aware that Wallace is in danger, Ally and Teddy fly to Canada. Back at the mansion, Howard continues to mutilate and alter Wallace while relaying his backstory: He was a Duplessis orphan following his parents' murder, and was physically and sexually abused for five years by the clergy who housed him; as a result, he despises the entire human race. He amputates Wallace's right leg, cuts out his tongue, and stitches the skin of his upper arms to his torso, leaving only his forearms able to move.

A local detective puts Ally and Teddy in touch with Guy LaPointe, who has been hunting Howard for years. LaPointe explains that Howard, nicknamed "First Wife", has been kidnapping and then murdering people for years. His victims' bodies were found with no legs, stitched arms, no tongue, and fragments of tibia bones in their jaws. He warns them that Wallace may still be alive, for now, but that he will eventually be killed.

Meanwhile, Howard finishes sewing Wallace into a walrus costume made of human skin with the tusks attached. Howard proceeds to condition Wallace to think and behave like a walrus. Howard reveals that shortly before being rescued, he had killed and eaten Mr. Tusk to survive. Overcome with guilt, he has spent the last fifteen years turning his victims into his beloved savior in an attempt to relive their last day and give Mr. Tusk another chance at survival.

With Howard later dressed in his homemade walrus pelt, the two engage in a fight that ends when Wallace impales Howard on his tusks after Howard tries to beat him with an oosik. Howard dies satisfied. LaPointe, Ally, and Teddy enter the enclave as Wallace bellows victoriously. LaPointe aims a gun at him to put Wallace out of his misery, much to Ally’s horror.

One year later, Ally and Teddy visit Wallace in a wildlife refuge and feed him a fish. In a flashback, Ally tells Wallace that her grandfather once told her that crying is what separates humans from animals. Ally tearfully tells Wallace she still loves him before leaving. Wallace cries as he bellows, implying he has retained some of his humanity.

== Cast ==
- Michael Parks as Howard Howe, a retired sailor
  - Matthew Shively as Young Howard Howe
- Justin Long as Wallace Bryton, an arrogant podcast host
- Genesis Rodriguez as Ally Leon, the girlfriend of Wallace
- Haley Joel Osment as Teddy Craft, Wallace's friend and equally arrogant podcast co-host
- Johnny Depp as Guy LaPointe, (Note: Johnny Depp was credited in the cast as "Guy LaPointe".) a former Sûreté du Québec inspector who helps Ally and Teddy.

Additional cast members include Harley Morenstein as a border agent and Ralph Garman as a detective. Smith and Depp's daughters, Harley Quinn Smith and Lily-Rose Depp, portray teenage convenience store clerks who would later be featured as the leads of Yoga Hosers. Jennifer Schwalbach Smith, Smith's wife, also makes an appearance as a waitress at Gimli Slider. Doug Banks plays the Kill Bill Kid, a parody of the Star Wars Kid viral video. Zak Knutson has an uncredited appearance as Ernest Hemingway.

== Production ==
The idea for the film came during the recording of "SModcast 259: The Walrus and The Carpenter". In the episode, Smith, with his longtime friend and producer Scott Mosier, discussed an article featuring a Gumtree ad, where a homeowner was offering a living situation free of charge if the lodger agreed to dress as a walrus. The discussion went on from there, resulting in almost an hour of the episode being spent on reconstructing and telling a hypothetical story based on the ad. Smith then told his Twitter followers to tweet "#WalrusYes" if they wanted to see their hypothetical turned into a film, or "#WalrusNo" if they did not. A vast majority of Smith's following agreed that the film should be made. The post on Gumtree was in fact a prank post by Brighton poet and prankster Chris Parkinson, who, upon hearing of the planned film, said he was a big fan of Smith and that he would love to be involved. Smith eventually hired Parkinson as an associate producer in November. During the final fight between Wallace and Howard, the Fleetwood Mac song that shares its name with the title is played.

Smith wrote the 80-page screenplay while waiting for Bob Weinstein's approval of his Clerks III (2022) submission package. It was originally titled The Walrus & the Carpenter, but he changed it into a single-word title, saying he "knew what a movie about a walrus had to be called." The film is set in Bifrost, Manitoba. The movie was originally going to be produced by Blumhouse Productions, but due to Smith's expedited timeline for filming, the two amicably parted ways. Tusk was eventually financed by Demarest Films. Smith had planned on premiering the film at the 2014 Sundance Film Festival, but this was later changed to allow more time for the score to be completed.

Smith was excited about making Tusk, saying, "I wanted to right what I felt was the only wrong of Red State (2011) by scripting something with no religious or sexual politics that could grow up to be a weird little movie and not an indie film call-to-arms or a frustrated self-distribution manifesto. I just wanted to showcase Michael Parks in a fucked up story, where he could recite some Lewis Carroll and 'The Rime of the Ancient Mariner' to some poor motherfucker sewn into a realistic walrus costume." Unlike Smith's previous film Red State, Tusk had a conventional theater release, with distribution handled by A24.

=== Filming ===
The project began pre-production in September 2013. Principal photography began on November 4, 2013, and wrapped on November 22, 2013. The starting date was delayed from September to October, then to November, due to the filming location moving from Canada to North Carolina. An additional two days of filming occurred in Los Angeles for scenes involving Depp's character Guy LaPointe. Smith originally considered Quentin Tarantino to play LaPointe after seeing his appearance in Django Unchained (2012), but Tarantino said that he had no interest in acting at the moment.

== Release ==
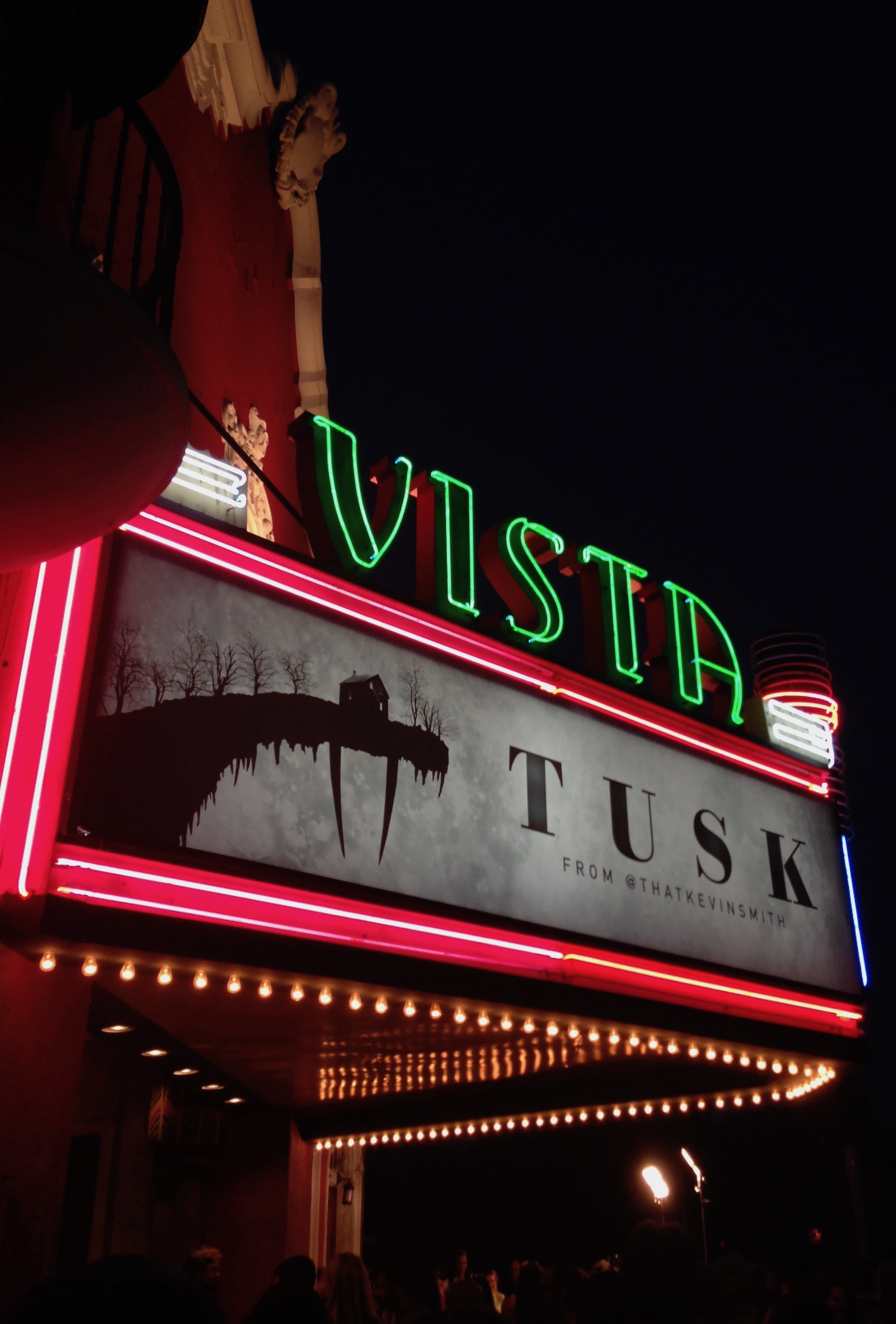
Tusk on the marquee of the Vista Theatre

Tusk had its world premiere on September 6, 2014, at the 2014 Toronto International Film Festival, where it was screened as part of Midnight Madness. It was named the first runner-up to the Midnight Madness People's Choice Award. It was screened in Los Angeles at the Vista Theatre on September 16, 2014, before its wide theatrical release on September 19.

=== Home media ===
Tusk was released via DVD and Blu-ray on December 30, 2014. Special features on both formats include an audio commentary by Smith, deleted scenes, the original podcast, and two featurettes.

== Reception ==
=== Box office ===
The film was released on September 19, 2014, and was declared a box-office bomb, earning $846,831 from over 602 screens during its opening weekend, debuting in fourteenth place at the box office. At the end of its run, on November 13, the film had grossed $1,826,705 in the domestic box office and $21,612 overseas for a worldwide total of $1,848,317.

=== Critical response ===
Tusk was met with mixed reviews from critics. On Rotten Tomatoes, the film holds a rating of 45%, based on 136 reviews, with an average rating of 5.7/10. The site's summary reads, "Tusk is pleasantly ridiculous and charmingly self-deprecating, but that isn't enough to compensate for its thin, overstretched story." On Metacritic, the film has a score of 55 out of 100, based on 33 critics, indicating "mixed or average reviews".

In his review for The Seattle Times, Erik Lundegaard gave the film zero out of four stars, stating, "Tusk, which is based on one of Smith's own podcasts, is the most disgusting and pointless movie I've seen. Emphasis on pointless. I spent half the movie sick to my stomach." William Bibbiani, writing for CraveOnline, criticized the film's failed humor and excessive runtime and said that the film "killed irony", awarding it two out of ten stars, while Glenn Dunks of Junkee.com gave the film an F and called it the worst movie of 2014.

Conversely, Henry Barnes of The Guardian rated the movie four out of five stars, complimenting Smith as returning to his "snarky best". Chris Bumbray of JoBlo.com had a positive reaction, calling Tusk "a major return to form for Smith, and an exciting new chapter in a career that now feels totally reinvigorated." Roth Cornet from IGN gave the film eight out of ten and stated, "Funny, strange, disquieting, and occasionally gory, Tusk is Kevin Smith at his best." Richard Roeper of the Chicago Sun-Times also gave Tusk a positive review, writing, "I'm recommending Kevin Smith's uniquely twisted Tusk, but there's a part of me that wishes I could un-see it. Over the last 15 years, I've seen thousands of movies, and I can count on one hand the number of times I've actually closed my eyes during a screening because I needed a quick three-second break." Clint O'Connor of The Plain Dealer noted that while Tusk skillfully combines various genres, the story would be better presented as a short film.

== Spin-offs and possible sequel ==
Smith revealed before the release of Tusk that he had written a spin-off film called Yoga Hosers (2016), which would feature the cast from Tusk. On August 19, 2014, Borys Kit from The Hollywood Reporter revealed further details about the film. Yoga Hosers is an action-adventure film and the second in the True North trilogy. The film features Lily-Rose Depp, her father Johnny and Smith's daughter Harley Quinn Smith reprising their roles from Tusk, with Justin Long, Haley Joel Osment and Genesis Rodriguez returning, albeit in different roles.

The third installment of Smith's True North trilogy is to be titled Moose Jaws, which Smith says is basically "Jaws with a moose". Starstream Entertainment will finance and produce the film, while XYZ Films will sell the foreign rights at the Toronto Film Festival.

Smith also mentioned an idea for a sequel, where somehow Long's Wallace would turn himself back into a human and become the new villain. Smith made mention of the title being Tusk$. In 2022, Long revealed that he had been contacted by Smith about working on a potential sequel.
