= Now You Know (film) =

- Directed by: Jeff Anderson
- Written by: Jeff Anderson
- Produced by: Ray Ellingsen; Jean-Luc Martin
- Starring: Jeremy Sisto; Jeff Anderson
- Cinematography: Marco Cappetta
- Edited by: Jerry A. Vasilatos
- Music by: Lanny Cordola; Matt Sorum
- Distributed by: Genius Products
- Release date: December 13, 2002
- Running time: 102 minutes
- Country: United States
- Language: English
- Budget: $380,000 (estimated)

Now You Know is a 2002 comedy film directed, written by and starring Jeff Anderson. The film was produced by the Lumberyard production company (Alek Petrovic, Eric Nordness and Thomas Stelter). It was released theatrically in the United States on December 13, 2002, and on DVD on November 28, 2006.

== Plot ==
On the eve of his bachelor party, Jeremy (Jeremy Sisto) learns that his fiancée, Kerri (Rashida Jones), wants to call off their wedding without providing a reason. He tries to determine what caused this sudden decision. The unmarried couple returns to New Jersey to sort out their relationship. When Jeremy gets home, he hangs out with Gil and Biscuit, his old friends, who have made a hobby out of breaking into other people's homes and rearranging the objects to freak out the homeowners. Their activities have begun to unnerve one unfortunate homeowner in particular, Mr. Victim (Stuart Pankin). Jeremy, Gil, and Biscuit go to their local bar for a few drinks and talk about women and Jeremy's aborted wedding. Meanwhile, Kerri and her best friend Marty go to a lesbian bar, where Marty tells her she is pregnant. The next morning, Jeremy's friend from Vegas, Shane, comes to visit as Biscuit and Gil throw him another bachelor party. The bachelor party goes awry when the stripper Biscuit hired arrives, and is revealed to be a transvestite, who tells Jeremy that she saw Kerri at the lesbian bar the night before, and everyone thinks she is in a lesbian relationship with Marty. Gil and Biscuit take Jeremy and Shane to go mess with the house again, but Mr. Victim has become paranoid and shoots wildly at them, grazing Jeremy's ear. Faced with his own mortality, Jeremy and the others drive to Kerri's so he can talk to her. She tells him that he took her for granted. Jeremy tells her he would do anything to have her back, just as Gil walks in and says Marty is beating up Biscuit on the front lawn. Biscuit, thinking Marty and Kerri were gay, asked Marty if he could be their manager. During the fight, the men learn that Marty is pregnant and that Gil is the father. Kerri and Jeremy give Gil and Marty their plane tickets for their honeymoon in Florida, so the new couple can have some alone time, while Kerri and Jeremy hold hands, hinting at a possible reconciliation.

== Cast ==
- Jeremy Sisto as Jeremy
- Rashida Jones as Kerri
- Jeff Anderson as Gil
- Trevor Fehrman as Biscuit
- Todd Babcock as Shane
- Earl Boen as Grandpa
- Heather Paige Kent as Marty
- David Bosnak as Security Jimmy
- Paget Brewster as Lea
- Bijoux Deluxe as K.C.
- Anthony John Denison as Gary Richards
- Debbe Dunning as Sun Goddess
- Louis Herthum as Bar Patron
- Brendan Hill as Cliff
- Edie McClurg as Pat
- Stuart Pankin as Mr. Victim
- Jake Richardson as Teddy
- Will Rothhaar as Eddy
- Liz Sheridan as Grandma

== Reception ==
Preston Jones of DVD Talk criticized the film as derivative and too similar to the style of Kevin Smith. Scott Tobias of The A.V. Club gave the film a negative review and said it "tried to pass off crudity for honesty".

== Recognition ==
- 2002 San Diego Film Festival – Best Feature Film – Nominated
- 2002 IFP Chicago Film Festival – Official Selection
- 2002 Greenwich Film Festival – Official Selection
- 2002 Big Bear International Festival – Official Selection

== Home media ==
The film was released on DVD on November 28, 2006. The packaging has a small sticker which reads, "Featuring the stars of Clerks II!"
