= Trevor Fehrman =

American actor and writer

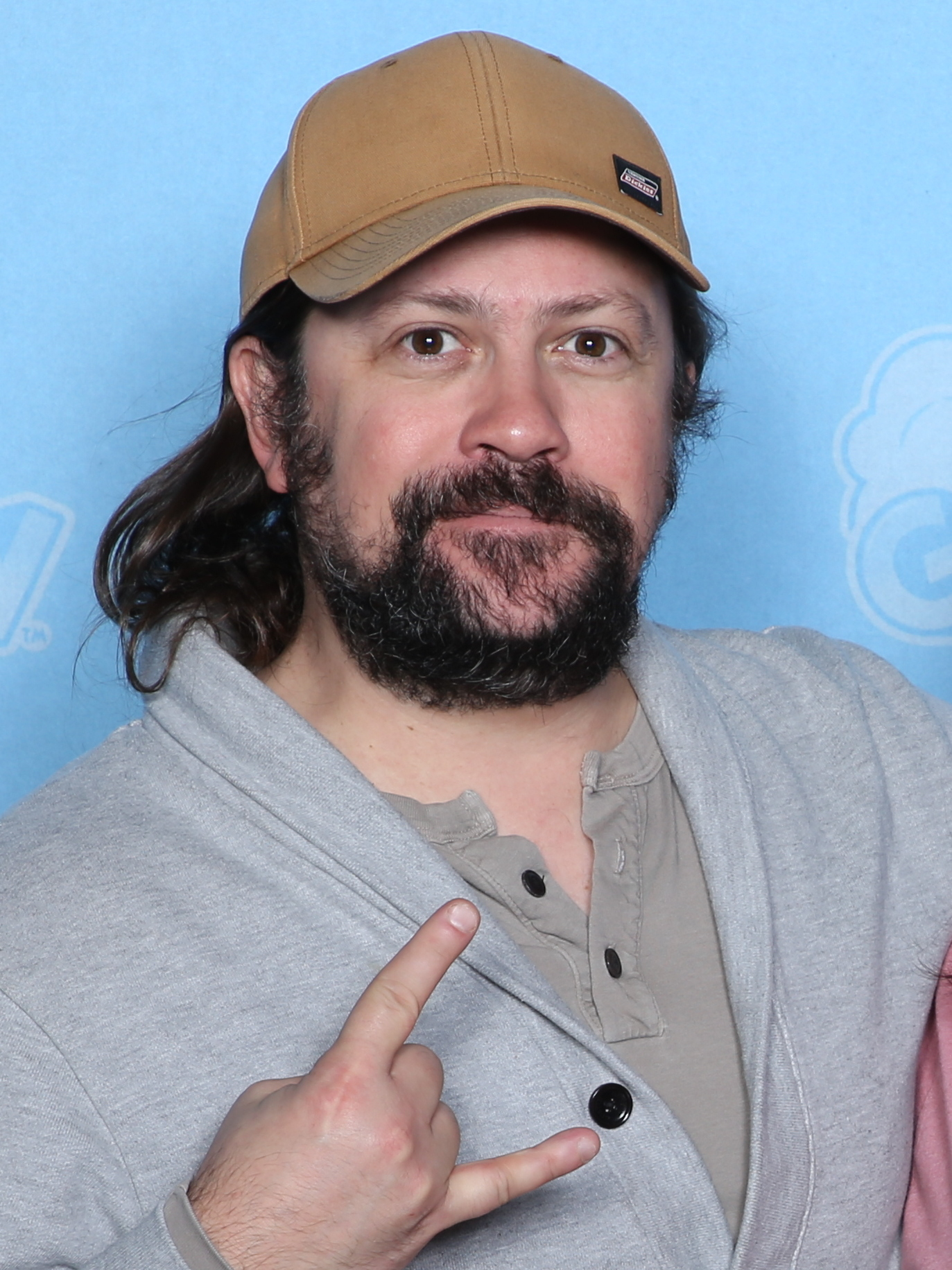
- Fehrman at GalaxyCon in Columbus in 2022
- Born: Trevor Gregory Fehrman; July 14, 1981 (age 45); South St. Paul, Minnesota, U.S.
- Occupations: Actor, writer
- Years active: 1998–2006, 2022

Trevor Gregory Fehrman (born July 14, 1981) is an American actor and writer best known for his portrayal of Elias in the comedy films Clerks II and Clerks III.

== Life and career ==
Fehrman is most widely known for his role in the films Clerks II and Clerks III in which he plays Elias Grover, Dante and Randal's new co-worker at the Mooby's fast food chain. Fehrman also appeared in Now You Know, which was written, directed and also featured Clerks II co-star Jeff Anderson. He also played Handsome Davis, a teen student who cheats his way through high school in Cheats.

In 2013, Fehrman contributed film reviews for the website Film Racket.

== Filmography ==
=== Film ===
Year	Title	Role	Notes
2002	Cheats	Handsome	
2002	Now You Know	Biscuit	
2006	Clerks II	Elias	
2022	Clerks III	Elias	

=== Television ===
Year	Title	Role	Notes
1998–1999	Encore! Encore!	Michael Pinoni	4 episodes
1999–2000	Odd Man Out	Keith Carlson	13 episodes
