= Harley Quinn Smith =

American actress and musician (born 1999)

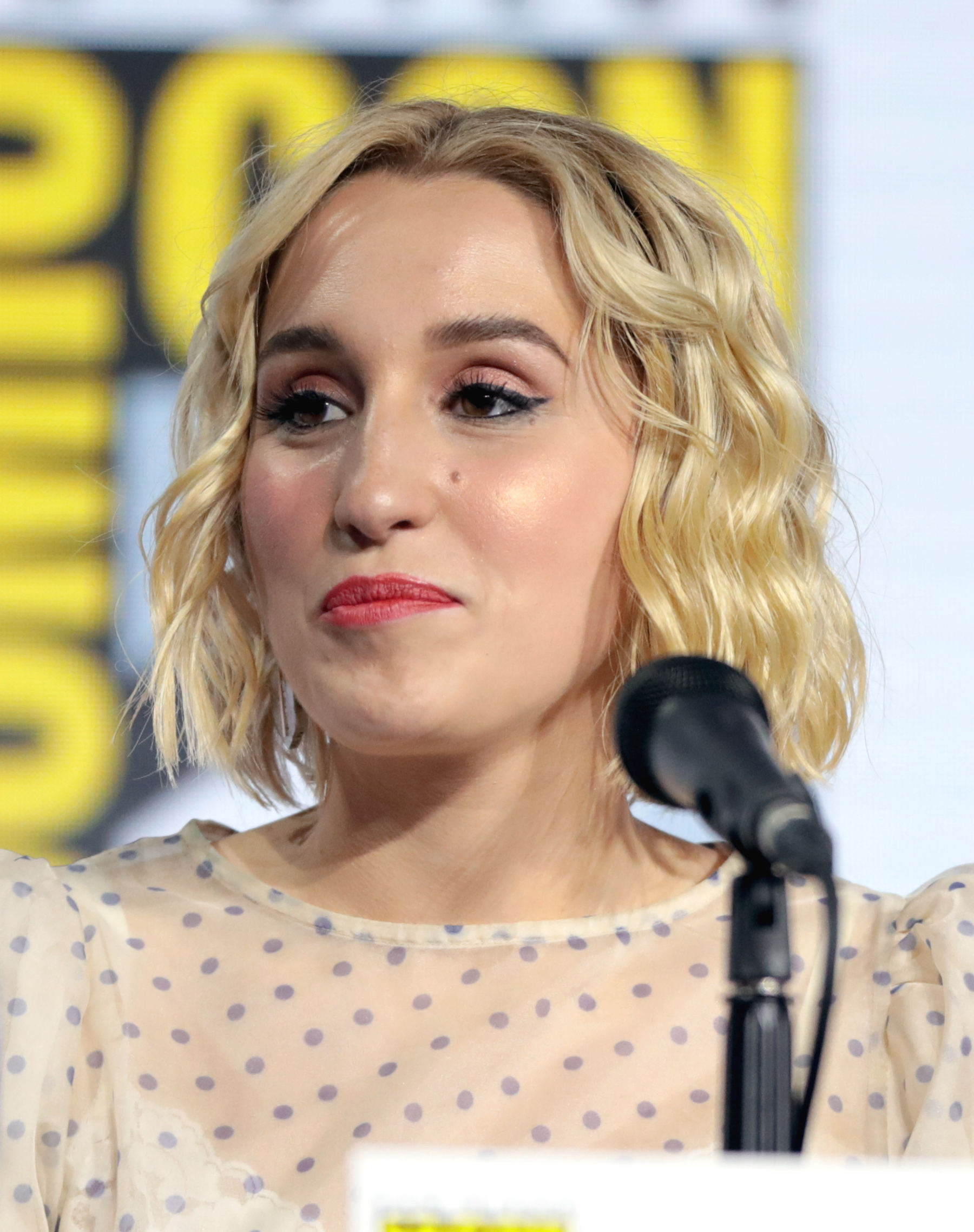
- Smith at the 2019 San Diego Comic-Con
- Born: June 26, 1999 (age 27); Red Bank, New Jersey, U.S.
- Occupations: Actress; musician
- Years active: 2001–present
- Parents: Kevin Smith (father); Jennifer Schwalbach Smith (mother)

Harley Quinn Smith (born June 26, 1999) is an American actress and musician. Smith is most known for her role as a convenience store clerk in the film Tusk and starred in its spin-off Yoga Hosers, both written and directed by her father, filmmaker Kevin Smith. She is also the bass player and one of the singers in the punk rock band The Tenth. She also appeared in Jay and Silent Bob Reboot.

== Early life ==
Harley Quinn Smith was born in Red Bank, New Jersey, the daughter of Kevin Smith and actress and journalist Jennifer Schwalbach Smith. She was named after the DC Comics character Harley Quinn.

== Career ==
Smith made her acting debut in her father's film Jay and Silent Bob Strike Back, by portraying the recurring character Silent Bob as a toddler. In 2004, she had an uncredited cameo as Tracy Colelli in the drama film Jersey Girl and two years later in the comedy film Clerks II. In 2014, she had a small role in the thriller film Tusk, a role she reprised in a starring capacity in 2016's Yoga Hosers. In January 2016, it was announced that Smith will play her father's character's daughter in the half-hour comedy Hollyweed.

In 2017, Smith was cast as Lindsay in All These Small Moments, which premiered at the 2018 Tribeca Film Festival.

Smith joined John Barrowman and other co-hosts in the debut September 15, 2018 episode of DC Daily, a discussion show focusing on DC Universe comic topics

In early 2019, Smith rejoined her father's View Askewniverse, playing Millennium "Milly" Faulken in Jay and Silent Bob Reboot. According to Kevin Smith, Milly is part of a girl-gang (made up of characters played by Aparna Brielle, Treshelle Edmond, and Alice Wen) that is not unlike the girl-gang of Jay and Silent Bob Strike Back; however, their goals and motivations are different, and they were put together as a commentary on Hollywood's use of youth and diversity in reboots and sequels. Kevin Smith says that Milly's role in the gang is similar to Shannon Elizabeth's character Justice, her character being the daughter of Jay and Justice. The movie was released in 2019. She also had a small role in Quentin Tarantino's Once Upon a Time in Hollywood, portraying a member of the Manson Family.

Smith used to host a podcast with her father about veganism. The podcast, titled "Vegan Abattoir," started in 2020 and ran for 19 episodes. In 2024 they teamed up once again to host the podcast 'Beardless, D*ckless Me' on the iHeartRadio network.

== Personal life ==
Smith is good friends with and a frequent co-star of actresses Lily-Rose Depp and Aparna Brielle.

Smith is bisexual, and a vegan.

== Filmography ==
=== Film ===
Year	Title	Role	Notes
2001	Jay and Silent Bob Strike Back	Baby Silent Bob	
2004	Jersey Girl	Tracy Colelli	Uncredited
2006	Clerks II	Kid in Window	
2014	Tusk	Clerk Girl #1	
2016	Holidays	Holly	Segment: "Halloween"
2016	Yoga Hosers	Colleen McKenzie	
2018	All These Small Moments	Lindsay	
2019	Once Upon a Time in Hollywood	"Froggie"	
2019	Madness in the Method	Herself	
2019	Jay and Silent Bob Reboot	Millennium "Milly" Faulken	
2021	Nineteen on Fire	Beth	Short film
2022	KillRoy Was Here	Wendy	
2022	Student Body	Nadia Parker	
2022	Clerks III	Millennium "Milly" Faulken	
2024	The 4:30 Movie	Sister Sugar Walls	

=== Television ===
Year	Title	Role	Notes
2014, 2016	Comic Book Men	Herself	2 episodes
2017	Supergirl	Izzy Williams	Episode: "Supergirl Lives"
2018	Hollyweed	TBA	Pilot
2019	Halloween Wars	Herself	Episode: "The Swarm"
2020	Day by Day	Liza	Voice role; episode: "Neighbor Guy"
2021	Cruel Summer	Mallory Higgins	Main role (season 1)
2023	The Boulet Brothers' Dragula	Herself	Guest Judge (season 5)
2024	Masters of the Universe: Revelation	Queen Amelia	Voice role; Episode: "Ascension"
