= Lily-Rose Depp =

French and American actress and model (born 1999)

- Depp in 2026
- Born: Lily-Rose Melody Depp; May 27, 1999 (age 27); Neuilly-sur-Seine, Hauts-de-Seine, France
- Citizenship: France; United States
- Occupations: Actress; model
- Years active: 2014–present
- Parents: Johnny Depp (father); Vanessa Paradis (mother)
- Relatives: Alysson Paradis (aunt)

Lily-Rose Melody Depp (born May 27, 1999) is a French and American actress and model. Born to actors Johnny Depp and Vanessa Paradis, she began her acting career in film with a minor role in Tusk (2014) and pursued a career as a fashion model. She appeared in the period dramas The Dancer (2016) and The King (2019), and the romantic comedy A Faithful Man (2018).

In 2023, Depp starred in the HBO television drama series The Idol and contributed to its soundtrack with her single "One of the Girls", which charted on the Billboard Hot 100 and surpassed one billion streams on Spotify. She received praise for her starring role in the Gothic horror film Nosferatu in 2024.

== Early life ==
Lily-Rose Melody Depp was born in the American Hospital of Paris located in Neuilly-sur-Seine, Hauts-de-Seine, a wealthy suburb of Paris on May 27, 1999. She is the daughter of American actor Johnny Depp and French singer and actress Vanessa Paradis. She has a younger brother, John Christopher "Jack" Depp III. French actress Alysson Paradis is her aunt.

On her father's side, she is of primarily English descent, with some French, German and Irish descent, as well as African descent through an eighth great-grandmother of her father, Elizabeth Key Grinstead, who, in 1656, became the first African-American in the North American colonies to successfully sue for her freedom.

Depp is the goddaughter of novelist François-Marie Banier and singer Marilyn Manson. Since her birth, she has been the subject of tabloid and media reporting, including birthdays, attendance at society events, and reviews of her fashion choices.

In 2012, after 14 years together, Depp's parents separated and arranged joint custody of her. She divides her time between Los Angeles, Paris, and New York City. Depp dropped out of high school in 2016 to focus on her acting career.

== Career ==
=== 2014–2018: Early work in independent films and modeling ===
Depp made her acting debut in 2014, with a minor role in the horror comedy film Tusk. In 2015, at age 16, Depp began her modeling career as a brand ambassador for the French fashion house Chanel, in a decision personally overseen by Karl Lagerfeld (In 1991, her mother was also an ambassador, and promoted the fragrance Coco for Chanel, in an advertisement shot by Jean-Paul Goude.) Depp has since become closely associated with Chanel, serving as one of its most prominent faces. She has also modeled for the brand on runways and in numerous fashion magazines, including Vogue, Glamour, Elle, i-D, Wonderland, Love, Madame Figaro, W, and V.

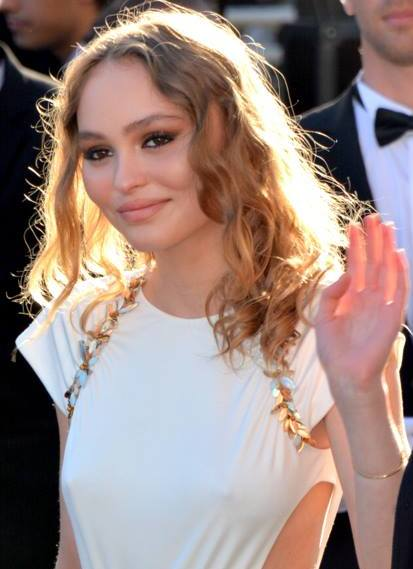
Depp in 2017

In 2016, Depp reprised her Tusk role in the spin-off Yoga Hosers. In February 2017, both she and her mother Vanessa Paradis were photographed for Our City of Angels magazine; proceeds from its sale were donated to Planned Parenthood.

She then landed her first major role portraying the American dancer Isadora Duncan in The Dancer, which premiered at the Cannes Film Festival in the Un Certain Regard category. For her performance in the film, Depp was nominated for Most Promising Actress at the 42nd César Awards and Best Female Revelation at the 22nd Lumières Awards. She also appeared in the film Planetarium alongside Natalie Portman, who handpicked Depp to play her younger sister. In that same year, Depp was made the face of Chanel's iconic fragrance Chanel No. 5 L'Eau.

In 2018, Depp starred opposite Laurent Lafitte in Les Fauves ('Savages'). The film was premiered in France in October 2018. In the same year, Depp starred in A Faithful Man, directed by Louis Garrel, and co-written by Oscar winner Jean-Claude Carrière. The film was premiered at the Toronto International Film Festival in September and released in France in December 2018. She received her second nomination for Most Promising Actress at the 44th César Awards.

=== 2019–present: Mainstream films ===
In 2019, Depp appeared in the Netflix documentary short Period. End of Sentence. alongside Priyanka Chopra. It won the Academy Award for Best Documentary Short Film at the 91st Academy Awards. In April 2019, Depp was nominated for the Prix Romy Schneider. She starred alongside her aunt Alysson Paradis in the French independent short film Quel Joli Temps Pour Jouer Ses Vingt-ans, in which she played a young woman grieving the loss of a grandfather. In the historical epic war film The King, Depp appeared as Catherine of Valois opposite Timothée Chalamet as Henry V. The film had its world premiere at the 2019 Venice Film Festival, and was released on Netflix in November 2019. Of her performance, Owen Gleiberman of Variety wrote, "[Depp] makes her presence felt, for perhaps the first time ever, as Catherine of Valois, whose delicate worldliness matches Henry's", while Rory O'Connor of The Film Stage called it "an excellent cameo".

In 2021, Depp appeared in the opioid epidemic crime thriller Crisis (originally titled Dreamland) alongside Gary Oldman, Armie Hammer, Evangeline Lilly and Michelle Rodriguez. The film was released in the United States to mixed critical reception. She also appeared in Neil Burger's science-fiction thriller Voyagers and the Christmas horror comedy Silent Night. Depp starred alongside George MacKay in Nathalie Biancheri's psychological drama Wolf. The film premiered at TIFF in 2021 to mixed critical reception.

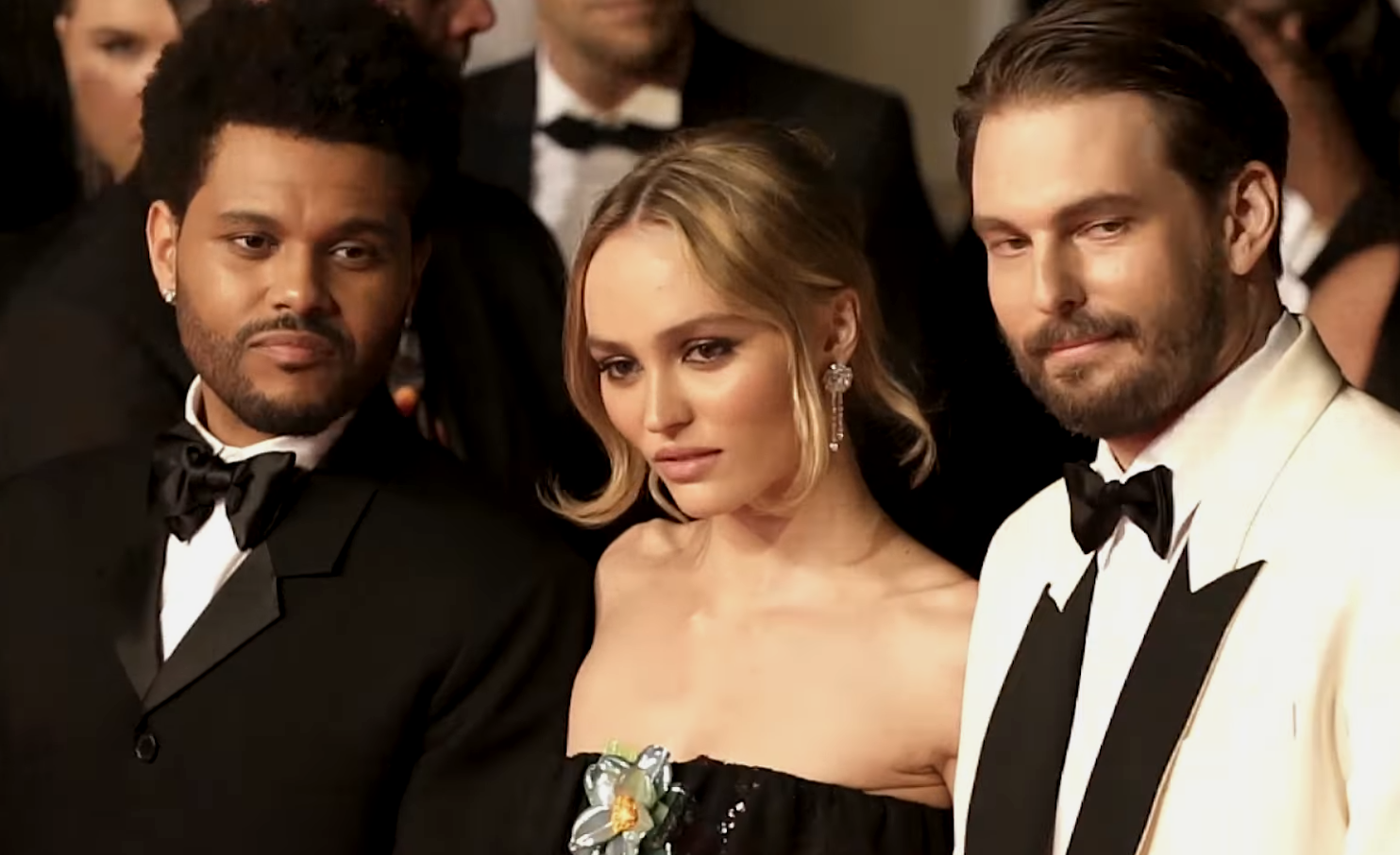
The Weeknd, Depp, and Sam Levinson at The Idol premiere at the 2023 Cannes Film Festival

In 2023, Depp made her television debut starring in the HBO drama series The Idol alongside Canadian singer the Weeknd. The series premiered at the 2023 Cannes Film Festival, where it was met with highly unfavorable reception from critics for its graphic sexual content and themes. On her performance, TIME wrote that Depp "brings some tentative gravity to all the sordidness". The series aired on HBO and Max and was cancelled after one season. The single that Depp recorded for the series along the Weeknd and Jennie, "One of the Girls", peaked at number 51 on the Billboard Hot 100 chart and surpassed 1 billion streams on Spotify. The track was included on The Idol Episode 4 (Music from the HBO Original Series) EP and the 2024 deluxe edition of the Weeknd’s greatest hits album The Highlights (2021).

In 2024, Depp starred as Ellen Hutter, a young woman traumatized by the vampire Count Orlok, in Robert Eggers's gothic horror film Nosferatu. Terming it a "transfixing performance", The Hollywood Reporter's David Rooney added that "the movie belongs to Depp, whose performance is a revelation". She has been cast in a film directed by Lorraine Nicholson about Hugh Hefner's Playboy Mansion.

== Personal life ==
Depp is bilingual in English and French and holds dual American and French citizenship. She has struggled with and recovered from anorexia.

In August 2015, she posed for iO Tillett Wright's Self-Evident Truths Project, stating she fell somewhere "on the LGBTQ spectrum". She later clarified she was simply making a statement on defining oneself, not on her own sexuality.

Depp dated actor Timothée Chalamet for over a year after meeting on the set of The King in 2018. Since January 2023, she has been in a relationship with rapper and singer Danielle Balbuena, also known as 070 Shake. This has been the only relationship that Depp has publicly acknowledged. Depp confirmed the relationship in an Instagram post on May 11, 2023.

In October 2024, Depp starred in the music video for 070 Shake's single "Winter Baby / New Jersey Blues".

== Filmography ==
=== Film ===
Year	Title	Role	Notes	Ref.
2014	Tusk	Girl Clerk #2	Credited as Lily-Rose Melody Depp	
2016	Yoga Hosers	Colleen Collette		
2016	The Dancer	Isadora Duncan		
2016	Planetarium	Kate Barlow		
2018	Savage	Laura		
2018	A Faithful Man	Eve		
2019	Period. End of Sentence.	Herself	Documentary short film	
2019	My Last Lullaby	Paloma	Short film	
2019	The King	Catherine of Valois		
2021	Crisis	Emmie Kelly		
2021	Voyagers	Sela		
2021	Silent Night	Sophie		
2021	Wolf	Cecile (Wildcat)		
2024	Nosferatu	Ellen Hutter		
2026	Alpha Gang	Alpha Four		
2026	Werwulf †	Woman	Post-production	

=== Television ===
Year	Title	Role	Notes	Ref.
2023	The Idol	Jocelyn	Main role	

=== Music videos ===
Year	Song title	Artist	Ref.
2015	"All Around the World"	Rejjie Snow	
2023	"Double Fantasy"	The Weeknd featuring Future	
2023	"One of the Girls"	The Weeknd, Jennie and Lily-Rose Depp	
2024	"Winter Baby / New Jersey Blues"	070 Shake	

== Discography ==
Title	Year	Album	Ref.
"La Ballade de Lily Rose"	2000	Bliss	
"Firmaman"	2000	Bliss	
"Bliss"	2000	Bliss	
"I'm the Man" (with Harley Quinn Smith)	2016	Yoga Hosers Soundtrack	
"Babe" (with Harley Quinn Smith)	2016	Yoga Hosers Soundtrack	
"O Canada" (with Harley Quinn Smith)	2016	Yoga Hosers Soundtrack	
"World Class Sinner / I'm a Freak"	2023	The Idol Episode 1 (Music from the HBO Original Series)	
"One of the Girls" (with the Weeknd and Jennie)	2023	The Idol Episode 4 (Music from the HBO Original Series)	
"Fill the Void" (with the Weeknd and Ramsey)	2023	The Idol Episode 4 (Music from the HBO Original Series)	
"Dollhouse" (with the Weeknd)	2023	The Idol Episode 5 Part 2 (Music from the HBO Original Series)	
"Lost Time" (Troye Sivan featuring Lily-Rose Depp)	2026	She's the Best	

== Awards and nominations ==
Year	Award	Category	Nominated work	Result	Ref.
2017	42nd César Awards	Most Promising Actress	The Dancer	Nominated	
2017	22nd Lumières Awards	Best Female Revelation	The Dancer	Nominated	
2019	44th César Awards	Most Promising Actress	A Faithful Man	Nominated	
2019	Prix Romy Schneider	Most Promising Actress	Herself	Nominated	
2025	5th Critics' Choice Super Awards	Best Actress in a Horror Movie	Nosferatu	Nominated	
2025	2025 Fangoria Chainsaw Awards	Best Lead Performance	Nosferatu	Nominated	
2025	Georgia Film Critics Association Awards	Best Actress	Nosferatu	Nominated	
2025	29th Satellite Awards	Best Actress in a Motion Picture – Drama	Nosferatu	Nominated	
2025	29th Satellite Awards	Best Cast in a Motion Picture	Nosferatu	Won	
