= Genesis Rodriguez =

American actress (born 1987)

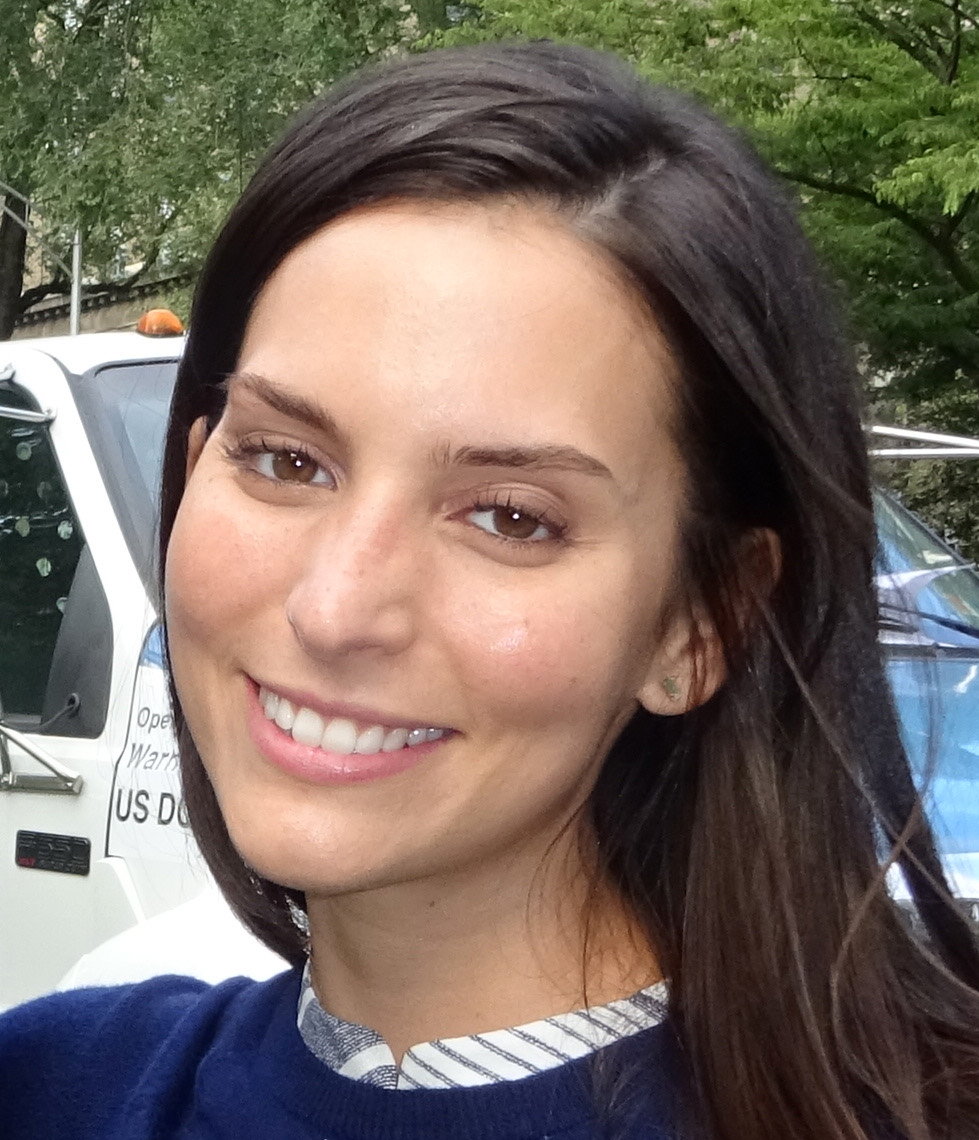
- Rodriguez in 2016
- Born: Génesis Rodríguez Pérez; July 29, 1987 (age 39); Miami, Florida, U.S.
- Occupation: Actress
- Years active: 1994–present
- Father: José Luis Rodríguez

Génesis Rodríguez Pérez (born July 29, 1987) is an American actress. She began her career playing leading roles in the Telemundo telenovelas Prisionera (2004), Dame Chocolate (2007) and Doña Bárbara (2008–2009). She co-starred with Paul Walker in Hours (2013). She is also known for her television roles as Sarah on the HBO series Entourage (2010–2011), assistant museum curator/adventurer Jane Walker on the ABC series Time After Time (2017), Captain Josephina Carrillo on the Paramount+ spy thriller Lioness (2024-present), and journalist Isabel De Leon on the third season of the Netflix action thriller The Night Agent (2026). She has starred in the films Man on a Ledge (2012), Casa de Mi Padre (2012), What to Expect When You're Expecting (2012), The Last Stand (2013), Tusk (2014), and Run All Night (2015). She provided the voice of Honey Lemon in the Disney animated film Big Hero 6 (2014), a role she reprised in Big Hero 6: The Series (2017–2021).

== Early life ==
Rodriguez was born July 29, 1987, in Miami, Florida. Her mother, Luisa Carolina "Carol" Pérez Rodríguez, is a Cuban actor. Her father, José Luis Rodríguez, is a Venezuelan actor and singer who is also known by the nickname "El Puma". Her parents married in 1996.

== Career ==
As a child, Rodriguez performed as one of the young dancers on the Venezuelan children's series El Club de Los Tigritos. Upon returning to Miami, she continued private education with a tutor and obtained a recurring role on the NBC daytime soap opera Days of Our Lives from November 2005 to January 2006. In addition to American television, Rodriguez landed Spanish-language roles and played dual leads as Rosita Amado and Violeta Hurtado in the primetime series Dame Chocolate, which aired on Telemundo.

In 2012, Rodriguez had a substantial role as the love interest of Will Ferrell in the comedy film Casa de Mi Padre, a spoof in the style of the Mexican soap operas of the 1970s. She followed that role with an appearance in the action-thriller film The Last Stand in 2013, playing the villainous FBI Agent Ellen Richards, as well as appearing in the comedy Identity Thief as Marisol. In 2014, Rodriguez lent her voice to Honey Lemon in the Disney animated film Big Hero 6. In February 2017, she appeared as the main female role in the music video for Romeo Santos's song Héroe Favorito. In 2022, she appeared in the recurring role of superhero Sloane Hargreeves in The Umbrella Academy season 3.

== Filmography ==
=== Film ===
Year	Title	Role	Notes
2012	Man on a Ledge	Angie	
2012	Casa de Mi Padre	Sonia	
2012	What to Expect When You're Expecting	Courtney	
2013	The Last Stand	Agent Ellen Richards	
2013	Identity Thief	Marisol	
2013	Hours	Abigail Hayes	
2014	Tusk	Ally Leon	
2014	Big Hero 6	Honey Lemon	Voice role
2015	Run All Night	Gabriela Conlon	
2016	Yoga Hosers	Ms. Wicklund	
2018	Delirium	Lynn	
2018	Icebox	Perla	
2020	Centigrade	Naomi	
2024	The 4:30 Movie	Hot Usher	

=== Television ===
Year	Title	Role	Notes
1994	El Club de Los Tigritos	Dancer	
2004	Prisionera	Libertad Salvatierra Santos	Main cast
2007	Dame Chocolate	Rosa "Rosita" Amado / Violeta Hurtado	Main cast
2008–2009	Doña Bárbara	Marisela Barquero / Young Bárbara Guaimarán	Main cast
2010–2011	Entourage	Sarah	Episodes: "Stunted", "Dramedy", "Out with a Bang"
2017	Time After Time	Jane Walker	Main cast
2017	Elena of Avalor	Amalay	Voice role; episode: "The Jewel of Maru"
2019	The Passage	Alicia	Episode: "Pilot"
2017–2021	Big Hero 6: The Series	Honey Lemon	Main cast; voice role
2018	Law & Order: Special Victims Unit	Lourdes Vega	Episodes: "Remember Me", "Remember Me Too"
2018–2020	She-Ra and the Princesses of Power	Perfuma	Main cast; voice role
2020	The Fugitive	Detective Sloan	Web series; main cast
2022	The Umbrella Academy	Sloane Hargreeves / Sparrow Number Five	Main cast (season 3)
2023	Neon	Isa	3 episodes
2024–	Lioness	Captain Josephina Carrillo	Main cast (season 2)
2026	The Night Agent	Isabel De Leon	Main cast (season 3)

=== Music videos ===
Year	Title	Artist(s)
2017	"Héroe Favorito"	Romeo Santos
2024	"Texas"	Blake Shelton

=== Video games ===
Year	Title	Voice role	Notes
2019	Kingdom Hearts III	Honey Lemon	
2025	Disney Speedstorm	Honey Lemon	
