= H3 Podcast =

Commentary podcast

- H3 Podcast logo
- Genre: Variety
- Format: Audio; video
- Language: English

Creative team
- Created by: Ethan Klein

Cast and voices
- Hosted by: Ethan Klein
- Starring: Hila Klein; Daniel Swerdlove; Zach Louis; AB Ayad; Lena Ayad; Love "Yungfika"; Olivia Lopes; Tom Ward; Nathan Curiel; Tamara Joseph; Others: H3 After Show; David Valdes; Kate "GirlWithAMicrophone"; Harley Morenstein; Secondary crew; Galya Kovach; Avery Christmas; Blizzardwuffy; Former crew; Cam Grants; Sam Temple; Ian Slater; Morgan Smalley

Technical specifications
- Video format: YouTube

Publication
- No. of seasons: 5
- No. of episodes: 1100+
- Original release: December 20, 2016

Related
- Related shows: h3h3Productions; Frenemies; Leftovers

YouTube information
- Channel: H3 Podcast
- Subscribers: 2.56 million
- Views: 1.56 billion
- Last updated: April 3, 2026

The H3 Podcast is a live comedy and commentary podcast hosted by Ethan Klein. The show aired on YouTube and started in 2016.

According to the 2023 U.S. Podcast Report by Triton Digital, the podcast was among the 100 most downloaded podcasts in 2023. The podcast ranked 22nd in Edison Research's list of shows with the largest weekly audience in the third quarter of 2023.

In October 2026, Ethan's wife Hila Klein announced that they had separated after alleging Ethan admitted to engaging in an extramarital affair, with the H3 Podcast entering an indefinite hiatus.

== History ==
=== Origins ===
The H3 Podcast was originally hosted on YouTube, then streamed on Twitch before being moved back to YouTube on May 19, 2018. Its first episode, featuring Justin Roiland, co-creator of Rick and Morty, was uploaded to the h3h3Productions YouTube channel on December 20, 2016, before being re-uploaded on the H3 Podcast channel on April 7, 2017. The podcast began with conversational interviews with notable internet personalities such as PewDiePie, Post Malone, and Jake Paul.

The podcast grew alongside Hila Klein's clothing line Teddy Fresh, promoting the brand to the audience which became popular among fans.

=== Hiatus ===
On October 22, 2026, Ethan announced that the H3 Podcast would go on an "indefinite hiatus". One day later, Hila Klein stated on Instagram that she and Ethan separated after she discovered he had an extramarital affair. In light of Hila's accusations, the H3 Podcast's crew condemned Ethan's alleged actions, and announced they cut ties with him. On the same day in an Instagram post, Ethan Klein indicated he was in the process of removing his ownership from the podcast.

Following the couple's legal separation on October 13, Hila filed for divorce on November 2.

== Shows ==
=== Past shows ===
==== Frenemies and Families ====
In Frenemies, the show was hosted by Trisha Paytas and Ethan Klein on the H3 Podcast channel. Largely, the podcast focused on personal experiences, pop culture, internet drama, and mental health. Ultimately, it consisted of 39 episodes and two accompanying vlogs. Volatile at times, Paytas and Klein’s friendship was occasionally tumultuous, leading to episodes that were incomplete due to a verbal argument. However, the podcast came to an end during its 39th episode after a dispute between Paytas and Klein about podcast revenue and production ownership. Although it ended, Frenemies gained recognition in the podcasting world and appeared on numerous Top 50 lists, frequently pulling in millions of viewers per episode.

Subsequently, the Families podcast was created in response to Paytas unexpectedly quitting Frenemies. Along with discussing internet drama, Families focused on Ethan’s relationship with his parents and was co-hosted by his mother, Donna Klein, while also featuring his father, Gary Klein. Near the end of its run, Families aired its last official episode in August 2021 and reunited for a special holiday episode in December 2021.

==== Leftovers ====
Leftovers, a left-leaning political podcast co-hosted by Hasan Piker and Klein, was launched in September 2021. Tubefilter reported that the first episode reached one million views in its first day. This podcast ended after its 61st episode, which was a nearly four-hour discussion of the October 7 attacks and their ramifications in the context of the broader Israeli–Palestinian conflict.

==== H3TV, Off the Rails and H3 After Dark ====
H3TV, Off the Rails and H3 After Dark are shows that were hosted on the H3 Podcast channel and aired on Monday, Wednesday and Friday respectively. All three came to an end on the same week and were merged into a single show, the H3 Show, which airs three times a week.

== Controversies and lawsuits ==
=== Triller Fight Club II LLC v. The H3 Podcast ===
In May 2021, Triller's event company filed an amended complaint in the US District Court for the Central District of California against the H3 Podcast and Kleins, seeking $50 million in damages. The lawsuit alleged copyright infringement in the now-deleted podcast episode titled "Jake Paul Fight Was a Disaster", which aired five days after the Jake Paul vs. Ben Askren fight and featured knockout footage along with Ethan's commentary on the event.

=== YouTube suspensions ===
In May 2022, the channel was suspended when Ethan joked on air that someone should bomb the National Rifle Association of America (NRA) convention. In October 2022, it received a strike and one-week suspension following comments directed at Jewish conservative political commentator Ben Shapiro, in which Ethan stated he hoped "Ben gets gassed first. Or last" in the event of a second Holocaust. In a statement, a YouTube spokesperson said that the channel was given a strike for "violating the platform's harassment policy". Ethan responded later that "[a] few white supremacists successfully lobbied YouTube to suspend me, a Jewish dual citizen of Israel & USA, for antisemitism."

== Nominations ==
Year	Ceremony	Category	Work	Result	Refs
2018	Streamy Awards	Best Podcast	H3 Podcast	Nominated	
2019	Streamy Awards	Best Podcast	H3 Podcast	Nominated	
2020	Streamy Awards	Best Podcast	H3 Podcast	Nominated	
2022	Streamy Awards	Best Podcast	H3 Podcast	Nominated	
2023	Streamy Awards	Best Podcast	H3 Podcast	Nominated	
