= Hacmon =

Hacmon or Hakmon (Hebrew: חכמון) is a Jewish surname. The ANU museum suggests that it is derived from the Hebrew: חכם, romanized: hakham, lit. 'wise man'. Notable persons with the surname include:

- Hila Hacmon, the maiden name of Hila Klein (born 1987), Israeli-American podcaster and former member of H3h3Productions
- Liam Hakmon (born 1998), Israeli singer-songwriter
- Lior Hakmon (born 1982), Israeli basketball player
- Livia Hakmon Ayeli (born 1952), Israeli actress
- Moses Hacmon (born 1977), Israeli photographer

== See also ==
- Hakmoun
- Hakham (surname)
