= Trisha Paytas =

American media personality (born 1988)

- Paytas performing at the 2025 WorldPride Music Festival in Washington, D.C.
- Born: May 8, 1988 (age 38); Riverside, California, U.S.
- Occupations: Media personality; actress; singer; YouTuber
- Years active: 2006–present
- Spouse: Moses Hacmon (m. 2021)
- Children: 3
- Relatives: Hila Klein (sister-in-law); Ethan Klein (brother-in-law)

YouTube information
- Channels: blndsundoll4mj; justtrishpodcast; PaytasHacmonFamilyChannel
- Genres: Vlog; podcast; music; mukbang; ASMR
- Subscribers: 5.14 million (main channel); 7.2 million (combined) (Note: Subscribers, broken down by channel: 5.14 million (blndsundoll4mj); 756 thousand (justtrishpodcast); 1.4 million (PaytasHacmonFamilyChannel))
- Views: 968.9 million (main channel); 1.2 billion (combined) (Note: Views, broken down by channel: 968.9 million (blndsundoll4mj); 170.9 million (justtrishpodcast); 62.6 million (PaytasHacmonFamilyChannel))
- Last updated: April 8, 2026

Trisha Paytas (/ˈpeɪtəs/; born May 8, 1988) is an American media personality, actress, author, singer, and YouTuber. She (Note: Paytas uses she/her and they/them pronouns. This article uses she/her for consistency.) is known for her multifaceted career on YouTube, marked by numerous online controversies and feuds. Her content spans numerous genres, including lifestyle vlogs and mukbangs.

As a podcaster, Paytas co-hosted the popular but short-lived podcast Frenemies (2020–2021) with Ethan Klein and later launched her own show, Just Trish (2023–present). Additionally, she has independently released several albums and singles and appeared in various screen roles, music videos, and stage productions.

== Early life ==
Paytas was born on May 8, 1988 in Riverside, California. She is of Greek, Hungarian, and Moroccan ancestry. She moved to Freeport, Illinois, at age three. At age 15, Paytas moved back to California and was enrolled in a Catholic online school program. At the age of 16, Paytas returned to Illinois to attend high school in Pecatonica, Illinois.

== Career ==
=== 2006–2012: Beginnings in acting and YouTube ===
After moving to Los Angeles to pursue acting, Paytas began doing professional lingerie modeling and worked as a stripper and an escort to support herself. She was featured on various television shows, attempting and failing to break the fastest-talker record on Guinness World Records Unleashed with 710 words in 54 seconds, which landed her appearances on The Greg Behrendt Show and The Ellen DeGeneres Show, showcasing her talent. In 2007, Paytas competed in Stan Lee's reality competition series, Who Wants to Be a Superhero?, where she portrayed Ms. Limelight, before being eliminated fourth.

Paytas also registered her YouTube channel in 2007. It was originally dedicated to movie director Quentin Tarantino, whom Paytas idolized, but soon after being created, Paytas began to focus on other types of videos. On the channel, Paytas primarily gives fashion, beauty, and relationship advice.

In 2010, Paytas appeared in an episode of My Strange Addiction as a self-admitted tanning addict, despite being aware of the high chances of developing skin cancer, among others. Paytas appeared in several music videos by various artists, including Amy Winehouse's "Tears Dry on Their Own" (2007), Eminem's "We Made You" (2009), and The All-American Rejects' "Beekeeper's Daughter" (2012).

=== 2013–2017: Online success and music releases ===
From 2013 to 2017, Paytas made a number of trolling videos, which she told Business Insider were a way to "dumb [her]self down" in order to get more attention and views. This involved videos claiming that dogs do not have brains or that she was voting for the 2012 Republican candidate for President of the United States, Mitt Romney. In 2014, Paytas began posting widely viewed mukbang sessions and eating-challenge videos. In September 2014, Paytas competed in an episode of the television game show Celebrity Name Game, along with her mother.

In 2015, the video for her song, "Fat Chicks," was featured on websites such as Cosmopolitan, The Huffington Post, and Business Insider. In 2016, her EP Daddy Issues appeared on the Billboard Top Heatseekers albums chart, debuting at number 25.

In 2017, Paytas became a celebrity housemate on British reality series Celebrity Big Brother, for its twentieth series. After 11 days of participation, she voluntarily quit the series, placing thirteenth overall. Upon her exit, she proceeded to make disparaging comments about fellow participants, including accusations of drug use.

=== 2018–2022: Concert tour, Frenemies, Sadboy2005 band, and OnlyFans ===
In 2019, Paytas embarked on her own headlining tour, The Heartbreak Tour, to promote her music.

In September 2020, Paytas began co-hosting the podcast Frenemies with h3h3Productions creator Ethan Klein. The show, which featured the two discussing pop culture and their often-conflicting opinions, became an immediate success, frequently described as one of the most popular podcasts on YouTube during its run.

On June 8, 2021, after 41 episodes, Paytas announced she was leaving the show following an on-air dispute with Klein regarding production and creative ownership. Her abrupt departure effectively ended the podcast and led to a prolonged and highly public feud, with both Paytas and Klein exchanging accusations on social media and in subsequent videos. In the aftermath, a private text message exchange between Paytas and Klein was posted on social media, leading to accusations against Paytas of antisemitism, for which she later apologized.

Also in 2021, Paytas formed and fronted the emo pop/pop-punk band Sadboy2005, which featured Social Repose. The band released an eponymous debut EP album the same year, followed by the EP album "Trigger Warning" in 2021. They have also released five music videos.

Beginning in 2020, Paytas began making pornographic content on OnlyFans, a subscription service site, which she's said to have made around $150,000 per month. She stopped posting explicit content in 2023, following a change of views after the birth of her daughter.

=== 2023–present: Mainstream breakthrough ===
In May 2023, Paytas and internet comedian Colleen Ballinger began co-hosting their podcast, Oversharing with Colleen & Trish. On July 9, 2023, after only three episodes, Paytas announced the podcast had been cancelled amidst grooming allegations brought against Ballinger and the surfacing of leaked messages in which Ballinger sent videos from Paytas's OnlyFans to fans making fun of her. Paytas said she reached out to Ballinger about the allegations, and she denied them.

In July, Paytas began hosting her second podcast titled Just Trish Podcast. Co-hosted by Oscar Gracey, the podcast sees Paytas commenting on current pop culture topics. Originally planned as a weekly series, Just Trish gained significant YouTube viewership, which inspired Paytas to publish two episodes a week and invite various guests to talk on the podcast. The August 2023 episode featuring Tana Mongeau was the first episode of Just Trish to reach over one million viewers. As of August 2025, Just Trish attracted a total of approximately 145 million YouTube views across 200 episodes, making it one of the most successful projects of Paytas's career.

In 2024, Paytas signed with the Creative Artists Agency (CAA) as her talent agent. On December 7, 2024, Paytas made a surprise guest appearance on Saturday Night Live hosted by Paul Mescal. She appeared as herself in a sketch that parodied the annual Spotify Wrapped feature. On December 10, she starred in a live holiday show at the Beacon Theater titled Trisha Paytas: Trishmas Live. Paytas expanded her stage presence the following year in February 2025 when she starred in her own, Trisha Paytas' Big Broadway Dream, a one-night benefit show at the St. James Theater. The show featured performances from Sutton Foster, Ben Platt, Joy Woods, and Rachel Zegler.

Also in 2025, Paytas embarked on her first-ever North American tour, titled The Eras of Trish Tour. The tour ran from February to June and spanned over 30 cities across the United States and Canada. The show was described as a live, multimedia retrospective celebrating the various "eras" of her long and varied internet career. The performances included live singing, costume changes, and video montages of her most viral moments, from her early YouTube videos and music to her mukbangs and podcasting career. Reviews noted the highly engaged and enthusiastic reception from her fanbase, describing the show as a mix of musical numbers, personal anecdotes, and comedy.

In October, it was announced that Paytas would make her Broadway debut in the second revival of Beetlejuice, portraying the role of Maxine Dean from November 4–23. Later that month, it was announced that Paytas would appear in season three of HBO's teen drama series Euphoria.

In March 2026, MGM Resorts International announced the Trisha Paytas & Tana Mongeau: Viva Las Vegas live show would be coming to The Chelsea at The Cosmopolitan of Las Vegas hotel in June. On November 10, Paytas published her memoir Crying on the Kitchen Floor with Grand Central Publishing. In the week after its release, Crying on the Kitchen Floor debuted #3 on The New York Times Best Seller list, as well as Amazon Charts' Top 20 Most Sold & Most Read Books of the Week of November 18, where it debuted at #7.

== Personal life ==
Paytas dated American YouTuber Jason Nash from 2017 to 2019. In early 2020, she started dating Israeli artist Moses Hacmon. The pair was engaged later that year and married in late 2021. Despite previously being told by doctors that she would not be able to conceive a child naturally, Paytas gave birth to her and Hacmon's first child, a daughter. She gave birth to her second daughter in 2023. In 2025, she and Hacmon welcomed their third child, a son.

Paytas has identified with different religious beliefs throughout her life, mainly Roman Catholicism.

Paytas has stated that she became addicted to cocaine from the ages of 18 to 20 while working as a stripper. Paytas was introduced to methamphetamine in 2019 by two men she dated months apart, both of whom later passed away one month apart in 2022. In an interview with Ethan Klein, Paytas stated she was later hospitalized for a methamphetamine overdose. Paytas has stated that her main addiction was to prescription pills. When she met her future husband, Moses, she was using xanax, but later quit. Paytas has suffered from mental health problems, having been diagnosed with borderline personality disorder.

In October 2019, Paytas received criticism for coming out as a trans man online, due to having previously identified as a chicken nugget, ostensibly in a facetious manner. In a March 2021 interview with Vulture, she clarified that she identifies as nonbinary and said that when she came out as transgender in 2019, she "didn't have the vocabulary to describe it at the time." In April 2021, Paytas released a video on her main YouTube channel, in which she discussed her previous gender confusion and reaffirmed her non-binary identity. She has since preferred to use the gender pronouns she/her and they/them.

=== Reincarnation meme ===
Paytas's pregnancies and births have been the subject of a recurring internet meme which suggests her children are the reincarnations of prominent public figures who died around the time of her children's births. The phenomenon began in September 2022, when the birth of her first daughter occurred days after the death of Queen Elizabeth II, sparking viral jokes about the connection.

The meme continued and evolved with her subsequent pregnancies. Following King Charles III's cancer diagnosis in February 2024, social media users humorously predicted he would be reincarnated as her second child. The theory resurfaced again in April 2025 after the death of Pope Francis, with new memes suggesting he would be reincarnated as her then-unborn third child. This expansion of the joke beyond the British monarchy prompted Paytas to address it on her podcast, asking, "Is it just any influential person that dies gets to come reincarnated as my baby?" The meme culminated in July 2025, when musician Ozzy Osbourne died on the same day that Paytas, in her first podcast episode since giving birth to her third child, officially announced her son's name.

Paytas has publicly addressed the conspiracy theories, telling Rolling Stone that while she understands it's a joke, she has found the experience upsetting and feels it has sometimes "ruined" the announcement of her children's births.

== Influences ==
Paytas has recognized Marilyn Monroe, Jessica Simpson (both of whom she's portrayed in music videos), Anna Nicole Smith, The Girls Next Door–Holly Madison, Bridget Marquardt and Kendra Wilkinson– as her primary influences. She has cited the Olsen Twins (from their appearance on Full House) and Playboy models as catalysts in her early desire for fame, Quentin Tarantino as her reason for moving to Los Angeles to pursue her acting career, and Andy Kaufman as her "comedic inspiration".

Paytas is a fan of Britney Spears, Nicola Coughlan, Zendaya and Sabrina Carpenter.

== Filmography ==
Film
Year	Title	Role	Notes
2008	Yes Man	Convention goer	Uncredited
2010	Faster	Stripper	Uncredited
2011	Jackass: Inception	Steve-O's girl	Short film
2011	To.get.her	Fantasy girl	
2011	Sex, Drugs and Randy Van Stone	Sex tape girl	
2011	Geezas	Bored blonde	
2012	Wanderlust	David's wife	Uncredited
2013	The Incredible Burt Wonderstone	Stunt double	
2013	Beverly Hills Cop	Buxom blonde #2	Television film
2013	Water & Power	Stripper	
2013	Lola's Love Shack	Deluxe	
2014	Viral Video	Trisha Paytas	Short film
2015	Viral Video 2	Trisha Paytas	Short film
2016	It Gets Worse	Trisha Paytas	Short film

Television as actress
Year	Title	Role	Notes
2006	Character Fantasy	Sexy Ninja	Uncredited; Episode: "Polyanna: Catherine Zeta-Jones"
2010	Tim and Eric Awesome Show, Great Job!	Eric's date	Episode: "Lucky"
2011	The Car Show	Modified girl	Episode: "Blast from the Past and Look into the Future"
2011	Conan	Football player	Episode: "Return to the Devil's Condo"
2011	Modern Family	Plastic surgery girl	Uncredited; Episode: "Go Bullfrogs!"
2011	The 1st Annual Critics' Choice Television Awards	Body shots girl	Television special
2013	Walk of Shame	Sally	Episode: "When Harry Held Sally"
2013	Nathan For You	Video game girl	Episode: "Clothing Store/Restaurant"
2013	Family Tree	Extreme character	Uncredited; Episode: "The Box"
2024	Saturday Night Live (season 50)	Spotify Wrapped host	Season 50, Episode: "Paul Mescal/Shaboozey"
2026	Euphoria	Video podcast host #3	Episode: "This Little Piggy"
2026	Hacks	Trisha	Episode: "D'Amazing Race" & "The Garden"

Television as self
Year	Title	Notes
2006	Character Fantasy	1 episode ("Polyanna: Catherine Zeta-Jones")
2006	The Greg Behrendt Show	Recurring role
2007	The Next Best Thing	Contestant; Episode: "May, 30, 2007"
2007	Who Wants To Be a Superhero?	Season 2 Contestant; 7th place
2008	The Price Is Right	Contestant; "Episode #36.66"
2010	My Strange Addiction	Episode: "Pilot"
2010	Supreme Court of Comedy	Defendant; Episode: "Kevin Nealon vs. Jamie Kennedy"
2011	Ellen	Speed Reading Guest; Episode: "Episode #8.99"
2011	Who Wants To Date A Comedian?	Contestant; Episode: "Greg Wilson"
2011	Judge Alex	Defendant; Episode: "Metz vs. Paytas"
2011	The Millionaire Matchmaker	Contestant; Episode: "The Young and the Loveless"
2012	Inside Edition	Guest; Episode: "Tanning Mom Becomes Talk of the Nation"
2012	America's Got Talent	Season 7 Contestant; Episode "Tampa Bay Auditions: Part 2"
2012	1000 Ways To Die	Episode: "Die-Abestic"
2013	Dr. Phil	Guest; Episode: "Girls Who Bash Girls Who Dress Sexy"
2013	Double Divas	Cameo; Episode: "Rhythm and Boobs"
2013	Guinness World Records Gone Wild	Guest; Episode: "Bungee Breakfast"
2014	Celebrity Name Game	Contestant; Episode: "Mena Suvari & Joely Fisher"
2016	To Tell The Truth	Contestant; Episode: "Brooks Wheelan"
2017	This Is Everything: Gigi Gorgeous	Documentary
2017	Celebrity Big Brother UK	Series 20 Housemate; Walked Day 11 (13th place)
2019	The Doctors	Guest; Episode: "October 23, 2019"
2024	Playboy TV	Episode: "December 19, 2024"
2025; 2026	Watch What Happens Live with Andy Cohen	2 episodes
2026	Rider Die	Episode: "Trisha Paytas"

Music videos
Year	Title	Artist	Role
2007	Tears Dry on Their Own	Amy Winehouse	Streetwalker
2009	We Made You	Eminem	Jessica Simpson
2010	Playing the Part	Jamey Johnson	Bimbo #3
2011	Sleepless in Silverlake	Les Savy Fav	Marilyn Monroe
2012	Beekeeper's Daughter	The All-American Rejects	Stripper
2024	Woman's World	Katy Perry	Monster truck diva

Theatre
Year	Title	Role	Notes
2025	Trisha Paytas' Big Broadway Dream	Herself	St. James Theatre, Broadway, 1 night
2025	Beetlejuice	Maxine Dean	Palace Theatre, Broadway, November 4–23

Podcasts
Year	Title	Role	Host	Notes
2016	Shane and Friends	Herself; guest	Shane Dawson	1 episode ("August, 7, 2016")
2019	No Jumper	Herself; guest	Adam22	1 episode ("August, 8, 2019")
2019-2020	The Dish with Trish	Herself; host	Herself	43 episodes
2020-2021	H3 Podcast	Herself; guest	Ethan Klein	4 episodes
2020-2021	Frenemies	Herself; co-host	Ethan Klein & Herself	39 episodes
2021-2022	Storytime	Herself; guest	Gabbie Hanna	5 episodes
2021-2023	Zach Sang Show	Herself; guest	Zach Sang	2 episodes
2023-present	Just Trish Podcast	Herself; host	Herself	
2023	Workin' on it with Mehgan Trainor & Ryan Trainor	Herself; guest	Meghan Trainor & Ryan Trainor	1 episode ("April, 19, 2023")
2023	Oversharing with Colleen & Trish	Herself; co-host	Colleen Ballinger & Herself	4 episodes
2023	Vulnerable	Herself; guest	Christy Carlson Romano	1 episode ("Episode 69")
2024-present	Not Loveline with Tana and Trish	Herself; co-host	Tana Mongeau & Herself	
2024	Call Her Daddy	Herself; guest	Alex Cooper	1 episode ("January, 17, 2024")
2025	Too Many Tabs - Der Podcast	Herself; guest	Carolin Worbs & Miguel Robitzky	1 episode ("March, 4, 2025")
2026	I've Never Said This Before with Tommy DiDario	Herself; guest	Tommy DiDario	1 episode ("April, 7, 2026")
2026	On Purpose with Jay Shetty	Herself; guest	Jay Shetty	1 episode ("October, 29, 2026")
2026	We Need to Talk	Herself; guest	Paul C. Brunson	1 episode ("November, 3, 2026")
2026	Howie Mandel Does Stuff	Herself; guest	Howie Mandel	1 episode ("November, 4, 2026")

Pornographic films
Year	Title	Role	Notes
2012	This Ain't Jaws XXX	Cameo	Non-sex scenes
2012	Horny Birds	Cameo	Non-sex scenes
2020	Trisha Paytas, Adam22 and Lena The Plug	Performer	
2021	Trisha Paytas: First Scene	Performer	
2022	Blooming Babes	Performer	
2022	Strap-on Surprise	Performer	
2022	When The Professor's Away	Performer	

== Discography ==
All song credits adapted from Spotify and Apple Music.

=== As lead artist ===
==== Singles ====
Year	Title	Album
2026	"반짝 스텝 Banjjak Step"	Non-album singles
2026	"I Love You" (사랑해; Saranghae)	Non-album singles
2026	"Crying on the Kitchen Floor"	Non-album singles
2024	"Pink Christmas"	Non-album singles
2023	"Shoulda"	Non-album singles
2021	"Freaky (Spanish Version)"	Non-album singles
2021	"I Love You Moses"	Non-album singles
2020	"Covid Christmas"	Non-album singles
2020	"Only Fan"	Non-album singles
2019	"Hot Girl Christmas"	Non-album singles
2019	"Iconic"	Non-album singles
2019	"What Dreams Are Made Of"	Non-album singles
2019	"Crazy and Desperate"	Non-album singles
2018	"Playground (TRK MRK Remix)"	Non-album singles
2018	"Cozy Christmas (feat. Jason Nash)"	Non-album singles
2018	"Milk and Cookies"	Non-album singles
2018	"Shallow"	
2018	"I Love You Jesus (Trap Remix)"	
2018	"Chicken Parmesan and Heartbreak"	Chicken Parm and Heartbreak
2018	"A Christmas Jesus Bop"	Non-album singles
2018	"Never The Bride"	Non-album singles
2017	"A Jesus Bop"	Non-album singles
2017	"I Love You Jesus	Non-album singles
2017	"I Hate My Life"	Non-album singles
2017	"Freaky"	Chicken Fingers and Lipo
2016	"Warrior"	Warrior
2016	"Born to Make You Happy"	Non-album single
2016	"Cinderella"	Showtime
2016	"Showtime"	Showtime
2016	"Everytime"	Non-album singles
2015	"Christmas Sucks"	Non-album singles
2015	"Merry Trishmas"	Non-album singles
2015	"O Holy Night"	Non-album singles
2015	"Superficial Bitch"	Superficial Bitch
2015	"Fat Chicks"	Fat Chicks
2014	"Santa Baby"	Non-album single

==== Extended plays ====
Title	Details
Postpartum Popstar	Released: February 14, 2025; Label: Self-released; Format: Digital download, streaming; Track listing: 1. "Bubbly"; 2. "Lullaby"; 3. "McGriddle"; 4. "GAY"
Rebirth	Released: November 27, 2019; Label: Self-released; Format: Digital download, streaming; Track listing: 1. "After Love"; 2. "Revenge"; 3. "Show Me Yours"; 4. "Yesterday"
Songs From My Kitchen Floor	Released: August 8, 2019; Label: Self-released; Format: Digital download, streaming; Track listing: 1. "Red Flags"; 2. "Possessive"; 3. "Glass Surface"; 4. "Advice"
Chicken Parm and Heartbreak	Released: November 8, 2018; Label: Self-released; Format: Digital download, streaming; Track listing: 1. "Miss You In My Sheets"; 2. "There She Goes"; 3. "Boy"; 4. "Chicken Parmesan and Heartbreak"; 5. "Six Feet Under"
Chicken Fingers and Lipo	Released: April 24, 2017; Label: Self-released; Format: Digital download, streaming; Track listing: 1. "Freaky"; 2. "Silence"; 3. "Self Control"; 4. "Beautiful Disaster"; 5. "Phoenix"
Warrior	Released: December 30, 2016; Label: Self-released; Format: Digital download, streaming; Track listing: 1. "Thick (feat. Søn Wolf)"; 2. "Pinup Girl"; 3. "Did This To Yourself"; 4. "Warrior"
Showtime	Released: September 6, 2016; Label: Self-released; Format: Digital download, streaming; Track listing: 1. "Cinderella"; 2. "Showtime"; 3. "Feel The Same"; 4. "Is This Love?"; 5. "Damn I Look Good"
Superficial Bitch	Released: June 29, 2015; Label: Self-released; Format: Digital download, streaming; Track listing "Superficial Bitch": 1. "Leonardo DiCaprio"; 2. "Lust"; 3. "There You Go"
Fat Chicks	Released: March 6, 2015; Label: Self-released; Format: Digital download, streaming; Track listing: 1. "Fat Chicks"; 2. "Hot For Teacher"; 3. "Little Less Conversation"; 4. "Lost and Found"

==== Studio albums ====
Title	Details
Under the Covers	Released: August 12, 2015; Label: Self-released; Format: Digital download, streaming; Track listing: 1. "Don't Forget Me"; 2. "If I Could Turn Back Time"; 3. "In The Closet"; 4. "Travelin' Thru"; 5. "Basket Case"; 6. "Soldier Of Love"; 7. "True Colors"; 8. "All That Jazz"

=== As featured artist ===
==== Singles ====
Year	Title	Album
2026	"A Twink and a Redhead and a Mother" (Grant & Ash featuring Trisha Paytas)	Non-album single

== Published works ==
- Paytas, Trisha. The History of My Insanity CreateSpace, 2013.
- Paytas, Trisha. Tease CreateSpace, 2014.
- Paytas, Trisha. Curvy and Loving it CreateSpace, 2014.
- Paytas, Trisha. Trisha's 31 Nights of Fright CreateSpace, 2014.
- Paytas, Trisha. 101 Poems About My Ex-Boyfriend Independent, 2019.
- Paytas, Trisha. Crying on the Kitchen Floor: A Memoir, 2026
