= Leftovers (disambiguation) =

Leftovers are the uneaten edible remains of a hot or cold meal.

Leftovers or The Leftovers may also refer to:

== Music ==
=== Groups ===
- The Leftovers (American band), a 2000s punk band from Portland, Maine
- The Leftovers (Australian band), a 1970s punk rock group from Brisbane

=== Albums ===
- Leftovers, a 1997 album by Knut
- The Leftovers (album), a 2003 compilation album by the BoDeans
- The Leftovers EP, a 2003 recording by the American hip hop group Ugly Duckling
- Leftovers, a 2008 album by Johnny Flynn & The Sussex Wit
- Leftovers, a 2011 album by Crease
- Leftovers, a 2011 EP by PS I Love You

== Other uses in arts, entertainment, and media ==
- Leftovers (film), a 2017 Indonesian film
- The Leftovers (novel), a 2011 novel by American author Tom Perrotta
- The Leftovers (TV series), an HBO television series based on Tom Perrotta's novel
- "The Lefovers", a 1986 episode of the Walt Disney anthology television series
- Leftovers (podcast), a podcast hosted by Ethan Klein and Hasan Piker
