= Hakham (surname) =

Hakham (Hebrew: חכם) is a Hebrew-language surname literally meaning hakham, 'wise man'. Notable people with the surname include:

- Amos Hakham (1921–2012), Biblical scholar
- Shimon Hakham (1843–1910), Moroccan rabbi

== See also ==
- Hacmon
- Hakmoun
- Hachmoni
- Hahmi/Hakhmi/Hackmey (חכמי)
