= Social Repose =

American singer and YouTuber (born 1990)

- Born: Richard McLean Giese; February 9, 1990 (age 36)
- Occupations: Singer, songwriter, musician, social media content creator
- Years active: 2011–present
- Musical career
- Genres: Indie pop; art-pop; experimental; avant-pop; a cappella; electronic; emo
- Instruments: Vocals; ukulele; piano; guitar; drums
- Labels: Talent Shoppe; Artery Global

YouTube information
- Channel: SocialRepose
- Years active: 2011–present
- Genres: Music; comedy; commentary
- Subscribers: 1.2 million
- Views: 256 million
- Last updated: September 14, 2025

Social Repose is the stage name of Richard McLean Giese (born February 9, 1990 in Cabin John, MD), an American singer-songwriter, musician, and social media content creator.

Giese attended American University in Washington, D.C. and majored in film production.

Giese began making music in high school and college. Giese has named influences including Modest Mouse, My Chemical Romance, Death Cab for Cutie, Imogen Heap and Twenty One Pilots.

== Early career and YouTube beginnings: 2011-2014 ==
The Social Repose YouTube channel launched April 22, 2011, with a single and video, "Helium House". Paradise, the inaugural Social Repose EP, was announced on Facebook and debuted on Bandcamp May 2, 2011. Additional tracks from the album were posted to YouTube in the following days. Giese posted his first vlog July 9 of that year, introducing himself. Paradise was followed shortly by several additional releases also in the electronic synth pop music style. To support his music, Social Repose played live shows at indie clubs in and around the D.C area. Giese also handed out demos at popular alternative band shows, and posted all of his music online.

Early Social Repose YouTube offerings consisted of original music, vlogs, music videos, and cover songs. He gained some traction and was able to perform locally as an opening act for better known bands, but Giese wasn't finding music to be a self-sustaining career. Drawing inspiration from World of Warcraft characters, Giese decided to create a compelling visual identity, including a feathered headpiece and makeup. Giese posted vlogs detailing the increasingly intricate aesthetic: outfits, makeup, accessories, and even wings.

After upgrading the look, Social Repose began posting covers of songs by Warped Tour-style bands, favoring short samples so that he could easily experiment with several styles. He landed a tour spot opening for Blood on the Dance Floor and some dates on the Grow Wild tour.

== Yalta and Empress: 2015-2019 ==
Social Repose released Yalta in the fall of 2015, choosing the name to signal a new beginning. Giese wanted to make emotionally meaningful music, thus the shift from electronic dance music to experimental indie. He wrote and produced this transitional album, citing Imogen Heap and Twenty One Pilots as big influences. Themes touched on identity and relationships, with softer piano replacing aggressive synth and with melodic, often poetic, vocals.

Social Repose is primarily a solo artist, so touring to support Yalta reduced the time available to upload new musical content. Giese apologized in a tour vlog for the delay, explaining that he managed his own travel, stage load in/load out, and merch, and didn't realize how little free time he would have.

In the fall of 2016, Social Repose released trailers that contained glimpses of an upcoming work, and on Halloween the "Filthy Pride" song and video dropped. The melancholy lyrics touched on relationship and mental health struggles and the accompanying video was a striking monochromatic piece. The following fall, two more video trailers appeared, each followed shortly by the music video debuts for "Villain" and "Empress" respectively. The Empress EP released on the same date as the video, and Social Repose toured to support "Empress" across the US and Europe through late 2019. Continuing Social Repose's shift to alternative music that began with Yalta, Empress featured a dark, atmospheric sound. Giese wrote Empress around the themes in the "Filthy Pride" single because he felt they needed to be talked about.

During this period, Giese was open about struggling with depression and burnout. He spoke about how the pressure to constantly upload and maintain relevance made it difficult to focus on time-intensive creative work like songwriting. Giese shifted Social Repose uploads more towards skits and satire.

== Calamity and beyond: 2020-Present ==
On January 1, 2020, Social Repose posted a video, fading away, which featured Giese reciting the poem "Before the Past Happened" by V. B. Price. 'Calamity', a word in the poem, was also the name of the new Social Repose album. "Me" debuted the next day, a spoken word piece with accompanying concept video. "Malevolent" dropped at the end of the month and the rest of Calamity became available towards the end of March. Calamity's tracks contained existential reflection and contemplated relationships, with some songs being nearly autobiographical in nature. Giese's lyrics drew heavily from both personal experiences, and from the ongoing professional struggle to balance artistic expression with personal well-being.

== Cinematography ==
Examples of Giese's work include the "Nothing Matters" art video series which features simply silence and ambient music, and a spoken word piece titled "These are my pills". Behind-the-scenes videos let viewers understand the depth of preparation and the technical process of creating Social Repose concept videos. Giese lost significant weight for the "Mercy Kill" video, spent 13 hours in and out of acrylic paint-filled bathtubs for "Filthy Pride", and submerged himself in a swimming pool in January for the "Me" spoken word video.

== Singles Discography and Videography ==
Key
Indicates an accompanying concept video.
Indicates an accompanying performance video.
Indicates an accompanying lyric video.

Song	Year
"Angela"	2012
"Don't You Dare Forget the Sun"	2026
"Dry Run"	2023
"Gauze" (acoustic)	2024
"Gauze"	2024
"I Beg for the End"	2018
"I Can’t Sleep”	2015
"I Could Be"	2024
"I Want To Be Happy"	2018
"If You're Thinking of Leaving, You Should"	2015
"If You're Thinking of Leaving, You Shouldn’t"	2015
"Island Of Yours (Redux)"	2022
"Mercy Kill"	2018
"1000 Knives (Day Cycle)"	2025
"1000 Knives (Night Cycle)"	2025
"Sad Song About a Girl Who Isn’t Coming Back "	2020
"Stay Alive"	2018
"This Can’t Be It"	2011
"Windows"	2025

== Cover Songs Discography ==
Song	Original Artist	Year
"A Lack of Color"	Death Cab For Cutie	2014
"A Love Like War"	All Time Low feat. Vic Fuentes	2015
"A Part of Me"	Neck Deep	2024
"Africa"	Toto	2018
"After Dark"	Mr.Kitty	2023
"All Around Me"	Flyleaf	2024
"All I Wanted" ft. Ayalla	Paramore	2016
"All the Things She Said"	t.A.T.u.	2026
"Avalanche"	Bring Me the Horizon	2016
”Back to Friends”	Sombr	2026
"Bad!"	XXXTentacion	2018
"Bad Romance"	Lady Gaga	2026
”Bad Guy”	Billie Eilish	2019
”Basket Case”	Green Day	2017
"Be Happy"	Dixie D'Amelio	2020
"Black Hole Sun"	Soundgarden	2025
"Blackout"	Breathe Carolina	2012
"Bloody Valentine"	Machine Gun Kelly	2020
"Breaking the Habit"	Linkin Park	2025
"Brother"	Falling in Reverse	2015
”Bury a Friend”	Billie Eilish	2019
"Cake"	Melanie Martinez	2016
"Cancer"	My Chemical Romance	2015
"Can't Help Falling in Love"	Elvis Presley	2018
Car Radio"	Twenty One Pilots	2016
Car Radio"	Twenty One Pilots	2015
"Caraphernelia"	Pierce the Veil	2015
Careless Whisper" ft. Anniê	Wham!	2025
”Carousel”	Melanie Martinez	2017
"Cheatercheaterbestfriendeater"	Never Shout Never	2015
"Chemical Prisoner"	Falling in Reverse	2015
"Choke"	I Dont Know How But They Found Me	2020
"Circles"	Pierce the Veil	2016
"Closer"	The Chainsmokers feat. Halsey	2016
"Coffee and Cigarettes" feat. Sounds Like Harmony	Never Shout Never	2015
"Coma White"	Marilyn Manson	2016
"Come Little Children"	Hocus Pocus Soundtrack	2021
"Control"	Halsey	2016
"Control"	Metro Station	2015
"Crazy Kids"	Kesha	2013
"Creep"	Radiohead	2023
"Cry Baby"	Melanie Martinez	2016
"Cute without the E (Cut From The Team)"	Taking Back Sunday	2017
"Daisy"	Ashnikko	2021
"Death Stranding"	Chvrches	2015
"Death of A Bachelor"	Panic! at the Disco	2016
Dear Maria, Count Me In	All Time Low	2015
"Decode"	Paramore	2021
"Die Young"	Kesha	2012
"The Divine Zero"	Pierce the Veil	2015
"Dollhouse"	Melanie Martinez	2016
”Don't Threaten Me with a Good Time”	Panic! at the Disco	2017
"Drama Club"	Melanie Martinez	2019
"Drown"	Bring Me the Horizon	2014
"The Drug In Me is You"	Falling in Reverse	2015
"Emily"	From First To Last	2015
"Emperor's New Clothes"	Panic! at the Disco	2018
"Everything I Wanted"	Billie Eilish	2019
"exile"	Taylor Swift feat. Bon Iver	2020
“Eyes Closed”	Halsey	2017
”Falling Down”	Lil Peep and XXXTentacion	2018
"Famous Last Words"	My Chemical Romance	2015
"Fake Love"	Drake	2017
"Feeling This"	Blink-182	2023
"First Day of My Life"	Bright Eyes	2015
"Follow You" feat. BryanStars	Bring Me the Horizon	2016
"Friday I'm In Love"	The Cure	2023
"Gasoline"	Halsey	2016
"Girls / Girls / Boys"	Panic! at the Disco	2017
"The Gold"	Manchester Orchestra	2022
"Goner"	Twenty One Pilots	2015
"Goodbyes"	Post Malone feat. Young Thug	2019
"Guns for Hands"	Twenty One Pilots	2016
"Hard Times"	Paramore	2017
"Hearts a Mess"	Gotye	2012
"Heathens"	Twenty One Pilots	2017
"Heavy"	Linkin Park	2017
"Helena"	My Chemical Romance	2016
"Here"	Alessia Cara	2016
"Heregoesnothin"	Never Shout Never	2015
”The Hero”	JAM Project	2019
"Hey Ya!"	OutKast	2026
"Hide and Seek"	Imogen Heap	2015
"Hold On Till May"	Pierce the Veil	2015
”Hostage”	Billie Eilish	2018
"House Of Gold"	Twenty One Pilots	2016
"Hurt"	Oliver Tree	2019
“IDGAF"	Dua Lipa	2018
”I Fall Apart”	Post Malone	2018
"i like the way you kiss me"	Artemas	2024
"I Miss You" feat. Johnnie Guilbert	Blink-182	2016
"I Will Wait"	Mumford & Sons	2023
"I'm Low On Gas and You Need a Jacket"	Pierce the Veil	2015
"I'm Low On Gas and You Need a Jacket"	Pierce the Veil	2017
"Illegal"	Pink Pantheress	2025
"In the End"	Black Veil Brides	2013
"Iris"	Goo Goo Dolls	2024
"Just Like You"	Falling in Reverse	2015
"Kelsey"	Metro Station	2011
"Kids In the Dark"	All Time Low	2015
"Kill This Love"	Blackpink	2019
“LA Devotee”	Panic! At the Disco	2017
"Lane Boy"	Twenty One Pilots	2016
"Linger"	The Cranberries	2024
"Little Lion Man"	Mumford & Sons	2022
"Lost Boy"	Ruth B.	2016
"Lost It All"	Black Veil Brides	2015
"Love Me Like You Do"	Ellie Goulding	2015
"Love Yourself"	Justin Bieber	2016
”Lovely”	Billie Eilish and Khalid	2018
”Lowlife”	Poppy	2018
"Lucid Dreams"	Juice Wrld	2023
"Ludens"	Bring Me the Horizon	2019
”Lying Is the Most Fun a Girl Can Have Without Taking Her Clothes Off”	Panic! at the Disco	2018
"Mad Hatter" feat. Jaclyn Glenn	Melanie Martinez	2016
"Mad World"	Tears For Fears	2014
"Make It Right"	BTS feat. Lauv	2019
"Mary On a Cross"	Ghost	2022
"Million Reasons"	Lady Gaga	2016
"Misery Business"	Paramore	2020
"Monster"	Meg & Dia	2024
"Mr. Brightside	The Killers	2018
"Mr. Brightside	The Killers	2025
"Mrs. Potato Head"	Melanie Martinez	2016
”My Blood”	Twenty One Pilots	2018
"My Mother Told Me	Egill Skallagrímsson	2024
“Nico and the Niners”	Twenty One Pilots	2018
"No Time To Die"	Billie Eilish	2020
"The Nobodies"	Marilyn Manson	2015
"Not Good Enough for Truth In Cliche"	Escape the Fate	2014
”Numb”	Linkin Park	2017
"Nurse's Office"	Melanie Martinez	2019
"Ocean Eyes"	Billie Eilish	2018
"On the Brightside"	Never Shout Never	2015
"1x1"	Bring Me the Horizon feat. Nova Twins	2020
“Pacify Her”	Melanie Martinez	2017
”Parents”	Yungblud	2019
"Paris"	The Chainsmokers	2017
"Peaches"	Jack Black	2023
"Photograph"	Ed Sheeran	2015
"Pity Party"	Melanie Martinez	2016
"Popular Monster"	Falling in Reverse	2020
"The Principal"	Melanie Martinez	2020
"Psycho"	Red Velvet	2018
"Pumped Up Kicks"	Foster the People	2022
“Remembering Sunday”	All Time Low	2014
"Ride"	Twenty One Pilots	2016
"Run"	Joji	2020
"Running Up That Hill"	Kate Bush	2022
"Sad!"	XXXTentacion	2018
”Save That Shit”	Lil Peep	2018
"Savior"	Black Veil Brides	2015
"Say Amen (Saturday Night)”	Panic! At the Disco	2018
"Scarborough Fair"	Traditional	2024
”Self Care	Mac Miller	2018
"Sellout"	Never Shout Never	2015
"Seventeen Forever" feat. Johnnie Guilbert	Metro Station	2015
”Shape of You”	Ed Sheeran	2017
"Show and Tell"	Melanie Martinez	2019
”Sign Of the Times”	Harry Styles	2017
”Silhouette”	Kana-Boon	2019
"Situations"	Escape the Fate	2015
"Slow Dancing in the Dark"	Joji	2018
"Somebody That I Used To Know"	Gotye	2023
”Something Just Like This”	The Chainsmokers and Coldplay	2017
"Something's Gotta Give"	All Time Low	2015
Somewhere Over the Rainbow"	Judy Garland	2023
"Sorry"	Justin Bieber	2015
”Starboy”	The Weeknd feat. Daft Punk	2016
"Stay"	The Kid Laroi and Justin Bieber	2021
"Stitches"	Shawn Mendes	2015
"Stressed Out" ft. Ayalla	Twenty One Pilots	2016
"Such Great Heights"	The Postal Service	2012
"Such Small Hands"	La Dispute	2015
"Sugar, We're Goin Down" feat. Fairlane	Fall Out Boy	2025
"Summertime Sadness"	Lana Del Rey	2013
"Supermassive Black Hole"	Muse	2016
"Sweatshirt"	Jacob Sartorius	2016
"Sympathy Is a Knife"	Charli XCX	2026
"Tag, You're It"	Melanie Martinez	2016
"Take Me to Church"	Hozier	2015
"Teenage Dirtbag"	Wheatus	2024
"Test Drive"	Joji	2018
"Text Me"	Lil Peep feat. Era	2019
"The Night We Met"	Lord Huron	2026
"Therapy"	All Time Low	2015
"This Is Halloween"	The Nightmare Before Christmas Soundtrack	2022
"Throne"	Bring Me the Horizon	2015
"Time To Dance" ft. Jordan Sweeto	Panic! at the Disco	2015
"Toes"	Lights	2012
"Trailer Trash"	Modest Mouse	2011
"Trailer Trash"	Modest Mouse	2011
"Truce"	Twenty One Pilots	2015
"True Friends"	Bring Me the Horizon	2015
"Unholy"	Sam Smith feat. Kim Petras	2022
"Unravel"	Toru Kitajima	2019
"Valhalla Calling"	Miracle of Sound	2023
"VOID"	Melanie Martinez	2023
"We Don't Believe What's on TV"	Twenty One Pilots	2016
"We Don't Have To Dance"	Andy Black	2016
"The Weekend"	Millionaires	2014
”Weight of the World”	Nier: Automata Soundtrack	2019
"Welcome To the Internet"	Bo Burnham	2021
"Wellerman"	Traditional	2023
"WAP"	Cardi B	2020
"We'll Fall Together"	Austin Jones	2015
"What Is Love?"	Never Shout Never	2013
”When the Party’s Over”	Billie Eilish	2018
"Wheels On the Bus"	Melanie Martinez	2019
"Wish You Were Gay"	Billie Eilish	2019
"Wrecking Ball"	Miley Cyrus	2023
”You Should See Me in a Crown”	Billie Eilish	2018
"Zombie"	The Cranberries	2022

== Albums and EPs ==
Paradise
No.	Title	Length
1.	"Red Velvet Room"	2:04
2.	"Helium House"	3:41
3.	"Circumstances"	3:51
4.	"MWWMTB"	3:48
5.	"Barrel and the Trigger"	5:09
6.	"Perforated Heart"	4:46
7.	"Lifted"	4:15
8.	"Barrel and the Trigger (acoustic)"	3:02
Total length:		30:36

More Of the Same
No.	Title	Length
1.	"Ambiguity"	3:54
2.	"Mother Winter"	4:21
3.	"Mystery Girl"	3:24
4.	"WC Treason"	4:25
5.	"Low"	4:54
6.	"Time Is Killing Me"	4:03
7.	"Mystery Girl (acoustic)"	3:00
Total length:		28:01

The Modern Age
No.	Title	Length
1.	"Battle City"	3:53
2.	"Little Panther"	3:59
3.	"Modern Age"	4:00
4.	"Save the Girl"	3:56
5.	"Semantics"	4:41
6.	"Family Portrait"	1:14
7.	"Barrel and the Trigger"	3:38
8.	"Autumn Ashes"	4:42
9.	"A New Chapter..."	3:48
Total length:		33:51

The Machine That Learned How To Love
No.	Title	Length
1.	"Mr. Grumpy Gills"	1:33
2.	"The Sane Life"	3:56
3.	"Machine"	4:31
4.	"Float Away"	4:49
Total length:		14:49

Reckless Closure
No.	Title	Length
1.	"Be Brave"	2:50
2.	"Reckless Closure"	4:24
3.	"Beautiful Disaster"	3:24
4.	"Raise Your Fist"	2:57
5.	"I Remember When..."	3:03
6.	"New World"	4:05
7.	"Cannonball"	3:37
8.	"Floor Boards"	4:42
9.	"The Architect"	5:13
Total length:		33:03

Crazy Manic Love
No.	Title	Length
1.	"Crazy Manic Love"	3:46
2.	"More"	4:24
3.	"Wither"	3:49
4.	"I Will Kill Your Sadness"	2:28
5.	"Temptress"	3:26
6.	"Sellouts (Social Repose Remix)" (Breathe Carolina cover)	3:58
Total length:		21:51

Covers
No.	Title	Length
1.	"Drown" (Bring Me the Horizon)	3:05
2.	"Remembering Sunday" (All Time Low)	3:50
3.	"Not Good Enough For Truth In Cliche" (Escape the Fate)	3:14
4.	"Bulletproof Love" (Pierce the Veil)	0:29
5.	"Let It Go" (Frozen soundtrack)	0:45
6.	"Anaconda" (Nicki Minaj)	1:27
7.	"I Will Follow You Into the Dark" (Death Cab For Cutie)	1:51
8.	"Time Travel" (Never Shout Never)	1:44
9.	"A Whole New World" (Aladdin soundtrack)	1:00
Total length:		17:25

Yalta
No.	Title	Length
1.	"Stand Tall"	3:53
2.	"Arctic Eyes"	4:06
3.	"Island Of Yours"	3:14
4.	"Bipolar Love"	3:42
5.	"Tail Lights"	3:18
6.	"Echo Fades"	3:44
7.	"Demons"	3:51
8.	"The Maw"	3:54
Total length:		29:42

Empress
No.	Title	Length
1.	"Empress"	3:34
2.	"Villain"	3:59
3.	"Filthy Pride"	4:01
4.	"Chemistry"	3:16
5.	"Mother"	3:20
6.	"Behave"	4:03
Total length:		22:13

Calamity
No.	Title	Length
1.	"Me"	3:15
2.	"With Teeth"	2:24
3.	"XO"	4:06
4.	"What Will You Do When I'm Gone"	2:54
5.	"Is This Love?"	3:43
6.	"Malevolent"	2:53
7.	"Everyone's a Narcissist"	3:05
8.	"Her Tears Are Not Clean"	3:29
9.	"Bleak"	2:02
10.	"Blood In the Water"	3:30
11.	"Straight Into the Sun"	2:37
Total length:		33:28

== Guest Appearances ==
2021: appeared in videos for Sadboy2005, a Trisha Paytas project.

2021: Lent vocals to "Villains", a K-popK/DA cover by MasterAndross also ft. Kuraiinu, Hyurno, & Will Stetson

2023: Performed on the hook of "My Way" from the Tom MacDonald and Adam Calhoun album The Brave 2 (2023).

2024: Guested onstage for "The Kill" with 30 Seconds to Mars at the iHeartRadio ALTerEGO concert on January 24 in Anaheim.

== Concert Tours ==
- Reckoning Tour (2014)
- Grow Wild Tour (2015)
- Yalta Tour (2016)
- Somewhere Before Christmas Tour (2016)
- Empress Tour (2017–2018)
- Twenty-Ninescene Tour (2019)

== Filmography ==
- Shane and Friends (2017)
- The Skeptic's Guide to Wellness (2017)
- The Andy Show (2017)
