= Moses Hacmon =

Israeli photographer (born 1977)

- משה חכמון
- Born: October 29, 1977 (age 48); Tel Aviv, Israel
- Education: Southern California Institute of Architecture (BArch)
- Occupations: Artist; designer; photographer; podcaster
- Notable work: Faces of Water
- Spouse: Trisha Paytas (m. 2021)
- Children: 3
- Relatives: Hila Hacmon Klein (sister)
- Website: facesofwater.com

Moses Hacmon (Hebrew: משה חכמון; born October 29, 1977) is an Israeli collaborative artist, designer and photographer. He is best known for his work Faces of Water, a photography project focused on capturing the movement of water, and for co-hosting the Just Trish Podcast with his wife, Trisha Paytas.

== Biography ==
Hacmon was born in Tel Aviv, Israel. Before immigrating to the US in 2002, he spent a year and a half in flight school for the Israeli Air Force. He studied cinematography and fine art at the Avni Institute of Art and Design and attended the Technion – Israel Institute of Technology. In 2006, he completed his Bachelor of Architecture from the Southern California Institute of Architecture with AIA honors.

After two divorces, he married American internet personality Trisha Paytas in December 2021, after being introduced to her by his brother in law and Paytas’ co-host, Ethan Klein. The couple currently lives in Los Angeles. In February 2022, Paytas announced that she was pregnant with her first child. In November 2023, Paytas announced that she was pregnant with her second child. In 2025 they welcomed their third child and only son.

== Photography career ==
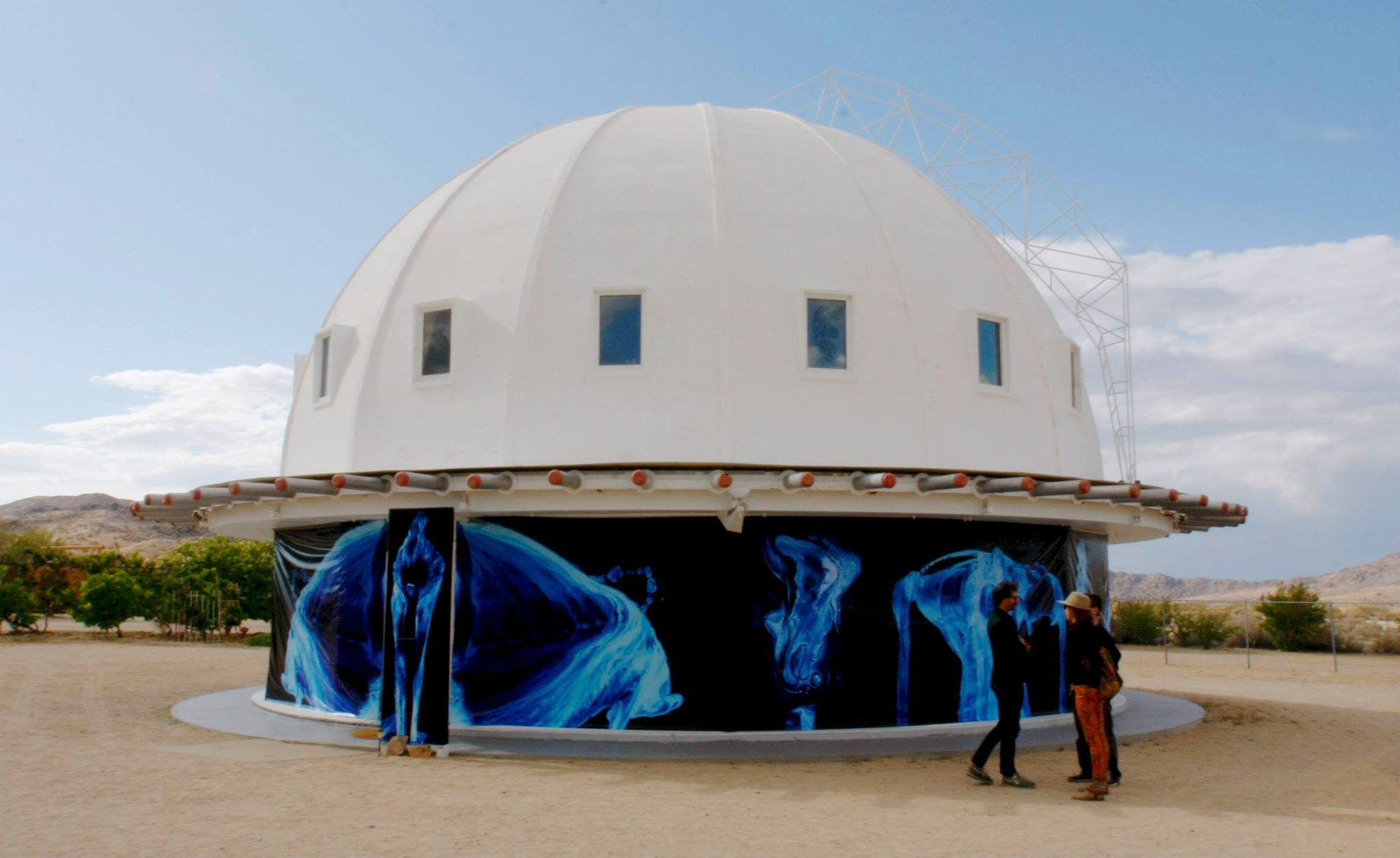
Hacmon's series Faces of Water being exhibited at Joshua Tree National Park in 2015 at The Joshua Treenial.

A central focus of Hacmon's career has been the study of water's composition, properties, and movement, which led him to develop a photographic technique, Faces of Water.

Inspired by movement of water, Hacmon uses nano-film technology to capture water's invisible forms. Kyle VanHemert of Wired explains Hacmon's technique uses a special type of film with a layer of liquid iron that "records the movement of the water itself".

In an interview with VoyageLA, Hacmon describes Faces of Water, as "part art, part science, part spiritual awakening." In 2013, Hacmon's art exhibition Faces of Water was first displayed by The Hub LA, in the Arts District in Downtown Los Angeles.
