= Leftovers (podcast) =

Leftist political podcast

- Genre: Comedy; Politics
- Country of origin: United States
- Language: English

Cast and voices
- Hosted by: Ethan Klein; Hasan Piker

Production
- Length: 95–231 minutes

Publication
- No. of episodes: 61
- Original release: September 26, 2021 – October 12, 2023

Leftovers was an American leftist political podcast hosted by Ethan Klein and Hasan Piker on the H3 Podcast. It was focused on politics and internet culture. Klein stated that "the spirit of this show is not serious policy debate. It's bringing righteous justice to these shit-bags [and] clowning on idiots".

The series featured guests such as Amouranth, Liver King, and Andrew Callaghan as well as commentators such as Marxian economist Richard D. Wolff.

== History ==
The series debuted on September 26, 2021, and was hosted on the H3 Podcast YouTube channel and other podcast platforms. The show was a successor to Klein's previous podcast Frenemies, which ended in July 2021. Tubefilter reported that the first episode reached 1 million views a day after being published.

Prior to the start of the podcast, Klein and Piker had collaborated before. In August 2020, Piker was featured as a guest on episode No. 207 of the H3 Podcast. In July 2021, Klein and Piker joined to debate streamers xQc and Trainwreckstv on the ethics of promoting gambling to their audiences. Piker stated that, after the debate with the streamers, he knew he and Klein would make a show together eventually.

In October 2022, episode 29 of the podcast (titled "Ethan Is Cancelled For Ben Shapiro Joke & Midterm Special Coverage – Leftovers #29") was removed from YouTube when the channel received a week-long ban. The episode is still available on podcast platforms.

On October 12, 2023, Klein and Piker hosted an episode devoted to discussing the October 7 attacks and their ramifications in the context of the broader Israeli–Palestinian conflict. Shortly afterward, the podcast went on hiatus indefinitely.

== See also ==
- H3 Podcast
