= Hasan Piker =

American political commentator (born 1991)

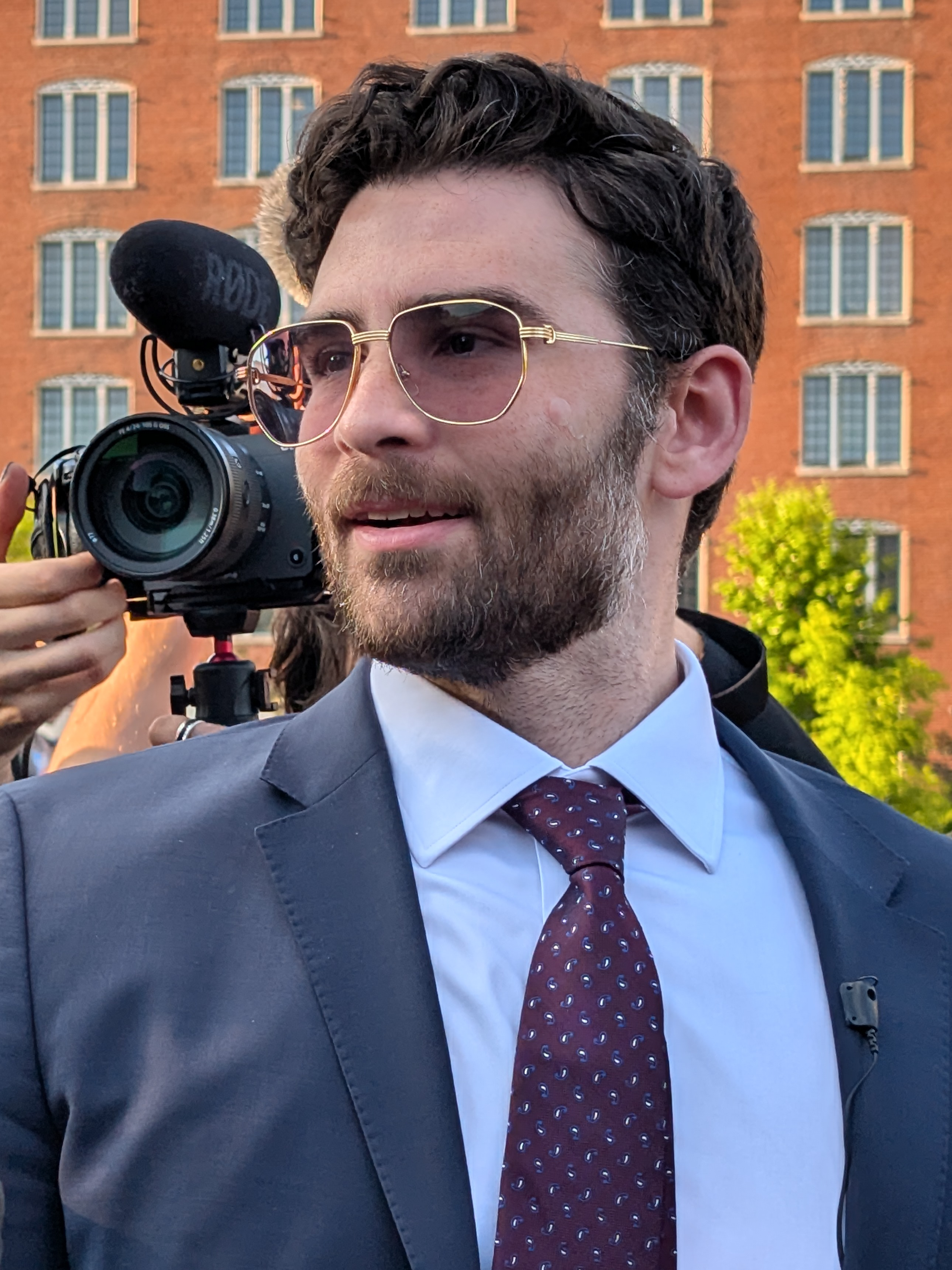
- Piker in 2026
- Born: Hasan Doğan Piker; July 25, 1991 (age 35); New Brunswick, New Jersey, U.S.
- Other name: HasanAbi
- Education: Rutgers University (BA)
- Occupations: Twitch streamer; Political activist; Political commentator
- Relatives: Cenk Uygur (uncle)

Twitch information
- Channel: HasanAbi
- Years active: 2018–present
- Genres: Political commentary; reaction; gaming
- Followers: 3.1 million

YouTube information
- Channel: HasanAbi
- Years active: 2015–present
- Genres: Political commentary; Social commentary
- Subscribers: 2 million
- Views: 1.338 billion
- Last updated: October 26, 2026

Hasan Doğan Piker (Note: English: /ˈpaɪkər/ PY-kər; Turkish: [haˈsan doˈan piˈcæɾ].) (born July 25, 1991), known online as HasanAbi, (Note: Abi is Turkish for "elder brother", so literally "Elder brother Hasan".) is an American left-wing political commentator, activist, Twitch streamer, and influencer. He began streaming on Twitch in March 2018, while working at The Young Turks (TYT), leaving the network in 2020 to focus full-time on his streaming career. His broadcasts combine current affairs commentary, political debates, and international news with gameplay and reaction content. As of 2026, Piker's channel ranks among the most-subscribed Twitch accounts.

Piker has been called a prominent and controversial voice of the American Left in digital media, using his platform to comment on U.S. politics and foreign policy, particularly through his criticism of Israel and coverage of the Gaza war. He has also engaged in offline political mobilization, campaigning for progressive candidates.

== Early life and education ==
Hasan Doğan Piker was born on July 25, 1991, in New Brunswick, New Jersey, to Turkish Muslim parents. He has said that he grew up mostly in Istanbul and Ankara, adding that he was surrounded by Muslim culture. He describes himself today as culturally Muslim but not an avid follower of the faith. In Turkey, Piker attended the private TED Ankara Koleji, then a public school, and finally Bilkent Laboratory and International School.

According to Piker, his father's family emigrated to Turkey from Thessaloniki and Crete. His father, Mehmet Behçet Piker, is a political scientist and economist who was a board member and vice president of the Turkish financial conglomerate Sabancı Holding and is a founding member of Turkey's conservative Future Party. His mother, Ülker Sedef Piker (née Uygur), is an art and architectural historian who teaches at the New Jersey Institute of Technology. His uncle Cenk Uygur is a political commentator and co-founder of The Young Turks (TYT), a left-wing news network.

After graduating from high school, Piker returned to the United States and attended the University of Miami, then transferred to Rutgers University, where he joined the Theta Delta Chi fraternity. In 2013, he graduated cum laude from Rutgers with a double major in political science and communication studies.

== Career ==
=== 2013–2019: The Young Turks and early Twitch career ===
During his senior year of college in 2013, Piker interned for The Young Turks. The network's ad sales and business department hired him after he graduated. Piker said this would make him a "nepo baby" but believed "those types of advantages don't matter" in "a perfect society". He asked to host the show when a fill-in was needed and later became a host and producer.

In 2016, Piker created and hosted The Breakdown, a TYT Network video series that aired on Facebook and presented left-leaning political analyses targeted, at the time, at millennial supporters of presidential candidate Bernie Sanders. Piker also contributed political content to HuffPost from 2016 to 2018.

Piker started streaming on Twitch on March 23, 2018, while working at TYT. Piker said he shifted his attention from Facebook to Twitch to reach a younger audience and because of what he saw as a preponderance of right-wing commentators on YouTube and a lack of leftist representation among streamers. He became a popular left-wing political commentator and was invited to appear on KTTV's The Issue Is and the political podcast Chapo Trap House. Piker also streams gameplay and commentary on video games. Sometimes he role-plays as "Hank Pecker", an ethno-political caricature of a "right-wing redneck".

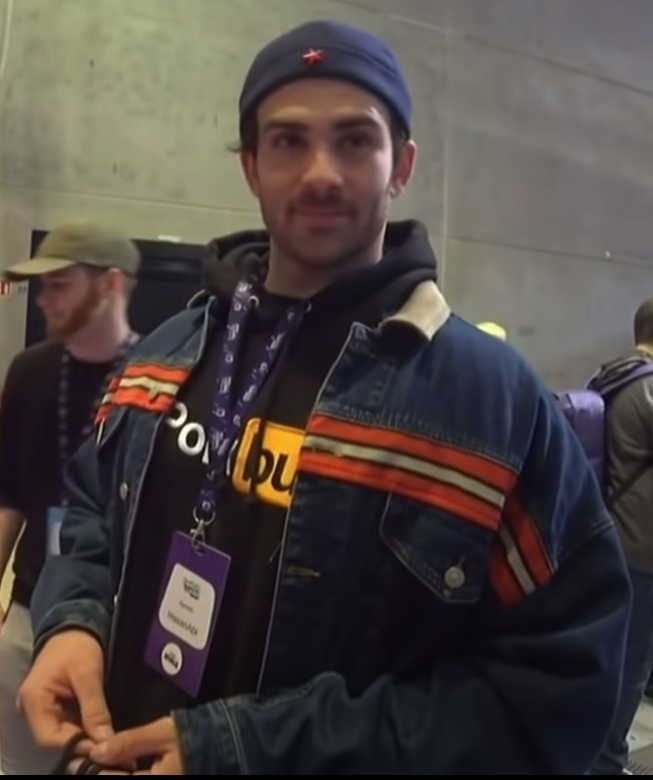
Piker in 2019

During a Twitch stream in August 2019, Piker criticized American foreign policy and made controversial comments about the September 11 attacks, including "America deserved 9/11." Piker called his comments satirical and said U.S. foreign policy made an event like 9/11 possible but acknowledged that he should have used "more precise" language. Piker received a one-week ban from Twitch for his comments.

=== 2020–2025: Twitch and political commentary ===
In January 2020, Piker left TYT to focus on his career as a Twitch streamer, becoming further established on the platform. His livestreams usually include discussions of current affairs and lifestyle stories, playing video games, reacting to memes and media clips, and interacting with his viewers. Piker has mobilized his followers to "ratio" opponents, including conservative influencers and Republican politicians. According to researchers, "Piker's streams provide many young people with a sense of community, acceptance, [and] place", and "figures like Piker have a critical role to play in moving young people away from both the 'red pill'—online right-wing and misogynist discourse—and the 'black pill'—online discourses of hopelessness and nihilism."

In October 2020, U.S. Representative Alexandria Ocasio-Cortez collaborated with Piker and fellow Twitch streamer Pokimane to organize a stream of Ocasio-Cortez playing the popular multiplayer game Among Us for the "Get out the vote" initiative for the then-upcoming presidential election. The stream aired the next day, featuring both Ocasio-Cortez and U.S. Representative Ilhan Omar playing the game with Piker and other popular Twitch streamers, reaching a total concurrent viewership of almost 700,000.

During the first 2020 United States presidential debate in September, over 125,000 viewers watched Piker's commentary on the stream, the highest viewership for the debate on Twitch. Piker's stream covering the results of the 2020 United States presidential election peaked at 230,000 concurrent viewers and was the sixth most-watched source of election coverage on YouTube or Twitch, comprising 4.9% of the market share. He was the most-watched Twitch streamer during the election week; his 80 hours of streams were viewed for a cumulative 6.8 million hours by an average of 75,000 concurrent viewers. Piker's stream reached a new high of 231,000 viewers during the January 6 United States Capitol attack.

Piker (left) with fellow streamers Ludwig Ahgren (center) and xQc (right) in 2021

Since 2021, Piker has hosted the podcast Fear& (formerly Fear&Malding) alongside his friend and fellow Twitch streamer Will Neff. Streamers QTCinderella and AustinShow joined the podcast as co-hosts in 2022. From September 2021 to October 2023, Piker also co-hosted the left-leaning political podcast Leftovers with Ethan Klein.

In December 2021, Piker was banned from Twitch for a week after using the slur "cracker" in reference to white people, after two of his chat moderators were banned for using it. He argued the term should not be considered a slur since a person using it is "powerless" and would be "doing it as someone who has been historically oppressed blowing off steam." A paper in New Media & Society criticized Twitch for punishing Piker while epithets aimed at minority groups were prevalent on the platform.

Piker's YouTube channel, which features highlights of his streams, reached over 1,000,000 subscribers in 2022.

Piker was given credentialed access and livestreamed at the 2024 Democratic National Convention, and his 2024 election night coverage stream had 7.5 million viewers.

In February 2025, Piker said that if Republicans "cared about Medicare fraud or Medicaid fraud, [they] would kill Rick Scott", in a reference to Scott's involvement in Medicare and Medicaid fraud when he was the CEO of Columbia/HCA. Twitch banned Piker for 24 hours in March for the comment. In May, Twitch banned Piker for 24 hours for "improper handling of terrorist propaganda" after he showed a manifesto allegedly by Elias Rodriguez, the perpetrator of the 2025 Capital Jewish Museum shooting.

In May 2025, Piker was detained for around two hours by U.S. Customs and Border Protection at O'Hare International Airport in Chicago after returning from a trip to France. According to Piker, the officials who questioned him during his detention knew who he was and asked him detailed questions about his views on Donald Trump, Israel, Houthi rebels, Hamas, and his Twitch bans. Piker believed he was detained due to his political views and that his detention was part of the Trump administration's intimidation tactics to silence political opposition. Assistant Secretary of the United States Department of Homeland Security Tricia McLaughlin accused Piker of "lying for likes" and said it was a routine inspection that any traveler could be subjected to.

==== Fundraisers ====
During the Russian invasion of Ukraine, Piker, in partnership with CARE International, raised over $200,000 for Ukrainian humanitarian aid while playing Elden Ring, with an average of over 70,000 people watching his coverage of the conflict.

In the aftermath of the 2023 Turkey–Syria earthquake, Piker organized a fundraiser that was also contributed to and promoted by other streamers and content creators, including Jacksepticeye, Valkyrae, Ludwig Ahgren, and IShowSpeed. As of February 10, 2023, the fundraiser had raised over $1,200,000 for charities such as CARE International's Turkish and Syrian branches, as well as two Turkish NGOs: the AKUT Search and Rescue Association and Ahbap, which was founded by Turkish musician Haluk Levent.

During the Gaza war, Piker's charity drive on his channel had raised over $1,000,000 as of October 21, 2023, for the Palestine Children's Relief Fund, American Near East Refugee Aid, Medical Aid for Palestinians, and the Palestine Red Crescent Society.

=== 2025–present: Campaign activity ===
In 2025, Piker began campaigning for political candidates. Piker has appeared with political candidates during campaigns that sought support from popular internet personalities to reach voters online. He has also supported candidates online. Piker said he was "very clear" that he was not "some socialist kingmaker", believing the media was not "that powerful".

In the 2025 New York City mayoral election, Piker expressed support for Zohran Mamdani, and Mamdani appeared on Piker's stream. During the campaign, Mamdani's political opponents used Piker's past remarks, especially his 2019 comment that "America deserved 9/11", in attacks against Mamdani, including in a televised advertisement aired by a pro-Andrew Cuomo super PAC. Mamdani disavowed Piker's comments during a mayoral debate, calling them "objectionable and reprehensible".

During a March 2026 livestream, Piker helped raise more than $56,000 for congressional candidate Oliver Larkin. Wired called this an example of content creators using their online influence for direct fundraising.

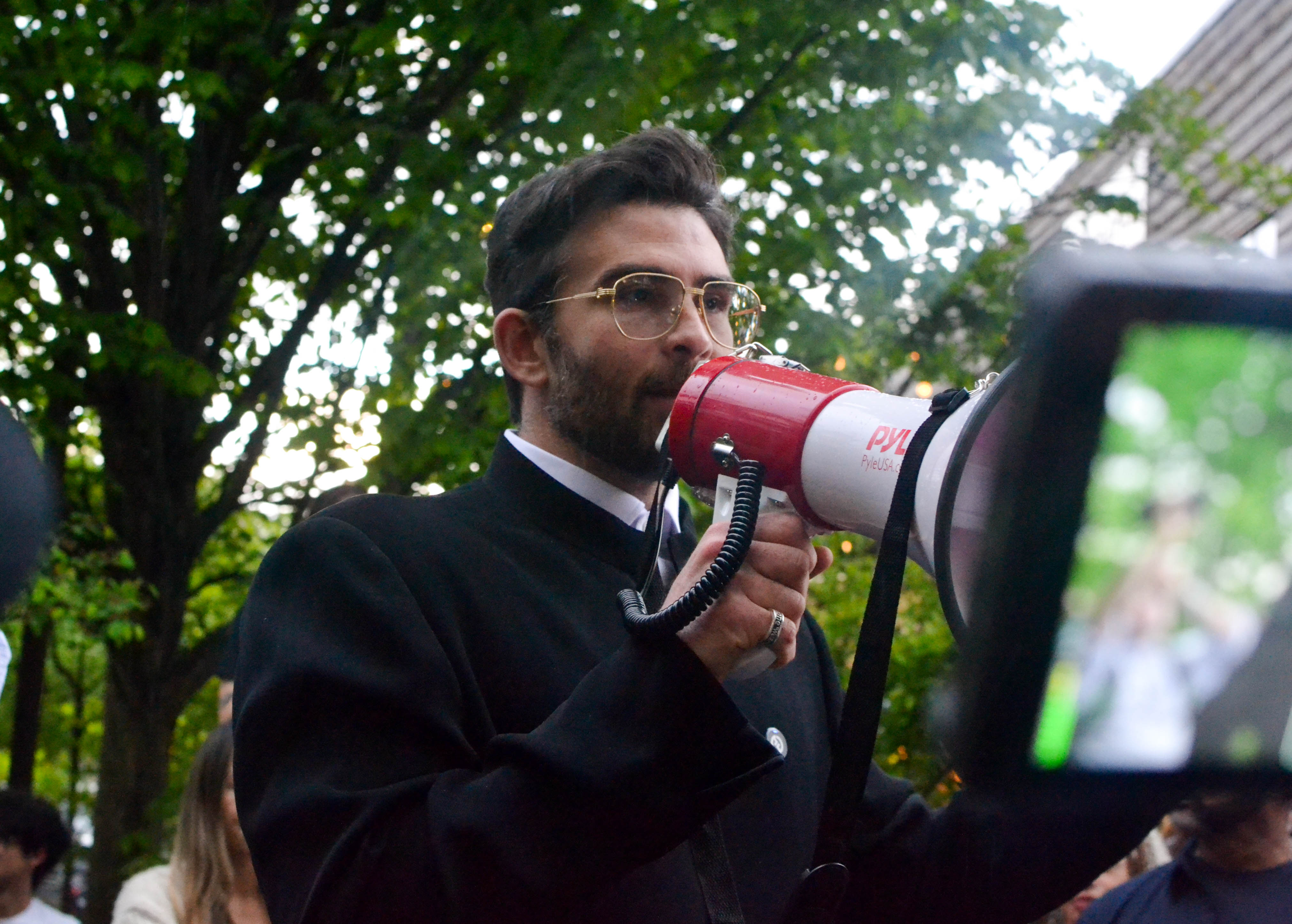
Piker speaking at a rally for Chris Rabb in West Philadelphia in 2026

Piker rallied in Philadelphia with state representative Chris Rabb during the 2026 primary for Pennsylvania's 3rd congressional district, which Rabb went on to win in May. Piker also campaigned for and hosted Adam Hamawy on stream during his run in New Jersey's 12th congressional district. Hamawy won his primary in June. Another congressional candidate Piker endorsed, hosted, and campaigned for, Saikat Chakrabarti, finished third in the nonpartisan primary for California's 11th congressional district, failing to advance to the general election.

In June 2026, Piker was refused entry to the UK alongside Cenk Uygur, which he argued was "due to my criticism of Israel". The UK Home Office said the decision was due to Piker's "potential risk" and because his presence "may not be conducive to the public good". Free speech activists criticized the decision. He had been invited to speak at the Oxford Union and SXSW London. The Oxford Union said Piker would deliver his speech via livestream. Piker said the decision showed the "fascist" direction the "Western world" was taking.

Ahead of the 2026 Democratic primaries for the House of Representatives in New York, Piker campaigned at a June event in Bushwick, Brooklyn, for Claire Valdez and Darializa Avila Chevalier, who went on to win the Democratic nominations in New York's 7th and 13th districts, respectively. That same month, Piker hosted Melat Kiros on his stream ahead of her primary challenge to Diana DeGette in Colorado's 1st congressional district. Kiros defeated DeGette in her primary.

During the 2026 Democratic Party primaries in Michigan, Piker campaigned for Democratic candidate Abdul El-Sayed. Two of El-Sayed's opponents, Mallory McMorrow and Haley Stevens, criticized Piker's involvement based on past remarks, particularly about the Israeli–Palestinian conflict. Democratic State Representative Carrie Rheingans chose not to participate in the event with Piker while continuing to support El-Sayed. Piker's involvement in the Michigan primary became a source of division within the Democratic Party. El-Sayed won the primary. Piker also campaigned with Donavan McKinney, who defeated incumbent Shri Thanedar in the August primary for Michigan's 13th congressional district. That month, former Missouri congresswoman Cori Bush, who had campaigned with Piker at a May Day rally in St. Louis, lost her bid for the Democratic nomination in Missouri's 1st congressional district to her successor, Wesley Bell.

On August 11, 2026, conservative political commentator Scott Jennings played a video clip on his podcast, The Scott Jennings Show, in which Piker is heard to say, "Can we go back to a better time when lynchings were happening?". The same day, Jennings posted a link to the video on X, writing that Piker "says the USA should resume lynchings against black people". The video had been edited so as to make it appear that those were Piker's own words, when Piker had in fact been sarcastically paraphrasing someone else's comments. In response, Piker sued Jennings for defamation on October 25, 2026, in the US District Court for the District of Columbia, seeking $27.5 million in compensatory damages and $45 million in punitive damages.

== Views and political beliefs ==
Piker has been described as socialist, leftist, progressive, and far-left. He has been called a controversial political commentator. Piker describes himself as a socialist. Piker is a frequent critic of U.S. mainstream politics, Israel, and the Gaza war.

In a 2025 The New York Times interview, Piker described himself as a Marxist, socialist, and leftist. In a later interview with The New York Times, when asked whether his preferred alternative to liberalism was Marxist, Piker said he did not have a "perfect solution", but that moving toward socialism would be a "wonderful start". Piker has rejected characterizations of himself as a Maoist, saying that both Maoists and Marxist–Leninists have criticized his political views.

Piker has cited his upbringing in Turkey under the premiership of Recep Tayyip Erdoğan as an influence on both his left-wing views and willingness to speak out about them. He has mentioned Amy Goodman, Jon Stewart, Aaron McGruder, and Bill Burr as influences on the content and style of his streams.

=== American politics ===
Andrew Marantz of The New Yorker described Piker as anti-Trump but "hardly a loyal Democrat". Instead, Marantz classified Piker as an "old-school leftist", not a liberal, who is critical of the "American empire". Piker said his goal was to push the Democratic Party to be more progressive. Intelligencer called Piker "the AOC of Twitch".

Piker has advocated for workplace democracy, universal health care, LGBTQ+ rights, and gun control. Piker has argued that many conservatives have been "socially conditioned" by pro-corporate and pro-imperial media and politics, and that they can be won over to the Democrats by offering generous social-welfare programs such as Medicare for All without first challenging their socially conservative beliefs. He has spoken in favor of sewer socialism, a brand of socialism that wins over the population by building municipal-owned infrastructure. Piker has cited the Tennessee Valley Authority and the provision of broadband internet by EPB of Chattanooga as something that should be rolled out across the United States.

Piker supported the presidential primary campaigns of Bernie Sanders in 2016 and 2020, and has been an outspoken critic of both the Democratic and Republican parties. Piker opposed Donald Trump's travel ban in 2017. After Luigi Mangione—the suspect in the killing of Brian Thompson, the CEO of UnitedHealthcare—was arrested, Piker "celebrat[ed] Mangione as 'hotter than me' and [spoke] in generally exalted terms about 'the propaganda of the deed'" on his stream but avoided breaking Twitch's terms of service rules about glorification of violence. Citing Friedrich Engels, Piker later said that Thompson had committed social murder.

=== Israel and Palestine ===
Piker has been described as anti-Zionist and has criticized Israel and Zionism. Piker has called himself "an outspoken advocate for Palestinian emancipation".

In May 2024, Piker described allegations of Hamas carrying out sexual violence during the October 7 attacks as "rape fantasies" and "rape hallucinations". Piker has also said, "It doesn't matter if rape happened on October 7th. It doesn't change the dynamic for me". In an April 2026 interview with The New Republic, Piker said of the quotation: "I think it's very clear what I was saying. I was debating someone at the time about there being sexual violence that occurred on October 7th. And I said sexual violence does take place in situations like this, and there was definitely testimony of sexual violence that had taken place amongst the hostages. But that doesn't change the dynamic of Israel committing a genocide against the Palestinians, and my opposing that genocide".

In November 2024, Congressman Ritchie Torres criticized Twitch for alleged "amplification of antisemitism" and called for an investigation into Piker. A campaign by various commentators pressured advertisers to leave Twitch due to the alleged platforming of antisemitism, including Piker's political commentary on the conflict. Both Torres and the pressure campaign posted clips of Piker's channel they alleged were antisemitic. Piker said the clips were taken out of context and showed him criticizing Israel, not Jewish people. Because of the controversy, some advertisers pulled advertisements from Twitch.

Piker called some far-right Haredi Jews in Israel "inbred". He later said the term was "a pejorative against ethno-religious and racial supremacists of all different varieties. It has nothing to do with Judaism". In another interview, he said he regretted using it in reference to ultra-Orthodox Jews.

In January 2026, Piker said "Hamas is a thousand times better than a fascist settler colonial apartheid state" (referring to Israel) and that he "would vote for Hamas over Israel every single time", statements he stood by in April 2026 during interviews with Pod Save America and The New Republic. He told The New Republic, "Hamas didn't do a genocide. Israel did", referring to the Gaza genocide.

In August 2026, Piker warned that associating American Jews with support for Israel could lead to violent backlash against them. Piker claimed that pro-Israel Jewish leaders conflate Jewish identity with support for Israel, and that anger at Israel can fuel antisemitism and endanger American Jews. The comments caused some division within the Democratic Party amid the 2026 Michigan Senate election, with candidate Abdul El-Sayed said to have "distanced himself" from Piker amid the fallout.

=== Authoritarianism ===
In 2021, Piker said he became interested in politics after Recep Tayyip Erdoğan sued a cartoonist for depicting him as a cat, which Piker considered "suppression of freedom". GQ described Piker as "fighting back" against authoritarianism through livestreaming. In the profile, Piker said Donald Trump could "take out or erode" constitutional protections, including "due process, birthright citizenship, and the First Amendment", before rebuilding the legal system to advance what Piker called a "white nativist agenda". In an October 2025 interview with Morning Edition, Piker said he worried that if the Trump administration succeeded in suppressing speech it deemed unacceptable, the United States would "end up in an authoritarian nightmare" in which "one of the last bastions of liberalism is eroded". In April 2026, during a debate at the Yale Political Union, Piker positioned himself against the "dying American Empire". He said capitalism had built things worth keeping, but that those things had been built through labor and the benefits had not been evenly distributed. Piker concluded, "If a dictatorship is inevitable, I'd rather have it be a dictatorship of the proletariat."

Regarding international affairs, writers in The Atlantic, The Dispatch, and New Lines Magazine have characterized Piker as sympathizing with left-wing authoritarian governments, saying that he expressed admiration for China as his preferred model of socialism, likened China's absorption of Tibet to the Union's defeat of the Confederacy, called Uyghur detention facilities "re-education camps", called Mao Zedong "one of the great leaders of this world", and called the collapse of the Soviet Union "one of the greatest catastrophes of the 20th century". Both The Atlantic and The Dispatch have also said that Piker's worldview leans toward "broad sympathy for China, Cuba, Russia, and authoritarianism in general", while New York has stated that Piker holds "romantic and credulous attitudes about repressive regimes abroad". Vox argued that the best label for Piker's international relations stance is campism (a position that judges foreign movements and regimes more by their degree of hostility toward the West than by their values), and outlined a series of positions Piker holds that point to campism, such as his stated "lack of issue" with Hezbollah and support for Mao despite the Great Leap Forward's death toll, something Vox set against Piker's stated position that regimes should be judged by how many civilians they kill.

=== Russian invasion of Ukraine ===
During the February prelude to the 2022 Russian invasion of Ukraine, Piker said Russia would not attack. Piker apologized, saying he "didn't think a regional power would act so irrationally. I've admitted my mistakes. I got things wrong." He has said that the U.S. paved the way for the invasion and compared Russia's invasion with the U.S.'s history of invasions.

=== China ===
In November 2025, Piker visited China and appeared on the state-run China Global Television Network, saying he wanted to see what the U.S. could "adopt and emulate" from China. He called the trip a "dream come true". During a livestream at Tiananmen Square, police briefly questioned him after a ceremony, an interaction that attracted media attention. During the trip, Piker displayed a copy of Mao Zedong's Little Red Book, which he said he had received as a gift and called "really, really special".

In a December 2025 interview, Piker said, "Regardless of its flaws, and repressive attitudes towards certain groups and whatnot, they have done a phenomenal achievement in greatly improving the material conditions of the average Chinese person".

In a September 2026 interview with Axios, Piker said China is the closest government model to what he would like to see adopted in the U.S. He said he was concerned that Chinese children could have better living conditions than U.S. children in the next decade or two.

== Reception ==
Piker has been called Twitch's "de facto political commentator" who uses an unabashedly ideological framing. With about 3 million Twitch followers, he has emerged as a prominent commentator among young American leftists since 2025, largely due to his critiques of the Trump administration. Outlets dedicated to video game culture and youth culture have covered Piker's streams favorably. In particular, journalists have noted his ability to "combine information and entertainment", and to approach left-wing political coverage in a way that is relatable and accessible to Twitch viewers, who may feel out of touch with cable news. Some authors also cite Piker's vulgar, animated style of expression and physical appearance as notable factors in his popularity. Piker has called his style of broadcasting "agitative propaganda" and "Rush Limbaugh for Zoomers". Several publications have compared him to radio "shock jocks". Some sources have called Piker a member of the dirtbag left, a left-wing populist style of politics known for vulgarity.

A 2022 chapter in Cultures of Authenticity discussed Piker and The Young Turks as case studies of alternative political commentary. The authors said Piker participates with his audience in an ambivalent "post-authentic" subculture that uses antagonism, jokes, and irony to communicate political views indirectly. Both Andrew Marantz of The New Yorker and Michelle Goldberg of The New York Times have called Piker "jejune". Marantz wrote that Piker was always "trying to reduce any societal problem to a one-word culprit, usually 'capitalism' or 'imperialism'", an assessment Simon van Zuylen-Wood of New York called "true". Van Zuylen-Wood also wrote that Piker "refuses to accept that not every opinion he disagrees with is shaped by someone's false consciousness".

In July 2024, Alex Mahadevan of the Poynter Institute for Media Studies cited Piker as an example of the "online chattering class" who do not hold themselves to journalistic ethics, in contrast to their peers in old media. A September 2024 article in the academic journal Digital Journalism discussed a similar theme, calling Piker emblematic of an emerging "newsfluencer" class (influencers who mainly cover news) with a tendency toward "problematic behavior" that conflicts with journalistic objectivity. In April 2024, a contributor to the same journal wrote that Piker is familiar with journalistic mechanics such as sourcing, framing, and objectivity but rejects these as methods used for "manufacturing consent for elites". Instead, Piker mainly sources his information from social media, often supplied to him by his audience. The Washington Post has also categorized Piker as a news-based influencer who does not feel bound to journalistic objectivity.

Marantz wrote that Piker is controversial on both the political left and right: "When Piker is criticized by the right, it's usually for soft-pedaling the brutality of Hamas, or the Houthis, or the Chinese Communist Party ... By the left, he is more likely to be dismissed as a limousine socialist who lives in a $2.7-million house." In GQ magazine, Kieran Press-Reynolds wrote that Piker is also controversial among liberals and the Democratic Party, which Piker attributes to his criticism of Israel. Marantz also wrote that Piker's tolerance of controversy and appeal to young men made him an ideal "Joe Rogan of the left". Van Zuylen-Wood has written that Piker is not a "left-wing Rogan, a genial and curious interviewer with unpredictable leanings" but a "left-wing Charlie Kirk, a nonstop polemicist engaged in winning actual power".

== Awards and nominations ==
Gaming website Kotaku selected Piker as one of its "Gamers of The Year" in 2020, calling him a major figure in the mainstreaming of political commentary on Twitch, a platform that in the past was seen as discouraging political discussion. Piker won a Streamy in the News category at the 10th annual awards in 2020 and was nominated again in the same category for the 2021 event. In 2022 and 2023, Piker was nominated at the 12th and 13th Streamy Awards in the categories News, Just Chatting, and Streamer of the Year, winning the News award both times and being nominated in the category for four consecutive years. Piker was one of the Time 100 creators for 2025. He was number 3 on Rolling Stone's list of the most influential creators of 2026.

Award	Year	Category	Nominated work	Result	Ref.
Shorty Awards	2018	Web Series	The Breakdown (Note: Co-hosted with Francis Maxwell.)	Nominated	
Webby Awards	2018	News & Information	The Breakdown	Nominated	
theScore esports Awards	2020	Like & Subscribe	HasanAbi	Won	
The Streamer Awards	2021	Best Just Chatting Streamer	HasanAbi	Nominated	
The Streamer Awards	2022	Streamer of the Year	HasanAbi	Nominated	
The Streamer Awards	2022	Best Just Chatting Streamer	HasanAbi	Won	
The Streamer Awards	2023	Best Just Chatting Streamer	HasanAbi	Nominated	
The Streamer Awards	2024	Best Just Chatting Streamer	HasanAbi	Nominated	
The Streamer Awards	2026	League of their Own	HasanAbi	Nominated	
Streamy Awards	2020	News	HasanAbi	Won	
Streamy Awards	2021	News	HasanAbi	Nominated	
Streamy Awards	2022	Streamer of the Year	HasanAbi	Nominated	
Streamy Awards	2022	Just Chatting	HasanAbi	Nominated	
Streamy Awards	2022	News	HasanAbi	Won	
Streamy Awards	2023	News	HasanAbi	Won	
Streamy Awards	2023	Streamer of the Year	HasanAbi	Nominated	
Streamy Awards	2023	Just Chatting	HasanAbi	Nominated	
