= Teddy Fresh =

American streetwear brand

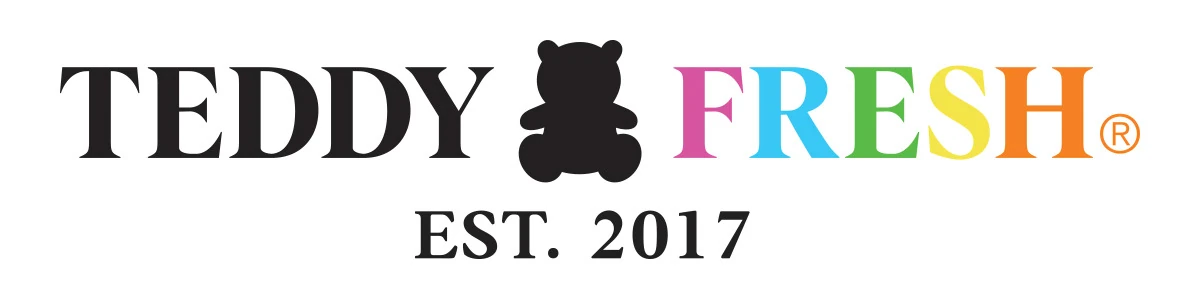
- Wordmark used since 2023
- Industry: Clothing industry
- Founded: 2017
- Founders: Hila Klein
- Headquarters: Los Angeles, California
- Website: www.teddyfresh.com

Teddy Fresh is an American streetwear brand headquartered in Los Angeles and founded in 2017 by Israeli-American YouTuber and designer Hila Hacmon.

== History ==
Hacmon launched the Teddy Fresh apparel range in 2017. The name is based on the mutual love she and her then-husband, Ethan Klein, had for the name Theodore, or Teddy. “We’ve always just loved it. We kind of thought about a cool teddy bear,” she said. “We just said Teddy Fresh.”

Teddy Fresh products are designed to be “colorful and playful” and are inspired by kids clothing and ‘90s fashion. The apparel is known for featuring pastel and color-block patterns, and products include t-shirts, hoodies, sweaters, and jackets, for men and for women. The brand uses materials such as denim, jacquard, angora wool, and sueded fleece.

Spin-off cosmetics brand Teddy Glow launched in November 2025. The inaugural collection featured a dragon fruit scented lip balm with a Teddy Fresh bear logo charm attached, liquid eyeliner pen with an eraser end, 9-shade shimmer eyeshadow palette, and two shades of liquid blush.

On October 23, 2026, Ethan Klein announced that he was seeking to remove his ownership from Teddy Fresh, following his separation and subsequent divorce from Hila.

=== Controversies ===
In 2020, co-founder Ethan Klein accused YouTuber James Charles of copying the color palette and color-block design of Teddy Fresh's most popular hoodie for his Sisters Apparel merchandise. Charles denied that the design had been copied, responding that he had never seen the Teddy Fresh design.

== Collaborations ==
In 2020, Teddy Fresh collaborated with the animated television series SpongeBob SquarePants. In 2021, Teddy Fresh released clothing in collaboration with the Care Bears brand.

On November 13, 2021, Teddy Fresh hosted a pop-up event in Los Angeles featuring the brand’s November 2021 collection— a collaboration with the Looney Tunes brand.

In February 2022, Teddy Fresh announced a new collaboration with singer Elton John called Teddy Fresh x Elton John which was “inspired by the way John has revolutionized music and broken boundaries and by his outlandish style and lust for life.”

In March 2023, Teddy Fresh announced a collection using the IP of Toho International's Godzilla property. The collection featured various clothing items and a skateboard deck.

In November 2023, Hasbro announced a collaboration between Teddy Fresh and Magic: The Gathering.
