= Andrew Marantz =

American journalist and author

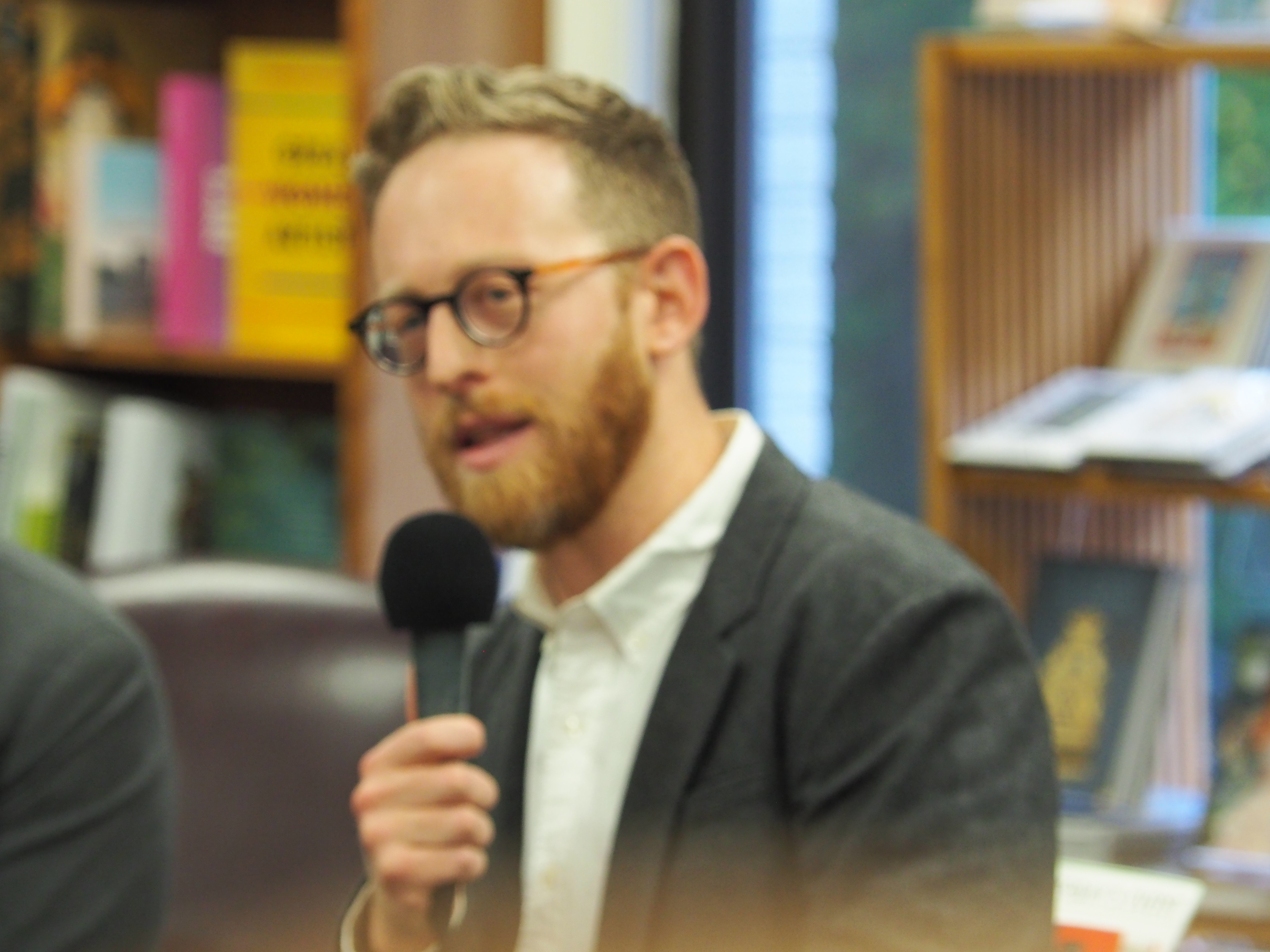
- Marantz in 2019
- Born: September 26, 1984 (age 41)
- Education: Brown University (BA); New York University
- Spouse: Sarah Lustbader (m. 2013)
- Children: 1

Andrew Marantz (born September 26, 1984) is an American author and journalist who writes for The New Yorker.

== Early life and education ==
Marantz was born on September 26, 1984, the son of physician Paul R. Marantz. He graduated from Brown University, receiving a bachelor's degree in religion and religious studies in 2006. From 2009 to 2011 he was a graduate student at New York University, receiving a master's degree in journalism.

== Career ==
Marantz is a staff writer for The New Yorker, contributing to the magazine since 2011. In 2019 he published his book, Antisocial: Online Extremists, Techno-Utopians and the Hijacking of the American Conversation, The edition of the book published by London's Picador is entitled Antisocial: How Extremists Broke America. In 2020, Project Syndicate chose it as one of the best reads of 2020, finding it "one of the best recent accounts of how social media has come to dominate political discourse in the United States."

== Personal life ==
In 2013, Marantz married Sarah Lustbader, a lawyer. They have a son who was born 2017. Marantz is Jewish.
