= H3h3Productions =

YouTube channel

h3h3Productions
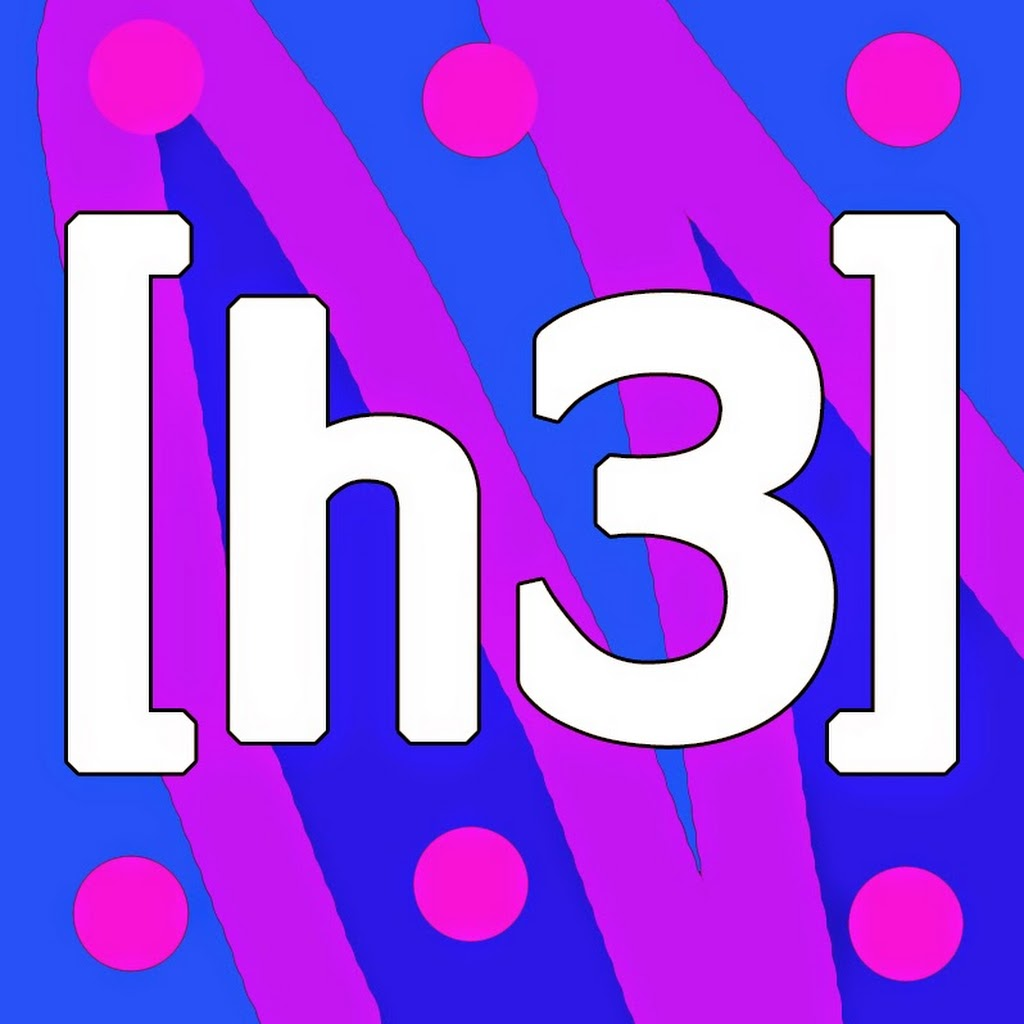

YouTube information
- Channel: h3h3Productions
- Years active: 2011–2026 (hiatus)
- Genres: Comedy; satire; reaction
- Subscribers: 5.42 million
- Views: 1.38 billion
- Last updated: October 23, 2026

h3h3Productions is a YouTube channel created and formerly hosted by then-husband-and-wife duo Ethan Klein and Hila Hacmon. Their content consists of reaction videos and sketch comedy in which they satirize internet culture. The H3 Podcast has been their podcast channel since 2017.

In October 2026, Hila announced the couple's separation, alleging that Ethan had an extramarital affair. Ethan subsequently announced that he was relinquishing his shares of the company. As of October 2026, H3 Podcast is on indefinite hiatus.

== History ==
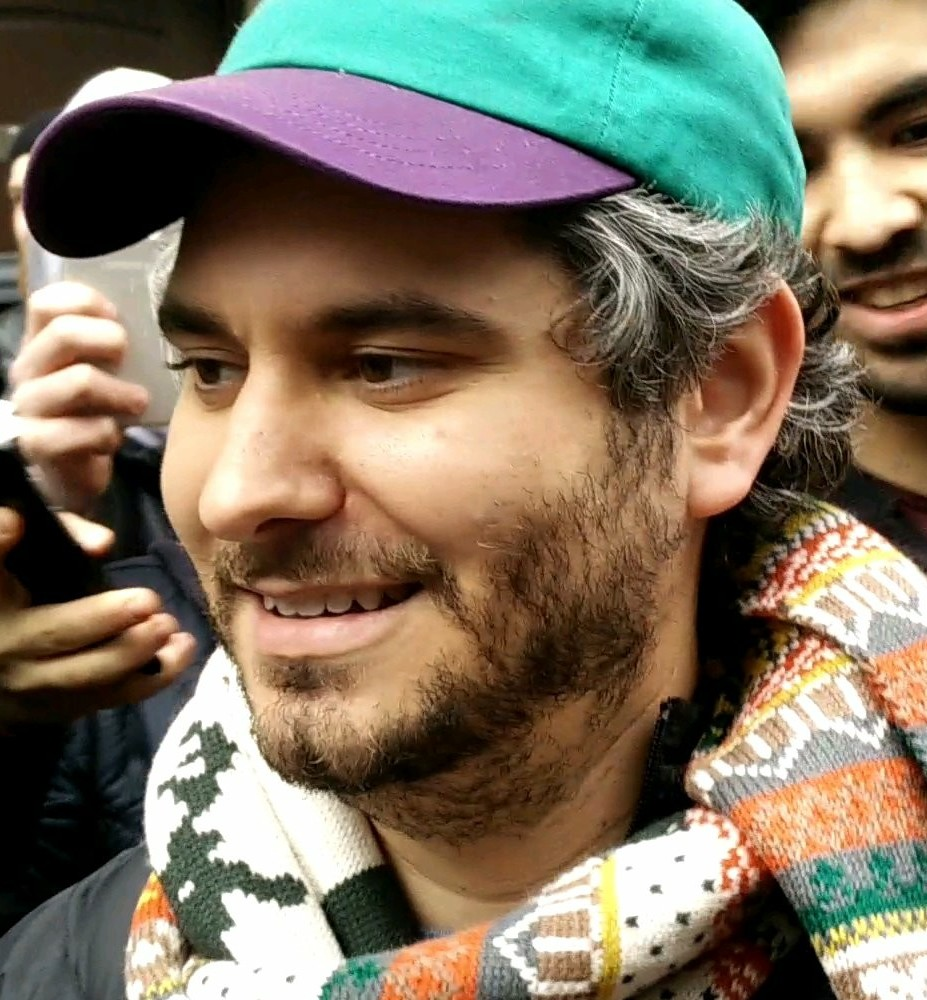
Ethan Klein in 2017

Ethan Edward Klein (born June 25, 1985) is an American YouTuber, comedian, and podcaster. He was the host of the H3 Podcast. He also used to make videos with the YouTube channel h3h3Productions, created by him and Hila Klein (née Hacmon; born December 12, 1987); the two were married at the time. Klein was born in Ventura, California, in 1985 to Donna and Gary Klein, and has two older siblings.

Ethan attended Buena High School and has a bachelor's degree in English literature from the University of California, Santa Cruz. He met his wife, Hila Hacmon, in Israel at a Holocaust museum during a Birthright Israel trip in 2007 when Hila was serving in the Israel Defense Forces (IDF). They married in 2012. The Kleins have three sons together. Ethan has been diagnosed with Tourette syndrome.

Ethan and Hila set up their YouTube channel, h3h3Productions, in 2011. The channel is best known for its reaction videos, which comprise clips of a source video interspersed with commentary and absurd comedy sketches.

The channel has gained a reputation for critiquing a range of online personalities, as well as trends in internet culture and several YouTube policies. The Kleins have been noted for criticizing YouTube channels that entice young viewers to participate in online gambling related to the video game Counter-Strike: Global Offensive, mainly by trading skins for real-world currency.

In the mid-2010s, the channel experienced significant growth, particularly following the release of the video "Vape Nation" in 2016, which became one of its most widely viewed uploads and contributed to its mainstream popularity. Later in this period, h3h3Productions began to refine its approach to internet commentary. Using a mix of satire and critique, the channel distinguished itself over time. Visually, its style became recognizable for abrupt cuts and layered effects.

The content remained focused on analyzing online trends and personalities. As their audience expanded, their influence within YouTube culture grew. Such developments helped define their role in early commentary media. At the same time, their editing techniques became a core part of their identity. Notably, this era established many of the conventions they would continue to use.

=== Allegations against The Wall Street Journal ===
h3h3Productions, alongside several other channels, supported YouTube personality PewDiePie amid a 2017 controversy over jokes about Nazis in one of his videos from January. On February 14, The Wall Street Journal ran a story about PewDiePie's previous references to Adolf Hitler, which brought nine other videos into the debate and elicited frequent discussions on whether media took them out of context. When YouTube subsequently released tools to allow advertisers to avoid offensive videos, Ethan claimed that the tools were overly broad and negatively affected unrelated content, including his own channel.

One of the authors of the Wall Street Journal piece, Jack Nicas, wrote another article on March 24 claiming YouTube did not go far enough to prevent advertising from displaying on videos that might contain racist content. Ethan accused the report of being written selectively to maximize outrage. The article showed a Coca-Cola ad playing on a video of the white supremacist country song "Alabama Nigger" by the American musical group Trashy White Band.

Upon seeing that the video was not contributing to the uploader's income, Ethan alleged that Nicas had used an altered screenshot. Hours later, he was informed that the video was indeed monetized, but on behalf of a copyright claim rather than at the choice or to the benefit of the uploader. He withdrew his accusation in response, and The Wall Street Journal released a statement that it stood by the authenticity of the screenshots.

=== Hosseinzadeh v. Klein ===
Ruling of Hosseinzadeh v. Klein

In April 2016, Matt Hosseinzadeh, an American YouTube personality who goes by "MattHossZone" and "Bold Guy", filed a civil action against the Kleins for copyright infringement in a video on the h3h3Productions channel. Hosseinzadeh claims that he initially contacted the Kleins "to politely ask them to remove [his] content from their video", but that they refused. His lawyer claimed that the video used more than 70% of his work "while contributing nothing substantive to it".

After a video on this was released by h3h3Productions the following month, fellow YouTuber Philip DeFranco started a fundraiser on GoFundMe to help raise money for the Kleins' legal fees, citing the need to protect fair use on YouTube. On May 26, 2016, the Kleins announced that the $130,000 raised would go into an escrow account called the "Fair Use Protection Account" (FUPA), overseen by law firm Morrison & Lee LLP and to be used to help people defend fair use.

The Kleins won the lawsuit, with U.S. District Judge Katherine B. Forrest ruling that their commentary video constituted "fair use as a matter of law" and describing it as "quintessential comment and criticism". The case is the first of its kind to receive a judgment; while not legally binding across the United States, it provided a persuasive argument to be cited in future cases relating to fair use on YouTube.

=== Legal disputes with Triller and Ryan Kavanaugh ===
In May 2021, the company Triller sued Ethan and Hila Klein, alleging the pair had pirated the Jake Paul vs. Ben Askren fight on the H3 Podcast. Despite attempts to settle, the Kleins faced additional legal actions as the feud intensified. Ryan Kavanaugh, co-founder of Triller, filed a separate defamation lawsuit, accusing Ethan of spreading false claims and maliciously targeting him through various platforms. The accusations included promoting damaging articles, creating a website comparing Kavanaugh to Harvey Weinstein, and allegedly paying Wikipedia editors to tarnish Kavanaugh's online reputation.

The lawsuits became a focal point of discussion on the H3 Podcast, where Ethan Klein publicly criticized Kavanaugh's motives, framing the legal battle as an attempt to suppress free speech. As of August 2024, the parties have reached a settlement, but the terms have not been publicly disclosed.

=== Reaction content lawsuit ===
On June 20, 2025, Klein revealed his plans to sue Twitch streamers Denims, Frogan, and Kaceytron for copyright infringement. He alleged that these streamers' reactions to his video on Hasan Piker were not fair use, as they reacted to the entire video with minimal commentary. Additionally, he alleged that the streams rose to the level of malicious copyright infringement, as all three streamers had encouraged their viewers to watch Klein's video on their own stream, with the stated purpose of depriving him of the income from these views. Klein announced that he had registered the video beforehand with the Library of Congress in order to strengthen his copyright claim.

On July 31, 2025, Klein's legal team filed a subpoena to unmask the Reddit and Discord moderators of the r/h3snark subreddit and Discord server so that their names could be added to the cases for contributory copyright infringement. Lawyers on behalf of the moderators attempted to quash the subpoena, citing concerns for moderators' safety if they were unmasked. On April 29, 2026, the Northern District of California Court denied the motion to quash, finding that the Kleins had made a prima facie case of contributory copyright infringement against the moderators and that their right to know the moderators' identities outweighed the moderators' interest in staying anonymous.

On April 17, 2026, Denims and her legal team filed a Motion for Judgment on the Pleadings as a formal request to the judge to decide the case based solely on the written documents submitted, without considering additional evidence. On June 5, 2026, Judge Wesley Hsu issued an order granting her motion on the grounds that Denims' livestream reaction to Klein's video constituted fair use as a matter of law under 17 U.S.C. § 107. The judge cited Klein's own 2017 fair use legal precedent in Hosseinzadeh v. Klein, as well as Klein's concession in his lawsuit that Denims' use of the video was "highly transformative"—Hsu ruled that all four statutory fair use factors weighed in her favor. Klein later posted on his Instagram that he planned to appeal, believing the decision does not match his other copyright ruling involving H3 snark moderators that was made in the same court district. Because of this, he said he is "extremely confident" that a higher court will overturn the decision. The case against Kaceytron was subsequently withdrawn, and she issued a public apology.

=== Separation and H3 Podcast hiatus ===
On October 22, 2026, Ethan announced that the H3 Podcast would go on an indefinite hiatus. On October 23, Hila announced their separation and alleged that Ethan had admitted to an ongoing extramarital affair lasting more than six months. Ethan later stated that he was stepping down from the podcast and urged fans not to attempt to contact his family. The podcast's production crew expressed support for Hila and announced that its members would no longer work with Ethan. They have stated that the show's future is uncertain. Hila filed for divorce on November 2.

== Nominations ==
In 2017, h3h3Productions was nominated for the Streamy Awards in comedy.
