= Baphomet (disambiguation) =

Baphomet is an occult deity and symbol.

Baphomet may also refer to:

- Aleister Crowley (1875–1947), also known as Baphomet, English occultist
- Sigil of Baphomet, a sigil of the material world, representing carnality and earthly principles
- Statue of Baphomet, a statue commissioned by the Satanic Temple

== Characters ==
- Baphomet (comics), a Marvel Comics character
- Baphomet (Dungeons & Dragons), a Dungeons & Dragons character
- Baphomet, an alias of the DC Comics character Onomatopoeia in the comic book series Batman: The Widening Gyre
- Baphomet, a character in the novella Cabal
- Baphomet, a character in the webcomic 8-Bit Theater
- Baphomet, a character in the video game Ragnarok Online
- Baphomet, a character in the video game La-Mulana
- Baphomet, an alias of the Imagem Comics character Nergal in the comic book series The Wicked + The Divine
- Baphomet, a character in the film Godzilla: King of the Monsters

== Literature ==
- Baphomet, a 1928 novel by Franz Spunda
- The Baphomet, a 1965 novel by Pierre Klossowski

== Music ==
- Baphomet Records, an American record label started by Killjoy, later merged with Phil Anselmo's record label to become Baphomet/Housecore Records

=== Songs ===
- "Baphomet", a song by Angel Witch from the 2000 re-issue of the album Angel Witch
- "Baphomet", a song by Quicksand from the 1993 album Slip
- "Baphomet", a song by Grave Digger from the 1998 album Knights of the Cross
- "Baphomet", a song by Dark Fortress from the 2008 album Eidolon
