= Silver St. Cloud =

- Silver St. Cloud in Detective Comics #475 (Feb. 1978), art by Marshall Rogers and Terry Austin.

Publication information
- Publisher: DC Comics
- First appearance: Detective Comics #470 (June 1977)
- Created by: Steve Englehart (writer); Walt Simonson (artist)

In-story information
- Supporting character of: Batman
- Abilities: Archery

Silver St. Cloud is a fictional character appearing in American comic books published by DC Comics, commonly in association with the superhero Batman. The character debuted in Detective Comics #470 (June 1977) and was created by Steve Englehart and Walt Simonson. Silver St. Cloud is typically depicted as a romantic interest of Bruce Wayne.

St. Cloud appeared in the second season of Gotham, portrayed by Natalie Alyn Lind.

== Publication history ==
Created by Steve Englehart and Walt Simonson, Silver St. Cloud debuted in Detective Comics #470 (February 1977). The issues featuring her earlier appearances have been collected in trade paperback form as Batman: Strange Apparitions.

== Fictional character biography ==
St. Cloud is a socialite residing in Gotham City, hosting parties for the rich and influential. She later becomes a successful event planner outside Gotham.

=== Detective Comics debut (Batman: Strange Apparitions) ===
Silver St. Cloud is Bruce Wayne's love interest in stories from Detective Comics #469–476, 478 and 479, later reprinted as a trade paperback collection of those stories titled Batman: Strange Apparitions. St. Cloud first meets Bruce Wayne following the Batman's defeat of new villain Doctor Phosphorus in a battle that occurred at a nuclear power plant on the ocean. She soon begins dating Bruce Wayne. She suspects from the start that Bruce is hiding something, citing his interest in crime reports and his encounters with Batman as evidence of a secret. When Bruce Wayne is captured and replaced by Hugo Strange in a prosthetic disguise, Silver quickly notices Wayne is not acting like himself and contacts Dick Grayson (Robin) to tell him about Wayne's strange behavior. Her insight and quick action leads to Robin rescuing Bruce.

Silver is one of the few characters to have discovered Batman's secret identity. Her relationship with Bruce was initially in trouble due to his repeated disappearances. However, over the time she was able to piece together the clues and eventually recognize her lover in the Batman costume. Silver confirms her suspicions by calling out to Batman while he battled the villain Deadshot, causing him to turn and allowing Silver to recognize Batman's chin as the chin of Bruce Wayne. The initial appearances of Silver also represent the first time that it is explicitly recognized that Bruce Wayne or even Batman has engaged in a sexual relationship.

Silver witnesses Batman fighting the Joker. After defeating the Joker, Batman meets with Silver. She reveals to Batman that she knows his secret and that she still loves him. She says that she could not be with him because she could not stand worrying about him each night. She then ends the relationship, asking him not to see her again.

Silver's breakup with Bruce has repercussions in the following issues, where Batman takes out his frustration over the failed relationship on a couple of criminals. Most of his fury becomes concentrated on one criminal, whom he punches repeatedly. Bruce tells Alfred Pennyworth that he blames his crimefighting persona for driving Silver away, and for a time muses whether he should give up being Batman forever.

=== Siege ===
In the Legends of the Dark Knight story arc "Siege", written by Archie Goodwin, St. Cloud briefly returns to Bruce Wayne's life while organizing a mercenaries' convention in Gotham, but is severely injured by the convention's leader when she discovers a plot to assault the city.

=== Batman: Dark Detective ===
Silver returns once again in Steve Englehart's story arc Batman: Dark Detective, a sequel to Batman: Strange Apparitions. In this series, her relationship with Bruce Wayne evolves further, to the point that Silver prepares to leave her fiancé, a campaigning senator, to be with him, but her fiancé's arm and leg are cut off in the Joker's booby traps while he attempts to find her in the Joker's house. Wayne instructs her to continue her relationship with the senator until his campaign ends, but she is angered by this and leaves Wayne's life again. Englehart wrote an additional chapter to the trilogy to resolve its plot, but DC declined to publish the story and it has since been removed from continuity.

In the DC Comics/Looney Tunes crossover special Batman/Elmer Fudd, Silver briefly enters a relationship with Elmer Fudd.

When Harley Quinn takes Catwoman on a fantasy heist, she encounters Silver St. Cloud who is a bow and arrow-wielding elf member of the Gotham Knights that are loyal to "Queen Selina" who was usurped by the Sorceress Queen. They would later be turned into Monster Men by the Sorceress Queen. Silver was restored to normal when Harley Quinn shattered the Sorcerer Queen's hourglass the moment she was driven off by a dragon version of Killer Croc.

== Powers and abilities ==
While not having any abilities in the Post-Crisis continuity, Silver St. Cloud is an expert archer in the Prime-Earth continuity.

== Reception ==
The character was ranked 64th in Comics Buyer's Guide's "100 Sexiest Women in Comics" list.

== Other versions ==
=== Batman: The Widening Gyre ===
Silver returns in the non-canon series Batman: The Widening Gyre, where she is killed by Onomatopoeia.

== In other media ==
=== Television ===
- Silver St. Cloud appears in the second season of Gotham, portrayed by Natalie Alyn Lind. This version is the step-niece and ward of corrupt billionaire Theo Galavan and his sister Tabitha Galavan.
- Silver St. Cloud appears in My Adventures with Superman, voiced by Melanie Minichino. In addition to being an influencer, philanthropist, and "fashion icon", this version is stated to be "a genius who made her fortune at thirteen". Additionally, she develops an interest in Superman while competing in Metropolis' most eligible bachelor and bachelorette contest.

=== Film ===
- Silver St. Cloud appears in Tom Mankiewicz's original script for Batman (1989) as Bruce Wayne's love interest and an underling of crime boss Rupert Thorne.
- Silver St. Cloud appears in Batman: Soul of the Dragon, voiced by Erica Luttrell.

=== Miscellaneous ===
Silver St. Cloud appears in DC Super Hero Girls, voiced by Grey Griffin.
