= Kevin Smith =

American filmmaker, actor and podcaster (born 1970)

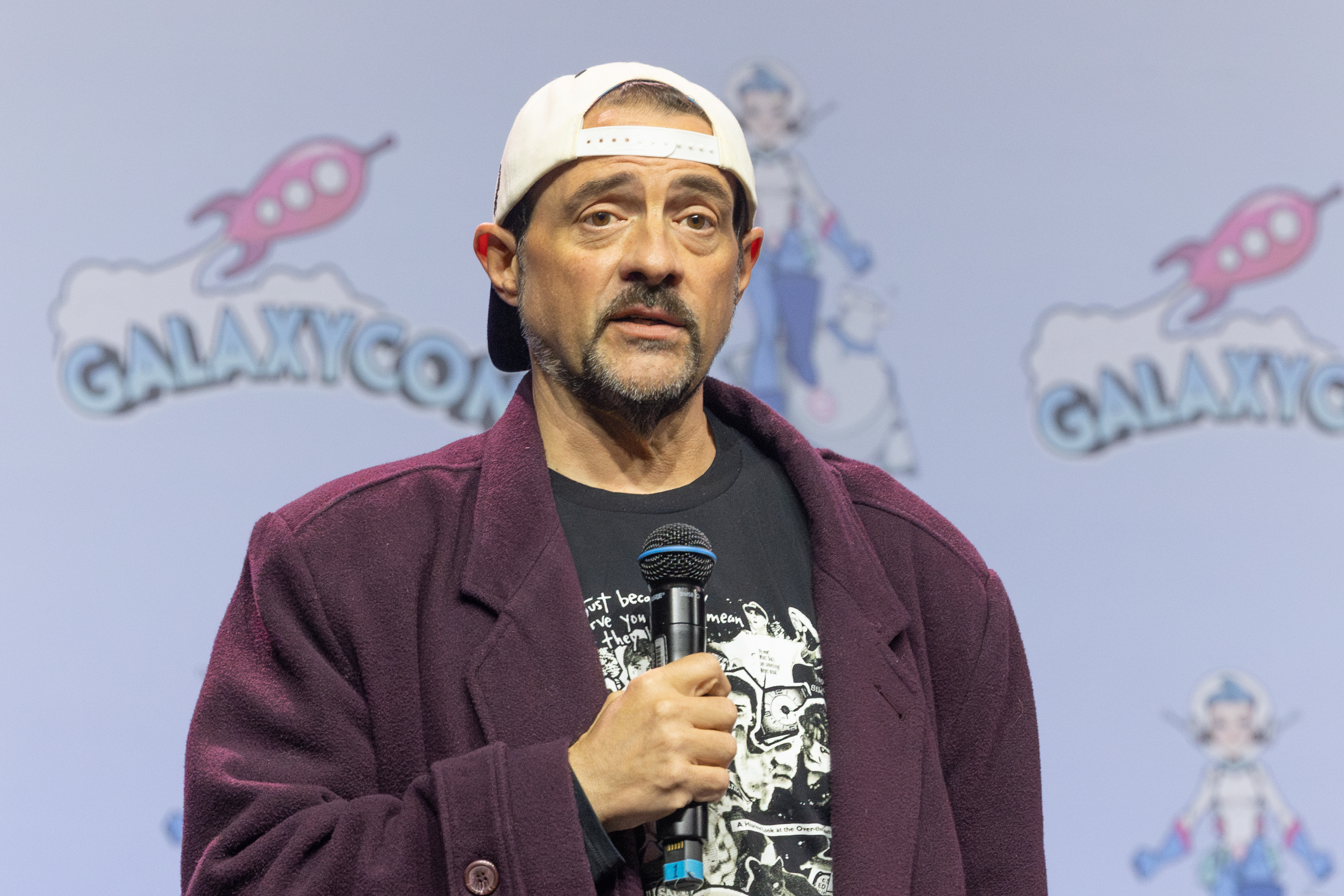
- Smith at GalaxyCon Richmond in 2026
- Born: Kevin Patrick Smith; August 2, 1970 (age 56); Red Bank, New Jersey, U.S.
- Occupations: Writer; director; producer; film editor; actor; podcaster
- Years active: 1992–present
- Style: Comedy; horror; fantasy
- Spouse: Jennifer Schwalbach (m. 1999)
- Children: Harley Quinn Smith
- Awards: Inkpot Award (2018)
- Website: viewaskew.com

Kevin Patrick Smith (born August 2, 1970) is an American filmmaker, actor, and podcaster. He came to prominence with the low-budget comedy film Clerks (1994), which he wrote, directed, co-produced, co-edited, and acted in as the character Silent Bob. Silent Bob and his partner in delinquency, Jay, also appear in Smith's later films Mallrats (1995), Chasing Amy (1997), Dogma (1999), Jay and Silent Bob Strike Back (2001), Clerks II (2006), Jay and Silent Bob Reboot (2019), and Clerks III (2022), which are set primarily in his home state of New Jersey. While not strictly sequential, the films have crossover plot elements, character references, and a shared canon known as the "View Askewniverse", named after Smith's production company View Askew Productions, which he co-founded with Scott Mosier.

He is a supporting actor in film, his most prominent role playing a rogue computer hacker in Live Free or Die Hard (2007), and has made cameos in other movies. His other non-"View Askewniverse" films written and directed by Smith include the comedy-drama Jersey Girl (2004), the sex comedy Zack and Miri Make a Porno (2008), Cop Out (2010), the horror Red State (2011), and the comedy horror Tusk (2014). He has directed numerous episodes of television for series such as The Flash (2016–2018), Supergirl (2017–2018), and The Goldbergs (2017–2019), and created the animated television series Clerks: The Animated Series (2000) and Netflix's Masters of the Universe (2021–2024).

Smith owns Jay and Silent Bob's Secret Stash in Red Bank, New Jersey, a comic book store which became the setting for the reality television show Comic Book Men (2012–2018). As a podcaster, Smith co-hosts several shows on his SModcast Podcast Network, including SModcast, Fatman Beyond, and the live show Hollywood Babble-On. He is known for participating in long, humorous Q&A sessions that are often filmed for release, beginning with the DVD release of An Evening with Kevin Smith (2002).

== Early life ==
Kevin Patrick Smith was born on August 2, 1970, in Red Bank, New Jersey, the son of Grace (née Schultz, 1945–2025), a homemaker, and Donald E. Smith (1936–2003), a postal worker. He has two siblings: an older sister, Virginia, and an older brother, Donald Jr. He was raised in a Catholic household in the nearby clamming town of Highlands.

Smith's childhood was scheduled around his father's late shifts at the post office. His father grew to despise his job, which greatly influenced Smith, who remembers his father finding it difficult on some days to get up and go to work. Smith vowed never to work at something that he did not enjoy.

Smith attended Henry Hudson Regional High School, where he was a B and C student, videotaped basketball games, and produced Saturday Night Live-style sketch comedy. An overweight teen, he developed into a comedic observer of life to socialize with friends and girls. After high school, Smith attended The New School in New York City, but did not graduate. Smith met Jason Mewes while working at a youth center; they became friends after discovering a mutual interest in comic books.

== Career ==
=== As a filmmaker ===
On his 21st birthday, Smith saw Richard Linklater's comedy Slacker. Impressed that Linklater set and shot the film in his hometown of Austin, Texas, rather than on a soundstage in a major city, Smith was inspired to become a filmmaker, and to set films where he lived. He has said: "It was the movie that got me off my ass; it was the movie that lit a fire under me, the movie that made me think, 'Hey, I could be a filmmaker.' And I had never seen a movie like that before ever in my life." He assembled a library of independent filmmakers like Linklater, Jim Jarmusch, Spike Lee and Hal Hartley to draw from.

For four months Smith attended Vancouver Film School, where he met longtime collaborators Scott Mosier and Dave Klein. Unlike them, Smith left halfway through the course, figuring he knew enough to proceed and wanting to save money for his first film.

Smith moved back to New Jersey and got his old job back at a convenience store in the Leonardo section of Middletown Township, New Jersey. He decided to set his film, Clerks, at the store, borrowing the a-day-in-the-life structure from the Spike Lee film Do the Right Thing. Smith maxed out more than a dozen credit cards, and sold his much-treasured comic book collection, to raise $27,575 to make the film, while saving money by casting friends and acquaintances in most roles. Clerks was screened at the Sundance Film Festival in 1994, where it won the Filmmaker's Trophy. At a restaurant following the screening, Miramax Films executive Harvey Weinstein invited Smith to join him at his table, where he offered to buy the film. In May 1994, it went to the Cannes International Film Festival, where it won both the Prix de la Jeunesse and the International Critics' Week Prize. Released in October 1994 in two cities, the film went on to play in 50 markets, never playing on more than 50 screens at any given time. Despite the limited release, it was a critical and financial success, earning $3.1 million. Initially, the film received an NC-17 rating from the MPAA for sexually graphic language. Miramax hired Alan Dershowitz to sue the MPAA. At an appeals screening, a jury of members of the National Association of Theatre Owners reversed the MPAA's decision, and the film was given an R rating. The movie had a profound effect on the independent film community. According to producer and author John Pierson, it is considered one of the two most influential film debuts in the 1990s, along with The Brothers McMullen.

Smith's second film, Mallrats, Jason Lee's debut as a leading man, did not fare as well as expected. It received a critical drubbing and earned only $2.2 million at the box office despite playing on more than 500 screens. Mallrats was more successful in the home video market.

Widely hailed as Smith's best film, 1997's Chasing Amy marked what Quentin Tarantino called "a quantum leap forward" for Smith. Starring Mallrats alumni Jason Lee, Joey Lauren Adams and Ben Affleck, the $250,000 film earned $12 million at the box office, wound up on a number of critics' year-end best lists, and won two Independent Spirit Awards (for Screenplay and Supporting Actor for Lee). The film received some criticism from members of the lesbian community, who felt that it reinforced the perception that lesbians merely need to find the right man. Smith, whose brother Donald is gay, found this accusation frustrating, as he has endeavored to be a pro-LGBT filmmaker, believing that sexuality is more fluid, with social taboos, not sexual desire, preventing more people from expressing bisexuality.

Smith's fourth film, Dogma (1999), featured an all-star cast and was mired in controversy. A religious-themed comedy that starred a post-Good Will Hunting Ben Affleck and Matt Damon, as well as Chris Rock, Salma Hayek, George Carlin, Alan Rickman, Linda Fiorentino, and Lee and Mewes, it was criticized by the Catholic League. The film debuted at the 1999 Cannes Film Festival, out of competition. Released on 800 screens in November 1999, the $10 million film earned $30 million.

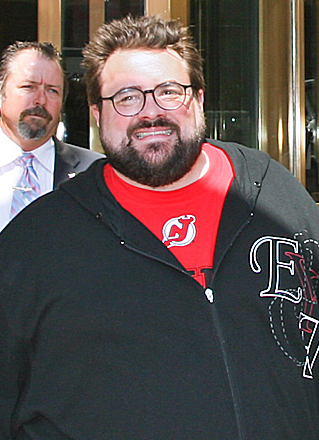
Smith at the 2008 Toronto International Film Festival

Smith then focused the spotlight on the two characters who had appeared in supporting roles in his previous four films. Jay and Silent Bob Strike Back featured an all-star cast, with many familiar faces returning from those four films. Affleck and Damon appear as themselves filming a mock sequel to Good Will Hunting. The $20 million film earned $30 million at the box office and received mixed reviews from critics.

Jersey Girl, with Affleck, Liv Tyler, George Carlin, and Raquel Castro, Smith's first film outside the View Askewniverse, marked a new direction in Smith's career. The film took a critical beating as it was seen as, in Smith's own words, "Gigli 2", because it co-starred Affleck and his then girlfriend, Jennifer Lopez. Smith heavily reedited the film to reduce Lopez's role to just a few scenes, but the film did poorly at the box office. Budgeted at $35 million, it earned $36 million.

In the 2006 sequel Clerks II, Smith revisited the Dante and Randal characters from his first film. Roundly criticized before its release, the film won favorable reviews as well as two awards (the Audience Award at the Edinburgh Film Festival and the Orbit Dirtiest Mouth Award at the MTV Movie Awards). It marked Smith's third trip to the Cannes International Film Festival, where it received an eight-minute standing ovation. The $5 million film, starring Jeff Anderson, Brian O'Halloran, Rosario Dawson, Mewes, Jennifer Schwalbach and Smith reprising his role as Silent Bob, earned $25 million.

Zack and Miri Make a Porno was originally announced in March 2006 as Smith's second non-Askewniverse film. The film began shooting on January 18, 2008, in Monroeville, Pennsylvania, and wrapped on March 15, 2008. It stars Seth Rogen and Elizabeth Banks as the title characters who decide to make a low-budget pornographic film to solve their money problems. It was released on October 31, 2008, and ran into many conflicts getting an "R" rating. Rogen said:

It's a really filthy movie. I hear they are having some problems getting an R rating from an NC-17 rating, which is never good. They [fight against] sex stuff. Isn't that weird? It's really crazy to me that Hostel is fine, with people gouging their eyes out and shit like that, but you can't show two people having sex—that's too much.

Smith took the film through the MPAA's appeals process and received an R rating without having to make any edits. Zack and Miri Make a Porno was considered a box-office "flop". It was hurt by "tepid media advertising for a movie with the title PORNO". In the aftermath of the film's performance, Smith's and Weinstein's business relationship became "frayed". Zack and Miri opened #2 behind High School Musical 3: Senior Year with $10,682,000 from 2,735 theaters, an average of $3,906. The "bankable" Rogen experienced his "worst box-office opening ever". In an interview with Katla McGlynn of the Huffington Post, Smith said:

I was depressed, man. I wanted that movie to do so much better. I'm sitting there thinking 'That's it, that's it, I'm gone, I'm out. The movie didn't do well and I killed Seth Rogen's career! This dude was on a roll until he got in with the likes of me. I'm a career killer! Judd [Apatow]'s going to be pissed, the whole Internet's going to be pissed because they all like Seth, and the only reason they like me anymore is because I was involved with Seth! And now I fuckin' ruined that. It was like high school. I was like, 'I'm a dead man. I'll be the laughing stock.'

It was announced in 2009 that Smith had signed on to direct A Couple of Dicks, a buddy-cop comedy written by the Cullen Brothers and starring Bruce Willis and Tracy Morgan. Due to controversy surrounding the original title, it was changed to A Couple of Cops, then reverted to its original title due to negative reaction, before finally settling on the title Cop Out. The film, shot from June to August 2009, involves a pair of veteran cops tracking down a stolen vintage baseball card, and was released on February 26, 2010, to poor reviews; it was the first film Smith directed but did not write. Cop Out opened at number two at the box office and was mired in controversy, mostly over reported conflicts on the set between Smith and Willis. It was the last time Smith worked with a major studio, leading him to return to his independent film roots.

In September 2010, Smith started work on Red State, an independently financed horror film loosely inspired by the Westboro Baptist Church and its pastor, Fred Phelps. Weinstein and his brother Bob, who had been involved in the distribution of Smith's films except Mallrats and Cop Out, declined to support Red State. The film stars Michael Parks, John Goodman and Melissa Leo. Smith had said he would auction off rights to the $4 million film at a controversial event following its debut screening at Sundance but instead kept the rights to the film himself and self-distributed it under the SModcast Pictures banner. The January 2011 premiere drew protests from a half-dozen members of the church, along with many more who counter-protested Westboro members. Smith explained his decision as a way to return to an era when marketing a film did not cost four times as much as the film itself, a situation he called "decadent and deadening".Red State was a box office bomb, earning just $1,104,682, and opened to poor reviews; the critical consensus (according to Rotten Tomatoes) was "Red State is an audacious and brash affair that ultimately fails to provide competent scares or thrills." In April 2011, Smith said that Red State had made its budget back by making $1 million on the first leg of the tour, $1.5 million from a handful of foreign sales and $3 million from a domestic distribution deal for VOD.

Smith had said before Red State that he would soon retire from directing, and announced that his last movie would be Clerks III. In December 2013, he said he would continue to make films, but only ones that were uniquely his, as opposed to generic ones "anybody could make".

In 2013, Smith directed Tusk, a horror film inspired by a story Smith and Mosier read about a Gumtree ad for a man who rents out a room in his house for free on the condition that the respondent dresses as a walrus for two hours per day. The project began pre-production in September 2013, and was shot in November of that year. Released September 19, 2014, it received mixed reviews.

Before Tusk's release, Smith wrote the script for a spin-off of the film, which he titled Yoga Hosers. The film began filming in August 2014, and was released in 2016. It stars Smith's daughter, Harley Quinn Smith, and Lily-Rose Depp, reprising their two minor characters from Tusk, with Johnny Depp playing his inspector character from the earlier film.

Smith revealed at the 2014 San Diego Comic-Con that he had written the script for a film called Moose Jaws, which he described as "Jaws with a moose", and which is planned to be the third film in his True North trilogy.

Smith wrote and directed one segment, Halloween, of the 2016 horror anthology film Holidays, in which each segment takes place during a different holiday.

In June 2017, Smith started shooting KillRoy Was Here, a horror film based on the graffiti phenomenon. Directed by Smith, the script was co-written with Andrew McElfresh, marking the first time he shared writing credit. It represents a retooling of their Anti-Claus film, which was initially canceled after the release of Krampus, due to the two stories' similarity. The film crew was mostly made up of students of the Ringling College of Art and Design, with shooting continuing over every semester break.

In 2017, due to obstacles getting Clerks 3 or Mallrats 2 produced, Smith decided to write and direct a Jay and Silent Bob Strike Back sequel instead, Jay and Silent Bob Reboot. It was scheduled to be filmed in September 2017, but shooting was postponed to February and March 2019. The first trailer for the film was released on July 18, 2019. Smith announced a tour to accompany the film.

On October 1, 2019, Smith announced on Instagram that Clerks III was happening and that Jeff Anderson, who had retired, had agreed to reprise his role as Randal. The film was released on September 13, 2022.

In 2024, Smith released The 4:30 Movie, focusing on a group of teenagers in the 1980s who spent a day "theatre-hopping", in Monmouth County, New Jersey.

==== Relationship with Harvey Weinstein ====
With the exception of Mallrats, all of Smith's films until 2008 were financed and/or distributed by Harvey Weinstein and his brother Bob, via their companies Miramax, Dimension Films, and The Weinstein Company. In 2008 Smith's relationship with Harvey Weinstein soured due to the financial failure of Zack and Miri Make a Porno, which Smith blamed on a lack of marketing. Nonetheless, they continued to discuss potential funding for other Smith projects, and The Weinstein Company co-produced Smith's 2016 talk show Geeking Out. Smith named the independent production company he created for the 2011 film Red State "The Harvey Boys" in Weinstein's honor. Smith is considered one of the writer-directors whose career Weinstein nurtured, a group that also includes Quentin Tarantino and David O. Russell.

Smith severed professional ties with Weinstein when he was informed of his assault on Rose McGowan. Soon after allegations of rape and sexual assault by Weinstein publicly surfaced in October 2017, Smith said on Twitter that he was "ashamed" of his relationship with Weinstein. On his Hollywood Babble-On podcast, he said: "My entire career is tied up with the man", adding: "No fucking movie is worth all this." He lamented that in addition to working with Weinstein, "I sat out there talking about this man like he was a hero, like he was my friend, like he was my father." He pledged to donate all his future residuals from his Weinstein-produced films to the nonprofit organization Women in Film, which advocates for the inclusion of more women in film production. Smith later announced that, due to the declining appeal of his earlier films, the residuals from Weinstein-funded films may be lower than expected; he decided that he would instead donate $2,000 a month to Women in Film.

==== Frequent collaborators ====
Smith regularly casts the same actors in his film projects. Jason Mewes has been in nine of his films, his wife Jennifer Schwalbach Smith in eight and Ben Affleck in seven.

=== Writer ===
In 1997, New Line Cinema hired Smith to rewrite Overnight Delivery, which was expected to be a blockbuster teen film. Smith's then-girlfriend Joey Lauren Adams almost took the role of Ivy in the movie, instead of the female lead in Chasing Amy. Eventually, she lost out to Reese Witherspoon, and Overnight Delivery was quietly released directly to video in April 1998. Smith was not credited for his contributions. He has said that the only scene that really used his dialogue was the opening scene, which includes a reference to longtime Smith friend Bryan Johnson.

Smith was an uncredited screenwriter on the 2000 comedy-drama film Coyote Ugly.

=== Comics and magazines ===
Smith has been a regular contributor to Arena magazine. In 2005, Miramax Books released Smith's first book, Silent Bob Speaks, a collection of previously published essays (most from Arena) dissecting pop culture, the film business, and Smith's personal life. His second book, My Boring-Ass Life: The Uncomfortably Candid Diary of Kevin Smith, published by Titan Books, was another collection of previously published essays (this time blogs from Smith's website silentbobspeaks.com) and reached No. 32 on The New York Times Best Sellers List. Titan released Smith's third book, Shootin' the Sh*t with Kevin Smith: The Best of the SModcast, on September 29, 2009.

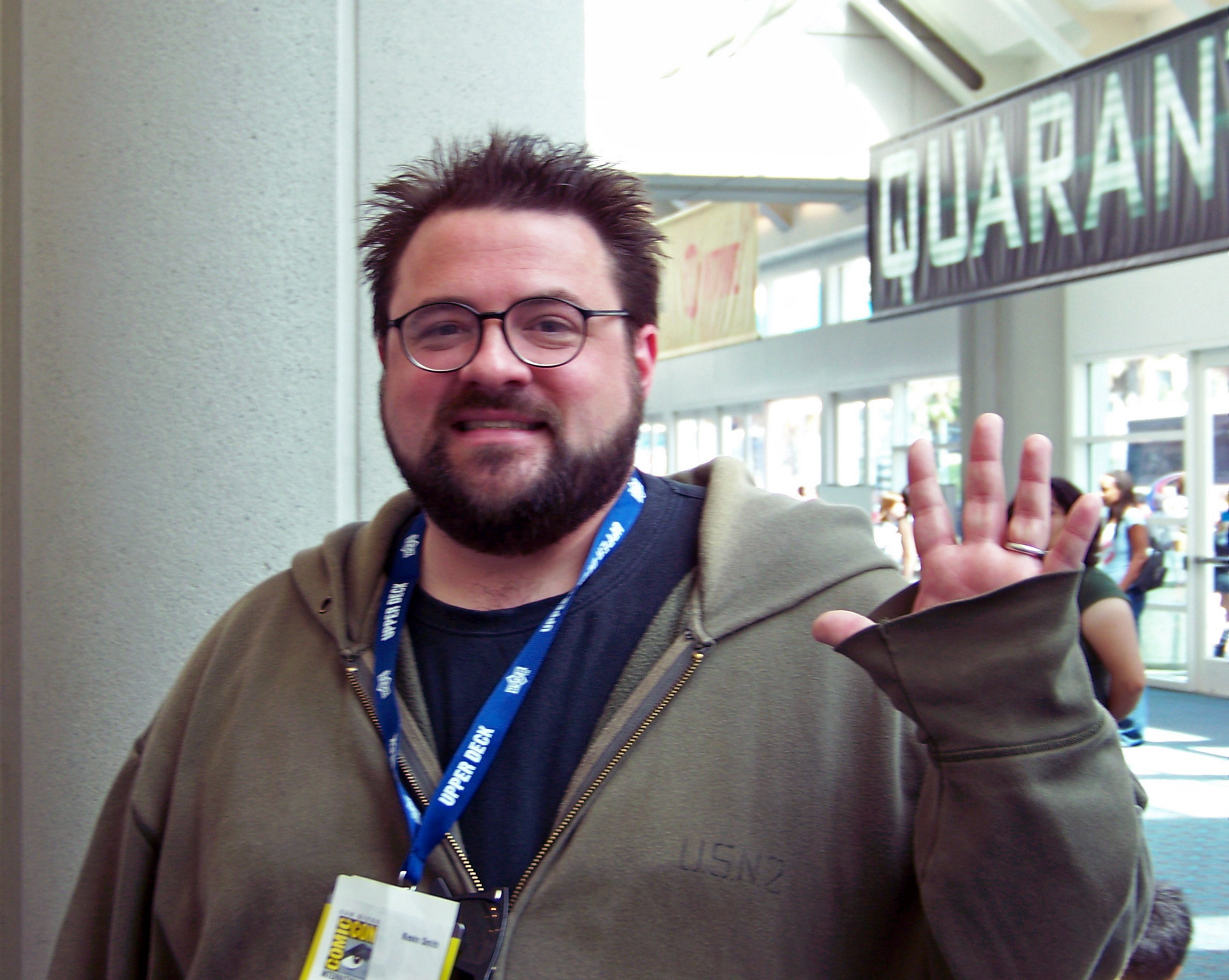
Smith at the 2008 San Diego Comic-Con International

A lifelong comic book fan, Smith's early forays into comic books dealt with previously established View Askew characters, and were published by Oni Press. He wrote a short Jay and Silent Bob story about Walt Flanagan's dog in Oni Double Feature No. 1, and followed it with a Bluntman and Chronic story in Oni Double Feature #12. He followed these with a series of Clerks comics. The first was Clerks: The Comic Book, which told of Randal's attempts to corner the market on Star Wars toys. The second was Clerks: Holiday Special, where Dante and Randal discover that Santa Claus lives in an apartment between the Quick Stop and RST Video. Third was Clerks: The Lost Scene, showing what happened inside Poston's Funeral Parlor. This story was later animated in the TV series style and included as an extra on the 10th Anniversary Clerks DVD.

Smith wrote the miniseries Chasing Dogma, which tells the story of Jay and Silent Bob between the films Chasing Amy and Dogma. He has written the trade paperback Bluntman and Chronic, published by Image, which purports to be a collection of the three issues of the series done by Holden McNeil and Banky Edwards (of Chasing Amy). It includes a color reprinting of the story from Oni Double Feature No. 12, purported to be an early appearance by McNeil and Edwards. These stories have been collected in Tales From the Clerks (Graphitti Designs, ISBN 0-936211-78-4), which includes a new Clerks story tying into the Clerks 2 material, and the story from Oni Double Feature #1. They were previously collected by Image Comics in three separate volumes, one each for Clerks, Chasing Dogma and Bluntman and Chronic. In 1999, Smith won a Harvey Award, for Best New Talent in comic books.

In 1999, Smith wrote "Guardian Devil", an eight-issue story arc of Daredevil for Marvel Comics illustrated by Joe Quesada. He produced a 15-issue tenure on Green Arrow for DC Comics that saw the return of Oliver Queen from the dead and the introduction of Mia Dearden, a teenage girl who would become Speedy after Smith's run had ended.

Smith returned to Marvel for two miniseries, Spider-Man/Black Cat: The Evil That Men Do and Daredevil/Bullseye: The Target, both of which debuted in 2002. The former was six issues long, but problems arose when the third issue was published two months after the initially scheduled release date. As a result, the final issues were delayed for at least three years, prompting Marvel to release an "in case you missed it" reprinting of the first three issues as one book before the remaining issues were released. The delay in part was due to Smith's work on Jersey Girl and Clerks II, causing him to shelve completion of the miniseries until the films were completed. He was announced as the writer of an ongoing Black Cat series and The Amazing Spider-Man in 2002, but because of the delays on Evil That Men Do and The Target, the plan was changed so that Smith would start a third Spider-Man title, launched in 2004 by Mark Millar instead. Spider-Man/Black Cat was completed in 2005, but Daredevil/Bullseye: The Target remains unfinished, with one issue published.

Smith wrote the limited series Batman: Cacophony, with art by friend Walt Flanagan, which ran from November 2008 to January 2009. The series featured the villains Onomatopoeia (a character created by Smith during his run at Green Arrow), The Joker, Maxie Zeus, and Victor Zsasz. The trade paperback of Batman: Cacophony became a New York Times Bestseller in their Hardcover Graphic Books section.

In 2010, Smith wrote a six-issue Batman miniseries, The Widening Gyre, for DC, drawn by Walt Flanagan. The series was initially planned as 12 issues, with a long break planned between issues six and seven. After issue six was published, Smith and Flanagan's work on their reality show, Comic Book Men, extended this planned break longer than expected. It was decided in the interim to release the remaining issues as a separate series, Batman: Bellicosity, scheduled for 2016, but it remains unreleased.

Also in 2010, Smith published a Green Hornet story for Dynamite Entertainment based on an unused script he wrote for a Green Hornet film that never came to fruition.

In August 2011, Dynamite Entertainment debuted Smith's The Bionic Man, which was based on a 1998 script he wrote that Universal rejected for being "more like a comic book than a movie".

In 2014, Smith and Ralph Garman released a six-issue Batman '66 crossover featuring Batman and Green Hornet, Batman '66 Meets the Green Hornet.

On March 7, 2022, it was announced that Dark Horse and Smith would be teaming up to publish the books of Secret Stash Press, a new publishing line by Smith. The first two books of the line include Maskerade, written by Smith and Andy McElfresh, and Quick Stops, written by Smith and set within the View Askewniverse.

=== Television ===
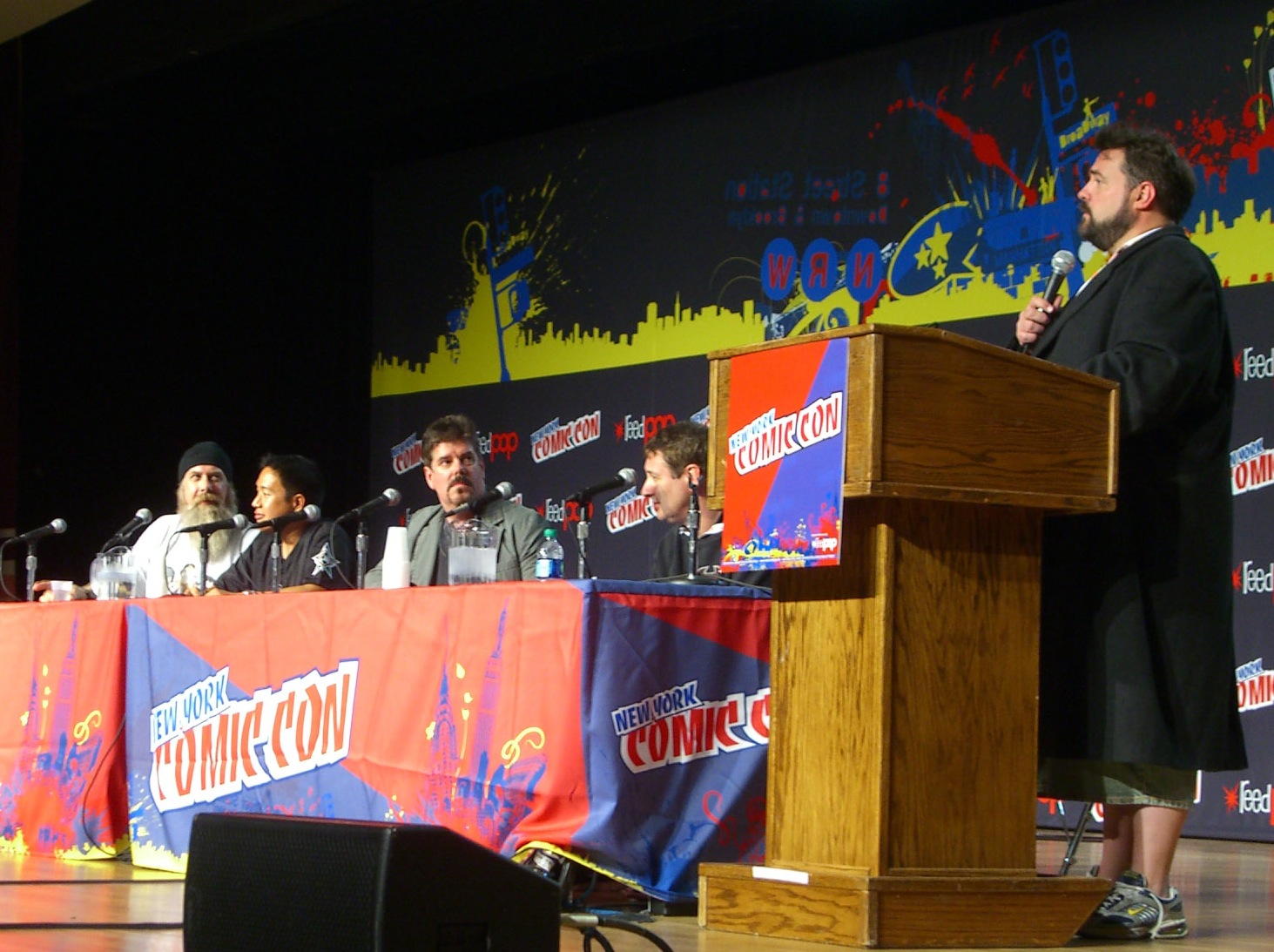
Smith and the cast of Comic Book Men at the New York Comic Con

In 1998, Smith shot two TV commercials for Coca-Cola in New Jersey.

In 2000, Smith and Mosier teamed up with television writer David Mandel to develop an animated television show based on Clerks called Clerks: The Animated Series. Only the first two episodes aired, on ABC in May 2000, before the series was canceled due to poor ratings. The six produced episodes were released on DVD in 2001.

During the mid-1990s, Smith directed and starred in a series of commercials for MTV, alongside Jason Mewes, in which they reprised their roles as Jay and Silent Bob. In 1998, he directed Mewes as "Gary Lamb – Ground Activist" in a series of Nike commercials. That same year, he shot commercials for Diet Coke. Two years later, he directed Star Wars toy commercials for Hasbro. He has directed and starred in commercials for Panasonic. In 2004, he shot a public service announcement for the Declare Yourself organization, which promotes youth voter registration. These advertisements brought Jay and Silent Bob out of their "semi-retirement".

In 2002, Smith produced a series of short films for The Tonight Show. Most of them involved Smith touring the country and visiting real-life locations where he comedically interacted with people, broadcast under the heading "Roadside Attractions", but he also debuted the fictional short The Flying Car featuring characters from Clerks.

Smith directed the pilot for The CW supernatural comedy series Reaper. He described it as "less Brimstone or Dead Like Me and more like Shaun of the Dead than anything else". He added that he took the job because he had always wanted to direct something he did not write, but never had an interest in doing it on the big screen.

Smith produced and appeared in the AMC reality television series Comic Book Men, which is set inside Smith's comic book shop, Jay and Silent Bob's Secret Stash, in Red Bank, New Jersey. The show ran for seven seasons, from 2012 to 2018.

A second series of Spoilers aired on The Comedy Network in Canada.

Smith has directed three episodes of The Flash ("The Runaway Dinosaur", "Killer Frost", and "Null and Annoyed"), four episodes of Supergirl ("Supergirl Lives", "Distant Sun", "Damage" and "Bunker Hill") and three episodes of The Goldbergs ("The Dynamic Duo", "Graduation Day" and "Our Perfect Strangers").

In February 2017, Smith was announced to write, direct, and executive produce a TV series based on the Image Comics title Sam and Twitch for BBC America.

In February 2019, Smith was announced to cowrite, with Dave Willis, an animated web series based on Marvel Comics' Howard the Duck for Hulu. In January 2020, it was announced that the Howard the Duck series was scrapped.

In 2022, Smith guest starred as himself on the Nickelodeon sitcom Warped!, in the episode "Plagiarized!"; in the episode, Smith announces to the lead characters what his new film would be, and the two leads believe Smith stole their similar idea and try to stop him.

=== Abandoned and stalled TV and film projects ===
In 1996, Smith worked on a script for a planned Superman film tentatively titled Superman Lives. He wrote several drafts but was dropped from the project when Tim Burton was hired to direct and brought his own team to write the script; Burton's attempt was later abandoned as well. Smith publicly discussed his experience working on the script at a Q&A session at Clark University shown on the 2002 DVD An Evening with Kevin Smith. In the Q&A, he said the experience was positive overall, since he loves Superman and was paid well. But he listed a number of unusual demands that producer Jon Peters made, including that Superman not be shown flying or wearing tights, and that he should battle a giant spider at the end of the film. Smith noted that he went to see the 1999 film Wild Wild West, which Peters produced, and was surprised to see a giant mechanical spider at the end of the film, presumably Peters's handiwork. Smith's description of his experience gained a life of its own, with film critic A.O. Scott of The New York Times calling it "extraordinary". In the 2007 direct-to-DVD animated film Superman: Doomsday, Smith has a cameo as an onlooker in a crowd that alludes to this anecdote: after Superman defeats Toyman's giant mechanical robot, Smith scoffs, "Yeah, like we really needed him to defeat that giant spider. Heh. Lame!"

In the early '00s, Smith was said to be writing Fletch Won, a prequel to the Chevy Chase film Fletch, and was set to direct with Jason Lee in the lead role, but the plans ultimately came to nothing. Smith cited Miramax not seeing Lee's box-office appeal (in an Entertainment Weekly article covering the delays, Smith claimed Harvey Weinstein continually refused it personally or suggested he focus more on the disguises of the character in a matter similar to Austin Powers, Smith admitting incredulity that Harvey refused even after Lee was frequently seen in billboards and posters in the city at the time, to promote his new show My Name is Earl, but admitting that Harvey's vision for the film clearly did not include Lee) as a reason for its abandonment. For a time, Ben Affleck was considered for the role, with Chase framing the action as the narrator, looking back on his early adventures.

In 2004, Smith wrote a screenplay for a film adaptation of The Green Hornet, and announced that he intended to direct it. The project died after the poor box office of Jersey Girl; the screenplay was later turned into a Green Hornet comic book miniseries. (A live-action film adaptation, The Green Hornet, was released in 2011, with no involvement from Smith.)

At the 2007 San Diego Comic-Con, it was announced that Smith would write and direct an episode of the Heroes spin-off Heroes: Origins, but the project was canceled because of the 2007 Writers Guild of America strike.

Smith planned to direct a hockey drama-comedy based on Warren Zevon's song "Hit Somebody (The Hockey Song)". The song, about a hockey player famous for fighting in the rink, was co-written by Mitch Albom, who worked with Smith on the project. Smith announced at the 2011 Sundance premiere of Red State that Hit Somebody would be the last film he directed, but that he would continue to tell stories in other media. In August 2011, Hit Somebody was announced as a two-part film titled Hit Somebody: Home and Hit Somebody: Away, with part one rated PG-13 and part two rated R, but later it became one film again. In December 2012, Smith announced that, due to difficulties finding funding, Hit Somebody would be a six-part miniseries on an as-yet unknown network. Smith announced in March 2015 that Hit Somebody would film from September to Christmas 2015, but this did not happen.

On March 12, 2015, Smith said he would film Clerks III in May 2015, followed in early 2016 by Moose Jaws and Anti-Claus (a story inspired by the Krampus tradition), which he confirmed the next day.

On April 8, 2015, Smith said that Mallrats 2 would instead be his next film. Most of the original film's cast (16 of the 18) signed on to appear in the sequel. In June 2016, Smith revealed that because Universal owns the rights to the Mallrats title a sequel would not be made; instead, it would be turned into a ten-episode TV series produced by Universal Television. He also confirmed that the film's entire cast would reprise their roles in the series. Toward the end of the month, Smith announced that he had closed a deal with Universal Television to pitch the series to networks and streaming services in August.

In January 2016, Smith wrapped production on a pilot episode for a planned half-hour comedy series, Hollyweed. He wrote and directed the pilot, which starred Smith and Donnell Rawlings, along with Kristin Bauer van Straten, Frankie Shaw, Jason Mewes, Ralph Garman, Adam Brody, Hina Abdullah, Pete Pietrangeliand and Harley Quinn Smith. The pilot was not picked up. In July 2018, it was released as the inaugural pilot on the new TV crowdsourcing site Rivit TV, in hopes of getting funded as a web series.

In May 2016, Smith announced that he was adapting the 1984 film The Adventures of Buckaroo Banzai Across the 8th Dimension for television through MGM and said he and the company were shopping it around to networks. In July 2016, it was revealed that Amazon Studios was close to closing a deal to produce the series, but in November 2016, during a Facebook Live Stream, Smith said he would walk away from the series after MGM filed a lawsuit against the original creators, but would be willing to come back on board if they wanted him.

=== Acting roles ===
As an actor, Smith is best known for his role as Silent Bob in Clerks, Mallrats, Chasing Amy, Dogma, Jay and Silent Bob Strike Back, Clerks II, Jay and Silent Bob Reboot, and Clerks III. He made a cameo appearance in the horror film Scream 3, and was featured along with Jason Mewes in several Degrassi: The Next Generation episodes, including a special, "Jay and Silent Bob Do Degrassi" (also as a fictional version of himself).

Smith played the role of Paul, a cynical divorced man, in a Showtime television series pilot, Manchild, filmed in December 2006. It was not picked up by the network.

From 1995 to 1999, Smith played small roles in the View Askew films Drawing Flies, Vulgar, and Big Helium Dog.

In 2001, he appeared in friend Jeff Anderson's film Now You Know.

In 2003, Smith appeared in a cameo role as coroner Jack Kirby in the film Daredevil. In 2006, he voiced the Moose in the CGI cartoon Doogal.

In early 2005, Smith appeared in three episodes of the Canadian-made teen drama Degrassi: The Next Generation. He wrote his own dialogue for the episodes. An avid fan of the original Degrassi series Degrassi Junior High and Degrassi High, Smith references them in some of his early films. In the episodes, portraying a fictionalized version of himself, he visited the school to work on the fictional film Jay and Silent Bob Go Canadian, Eh! All three episodes were collected on the DVD Jay and Silent Bob Do Degrassi. Smith and Mewes reappeared in two episodes the following season, in which they returned to Degrassi for the Toronto premiere of the movie. Smith also appeared in the 2009 made-for-TV movie Degrassi Goes Hollywood.

In 2007, Smith appeared in a number of films, co-starring as Sam in Catch and Release, starring Jennifer Garner, and appearing as The Warlock, a hacker, in the fourth installment of the Die Hard franchise, Live Free or Die Hard. At year's end, he appeared briefly in friend and fellow writer-director Richard Kelly's Southland Tales, in which he played the legless conspiracy theorist General Simon Theory. The same year, Smith did voicework for the CGI film TMNT as a diner chef and was seen as Rusty (a friend of lead Jason Mewes) in Bottoms Up with co-star Paris Hilton.

Smith cameoed in the second-season premiere of the sitcom Joey, playing himself, on an episode of Law & Order (2000, episode "Black, White and Blue"), Duck Dodgers (2003 as Hal Jordan, voice only) and Yes, Dear (2004, as himself and as Silent Bob behind the end credits). He appeared in the second episode of season two of Veronica Mars, playing a store clerk. Before it aired, Smith watched the show's first season and raved about it in his "online diary", calling it one of the best shows in the history of television.

Smith does a voice cameo in Superman: Doomsday as a bystander. He had a cameo appearance as "Bob the Security Guard" alongside Jason Mewes as "Jay the Security Guard" on The Flash episode, "Null and Annoyed", which he also directed.

Smith played himself in the video game Lego Batman 3: Beyond Gotham as a playable character.

Smith appears as himself in Call of Duty: Infinite Warfare, as a cameo and a playable character in the map Rave in the Redwoods.

In 2017, he appeared as himself in the animated film Teen Titans: The Judas Contract from the DC Universe Animated Original Movies series.

Smith had a voice cameo in Star Wars: The Force Awakens, and an on-screen cameo in Star Wars: The Rise of Skywalker.

=== Q&A documentaries and other specials ===
Smith has appeared in five Q&A documentaries: An Evening with Kevin Smith (2002), An Evening with Kevin Smith 2: Evening Harder (2006), Sold Out: A Threevening with Kevin Smith (2007), Kevin Smith: Too Fat for 40 (2010) and Kevin Smith: Burn in Hell (2012). All five have been released on DVD, and the last two were broadcast on the cable channel Epix.

The first is a collection of filmed appearances at American colleges, while the sequel was shot at two Q&A shows held in Toronto and London. The third and fourth were filmed in Red Bank, New Jersey at the Count Basie Theater on Smith's 37th and 40th birthdays, respectively. The fifth was filmed in Austin, Texas at the Paramount Theater. The first two DVD sets were released by Sony Home Video, while the third was put out by the Weinstein Company.

A stand-up special, entitled Kevin Smith: Silent But Deadly, filmed a mere hour before Smith's heart attack, premiered in 2018 on the cable channel Showtime and was later released to DVD.

Smith appears with Marvel Comics' Stan Lee in Marvel Then & Now: An Evening With Stan Lee and Joe Quesada, hosted by Kevin Smith. The film is similar in tone to the Evening with Kevin Smith series. Proceeds from the film benefit The Hero Initiative, a charitable organization that aids ill or aging comic book creators.

=== Other film and television appearances ===
After an August 2001 appearance on The Tonight Show with Jay Leno to promote Jay and Silent Bob Strike Back, Smith returned to the show for monthly segments as a correspondent. The "Roadside Attractions" segments featured him traveling to places around the country, including Howe Caverns in upstate New York and the Pike Place Fish Market in Seattle. At least 12 of these segments were aired, and Smith regularly appeared on the program to introduce the pre-taped pieces. Five of the segments were also included on the Jersey Girl DVD.

Smith appeared in the 2006 mtvU show Sucks Less with Kevin Smith. The show gives college students ideas for things to do on the weekends.

In 2006, Smith guest reviewed on Ebert & Roeper, in place of Roger Ebert, who was recovering from thyroid cancer treatment. These spots were notable for the arguments between Smith and Richard Roeper over certain films, with Smith often citing Roeper's negative review of Jersey Girl to discredit his review of the film at hand. On one appearance, Smith compared Craig Brewer's Black Snake Moan to the works of William Faulkner.

Smith was featured as one of the interview subjects in This Film Is Not Yet Rated, a 2006 documentary about the Motion Picture Association of America's process of rating films. Smith discussed how Jersey Girl receiving an R rating, on the basis of a conversation two characters in that film have about masturbation, which MPAA head Joan Graves told Smith she would not feel comfortable having her 16-year-old daughter watching. Smith's response was to question whether Graves' daughter had not already masturbated or learned about masturbation, arguing that his film was not teaching 16-year-olds anything they did not already know.

Smith teamed with AMC and The Weinstein Company to co-host a late night talk show with Greg Grunberg, Geeking Out, which premiered in July 2016, covering San Diego Comic-Con with 8 subsequent episodes running weekly.

In February 2019, he made his second appearance on The Big Bang Theory in season 12 episode 16, "The D&D Vortex", alongside other guests stars, Kareem Abdul-Jabbar, William Shatner, and Joe Manganiello in a storyline where they get together at the home of recurring star Wil Wheaton, to play Dungeons & Dragons. His first appearance was in season 8 episode 20, "The Fortification Implementation", when he joins Wil Wheaton on a podcast, voice only.

On November 16, 2019, Amazon Prime published "Bonus: Kevin Smith Explains The Expanse" as a forerunner to series 4 of The Expanse, in which Smith helps explain the action that unfolded during the first three seasons. Two days later, it was published on YouTube.

=== Public appearances ===
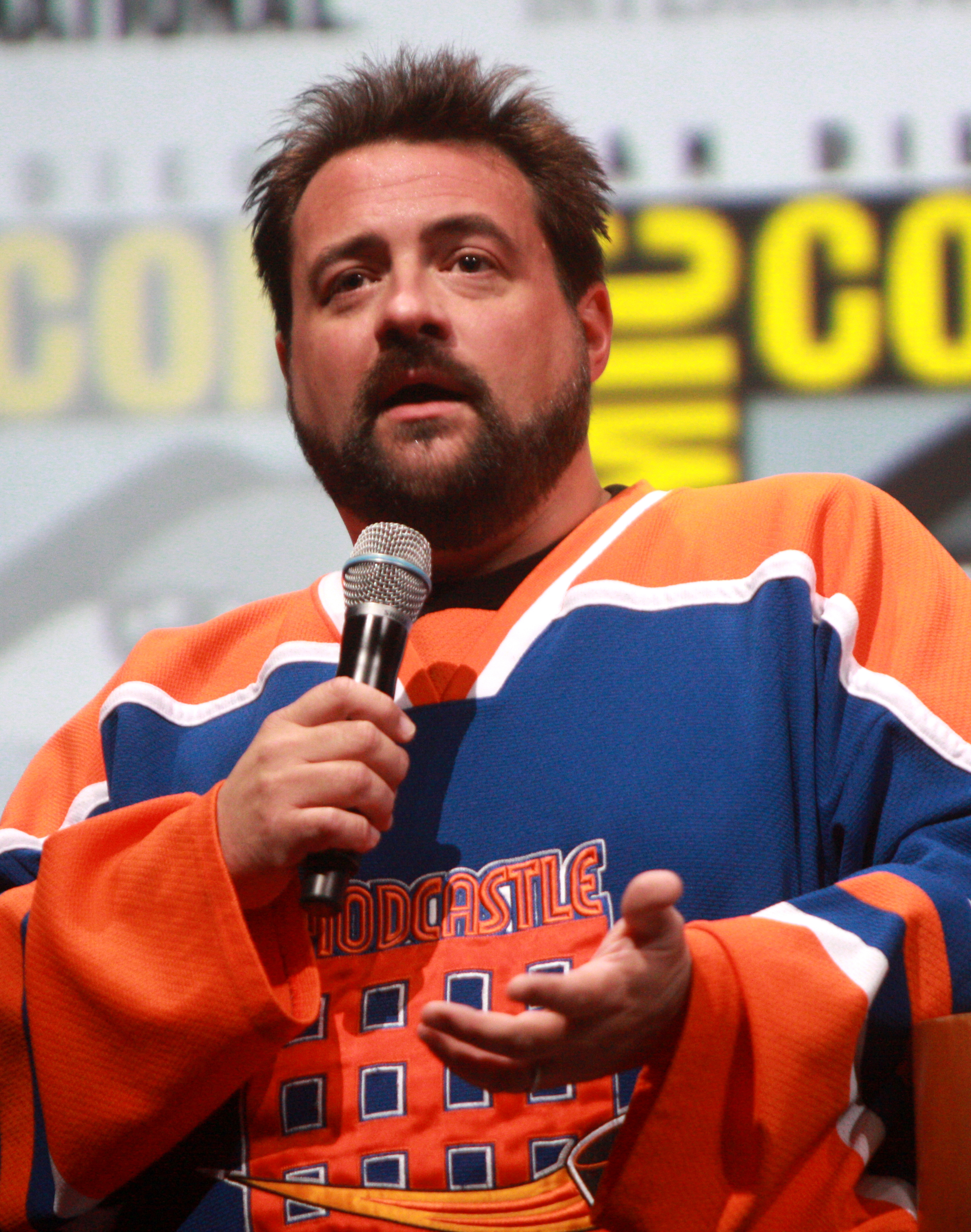
Smith speaking at the 2013 San Diego Comic-Con

Smith's longest Q&A session took place April 2, 2005, at the Count Basie Theatre in Red Bank, New Jersey. The sold-out event was over seven hours long, took place from 8 pm through 3 am (which due to daylight saving time, was actually 4 am). Following the Q&A, he opened Jay and Silent Bob's Secret Stash for a meet-and-greet with the numerous remaining audience members, which ended around 6:30 am. Smith then hopped on a plane and did another Q&A at the Raue Center for the Arts in Crystal Lake, Illinois, that night. Planned for two hours, it lasted just over five hours, ending a little after 1 am Central time.

Smith made sold-out appearances at Carnegie Hall in 2009 and the Sydney Opera House in 2010.

=== On the Internet ===
Smith has a website, The View Askewniverse, which went online in late 1995. He has an online blog, "My Boring-Ass Life", the contents of which were published in a book by the same name. Jay and Silent Bob Strike Back's fictional website MoviePoopShoot.com became real in 2002. It became Quick Stop Entertainment and was the home of SModcast until it was sold and SModcast moved to a dedicated website SModcast.com, which carries the other SModcast network podcasts in early 2010.

On February 5, 2007, Smith and Scott Mosier began SModcast, a regular comedy podcast. SModcast has since spawned into a podcast network called the SModcast podcast network which began in 2010, its own digital radio station called SModcast Internet Radio (S.I.R) in 2011 and an internet television channel SModCo Internet Television (S.I.T.) in 2012.

On June 4, 2012, Smith premiered his Hulu weekly series Spoilers, described as an "anti-movie review" series, where Smith takes a group of people to a new film and has them comment on what they have seen. Other segments on the show include interviews with celebrities, and the "Criterion Lounge", where Smith discusses a Criterion Collection film available on DVD and the Hulu Plus service.

On December 14, 2015, Smith began posting his Fatman on Batman series on YouTube.

In late 2015, Smith and Jason Mewes began the web series What's in the Box? on the Screen Junkies website, through the site's streaming service.

== Jay and Silent Bob's Secret Stash ==
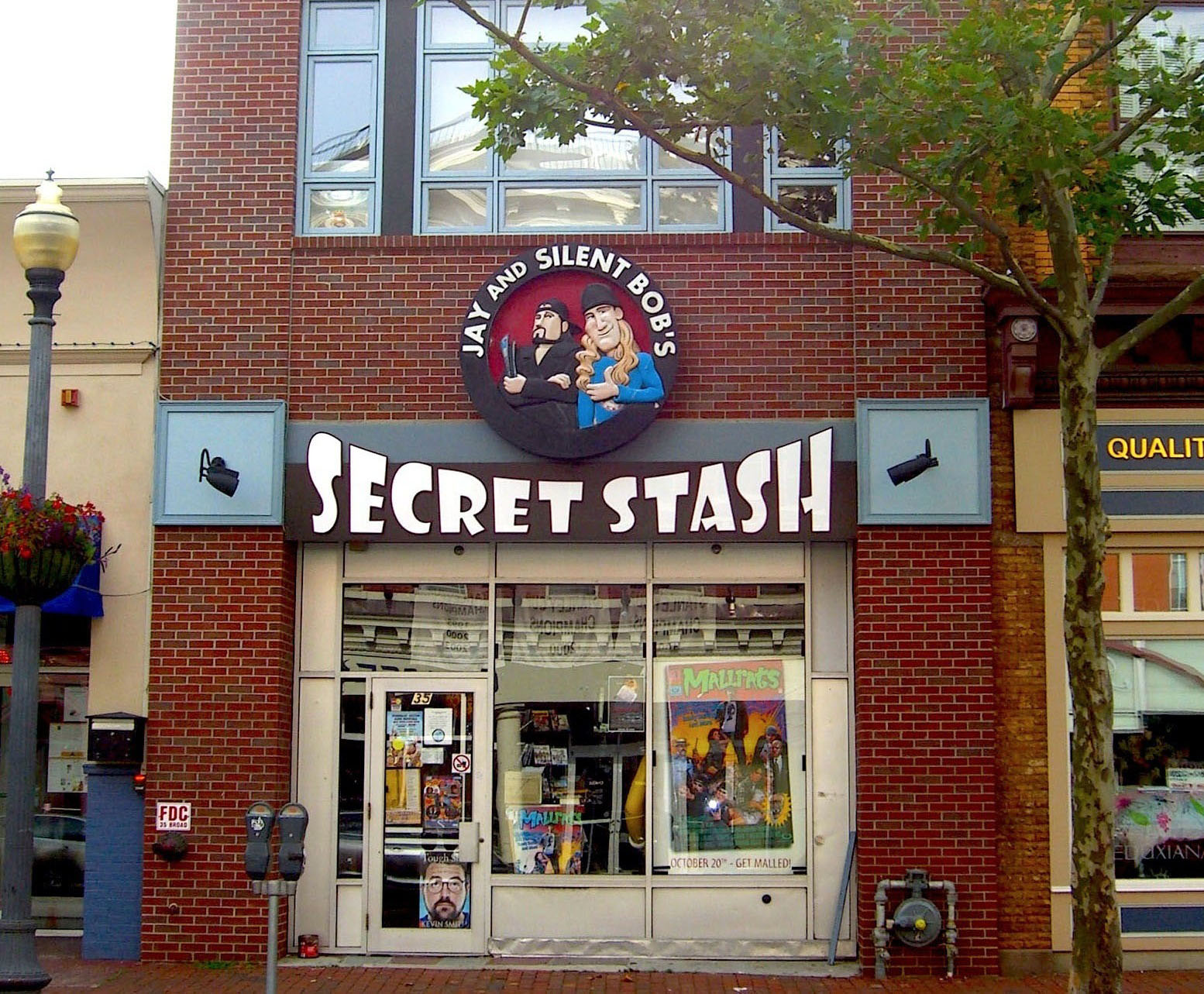
Jay and Silent Bob's Secret Stash in Red Bank, New Jersey

Smith owns and operates Jay and Silent Bob's Secret Stash in Red Bank, New Jersey, a comic book store largely dedicated to merchandise related to his films and comics. He purchased the original store in January 1997 for $30,000, using the money he earned from Clerks. The current location is its third. The original store was moved to a defunct ice cream parlor at 35 Broad St. after Smith sold the Monmouth Street property. The New Jersey location was managed by Smith's long-time friend Walt Flanagan, who appears frequently in Smith's films. On November 25, 2020, Smith announced on his Twitter account that he was closing the Red Bank store at 35 Broad Street on December 28, and moving the store down the block to a long-vacant corner location at 65 Broad Street. The new location opened on February 22, 2021.

A second Secret Stash in the Westwood section of Los Angeles was opened in September 2004 and was managed by long-time friend and associate Bryan Johnson, who has appeared in Smith's films as Steve-Dave. Smith had announced that he would close after his lease expired and Johnson wanted to resign, but eventually relocated to Laser Blazer, a now-defunct laserdisc and DVD store in Los Angeles. In January 2009, the Los Angeles store closed, leaving the Red Bank store as Smith's only operating store.

== Personal life ==
After the success of his first films, Smith moved to Los Angeles, though he felt homesick due to being away from Red Bank, New Jersey. He dated actress Joey Lauren Adams, and declared his desire to marry her in Time magazine. Smith and Adams' relationship was tested by their working together on Chasing Amy, and the two had a heated argument while on the film's set. They broke up in June 1997.

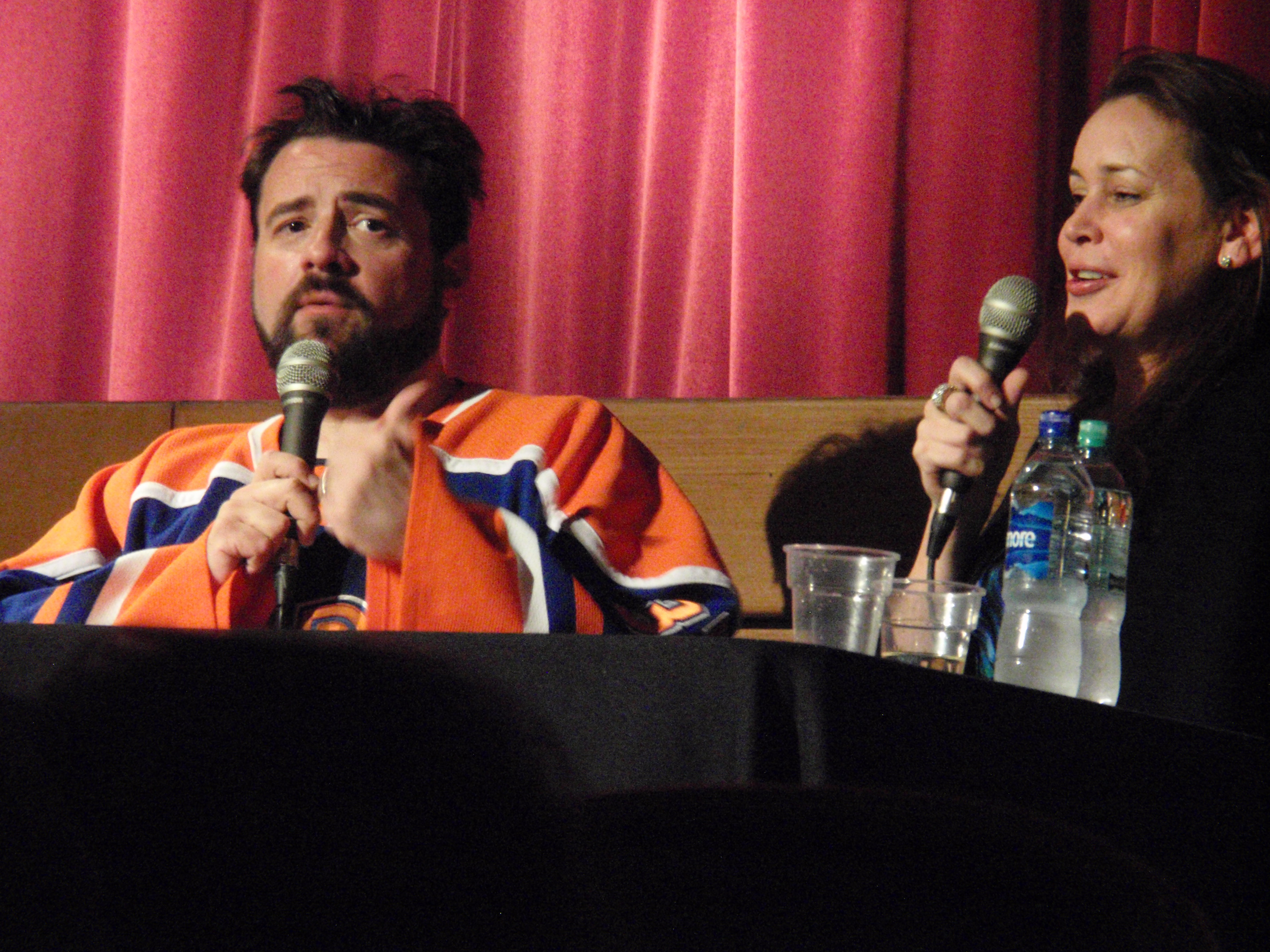
Kevin Smith and Jennifer Schwalbach Smith in September 2011

Smith is married to Jennifer Schwalbach Smith, whom he met while she was interviewing him for USA Today. They got married at Skywalker Ranch on April 25, 1999. He photographed her for a nude pictorial in Playboy. Their daughter, Harley Quinn Smith, was born June 26, 1999, and was named after the character from Batman: The Animated Series. They live in the Hollywood Hills in a house Smith purchased from his longtime friend Ben Affleck in 2003.

Smith is an avid hockey fan and supports the New Jersey Devils. He is also a fan of the Edmonton Oilers.

=== Health ===
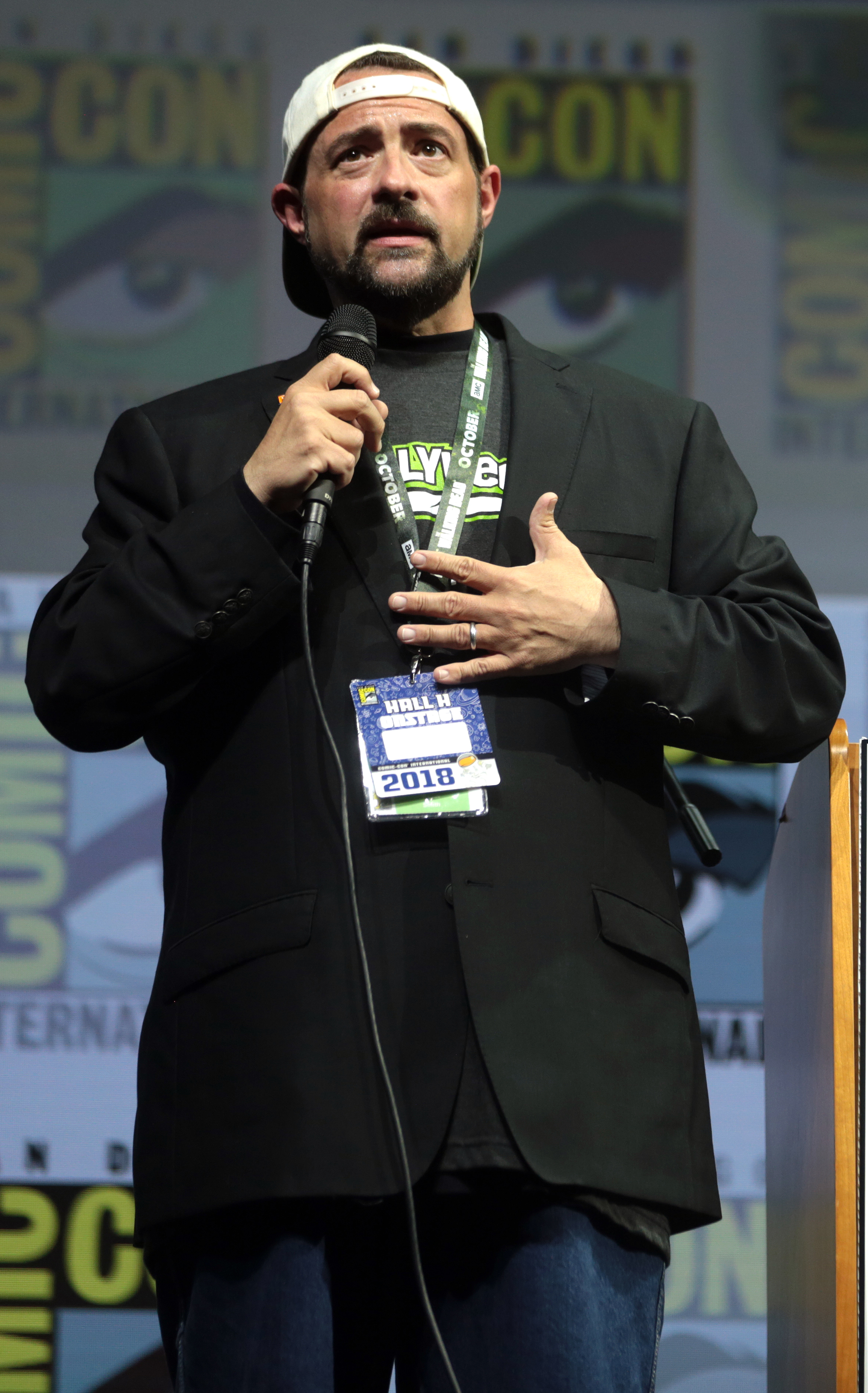
Smith in 2018, several months after his heart attack and having lost significant weight via a vegan diet

Smith never smoked until his debut film, Clerks, in which he used the cigarettes as a prop, but did not inhale. He quit smoking cigarettes in 2008, when he took up smoking cannabis after working with Seth Rogen on Zack and Miri Make a Porno.

Smith has had a history of yo-yo dieting. He lost 50 pounds (23 kg) upon meeting his wife. During production of Clerks II in 2005, he went from 319 pounds (145 kg) to 269 pounds (122 kg). After watching Fed Up, he eliminated sugar from his diet and took up juice fasts in 2014, lowering his weight from 330 pounds (150 kg) to 240 pounds (110 kg).

On February 25, 2018, after performing a stand-up comedy show at the Alex Theatre in Glendale, California, Smith suffered a severe heart attack caused by a total blockage of the left anterior descending artery. An ambulance rushed him to the nearby Glendale Adventist Medical Center for emergency surgery, from which he recovered. Following the episode, his doctor told him he needed to lose another 50 pounds (23 kg). He adopted a vegan diet, also joining Weight Watchers and becoming a paid spokesperson for the brand.

=== Religious beliefs ===
Though raised Catholic, Smith began to become disillusioned about his beliefs in his early 20s, and came to see Catholic Mass as "dry and lip-servicey". Seeking advice, Smith spoke to a priest, who analogized faith to liquid filling a shot glass, and explained that the glass grows in size as a person grows older, and thus the same knowledge that satisfies a person as a child can be insufficient as an adult.

Smith researched Christianity thoroughly, explored other religions, read the Biblical apocrypha, and tried joining a Pentecostal congregation. The thoughts and ideas he explored during this time formed the inspiration for his film Dogma, the beginning of which features characters using the shot glass metaphor used by the priest. Though Smith still regularly attended Mass as late as 1998, he stated on "Back to the Well", a feature on the Clerks II documentary, that he only goes to Mass on the day before he starts production of a film, and the day before it premieres. In September 2014, Smith said that he believed in God, stating: "Proof of God is that I have a career."

In a 2015 interview, Smith said that he had left both Catholicism and theism behind, citing the death of his dog. He said that upon the dog's death, he realized that dogs do not have religious beliefs. This in turn made him decide that religion was something meant to comfort children who were afraid of death. As an adult, Smith decided he no longer needed religion if his dog did not. When asked about his religious beliefs in 2017, Smith said that he "believes in people".

=== Philanthropy ===
Smith co-founded "The Wayne Foundation", a charity supporting women affected by human trafficking and exploitation in 2010; as of 2025 it had its tax exempt status revoked by the IRS due to failure to file for 3 consecutive years. In February 2019, he donated some of his previously worn jerseys to be auctioned off for the charity.

In 2018, Vancouver Film School announced three "Kevin Smith Scholarships" in Acting, Writing and Film Production covering full tuition. Thirteen partial scholarships were awarded, funded by Smith. He personally selected the recipients from over nine hundred applications.

== Filmography ==
Directed features
Year	Title	Distributor
1994	Clerks	Miramax Films
1995	Mallrats	Gramercy Pictures
1997	Chasing Amy	Miramax Films
1999	Dogma	Lions Gate Films
2001	Jay and Silent Bob Strike Back	Miramax Films
2004	Jersey Girl	Miramax Films
2006	Clerks 2	Metro-Goldwyn-Mayer
2008	Zack and Miri Make a Porno	The Weinstein Company
2010	Cop Out	Warner Bros. Pictures
2011	Red State	SModcast Pictures/Lionsgate
2014	Tusk	A24
2016	Yoga Hosers	Invincible Pictures
2019	Jay and Silent Bob Reboot	Saban Films
2022	KillRoy Was Here	Legendao
2022	Clerks III	Lionsgate
2024	The 4:30 Movie	Saban Films

== Recognition ==
In 2019, Clerks was selected by the Library of Congress for preservation in the United States National Film Registry for being "culturally, historically, or aesthetically significant".

== Bibliography ==
=== View Askewniverse ===
- Oni Press:
  - Oni Double Feature (anthology):
    - "Walt Flanagan's Dog" (with Matt Wagner, in #1, 1998)
    - "The Derris Affair" (with Mike Allred, in #12, 1999)
  - Clerks: The Comic Books (tpb, 112 pages, 2000, ISBN 0-9667127-8-1) collects:
    - Clerks: The Comic Book (with Jim Mahfood, one-shot, 1998)
    - Clerks Holiday Special (with Jim Mahfood, 1998)
    - Clerks: The Lost Scene (with Phil Hester, one-shot, 1999)
  - Jay and Silent Bob #1–4 (with Duncan Fegredo, 1998–1999) collected as Jay and Silent Bob: Chasing Dogma (tpb, 112 pages, 1999, ISBN 0-9667127-3-0)
- Bluntman and Chronic (with Michael Avon Oeming and Neil Vokes; includes "The Derris Affair", graphic novel, 96 pages, Image, 2001, ISBN 1-58240-208-6)
- Tales from the Clerks: "Where's the Beef?" (with Jim Mahfood, new story for the collection, tpb, 400 pages, 2006, Graphitti Designs, ISBN 0-936211-78-4)
  - In addition to the new story, this collection reprints all of the View Askewniverse comics published by Oni Press and Image between 1998 and 2001.
  - Graphitti Designs also released "Where's the Beef?" with some non-comics extras as a standalone, WWCC-exclusive one-shot titled Tales from the Clerks II (2006)
- Jay and Silent Bob's Blueprints for Destroying Everything (co-written by Smith and Jason Mewes, illustrated by Steve Stark, 112 pages, Gallery Books, 2014, ISBN 1-4767-1422-3)

=== Marvel Comics ===
- Daredevil (Marvel Knights):
  - Daredevil #0 (with Joe Quesada, 17-panel cybercomic, 1998)
  - Daredevil vol. 2 #1–8, ½: "Guardian Devil" (with Joe Quesada, 1998–1999) collected as Daredevil: Guardian Devil (hc, 232 pages, 2008, ISBN 0-7851-3438-7; tpb, 2010, ISBN 0-7851-4143-X)
  - Daredevil/Bullseye: The Target #1 (of 4) (with Glenn Fabry — and Adam Kubert as the artist for the following issue, 2003)
- Heroes: "A Hero's Thoughts" (short poem with an illustration by Joe Quesada, one-page segment in the magazine-sized benefit comic, 2001)
- A Moment of Silence: "Periphery" (with John Romita, Jr., anthology one-shot, 2002)
- Spider-Man/Black Cat: The Evil That Men Do #1–6 (with Terry Dodson, 2002–2006) collected as Spider-Man/Black Cat: The Evil That Men Do (hc, 176 pages, 2006, ISBN 0-7851-1095-X; tpb, 2007, ISBN 0-7851-1079-8)
  - This limited series (initially announced as a one-shot) was supposed to lead in to an ongoing Black Cat series and a run on The Amazing Spider-Man, both to be written by Smith and published concurrently.
  - As a result of the three-year delay between issues #3 and 4 of The Evil That Men Do and the changes in Spider-Man's status quo during that period, neither project eventually materialized.
- Giant-Size Amazing Spider-Man #1 (writer, one-shot, with Giuseppe Camuncoli, June 2025)
- Jay & Silent Bob: Jays of Future Past #1 (writer, one-shot, with Giuseppe Camuncoli, June 2026)

=== DC Comics ===
- Green Arrow vol. 3 (with Phil Hester, 2001–2002) collected as:
  - Quiver (collects #1–10, hc, 232 pages, 2002, ISBN 1-56389-802-0; tpb, 2003, ISBN 1-56389-965-5)
  - Sounds of Violence (collects #11–15, hc, 128 pages, 2003, ISBN 1-56389-976-0; tpb, 2004, ISBN 1-84023-759-7)
  - Green Arrow by Kevin Smith (collects #1–15, Absolute Edition, 384 pages, 2015, ISBN 1-4012-5548-5; tpb, 2016, ISBN 1-4012-6526-X)
- The Brave and the Bold vol. 3 (with Phil Hester, unreleased ongoing series — initially announced in 2001)
- Batman:
  - Batman: Cacophony #1–3 (with Walt Flanagan, 2008–2009) collected as Batman: Cacophony (hc, 144 pages, 2009, ISBN 1-4012-2418-0; tpb, 2010, ISBN 1-4012-2419-9)
  - Batman: The Widening Gyre #1–6 (of 12) (with Walt Flanagan, 2009–2010) collected as Batman: The Widening Gyre (hc, 200 pages, 2010, ISBN 1-4012-2875-5; tpb, 2011, ISBN 1-4012-2876-3)
  - Batman: Bellicosity (with Walt Flanagan, unreleased 6-issue limited series repurposed from the second arc of Batman: The Widening Gyre — initially announced in 2012)
  - Detective Comics #1000: "Manufacture for Use" (with Jim Lee, co-feature, 2019) collected in Batman: 80 Years of the Bat Family (tpb, 400 pages, 2020, ISBN 1-77950-658-9)

=== Dynamite Entertainment ===
- Green Hornet:
  - Green Hornet vol. 3 (with Jonathan Lau, 2010) collected as:
    - Sins of the Father (collects #1–5, hc, 144 pages, 2010, ISBN 1-60690-142-7; tpb, 2010, ISBN 1-60690-191-5)
    - Wearing o' the Green (collects #6–10, hc, 144 pages, 2010, ISBN 1-60690-192-3; tpb, 2011, ISBN 1-60690-193-1)
  - Batman '66 Meets the Green Hornet #1–12 (co-written by Smith and Ralph Garman, art by Ty Templeton, digital, 2014)
    - The series was first published in print as a 6-issue limited series titled Batman '66 Meets the Green Hornet (2014–2015)
    - Collected as Batman '66 Meets the Green Hornet (hc, 144 pages, 2015, ISBN 1-4012-5228-1; tpb, 2015, ISBN 1-4012-5799-2)
- The Bionic Man #1–10 (script by Phil Hester on the basis of Smith's unused The Six Million Dollar Man screenplay, art by Jonathan Lau, 2011–2012)
- Yoga Hosers: A Sundance Super Special: "When Colleens Collide!" (with Jeff Quigley, 2016)

=== Other publishers ===
- The New York Times: "My Date with Destiny!" (with Joe Quesada, webcomic, The New York Times Company, 2001)
- Hit-Girl: Season Two #1–4: "Hollywood" (with Pernille Ørum, Image, 2019) collected as Hit-Girl in Hollywood (tpb, 112 pages, 2019, ISBN 1-5343-1225-0)
- Masters of the Universe: Revelation #1–4 (script by Tim Sheridan from a story by Smith and Rob David, art by Mindy Lee, Dark Horse, 2021)

=== Non-fiction ===
- Silent Bob Speaks: The Collected Writings of Kevin Smith (sc, 352 pages, Miramax Books, 2005, ISBN 1-4013-5973-6)
- My Boring-Ass Life: The Uncomfortably Candid Diary of Kevin Smith (sc, 480 pages, Titan Books, 2007, ISBN 1-84576-538-9)
- Shootin' the Sh*t with Kevin Smith: The Best of SModcast (sc, 384 pages, Titan Books, 2009, ISBN 1-84576-415-3)
- Tough Sh*t: Life Advice from a Fat, Lazy Slob Who Did Good (hc, 480 pages, Gotham Books, 2012, ISBN 1-59240-689-0; sc, 2013, ISBN 1-59240-744-7)

== See also ==
- Kevin Smith's unrealized projects
- Smodcastle Cinemas (Smith-owned movie theater in Atlantic Highlands, New Jersey)

Preceded by Scott Lobdell	Daredevil writer 1998–1999	Succeeded by David Mack
Preceded by Chuck Dixon	Green Arrow writer 2001–2002	Succeeded by Brad Meltzer
