= My Boring Ass Life =

2007 book by Kevin Smith

My Boring Ass Life: The Uncomfortably Candid Diary of Kevin Smith
- Author: Kevin Smith
- Cover artist: Chris Buck
- Language: English
- Genre: Diary, Crime fiction
- Publisher: Titan Books
- Publication date: September 25, 2007
- Publication place: United States
- Media type: Paperback
- Pages: 480
- ISBN: 978-1-84576-538-5
- Preceded by: Silent Bob Speaks
- Followed by: Shootin' the Sh*t with Kevin Smith

My Boring Ass Life: The Uncomfortably Candid Diary of Kevin Smith is the second book composed of writings by filmmaker Kevin Smith, the first being Silent Bob Speaks.

== Plot ==
The title is a reference to Smiths frequently used blog. The book's content is from entries Smith has written about on said blog, from mundane daily activities to a series of writings detailing his friend and frequent featured actor Jason Mewes' heroin addiction. Smith also chronicles the making of and release of his seventh film Clerks II and describes the filming of his acting roles in Catch and Release and Live Free or Die Hard.

=== Running into Various Celebrities ===
Smith talks about his several encounters with many Hollywood stars, both old and upcoming. Once, during his daughter Harley's elementary school Fairy Tale Breakfast party, he ran into Johnny Depp, still wearing part of his Jack Sparrow makeup, who was in-between filming the Pirates of the Caribbean sequels. He also recollects on the time in which he met Burt Reynolds after "stealing" his donuts. An unlikely meeting with Bruce Willis resulted in Smith getting a major supporting part in Willis' film Live Free or Die Hard. In addition, he mentions a humorous encounter Mewes had at a club during the shoot of Jay and Silent Bob Strike Back with Leonardo DiCaprio and Tobey Maguire, who had recently been cast as Spider-Man.

=== Meeting My Wife ===
After realizing it has been seven years to the day they "did it", Smith recounts how he first met his wife, Jennifer Schwalbach Smith. During the promotional tour for his 1999 film Dogma, he was interviewed by Schwalbach ("Jen"), then a reporter for USA Today at the Independent Spirit Awards. Having half a day to kill before he had to go home, they dined on pizza breadsticks before he left for his flight back to New Jersey. A few months later, he met her again, had a few drinks, and they went back to her apartment where they had sex for the first time. At this point, Smith stops and writes, "The rest can be seen in An Evening With Kevin Smith," in which he recounts how he was injured in the act of sex.

=== The Original Idea For Mallrats ===
Lasting about nine pages, Smith talks about how he intended to have a much more elaborate opening prologue/credits scene for his sophomore film Mallrats. In this, T.S Quint, goes on a televised game show and loses after babbling for ages and giving the other team the answer to the question. An altercation with the team ensues, and he accidentally punches the show's host after the team captain ducks his head. According to Smith, the studio felt it was too long, ordered it to be cut, and replaced it with a smaller scene taking place at a party instead. However, that scene was later scrapped during post-production. Due to this setback, as well as some other scenes, including a Silent Bob masturbation joke, he was forced to excise from the script, he feels this hurt the movie's chances for a bigger box office reception. As in Evening With Kevin Smith, he revealed that while he removed the masturbation scene, a similar scene took place in a film released four years later: There's Something About Mary.

=== Me and My Shadow ===
Of all the entries in the book, this section is the longest and probably most serious subject that Smith deals with: his friendship of Jason Mewes and the latter's massive drug addiction. It details his addiction during the filming of Dogma up to his sobriety.

(Mewes eventually relapsed and Smith hosted a weekly podcast to keep him sober)

=== Making Clerks II ===
As in the documentary found on the Clerks II DVD, Smith recounts the process of the film (his "first" true sequel) being made. Several facts are included: the original 1999 script had Dante and Randal working at a Boardwalk Waterfront Pier, how Matt Damon was supposed to appear in Jason Lee's cameo, and convincing original Clerks stars Brian O'Halloran and Jeff Anderson to come back. While O'Halloran was eager to reprise Dante ten years down the road, Anderson was the most difficult to convince to return, but he finally agreed to appear in the film. In addition, Smith details Mewes' embarrassment and reluctance to do a parody of the infamous Buffalo Bill nude-dance scene.

=== Clerks II release ===
Smith writes about the reaction Clerks II got from critics, particularly Joel Siegel. About forty minutes into the film, specifically the scene where Randal orders a donkey show as a going-away present for Dante's bachelor party, Siegel exited the theater rather loudly, allegedly shouting "Time to go! This is the first movie I've walked out on in thirty fucking years!" Despite this incident, Smith felt that "if you can send Joel Siegel screaming from your movie, you've got something good on your hands," because getting a bad review from Siegel (according to Smith, after the review called it "Jerks II") is like "a badge of honor." However, he admits that he was not hurt by the critic's trashing of the film, but rather the manner in which he left it. He states that had Siegel not left the film, the actual donkey show would have been revealed and been funnier. After mentioning his confrontation with the so-called "cum catcher" (in reference to his prominent mustache) on The Opie and Anthony Show, he says he has no animosity towards the critic, but that one should never walk out on a film and ruin it for others. For the next few entries of his diary, he reveals that Clerks II made over thirty million dollars at the domestic box office.

== Reception ==
The week of October 21, 2007, the book reached #32 on The New York Times' paperback nonfiction best-seller list.
