= Silent Bob Speaks =

Book by Kevin Smith

- Author: Kevin Smith
- Subject: Anthology
- Publisher: Miramax Books
- Publication date: April 13, 2005
- Media type: Print Paperback
- Pages: 325 (1st edition)
- ISBN: 1-4013-5973-6
- OCLC: 58731937
- LC Class: PN1993.5.U6 S555 2005
- Followed by: My Boring Ass Life: The Uncomfortably Candid Diary of Kevin Smith

Silent Bob Speaks: The Collected Writings of Kevin Smith is a collection of essays written by screenwriter, director, and comic book author Kevin Smith. The collection comes from sources including Arena Magazine, Details, New Jersey Monthly, and Film Comment. Topics range from polemic assaults on pop culture figures to reflections on Spider-Man and his diagnosis with morbid obesity.

The book features interviews with Tom Cruise and Ben Affleck as well as reports written during the production of his films Jay and Silent Bob Strike Back and Jersey Girl.

Lincoln Cho wrote a positive review on this book.
