= Kevin Smith: Burn in Hell =

- Written by: Kevin Smith
- Directed by: Joey Figueroa; Zak Knutson
- Starring: Kevin Smith
- Original language: English

Production
- Running time: 89 minutes

Original release
- Release: October 22, 2012

Kevin Smith: Burn In Hell is the fifth installment of Kevin Smith's Q&A series and was broadcast on Epix on February 11, 2012.

The special was filmed after a showing of Smith's film Red State at the Paramount Theatre in Austin, Texas, where he answers questions on the making of the film and dealing with the Westboro Baptist Church.

== Reception ==
"Burn in Hell, the fifth installment in the Q&A specials, left me feeling absolutely awe-struck by the deep reverence for life and art and genuinely sage wisdom Smith possesses and shares with his loyal fans."
