= Batman: The Widening Gyre =

Comic book series by Kevin Smith

- Variant cover art for Batman: The Widening Gyre #1 by Gene Ha.

Publication information
- Publisher: DC Comics
- Schedule: Monthly
- Format: Limited series
- Genre: Superhero
- Publication date: October 2009 – July 2010
- No. of issues: 6
- Main character(s): Batman; Baphomet; Silver St. Cloud

Creative team
- Written by: Kevin Smith
- Penciller: Walt Flanagan
- Inker: Art Thibert
- Letterer: Jared K. Fletcher
- Colorist: Art Lyon
- Editor(s): Dan DiDio; Mike Marts; Janelle Siegel

Collected editions
- Hardcover: ISBN 1-4012-2875-5

Batman: The Widening Gyre is the title of a six-issue comic book limited series starring Batman, released August 2009 through July 2010. The series is written by Kevin Smith and illustrated by Walt Flanagan. The title is a reference to the William Butler Yeats poem "The Second Coming".

The series was initially planned as 12 issues, with a long break planned between issues #6 and 7. After issue #6 was published, Smith and Flanagan's work on their reality show, Comic Book Men, extended this planned break further than expected. It was decided in the interim to release the remaining issues as a separate series to be called Batman: Bellicosity, that was due in 2014, but to date, remains unreleased, making the series out of continuity.

== Publication history ==
Batman: The Widening Gyre was written by Kevin Smith and illustrated by Walt Flanagan. They both had completed Batman: Cacophony. As Smith explained it, the series was to have 12 issues split into two six-issue books. Book 1 was supposed to run from August 2009 to January 2010 and, after a six-month hiatus, Book 2 from July through December 2010. Book 1 was plagued by several hiatuses and ran to July 2010 and Book 2 was pushed to late 2013. Ultimately, after further delays on Book 2, Smith decided to turn the second half of Batman: The Widening Gyre into a separately titled miniseries called Batman: Bellicosity. As delays continued the series has now been rendered out of continuity.

== Plot ==
Following a tip from Nightwing, Batman discovers Arkham Asylum is completely overgrown with plant life. Upon investigation, Batman finds that Poison Ivy is currently in a dispute with Etrigan the Demon, and she has been turning Arkham Asylum into a fortress to protect herself. Batman and Etrigan do battle, but Batman is on the losing end. As Etrigan is about to deliver the deathblow, Batman is saved at the last minute by a new masked hero: a figure clad all in black with a silver cape, armed with a crossbow, and wearing a wooden mask resembling the head of a goat.

A week later, the mysterious new masked hero again aids Batman in apprehending a pedophile who has been stalking an amusement park. Upon returning home, Batman changes back into Bruce Wayne, and Alfred has a surprise for him: Silver St. Cloud is waiting for Bruce at the manor. St. Cloud's senator husband has recently died, and with a proper mourning period having passed, she is eager to rekindle her romance with Wayne. They quickly make plans to get reacquainted. However, the reappearance of St. Cloud and the mysterious new masked hero are enough to distract Batman when he is on patrol that night, allowing Cornelius Stirk to get the drop on him. Robin is easily able to save Batman.

The next day, Wayne and St. Cloud retreat to St. Cloud's private island, where they spend the day getting reacquainted. That night, back in Gotham City, the mysterious new masked hero assists Batman in defeating the Black Spider. The mysterious new masked hero finally introduces himself as Baphomet. Batman admits to himself that Baphomet has been helpful so far, and could be an asset in his war on crime. Things soon fall into a comfortable routine for Batman: days with St. Cloud on her private island, and nights in Gotham City fighting crime with Baphomet.

The routine is soon shattered, however, as Aquaman discovers Wayne and St. Cloud on the island. With their privacy violated, Wayne and St. Cloud begin spending more time in Gotham City. Batman begins growing closer to Baphomet as well, but Batman is uncomfortable with how casually Baphomet begins unmasking in front of him and revealing his true face. Things get further complicated as Catwoman discovers Batman's relationship with St. Cloud, and begins questioning Batman as to what this means for them.

Wayne and St. Cloud soon spend a night away from Gotham, leaving the city in the care of Baphomet and Robin. Robin also admits his admiration of Baphomet's skill, but Robin shares Batman's unease at how casual Baphomet is at removing his mask and revealing his true identity. Upon returning to Gotham, Batman witnesses Baphomet single-handedly taking down the Joker, which convinces Batman that Baphomet is ready to become his full-time partner. Batman follows Baphomet home that night, where Baphomet reveals that he is married with two children, and that he chose the life of a crime fighter when his younger brother was killed by a masked criminal.

Batman gives St. Cloud a tour of Superman's Fortress of Solitude, where he presents St. Cloud with a rare orchid that he had botanists (implied to be the Swamp Thing) develop just for her. From there, Batman and St. Cloud head to the Justice League Watchtower, where Batman unmasks and proposes to St. Cloud. She gladly accepts, and they return to Gotham City. As Alfred takes St. Cloud back to her home, her final words to Batman haunt him, and he gives chase. After stopping Alfred and St. Cloud on the roadside, Batman forcibly plucks one of St. Cloud's hairs, and runs a DNA test on it to confirm that she is human. Embarrassed by his paranoia, Batman confesses that he thought St. Cloud was an android created by Professor Ivo as part of a trap. St. Cloud admits that, because of Batman's lifestyle, she knows their relationship will never be normal, and she forgives Batman.

That night, Batman and Baphomet are battling crime on the streets. Batman and Baphomet break up a fight between Deadshot and Catwoman, and Catwoman confesses she set up the fight in order to draw out Batman. Batman tells Catwoman of his engagement, and a heartbroken Catwoman disappears into the night. Batman and Baphomet then take down the Calendar Man, and return him to Arkham Asylum. With this done, Batman takes Baphomet back to the Batcave, where he finally reveals his true identity as Bruce Wayne, and introduces Baphomet to St. Cloud. Wayne removes his utility belt and places it on a nearby table, where it makes a unique "ka-klack" sound. Wayne hears someone behind him mimic the "ka-klack" sound. A horrified Batman turns around to discover that Baphomet is, in fact, the villain Onomatopoeia. The book ends on a cliffhanger, as Onomatopoeia begins to slit Silver St. Cloud's throat and imitate the sound.

== Reception ==
Batman: The Widening Gyre received mixed reviews from critics, as many felt that Smith's trademark brand of crude humor felt out of place in a Batman comic. Particular criticism was directed at a scene where Batman confesses to Baphomet that, during an early adventure in his crimefighting career, he misjudged the power of some explosives he was using, and the resulting blast of heat caused Batman to experience a bladder spasm. Baphomet immediately interprets this to mean that Batman wet his pants.

== Collected editions ==
The series was collected into a trade paperback:

- The Widening Gyre (collects The Widening Gyre #1–6, 200 pages, hardcover, DC Comics, December 2010, ISBN 1-4012-2875-5, Titan Books, October 2010, ISBN 1-84856-962-9)
