= Tough Sh*t =

2012 book by Kevin Smith

- Author: Kevin Smith
- Language: English
- Subject: Nonfiction, Memoirs
- Publisher: Gotham Books
- Publication date: March 20, 2012
- Publication place: United States
- Media type: Print
- Pages: 263
- ISBN: 9781592406890 (First Edition Hardcover)
- OCLC: 729341536
- LC Class: PN1998.3.S5864 A3 2012

Tough Sh*t: Life Advice from a Fat, Lazy Slob Who Did Good is a 2012 book of memoirs by the writer and filmmaker Kevin Smith, covering a range of topics such as Smith's childhood, early film career, relationships with actors and celebrities, and his public feud with Southwest Airlines. The book placed on The New York Times Best Seller list for nonfiction for two weeks following its release.

In the Comic Book Men episode "Tough Sh*t", Smith promotes the book by doing a signing at Jay & Silent Bob's Secret Stash.
