= Batman: Cacophony =

Comic book series starring Batman

- Cover of Batman: Cacophony 1 (Jan. 2009), art by Adam Kubert

Publication information
- Publisher: DC Comics
- Schedule: Monthly
- Format: Limited series
- Genre: Superhero
- Publication date: November 2008 – January 2009
- No. of issues: 3
- Main character(s): Batman; Onomatopoeia; Joker; Maxie Zeus

Creative team
- Written by: Kevin Smith
- Artist(s): Walt Flanagan and Sandra Hope

Batman: Cacophony is the title of a three-issue comic book limited series starring Batman published by the comic book publishing company DC Comics. The series was written by Kevin Smith with art by Walt Flanagan, and ran from November 2008 through March 2009 due to delays with issue #3. The comic chronicles Batman as he attempts to stop a turf war between the Joker and Maxie Zeus. Batman also encounters a new adversary, the assassin Onomatopoeia.

== History ==
The series featured the villains Onomatopoeia, Maxie Zeus, the Joker, Deadshot, and Victor Zsasz. The first issue was shipped on November 12 with three different covers: two by Adam Kubert (standard cover and 1:50 rarity sketch cover) and one by Bill Sienkiewicz (1:25 rarity variant cover).

The plot involves a turf war between the Joker and Maxie Zeus over a drug Zeus creates using Joker venom, prompting the Joker to retaliate.

== Plot ==
The series opens with Deadshot breaking into Arkham Asylum with the intent to kill the Joker. He is stopped by Onomatopoeia, however, who shoots Deadshot in the head. Onomatopoeia then releases the Joker, leaving him a briefcase of money to help him create mayhem in Gotham City and draw out Batman — Onomatopoeia's actual target. The Joker uses this money to attack Maxie Zeus, who turned Joker's trademark Joker venom into a designer drug.

After foiling Victor Zsasz, Batman meets with Commissioner Gordon at Arkham to investigate the Joker's latest escape. Deadshot is revealed to be still alive, having used a bloodpack and a bulletproof helmet to fake his death. Batman encounters the Joker and Onomatopoeia, and, after doing some research, realizes that Onomatopoeia is attacking non-superpowered vigilantes, and that he is Onomatopoeia's next target. Although Onomatopoeia attempts to lure Batman into a trap with the aid of the Joker, Batman surprises him, using Deadshot's own trick of a bulletproof helmet and a fake bloodpack, only for Onomatopoeia to escape when he stabs the Joker. After a moment of indecision, Batman stays behind and tries to save his archenemy, allowing the other villain to escape. Gordon urges Batman to let the Joker die, arguing that he is not asking Batman to kill the Joker, but merely asking him not to save his enemy. Batman insists that he must do everything he can to save another human being — even one as evil as the Joker.

A few months later, Batman, in his "Matches Malone" disguise and claiming to be a lawyer, goes to the prison hospital to visit the Joker. The Joker has recently come out of a coma, and has been medicated with "an ass-load of mood stablizers and antipsychotics", resulting in a relatively sane state of mind (or the painkillers have merely mellowed him out). Batman realizes he finally has a chance to have a somewhat rational conversation with the Joker, leading him to disguise himself to get into the Joker's room. He asks his foe if he truly wants him dead. When the Joker asks if Batman desires his death, Batman reveals that he saved the Joker because he never again wants to see anyone die; although he does not say as much, it is implied that he is referring to witnessing the murder of his parents. The Joker expresses sympathy for Batman's loss, but informs Batman that he does want to kill him, ultimately saying to him: "I don't hate you 'cause I'm crazy...I'm crazy 'cause I hate you". He then says he will only "retire" as a supervillain when Batman is dead.

== Reception ==
Jesse Schedeen of IGN felt conflicted with the first issue of Cacophony, citing a good script and comparing Smith to Grant Morrison, saying that "[Smith] manages to find a fresh voice for one of the industry's most heavily exposed characters".

Schedeen also wrote that the villains were the focus, with the Joker the most prominent. He criticized Smith's trademark scatological humor and said that Smith's characterization of Batman was "too wordy". Schedeen also states that Flanagan's art varied in trying to portray the Joker's emotions. The overall score Schedeen gave the first issue was an 8.3.

== Podcasts ==
In honor of his annual trip to San Diego Comic-Con, Smith has "dramatized" each of the three issues of the series during special episodes of his podcast Hollywood Babble-On, entitled Hollywood Babble-On Comic Con Theater. Primarily performed by his HB-O co-host Ralph Garman, who used several of his better-known impressions to represent the main characters, both episodes were essentially a read-through of one of the issues of the story. Garman's voicing of the main characters included the "voices" of Adam West as Batman, Ed Wynn as the Joker (initially, this was Garman's impression of Cesar Romero's Joker, but Smith suggested using Wynn's voice instead), Sean Connery as Commissioner Gordon, and Al Pacino as Maxie Zeus. Smith acted as the "omniscient narrator" and voice of Onomatopoeia in both episodes. In the first episode (podcast #43), an audience member was brought up to cover several other minor character roles; in the second episode (podcast #65), Smith brought in voice-over actor/announcer Kyle Hebert to voice Alfred (which he did in a cockney accent somewhat reminiscent of Michael Caine, who played Alfred in Batman Begins, The Dark Knight, and The Dark Knight Rises) and others, and cohort Jason Mewes to voice most of the female characters. Smith and Hebert also voiced two of Zeus' henchmen, as well as other characters in the second episode. The final episode (podcast #104) included Jason Mewes as Commissioner Gordon, a fan as Onomatopoeia alongside Kevin and Ralph. It was stated the next "Comic Con Theater" episodes would be for "Widening Gyre" but that has not happened, yet. Instead they have "dramatized" their co-written Batman '66 Meets the Green Hornet on the Fatman on Batman podcast.
