= Onomatopoeia (character) =

Fictional character in comic books

- Onomatopoeia as depicted in Green Arrow (vol. 3) #13 (April 2002). Art by Matt Wagner.

Publication information
- Publisher: DC Comics
- First appearance: Green Arrow (vol. 3) #12 (March 2002)
- Created by: Kevin Smith (writer); Phil Hester (artist)

In-story information
- Species: Human
- Place of origin: Earth
- Team affiliations: Secret Society of Super Villains
- Notable aliases: Baphomet
- Abilities: Master marksman; Superb athlete, martial artist, and weapons expert; Advanced handgun training; High intellect; Enhanced resilience and durability

Onomatopoeia is a supervillain appearing in American comic books published by DC Comics, usually as an enemy of Green Arrow and Batman. Created by writer Kevin Smith and artist Phil Hester, the character first appeared in Green Arrow (vol. 3) #12 (March 2002).

Daya Vaidya portrayed a female version of the character — Peia Mannheim — in the third season of the television series Superman & Lois.

== Publication history ==
Kevin Smith discussed the character in a 2007 interview:

"When I did Green Arrow, I went with Onomatopoeia for a villain, just because I loved that word, and it kind of formed the character inasmuch as he would say sounds out loud. It only kind of works – I think – on a comic book page because if you have a gun going off, they usually write BLAM! and then you can have, you know, the character saying "BLAM!" in a word balloon, but like if you tried to do that cinematically you can't really rock it. A gun in a film sounds completely different. It doesn't read as BLAM! and so to have a dude say BLAM!...I think it works great in print and on a comic book page. I don't think that character would translate very well outside of that."

== Fictional character biography ==
Onomatopoeia is a serial killer who targets non-superpowered superheroes. His name is derived from the fact that he imitates noises around him, such as dripping taps, gunshots, etc. He shoots Connor Hawke, the second Green Arrow, who is saved by his father Oliver Queen (the first and original Green Arrow). While Connor is undergoing surgery, Onomatopoeia returns to finish the job. He kills several doctors in the operating room, and after his attempt to kill Connor is foiled by Queen and Black Canary, he manages to escape.

Onomatopoeia is recruited by Alexander Luthor Jr.'s Secret Society of Super Villains as part of an army that is sent to conquer the city of Metropolis in Infinite Crisis. A superhero army, backed up by the National Guard, successfully opposes the Society.

Onomatopoeia appears in the 2008 miniseries Batman: Cacophony, which was written by the character's creator Kevin Smith and pencilled by his longtime collaborator and friend Walt Flanagan. Onomatopoeia frees the Joker from Arkham Asylum and gives him money to finance a gang war against Maxie Zeus. In addition, it is revealed that Onomatopoeia has a secret, seemingly normal life as a loving husband and the father of two children, who are unaware of his murderous activities.

In Batman: The Widening Gyre, it is revealed that he has been in disguise as Baphomet, a new vigilante who had been teaming up with Batman. He appears as Baphomet early on, helping Batman defeat Etrigan the Demon and Poison Ivy. He later assists Batman in defeating villains such as Deadshot, Crazy Quilt, and Calendar Man, even unmasking himself in front of Batman to gain his trust. However, as Batman had no idea what Onomatopoeia actually looked like, Onomatopoeia's actions do not reveal the ruse.

=== Rebirth ===
As part of New 52, DC Comics' 2011 reboot of its entire monthly comics line, Onomatopoeia appears in Teen Titans, in which he is shown in a mover's truck packed with explosives on a ferry, apparently in a plot to blow up the boat. However, Red Arrow arrives on the scene, apprehending him on the ferry and driving the truck into the ocean. This is later revealed to have been part of part of Onomatopoeia's plan however, as the fusion bomb in the truck soon detonates in the water, setting off a tidal wave that heads for Star City.

While the arriving Teen Titans and Red Arrow work to save the city from the incoming tidal wave, Onomatopoeia breaks into Queen Industries to steal high-grade weapons. As the team eventually saves the city, Onomatopoeia attacks them with the weaponry he stole. However, Robin and Kid Flash get around the firing bullets and defeat him.

== Powers and abilities ==
Onomatopoeia is an athlete, martial artist and weapons expert. He invariably carries two semiautomatic handguns, a sniper rifle, and an army knife. He appears to be quite intelligent, having orchestrated the Joker's escape to draw out Batman, as well as avoiding capture by giving the Joker a near-fatal wound, causing Batman to be distracted. His marksmanship has been shown to rival even Deadshot's.

It remains unrevealed whether or not Onomatopoeia is a metahuman, however, it has been noted by Green Arrow that he is enhanced in some way. He has been able to survive seemingly lethal injuries without harm.

== In other media ==
=== Television ===
- Onomatopoeia appears in the "Green Arrow" segment of DC Nation Shorts.
- A female character based on Onomatopoeia named Peia Mannheim appears in the third season of Superman & Lois, portrayed by Daya Vaidya. Mannheim is the wife of Bruno Mannheim and a member of Intergang who is able to manipulate sound.
- Onomatopoeia appears in the Batman: Caped Crusader episode "Moving Target", voiced by Reid Scott. This version is the leader of a group of similarly dressed assassins.

=== Miscellaneous ===
Onomatopoeia appears in Arrow: Season 2.5 #12.
