= Maxie Zeus =

Fictional DC Comics character

- Maxie Zeus as depicted in Who's Who in the DC Universe #14 (November 1991). Art by Jim Aparo.

Publication information
- Publisher: DC Comics
- First appearance: Detective Comics #483 (May 1979)
- Created by: Dennis O'Neil (writer); Don Newton (artist)

In-story information
- Alter ego: Maximilian "Maxie" Zeus
- Species: Human
- Team affiliations: The New Olympians
- Abilities: Criminal mastermind; Skilled strategist and tactician; Electricity expert

Maximilian "Maxie" Zeus is a supervillain appearing in American comic books published by DC Comics, primarily as a minor enemy of Batman. He is depicted as a mentally ill former history professor who is obsessed with Greek mythology and believes himself to be the god Zeus, becoming a crime lord in Gotham City.

== Publication history ==
Maxie Zeus first appeared in Detective Comics #483 (April–May 1979) and was created by Denny O'Neil and Don Newton.

== Fictional character biography ==
Maxie Zeus is a former Greek history teacher who goes insane following the death of his wife and begins thinking that he is Zeus. He becomes a criminal mastermind and battles Batman on several occasions before being committed to Arkham Asylum.

Because Zeus appears to be less dangerous than other notorious Arkham inmates, Arkham's administrators do not commit him in the maximum security wing, despite repeated recommendations from Batman to do so. Batman's concern is vindicated when Zeus escapes Arkham and forms a team of Greek mythology-based superhuman agents called the New Olympians. He attempts to kidnap Olympic athlete Lacinia Nitocris and force her to marry him, but is defeated by Batman and the Outsiders. When the Outsiders best the New Olympians, Batman discovers that Zeus' sole link to sanity is his young daughter Medea—who is usually kept in exclusive boarding schools, safe from her father. Lachina takes in Medea while Zeus surrenders to the police.

In Batman: Knightfall, Zeus is among the villains who escape Arkham after Bane destroys Arkham Asylum. However, he is quickly stopped after colliding with a tree. Some time later, he is drawn into a plot engineered by the Children of Ares to merge Gotham City with Ares' throne capital the Aeropagus, during which he is sacrificed to resurrect Ares.

In Robin, Maxie Zeus appears alive and becomes the head of the illegal casino Maxie's before Robin defeats him. In Batman: Cacophony, Zeus works with the Joker and uses his funds to create a public school. After Batman rescues Zeus from the Joker, he temporarily restores his sanity using antipsychotics and convinces him to turn himself in to the police.

In 2011, The New 52 rebooted the DC Universe. In a story within Batman Eternal, Deacon Blackfire's ghost possesses Maxie Zeus in an attempt to resurrect himself.

== Powers and abilities ==
Maxie Zeus is a skilled strategist and technician.

=== Equipment ===
The Prime Earth version of Maxie Zeus utilizes a lightning rod that can shoot electric blasts.

== In other media ==
=== Television ===
Maxie Zeus as seen in Batman: The Animated Series.

- Maximilian "Maxie" Zeus appears in the Batman: The Animated Series episode "Fire from Olympus", voiced by Steve Susskind. This version is a shipping tycoon who began smuggling goods to support his faltering business. Due to stress and the threat of legal action, he suffers a nervous breakdown, develops a god complex, and believes that he is the Greek god Zeus. As part of his delusions, he begins carrying an electrified thunderbolt-shaped metal rod and sees his girlfriend Clio as the Muse Clio and Batman as his brother Hades.
- Maxie Zeus appears in The Batman, voiced by Phil LaMarr. This version is an eccentric multimillionaire obsessed with Greek mythology, history, and culture who wields electricity-shooting gloves. Additionally, he detests being nicknamed "Maxie".
- Maxie Zeus appears in Harley Quinn, voiced by Will Sasso. This version is a member of the Legion of Doom and a self-help guru for aspiring supervillains who can generate lightning from his hands. He later enters a brief relationship with Nora Fries before they break up.

=== Video games ===
- A recurring standard enemy in the NES version of Batman: The Video Game is identified as Maxie Zeus in the game's instruction manual.
- Maxie Zeus' biography appears in Batman: Arkham Asylum.
- Maxie Zeus appears as a character summon in Scribblenauts Unmasked: A DC Comics Adventure.

=== Miscellaneous ===
- The Batman: The Animated Series incarnation of Maxie Zeus appears in The Batman Adventures #25.
- The Batman incarnation of Maxie Zeus appears in The Batman Strikes! #45.

== See also ==
- List of Batman family enemies
